= First Fork South Fork Piney River =

Physical characteristics
- Source
  - coordinates: 39°43′32″N 106°32′25″W
- Mouth
  - location: Confluence with South Fork Piney River
  - coordinates: 39°45′16″N 106°31′15″W
  - elevation: 8,520 ft (2,600 m)

Basin features
- Progression: South Fork—Piney—Colorado

First Fork South Fork Piney River is a tributary of the South Fork Piney River in Eagle County, Colorado. The river flows northeast from a source in the White River National Forest to a confluence with the South Fork Piney River.

== See also ==
- List of rivers of Colorado
- List of tributaries of the Colorado River
