= Williams Fork =

Williams Fork may refer to a river in the U.S. state of Colorado:

- Williams Fork (Colorado River)
- Williams Fork (Yampa River)
