= North Fork Piney River =

Physical characteristics
- Source
  - coordinates: 39°48′44″N 106°24′37″W
- Mouth
  - location: Confluence with Piney River
  - coordinates: 39°45′57″N 106°29′24″W
  - elevation: 8,061 ft (2,457 m)

Basin features
- Progression: Piney—Colorado

North Fork Piney River is a tributary of the Piney River in Eagle County, Colorado. The river flows southwest from a source on the west flank of Elliott Ridge in the White River National Forest to a confluence with the Piney River.

== See also ==
- List of rivers of Colorado
- List of tributaries of the Colorado River
