= Stoner, Colorado =

Unincorporated community in Montezuma County, CO, USA

Coordinates: 37°35′22″N 108°19′12″W

Stoner is an unincorporated community in Montezuma County, in the U.S. state of Colorado.

== History ==
A post office called Stoner was established in 1917 and remained in operation until 1954. The community takes its name from nearby Stoner Creek.
