= Hidden River (Colorado) =

Physical characteristics
- Source
  - coordinates: 40°21′28″N 105°42′49″W
- Mouth
  - location: Confluence with Spruce Creek
  - coordinates: 40°20′43″N 105°41′40″W
  - elevation: 9,685 ft (2,952 m)

Basin features
- Progression: Spruce—Big Thompson; South Platte—Platte; Missouri—Mississippi

Hidden River is a stream in Larimer County, Colorado. It is a tributary of Spruce Creek, itself a tributary of the Big Thompson River. The stream's source is near the summit of Stones Peak in Rocky Mountain National Park. It flows southeast to a confluence with Spruce Creek in Spruce Canyon.

== See also ==
- List of rivers of Colorado
