= Deception Creek =

Stream in Colorado, U.S.

Coordinates: 40°30′57″N 108°03′40″W

Deception Creek is a stream in the U.S. state of Colorado.

Deception Creek was named for quicksand along its course which frequently killed livestock.

== See also ==
- List of rivers of Colorado
