= East Fork Little Cimarron River =

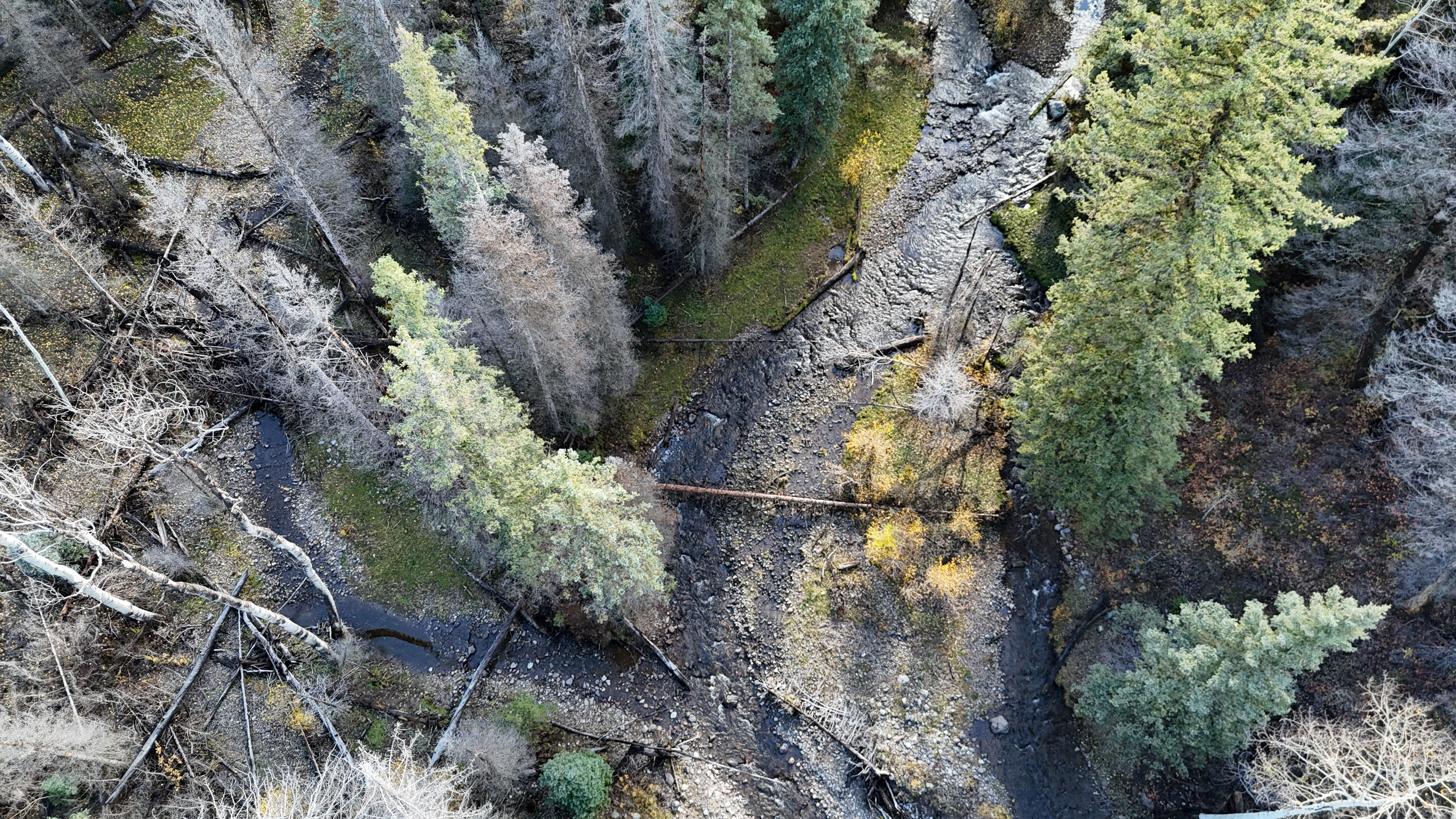
- Aerial view of the confluence where the East Fork of the Little Cimarron River meets Little Cimarron Creek in Uncompahgre National Forest, Colorado. Spruce–fir forest, gravel bars, woody debris and fallen logs under low autumn flow. Drone photo.

Physical characteristics
- Source
  - coordinates: 38°13′27″N 107°25′24″W
- Mouth
  - location: Confluence with Little Cimarron River
  - coordinates: 38°17′54″N 107°27′53″W
  - elevation: 8,497 ft (2,590 m)

Basin features
- Progression: Little Cimarron—Cimarron; Gunnison—Colorado

East Fork Little Cimarron River is a tributary of the Little Cimarron River in Gunnison County, Colorado. The stream flows north from a source in the Uncompahgre National Forest to a confluence with the Little Cimarron River.

== See also ==
- List of rivers of Colorado
- List of tributaries of the Colorado River
