= South Fork Elk River =

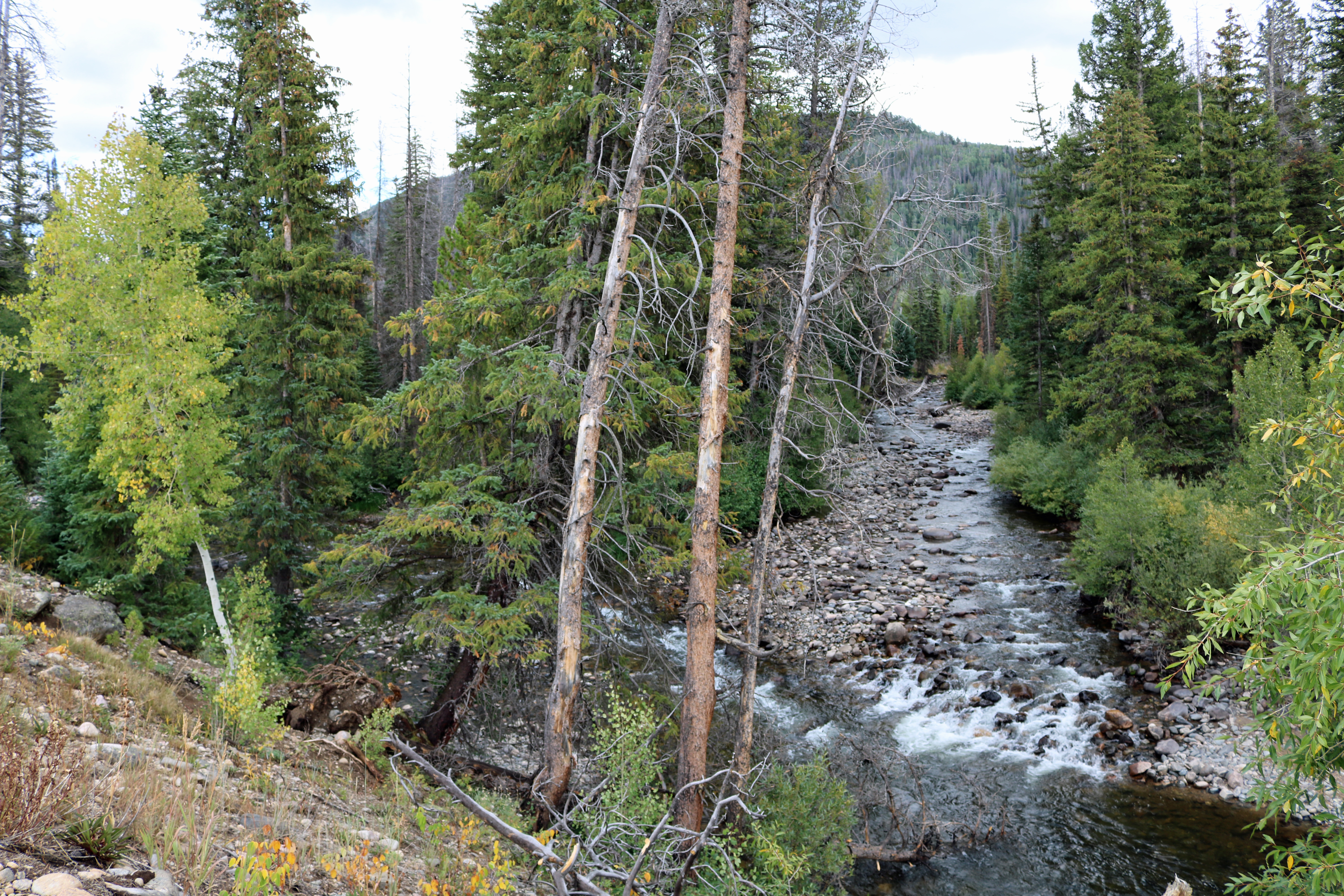
- The mouth of the South Fork Elk River (right), where it empties into the Elk River.

Physical characteristics
- Source
  - coordinates: 40°41′15″N 106°42′46″W
- Mouth
  - location: Confluence with Elk River
  - coordinates: 40°45′20″N 106°48′50″W
  - elevation: 7,680 ft (2,340 m)

Basin features
- Progression: Elk—Yampa—Green—Colorado

The South Fork Elk River is a 13.5-mile-long (21.7 km) stream in Colorado in the United States. It flows from a source near Dome Lake in Routt National Forest north of Steamboat Springs to a confluence with the Elk River.

== See also ==
- List of rivers of Colorado
- List of tributaries of the Colorado River
