= Sand Creek (Colorado Springs, Colorado) =

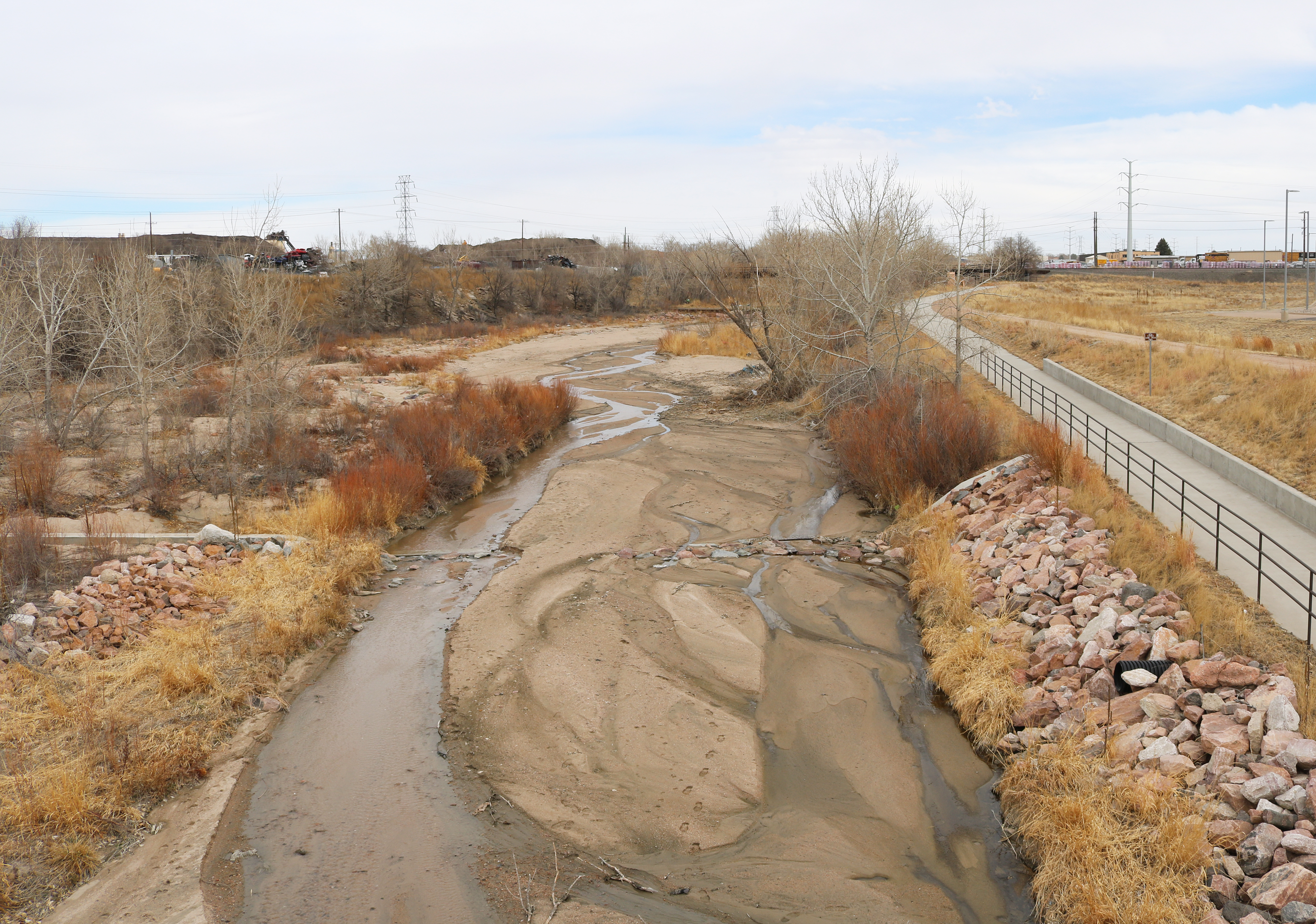
- The creek from a bridge on East Las Vegas Street looking east northeast

Physical characteristics
- Source
  - coordinates: 38°59′58″N 104°39′24″W
- Mouth
  - location: Confluence with Fountain Creek
  - coordinates: 38.78134°N 104.78043°W
  - elevation: 5,784 ft (1,763 m)

Basin features
- Progression: Fountain Creek—Arkansas—Mississippi

Sand Creek is a stream in El Paso County, Colorado, and a tributary of Fountain Creek.

Banning Lewis Number 1 Dam, located approximately one mile south of Shirley, was built across the East Fork of Sand Creek to create Banning Lewis Reservoir Number 1.

Sand Creek is not to be confused with Big Sandy Creek, location of the Sand Creek Massacre.

== See also ==
- List of rivers of Colorado
