= West Branch Laramie River =

Physical characteristics
- Source
  - coordinates: 40°37′44″N 105°56′28″W
- Mouth
  - location: Confluence with Laramie
  - coordinates: 40°40′28″N 105°51′30″W

Basin features
- Progression: Laramie—North Platte—Platte— Missouri—Mississippi

West Branch Laramie River is a 6.0-mile-long (9.7 km) tributary of the Laramie River in Larimer County, Colorado The river's source is Island Lake in the Rawah Wilderness. It flows through Carey Lake then northeast to a confluence with the Laramie River.

== See also ==
- List of rivers of Colorado
