= South Fork Cache la Poudre River =

Physical characteristics
- Source
  - coordinates: 40°29′35″N 105°38′43″W
- Mouth
  - location: Confluence with Cache la Poudre
  - coordinates: 40°41′11″N 105°26′50″W
  - elevation: 6,552 ft (1,997 m)

Basin features
- Progression: Cache la Poudre— South Platte—Platte— Missouri—Mississippi

National Wild and Scenic River
- Designated: October 30, 1986

The South Fork Cache la Poudre River is a 27.0-mile-long (43.5 km) tributary of the Cache la Poudre River in Larimer County, Colorado. The river's source is in the Mummy Range of Rocky Mountain National Park.

== See also ==
- List of rivers of Colorado
