= South Fork Little Snake River =

Physical characteristics
- Source
  - coordinates: 40°49′53″N 107°03′07″W
- Mouth
  - location: Confluence with Little Snake River
  - coordinates: 40°59′30″N 107°03′07″W
  - elevation: 6,995 ft (2,132 m)

Basin features
- Progression: Little Snake—Yampa— Green—Colorado

South Fork Little Snake River is an 18.2-mile-long (29.3 km) tributary of the Little Snake River in Routt County, Colorado. It flows north from a source in Routt National Forest near Steamboat Lake State Park to a confluence with the Little Snake River.

== See also ==
- List of rivers of Colorado
- List of tributaries of the Colorado River
