= Smith Fork (Colorado) =

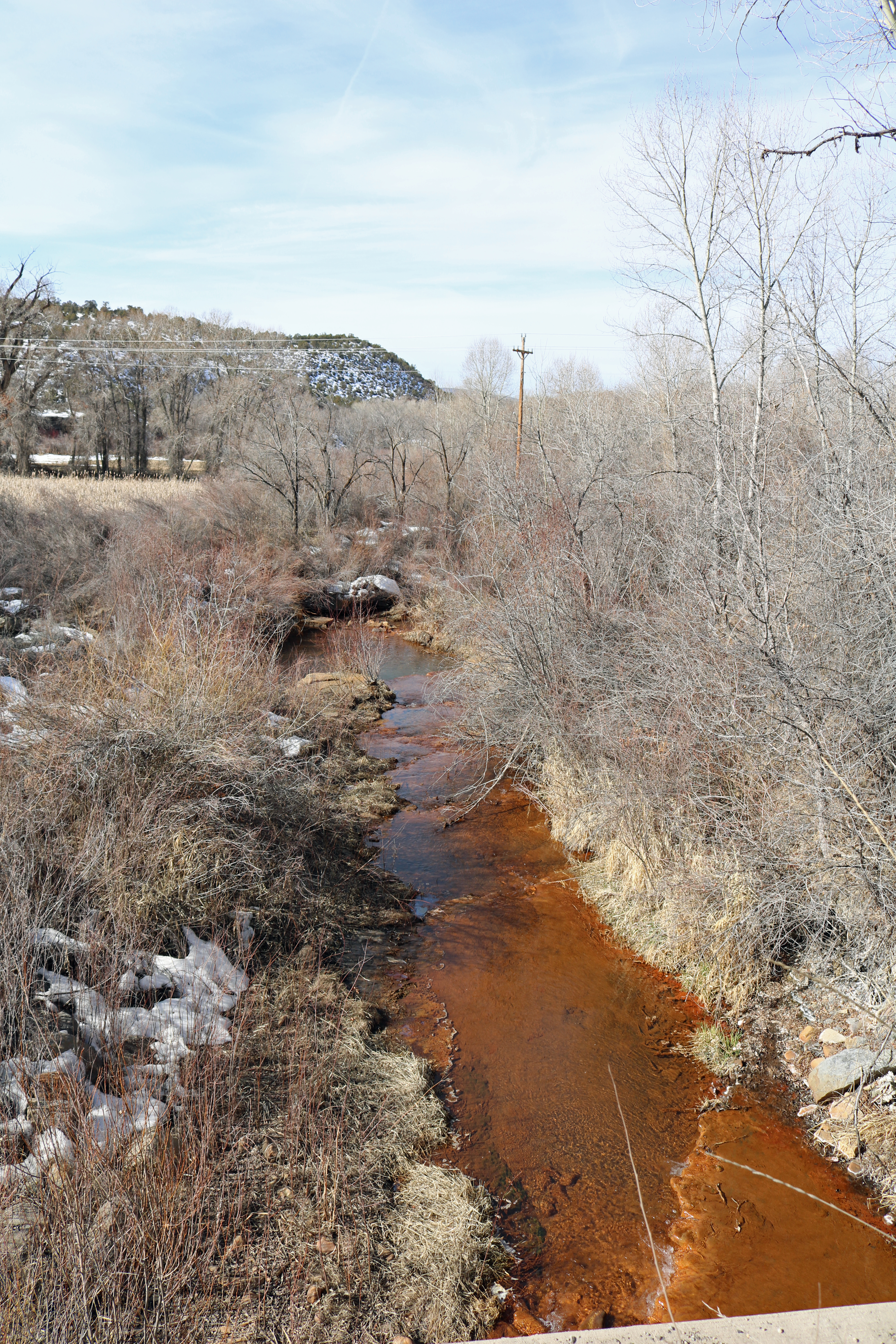
- The river as seen from a bridge on Colorado State Highway 92 at Crawford.

Physical characteristics
- Source
  - location: Confluence of the North Smith Fork Gunnison River and South Smith Fork
  - coordinates: 38°43′31″N 107°28′23″W
- Mouth
  - location: Confluence with the Gunnison River
  - coordinates: 38°44′14″N 107°50′18″W
  - elevation: 5,148 ft (1,569 m).

Basin features
- Progression: Gunnison-Colorado

Smith Fork is a tributary of the Gunnison River that flows in Gunnison and Delta counties in western Colorado. The river is signed as "Smith Fork Creek" where it goes under Colorado State Highway 92 in Crawford, Colorado.

The river begins at the confluence of the North Smith Fork Gunnison River and South Smith Fork in the West Elk Mountains. Smith Fork joins the Gunnison River in the Gunnison Gorge National Conservation Area.

East of Crawford, a small dam, called the Smith Fork Diversion Dam, diverts water from Smith Fork and carries it to Crawford Reservoir via the Smith Fork Feeder Canal. The canal was built as part of the Smith Fork Project, one of the component projects of the Colorado River Storage Project.

The river flows through a mountainous and hilly terrain, with the landmark Needle Rock nearby.

== See also ==
- List of rivers of Colorado
- List of tributaries of the Colorado River
