= North Fork Little Thompson River =

Physical characteristics
- Source
  - coordinates: 40°22′02″N 105°25′03″W
- Mouth
  - location: Confluence with Little Thompson
  - coordinates: 40°18′08″N 105°18′06″W
  - elevation: 5,761 ft (1,756 m)

Basin features
- Progression: Little Thompson; Big Thompson; South Platte—Platte; Missouri—Mississippi

North Fork Little Thompson River is a tributary of the Little Thompson River in Larimer County, Colorado. It flows southeast from a source in Roosevelt National Forest to a confluence with the Little Thompson.

== See also ==
- List of rivers of Colorado
