= Threemile Creek (Roaring Fork River tributary) =

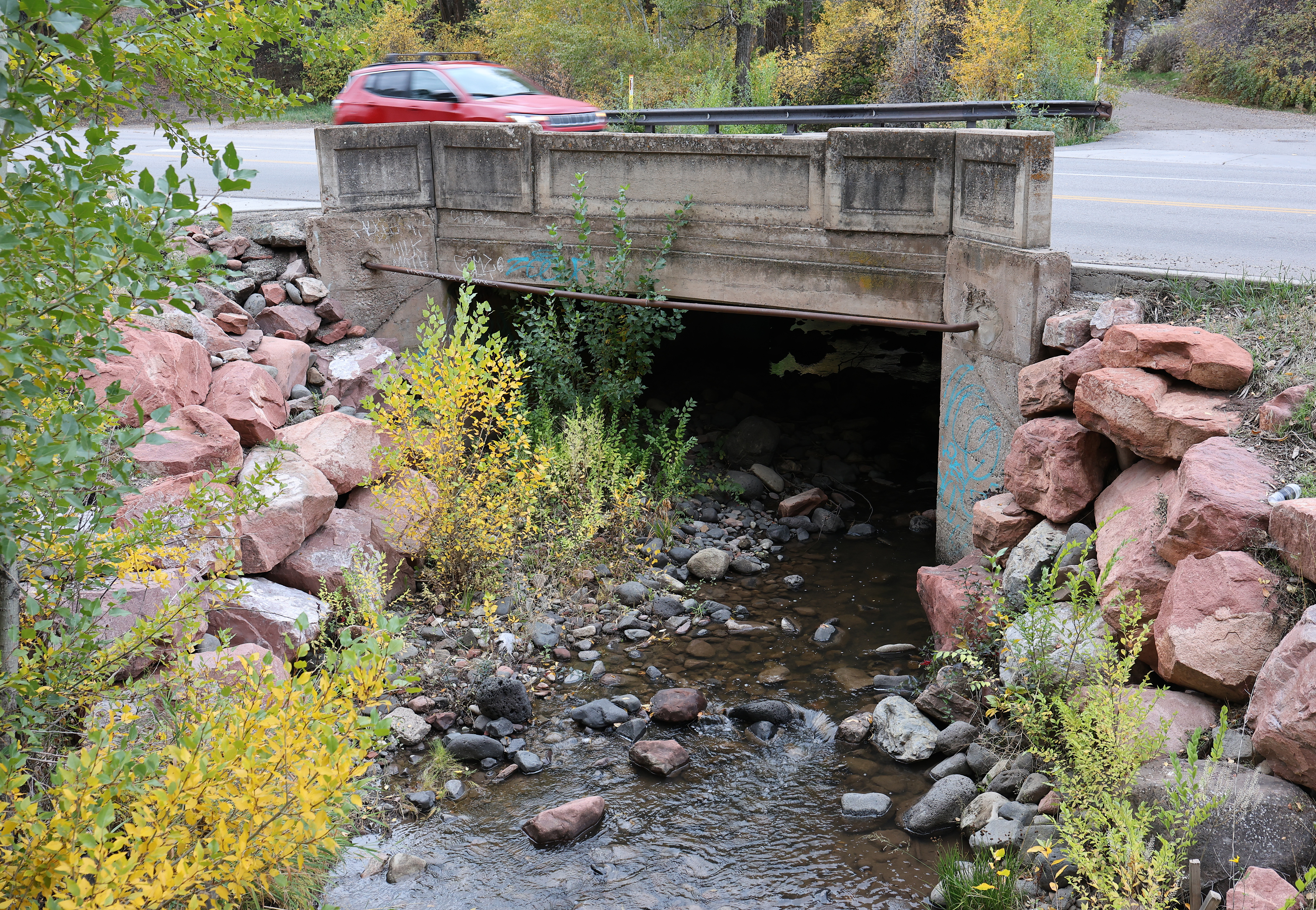
- The creek where it goes under Midland Avenue in Glenwood Springs

- Location of the creek's mouth in Colorado

Physical characteristics
- Source
  - location: Garfield County, Colorado
  - coordinates: 39°26′7.94″N 107°21′54.19″W
- Mouth
  - location: Glenwood Springs, Colorado
  - coordinates: 39°30′53.94″N 107°19′4.19″W
  - elevation: 5,801 feet (1,768 meters)

Basin features
- Progression: Roaring Fork → Colorado

Threemile Creek is a tributary of the Roaring Fork River in Garfield County, Colorado.

== Course ==
The creek rises on the north side of Sunlight Peak in the White River National Forest. From there, it travels generally north until it is impounded by Hughes Reservoir. Leaving the reservoir, the creek flows north, then turns northeast. From there, Three Mile Road follows the stream to Midland Avenue, where it passes under the avenue and, from there, flows north to its confluence with the Roaring Fork River.

== See also ==
- List of rivers of Colorado
