= South Fork Animas River =

Physical characteristics
- Source
  - coordinates: 37°51′34″N 107°37′18″W
- Mouth
  - location: Confluence with Animas River
  - coordinates: 37°52′43″N 107°33′58″W
  - elevation: 9,849 ft (3,002 m)

Basin features
- Progression: Animas—San Juan—Colorado

South Fork Animas River is a tributary of the Animas River in San Juan County, Colorado. It flows from a source near Tower Mountain to a confluence with the Animas River.

== See also ==
- List of rivers of Colorado
