= Wolf Creek (Mineral County, Colorado) =

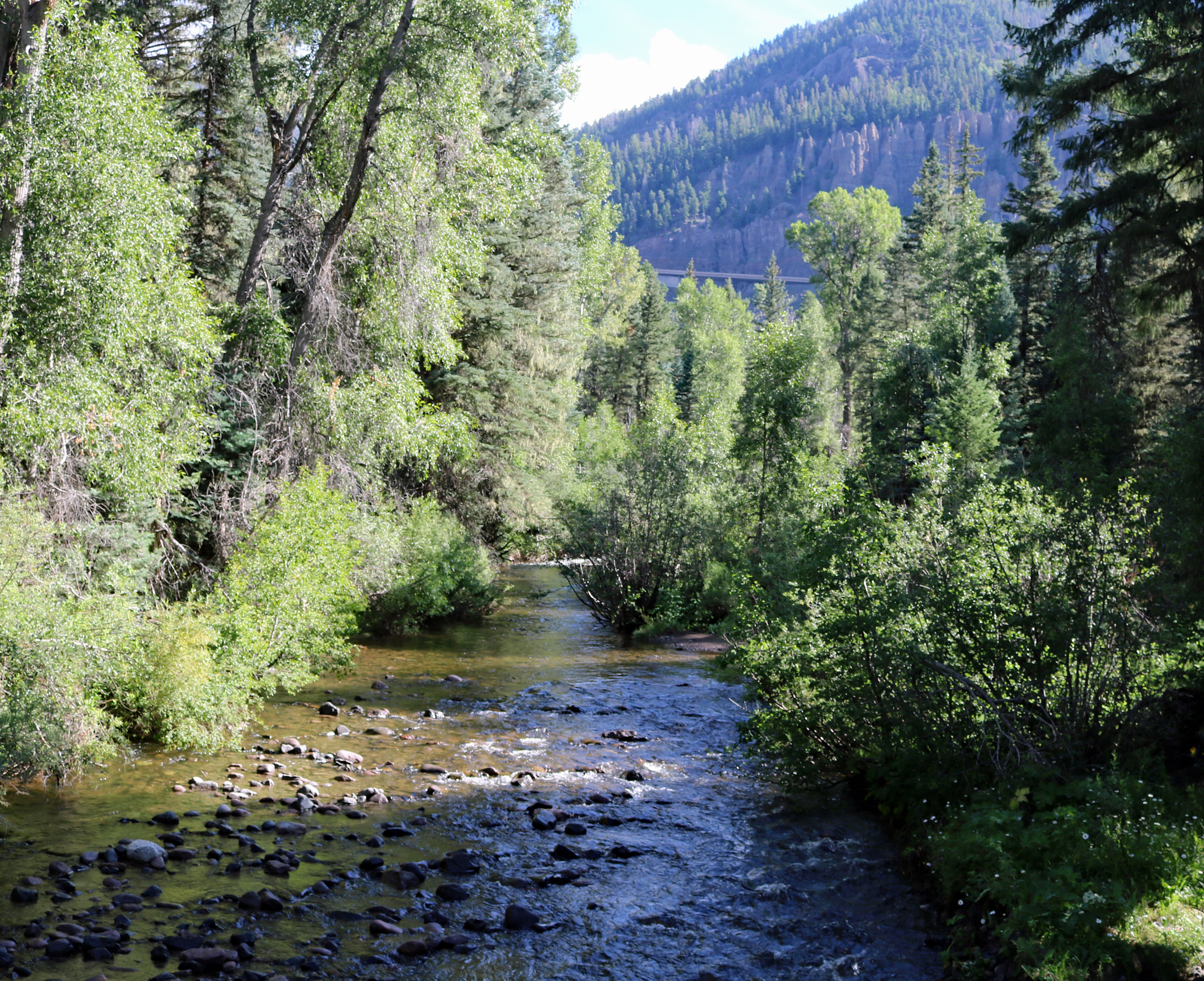
- The creek at Forest Road 648 (West Fork Road) on the west side of Wolf Creek Pass looking back towards the pass.

Location
- Country: United States
- State: Colorado
- County: Mineral County

Physical characteristics
- Source
  - location: Wolf Creek Pass
  - coordinates: 37°28′20″N 106°48′33″W
- Mouth: West Fork San Juan River
  - location: Mineral County, Colorado
  - coordinates: 37°25′50″N 106°53′36″W
  - elevation: 7,785 ft (2,373 m)
- Length: 8.3 miles (13.4 km)

Basin features
- Progression: West Fork San Juan—San Juan—Colorado

Wolf Creek is a stream in Mineral County, Colorado. It is the creek for which Wolf Creek Pass is named.

== Sources ==
The creek rises just west of the Wolf Creek ski area at the Continental Divide near the top of Wolf Creek Pass. From there it flows west, paralleling U.S. Highway 160 for several miles until it passes under the highway on its way to its confluence with the West Fork of the San Juan River near the bottom of the pass.

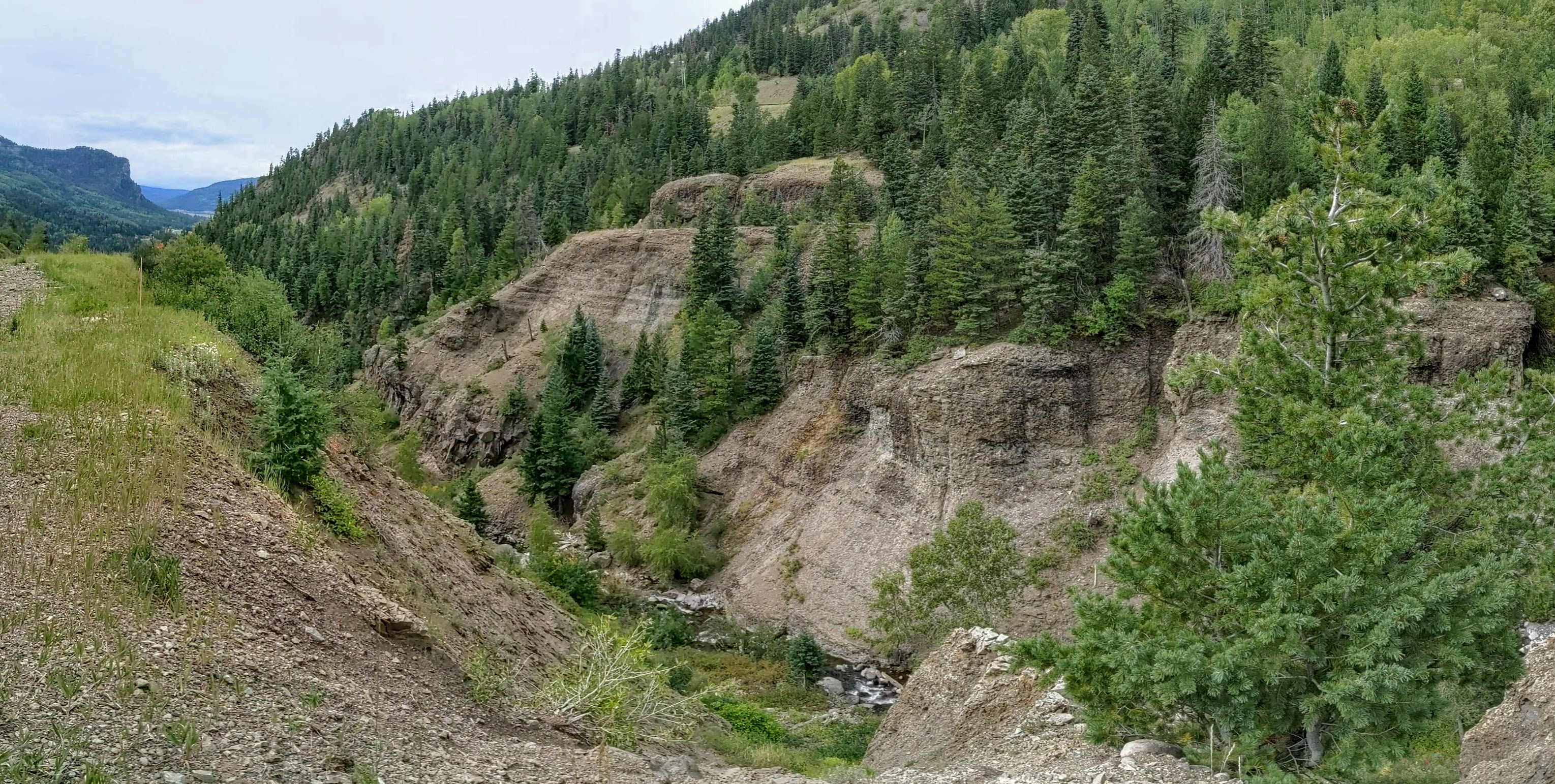
View from a US 160 overlook part way up the west side of Wolf Creek Pass, near the source

== See also ==
- List of rivers of Colorado
- List of tributaries of the Colorado River
