= North Fork Fryingpan River =

Physical characteristics
- Source
  - coordinates: 39°21′29″N 106°30′53″W
- Mouth
  - location: Confluence with Fryingpan River
  - coordinates: 39°20′38″N 106°40′20″W
  - elevation: 8,232 ft (2,509 m)

Basin features
- Progression: Fryinpan—Roaring Fork—Colorado

North Fork Fryingpan River is a tributary of the Fryingpan River in Pitkin and Eagle counties in the US state of Colorado. The stream flows west from a source in the White River National Forest through Savage Lakes to a confluence with the Fryingpan River.

== See also ==
- List of rivers of Colorado
