= Badger Creek (Arkansas River tributary) =

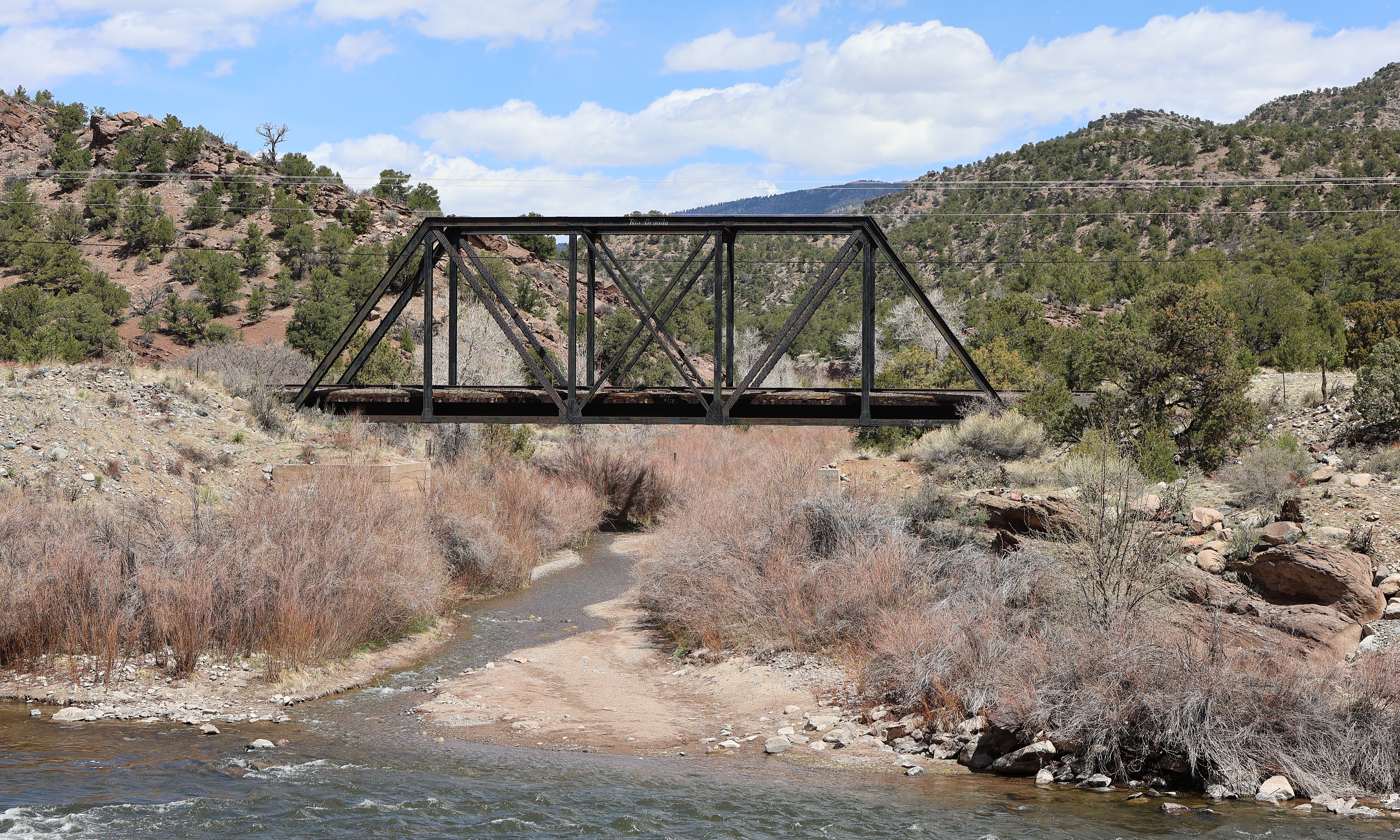
- The creek's mouth at the Arkansas River

- Location of the creek's mouth in Colorado

Physical characteristics
- Source
  - location: Park County, Colorado
  - coordinates: 38°48′23.98″N 105°53′59.03″W
- Mouth
  - location: near Howard, Colorado
  - coordinates: 38°27′55.99″N 105°51′41.03″W
  - elevation: 6,739 feet (2,054 meters)

Basin features
- Progression: Arkansas→ Mississippi

Badger Creek is a tributary of the Arkansas River in Park and Fremont counties in south central Colorado.

== Course ==
The creek rises in southwest Park County in the San Isabel National Forest. From there, it flows generally south until it reaches its confluence with the Arkansas River west of Howard, Colorado. The creek's watershed occupies about 100 square miles (260 square kilometers). The land the creek flows over is owned by both federal and state agencies and by private landowners.

== Badger Creek Watershed Partnership ==
The Badger Creek watershed suffers from numerous problems related to human use, such as overgrazing, compacted soil, erosion, and the formation of gullies, and by natural hazards such as flash floods generated by thunderstorms. These problems lead to much sediment being washed downstream. Formed in 2016, the Badger Creek Watershed Partnership is a group of public and private agencies and private landowners that aims to analyze, improve, restore, and protect the creek's watershed to hold back sediment and send clear water downstream. The Central Colorado Conservancy has managed the partnership since 2017.

== See also ==
- List of rivers of Colorado
