= South Fork Fryingpan River =

Physical characteristics
- Source
  - coordinates: 39°09′44″N 106°33′41″W
- Mouth
  - location: Confluence with Fryingpan River
  - coordinates: 39°18′21″N 106°37′20″W
  - elevation: 8,625 ft (2,629 m)

Basin features
- Progression: Fryinpan—Roaring Fork—Colorado

South Fork Fryingpan River is a tributary of the Fryingpan River in Pitkin County, Colorado. It flows north from a source in the Hunter-Fryingpan Wilderness to a confluence with the Fryingpan River in the White River National Forest.

== See also ==
- List of rivers of Colorado
