= North Fork Animas River =

Physical characteristics
- Source
  - coordinates: 37°57′27″N 107°34′32″W
- Mouth
  - location: Confluence with West Fork
  - coordinates: 37°55′53″N 107°34′10″W
  - elevation: 11,109 ft (3,386 m)

Basin features
- Progression: Animas—San Juan—Colorado

North Fork Animas River is a tributary of the Animas River in San Juan County, Colorado. It flows south to a confluence with the West Fork Animas River that forms the Animas River.

== See also ==
- List of rivers of Colorado
