= Pawnee Creek (Colorado) =

Physical characteristics
- Source
  - location: Confluence of North Pawnee and South Pawnee
  - coordinates: 40°41′17″N 103°40′24″W
- Mouth
  - location: Confluence with the South Platte
  - coordinates: 40°33′51″N 103°14′09″W
  - elevation: 3,963 ft (1,208 m)
- Basin size: 724 sq mi (1,880 km^{2})

Basin features
- Progression: South Platte—Platte— Missouri—Mississippi

Pawnee Creek is a 46.5-mile-long (74.8 km) tributary that joins the South Platte River in Logan County, Colorado south of Sterling. The creek's source is in Weld County at the confluence of North Pawnee Creek and South Pawnee Creek in Pawnee National Grassland.

The creek is named after the Pawnee Tribe.

== See also ==
- List of rivers of Colorado
