= West Fork Animas River =

River in the United States of America

Physical characteristics
- Source
  - coordinates: 37°54′52″N 107°36′56″W
- Mouth
  - location: Confluence with North Fork
  - coordinates: 37°55′53″N 107°34′10″W
  - elevation: 11,109 ft (3,386 m)

Basin features
- Progression: Animas—San Juan—Colorado

West Fork Animas River is a tributary of the Animas River in San Juan County, Colorado. It flows from a source near Hurricane Peak to a confluence with the North Fork Animas River that forms the Animas River.

== See also ==
- List of rivers of Colorado
