= Woody Creek (Colorado) =

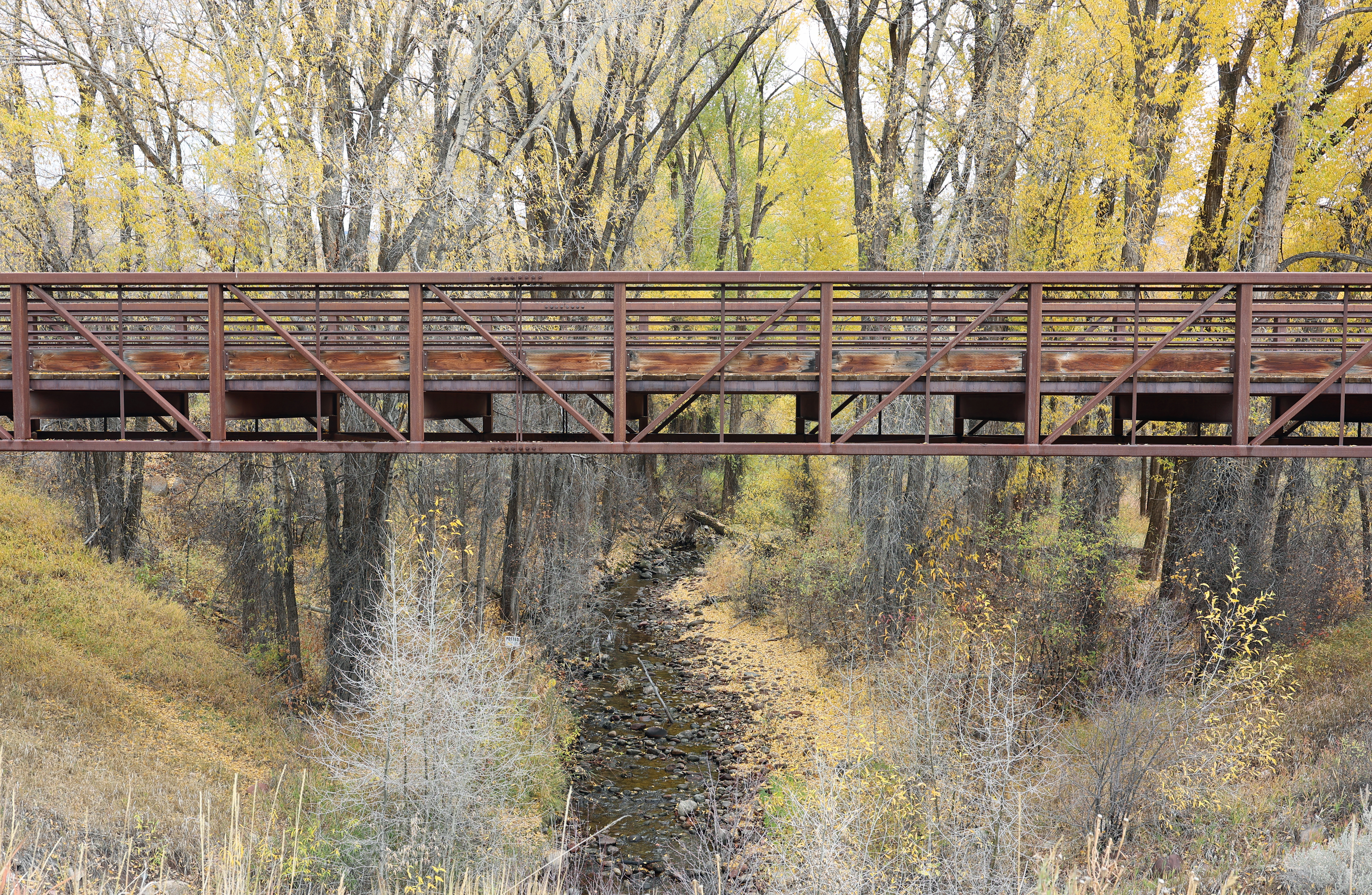
- The creek passing under a bridge carrying the Rio Grande Trail

- The location of the creek's mouth in Colorado

Physical characteristics
- Source
  - location: Hunter–Fryingpan Wilderness in the White River National Forest
  - coordinates: 39°13′32.95″N 106°39′42.12″W
- Mouth
  - location: Woody Creek, Colorado
  - coordinates: 39°16′36.95″N 106°53′29.15″W
  - elevation: 6,841 feet (2,085 meters)
- Length: 15 miles (24 kilometers).

Basin features
- Progression: Roaring Fork → Colorado
- Tributaries
  - right: Spruce Creek; Cliff Creek; Silver Creek; Wilbur Creek; Sawmill Creek; Casaday Creek; Collins Creek; Little Woody Creek

Woody Creek is a tributary of the Roaring Fork River in Pitkin County, Colorado. The community of Woody Creek, Colorado takes its name from the creek.

== Course ==
The creek rises northeast of Aspen in the Hunter Fryingpan Wilderness in the White River National Forest. From there, it travels generally northwest, losing some of its flow to ditch diversions, eventually passing under the Rio Grande Trail and Upper River Road to its confluence with the Roaring Fork River in Woody Creek.

== See also ==
- List of rivers of Colorado
