= Roan Creek (Colorado) =

- The creek in De Beque, Colorado (2026)

Physical characteristics
- Source
  - coordinates: 39°36′55″N 108°39′35″W
- Mouth
  - location: Confluence with Colorado River
  - coordinates: 39°19′41″N 108°12′59″W
  - elevation: 4,905 ft (1,495 m)

Basin features
- Progression: Colorado

Roan Creek is a 45.7-mile-long (73.5 km) tributary of the Colorado River in Garfield and Mesa counties in Colorado, U.S.

== See also ==
- List of rivers of Colorado
- List of tributaries of the Colorado River
