= Fall River (Clear Creek County, Colorado) =

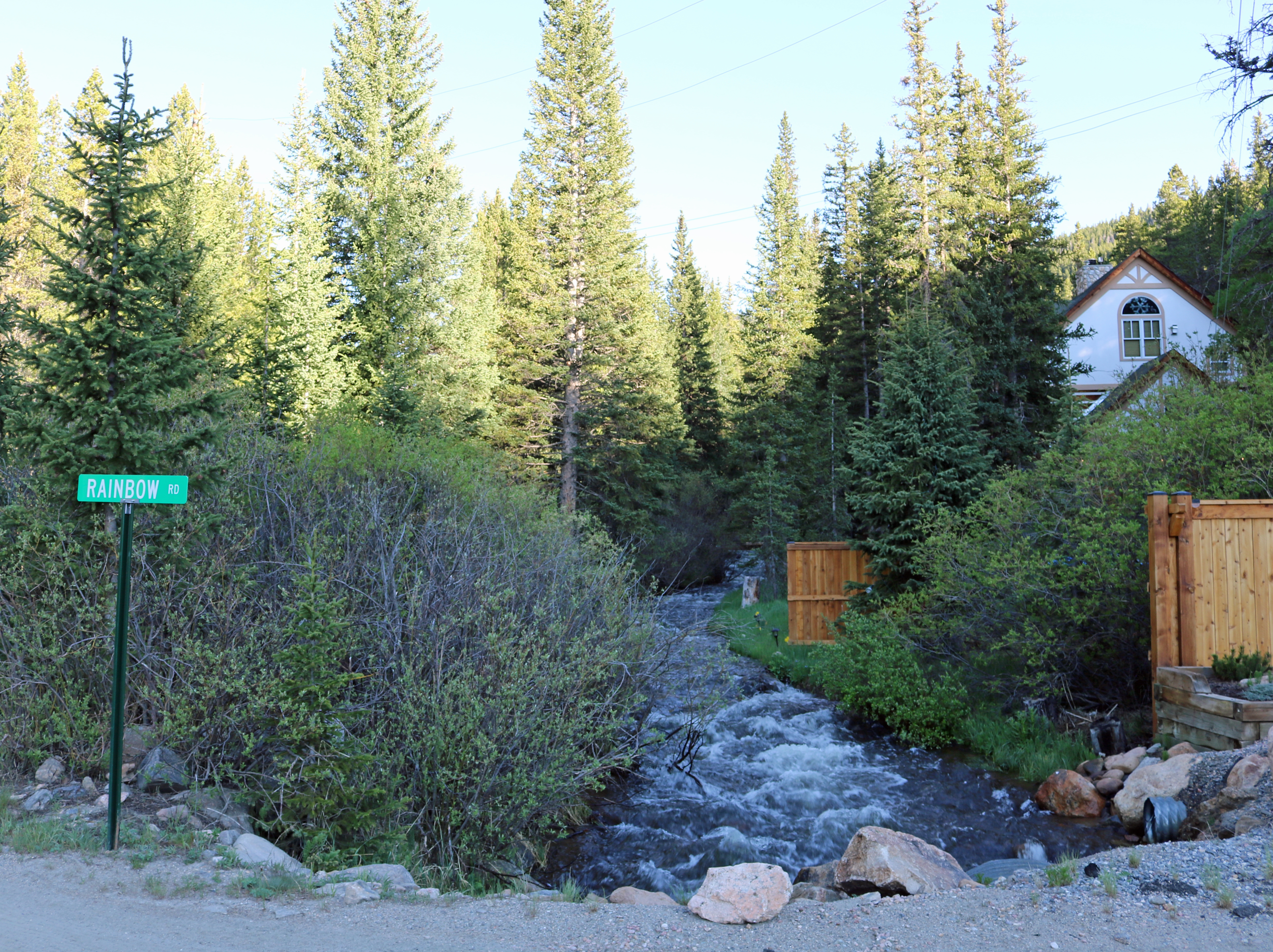
- The river at the intersection of Fall River and Rainbow roads

Physical characteristics
- Source
  - coordinates: 39°49′51″N 105°42′49″W
- Mouth
  - location: Confluence with Clear Creek
  - coordinates: 39°45′18″N 105°33′23″W
  - elevation: 7,726 ft (2,355 m)

Basin features
- Progression: Clear Creek—South Platte— Platte—Missouri—Mississippi

Fall River is an 11.0-mile-long (17.7 km) tributary of Clear Creek in Clear Creek County, Colorado. It flows from a source just south of Parry Peak to a confluence with Clear Creek west of Idaho Springs.

== See also ==
- List of rivers of Colorado
