= South Fork San Miguel River =

Physical characteristics
- Source
  - location: Confluence of Lake Fork and Howard Fork
  - coordinates: 37°51′59″N 107°53′02″W
- Mouth
  - location: Confluence with San Miguel River
  - coordinates: 37°56′31″N 107°54′02″W
  - elevation: 8,045 ft (2,452 m)

Basin features
- Progression: San Miguel—Dolores—Colorado

South Fork San Miguel River is a 6.5-mile-long (10.5 km) tributary of the San Miguel River in San Miguel County, Colorado. The river flows north from a confluence of the Lake Fork and the Howard Fork to a confluence with the San Miguel River west of Telluride.

== See also ==
- List of rivers of Colorado
- List of tributaries of the Colorado River
