= Big Dry Creek (Littleton, Colorado) =

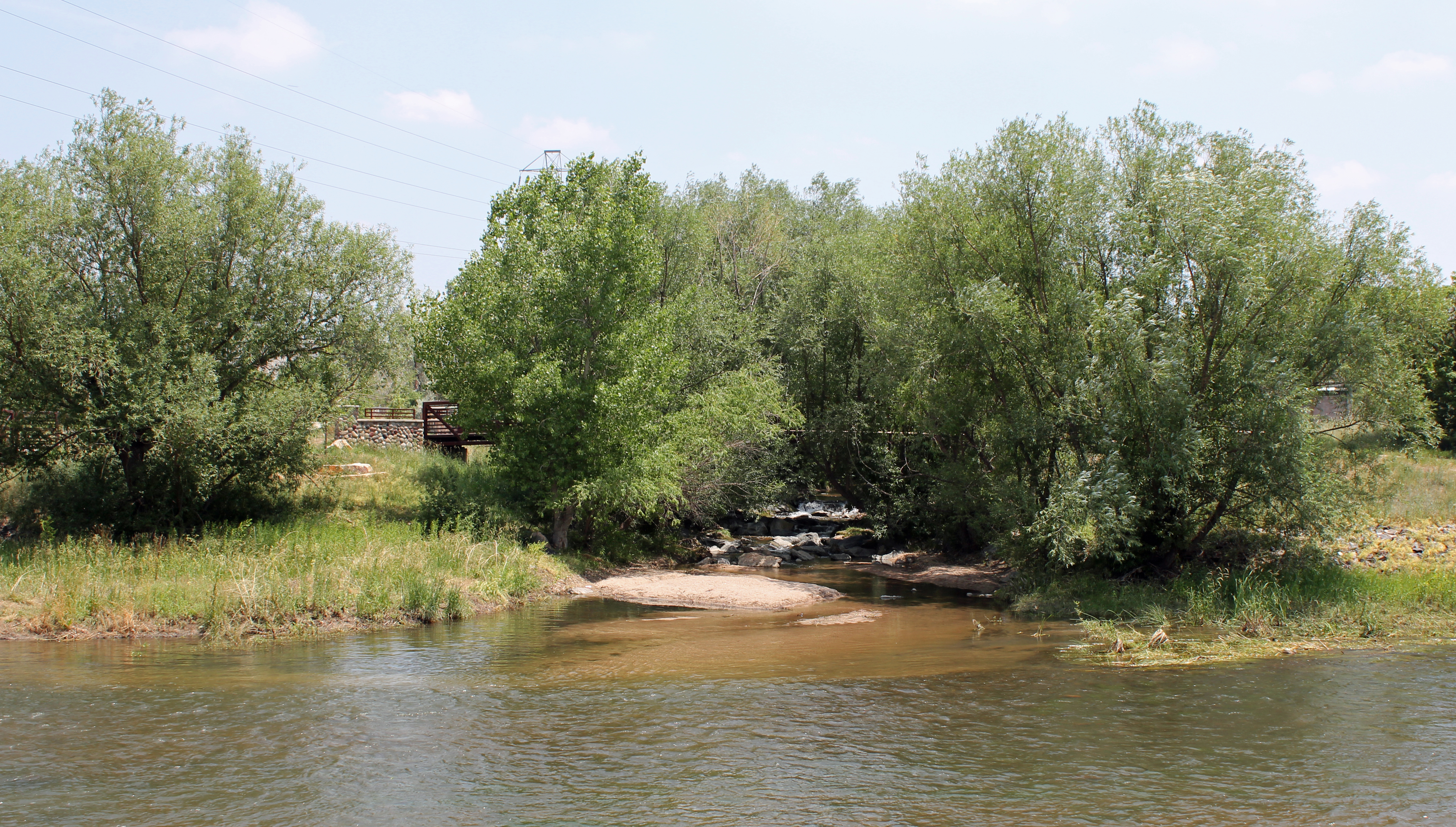
- The confluence of Big Dry Creek and the South Platte River in Englewood, Colorado.

Physical characteristics
- Source
  - coordinates: 39°29′09″N 104°55′33″W
- Mouth
  - location: Confluence with the South Platte
  - coordinates: 39°37′50″N 105°00′52″W
  - elevation: 5,298 ft (1,615 m)

Basin features
- Progression: South Platte—Platte— Missouri—Mississippi

Big Dry Creek is a 16.9-mile-long (27.2 km) tributary that joins the South Platte River in Englewood, Colorado. The creek's source is in Daniels Park in Douglas County.

== See also ==
- List of rivers of Colorado
- Big Dry Creek (Westminster, Colorado)
