= North Fork Swan River =

Physical characteristics
- Source
  - coordinates: 39°32′59″N 105°53′31″W
- Mouth
  - location: Confluence with Swan River
  - coordinates: 39°30′47″N 105°56′49″W
  - elevation: 9,790 ft (2,980 m)

Basin features
- Progression: Swan—Blue—Colorado

North Fork Swan River is a tributary of the Swan River in Summit County, Colorado. The stream flows southwest from a source on Glacier Peak in the Arapaho National Forest to a confluence with the Swan River.

== See also ==
- List of rivers of Colorado
