= Rush Creek (Colorado) =

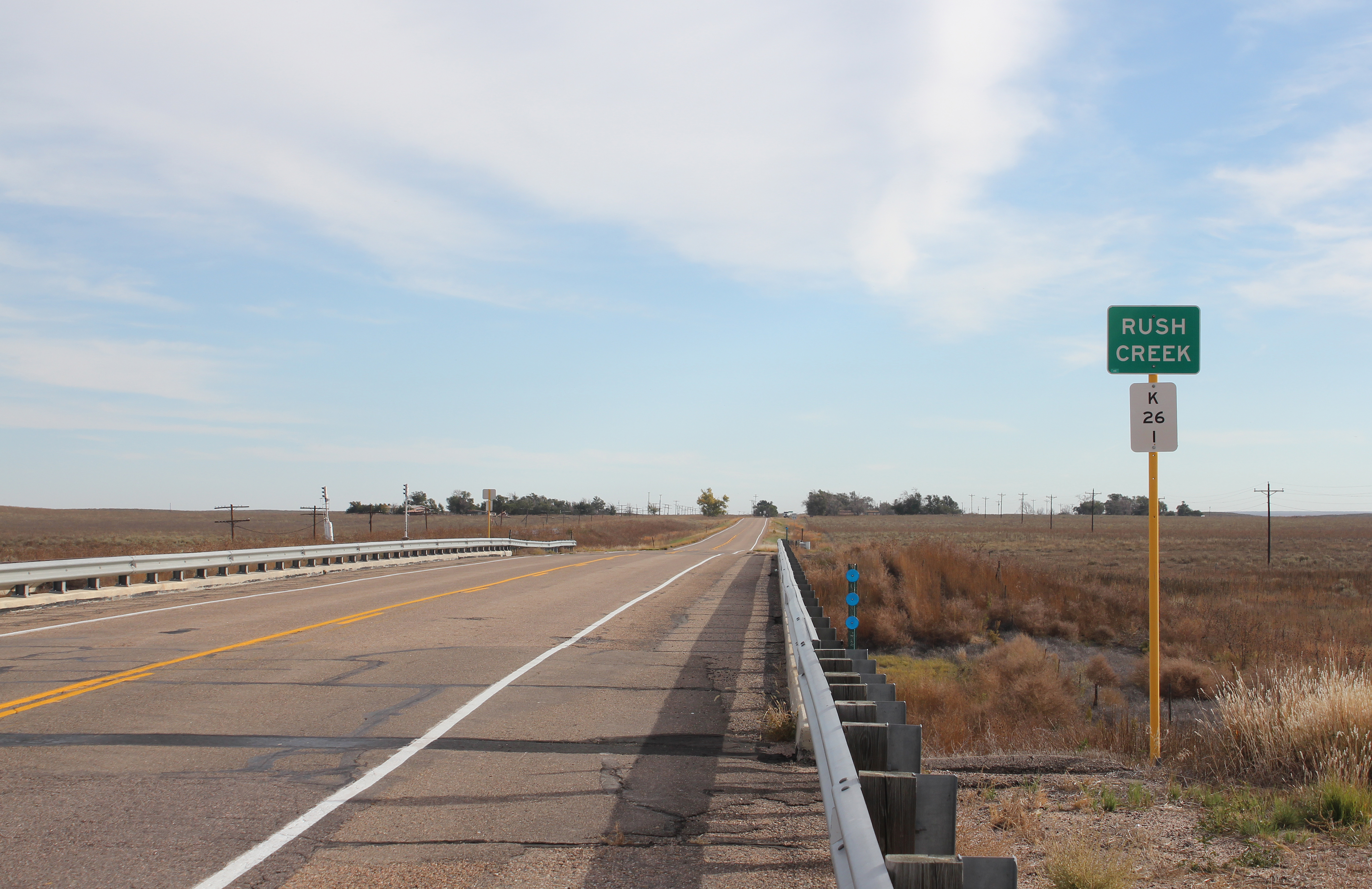

Physical characteristics
- Source
  - location: Confluence of North Rush Creek and South Rush Creek
  - coordinates: 38°48′06″N 103°27′02″W
- Mouth
  - location: Confluence with Big Sandy Creek
  - coordinates: 38°22′02″N 102°31′39″W
  - elevation: 3,796 ft (1,157 m)
- Length: 102 mi (164 km)
- Basin size: 1,378 sq mi (3,570 km^{2})

Basin features
- Progression: Big Sandy Creek— Arkansas—Mississippi

Rush Creek is a 102-mile-long (164 km) tributary of Big Sandy Creek in Colorado. It starts at the confluence of South Rush Creek and North Rush Creek in Lincoln County. The creek flows through Cheyenne County before joining Big Sandy Creek in Kiowa County.

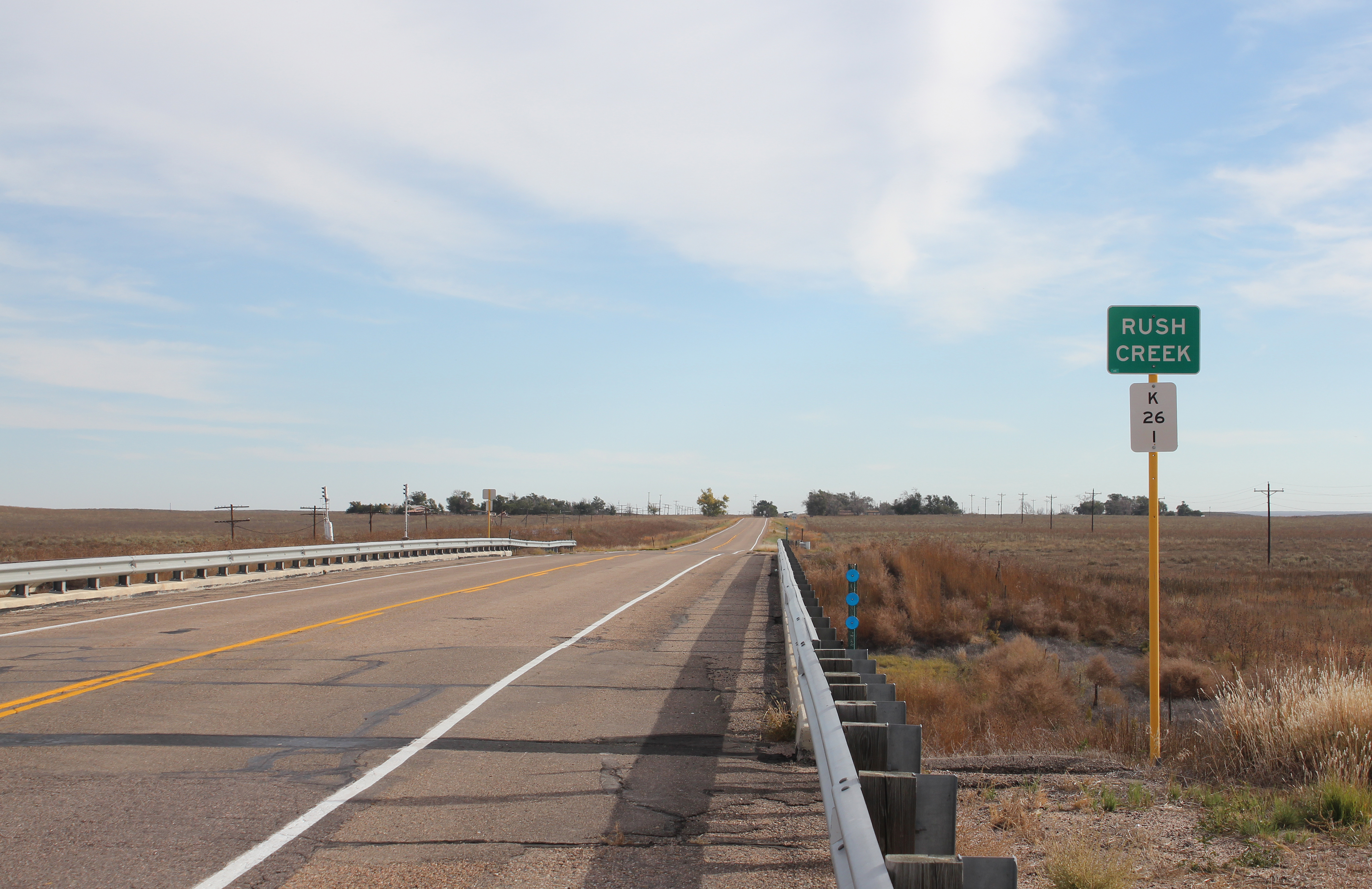
The Colorado State Highway 96 in Kiowa County crosses the Rush Creek.

== See also ==
- List of rivers of Colorado
