= Kettle Creek (Colorado) =

Stream in El Paso County, Colorado, U.S.

Coordinates: 38°58′22.5″N 104°48′10.5″W

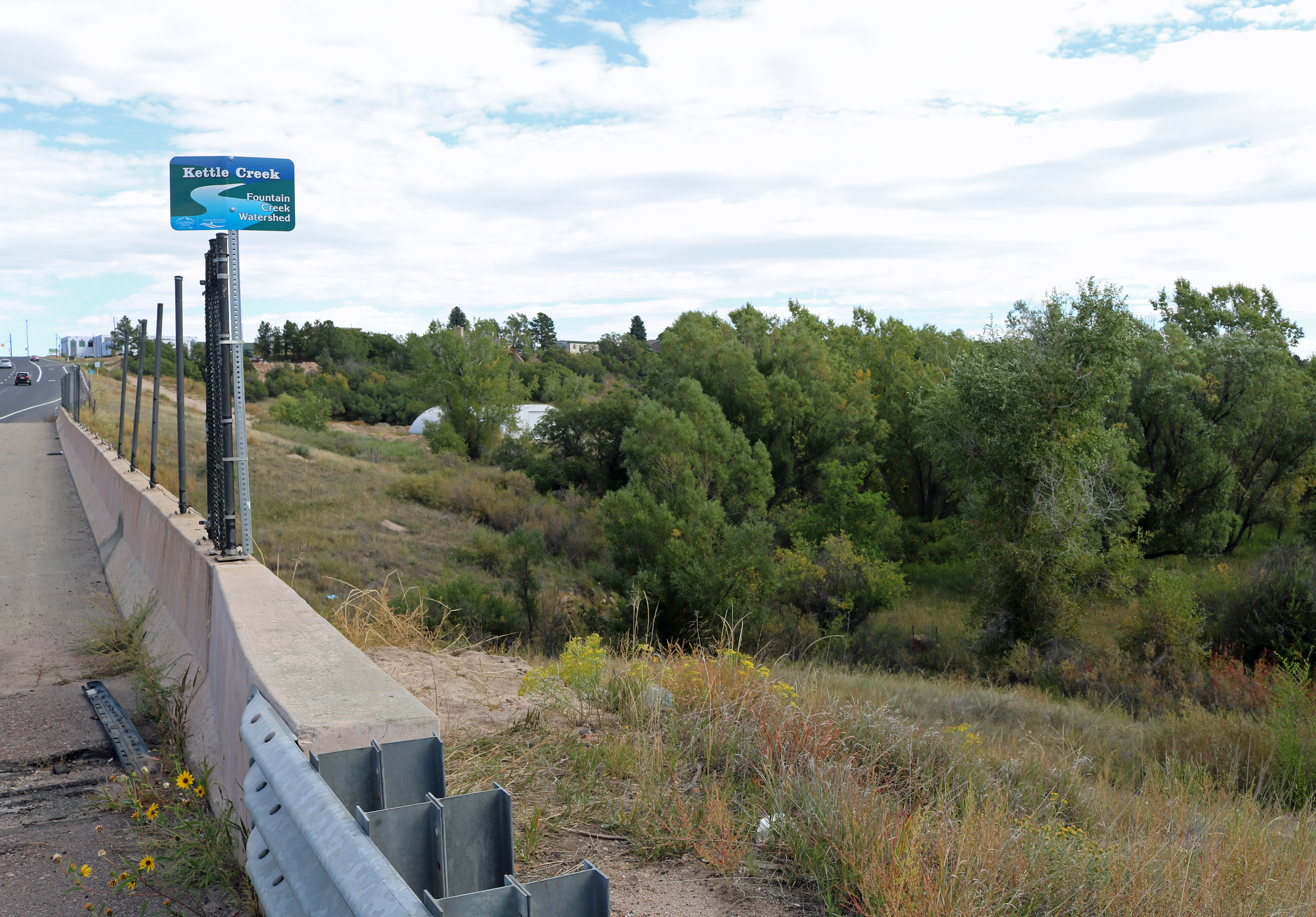
Part of the Kettle Creek watershed as viewed from a bridge on Voyager Parkway

Kettle Creek is a stream in El Paso County, Colorado, in the United States.

Kettle Creek was named after an incident in which a kettle was lost near its banks.

== See also ==
- List of rivers of Colorado
