= King Arroyo =

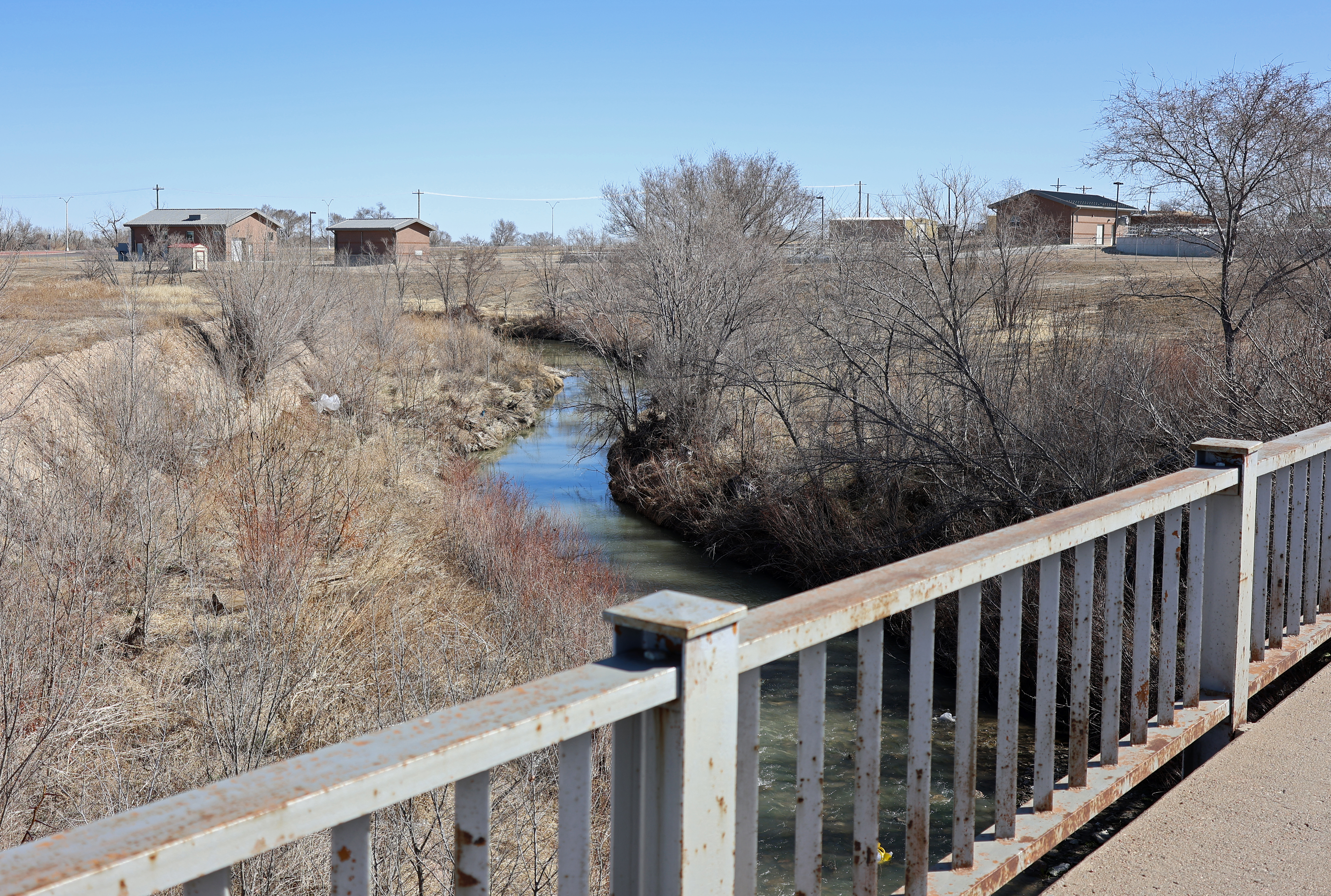
- The arroyo viewed from the East 3rd Street bridge in La Junta

- Location of the mouth of King Arroyo in Colorado

Physical characteristics
- Source
  - location: Comanche National Grassland
  - coordinates: 37°51′15.04″N 103°29′46.79″W
- Mouth
  - location: Confluence with the Arkansas
  - coordinates: 37°59′23.03″N 103°31′49.79″W
  - elevation: 4,049 ft (1,234 m)

Basin features
- Progression: Arkansas—Mississippi
- Tributaries
  - right: East Fork King Arroyo

King Arroyo is a tributary of the Arkansas River in Otero County, Colorado.

== Course ==
King Arroyo rises in the Comanche National Grassland south of La Junta, Colorado and flows generally north. Its main tributary is East Fork King Arroyo. The two streams join southeast of La Junta. King Arroyo then continues north along the east side of La Junta before passing under Highway 50 and emptying into the Arkansas.

== Name ==
The stream was likely named for Colonel John Quincy Adams King who operated a ferry over a ford on the Arkansas River just east of La Junta's city limits, which matches the location of King Arroyo. King's Ferry, as it was called, ran until 1875 when it was made obsolete by the arrival of the railroad.

== See also ==
- List of rivers of Colorado
