= List of rivers of Colorado =

The location of the State of Colorado in the United States of America.

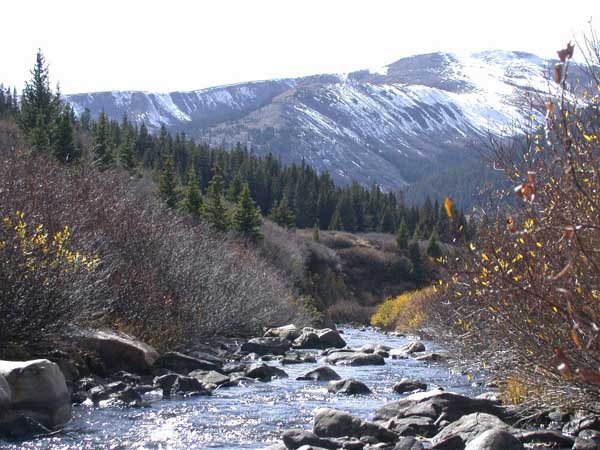
The headwaters of the Arkansas River near Leadville.

This is a list of rivers and streams in the U.S. State of Colorado.

1. Alphabetical list
2. Tributary chart

== Alphabetical list ==
The following alphabetical list includes many important streams that flow through the State of Colorado, including all 158 named rivers. Where available, the total extent of the stream's drainage basin is shown after the name. The names of the 17 Colorado rivers with a drainage basin of more than 10,000 square kilometers (3,900 sq mi), about three times the area of Rhode Island, are shown in bold.

1. Adams Fork Conejos River
2. Adobe Creek
3. Alamosa River 383 km^{2} (148 mi^{2})
4. Animas River 3,562 km^{2} (1,375 mi^{2})
5. Apishapa River 2,798 km^{2} (1,080 mi^{2})
6. Arikaree River 4,429 km^{2} (1,710 mi^{2})
7. **Arkansas River** 478,501 km^{2} (184,750 mi^{2})
8. Aspen Brook
9. Badger Creek
10. Bear Creek 4,500 km^{2} (1,737 mi^{2})
11. Bear Creek 339 km^{2} (131 mi^{2})
12. Bear River
13. Beaver Creek 2,939 km^{2} (1,135 mi^{2})
14. Beaver Creek (Arkansas River tributary)
15. Big Dry Creek (Littleton, Colorado)
16. Big Dry Creek (Westminster, Colorado)
17. Big Sandy Creek 4,825 km^{2} (1,863 mi^{2})
18. Big Thompson River 2,149 km^{2} (830 mi^{2})
19. Bijou Creek 3,612 km^{2} (1,395 mi^{2})
20. Blue Creek
21. Blue River 1,770 km^{2} (683 mi^{2})
22. Box Elder Creek
23. Boulder Creek (1,160 km^{2} (448 mi^{2})
24. Cache la Poudre River 4,959 km^{2} (1,915 mi^{2})
25. **Canadian River** 122,701 km^{2} (47,375 mi^{2})
26. Canadian River
27. Carnero Creek
28. Castle Creek
29. Cattle Creek
30. Cebolla Creek
31. Chalk Creek
32. Cherry Creek 1,050 km^{2} (405 mi^{2})
33. Chico Creek 1,934 km^{2} (747 mi^{2})
34. **Cimarron River** (Note: The headwaters of the Cimarron River are located in Union County, New Mexico, a short distance south of the Colorado border.) 44,890 km^{2} (17,332 mi^{2})
35. Cimarron River
36. Clear Creek 1,497 km^{2} (578 mi^{2})
37. Cochetopa Creek
38. **Colorado River** (Note: The Colorado River did not officially flow through the State of Colorado until July 25, 1921. Prior to that date, the origin of the Colorado River was officially the confluence of the Grand and Green rivers at 38.1892°N 109.8857°W in what is now Canyonlands National Park of Utah. In 1921, U.S. Representative Edward T. Taylor of Colorado petitioned the Congressional Committee on Interstate and Foreign Commerce to rename the Grand River as the Colorado River. On July 25, 1921, President Warren G. Harding signed House Joint Resolution 32 - To change the name of the Grand River in Colorado and Utah to the Colorado River, over the objections of representatives from Wyoming, Utah, and the United States Geological Survey, who noted that the Green River was longer and had a larger drainage basin, although the Grand River often contributed a greater flow of water.)(637,137 km^{2} (246,000 mi^{2})
39. Conejos River 2,078 km^{2} (802 mi^{2})
40. Crow Creek 3,717 km^{2} (1,435 mi^{2})
41. Crystal River
42. Cucharas River
43. Culebra Creek
44. Deep Creek
45. **Dolores River** 11,998 km^{2} (4,633 mi^{2})
46. Dry Fork Michigan River
47. Eagle River 2,515 km^{2} (971 mi^{2})
48. East Fork Arkansas River
49. East Fork Cimarron River
50. East Fork Eagle River
51. East Fork Little Cimarron River
52. East Fork Navajo River
53. East Fork Piedra River
54. East Fork Rio Chama
55. East Fork San Juan River
56. East Fork South Fork Crystal River
57. East Fork Williams Fork
58. East Mancos River
59. East Rifle Creek
60. East River 762 km^{2} (294 mi^{2})
61. Elk Creek
62. Elk River
63. Encampment River
64. Escalante Creek
65. Fall River
66. Fall River
67. First Fork Piedra River
68. First Fork South Fork Piney River
69. Florida River
70. Fountain Creek 2,418 km^{2} (933 mi^{2})
71. Fraser River
72. Frenchman Creek 7,398 km^{2} (2,856 mi^{2})
73. Fryingpan River
74. Geneva Creek
75. Gore Creek
76. Grape Creek
77. **Green River** (Note: The headwaters of the Green River are located in the Wind River Mountains of the State of Wyoming.) (115,903 km^{2} (44,750 mi^{2})
78. Greenhorn Creek
79. **Gunnison River** (Note: The Gunnison River Basin is the most extensive river basin exclusively within the State of Colorado.) (20,851 km^{2} (8,051 mi^{2})
80. Henson Creek
81. Hermosa Creek
82. Hidden River
83. Hill Branch Cucharas River
84. Homestake Creek
85. Horse Creek 3,680 km^{2} (1,421 mi^{2})
86. Huerfano River 4,840 km^{2} (1,869 mi^{2})
87. Illinois River
88. Kettle Creek
89. King Arroyo
90. Kiowa Creek 1,888 km^{2} (729 mi^{2})
91. La Plata River
92. Ladder Creek 3,645 km^{2} (1,407 mi^{2})
93. Lake Fork (Arkansas River tributary)
94. Lake Fork Gunnison River
95. **Laramie River** 11,961 km^{2} (4,618 mi^{2})
96. Left Hand Creek
97. Lincoln Creek
98. Little Beaver Creek 1,602 km^{2} (619 mi^{2})
99. Little Cimarron River
100. Little Dolores River
101. Little Dry Creek
102. Little Navajo River
103. **Little Snake River** 10,629 km^{2} (4,104 mi^{2})
104. Little Thompson River
105. Lodgepole Creek 8,374 km^{2} (3,233 mi^{2})
106. Lone Tree Creek
107. Los Pinos River
108. Mancos River 2,099 km^{2} (810 mi^{2})
109. Marshall Creek
110. McElmo Creek 1,842 km^{2} (711 mi^{2})
111. Michigan River
112. Middle Fork Cimarron River
113. Middle Fork Conejos River
114. Middle Fork Elk River
115. Middle Fork Little Snake River
116. Middle Fork Piedra River
117. Middle Fork Purgatoire River
118. Middle Fork South Arkansas River
119. Middle Fork South Platte River
120. Middle Fork Swan River
121. Middle Mancos River
122. Montezuma Creek 3,044 km^{2} (1,175 mi^{2})
123. Muddy Creek
124. Navajo River
125. North Branch Conejos River
126. North Fork Animas River
127. North Fork Apishapa River
128. North Fork Arikaree River
129. North Fork Big Thompson River
130. North Fork Cache la Poudre River
131. North Fork Canadian River
132. North Fork Cimarron River 4,462 km^{2} (1,723 mi^{2})
133. North Fork Conejos River
134. North Fork Crystal River
135. North Fork Elk River
136. North Fork Fryingpan River
137. North Fork Gunnison River 2,492 km^{2} (962 mi^{2})
138. North Fork Little Snake River
139. North Fork Little Thompson River
140. North Fork Los Pinos River
141. North Fork Michigan River
142. North Fork North Platte River
143. North Fork Piney River
144. North Fork Purgatoire River
145. **North Fork Republican River** 13,172 km^{2} (5,086 mi^{2})
146. North Fork Rio de los Pinos
147. North Fork Smoky Hill River 1,965 km^{2} (759 mi^{2})
148. North Fork Snake River
149. North Fork South Arkansas River
150. North Fork South Platte River
151. North Fork Swan River
152. North Fork Vermejo River
153. North Fork West Branch Laramie River
154. North Fork West Mancos River
155. North Fork White River
156. **North Platte River** 80,755 km^{2} (31,180 mi^{2})
157. North Saint Charles River
158. Ohio Creek
159. Owl Creek
160. Parachute Creek
161. Pawnee Creek 1,875 km^{2} (724 mi^{2})
162. Piceance Creek 1,630 km^{2} (629 mi^{2})
163. Piedra River 1,770 km^{2} (683 mi^{2})
164. Piney River
165. Plateau Creek
166. Plum Creek
167. Purgatoire River 8,923 km^{2} (3,445 mi^{2})
168. Quartz Creek
169. Ralston Creek
170. Rio Blanco
171. Rio Chama 8,204 km^{2} (3,168 mi^{2})
172. Rio Chamita
173. Rio de los Pinos
174. **Rio Grande** 457,275 km^{2} (176,555 mi^{2})
175. Rio Lado
176. Rio San Antonio
177. Rito Seco
178. Roan Creek
179. Roaring Fork Little Snake River
180. Roaring Fork River 3,766 km^{2} (1,454 mi^{2})
181. Roaring River
182. Rush Creek 3,570 km^{2} (1,378 mi^{2})
183. Saguache Creek 3,482 km^{2} (1,345 mi^{2})
184. Saint Charles River
185. Saint Louis Creek
186. Saint Vrain Creek 2,572 km^{2} (993 mi^{2})
187. Salt Creek
188. **San Juan River** 64,560 km^{2} (24,927 mi^{2})
189. San Luis Creek 7,000 km^{2} (2,703 mi^{2})
190. San Miguel River 4,060 km^{2} (1,567 mi^{2})
191. Sand Arroyo Creek 1,938 km^{2} (748 mi^{2})
192. Sand Creek (Adams County)
193. Sand Creek (Colorado Springs)
194. Sand Creek (Larimer County)
195. Sangre de Cristo Creek (Costilla County)
196. Shooks Run
197. Sidney Draw 1,949 km^{2} (753 mi^{2})
198. Slate River
199. Smith Fork
200. **Smoky Hill River** 51,783 km^{2} (19,994 mi^{2})
201. Snake River
202. Snowmass Creek
203. South Arkansas River
204. South Fork Animas River
205. South Fork Beaver Creek 1,939 km^{2} (749 mi^{2})
206. South Fork Cache la Poudre River
207. South Fork Canadian River
208. South Fork Conejos River
209. South Fork Crystal River
210. South Fork Cucharas River
211. South Fork Eagle River
212. South Fork Elk River
213. South Fork Fryingpan River
214. South Fork Huerfano River
215. South Fork Little Snake River
216. South Fork Michigan River
217. South Fork Piney River
218. South Fork Purgatoire River
219. South Fork Republican River 7,195 km^{2} (2,778 mi^{2})
220. South Fork Rio Grande
221. South Fork San Miguel River
222. South Fork South Platte River
223. South Fork Swan River
224. South Fork West Mancos River
225. South Fork White River
226. **South Platte River** 62,738 km^{2} (24,223 mi^{2})
227. Spring Creek
228. Spruce Creek
229. Stollsteimer Creek
230. Stoner Creek
231. Swan River
232. Sweetwater Creek
233. Tarryall Creek
234. Taylor River 1,258 km^{2} (486 mi^{2})
235. Tenmile Creek
236. Tennessee Creek
237. Threemile Creek
238. Tomichi Creek 2,874 km^{2} (1,109 mi^{2})
239. Trinchera Creek
240. Two Butte Creek 2,107 km^{2} (814 mi^{2})
241. Uncompahgre River 2,921 km^{2} (1,128 mi^{2})
242. Vermillion Creek 2,500 km^{2} (965 mi^{2})
243. West Branch Laramie River
244. West Dolores River
245. West Fork Animas River
246. West Fork Cimarron River
247. West Fork East Fork Williams Fork
248. West Fork Elk River
249. West Fork Encampment River
250. West Fork Little Thompson River
251. West Fork North Fork Purgatoire River
252. West Fork Rio Chama
253. West Fork San Juan River
254. West Mancos River
255. **White River** 12,989 km^{2} (5,015 mi^{2})
256. White Woman Creek 3,000 km^{2} (1,158 mi^{2})
257. Williams Fork (Colorado River tributary)
258. Williams Fork (Yampa River tributary)
259. Willow Creek
260. Wind River
261. Woody Creek
262. Wolf Creek
263. **Yampa River** 21,506 km^{2} (8,304 mi^{2})
264. Yellow Creek 760 km^{2} (293 mi^{2})

== Notes ==
Of the 158 named rivers that flow through the State of Colorado, all but the Green River and Cimarron River have their headwaters in that state.

As of February 1, 2008, the U.S. Board on Geographic Names had identified 5,564 natural streams in the State of Colorado. Of this number, 147 larger streams (2.6%) were named river and 11 (0.2%) were named rio. The vast majority of the Colorado streams (5082 or 91.3%) were named creek. Of the remaining Colorado streams, 122 (2.2%) were named arroyo, 60 (1.1%) were named wash, 44 (0.8%) were named fork, 18 (0.3%) were named branch, 17 (0.3%) were named brook, 17 (0.3%) were named run, 15 (0.3%) were named rito, 10 (0.2%) were named slough, but not a single stream was named stream. Perhaps the most unusual river name in Colorado belongs to the West Fork East Fork Williams Fork located in Garfield County.

Many streams in Colorado share a name with another stream in the same state. In addition to the Canadian River that is the largest tributary of the Arkansas River, there is also a Canadian River that is a tributary of the North Platte River. In addition to the Cimarron River that is another major tributary of the Arkansas River, there is also a Cimarron River that is a tributary of the Gunnison River. There is a Fall River that is a tributary of the Big Thompson River as well as a Fall River that is a tributary of Clear Creek.

There are 72 streams in the State of Colorado that are named Willow Creek, 71 streams named Spring Creek, 53 streams named Cottonwood Creek, 49 streams named Bear Creek, 49 streams named Beaver Creek, 48 streams named Dry Creek, 33 streams named Rock Creek, 33 streams named Sand Creek, and 32 streams named Mill Creek. The Arkansas River and the Colorado River flow through Colorado, as do a Florida River, an Idaho Creek, an Illinois River, an Indiana Creek, a Maryland Creek, a Michigan River, a Minnesota Creek, six Missouri Creeks, a Montana Creek, two New York Creeks, two Ohio Creeks, two Pennsylvania Creeks, two Tennessee Creeks, seven Texas Creeks, and a Virginia Creek.

== Tributary chart ==
The following tributary chart shows many important streams that flow through the State of Colorado including all 158 named rivers. The chart is arranged by tributary and area of the drainage basin. The names of the 17 Colorado rivers with a drainage basin of more than 10,000 square kilometers (3,900 sq mi) are shown in bold. Oceans and streams outside of Colorado are shown in italics.

Pacific Ocean

1. Gulf of California
  1. Colorado River
    1. Green River
      1. **Yampa River** 21,506 km^{2} (8,304 mi^{2})
        1. **Little Snake River** 10,629 km^{2} (4,104 mi^{2})
          1. Roaring Fork Little Snake River
          2. Middle Fork Little Snake River
          3. North Fork Little Snake River
          4. South Fork Little Snake River
        2. Bear River
        3. Elk River
          1. South Fork Elk River
          2. Middle Fork Elk River
          3. North Fork Elk River
        4. Williams Fork
          1. East Fork Williams Fork
      2. **White River** 12,989 km^{2} (5,015 mi^{2})
        1. Piceance Creek 1,630 km^{2} (629 mi^{2})
        2. Yellow Creek 760 km^{2} (293 mi^{2})
        3. North Fork White River
        4. South Fork White River
      3. Vermillion Creek 2,500 km^{2} (965 mi^{2})
    2. upper Colorado River, formerly the Grand River
      1. **Gunnison River** 20,851 km^{2} (8,051 mi^{2})
        1. Uncompahgre River 2,921 km^{2} (1,128 mi^{2})
        2. Tomichi Creek 2,874 km^{2} (1,109 mi^{2})
          1. Marshall Creek
          2. Cochetopa Creek
          3. Quartz Creek
        3. Cebolla Creek
        4. North Fork Gunnison River 2,492 km^{2} (962 mi^{2})
        5. Smith Fork
        6. Blue Creek
        7. Lake Fork Gunnison River
          1. Henson Creek
        8. Taylor River 1,258 km^{2} (486 mi^{2})
        9. East River 762 km^{2} (294 mi^{2})
          1. Slate River
        10. Ohio Creek
        11. Cimarron River
          1. Little Cimarron River
            1. East Fork Little Cimarron River
          2. East Fork Cimarron River
          3. Middle Fork Cimarron River
          4. West Fork Cimarron River
        12. Escalante Creek
      2. **Dolores River** 11,998 km^{2} (4,633 mi^{2})
        1. San Miguel River 4,060 km^{2} (1,567 mi^{2})
          1. South Fork San Miguel River
        2. West Dolores River
        3. Rio Lado
      3. Roaring Fork River 3,766 km^{2} (1,454 mi^{2})
        1. Lincoln Creek
        2. Castle Creek
        3. Woody Creek
        4. Snowmass Creek
        5. Fryingpan River
          1. North Fork Fryingpan River
          2. South Fork Fryingpan River
        6. Crystal River
          1. North Fork Crystal River
          2. South Fork Crystal River
            1. East Fork South Fork Crystal River
        7. Cattle Creek
        8. Threemile Creek
      4. Deep Creek
      5. Sweetwater Creek
      6. Eagle River 2,515 km^{2} (971 mi^{2})
        1. Gore Creek
        2. Homestake Creek
        3. East Fork Eagle River
        4. South Fork Eagle River
      7. Blue River 1,770 km^{2} (683 mi^{2})
        1. Snake River
          1. North Fork Snake River
        2. Tenmile Creek
        3. Swan River
          1. Middle Fork Swan River
          2. North Fork Swan River
          3. South Fork Swan River
      8. Little Dolores River
      9. Fraser River
        1. Saint Louis Creek
      10. Williams Fork
        1. East Fork Williams Fork
          1. West Fork East Fork Williams Fork
      11. Piney River
        1. North Fork Piney River
        2. South Fork Piney River
          1. First Fork South Fork Piney River
      12. Elk Creek
      13. Rifle Creek
        1. East Rifle Creek
      14. Parachute Creek
      15. Roan Creek
      16. Plateau Creek
      17. Muddy Creek
      18. Willow Creek
    3. **San Juan River** 64,560 km^{2} (24,927 mi^{2})
      1. Animas River 3,562 km^{2} (1,375 mi^{2})
        1. Hermosa Creek
        2. Florida River
        3. North Fork Animas River
        4. South Fork Animas River
        5. West Fork Animas River
      2. Montezuma Creek 3,044 km^{2} (1,175 mi^{2})
      3. Mancos River 2,099 km^{2} (810 mi^{2})
        1. East Mancos River
          1. Middle Mancos River
        2. West Mancos River
          1. North Fork West Mancos River
          2. South Fork West Mancos River
      4. McElmo Creek 1,842 km^{2} (711 mi^{2})
      5. Piedra River 1,770 km^{2} (683 mi^{2})
        1. First Fork Piedra River
        2. East Fork Piedra River
        3. Middle Fork Piedra River
        4. Stollsteimer Creek
      6. La Plata River
      7. Navajo River
        1. Little Navajo River
        2. East Fork Navajo River
      8. Los Pinos River
        1. North Fork Los Pinos River
      9. Rio Blanco
      10. East Fork San Juan River
      11. West Fork San Juan River
        1. Wolf Creek

Atlantic Ocean

1. Gulf of Mexico
  1. Mississippi River
    1. Missouri River
      1. Platte River
        1. **North Platte River** 80,755 km^{2} (31,180 mi^{2})
          1. **Laramie River** 11,961 km^{2} (4,618 mi^{2})
            1. Sand Creek
            2. West Branch Laramie River
              1. North Fork West Branch Laramie River
          2. Encampment River
            1. West Fork Encampment River
          3. Canadian River
            1. North Fork Canadian River
            2. South Fork Canadian River
          4. Michigan River
            1. Illinois River
            2. North Fork Michigan River
            3. South Fork Michigan River
            4. Dry Fork Michigan River
          5. North Fork North Platte River
        2. **South Platte River** 62,738 km^{2} (24,223 mi^{2})
          1. Lodgepole Creek 8,374 km^{2} (3,233 mi^{2})
          2. Cache la Poudre River 4,959 km^{2} (1,915 mi^{2})
            1. North Fork Cache la Poudre River
            2. South Fork Cache la Poudre River
            3. Spring Creek
          3. Crow Creek 3,717 km^{2} (1,435 mi^{2})
          4. Bijou Creek 3,612 km^{2} (1,395 mi^{2})
          5. Beaver Creek 2,939 km^{2} (1,135 mi^{2})
          6. Saint Vrain Creek 2,572 km^{2} (993 mi^{2})
            1. Boulder Creek 1,160 km^{2} (448 mi^{2})
            2. Left Hand Creek
          7. Big Thompson River 2,149 km^{2} (830 mi^{2})
            1. Little Thompson River
              1. North Fork Little Thompson River
              2. West Fork Little Thompson River
            2. Fall River
              1. Roaring River
            3. North Fork Big Thompson River
            4. Aspen Brook
              1. Wind River
            5. Spruce Creek
              1. Hidden River
            6. Fish Creek
          8. Sidney Draw 1,949 km^{2} (753 mi^{2})
          9. Box Elder Creek
          10. Kiowa Creek 1,888 km^{2} (729 mi^{2})
          11. Pawnee Creek 1,875 km^{2} (724 mi^{2})
          12. Clear Creek 1,497 km^{2} (578 mi^{2})
            1. Ralston Creek
            2. Fall River
          13. Cherry Creek 1,050 km^{2} (405 mi^{2})
          14. Plum Creek
          15. North Fork South Platte River
            1. Geneva Creek
          16. Middle Fork South Platte River
          17. South Fork South Platte River
          18. Lone Tree Creek
            1. Owl Creek
          19. Tarryall Creek
          20. Sand Creek
          21. Bear Creek 339 km^{2} (131 mi^{2})
          22. Big Dry Creek (Littleton, Colorado)
          23. Big Dry Creek (Westminster, Colorado)
          24. Little Dry Creek
      2. Kansas River
        1. Republican River
          1. **North Fork Republican River** 13,172 km^{2} (5,086 mi^{2})
          2. Arikaree River 4,429 km^{2} (1,710 mi^{2})
            1. North Fork Arikaree River
          3. Frenchman Creek 7,398 km^{2} (2,856 mi^{2})
          4. Sappa Creek
            1. Beaver Creek
              1. South Fork Beaver Creek 1,939 km^{2} (749 mi^{2})
              2. Little Beaver Creek 1,602 km^{2} (619 mi^{2})
          5. South Fork Republican River 7,195 km^{2} (2,778 mi^{2})
        2. **Smoky Hill River** 51,783 km^{2} (19,994 mi^{2})
          1. Ladder Creek 3,645 km^{2} (1,407 mi^{2})
          2. North Fork Smoky Hill River 1,965 km^{2} (759 mi^{2})
    2. **Arkansas River** 478,501 km^{2} (184,750 mi^{2})
      1. **Tennessee Creek**
      2. **Lake Fork**
      3. Badger Creek
      4. Beaver Creek
      5. **Canadian River** 122,701 km^{2} (47,375 mi^{2})
        1. Vermejo River
          1. North Fork Vermejo River
      6. **Cimarron River** 44,890 km^{2} (17,332 mi^{2})
        1. North Fork Cimarron River 4,462 km^{2} (1,723 mi^{2})
          1. Sand Arroyo Creek 1,938 km^{2} (748 mi^{2})
      7. Purgatoire River 8,923 km^{2} (3,445 mi^{2})
        1. North Fork Purgatoire River
          1. West Fork North Fork Purgatoire River
        2. Middle Fork Purgatoire River
        3. South Fork Purgatoire River
      8. Huerfano River 4,840 km^{2} (1,869 mi^{2})
        1. Cucharas River
          1. Hill Branch Cucharas River
          2. South Fork Cucharas River
        2. South Fork Huerfano River
      9. Big Sandy Creek 4,825 km^{2} (1,863 mi^{2})
        1. Rush Creek 3,570 km^{2} (1,378 mi^{2})
      10. Horse Creek 3,680 km^{2} (1,421 mi^{2})
      11. Apishapa River 2,798 km^{2} (1,080 mi^{2})
        1. North Fork Apishapa River
      12. Fountain Creek 2,418 km^{2} (933 mi^{2})
        1. Shooks Run
      13. Salt Creek
      14. Two Butte Creek 2,107 km^{2} (814 mi^{2})
      15. Chico Creek 1,934 km^{2} (747 mi^{2})
      16. South Arkansas River
        1. Middle Fork South Arkansas River
        2. North Fork South Arkansas River
      17. Grape Creek
      18. Saint Charles River
        1. North Saint Charles River
        2. Greenhorn Creek
      19. East Fork Arkansas River
      20. Chalk Creek
      21. Bear Creek Basin (endorheic basin)
        1. Bear Creek 4,500 km^{2} (1,737 mi^{2})
      22. White Woman Basin (endorheic basin)
        1. White Woman Creek 3,000 km^{2} (1,158 mi^{2})
  2. **Rio Grande** 457,275 km^{2} (176,555 mi^{2})
    1. Rio Chama 8,204 km^{2} (3,168 mi^{2})
      1. Rio Chamita
      2. East Fork Rio Chama
      3. West Fork Rio Chama
    2. Conejos River 2,078 km^{2} (802 mi^{2})
      1. Rio San Antonio
        1. Rio de los Pinos
          1. North Fork Rio de los Pinos
      2. Middle Fork Conejos River
      3. North Branch Conejos River
      4. North Fork Conejos River
      5. South Fork Conejos River
      6. Adams Fork Conejos River
    3. South Fork Rio Grande
    4. Alamosa River 383 km^{2} (148 mi^{2})
    5. Trinchera Creek
      1. Sangre de Cristo Creek
    6. Culebra Creek
      1. Rito Seco
    7. San Luis Closed Basin (endorheic basin)
      1. San Luis Creek 7,000 km^{2} (2,703 mi^{2})
        1. Saguache Creek 3,482 km^{2} (1,345 mi^{2})
      2. Carnero Creek

== See also ==
- Hydrology
  - Surface-water hydrology
    - Drainage basin
- Bibliography of Colorado
- Geography of Colorado
- History of Colorado
- Index of Colorado-related articles
- List of Colorado-related lists
- Outline of Colorado
