= Chamita River =

River in Colorado and New Mexico, US

Rio Chamita

Physical characteristics
- Source
  - location: Archuleta County, Colorado
  - coordinates: 37°01′59″N 106°41′16″W
- Mouth
  - location: Confluence with Rio Chama
  - coordinates: 36°51′28″N 106°35′22″W
  - elevation: 7,684 ft (2,342 m)

Basin features
- Progression: Rio Chama—Rio Grande

Rio Chamita is a tributary of the Rio Chama in the United States. The stream flows south from a source in Archuleta County, Colorado, to a confluence with the Rio Chama in Rio Arriba County, New Mexico.

== See also ==
- List of rivers of Colorado
- List of rivers of New Mexico
