= Two Butte Creek =

River in the US

Physical characteristics
- Source
  - coordinates: 37°16′44″N 103°20′43″W
- Mouth
  - location: Confluence with Arkansas
  - coordinates: 38°02′33″N 102°07′33″W
  - elevation: 3,389 ft (1,033 m)
- Basin size: 814 sq mi (2,110 km^{2})

Basin features
- Progression: Arkansas—Mississippi

Two Butte Creek is a 152-mile-long (245 km) tributary of the Arkansas River that flows from a source near Kim, Colorado, USA. It joins the Arkansas just south of the town of Holly.

== See also ==
- List of rivers of Colorado
