= Fish Creek (Larimer County, Colorado) =

Physical characteristics
- Source
  - location: Lily Lake
  - coordinates: 40°18′26″N 105°32′17″W
  - elevation: 8,927 ft (2,721 m)
- Mouth
  - location: Confluence with Big Thompson
  - coordinates: 40°22′14″N 105°29′35″W
  - elevation: 7,484 ft (2,281 m)

Basin features
- Progression: Big Thompson; South Platte—Platte; Missouri—Mississippi

Fish Creek is a tributary of the Big Thompson River in Larimer County, Colorado. The stream's source is Lily Lake in Roosevelt National Forest. It flows northeast to a confluence with the Big Thompson in Lake Estes.

== See also ==
- List of rivers of Colorado
