= Sweetwater Creek (Colorado River tributary) =

- The creek at a point along Sweetwater Road in Eagle County (2026)

- Location of the mouth in Colorado

Location
- Countries: United States
- States: Colorado
- Counties: Garfield and Eagle

Physical characteristics
- Source
  - location: Garfield County, Colorado
  - coordinates: 39°54′5.94″N 107°13′18.19″W
- Mouth: Colorado River
  - location: Eagle County, Colorado
  - coordinates: 39°43′17.95″N 107°2′5.17″W
- Length: 21 miles (34 kilometers)

Basin features
- Progression: Colorado River
- Tributaries
  - left: Turret Creek; Hack Creek; Sheep Creek
  - right: Dry Sweetwater Creek; Cross Creek; Lake Creek; Gruner Creek; Riland Creek; Mason Creek; Morris Creek; Irrawaddy Creek
- Waterbodies: Rim Lake; Sweetwater Lake

Sweetwater Creek is a tributary of the Colorado River in Garfield and Eagle counties in Colorado, U.S. The creek passes through Sweetwater Lake, a natural lake in Garfield County.

== Course ==
The creek rises high in the Flat Tops Wilderness Area in the White River National Forest. It soon passes through a small lake called Rim Lake. From there, it flows south then southeast to Sweetwater Lake, a natural lake and the site of the Sweetwater Lake Recreation Area, managed by the White River National Forest. From here, the creek flows along Sweetwater Road, passing from Garfield County to Eagle County to its confluence with the Colorado River north of Dotsero, Colorado.

== See also ==
- List of rivers of Colorado
