= West Fork Little Thompson River =

Physical characteristics
- Source
  - coordinates: 40°15′38″N 105°29′47″W
- Mouth
  - location: Confluence with Little Thompson
  - coordinates: 40°17′16″N 105°22′31″W
  - elevation: 6,696 ft (2,041 m)

Basin features
- Progression: Little Thompson; Big Thompson; South Platte—Platte; Missouri—Mississippi

West Fork Little Thompson River is a tributary of the Little Thompson River in northern Colorado. It flows from a source in Roosevelt National Forest southwest of Twin Sisters Peaks to a confluence with the Little Thompson.

== See also ==
- List of rivers of Colorado
