= Carnero Creek (Colorado) =

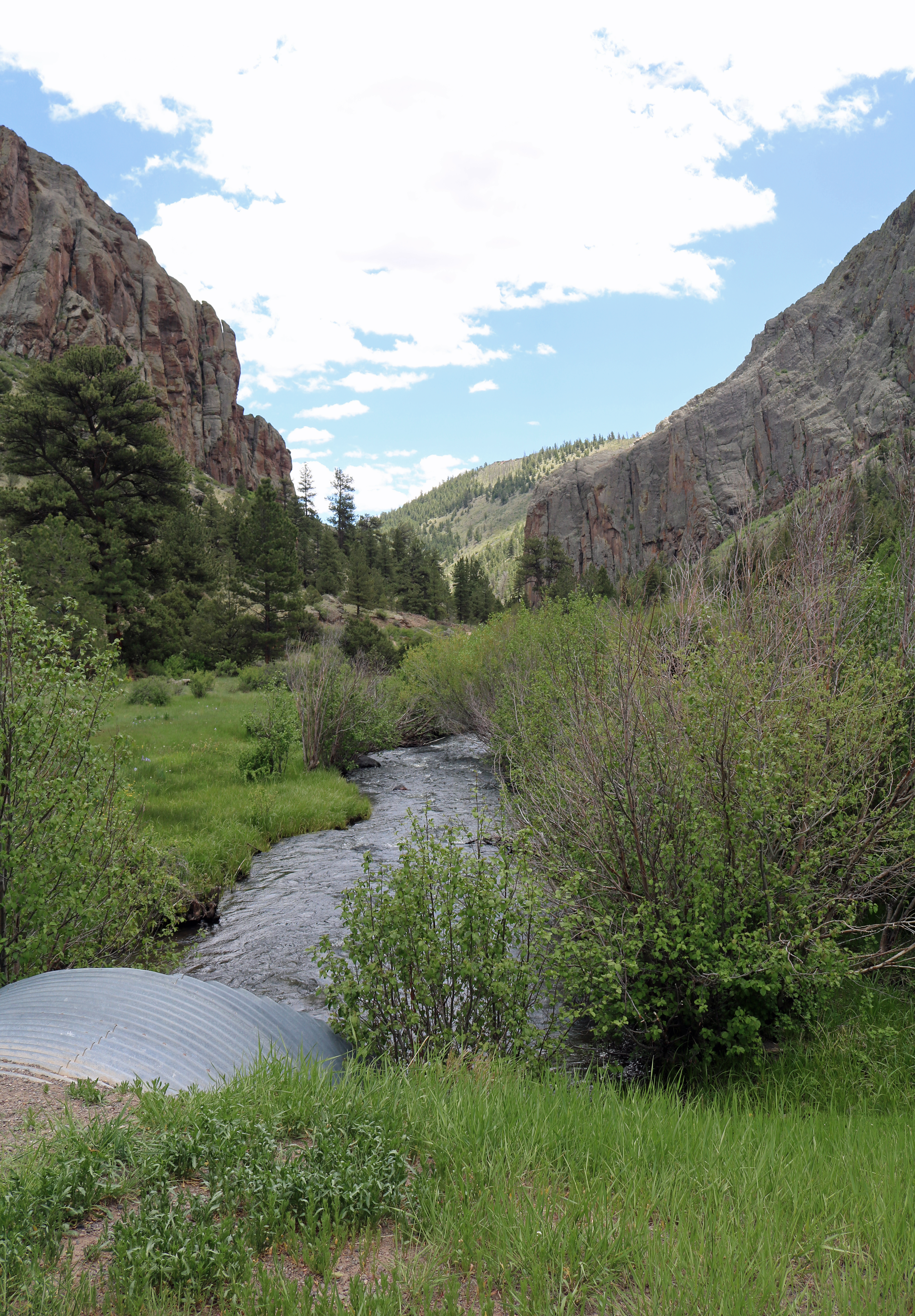
- Looking downstream towards Hellgate, a gap

- Location of the creek's mouth in Colorado

Location
- Country: United States
- State: Colorado
- County: Saguache County

Physical characteristics
- Source: Confluence of South Carnero Creek and Middle Carnero Creek
  - coordinates: 37°54′18″N 106°23′36.12″W
- Mouth
  - coordinates: 37°51′17″N 106°12′9.1″W
  - elevation: 7,687 feet (2,343 meters)
- Discharge
  - location: San Luis Closed Basin

Basin features
- Progression: San Luis Closed Basin
- Landmarks: Hellgate, Carnero Creek Pictographs

Carnero Creek is a stream in Saguache County, Colorado. Carnero is a name derived from Spanish meaning 'sheep'.

The creek rises at the confluence of South Fork Carnero Creek and Middle Fork Carnero Creek. North Fork Carnero Creek joins Carnero Creek after this confluence.

Maps show the creek ending in a field between the Rio Grande Canal and U.S. Route 285, its flow lost to irrigation ditch diversions, seepage, and evaporation. This mouth of the creek is within the San Luis Closed Basin.

== Fauna ==
The creek, a perennial stream, is home to a healthy population of native Rio Grande cutthroat trout. The creek also provides important foraging habitat for peregrine falcons.

== Rock art ==
The Carnero Creek Pictographs take their name from the creek. The pictographs are listed on the National Register of Historic Places, but their exact location along the creek is not publicly known, though one source indicates they are on the L-Cross Ranch, which lies along the creek near La Garita, Colorado.

== See also ==
- List of rivers of Colorado
