= Parachute Creek =

Physical characteristics
- Source
  - location: Confluence of East Fork Parachute Creek and Middle Fork Parachute Creek
  - coordinates: 39°34′37″N 108°06′28″W
  - elevation: 5,785 ft (1,763 m)
- Mouth
  - location: Confluence with Colorado River
  - coordinates: 39°26′23″N 108°03′13″W
  - elevation: 5,056 ft (1,541 m)

Parachute Creek is a 14.7-mile-long (23.7 km) tributary of the Colorado River in Garfield County, Colorado. The confluence with the Colorado is just south of the community of Parachute and east of U.S. Route 6.

== See also ==
- List of rivers of Colorado
- List of tributaries of the Colorado River
