= Elk Creek (Colorado River tributary) =

- Looking downstream from a footbridge in New Castle (2026)

- Location of the mouth in Colorado

Location
- Countries: United States
- States: Colorado
- Counties: Garfield

Physical characteristics
- Source: Confluence of West Elk Creek and Main Elk Creek
  - location: Garfield County, Colorado
  - coordinates: 39°36′18″N 107°35′7″W
- Mouth: Confluence with the Colorado River
  - location: New Castle, Colorado
  - coordinates: 39°34′8.01″N 107°32′20.4″W
- Length: 4.5 miles (7.2 kilometers)
- Basin size: 180 square miles (470 square kilometers)

Basin features
- Progression: Colorado River
- Tributaries
  - left: East Elk Creek

Elk Creek is a tributary of the Colorado River in Garfield County, Colorado, U.S.

== Course ==
The creek rises northwest of New Castle at the confluence of West Elk Creek and Main Elk Creek just north of the intersection of Buford Road and Main Elk Road. From there, the creek flows southeast to the west of Buford Road, passing through the west side of New Castle, then under Main Street there and under Interstate 70, where it joins the Colorado River.

== Stream gauge ==
The USGS operates a stream gauge along the creek at New Castle .34 miles (0.55 kilometers) north of its mouth.

== See also ==
- List of rivers of Colorado
