= Little Dolores River =

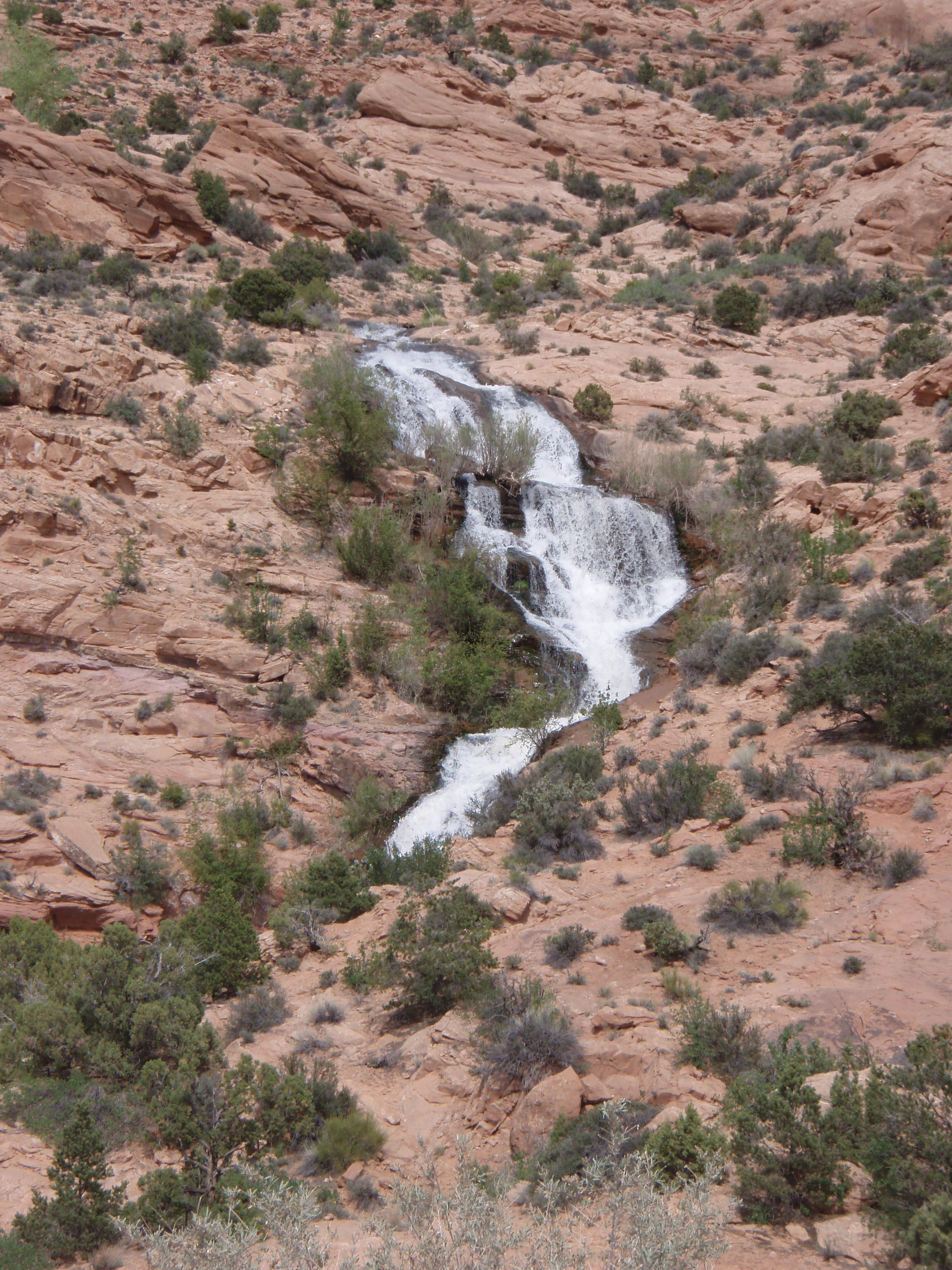

Physical characteristics
- Source
  - coordinates: 39°52′33″N 108°48′04″W
- Mouth
  - location: Confluence with Colorado River
  - coordinates: 39°00′54″N 109°08′44″W
  - elevation: 4,252 ft (1,296 m)

Basin features
- Progression: Colorado

Little Dolores River is a 41.1-mile-long (66.1 km) tributary that flows into the Colorado River in Grand County, Utah from a source in Mesa County, Colorado.

== See also ==
- List of rivers of Colorado
- List of tributaries of the Colorado River
