= West Fork Cimarron River =

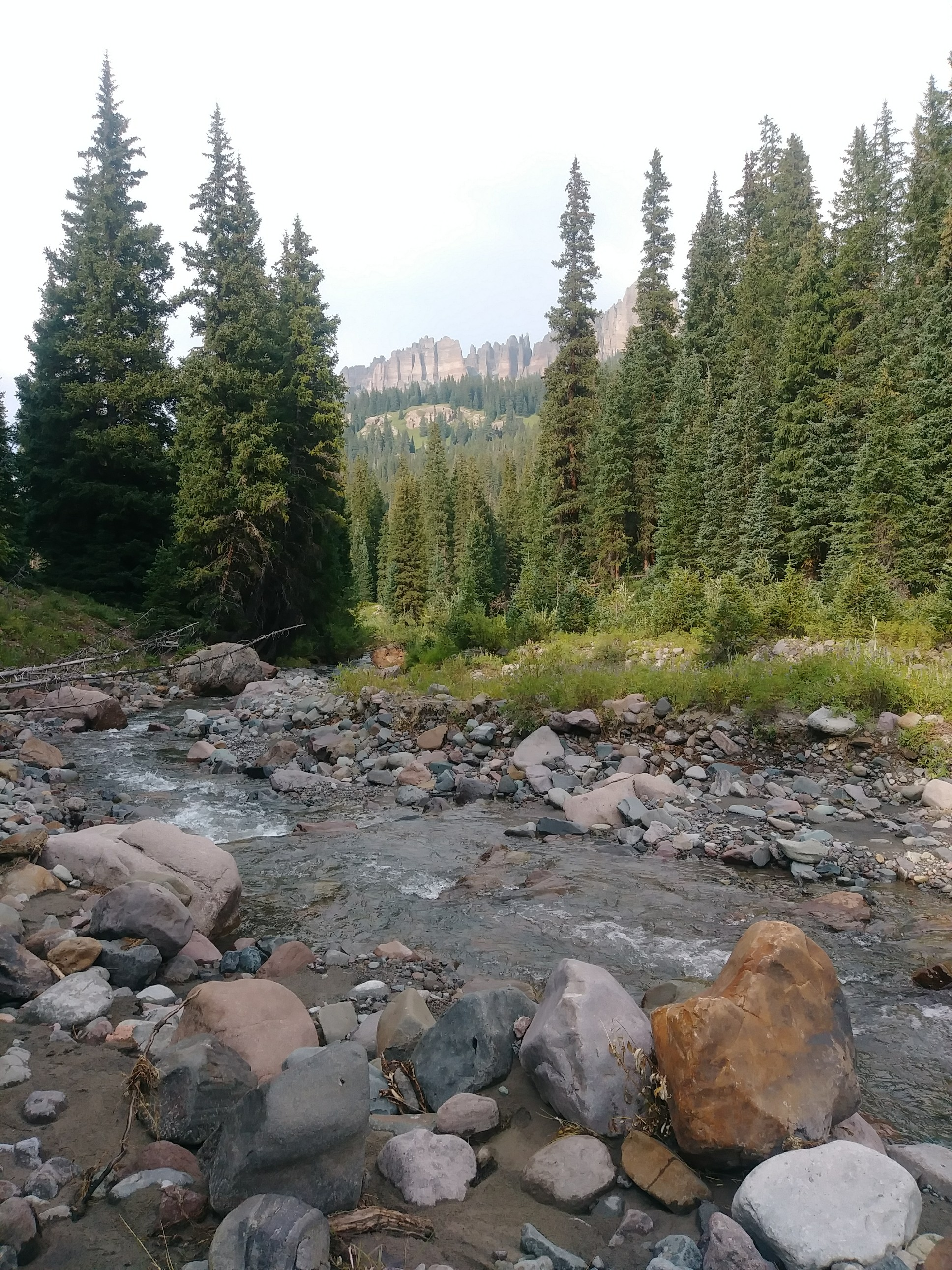
- West Fork of the Cimarron River at 10,300 ft. elevation

Physical characteristics
- Source
  - location: Uncompahgre Wilderness, Hinsdale County, Colorado
  - coordinates: 38°05′06″N 107°33′04″W
- Mouth
  - location: Confluence with Cimarron
  - coordinates: 38°13′36″N 107°32′20″W
  - elevation: 8,930 ft (2,720 m)

Basin features
- Progression: Cimarron—Gunnison—Colorado

West Fork Cimarron River is an 11.8-mile-long (19.0 km) tributary of the Cimarron River in Colorado. The river's source is west of Coxcomb Peak in the Uncompahgre Wilderness of Hinsdale County. It joins the Cimarron River in Gunnison County.

== Gallery ==
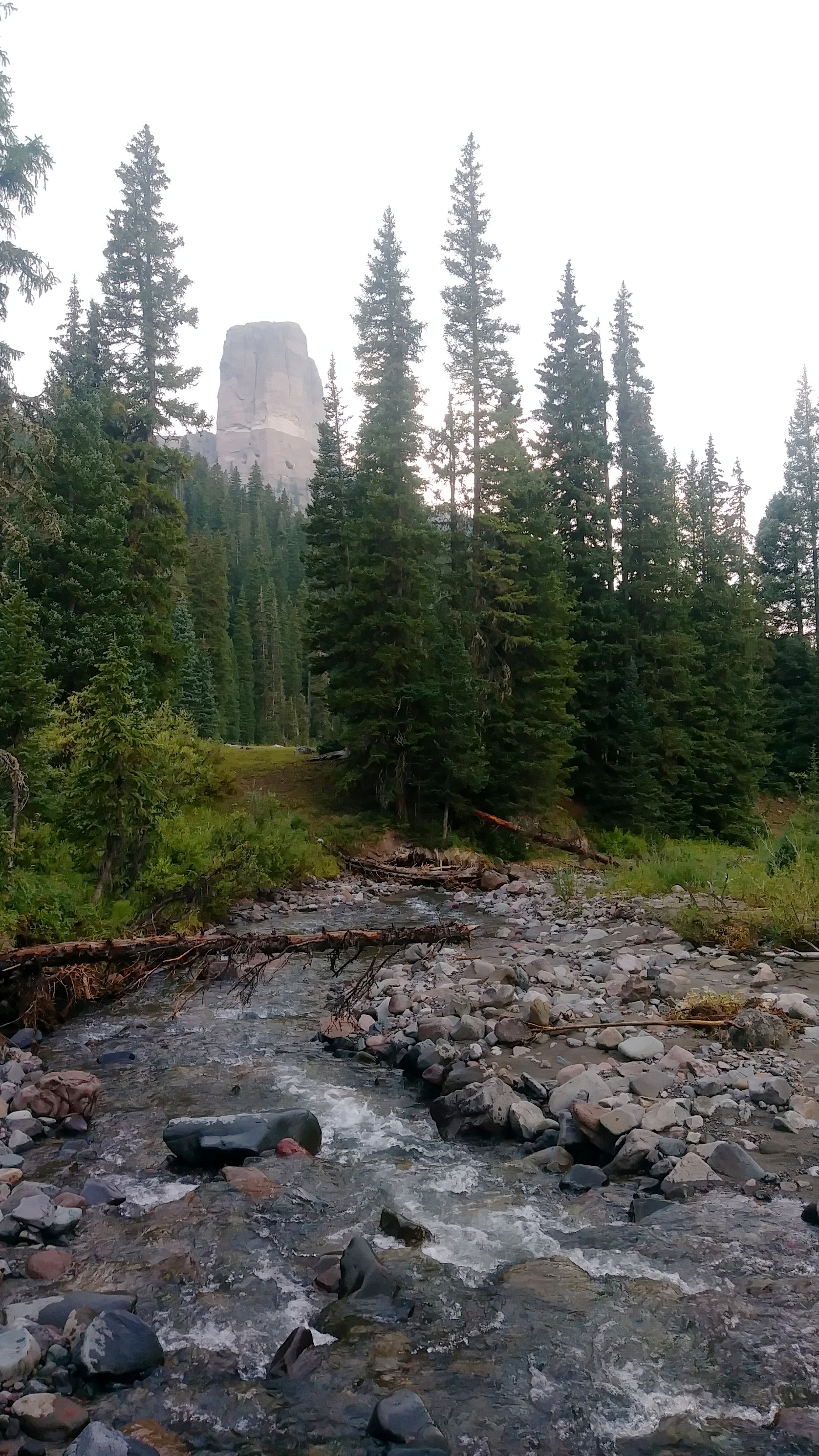
West Fork of the Cimarron River at 10,200 ft. elevation, with Chimney Rock in the background. Pictured at low flow in the month of August.

== See also ==
- List of rivers of Colorado
- List of tributaries of the Colorado River
