= North Fork Arikaree River =

River in Colorado, U.S.

Physical characteristics
- Source
  - coordinates: 39°28′51″N 103°37′14″W
- Mouth
  - location: Confluence with Arikaree
  - coordinates: 39°35′03″N 103°05′50″W
  - elevation: 4,711 ft (1,436 m)

Basin features
- Progression: Arikaree—Republican—Kansas— Missouri—Mississippi

The North Fork Arikaree River is a 50.1-mile-long (80.6 km) tributary of the Arikaree River in eastern Colorado. It flows from a source in western Lincoln County to a confluence with the Arikaree River in Washington County.

== See also ==
- List of Colorado rivers
