= South Fork Piney River =

Physical characteristics
- Source
  - coordinates: 39°42′25″N 106°30′32″W
- Mouth
  - location: Confluence with Piney River
  - coordinates: 39°46′10″N 106°30′42″W
  - elevation: 7,818 ft (2,383 m)

Basin features
- Progression: Piney—Colorado

South Fork Piney River is a tributary of the Piney River in Eagle County, Colorado. The river flows north from a source near Red and White Mountain in the White River National Forest to a confluence with the Piney River.

== See also ==
- List of rivers of Colorado
- List of tributaries of the Colorado River
