= Yellow Creek (Colorado) =

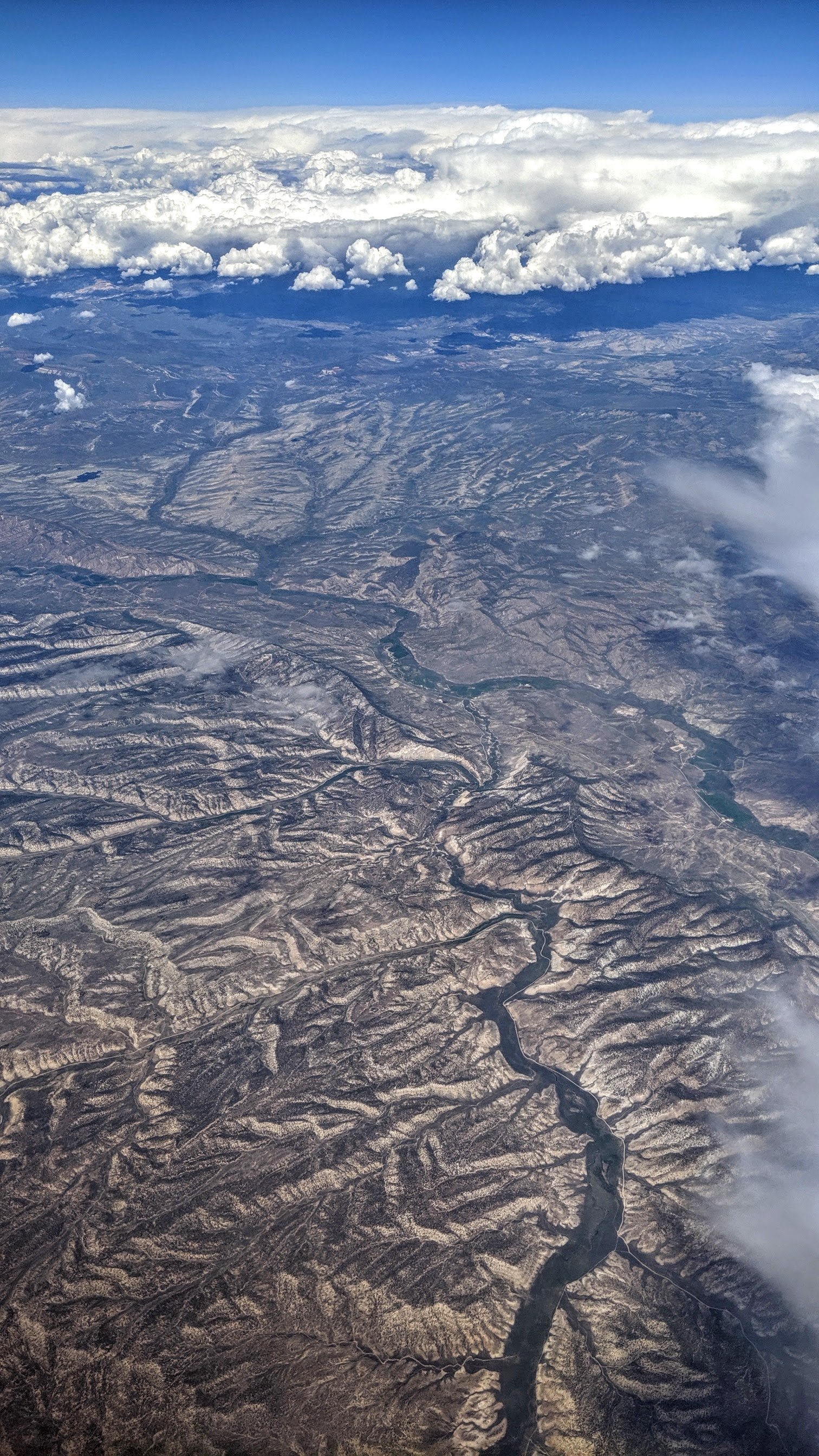

Physical characteristics
- Source
  - coordinates: 39°49′42″N 108°35′16″W
- Mouth
  - location: Confluence with White River
  - coordinates: 40°10′21″N 108°24′11″W
  - elevation: 5,525 ft (1,684 m)

Basin features
- Progression: White—Green—Colorado

Yellow Creek is a 24.7-mile-long (39.8 km) tributary of the White River in Rio Blanco County, Colorado.

== See also ==
- List of rivers of Colorado
- List of tributaries of the Colorado River
