= South Fork Rio Grande =

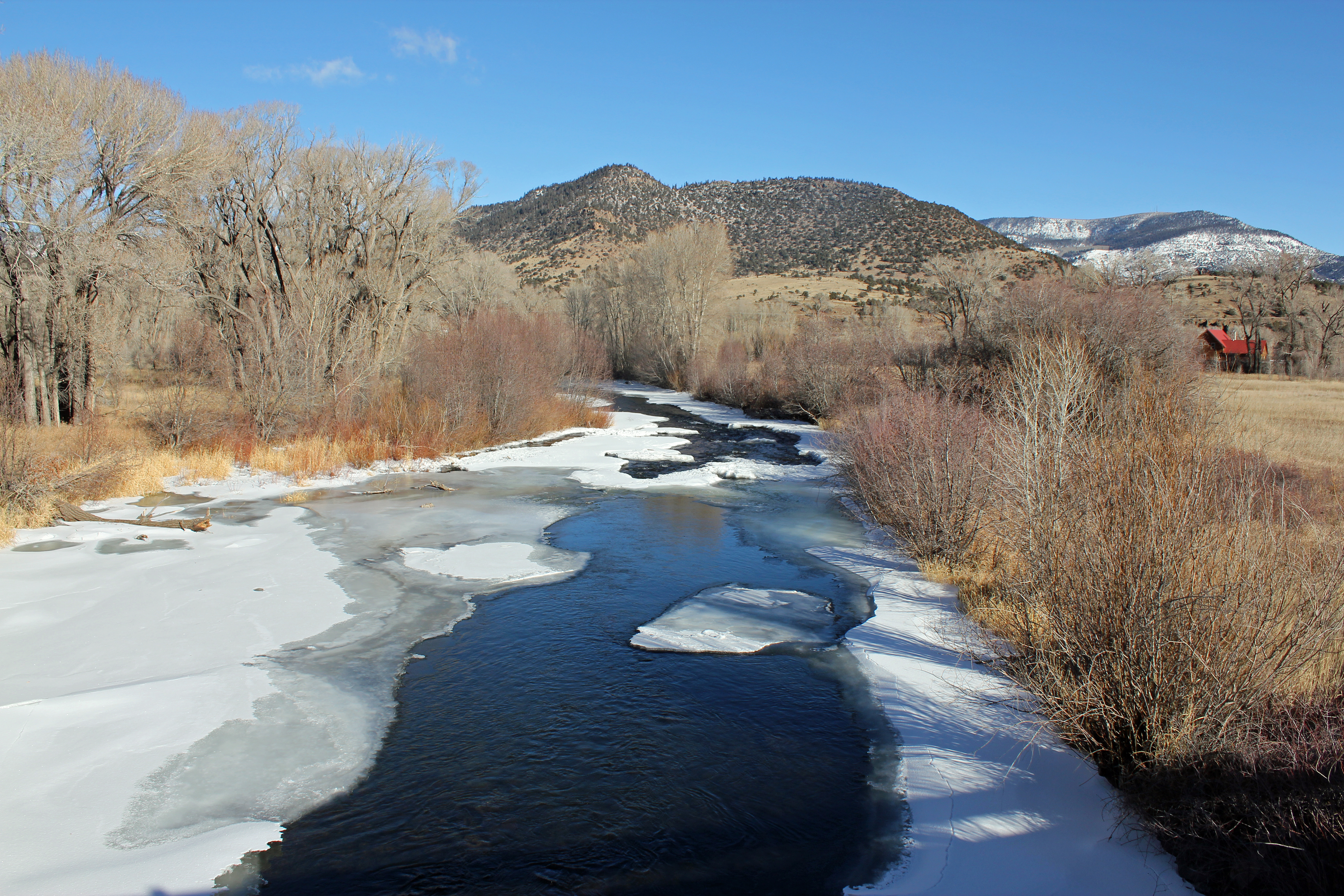
- The river in South Fork, Colorado, just before it empties into the Rio Grande.

Physical characteristics
- Source
  - location: Mineral County, Colorado
  - coordinates: 37°31′02″N 106°52′54″W
- Mouth
  - location: Confluence with Rio Grande
  - coordinates: 37°40′25″N 106°38′06″W
  - elevation: 8,172 ft (2,491 m)

Basin features
- Progression: Rio Grande

South Fork Rio Grande is a tributary of the Rio Grande in southern Colorado in the United States. It flows from a source in the Weminuche Wilderness of the San Juan Mountains to a confluence with the Rio Grande at the town of South Fork in Rio Grande County, Colorado.

== See also ==
- List of rivers of Colorado
