= North Fork Vermejo River =

Physical characteristics
- Source
  - coordinates: 37°01′14″N 105°05′52″W
- Mouth
  - location: Confluence with Little Vermejo Creek
  - coordinates: 36°58′32″N 105°07′43″W
  - elevation: 8,373 ft (2,552 m)

Basin features
- Progression: Vermejo—Canadian—Arkansas—Mississippi

North Fork Vermejo River is a tributary of the Vermejo River. The river flows from Las Animas County, Colorado, south to a confluence with Little Vermejo Creek in Colfax County, New Mexico, that forms the Vermejo River.

== See also ==
- List of rivers of Colorado
- List of rivers of New Mexico
