= Horse Creek (Colorado) =

Physical characteristics
- Source
  - coordinates: 38°59′32″N 104°18′59″W
- Mouth
  - location: Confluence with Arkansas
  - coordinates: 38°04′22″N 103°19′35″W
  - elevation: 3,944 ft (1,202 m)
- Basin size: 1,421 mi^{2} (3,680 km^{2})

Basin features
- Progression: Arkansas—Mississippi

Horse Creek is a 129-mile-long (208 km) tributary of the Arkansas River that flows from a source south of Calhan in the Holcolm Hills of El Paso County, Colorado. It flows east and south to a confluence with the Arkansas in Bent County west of Las Animas

== See also ==
- List of rivers of Colorado
