= East Fork Williams Fork =

River in Colorado, United States

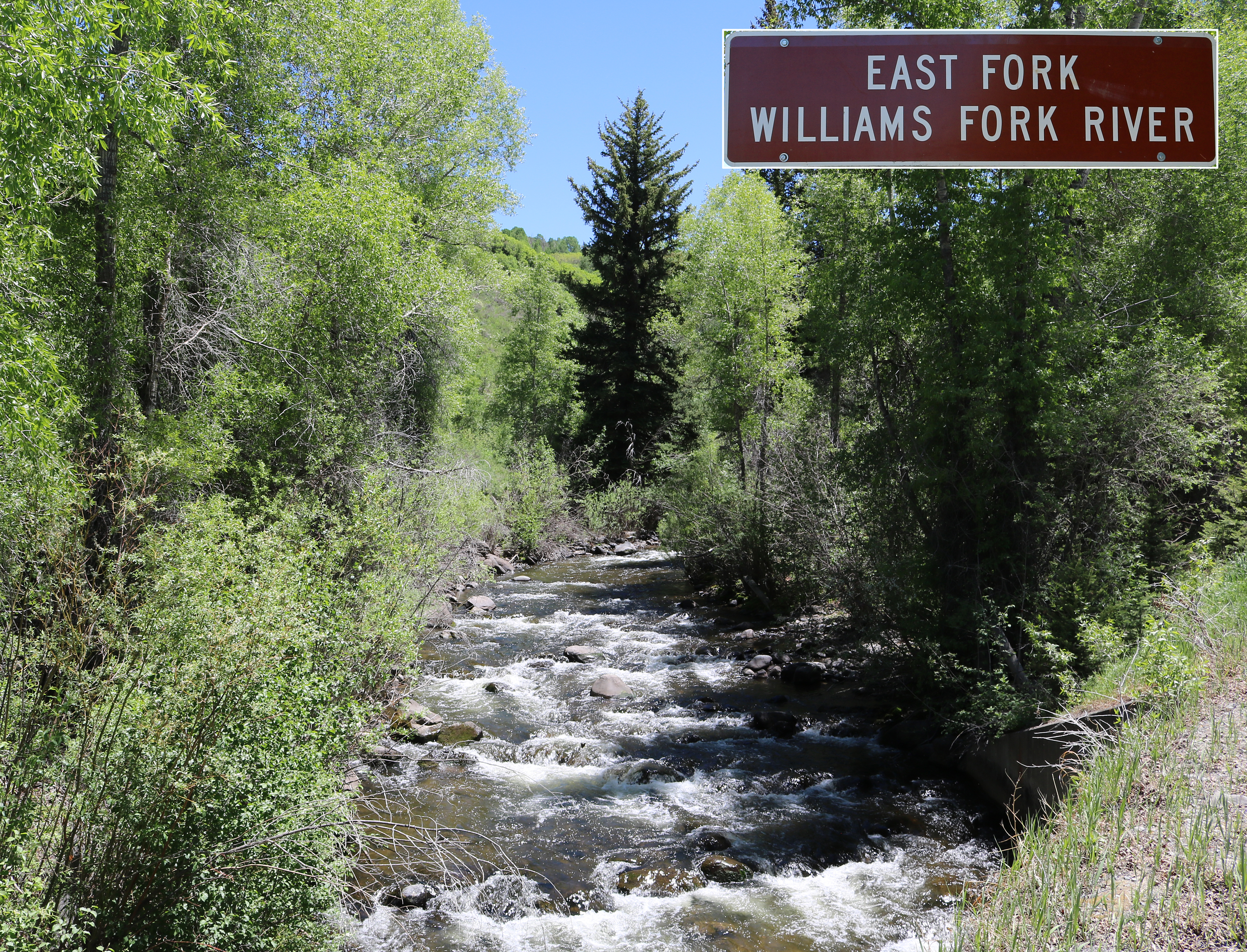
- The river just before it goes under County Road 8 in the Routt National Forest

Physical characteristics
- Source
  - location: Devils Causeway
  - coordinates: 40°02′27″N 107°09′50″W
- Mouth
  - location: Confluence with South Fork Williams Fork
  - coordinates: 40°19′05″N 107°24′39″W
  - elevation: 6,558 feet (1,999 meters)

Basin features
- Progression: Williams Fork → Yampa → Green → Colorado
- Tributaries
  - left: West Fork East Fork Williams Fork; Bridge Creek; Poose Creek
  - right: Black Mountain Creek; Baldy Creek; Bunker Creek; Willow Creek

The East Fork Williams Fork is a tributary of the Williams Fork in north central Colorado in the United States. The river merges with the South Fork Williams Fork to form the Williams Fork.

== See also ==
- List of rivers of Colorado
