= Vermejo River =

Physical characteristics
- Source
  - location: Confluence of North Fork and Little Vermejo Creek
  - coordinates: 36°58′32″N 105°07′41″W
- Mouth
  - location: Confluence with Canadian
  - coordinates: 36°29′12″N 104°32′38″W
  - elevation: 5,827 ft (1,776 m)
- Discharge
  - location: near Maxwell
  - average: 9 cu ft/s (0.25 m^{3}/s)

Basin features
- Progression: Canadian—Arkansas—Mississippi

Vermejo River is a tributary of the Canadian River in Colfax County, New Mexico. The river flows southeast from the confluence of North Fork Vermejo River and Little Vermejo Creek to a confluence with the Canadian River south of Maxwell. The upper course of the Vermejo flows through Vermejo Reserve, one of the largest ranches in the U.S. and now devoted primarily to recreation such as fishing and hunting.

Vermejo (usually spelled bermejo) means "reddish" in Spanish and has the same origin as the word "vermilion".

== See also ==
- List of rivers of New Mexico
