= Spruce Creek (Larimer County, Colorado) =

Physical characteristics
- Source
  - coordinates: 40°20′05″N 105°43′30″W
- Mouth
  - location: Confluence with Big Thompson
  - coordinates: 40°21′02″N 105°39′50″W
  - elevation: 8,419 ft (2,566 m)

Basin features
- Progression: Big Thompson; South Platte—Platte; Missouri—Mississippi

Spruce Creek is a tributary of the Big Thompson River in Larimer County, Colorado. The stream's source is near Sprague Pass in Rocky Mountain National Park. It flows east through Spruce Canyon to a confluence with the Big Thompson in Forest Canyon.

== See also ==
- List of rivers of Colorado
