= Stoner Creek (Colorado) =

Stream in Dolores County, Colorado, U.S.

Coordinates: 37°35′31″N 108°19′19″W

Stoner Creek is a stream in Dolores County, Colorado, in the United States.

The creek was named for the rocky character of its bed.

== See also ==
- List of rivers of Colorado
