= Little Cimarron River =

Physical characteristics
- Source
  - coordinates: 38°06′59″N 107°27′01″W
- Mouth
  - location: Confluence with Cimarron River
  - coordinates: 38°24′52″N 107°31′39″W
  - elevation: 7,047 ft (2,148 m)

Basin features
- Progression: Cimarron—Gunnison—Colorado

Little Cimarron River is a 24.6-mile-long (39.6 km) tributary that joins the Cimarron River in Montrose County, Colorado. The river's source is near Silver Peak in the Uncompahgre Wilderness of Hinsdale County.

== See also ==
- List of rivers of Colorado
- List of tributaries of the Colorado River
