= Williams Fork (Yampa River tributary) =

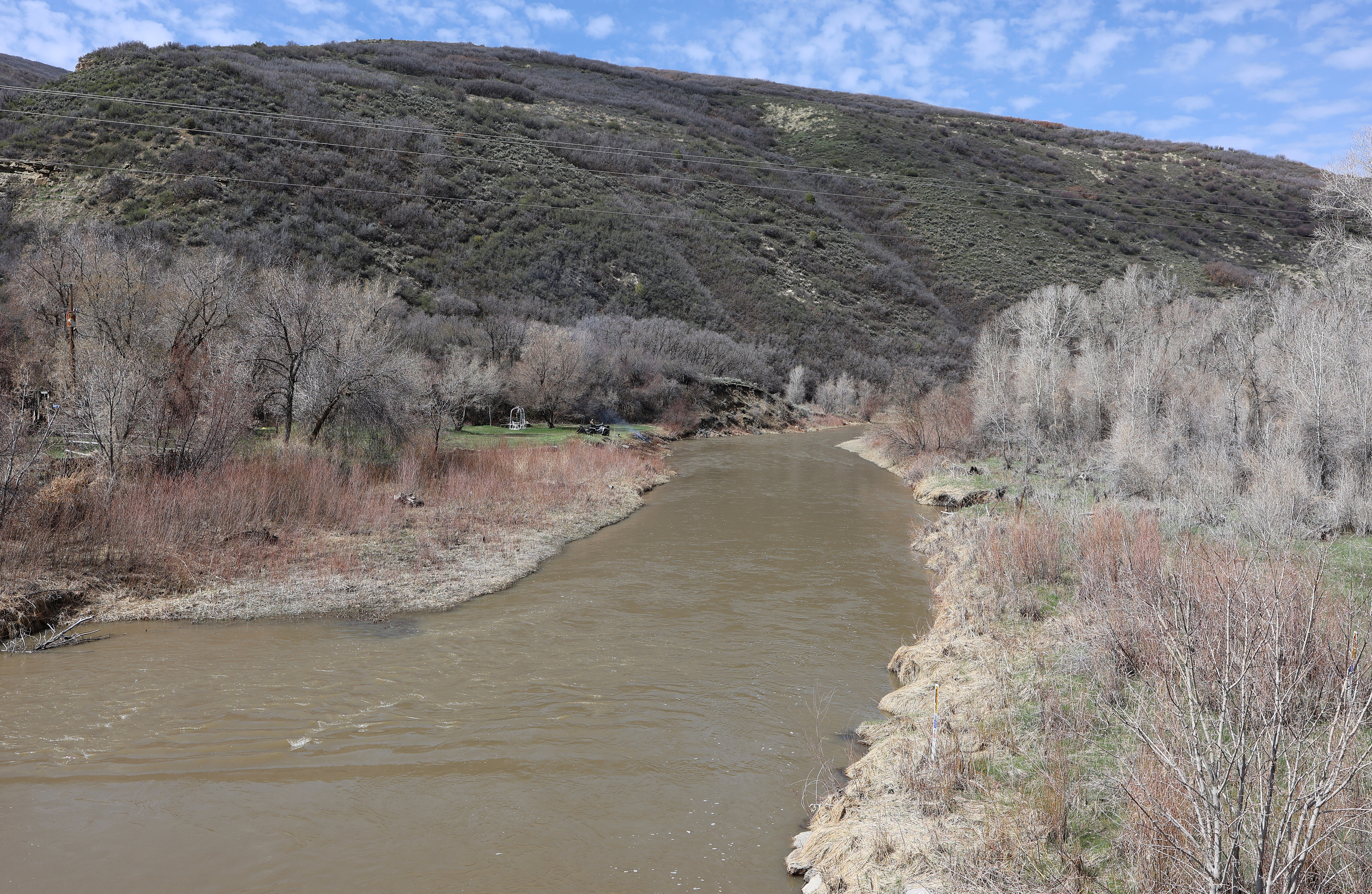
- The river at Hamilton, Colorado

Physical characteristics
- Source
  - location: Confluence of East Fork Williams Fork and South Fork Williams Fork
  - coordinates: 40°19′05″N 107°24′39″W
- Mouth
  - location: Confluence with Yampa River
  - coordinates: 40°26′26″N 107°39′17″W
  - elevation: 6,122 ft (1,866 m)

Basin features
- Progression: Yampa—Green—Colorado

The Williams Fork is a 27.4-mile-long (44.1 km) tributary of the Yampa River, in north central Colorado in the United States.

== See also ==
- List of rivers of Colorado
- List of tributaries of the Colorado River
