= Piney River (Colorado) =

Tributary of the Colorado River

Physical characteristics
- Source
  - location: Upper Piney Lake
  - coordinates: 39°42′47″N 106°18′17″W
  - elevation: 11,066 ft (3,373 m)
- Mouth
  - location: Confluence with Colorado River
  - coordinates: 39°51′17″N 106°38′30″W
  - elevation: 6,762 ft (2,061 m)

Basin features
- Progression: Colorado

Piney River is a 28.2-mile-long (45.4 km) tributary of the Colorado River in Eagle County, Colorado. The river flows northwest from Upper Piney Lake in the Eagles Nest Wilderness to a confluence with the Colorado River.

== See also ==
- List of rivers of Colorado
- List of tributaries of the Colorado River
