= Aspen (disambiguation) =

Aspen is a common name for several species of trees in the genus Populus and for some in the genus Acronychia.

Aspen may also refer to:

== Business ==
- Aspen Airways, a former airline that was based in Denver, Colorado
- Aspen Avionics, an American aircraft avionics manufacturer
- Aspen Comics, American entertainment company and comic book publisher
- Aspen Dental, a dental practice management corporation
- Aspen Education Group, a company that provides therapeutic interventions for adolescents and young adults
- Aspen Healthcare, a private medical company based in the City of London
- Aspen Medical, a global provider of health services based in Canberra, Australia
- Aspen Pharmacare, a multi-national pharmaceutical manufacturing company based in South Africa
- Aspen Publishers
- Aspen Skiing Company, known locally as "Ski Co"
- Aspen Soda, an apple-flavored soft drink sold from 1978 until 1982
- Aspen Technology, an engineering software company

== Arts and entertainment ==
- Aspen Art Museum, Aspen, Colorado
- Aspen Music Festival and School, a classical music festival
- Aspen Matthews, protagonist of the comic book series Fathom
- Aspen (magazine), a multimedia magazine of the arts published from 1965 to 1971

== People ==
- Aspen (name), a list of people with the given name or surname

== Places ==
=== United States ===
- Aspen, Colorado, a ski resort town
- Aspen/Snowmass, a winter resort complex in Pitkin County, Colorado
- Aspen Mountain (ski area), on the north slopes of Aspen Mountain
- Aspen Mountain (Colorado), south of the town of Aspen
- Aspen anomaly, a geological structure in Colorado
- Aspen Brook (Colorado), a tributary of the Big Thompson River
- Aspen Mountain (Wyoming), south of Rock Springs
- Aspen Lake, west of Klamath Falls, Oregon

=== Other countries ===
- Aspen, Nova Scotia, Canada, a community
- Queen Elizabeth II Island, formerly Aspen Island, Canberra, Australian Capital Territory, Australia
- Aspen, Botkyrka, a lake in Botkyrka Municipality, Sweden
- Aspen (Julita), a lake in Katrineholm Municipality, Sweden

== Transportation ==
- Chrysler Aspen, a sport utility vehicle
- Dodge Aspen, a compact car
- Aspen (ship, 1947), see Boats of the Mackenzie River watershed

== Other uses ==
- Aspen, a brand of alkylate gasoline
- Aspen University, a for-profit, distance-learning university
- Aspen High School, Aspen, Colorado
- USCGC Aspen, a United States Coast Guard cutter
- Aspen, a type of cervical collar

== See also ==
- Aspen Shale, a geologic formation in Wyoming
- Aspen hawk-moth
- Aspen Hall (disambiguation)
- Aspen Hill (disambiguation)
- Aspen Institute, an American nonprofit cultural organization
- Aspin (disambiguation)
