= Wind River (Colorado) =

Physical characteristics
- Source
  - coordinates: 40°18′03″N 105°36′02″W
- Mouth
  - location: Confluence with Aspen Brook
  - coordinates: 40°20′15″N 105°33′54″W
  - elevation: 7,933 ft (2,418 m)

Basin features
- Progression: Aspen—Big Thompson; South Platte—Platte; Missouri—Mississippi

Wind River is a tributary of Aspen Brook in Larimer County, Colorado. The stream flows northeast from a source in Rocky Mountain National Park to a confluence with Aspen Brook in the Roosevelt National Forest.
