= Aspen Hill =

Aspen Hill may refer to:

- Aspen Hill, Maryland, a community
- Aspen Hill, Tennessee, a community
- Aspen Hill (Charles Town, West Virginia), listed on the National Register of Historic Places

== See also ==
- Aspen (disambiguation)
- Aspen Hall (disambiguation)
