= Aspen Hall =

Aspen Hall may refer to:

- Aspen Hall (Pittsboro, North Carolina), listed on the NRHP in North Carolina
- Aspen Hall (Martinsburg, West Virginia), listed on the NRHP in West Virginia
- Aspen Hall (Harrodsburg, Kentucky), listed on the NRHP in Kentucky

== See also ==
- Aspen (disambiguation)
- Aspen Hill (disambiguation)
