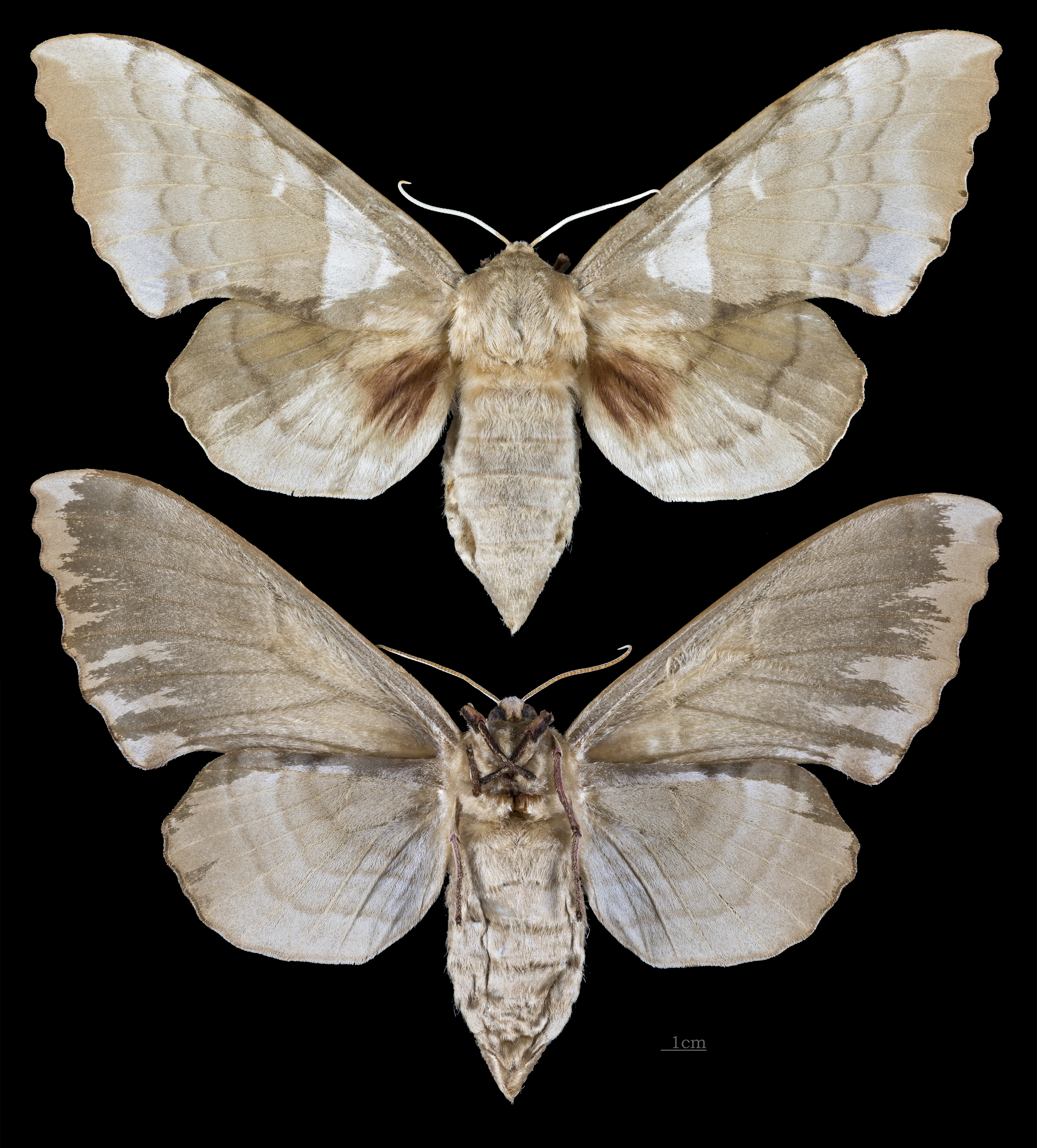

Scientific classification
- Domain: Eukaryota
- Kingdom: Animalia
- Phylum: Arthropoda
- Class: Insecta
- Order: Lepidoptera
- Family: Sphingidae
- Genus: Laothoe
- Species: L. austanti

Binomial name
- Laothoe austanti (Staudinger, 1877)

Synonyms
- Smerinthus austauti Staudinger, 1877; Smerinthus poupillieri Bellier de la Chavignerie, 1878; Laothoe iberica Eitschberger, Danner & Surholt, 1989; Amorpha austauti aurantiaca Oberthür, 1916; Amorpha austauti brunnea Huard, 1928; Laothoe austauti incarnata Austaut, 1880; Laothoe austauti mirabilis Austaut, 1883; Smerinthus austauti flava Bartel, 1900; Smerinthus austauti staudingeri (Austaut, 1879)

= Laothoe austanti =

Maghreb poplar hawkmoth

Species of moth

Laothoe austanti, the Maghreb poplar hawkmoth, is a moth of the family Sphingidae. The species was first described by Otto Staudinger in 1877. It is known from the Atlas Mountains and coastal plains of Morocco, northern Algeria and Tunisia and the neighbouring desert areas. The habitat consists of poplar- and willow-lined streams and rivers.

The wingspan is 95–120 mm. It is larger and generally paler than similar Laothoe populi. There is a dark brown form (form brunnea).

There are usually two generations per year, with adults on wing from April to May and again from July to August. In some years there is a third generation.

The larvae feed on Salix and Populus species.

== Etymology ==
Staudinger named the species for Jules Léon Austaut, but made a spelling mistake and named it Smerinthus austanti instead. The amended epithet, austauti, is preserved as "an unjustified emendation is in prevailing usage" under Article 33.2.3.1 of the ICZN Code.
