= Laothoe populetorum =

Scientific classification
- Domain: Eukaryota
- Kingdom: Animalia
- Phylum: Arthropoda
- Class: Insecta
- Order: Lepidoptera
- Family: Sphingidae
- Genus: Laothoe
- Species: L. populetorum

Binomial name
- Laothoe populetorum (Staudinger, 1887)

Synonyms
- Smerinthus populetorum Staudinger, 1887

Species of moth

Laothoe populetorum is a species of moth of the family Sphingidae. It is found in Kyrgyzstan. It is mostly treated as a variety or form of Laothoe populi.
