= Aspen Mountain =

Aspen Mountain may refer to:

- Aspen Mountain (Colorado), a mountain in Colorado
- Aspen Mountain (ski area), a ski resort on the mountain
- Aspen Mountain (Wyoming), a mountain in Wyoming

== See also ==
- Aspen (disambiguation)
