= Aspin =

Aspin may refer to:

- Askal, a Philippine native dog; also known as Aspin
- Aspin-en-Lavedan, village and commune in the Hautes-Pyrénées, France
  - Col d'Aspin, the col close to this village
- Aspin valve, an automotive component
- Les Aspin (1938–1995), U.S. Congressman and Secretary of Defense
- Neil Aspin (born 1965), English footballer
- "Soph Aspin Send", a 2016 song by British rapper Millie B; commonly known as "M to the B"
- Turbomeca Aspin, a small jet engine

== See also ==
- Aspen (disambiguation)
