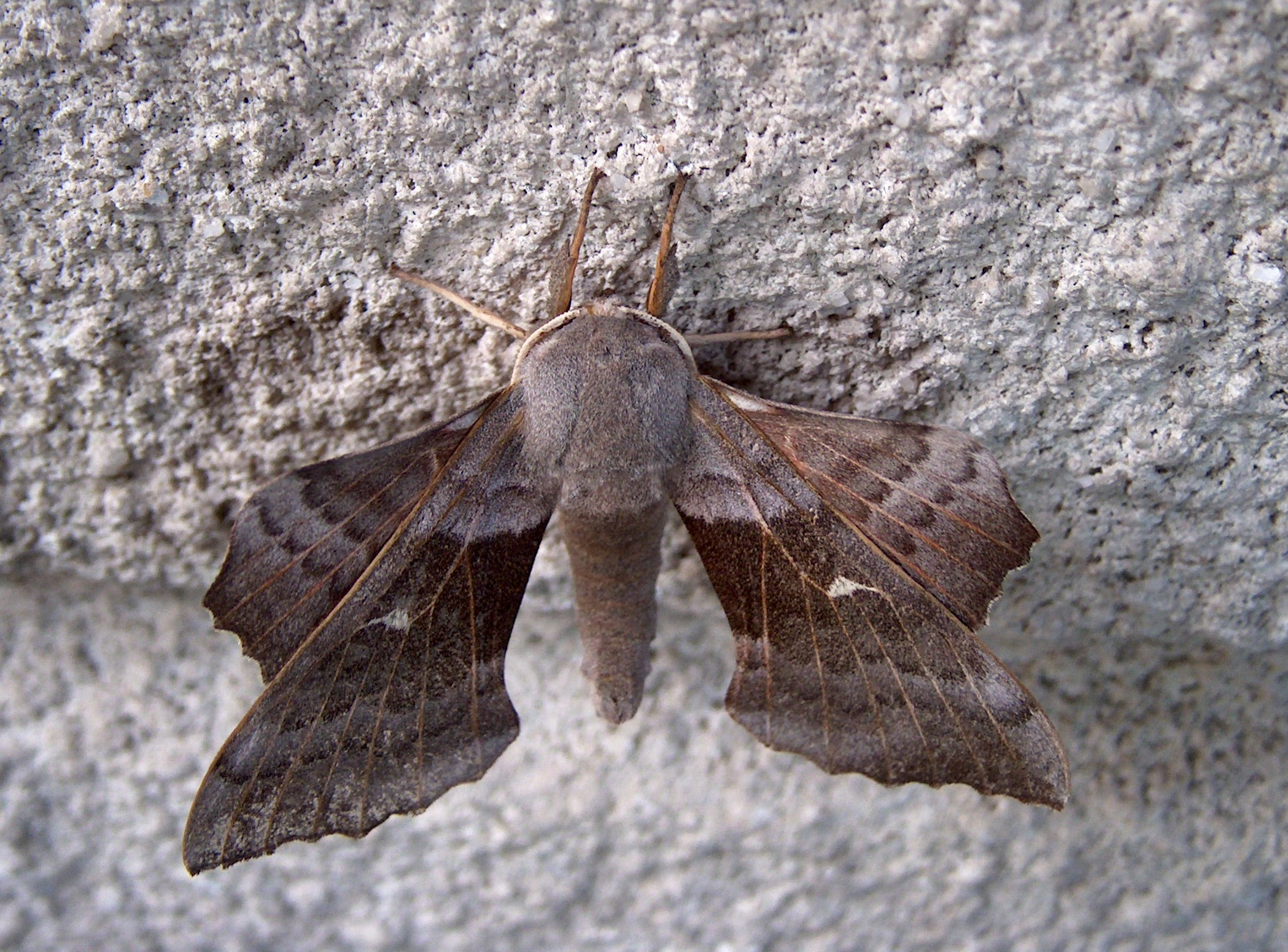
- Laothoe populi

Scientific classification
- Domain: Eukaryota
- Kingdom: Animalia
- Phylum: Arthropoda
- Class: Insecta
- Order: Lepidoptera
- Family: Sphingidae
- Tribe: Smerinthini
- Genus: Laothoe; Fabricius, 1807

Synonyms
- Amorpha Hübner, 1806 [non Hübner, 1809]

= Laothoe (moth) =

Genus of moths

Laothoe is a genus of moths in the family Sphingidae first distinguished by Johan Christian Fabricius in 1807.

== Species ==
- Laothoe amurensis (Staudinger, 1892)
- Laothoe austanti (Staudinger, 1877)
- Laothoe habeli Saldaitis, Ivinskis & Borth, 2010
- Laothoe philerema (Djakonov, 1923)
- Laothoe populeti (Bienert, 1870)
- Laothoe populetorum (Staudinger, 1887)
- Laothoe populi (Linnaeus, 1758)
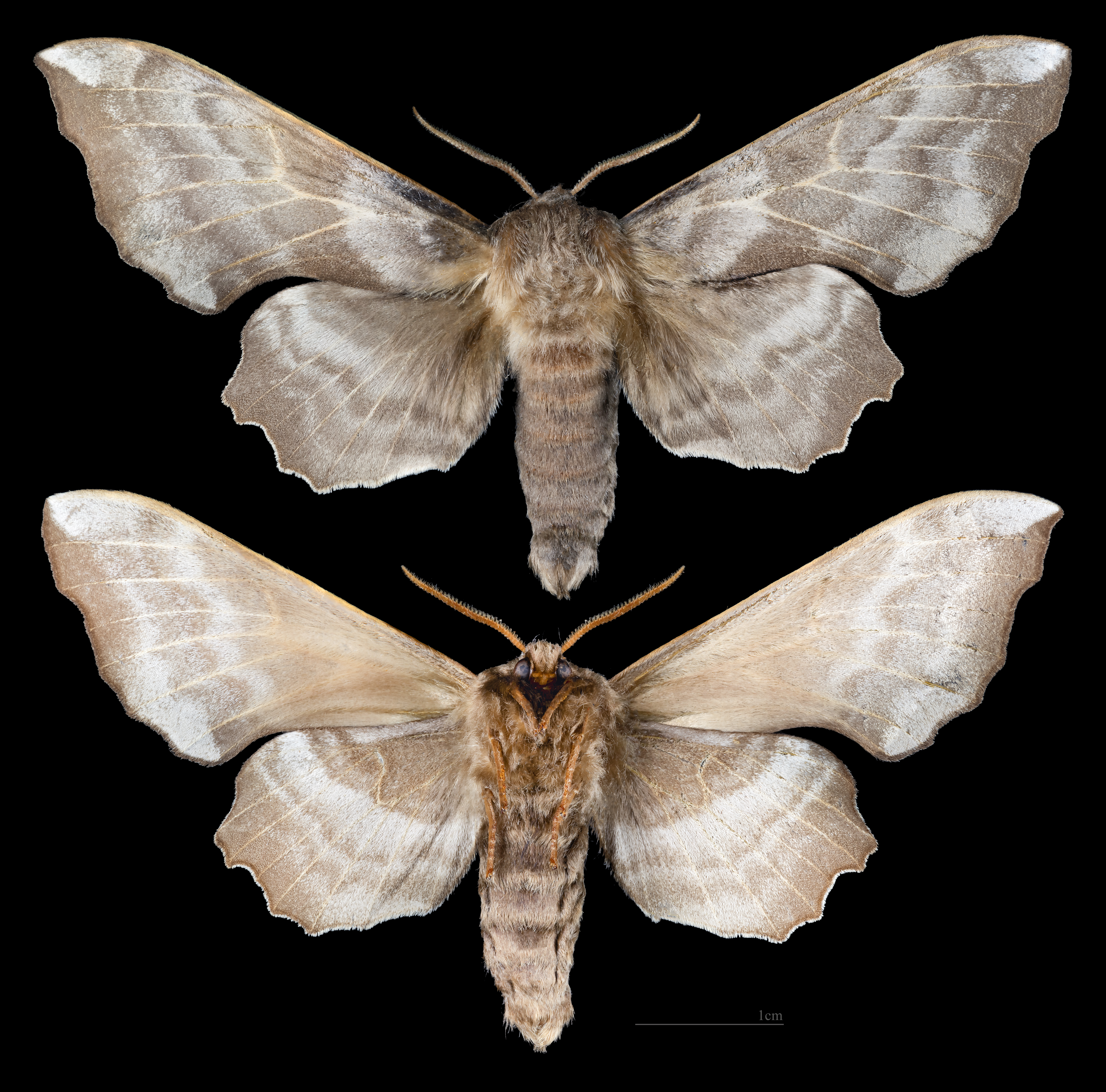
Laothoe amurensis

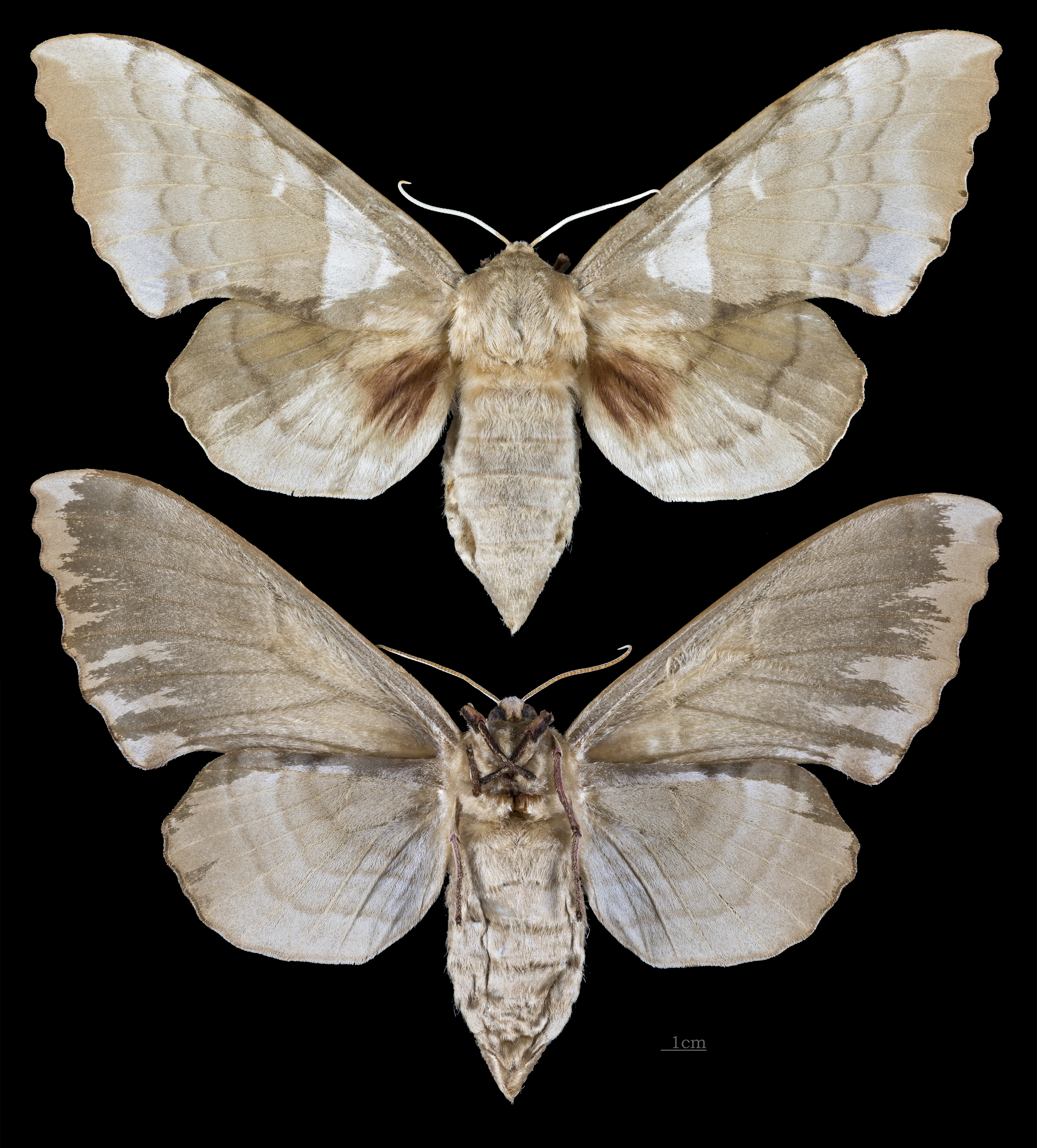
Laothoe austauti

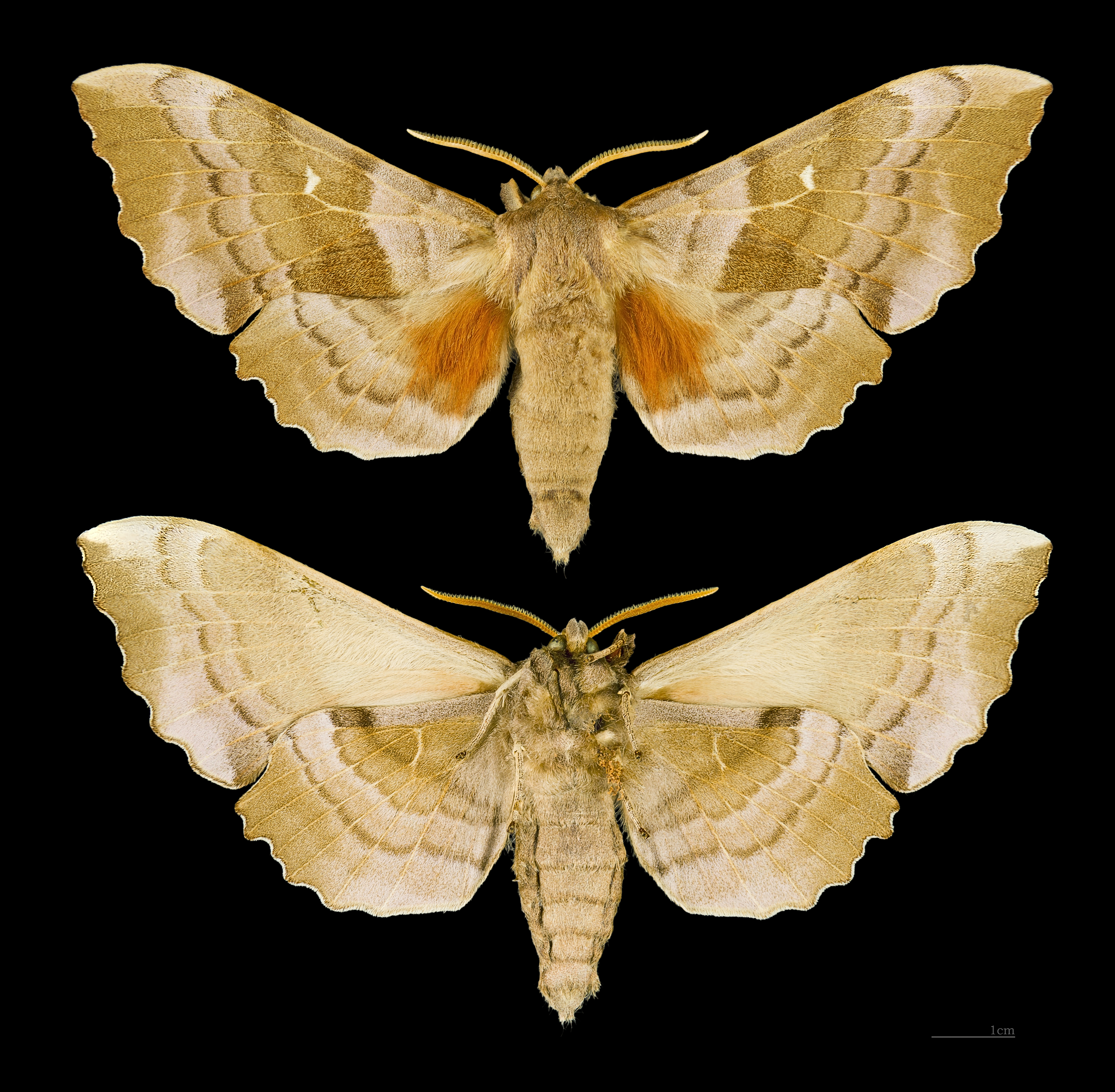
Laothoe populi
