= Laothoe habeli =

Scientific classification
- Kingdom: Animalia
- Phylum: Arthropoda
- Clade: Pancrustacea
- Class: Insecta
- Order: Lepidoptera
- Family: Sphingidae
- Genus: Laothoe
- Species: L. habeli

Binomial name
- Laothoe habeli Saldaitis, Ivinskis & Borth, 2010

Species of moth

Laothoe habeli is a moth of the family Sphingidae found in China. In Shaanxi, it is found at elevations between 1,500 and 1,900 meters; in Sichuan it is found up to 2,400 meters.

The wingspan is 60–74 mm. There is one generation per year with adults on wing from May to June or July.
