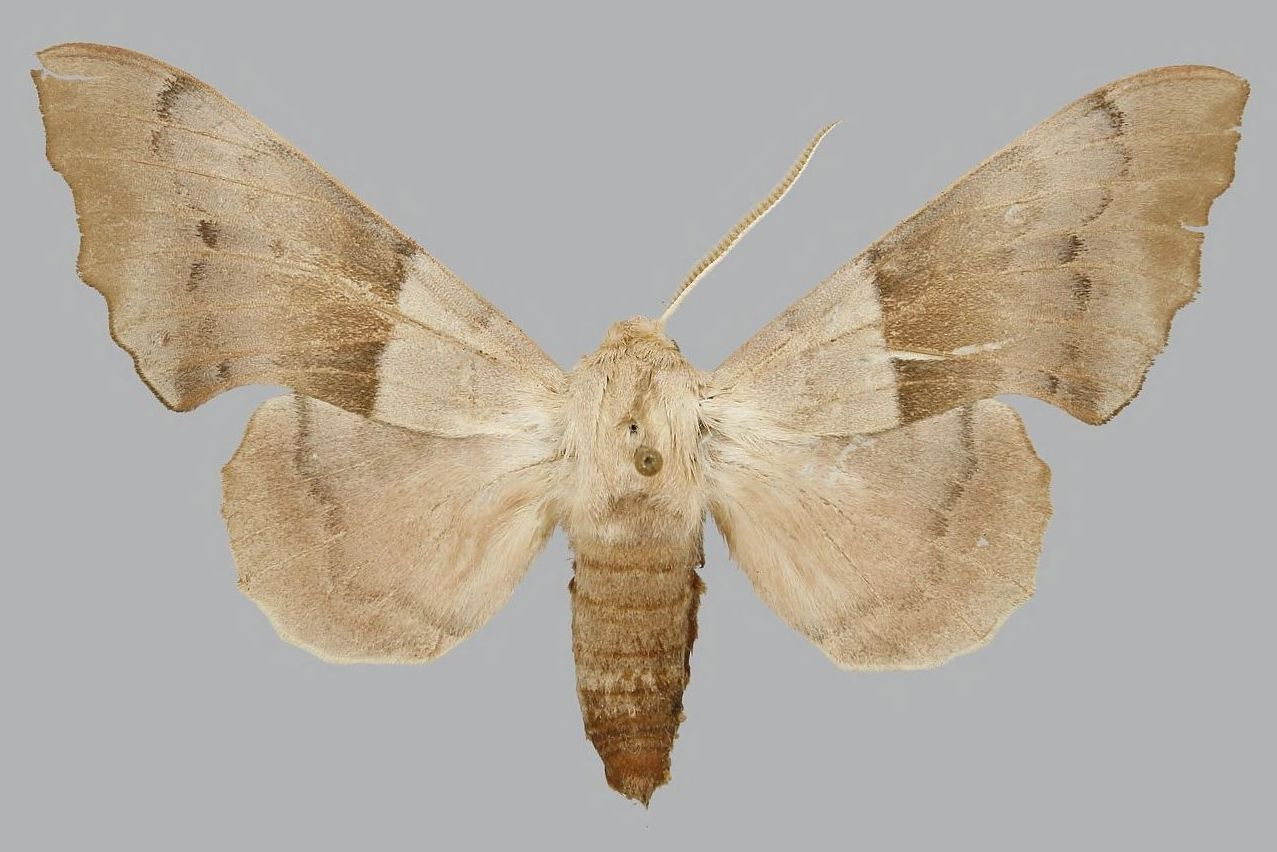

Scientific classification
- Domain: Eukaryota
- Kingdom: Animalia
- Phylum: Arthropoda
- Class: Insecta
- Order: Lepidoptera
- Family: Sphingidae
- Genus: Laothoe
- Species: L. philerema

Binomial name
- Laothoe philerema (Djakonov, 1923)

Synonyms
- Amorpha philerema Djakonov, 1923

= Laothoe philerema =

Pamir poplar hawkmoth

Species of moth

Laothoe philerema, the Pamir poplar hawkmoth, is a moth of the family Sphingidae. The species was first described by Alexander Michailovitsch Djakonov in 1923. It is known from eastern Turkmenistan, southern Uzbekistan, Tajikistan and eastern Afghanistan.

The wingspan is 80–120 mm. There are two or three generations per year, with adults on wing in late April and from late June to August.

The larvae feed on Populus species and have been recorded feeding on Populus pruinosa.

== Subspecies ==
- Laothoe philerema philerema
- Laothoe philerema witti Eitschberger, Danner & Surholt, 1998 (Afghanistan)
