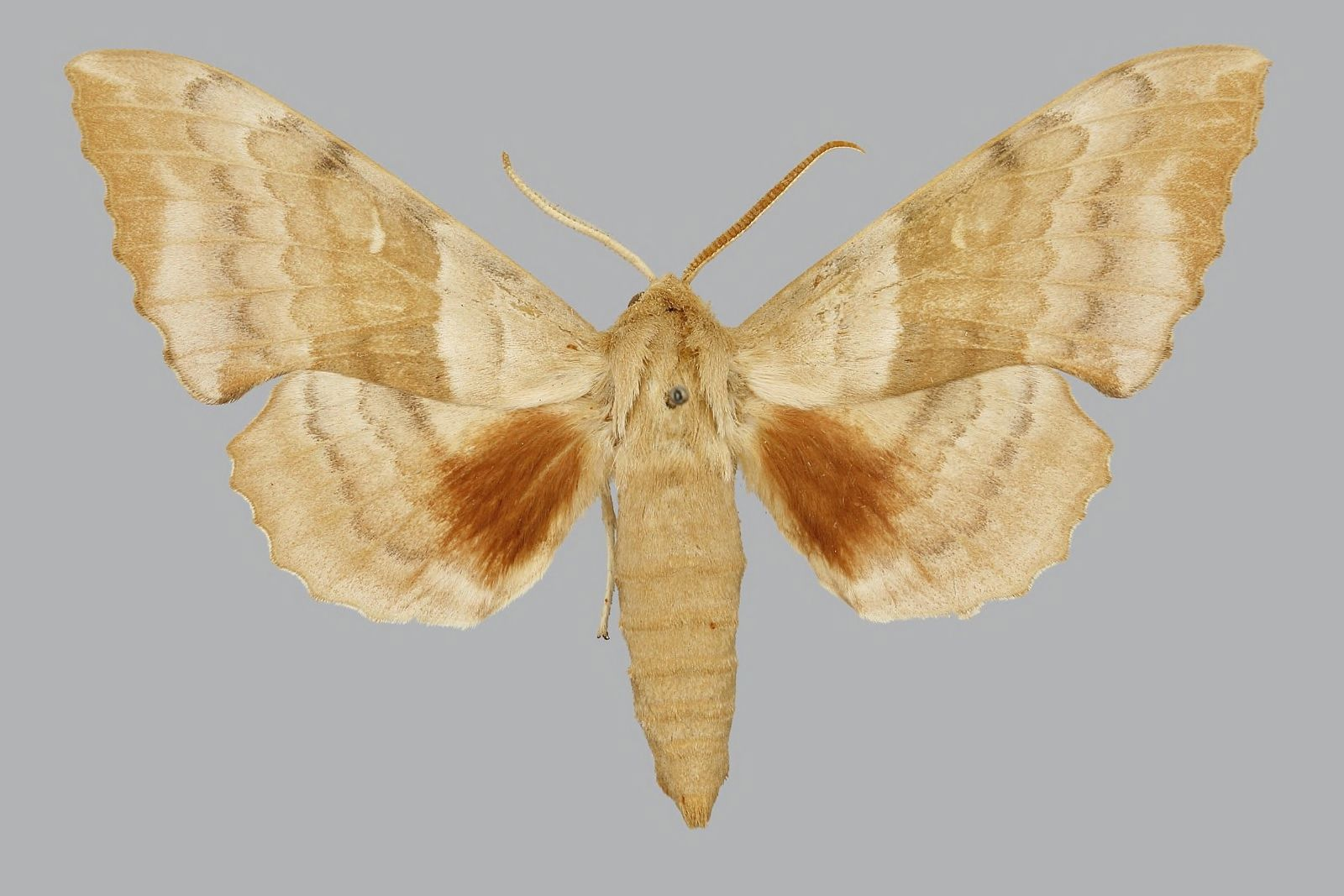
- Laothoe populeti male, Armenia

Scientific classification
- Domain: Eukaryota
- Kingdom: Animalia
- Phylum: Arthropoda
- Class: Insecta
- Order: Lepidoptera
- Family: Sphingidae
- Genus: Laothoe
- Species: L. populeti

Binomial name
- Laothoe populeti (Bienert, 1870)

Synonyms
- Smerinthus populeti Bienert, 1870; Laothoe populeti intermedia Gehlen, 1934; Laothoe populeti syriaca Gehlen, 1932

= Laothoe populeti =

Species of moth

Laothoe populeti is a species of moth of the family Sphingidae. It is found from eastern Turkey and Armenia, through north-eastern Iraq, the Iranian plateau and the central Asian republics of Turkmenistan, Uzbekistan, Tajikistan, Kyrgyzstan, Kazakhstan and north-western China.

The wingspan is 70–120 mm.

There are probably two generations per year. Adults have been recorded from April to May and again from July to August.

The larvae feed on Populus and Salix species.
