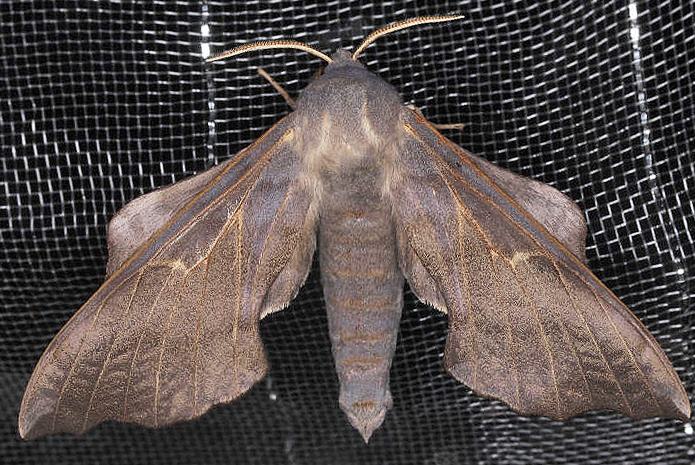

Scientific classification
- Domain: Eukaryota
- Kingdom: Animalia
- Phylum: Arthropoda
- Class: Insecta
- Order: Lepidoptera
- Family: Sphingidae
- Genus: Laothoe
- Species: L. amurensis

Binomial name
- Laothoe amurensis (Staudinger, 1892)

Synonyms
- Sphinx tremulae Boisduval, 1828; Laothoe tremulae baltica Viidalepp, 1979; Smerinthus amurensis rosacea Staudinger, 1892

= Laothoe amurensis =

Aspen hawk-moth

Species of moth

Laothoe amurensis, the aspen hawk-moth, is a moth of the family Sphingidae.

== Distribution ==
It is found in the northern part of the Palearctic realm. It flies in May and can be found only in far-eastern Europe, including parts of Poland, Finland, Ukraine and Belarus. It is found East to Japan as subspecies sinica. In spite of being very rare, it is not protected, e.g. in Poland. There are few known places where obtaining this moth by attracting to light is possible.

== Description ==
The wingspan is 71–98 mm. Very similar to Laothoe populi, a common European moth found everywhere, but bigger and much darker.

Eggs laid singly or in small groups of two to four. Eggs are laid on the underside of leaves.

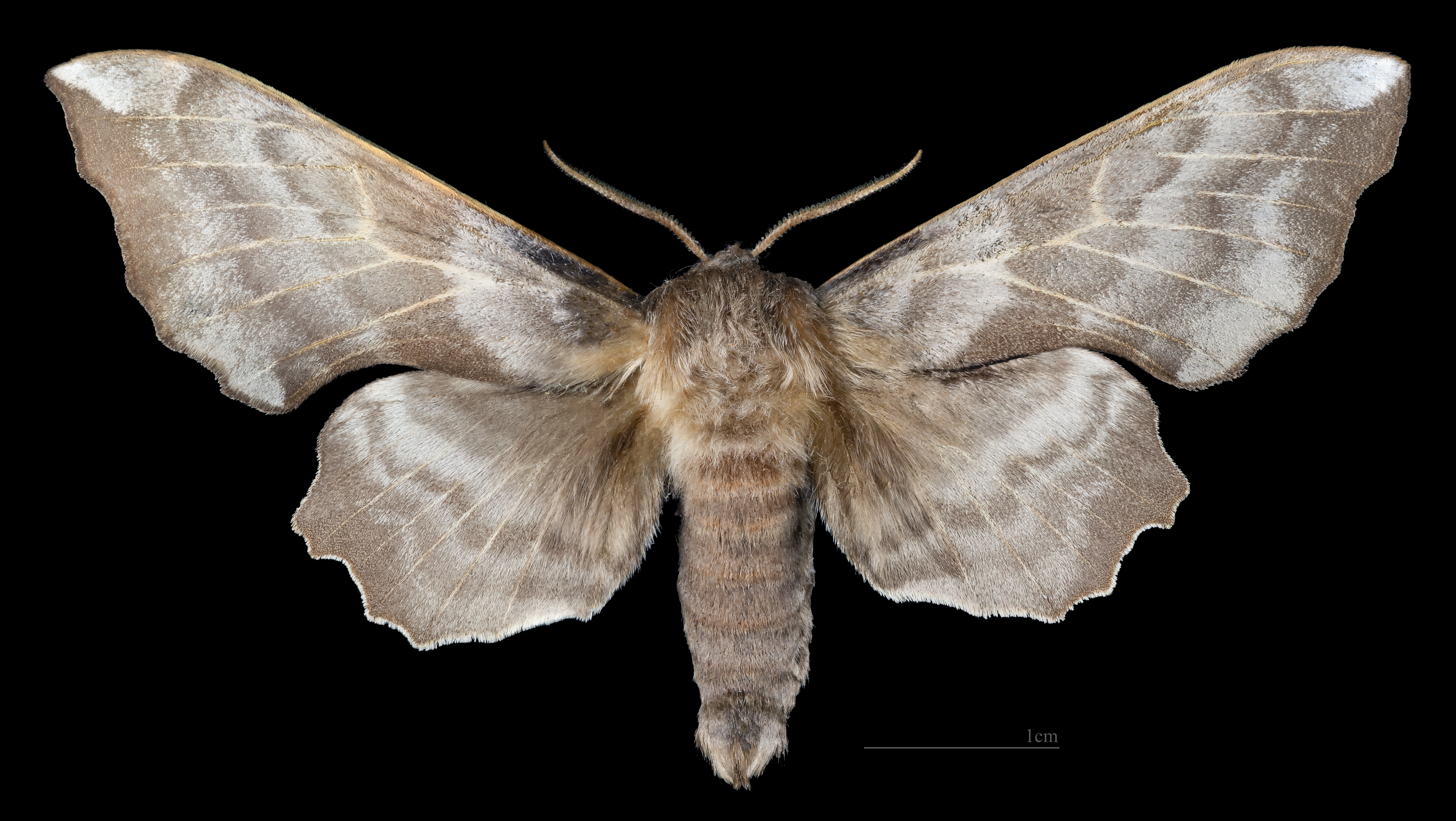
Male dorsal

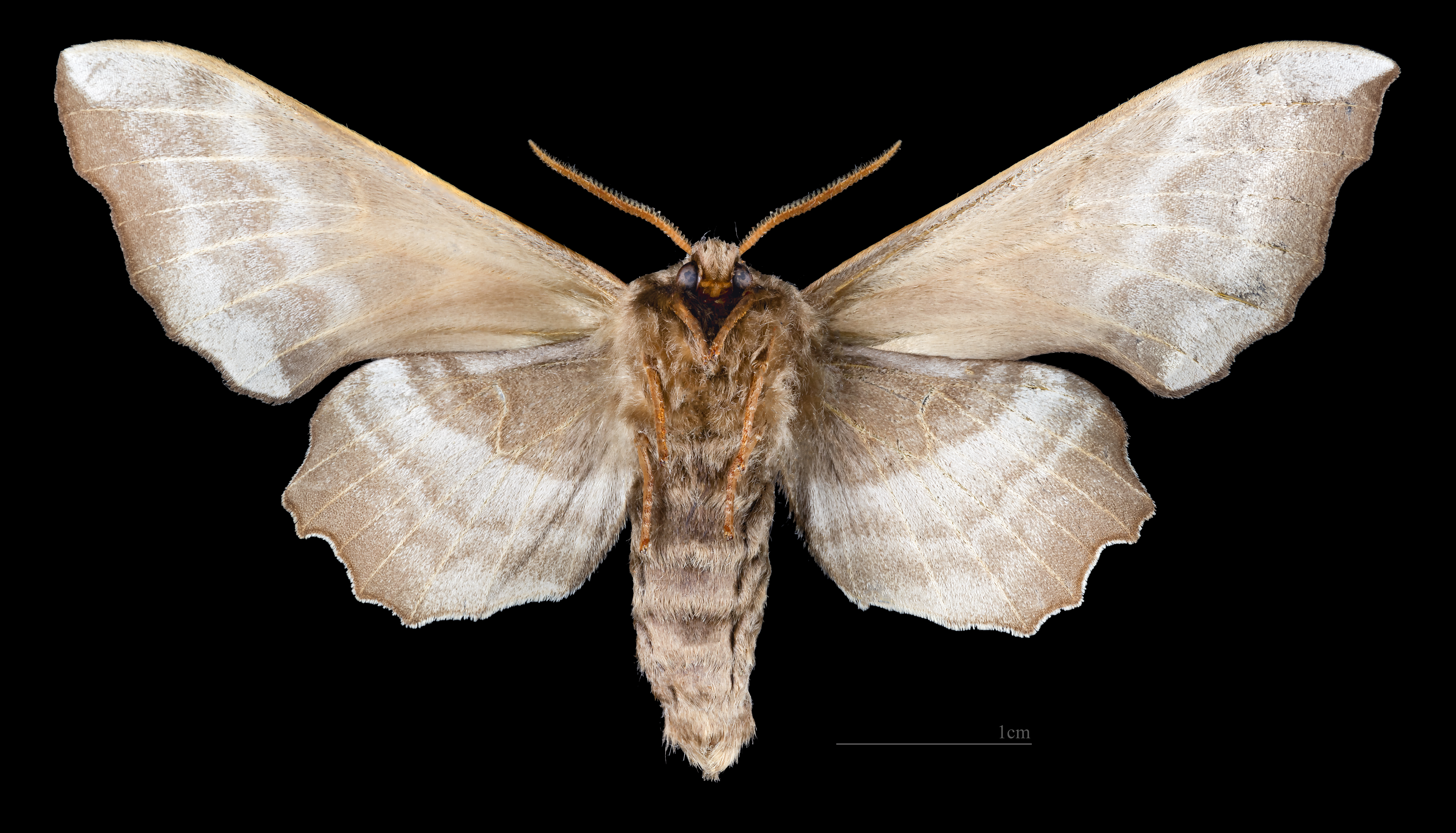
Male ventral

== Biology ==
The larvae feed singly on Populus tremula and willow. They are green with seven pale stripes, and look like L. populi caterpillars, but, opposite to it, have two or three little "horns" above their head. It is difficult to distinguish.

This moth spends winter as chrysalid in the soil.

== Subspecies ==
- Laothoe amurensis amurensis (from central Poland and southern Finland, east through Russia, southern Siberia and Yakutia to the Pacific coast, including Sakhalin Island. In the eastern Palaearctic, it occurs south as far as the Altai Mountains of Xinjiang, northern Mongolia, northern Heilongjiang, Primorskiy Kray and Hokkaido and Honshu in Japan)
- Laothoe amurensis sinica Rothschild & Jordan, 1903 (China and Korea)
