= Boyd Avenue Historic District =

Historic district in West Virginia, United States

- U.S. National Register of Historic Places
- U.S. Historic district
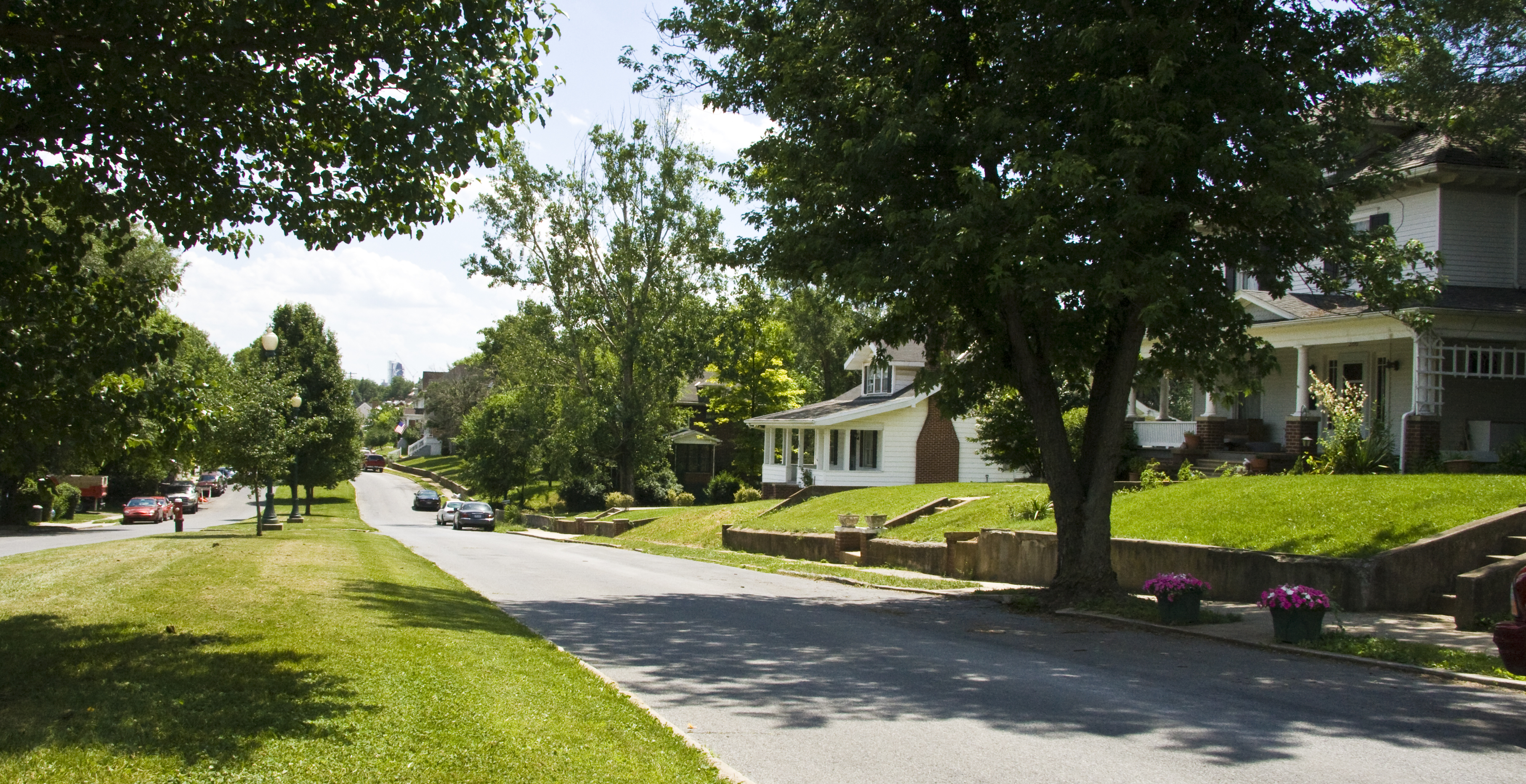

- Location within West Virginia Location within the United States
- Location: Boyd Ave., E and W sides, N of Queen St., Martinsburg, West Virginia
- Coordinates: 39.46284°N 77.96511°W
- Built: 1750
- Architectural style: Italianate, Colonial Revival
- NRHP reference No.: 07000781
- Added to NRHP: August 3, 2007

The Boyd Avenue Historic District is a residential district comprising 80 houses in Martinsburg, West Virginia. The district includes the circa 1776 Aspen Hall and the associated Mendenhall's Fort of circa 1756. The district extends along Boyd Avenue 1,500 feet (460 m) from West Race Street to Aspen Hall. The older section of the street is a single 40-foot (12 m) right-of-way, while the newer portion is boulevarded, with a grassed median between two separate roads. The older section is significant from about 1888 to 1914, while the newer portion is significant from 1914 to the 1950s.

Houses reflect a variety of styles, ranging from Italianate and Colonial Revival through Bungalow and 1950s ranch and Cape Cod styles. A mixture of wood and masonry construction is present, typically two stories high. Lots are typically narrow and deep. House forms, independent of style, range from the I-house in older sections to American Foursquare, to 1½ story Cape Cod and 1 story ranch houses.

The district was listed on the National Register of Historic Places in 2007.
