= Aspen Hill (Charles Town, West Virginia) =

Historic house in West Virginia, United States

- U.S. National Register of Historic Places
- Location within West Virginia Location within the United States
- Nearest city: Charles Town, West Virginia
- Coordinates: 39°19′18″N 77°51′44″W
- Built: 1840
- Architectural style: Greek Revival
- NRHP reference No.: 80004024
- Added to NRHP: March 13, 1980

Aspen Hill is a farmhouse, built about 1840 near Charles Town, Virginia (now in West Virginia), by James G. Hurst, a middle-tier farmer and landowner, who sought to build a residence befitting his rising status. The house occupies a middle ground between the grand mansions of the landed gentry and the more humble dwellings of more modest farmers. The house lacks some of the details and craftsmanship present in more substantial houses.
