= Aspen (Botkyrka Municipality) =

Lake in Botkyrka municipality, Sweden

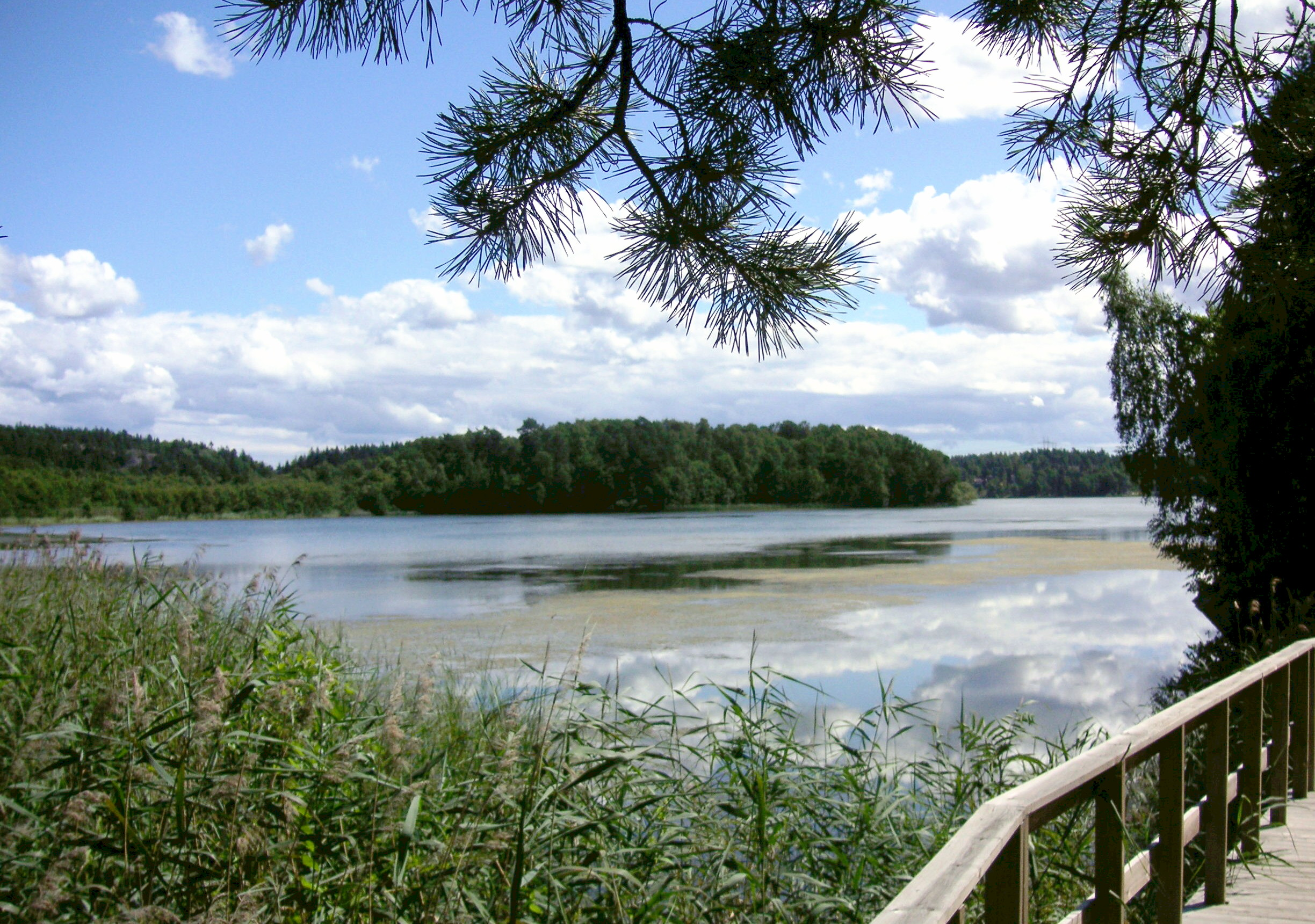

- Location within Stockholm Location within Sweden
- Coordinates: 59°13′18″N 17°48′33″E
- Catchment area: 7.97 km^{2} (3.08 sq mi)
- Basin countries: Sweden
- Max. length: 3.5 km (2.2 mi)
- Max. width: 950 m (3,120 ft)
- Surface area: 1 km^{2} (0.39 sq mi)
- Max. depth: 3.5 m (11 ft)
- Shore length^{1}: 11.95 km (7.43 mi)
- Surface elevation: 18 m (59 ft)
- ^{1} Shore length is not a well-defined measure.

Aspen is a lake in Botkyrka Municipality, Stockholm County, Sweden. The lake is crossed by the European route E4/European route E20 and is located about 20 kilometres southwest of Stockholm, the Swedish capital. It has an area of 1 km^{2}.

During the Stone Age, Aspen was in the ocean, but was uplifted by the time of the Bronze Age. Bronze Age settlements grew up around the lake and for some thousand years Iron Age farms were around the lake. The area developed during this period. A graveyard from that period is preserved in the area.

Skrävsta Ekholmen nature reserve is in the vicinity of the lake with about sixty large oak trees, half of which are centuries old. There are large bats and many other rare animal and plant species. Around the lake is a nature trail at 7½ km length. The path leads through the woods, high above the marsh.

== Gallery ==
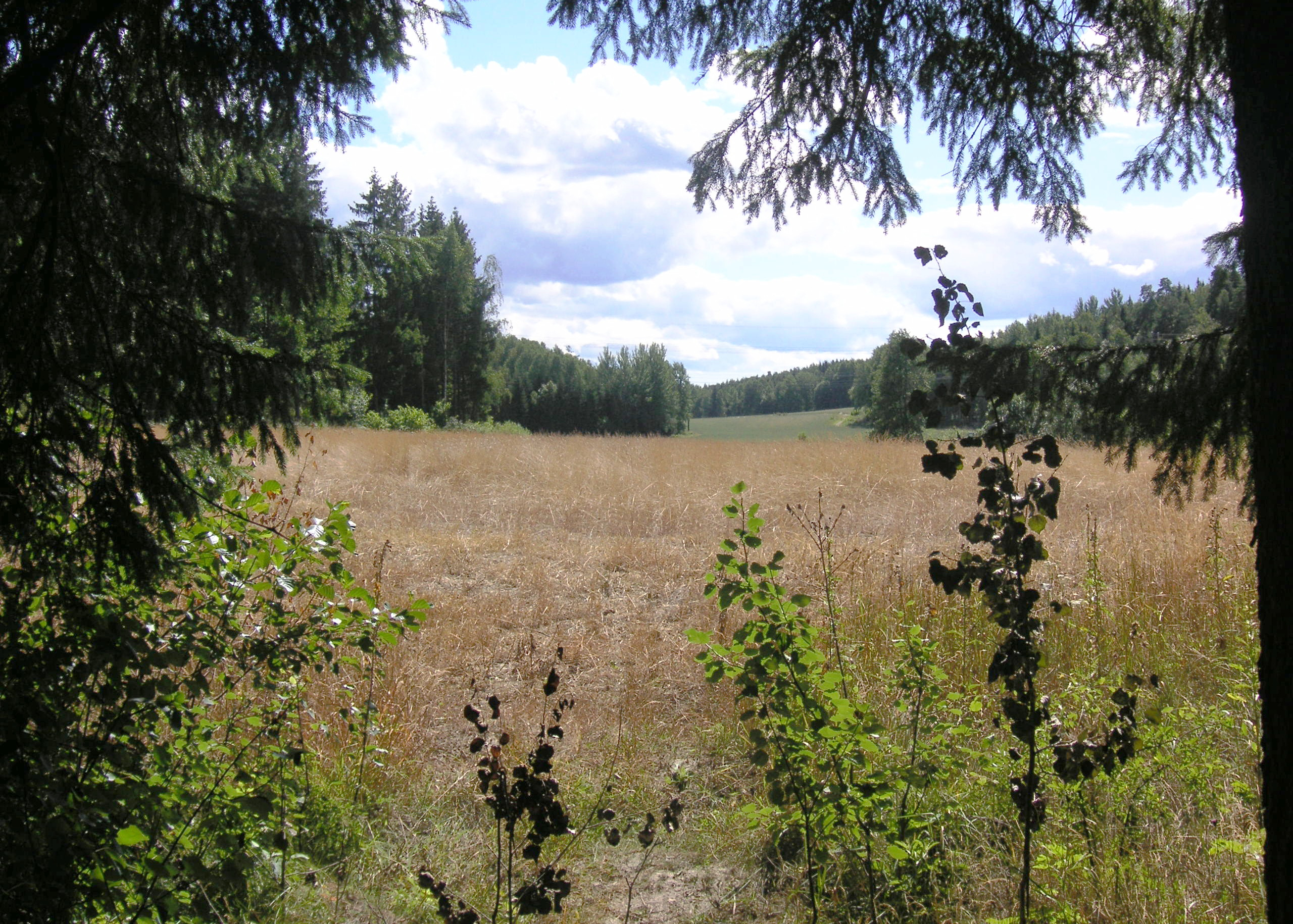
Lake Aspen, cultural landscape

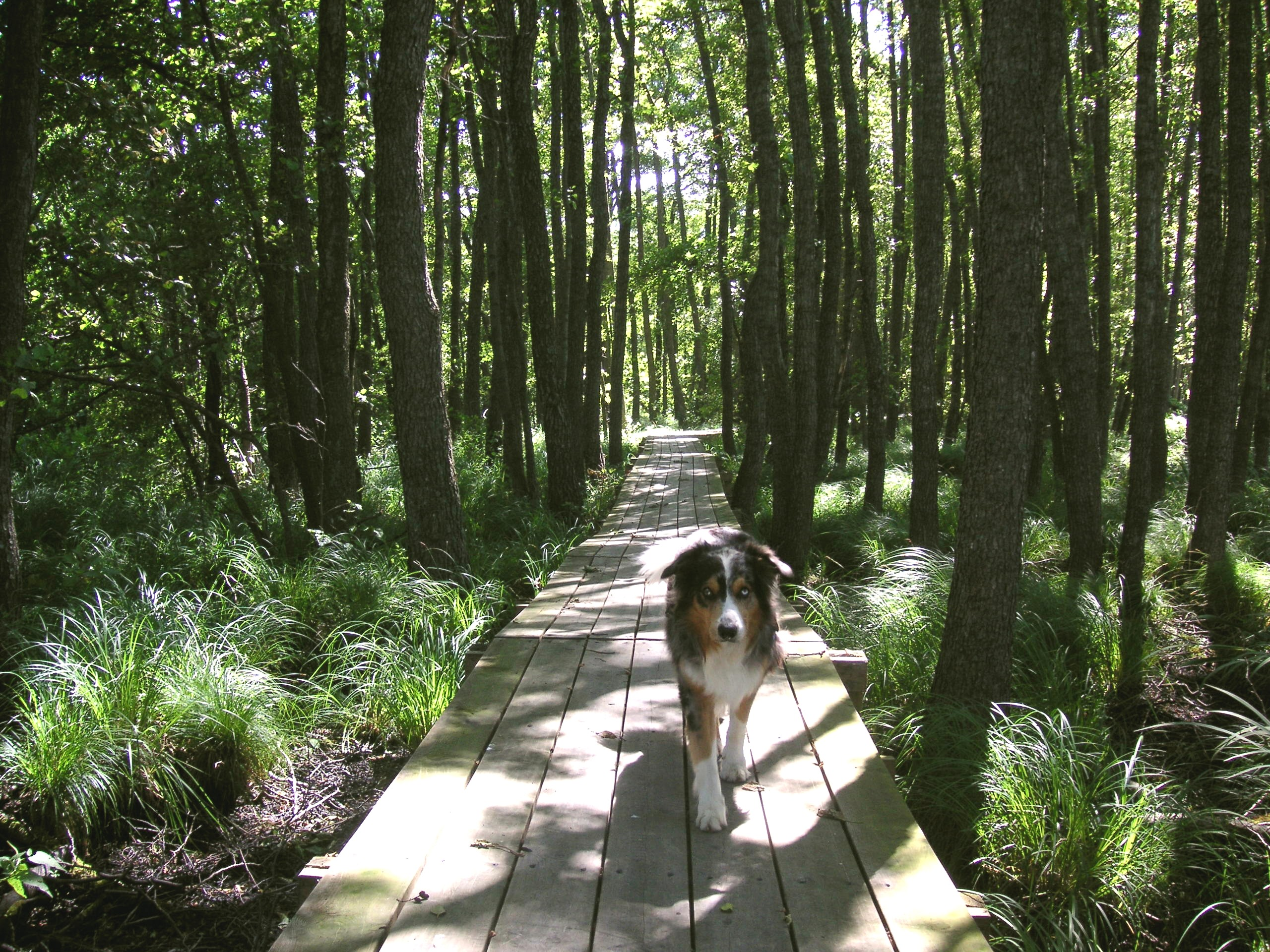
Lake Aspen, nature path

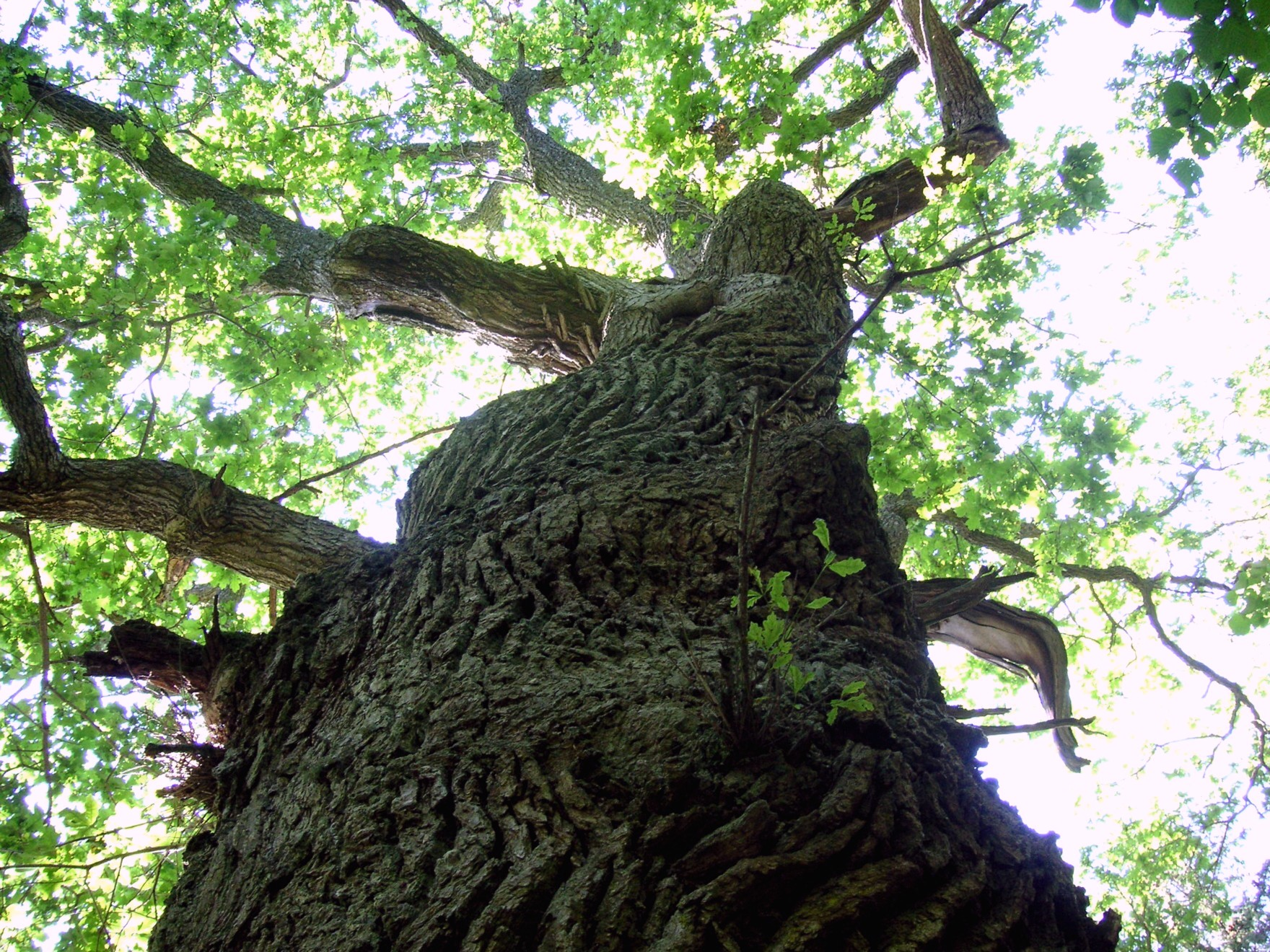
Lake Aspen, old oaks

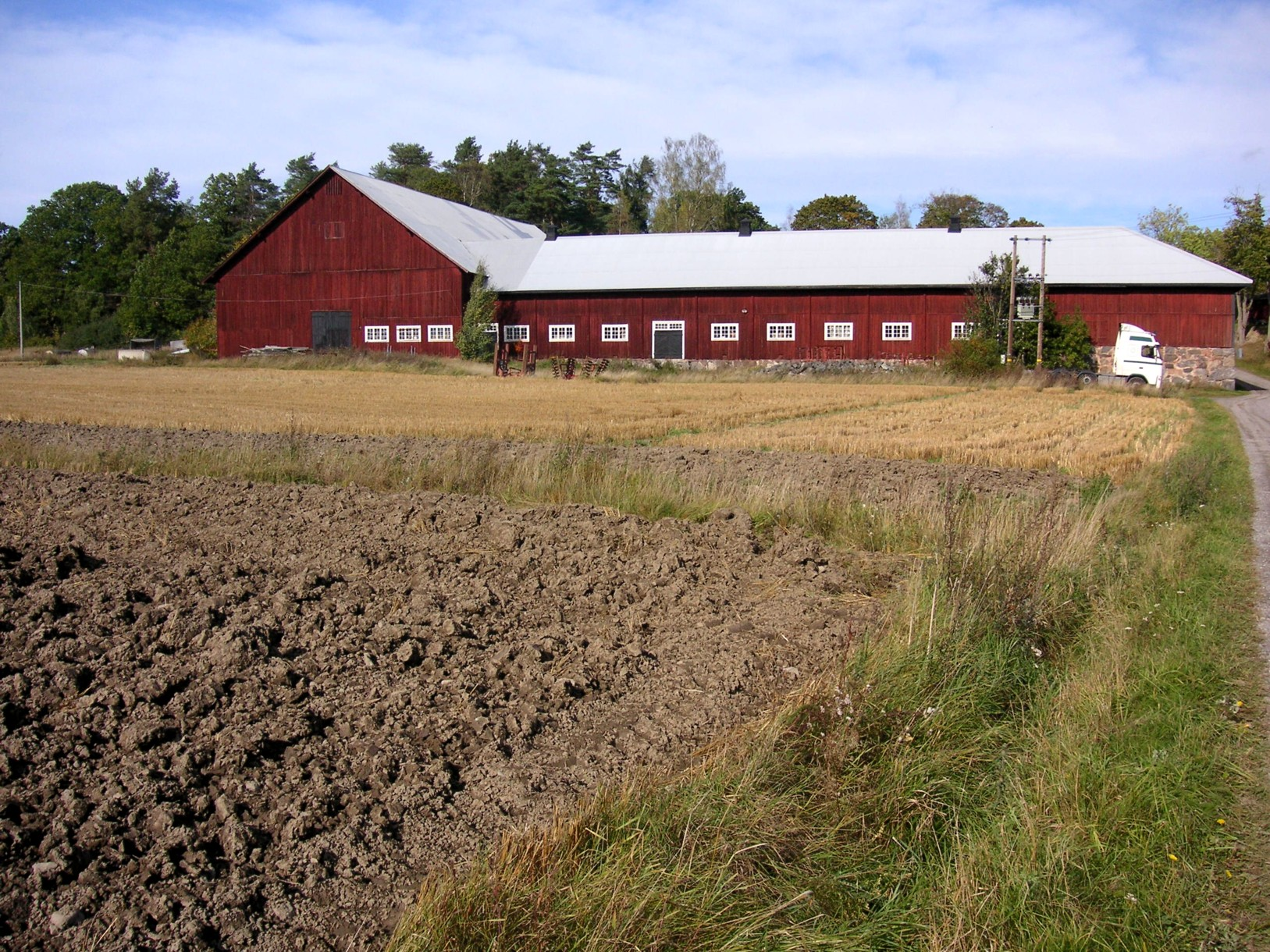
Lake Aspen, Lind Hov farm
