= Aspin valve =

An Aspin valve consists of a cone-shaped metal part fitted to the cylinder head in an internal combustion engine. Aspin valves were first patented by Frank Metcalf Aspin in 1939, although the idea was devised before this time.

The valve rotates to provide the opening and closing necessary for intake and exhaust. It is attached to the engine, vertical to the cylinder block, via a shaft at its top; this allows the valve to rotate horizontally above the cylinder and when it turns. The valve is hollow, and has a large cut-out opening in one side. This alternately allows gases into the combustion chamber, and out to the exhaust system by lining up holes in the valve shaft with the cylinder-head ports which allows the gases to pass.
