= Aspen Hall (Martinsburg, West Virginia) =

Historic house in West Virginia, United States

- U.S. National Register of Historic Places
- U.S. Historic district – Contributing property
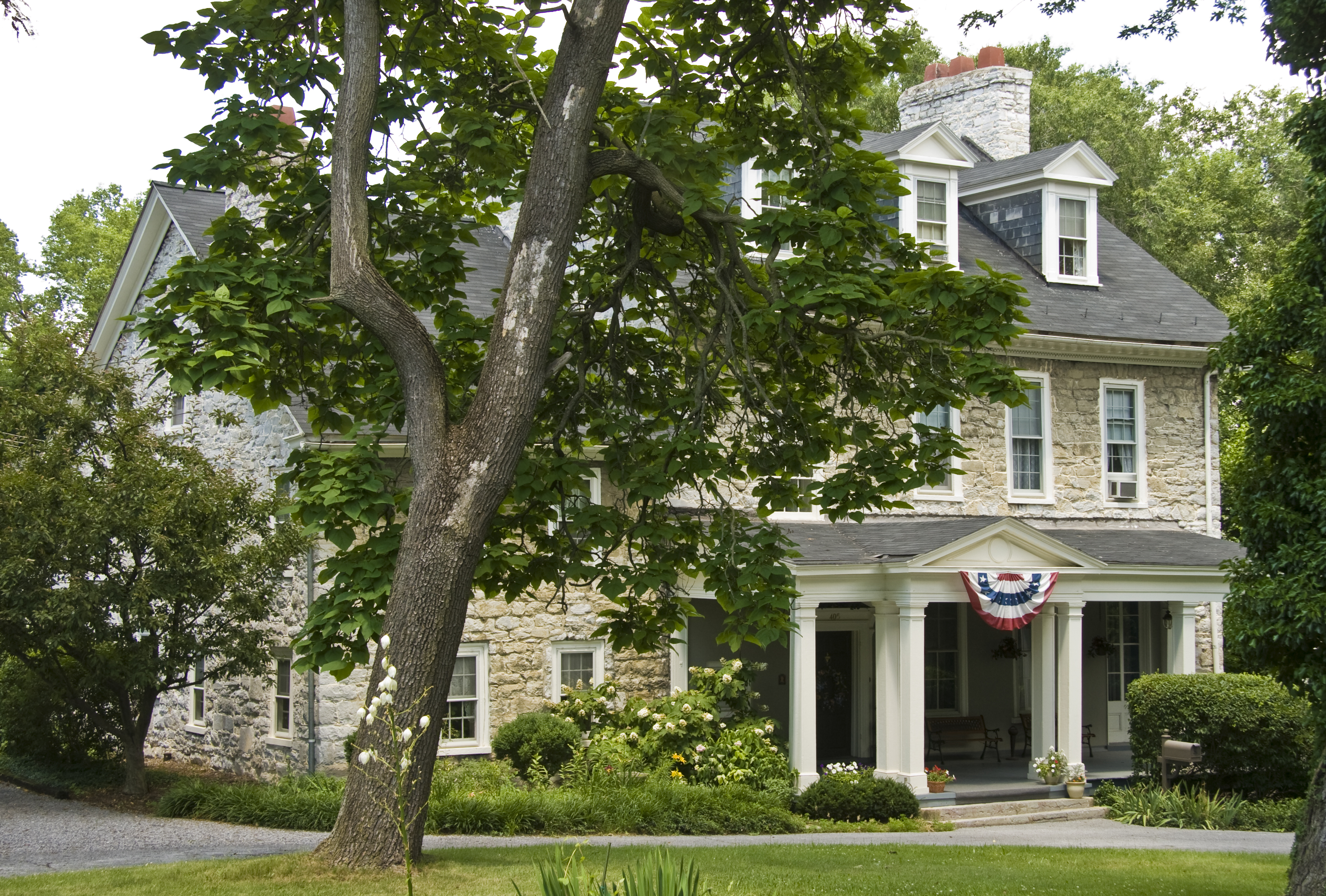

- Location within West Virginia Location within the United States
- Location: End of Boyd Ave., Martinsburg, West Virginia
- Coordinates: 39.4651°N 77.9638°W
- MPS: Berkeley County MRA
- NRHP reference No.: 80004882
- Added to NRHP: December 10, 1980

Aspen Hall, also known as the Edward Beeson House, was built beginning in 1771 as a stone house in the Georgian style in what would become Martinsburg, West Virginia. The first portion of the house was a 20 by 20 foot "fortified stone home", 2½ stories tall., in coursed rubble limestone built in 1745 by Edward Beeson I. It is the oldest house in Martinsburg.

The Georgian block of the house was built by Edward Beeson II, a wealthy Quaker farmer and miller. Beeson died in 1817 and the house was sold to Mathew Ranson of Jefferson County in 1821, who then sold it to Union Colonel John W. Stewart in 1850. The house remained in the Stewart family until 1926.

Aspen Hall is notable for its outstanding entrance hall, measuring 13 feet (4.0 m) wide and 36 feet (11 m) deep. The original interior was laid out in a side hall arrangement, two rooms deep. The principal interior rooms are paneled. About 1900 the house was altered to make what had been the rear entrance the front, and Victorian details were added.

The property includes the blockhouse of Mendenhall's Fort, built about 1755 by John Mendenhall, brother of Edward Beeson I's widow. There was a wooden stockade that extended from the blockhouse to surround Mendenhall's and Beeson's homes. Mendenhall's home was also built in 1755, making it the second oldest house in Martinsburg. The fort was built to defend the area against Native American attack during the French and Indian War. The fortification was noted by George Washington in a communication to Colonel William Fairfax in 1757. Col. Washington garrisoned troops at Mendenhall's several times. House of Burgesses candidate Washington attended a wedding at "Mendenhall's Mill" in 1761.

The property was placed on the National Register of Historic Places in 1980, and is included in the Boyd Avenue Historic District.
