= Aspen Brook (Colorado) =

Physical characteristics
- Source
  - coordinates: 40°17′56″N 105°32′35″W
- Mouth
  - location: Confluence with Big Thompson
  - coordinates: 40°20′56″N 105°34′07″W
  - elevation: 7,779 ft (2,371 m)

Basin features
- Progression: Big Thompson— South Platte—Platte— Missouri—Mississippi

The Aspen Brook is a 3.9-mile-long (6.3 km) tributary of the Big Thompson River in Larimer County, Colorado. The stream's source is near Wind River Pass. It flows north to a confluence with the Big Thompson in Rocky Mountain National Park.

== See also ==
- List of rivers of Colorado
