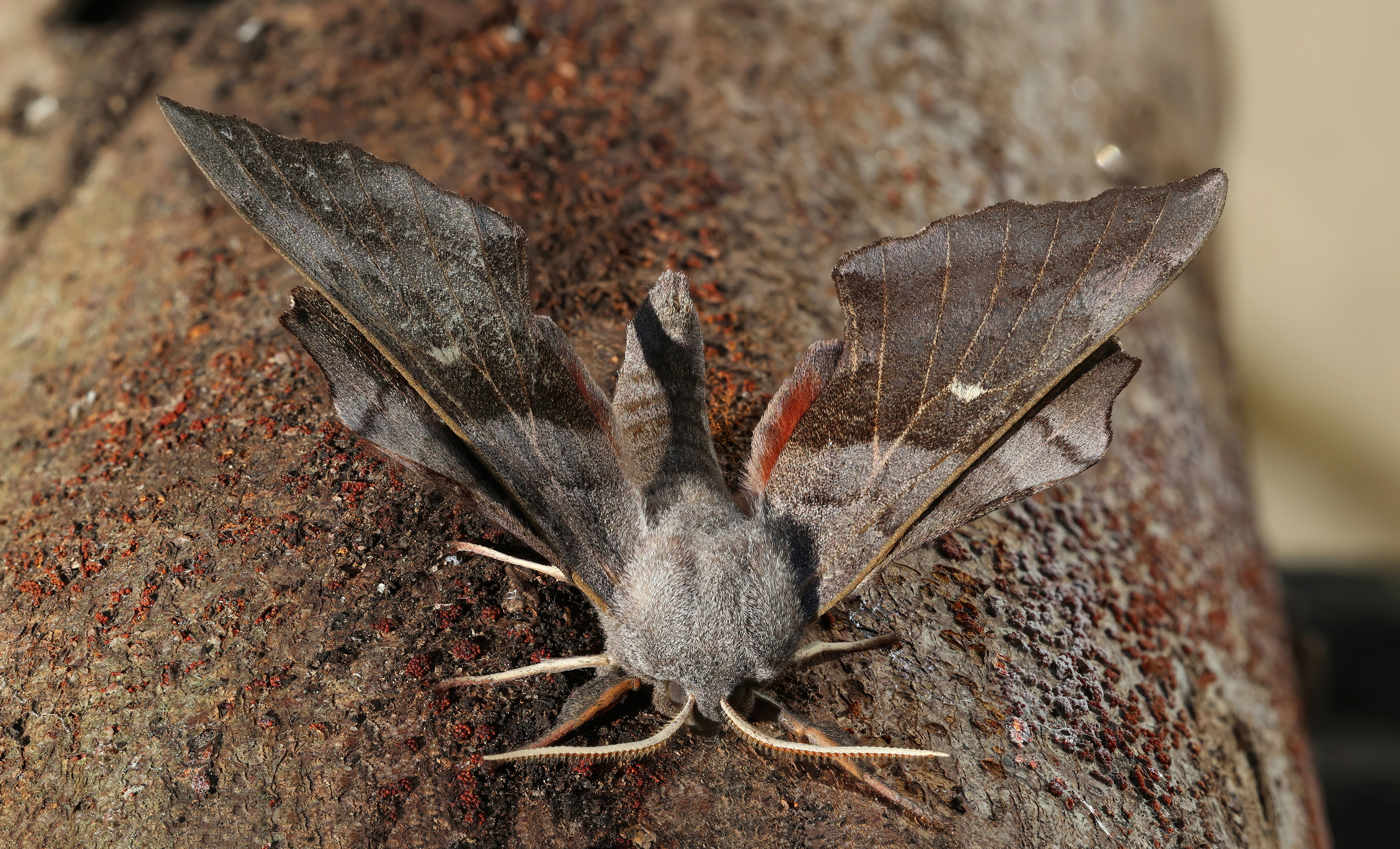
- In Oxfordshire, England

Scientific classification
- Kingdom: Animalia
- Phylum: Arthropoda
- Clade: Pancrustacea
- Class: Insecta
- Order: Lepidoptera
- Family: Sphingidae
- Genus: Laothoe
- Species: L. populi

Binomial name
- Laothoe populi (Linnaeus, 1758)

Synonyms
- List: Sphinx populi Linnaeus, 1758; Sphinx tremulae Borkhausen, 1793; Merinthus palustris Holle, 1865; Smerinthus borkhauseni Bartel, 1900; Smerinthus roseotincta Reuter, 1893; Amorpha populi angustata (Closs, 1916); Amorpha populi depupillatus (Silbernagel, 1943); Amorpha populi flavomaculata Mezger, 1928; Amorpha populi lappona Rangnow, 1935; Amorpha populi pallida Tutt, 1902; Amorpha populi philiponi Huard, 1928; Amorpha populi suffusa Tutt, 1902; Laothoe populi albida Cockayne, 1953; Laothoe populi basilutescens Cockayne, 1953; Laothoe populi bicolor (Lempke, 1959); Laothoe populi minor (Vilarrubia, 1973); Laothoe populi moesta Cockayne, 1953; Laothoe populi pallida Newnham, 1900; Merinthus populi salicis Holle, 1865; Smerinthus populi cinerea-diluta Gillmer, 1904; Smerinthus populi decorata Schultz, 1903; Smerinthus populi ferruginea-fasciata Gillmer, 1904; Smerinthus populi ferruginea Gillmer, 1904; Smerinthus populi fuchsi Bartel, 1900; Smerinthus populi grisea-diluta Gillmer, 1904; Smerinthus populi grisea Gillmer, 1904; Smerinthus populi pallida-fasciata Gillmer, 1904; Smerinthus populi rectilineata Klemensiewicz, 1912; Smerinthus populi rufa-diluta Gillmer, 1904; Smerinthus populi rufa Gillmer, 1904; Smerinthus populi rufescens (de Selys-Longschamps, 1857); Smerinthus populi rufescens Fuchs, 1889; Smerinthus populi subflava Gillmer, 1904; Smerinthus populi violacea Newnham, 1900

= Poplar hawkmoth =

Species of moth

The poplar hawkmoth (Laothoe populi) is a moth of the family Sphingidae. The species was first described by Carl Linnaeus in his 1758 10th edition of Systema Naturae. It is found throughout the Palearctic region and the Near East and is one of the most common members of the family in the region. It is distinctive due to its habit of resting with its hindwings held further forward than (but still half hidden by) the forewings.

Adults may be seen from May to September, and do not feed, not having a functional proboscis, and can vary in colour from grey to yellow. The larva is green, feeds on poplar and some other tree species, and pupates below ground.

== Description ==
The poplar hawkmoth is a large (wingspan 70–100 mm (2.8–3.9 in)), odd-looking species of moth, due to its habit of resting with its hindwings held further forward than (but still half hidden by) the forewings. The species lacks a frenulum joining the wings together, and is said to look like a cluster of dead leaves of the main host, poplar.

When disturbed, the moth will suddenly reveal a bright orange-red basal patch on the hindwing, possibly as a distraction or startle display. The wings are grey marked with darker grey fascia but with the greys occasionally replaced by buffish tones, a form more frequent among females than males. There is a white spot at the distal edge of the cell on the forewings.

Gynandromorphs, half female and half male, are common.

Poplar hawkmoths have been known to produce a hybrid when mated with the eyed hawkmoth, Smerinthus ocellatus; the hybrid has eyes on the hindwings.

== Life cycle ==
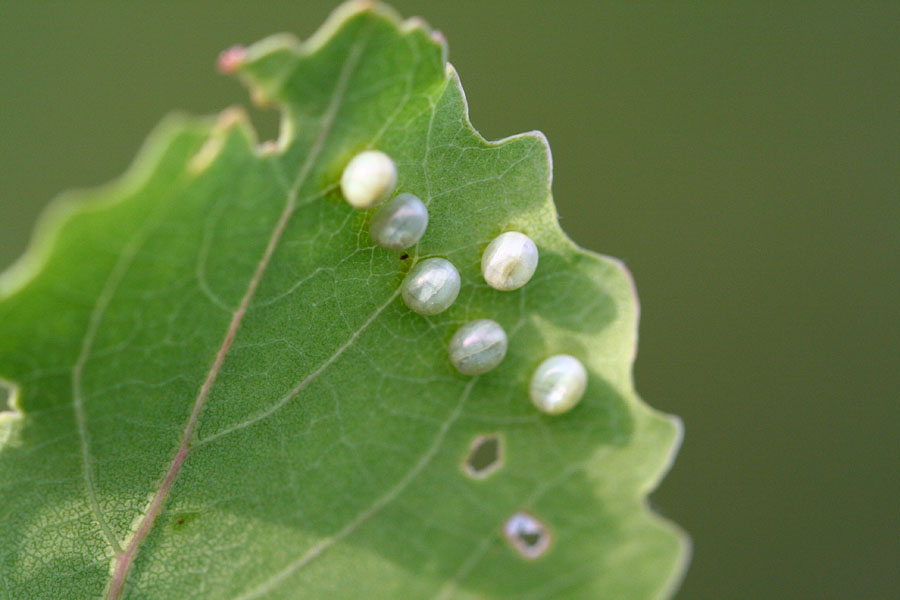
Eggs

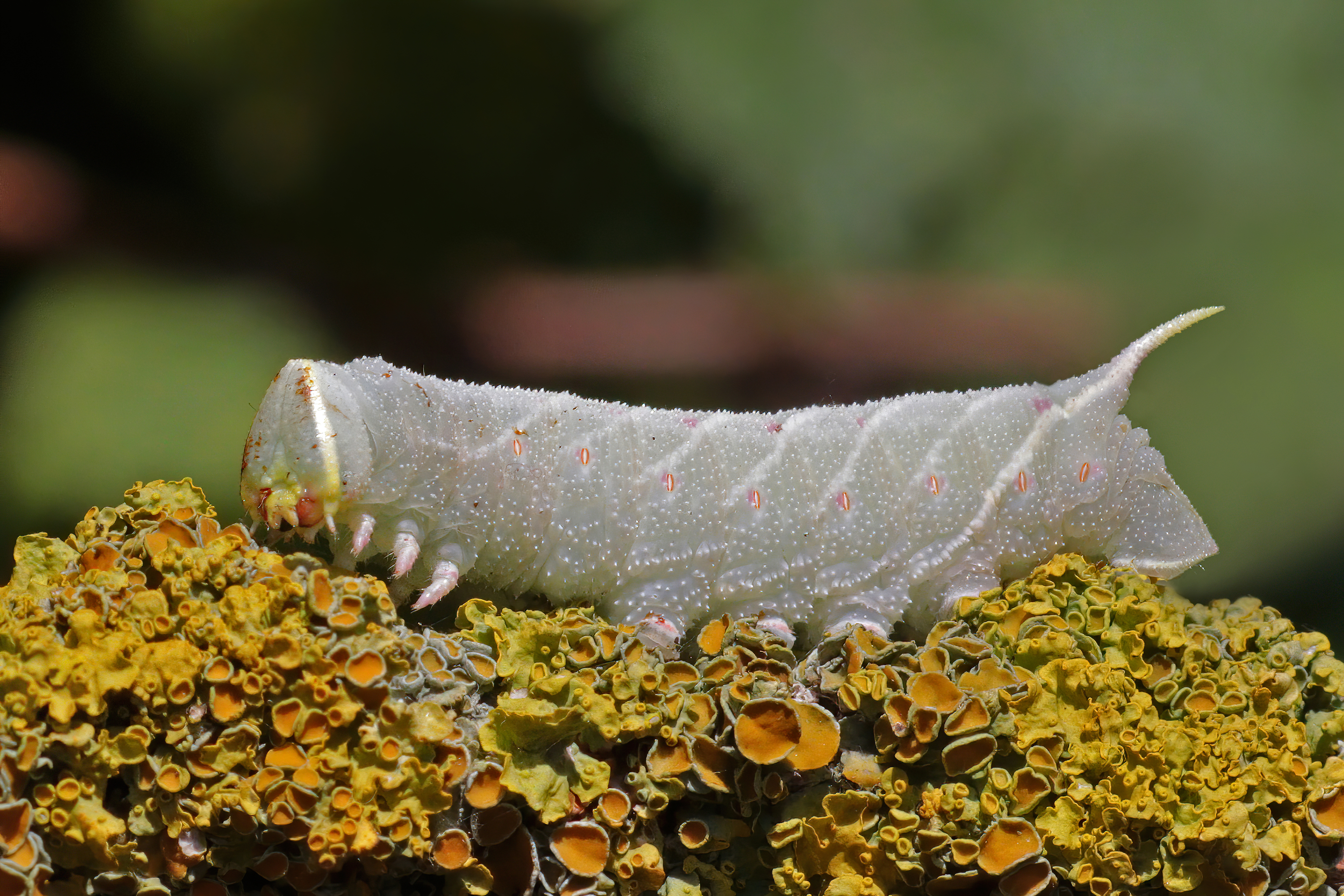
Late instar larva

One or two broods are produced each year and adults can be seen from May to August. The moth lays eggs which are large, spherical, pale green, and glossy. These are laid singly or in pairs on the underside of leaves of the host plant. Females lay around 50 to 200 eggs. On first hatching the larva (or "hornworm") is pale green with small yellow tubercles and a cream-coloured tail horn. Later, it develops yellow diagonal stripes on its sides, and pink spiracles. Individuals feeding on willows may become quite heavily spotted with red. Others are more bluish white with cream stripes and tubercules. They are stout bodied, and grow to 65–85 mm (2.6–3.3 in). The larva has a diet of tree leaves such as poplar, willow and aspen.

The species overwinters as a pupa, the larva pupating in an earthen cell 2–3 cm (0.79–1.18 in) below the surface, near its host plant. It has a short cremaster. The poplar hawkmoth lives for a few weeks as an adult, during which it does not feed, instead relying on fat built up during the larval stage. Although they emerge late at night or early in the morning, the moth flies starting from the second night and is strongly attracted to light.

== Host plants ==
The poplar hawkmoth feeds mainly on poplar and aspen, but sometimes on willow, alder, apple, tomato, birch, elm, oak and ash. The food source used by the moth often depends on location.

== Subspecies ==
- Laothoe populi populi
- Laothoe populi lappona (Rangnow, 1935)

== Gallery ==
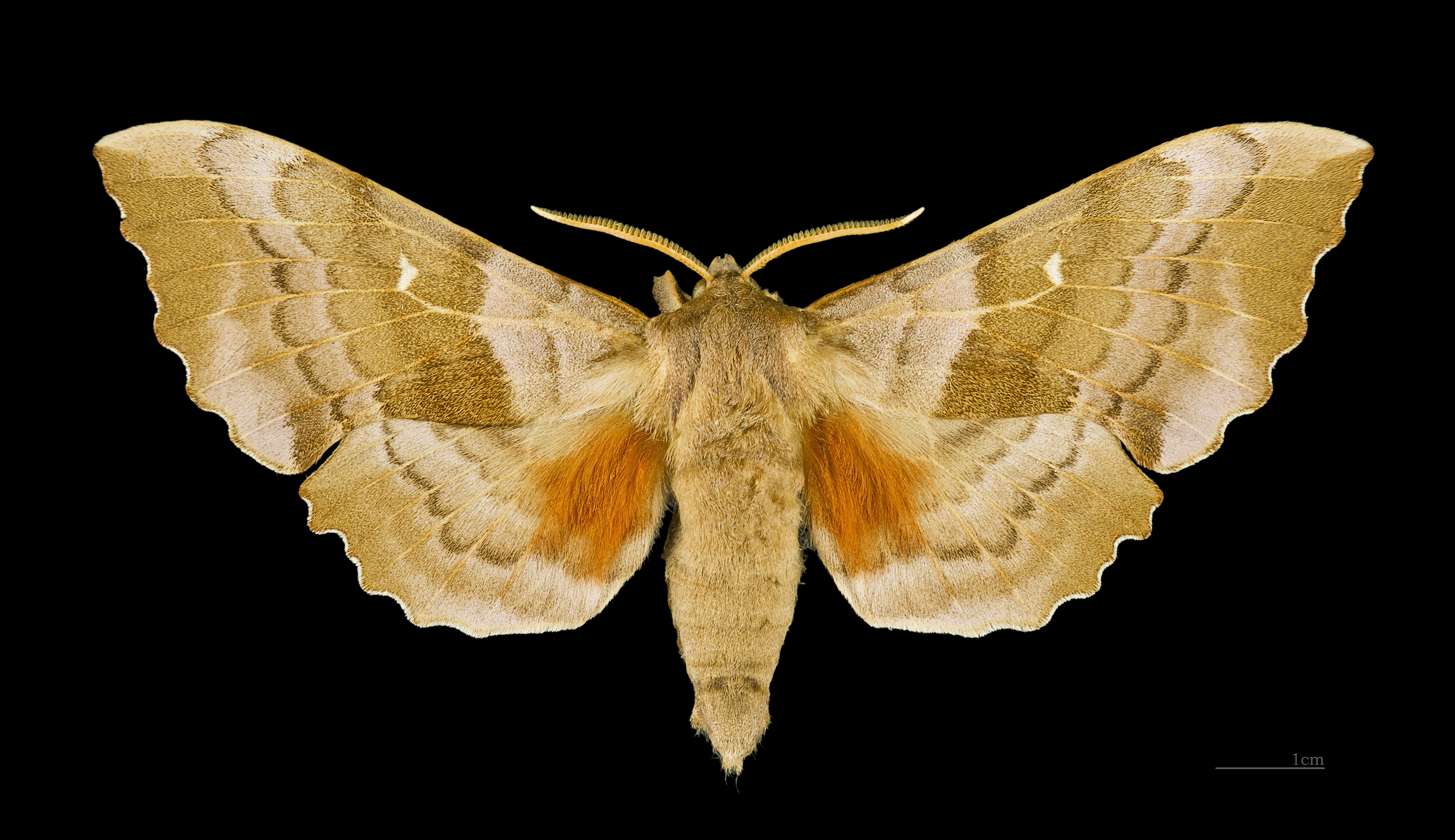
A male poplar hawkmoth, viewed from the back

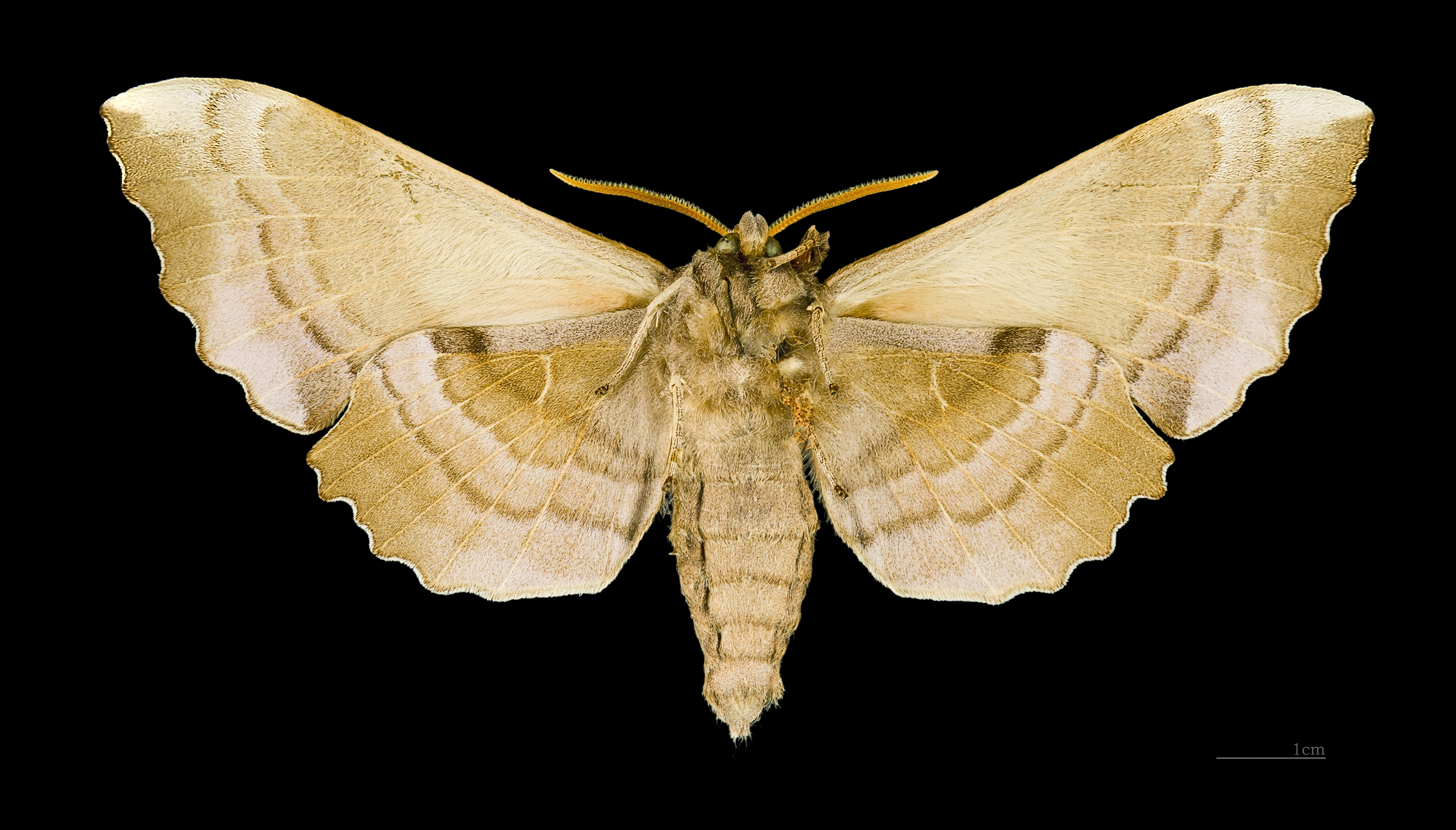
A male poplar hawkmoth, viewed from the front

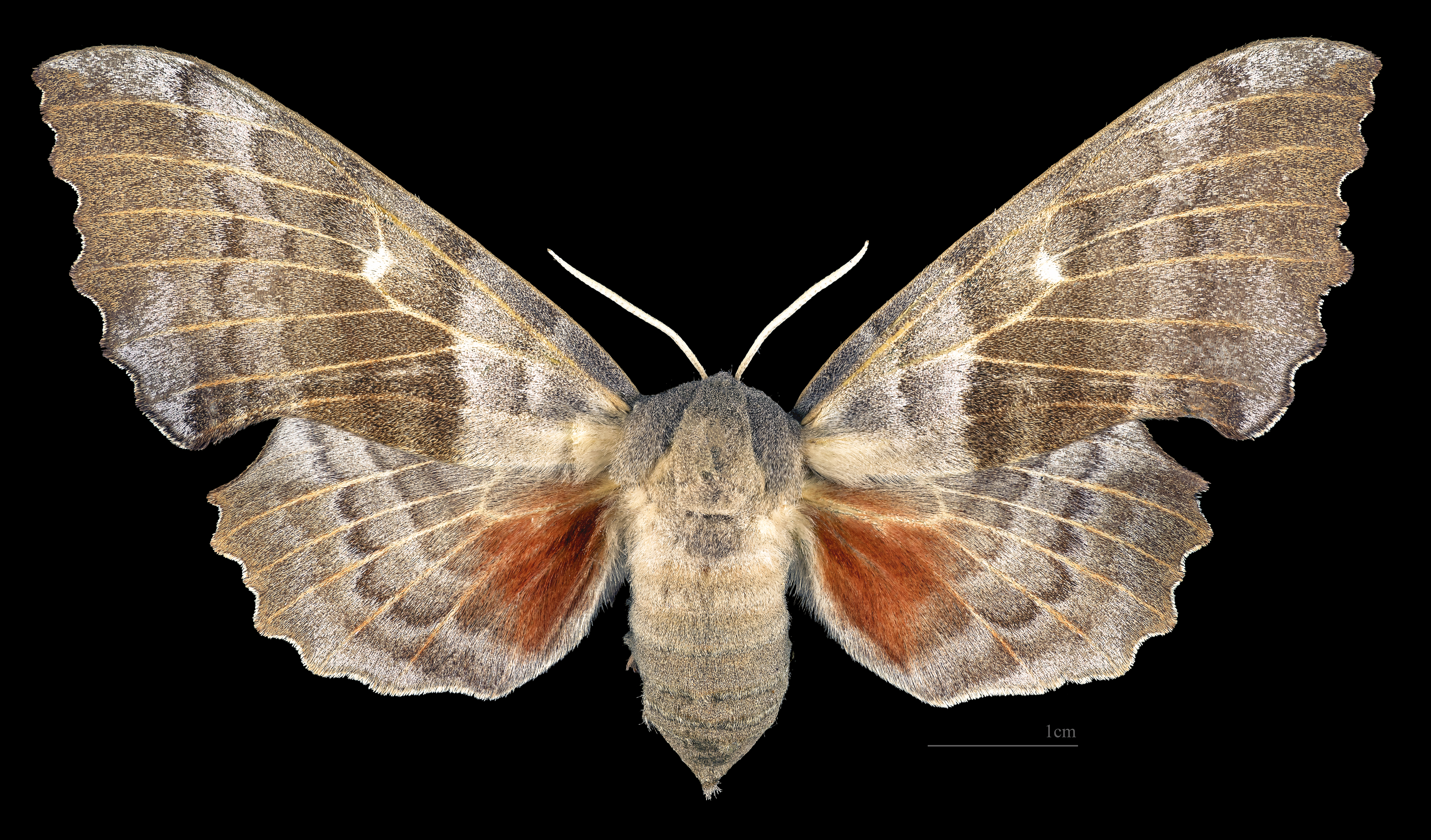
A female poplar hawkmoth, viewed from the back

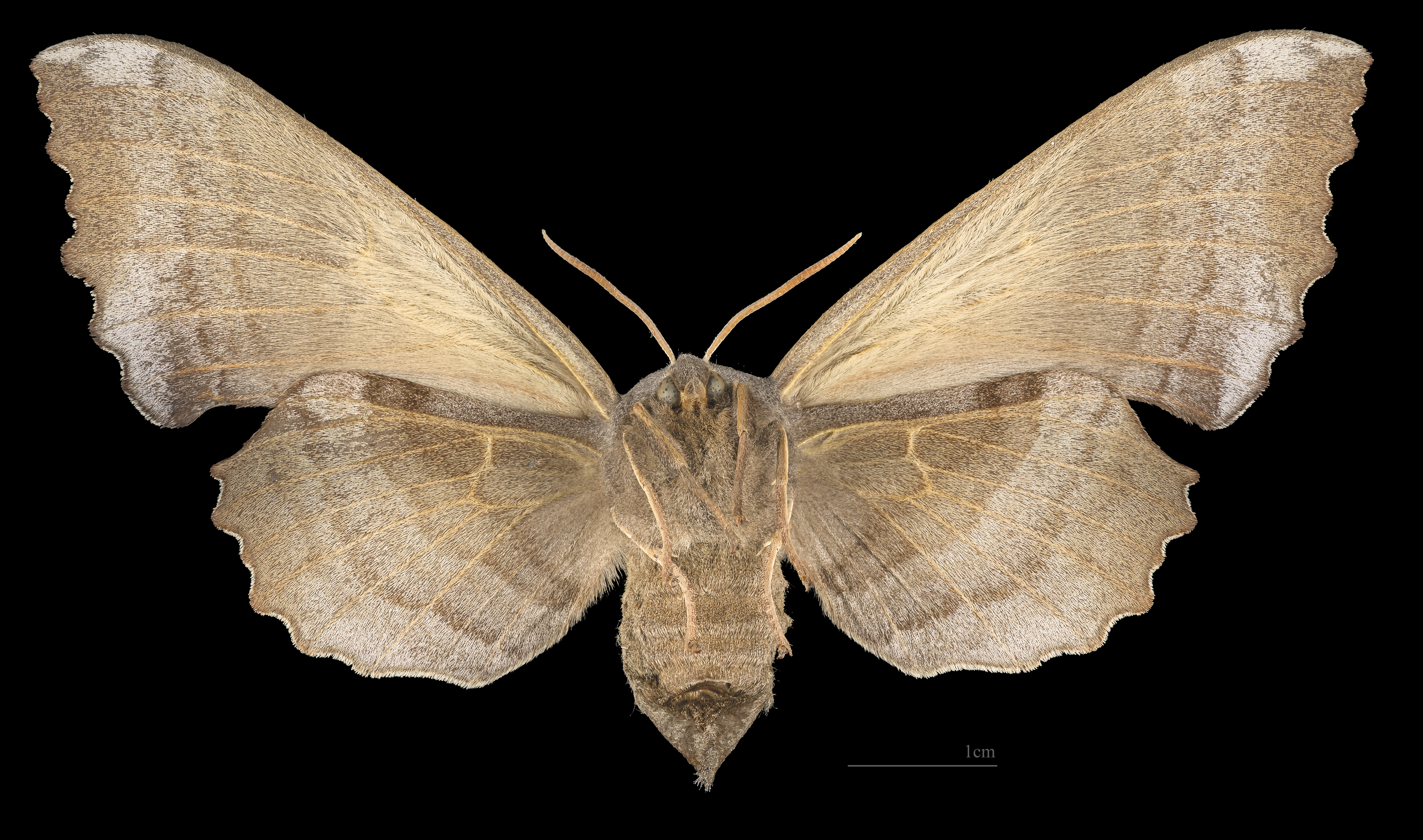
A female poplar hawkmoth, viewed from the front

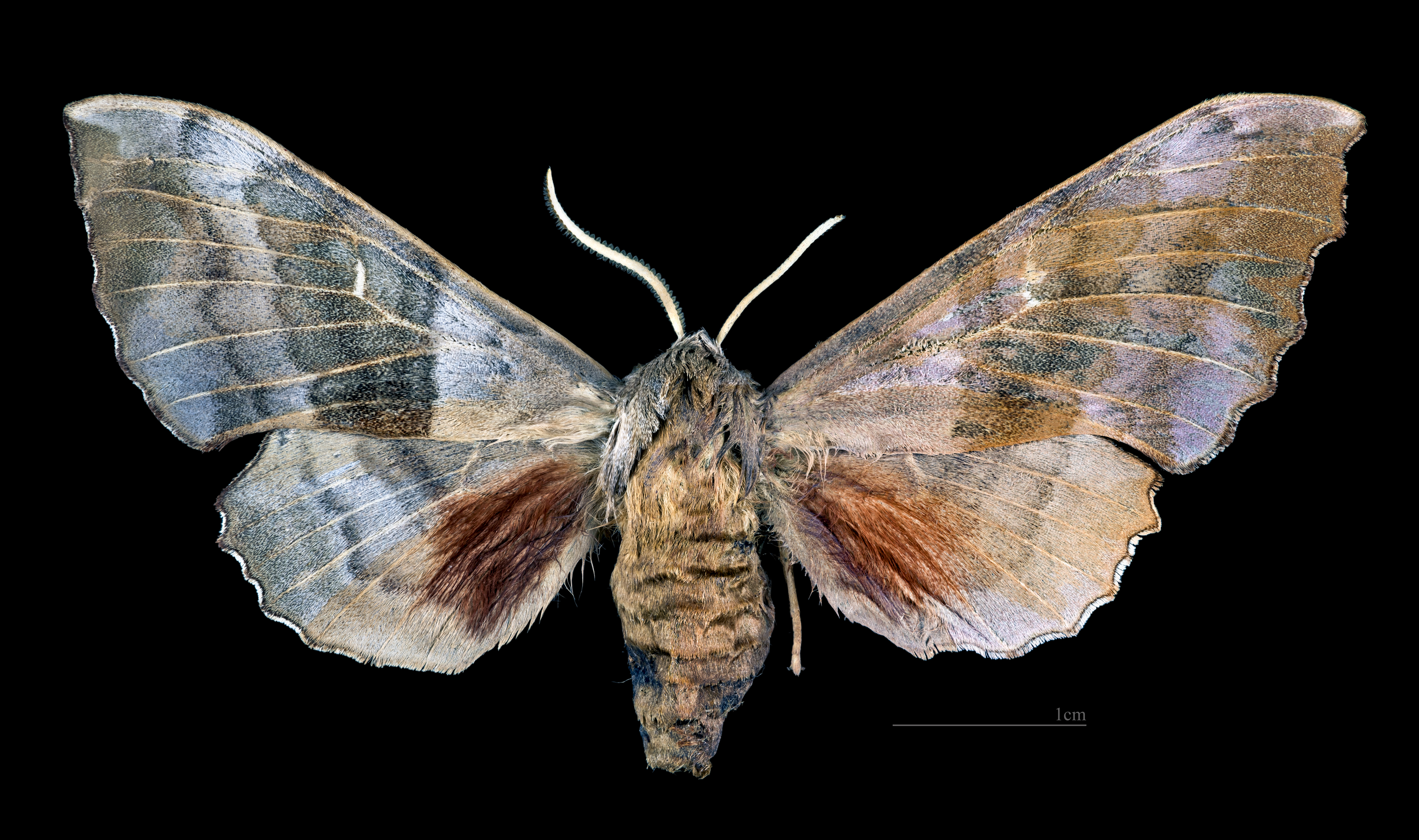
A gynandromorph poplar hawkmoth, viewed from the back

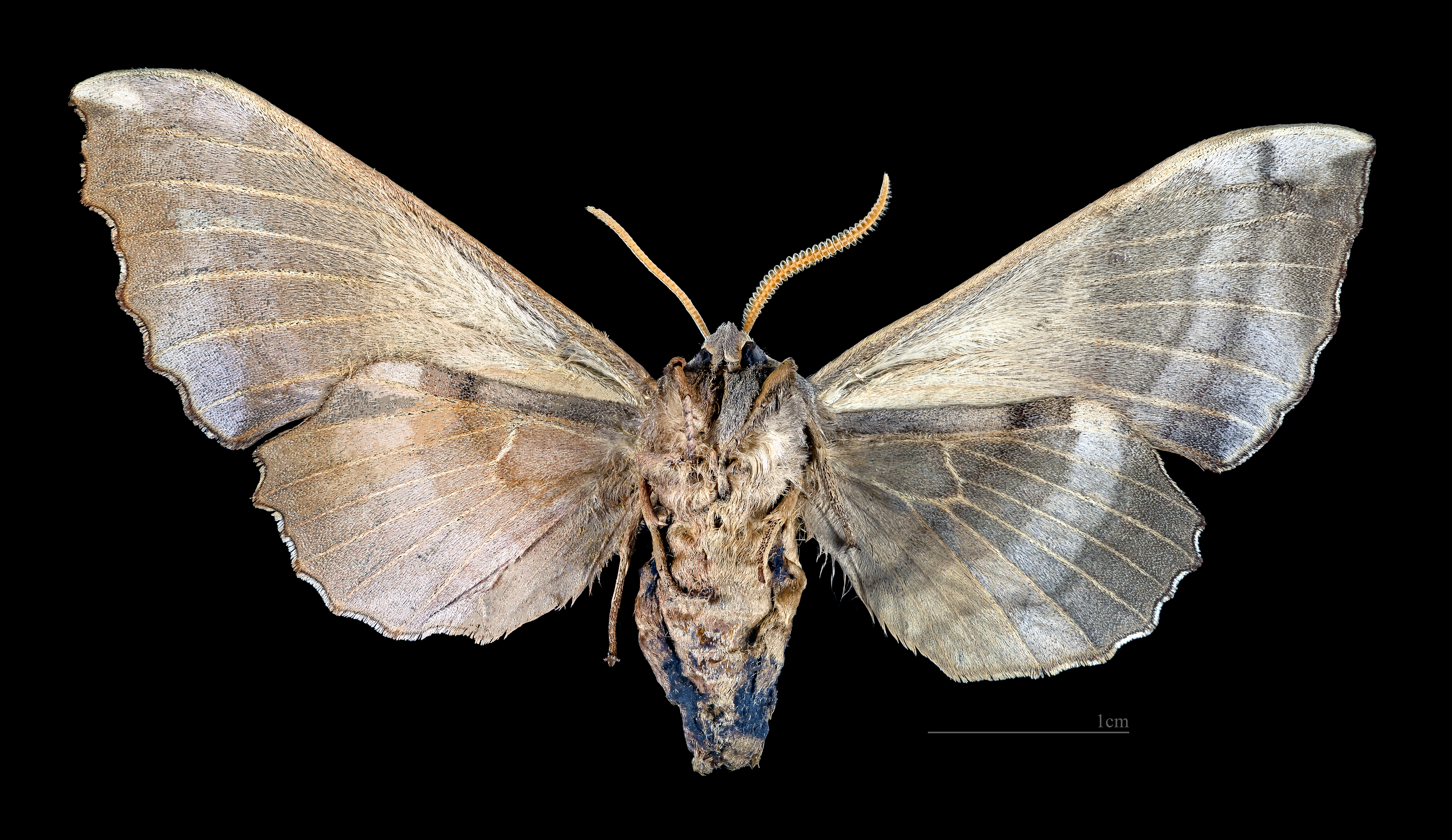
A gynandromorph poplar hawkmoth, viewed from the front
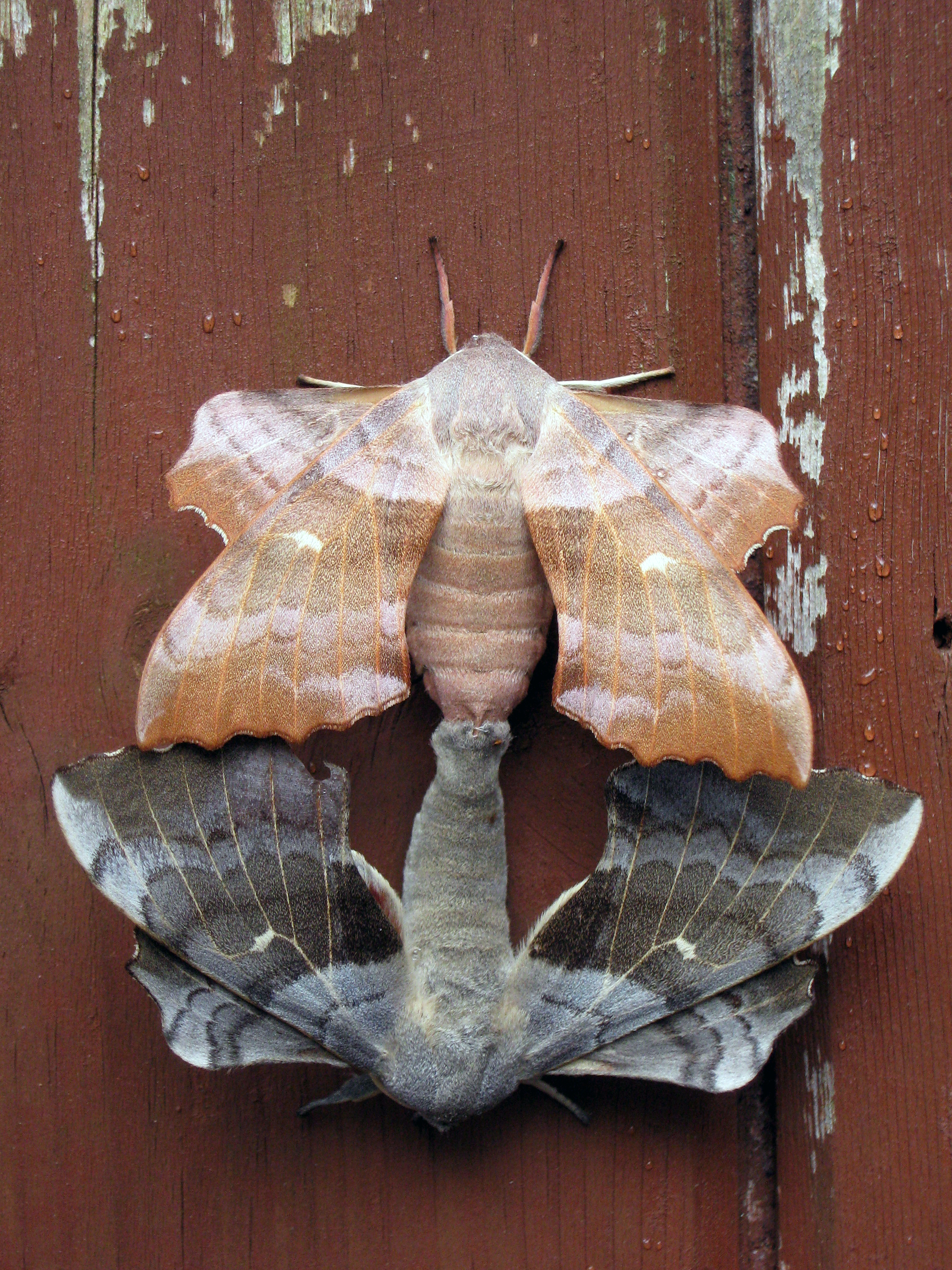
Mating pair showing both colour variants

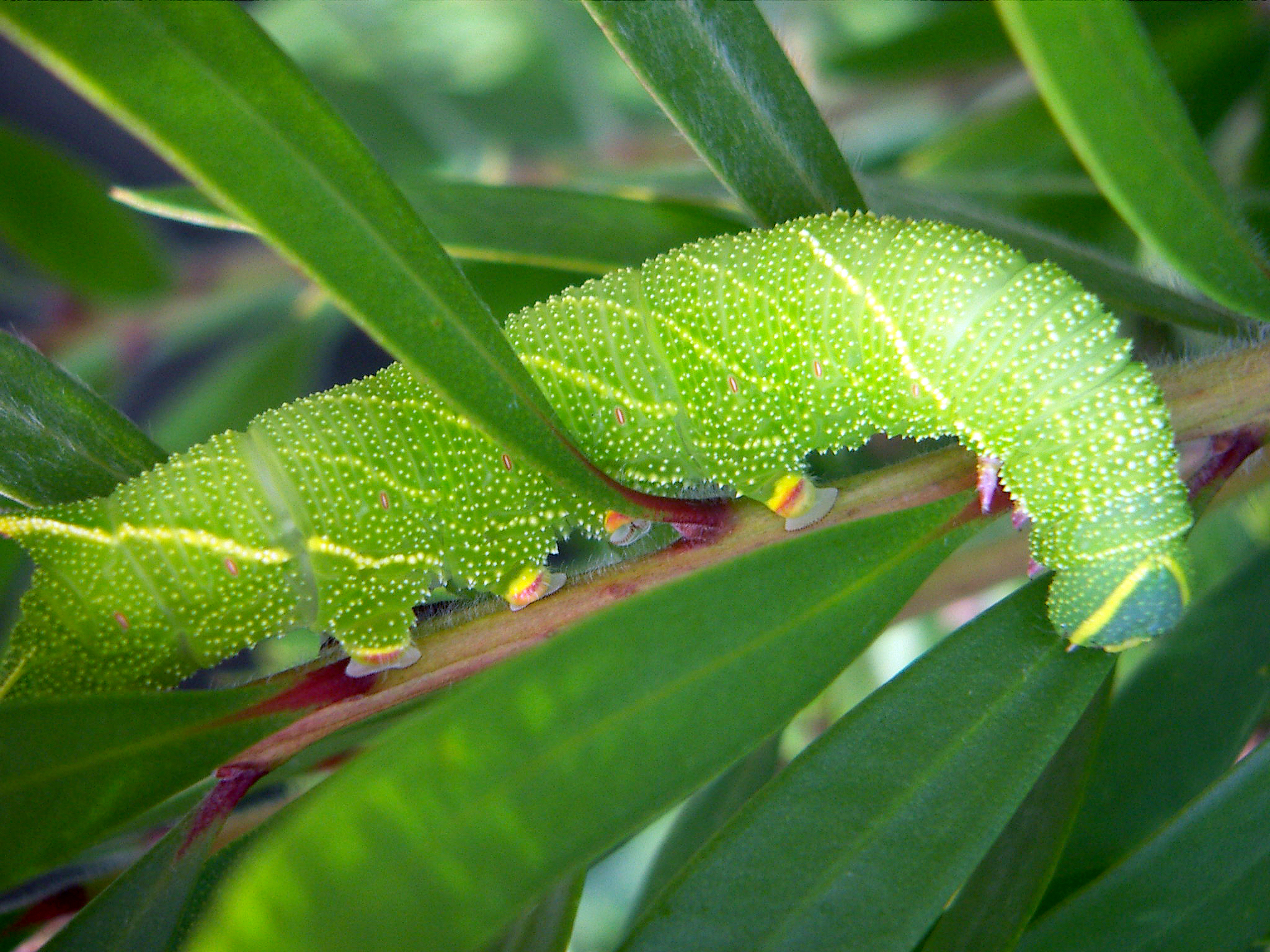
Larva

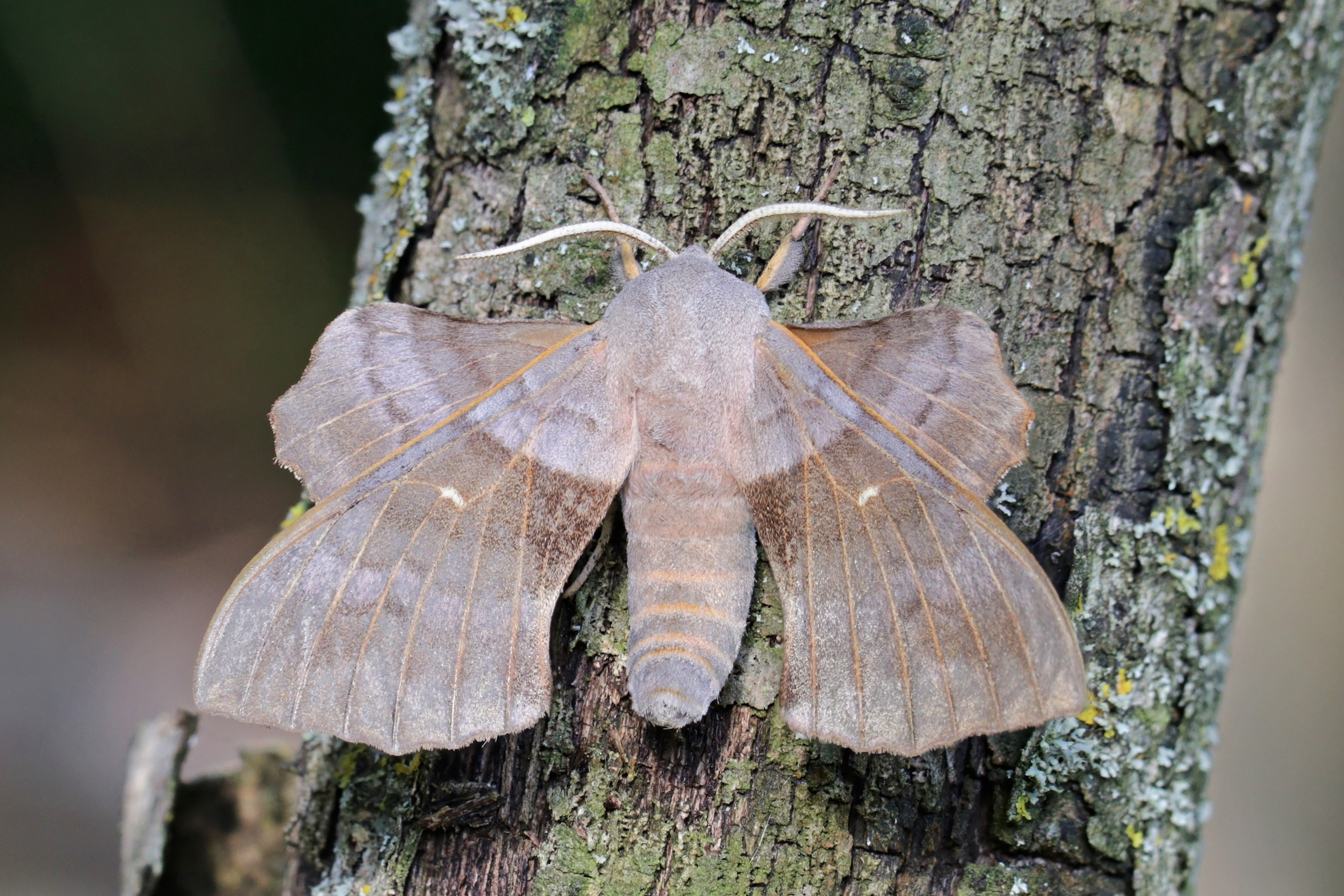
Showing hindwing held forward of forewing

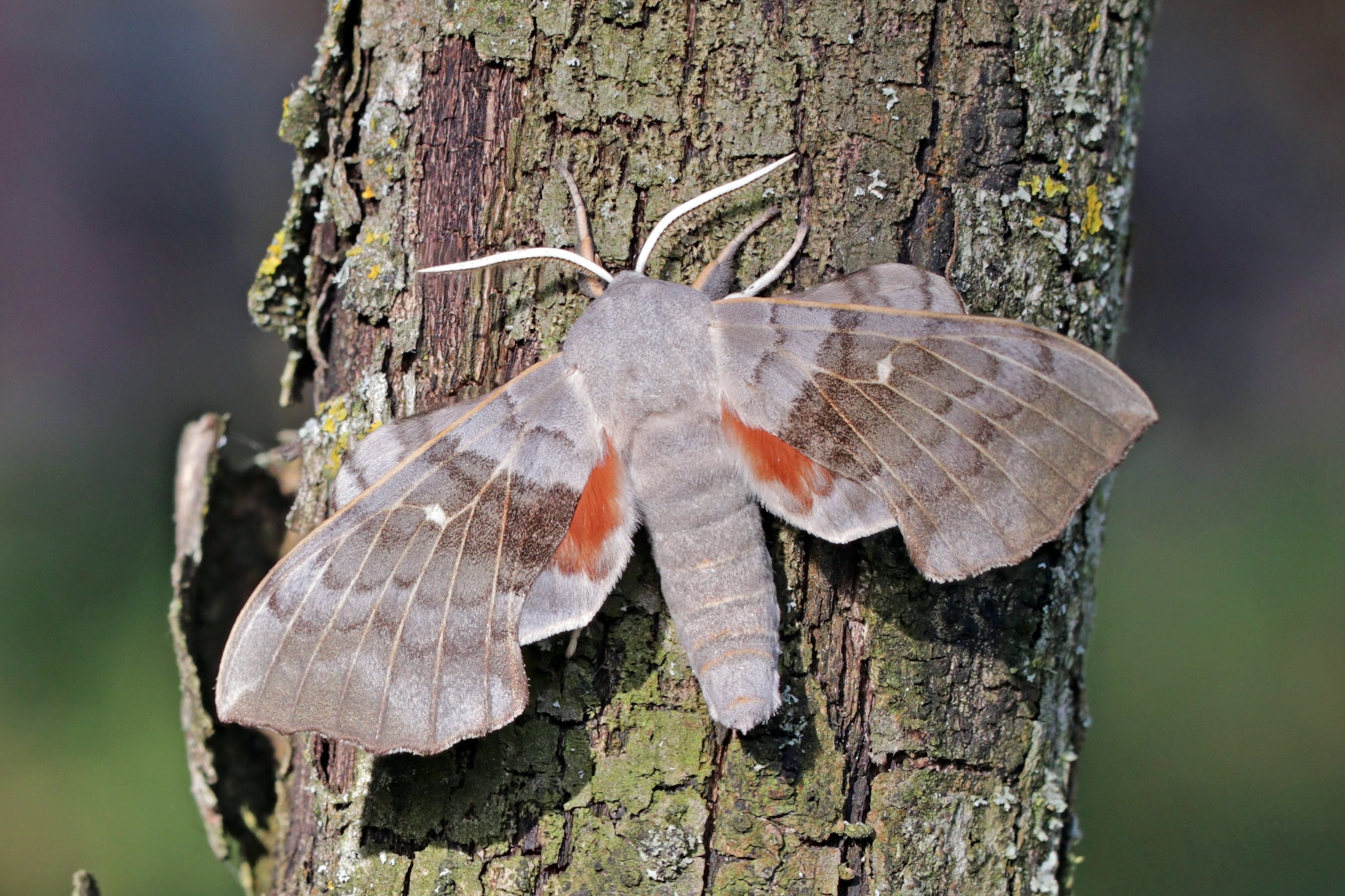
Imago, showing orange-red basal patch on hindwing

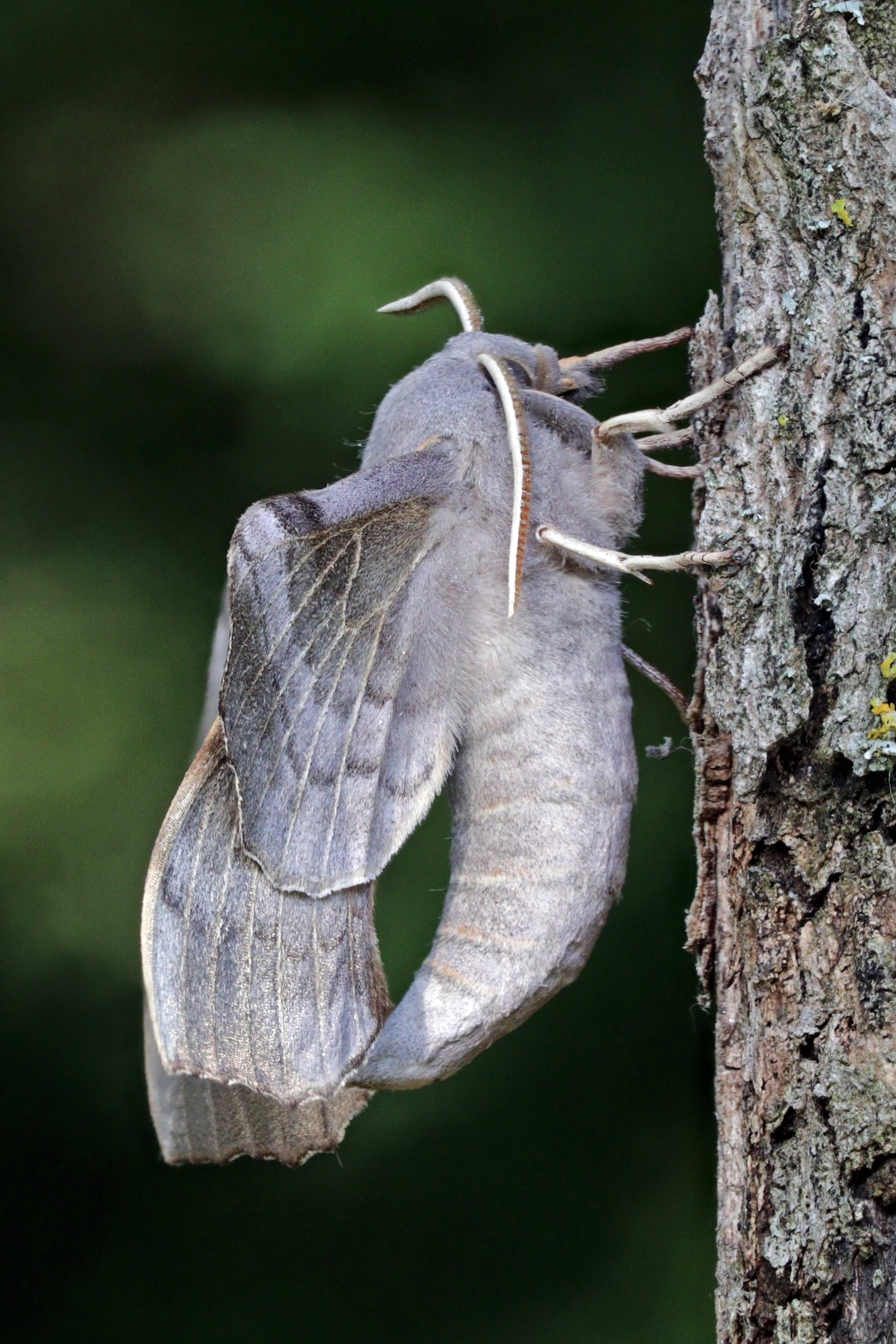
Imago, lateral view
