= Sharkstooth Peak =

Mountain in Colorado, United States

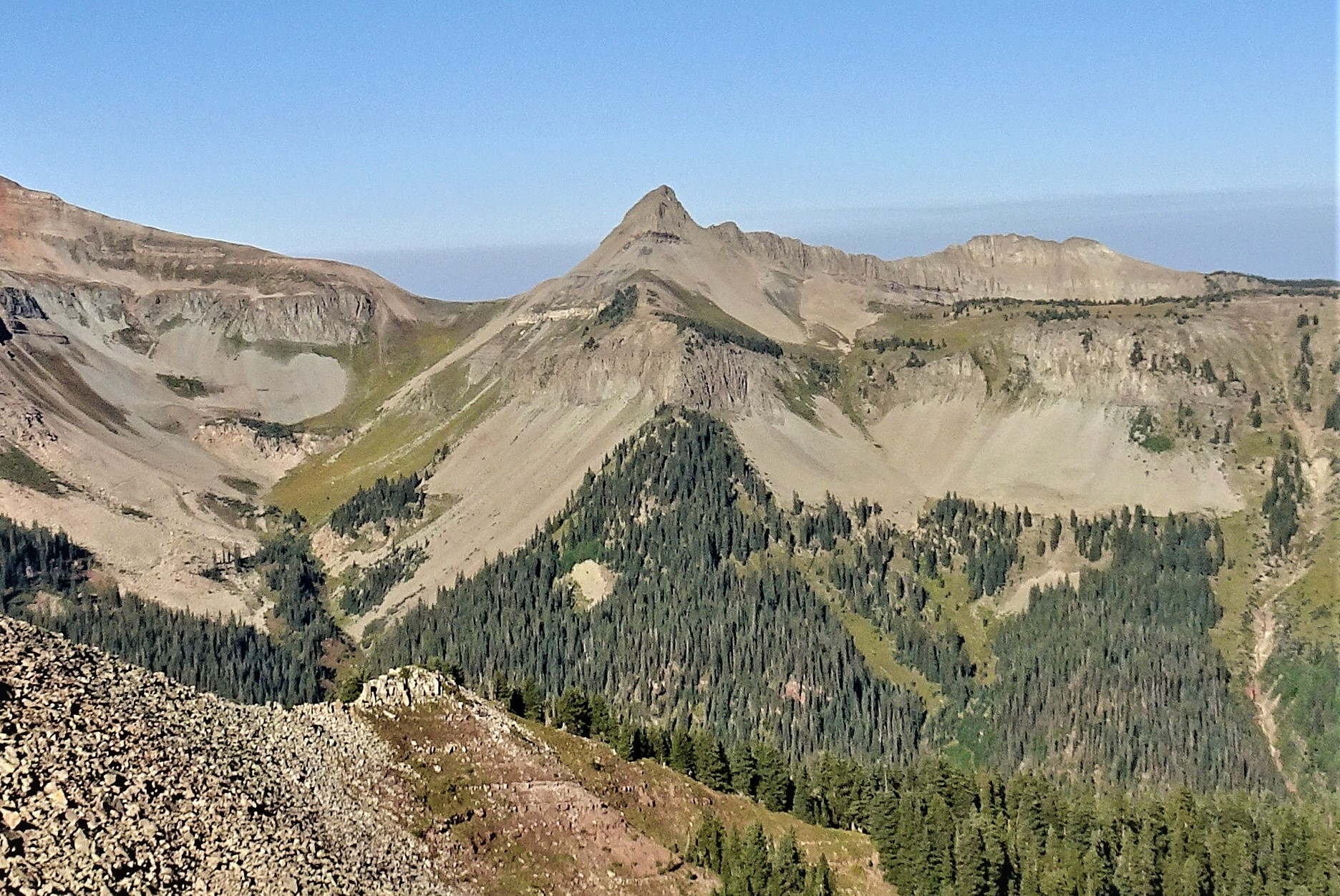
- East aspect

Highest point
- Elevation: 12,468 ft (3,800 m)
- Prominence: 526 ft (160 m)
- Parent peak: Lavender Peak (13,233 ft)
- Isolation: 0.91 mi (1.46 km)
- Coordinates: 37°27′35″N 108°04′23″W

Geography
- Location within Colorado Location within the United States
- Country: United States
- State: Colorado
- County: Montezuma
- Parent range: Rocky Mountains; San Juan Mountains; La Plata Mountains
- Topo map: USGS La Plata

Climbing
- Easiest route: class 2+

Sharkstooth Peak is a 12,468-foot-elevation (3,800-meter) mountain summit in Montezuma County, Colorado.

== Description ==
Sharkstooth Peak is located 17 miles (27 km) northwest of the community of Durango on land managed by San Juan National Forest. It is situated in the La Plata Mountains which are a subrange of the Rocky Mountains. Precipitation runoff from the mountain's west slope drains to the Mancos River and the other slopes drain into Bear Creek which is a tributary of the Dolores River. Topographic relief is significant as the summit rises 2,300 feet (700 meters) above Bear Creek in one mile (1.6 km). Neighbors include Centennial Peak, 0.91 miles (1.46 km) to the south-southwest, Lavender Peak, 1.35 miles (2.17 km) to the south-southwest, and Hesperus Mountain 1.36 miles (2.19 km) to the southwest. The mountain's toponym has been officially adopted by the United States Board on Geographic Names.

== Historical names ==
- Sharkstooth
- Sharkstooth Peak – 1949
- Sharktooth Peak

== Climate ==
According to the Köppen climate classification system, Sharkstooth Peak has an alpine climate with cold, snowy winters, and cool to warm summers. Due to its altitude, it receives precipitation all year, as snow in winter and as thunderstorms in summer, with a dry period in late spring.

== See also ==
- List of Colorado mountain ranges
- List of Colorado mountain summits
  - List of Colorado 4000 meter prominent summits
  - List of the most prominent summits of Colorado
- List of Colorado county high points
