= Babcock Peak =

Mountain in the American state of Colorado

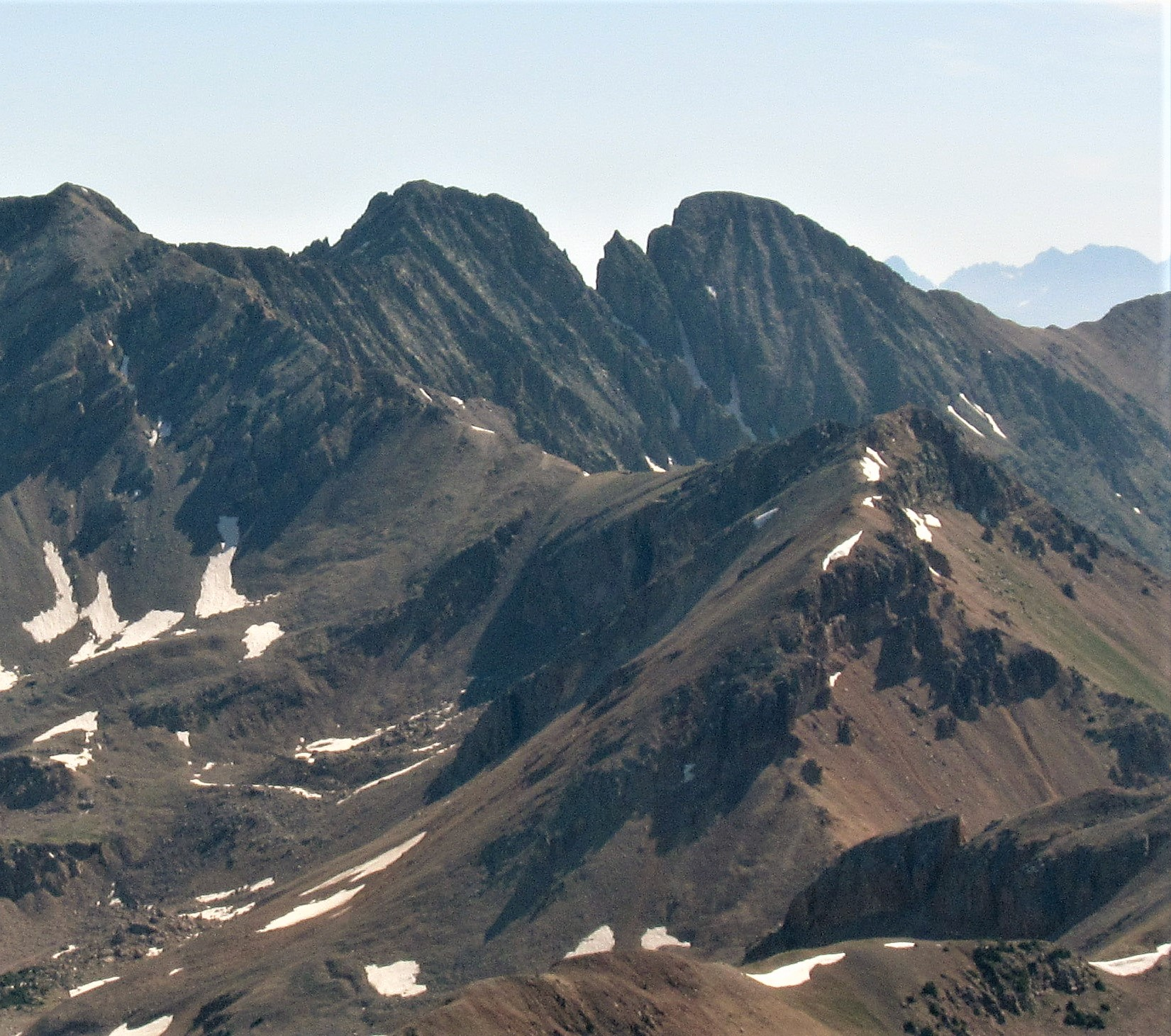
- Southwest aspect, aerial view (The true summit is the left peak, and the right peak is labelled Babcock Peak 13149 on USGS map)

Highest point
- Elevation: 13,161 ft (4,011 m)
- Prominence: 505 ft (154 m)
- Parent peak: Lavender Peak (13,233 ft)
- Isolation: 0.65 mi (1.05 km)
- Coordinates: 37°25′42″N 108°04′37″W

Geography
- Location within Colorado Location within the United States
- Country: United States
- State: Colorado
- County: La Plata
- Parent range: Rocky Mountains; San Juan Mountains; La Plata Mountains
- Topo map: USGS La Plata

Climbing
- Easiest route: class 3+ scrambling

Babcock Peak is a 13,161-foot-elevation (4,011-meter) mountain summit in La Plata County, Colorado.

== Description ==
Babcock Peak is located 15 miles (24 km) northwest of the community of Durango on land managed by San Juan National Forest. It ranks as the fourth-highest summit of the La Plata Mountains which are a subrange of the Rocky Mountains. Precipitation runoff from the mountain's west slope drains to the Mancos River and the southeast slope drains to the La Plata River. Topographic relief is significant as the summit rises over 3,900 feet (1,200 meters) above the river in 2.2 miles (3.5 km). Neighbors include Mount Moss 0.65 miles (1.05 km) to the north and Spiller Peak 0.43 miles (0.69 km) to the west. The mountain's toponym has been officially adopted by the United States Board on Geographic Names, and was recorded in publications in 1900. On February 25, 1962, a US Air Force T-29A plane struck the side of Babcock Peak in a snowstorm, killing the three crew.

== Climate ==
According to the Köppen climate classification system, Babcock Peak has an alpine climate with cold, snowy winters, and cool to warm summers. Due to its altitude, it receives precipitation all year, as snow in winter and as thunderstorms in summer, with a dry period in late spring.

== Gallery ==
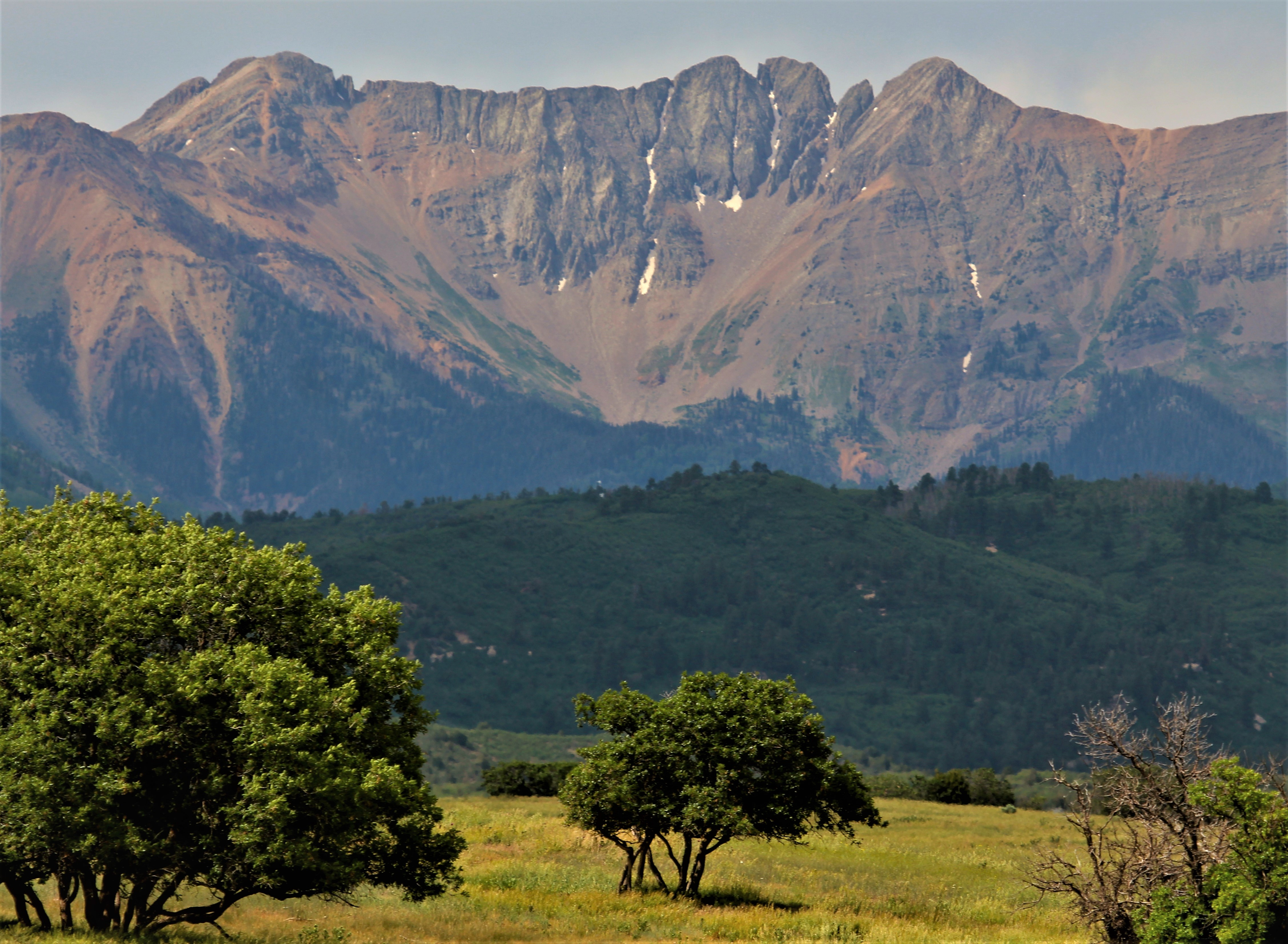
South aspects of Spiller Peak (left) and Babcock Peak(s)

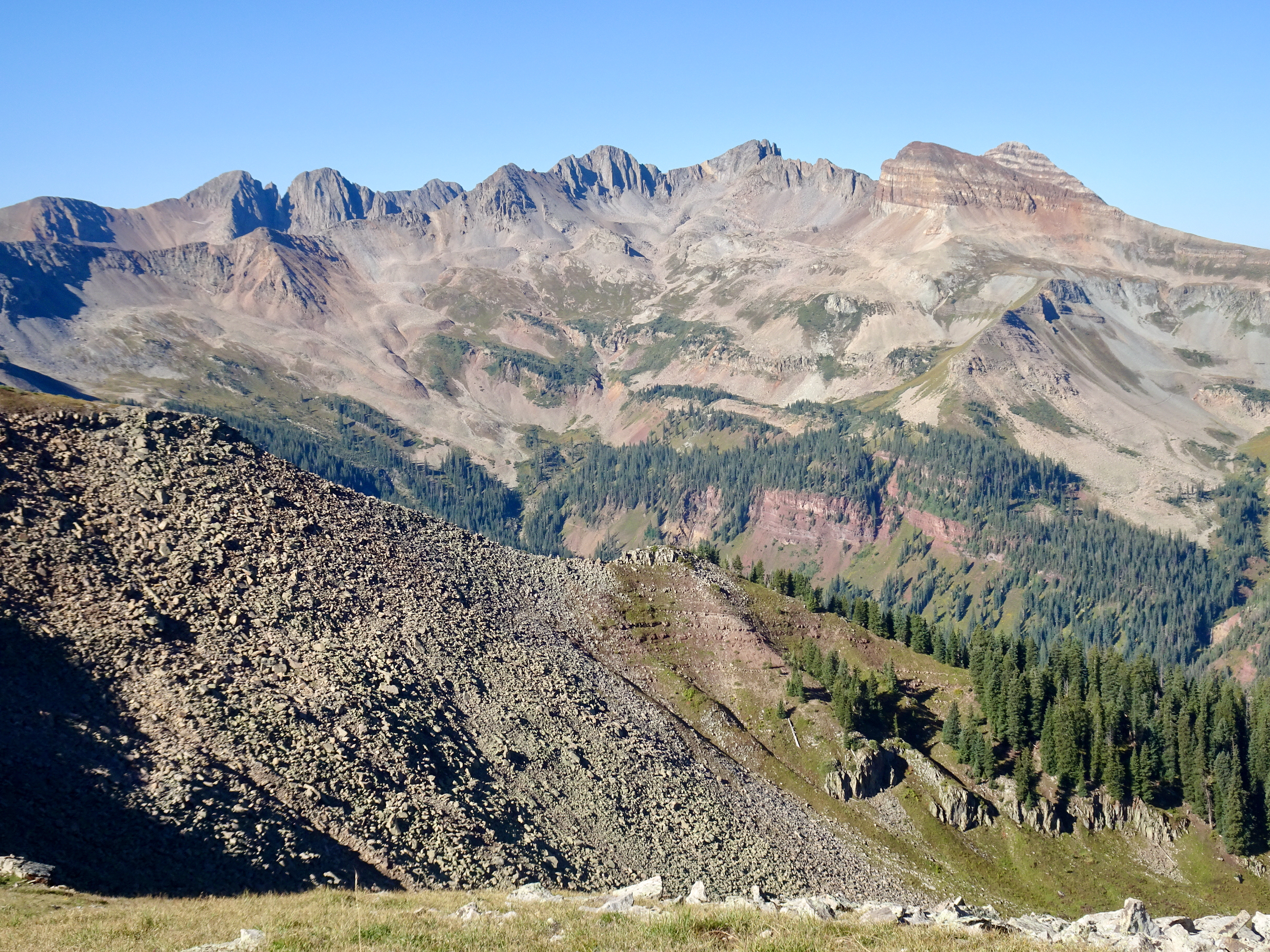
La Plata Mountains from NNE. Left to rightː Babcock Peak, Mt. Moss, Lavender Peak, Centennial Peak, Hesperus Mountain

== See also ==
- Thirteener
