= Diorite Peak =

Mountain in the state of Colorado

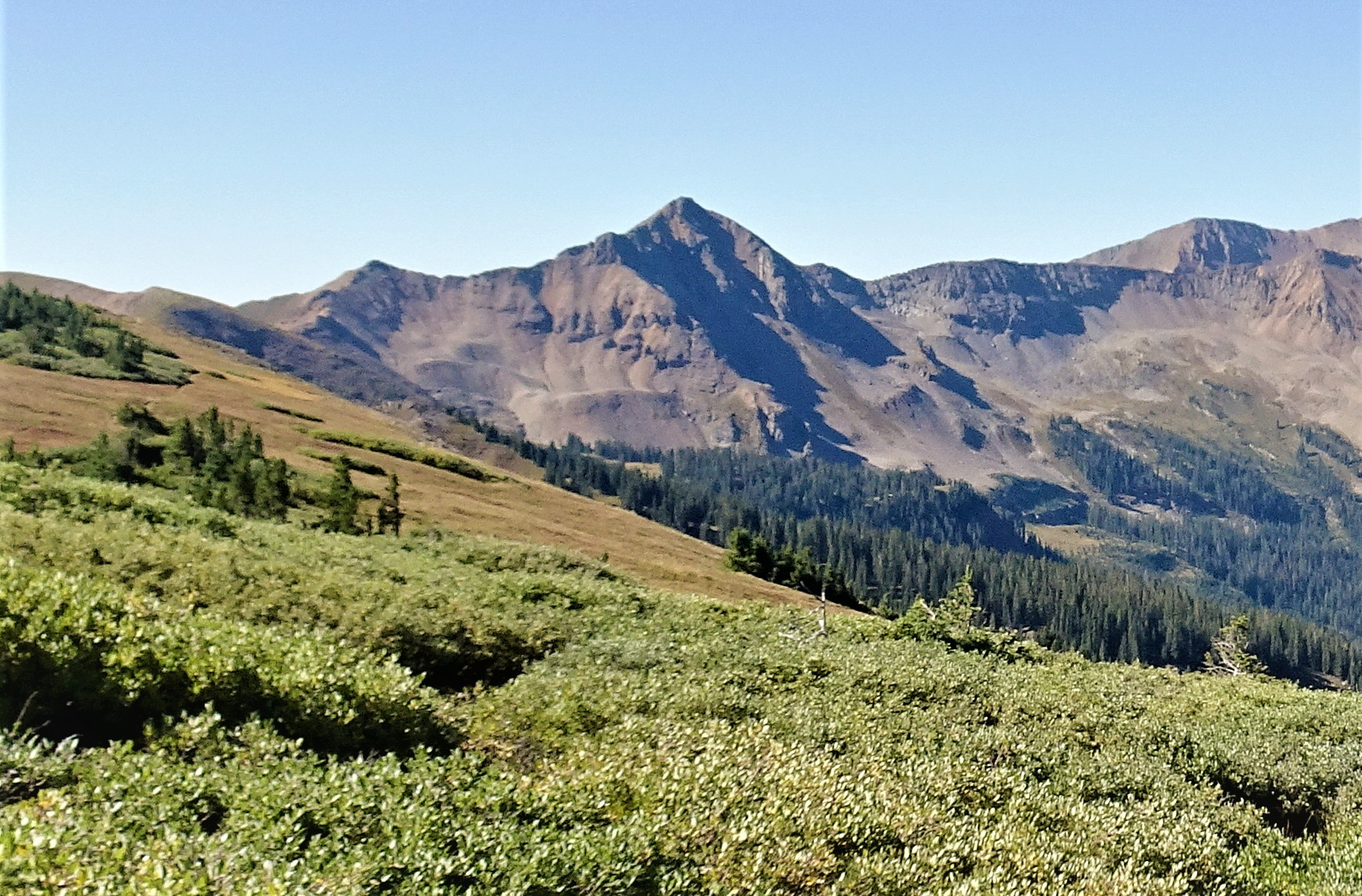
- North-northeast aspect

Highest point
- Elevation: 12,761 ft (3,890 m)
- Prominence: 441 ft (134 m)
- Parent peak: Mount Moss (13,192 ft)
- Isolation: 1.24 mi (2.00 km)
- Coordinates: 37°26′24″N 108°03′03″W

Naming
- Etymology: Diorite

Geography
- Location within Colorado Location within the United States
- Country: United States
- State: Colorado
- County: Montezuma / La Plata
- Parent range: Rocky Mountains; San Juan Mountains; La Plata Mountains
- Topo map: USGS La Plata

Climbing
- Easiest route: class 2

Diorite Peak is a 12,761-foot-elevation (3,890-meter) mountain summit on the common boundary shared by La Plata County and Montezuma County in Colorado.

== Description ==
Diorite Peak is located 14 miles (23 km) northwest of the community of Durango on land managed by San Juan National Forest. It ranks as the seventh-highest summit of the La Plata Mountains which are a subrange of the Rocky Mountains. Precipitation runoff from the mountain drains southeast to the La Plata River and north into the headwaters of Bear Creek which is a tributary of the Dolores River. Topographic relief is significant as the summit rises 2,760 feet (840 meters) above the La Plata River in one mile (1.6 km). Neighbors include Centennial Peak, 1.52 miles (2.45 km) to the west-northwest and Mount Moss, 1.51 miles (2.43 km) to the west. An ascent of Diorite Peak's summit involves hiking 5.2 miles (8.4 km) with 2,851 feet (869 meters) of elevation gain.

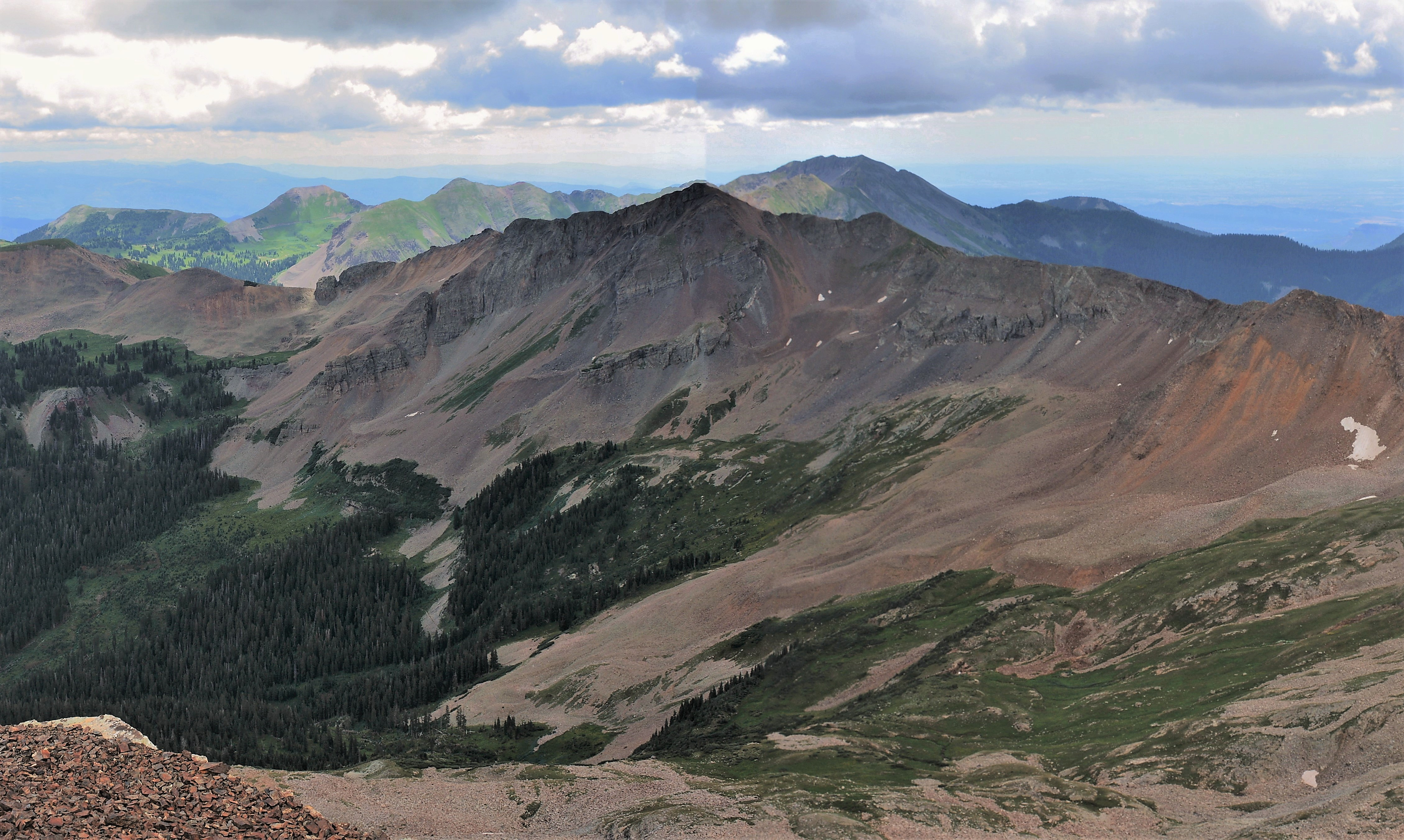
Diorite's west aspect seen from Centennial Peak

== Etymology ==
The mountain's toponym has been officially adopted by the United States Board on Geographic Names, and was recorded in publications as early as 1906. The peak is named for diorite which is an intrusive igneous rock formed by the slow cooling underground of magma. Diorite makes up a large stock of this peak, and a smaller mass makes up nearby Lewis Mountain.

== Climate ==
According to the Köppen climate classification system, Diorite Peak has an alpine climate with cold, snowy winters, and cool to warm summers. Due to its altitude, it receives precipitation all year, as snow in winter and as thunderstorms in summer, with a dry period in late spring.
