= Spiller Peak =

Mountain in the state of Colorado

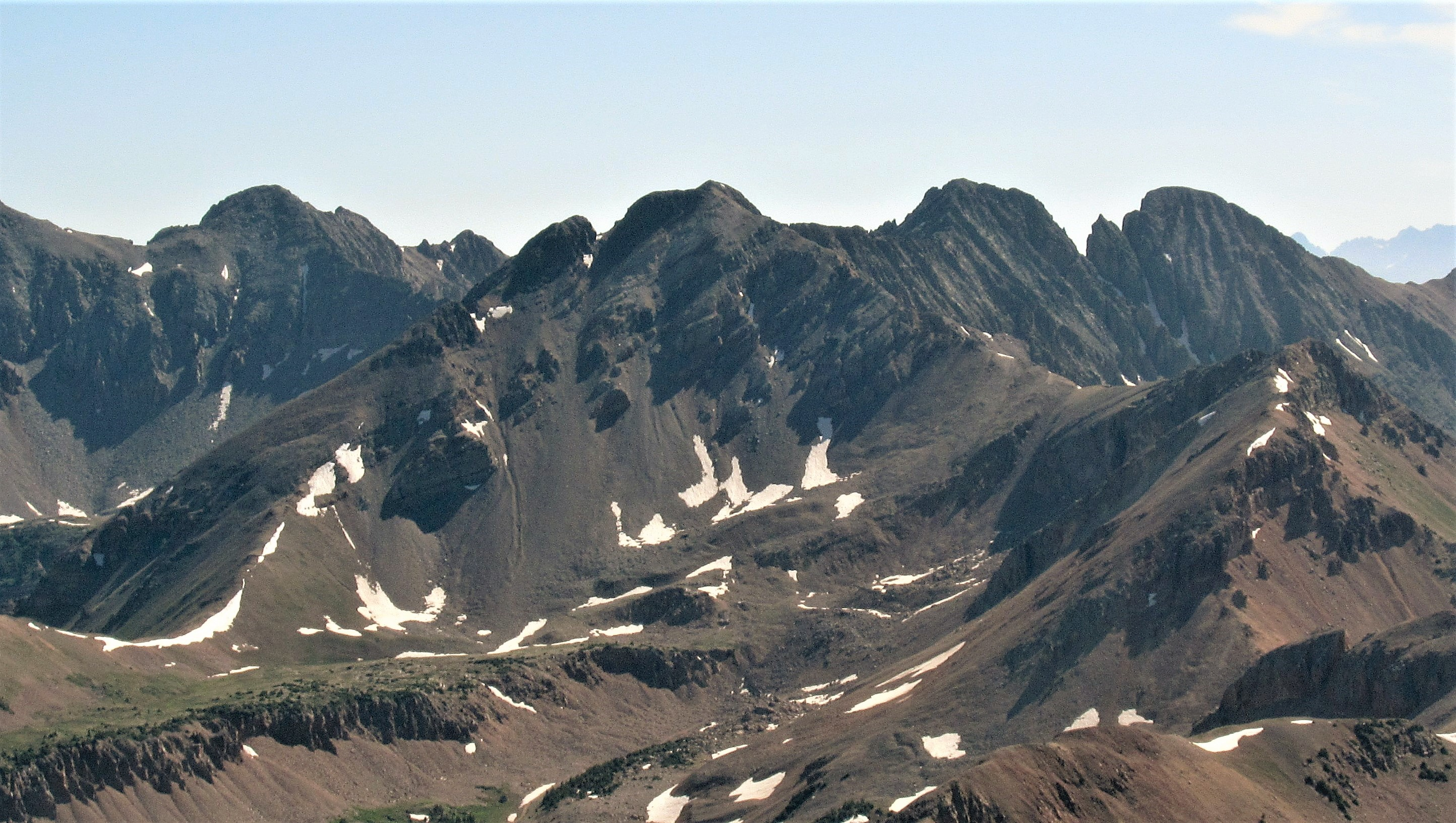
- Southwest aspect, centered (Mt. Moss to left, Babcock Peak to right)

Highest point
- Elevation: 13,123 ft (4,000 m)
- Prominence: 196 ft (60 m)
- Parent peak: Babcock Peak (13,161 ft)
- Isolation: 0.55 mi (0.89 km)
- Coordinates: 37°25′40″N 108°05′14″W

Geography
- Location within Colorado Location within the United States
- Country: United States
- State: Colorado
- County: Montezuma / La Plata
- Parent range: Rocky Mountains; San Juan Mountains; La Plata Mountains
- Topo map: USGS La Plata

Climbing
- Easiest route: Southeast face

Spiller Peak is a 13,123-foot-elevation (4,000-meter) mountain summit on the common boundary shared by La Plata County and Montezuma County in Colorado.

== Description ==
Spiller Peak is located 15 miles (24 km) northwest of the community of Durango on land managed by San Juan National Forest. It ranks as the fifth-highest summit of the La Plata Mountains which are a subrange of the Rocky Mountains. Precipitation runoff from the mountain's west slope drains to the Mancos River and the southeast slope drains to the La Plata River. Topographic relief is significant as the summit rises 3,900 feet (1,200 meters) above the La Plata River in 2.5 miles (4.0 km) and 1,700 feet (520 meters) above Owen Basin in one-half mile (0.8 km). Neighbors include Mount Moss 0.9 miles (1.4 km) to the north-northeast and Babcock Peak 0.43 miles (0.69 km) to the east. The mountain's toponym has been officially adopted by the United States Board on Geographic Names, and was recorded in publications in 1906. J. Calvert Spiller was a topographer with the Wheeler Survey in the 1870s. He made the first ascent of Redcloud Peak in 1874 and also named it.

== Climate ==
According to the Köppen climate classification system, Spiller Peak has an alpine climate with cold, snowy winters, and cool to warm summers. Due to its altitude, it receives precipitation all year, as snow in winter and as thunderstorms in summer, with a dry period in late spring.

== Gallery ==
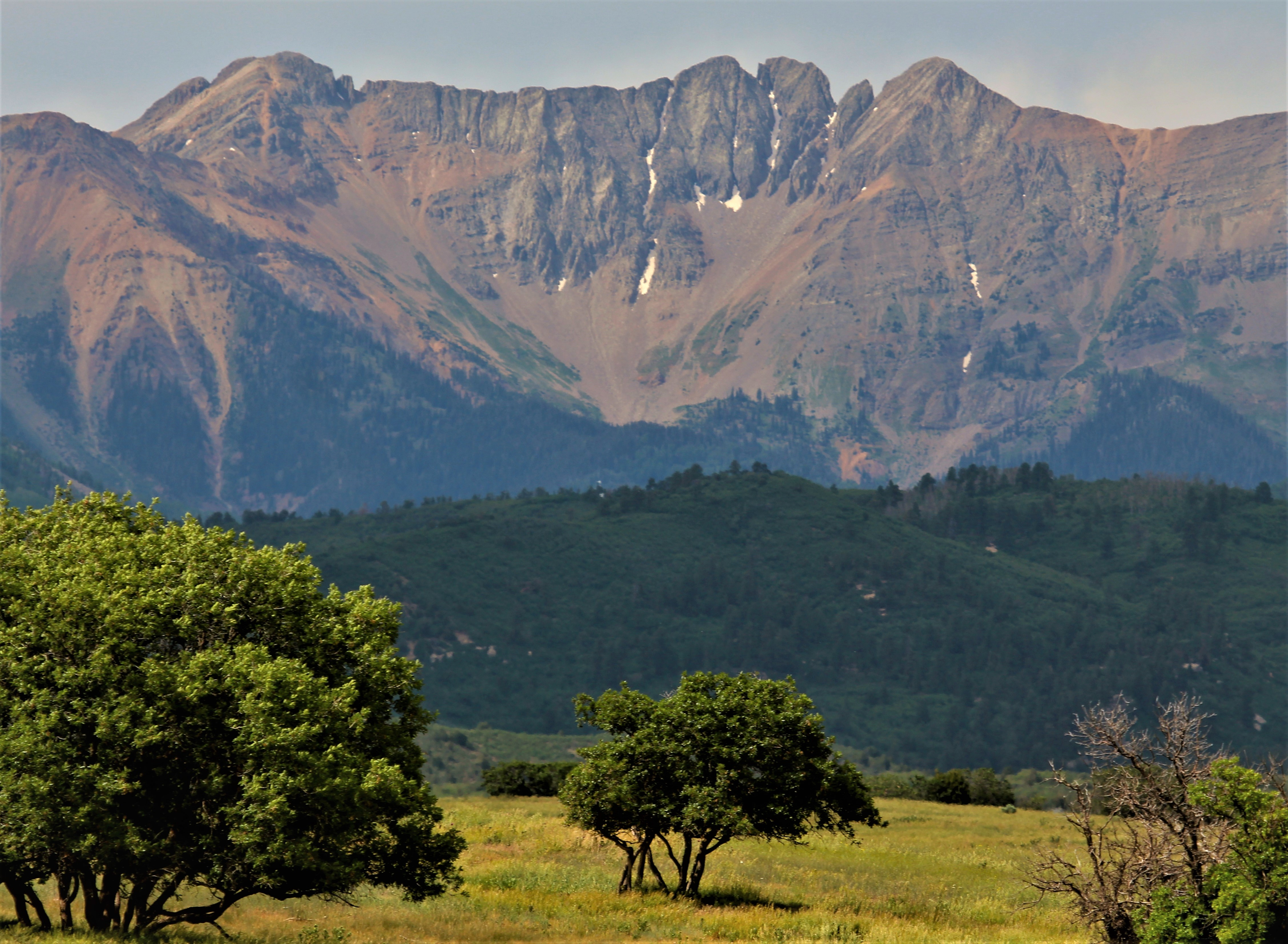
South aspects of Spiller Peak (left) and Babcock Peak(s)

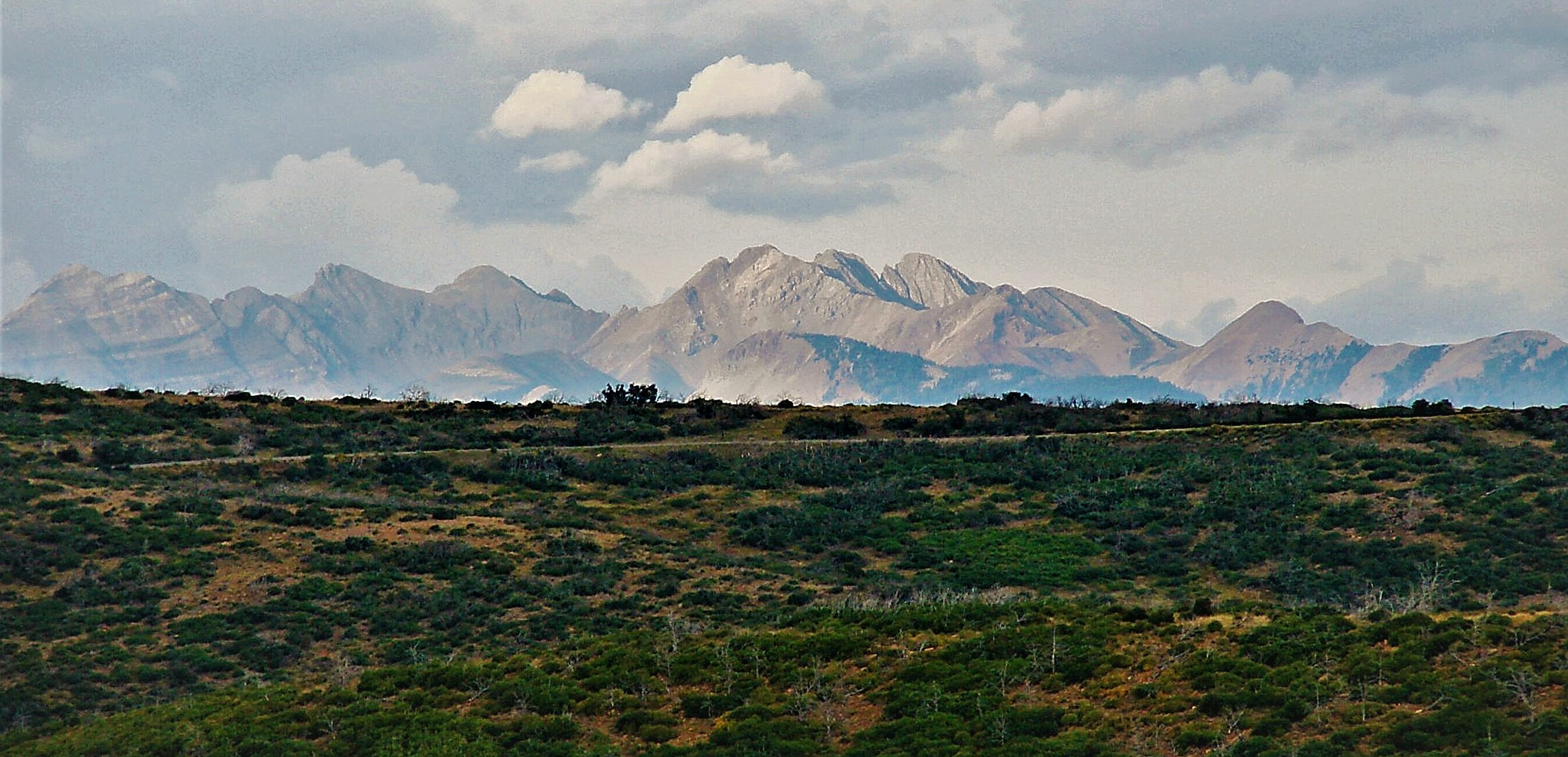
West aspect of Spiller Peak centered, surrounded by La Plata Mountains

== See also ==
- Thirteener
