= East Mancos River =

Physical characteristics
- Source
  - coordinates: 37°25′27″N 108°05′38″W
- Mouth
  - location: Confluence with West Mancos
  - coordinates: 37°21′26″N 108°15′17″W
  - elevation: 7,241 ft (2,207 m)

Basin features
- Progression: Mancos—San Juan—Colorado

East Mancos River is a 12.2-mile-long (19.6 km) tributary of the Mancos River in Montezuma County, Colorado. The river flows west from a source in the La Plata Mountains to a confluence with the West Mancos River that forms the Mancos River.

== See also ==
- List of rivers of Colorado
- List of tributaries of the Colorado River
