= West Mancos River =

Physical characteristics
- Source
  - location: Confluence of North Fork and South Fork
  - coordinates: 37°27′23″N 108°08′49″W
- Mouth
  - location: Confluence with East Mancos
  - coordinates: 37°21′26″N 108°15′17″W
  - elevation: 7,241 ft (2,207 m)

Basin features
- Progression: Mancos—San Juan—Colorado

West Mancos River is a 13.1-mile-long (21.1 km) tributary of the Mancos River in Montezuma County, Colorado. The river flows from the confluence of its North and South forks in the San Juan National Forest to a confluence with the East Mancos River that forms the Mancos River.

== See also ==
- List of rivers of Colorado
- List of tributaries of the Colorado River
