= South Fork West Mancos River =

Physical characteristics
- Source
  - coordinates: 37°26′15″N 108°05′02″W
- Mouth
  - location: Confluence with North Fork
  - coordinates: 37°27′23″N 108°08′49″W
  - elevation: 9,186 ft (2,800 m)

Basin features
- Progression: West Mancos—Mancos; San Juan—Colorado

South Fork West Mancos River is a tributary of the West Mancos River in Montezuma County, Colorado. The river flows from a source in the Owen Basin of the San Juan National Forest to a confluence with the North Fork that forms the West Mancos River.

== See also ==
- List of rivers of Colorado
- List of tributaries of the Colorado River
