= Centennial Peak (Colorado) =

Mountain in the state of Colorado

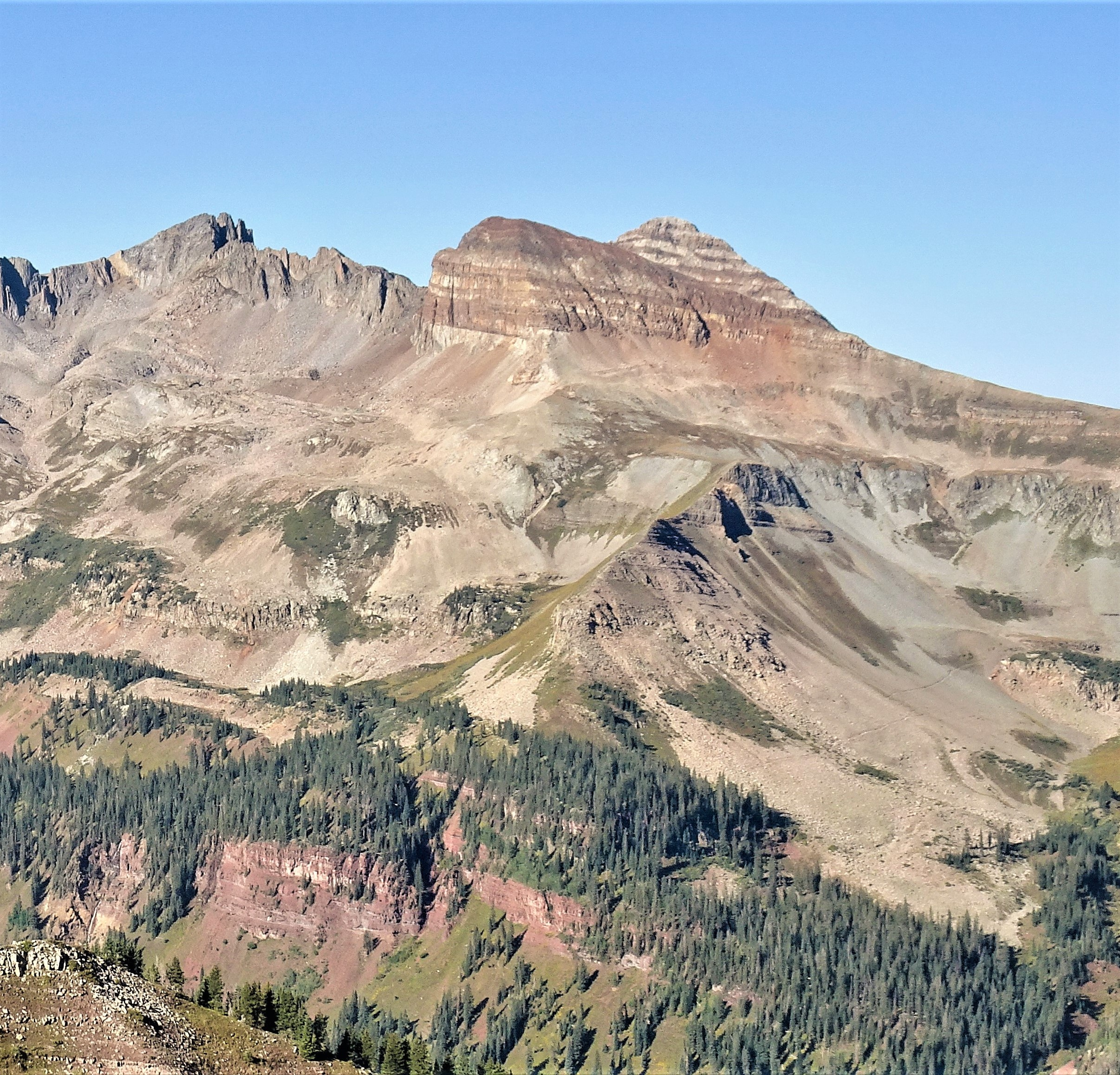
- Northeast aspect, centered (Lavender Peak to left. Hesperus behind, right)

Highest point
- Elevation: 13,062 ft (3,981 m)
- Prominence: 262 ft (80 m)
- Parent peak: Lavender Peak (13,233 ft)
- Isolation: 0.43 mi (0.69 km)
- Coordinates: 37°26′50″N 108°04′37″W

Naming
- Etymology: Centennial

Geography
- Location within Colorado Location within the United States
- Country: United States
- State: Colorado
- County: Montezuma
- Parent range: Rocky Mountains; San Juan Mountains; La Plata Mountains
- Topo map: USGS La Plata

Climbing
- Easiest route: class 2 via North ridge

Centennial Peak is a 13,062-foot-elevation (3,981-meter) mountain summit in Montezuma County, Colorado.

== Description ==
Centennial Peak is located 16 miles (26 km) northwest of the community of Durango on land managed by San Juan National Forest. It ranks as the six-highest summit of the La Plata Mountains which are a subrange of the Rocky Mountains. Precipitation runoff from the mountain's west slope drains to the Mancos River and the east slope drains into the headwaters of Bear Creek which is a tributary of the Dolores River. Topographic relief is significant as the summit rises 2,460 feet (750 meters) above Bear Creek in one mile (1.6 km) and 1,500 feet (460 meters) above Sliderock Basin in one-half mile (0.8 km). Neighbors include Mount Moss, 0.57 miles (0.92 km) to the south, Lavender Peak, 0.45 miles (0.72 km) to the south-southwest, and Hesperus Mountain 0.68 miles (1.09 km) to the west-southwest. An ascent of Centennial Peak's summit involves hiking 4.4 miles (7.1 km) with 2,130 feet (650 meters) of elevation gain.

== Etymology ==
The mountain's toponym was officially adopted on July 8, 1976, by the United States Board on Geographic Names as proposed by the Colorado Centennial-Bicentennial Commission to commemorate 100 years of statehood since it was admitted to the Union on August 1, 1876. Prior to that the landform was called "Banded Mountain", a descriptive name attributable to the alternating colored strata of sedimentary rock.

== Climate ==
According to the Köppen climate classification system, Centennial Peak has an alpine climate with cold, snowy winters, and cool to warm summers. Due to its altitude, it receives precipitation all year, as snow in winter and as thunderstorms in summer, with a dry period in late spring.

== See also ==
- Thirteener
