= Mount Moss =

Mountain in the state of Colorado

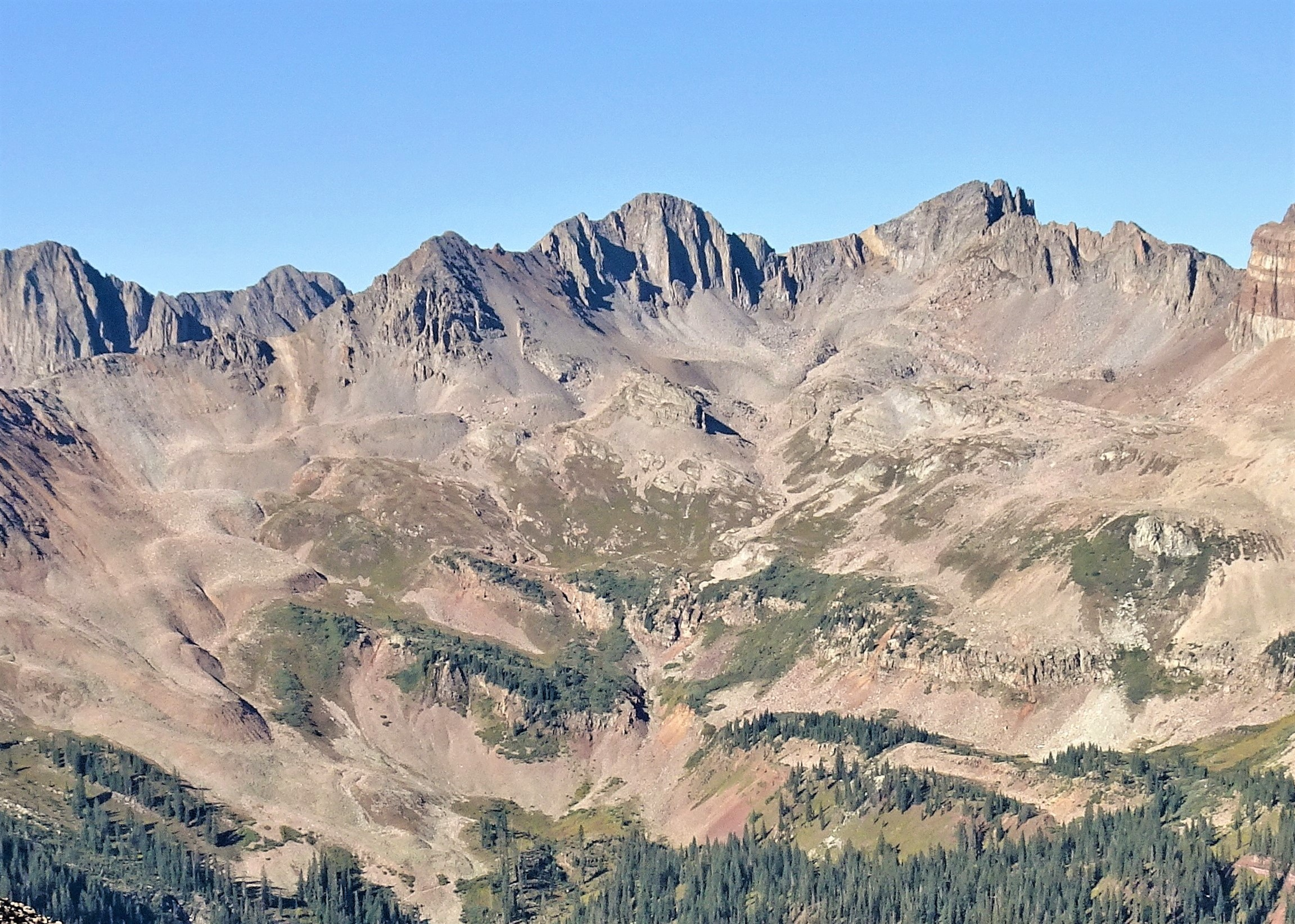
- Northeast aspect, centered (Lavender Peak to right)

Highest point
- Elevation: 13,192 ft (4,021 m)
- Prominence: 272 ft (83 m)
- Parent peak: Lavender Peak (13,233 ft)
- Isolation: 0.23 mi (0.37 km)
- Coordinates: 37°26′20″N 108°04′42″W

Geography
- Location within Colorado Location within the United States
- Country: United States
- State: Colorado
- County: Montezuma / La Plata
- Parent range: Rocky Mountains; San Juan Mountains; La Plata Mountains
- Topo map: USGS La Plata

Climbing
- Easiest route: class 2+

Mount Moss is a 13,192-foot-elevation (4,021-meter) mountain summit on the common boundary shared by La Plata County and Montezuma County in Colorado.

== Description ==
Mount Moss is located 16 miles (26 km) northwest of the community of Durango on land managed by San Juan National Forest. It ranks as the third-highest summit of the La Plata Mountains which are a subrange of the Rocky Mountains. Precipitation runoff from the mountain's west slope drains to the Mancos River, the southeast slope drains to the La Plata River, and the northeast slope drains into the headwaters of Bear Creek which is a tributary of the Dolores River. Topographic relief is significant as the summit rises 3,500 feet (1,100 meters) above the La Plata River in two miles (3.2 km) and 1,600 feet (490 meters) above Owen Basin in one-half mile (0.8 km). Neighbors include Centennial Peak, 0.57 miles (0.92 km) to the north, Lavender Peak, 0.23 miles (0.37 km) to the northwest, and Hesperus Mountain 0.72 miles (1.16 km) to the northwest.

== Etymology ==
The mountain's toponym has been officially adopted by the United States Board on Geographic Names. The name was applied by Ferdinand Vandeveer Hayden circa 1875 to honor John Thomas Moss (1839–1880), an American frontiersman, prospector, and miner. John Moss was the founder of Parrott City which was six miles south of the peak. Moss and E.H. Cooper platted the townsite in 1874 and by 1876 it had 50 buildings, a courthouse and two sawmills.

== Climate ==
According to the Köppen climate classification system, Mount Moss has an alpine climate with cold, snowy winters, and cool to warm summers. Due to its altitude, it receives precipitation all year, as snow in winter and as thunderstorms in summer, with a dry period in late spring.

== Gallery ==
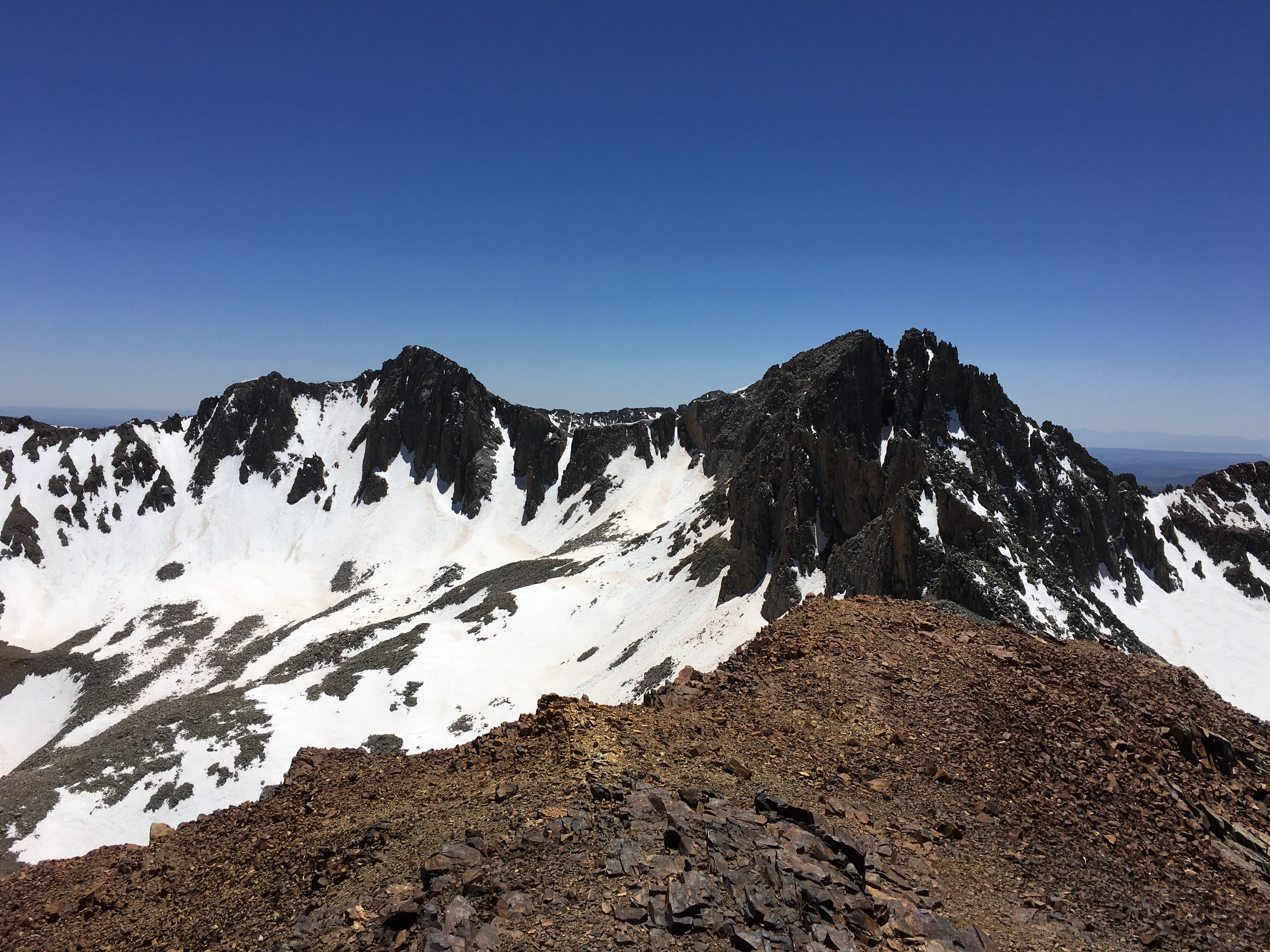
Mount Moss (left) and Lavender Peak (right) viewed from Centennial Peak

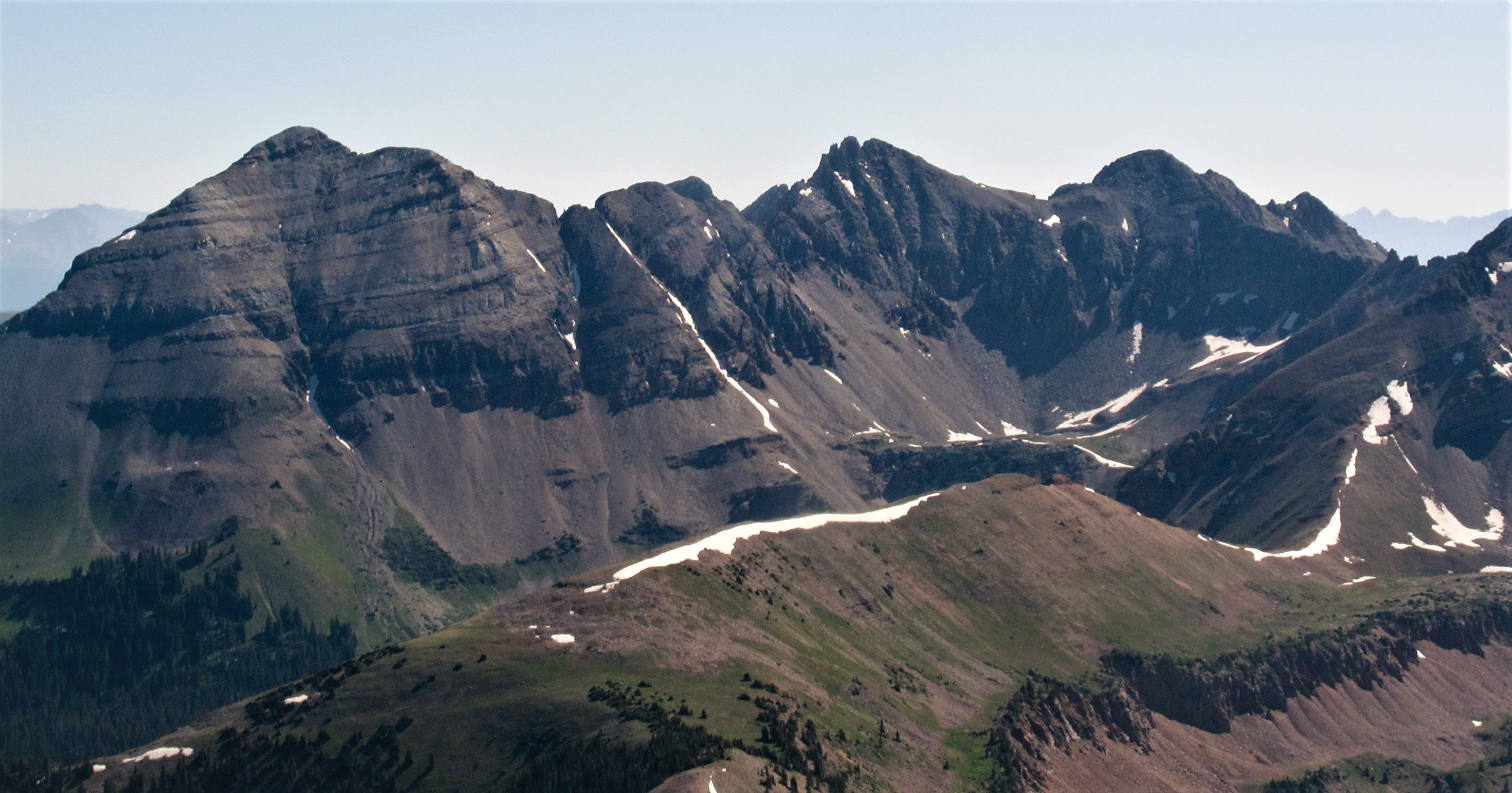
Aerial from west: Hesperus, Lavender, Moss

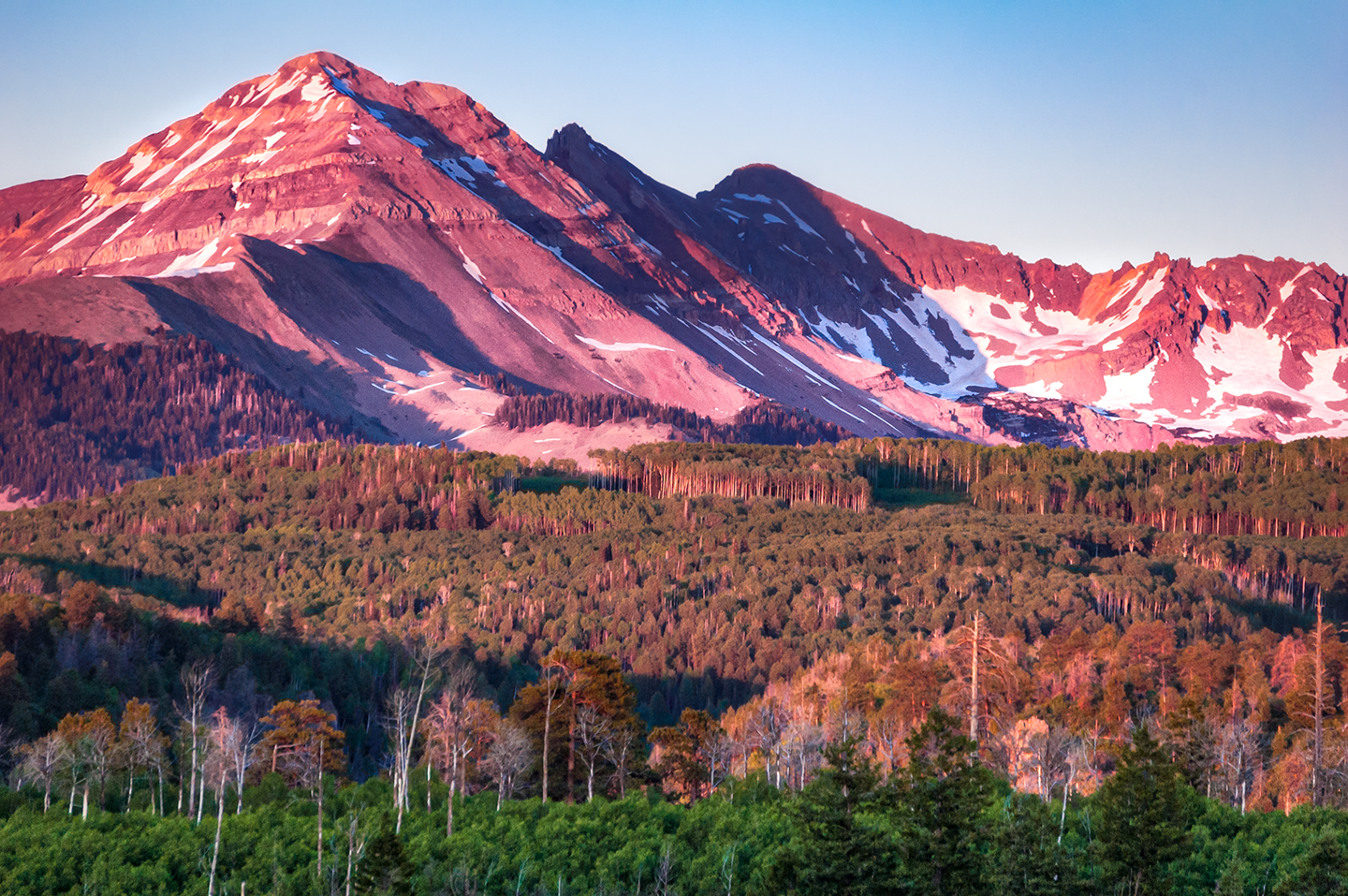
Hesperus Mountain (left) and Mount Moss (center) from the west at sunset

== See also ==
- Thirteener
