= La Plata Mountains =

Mountain range in Colorado, United States

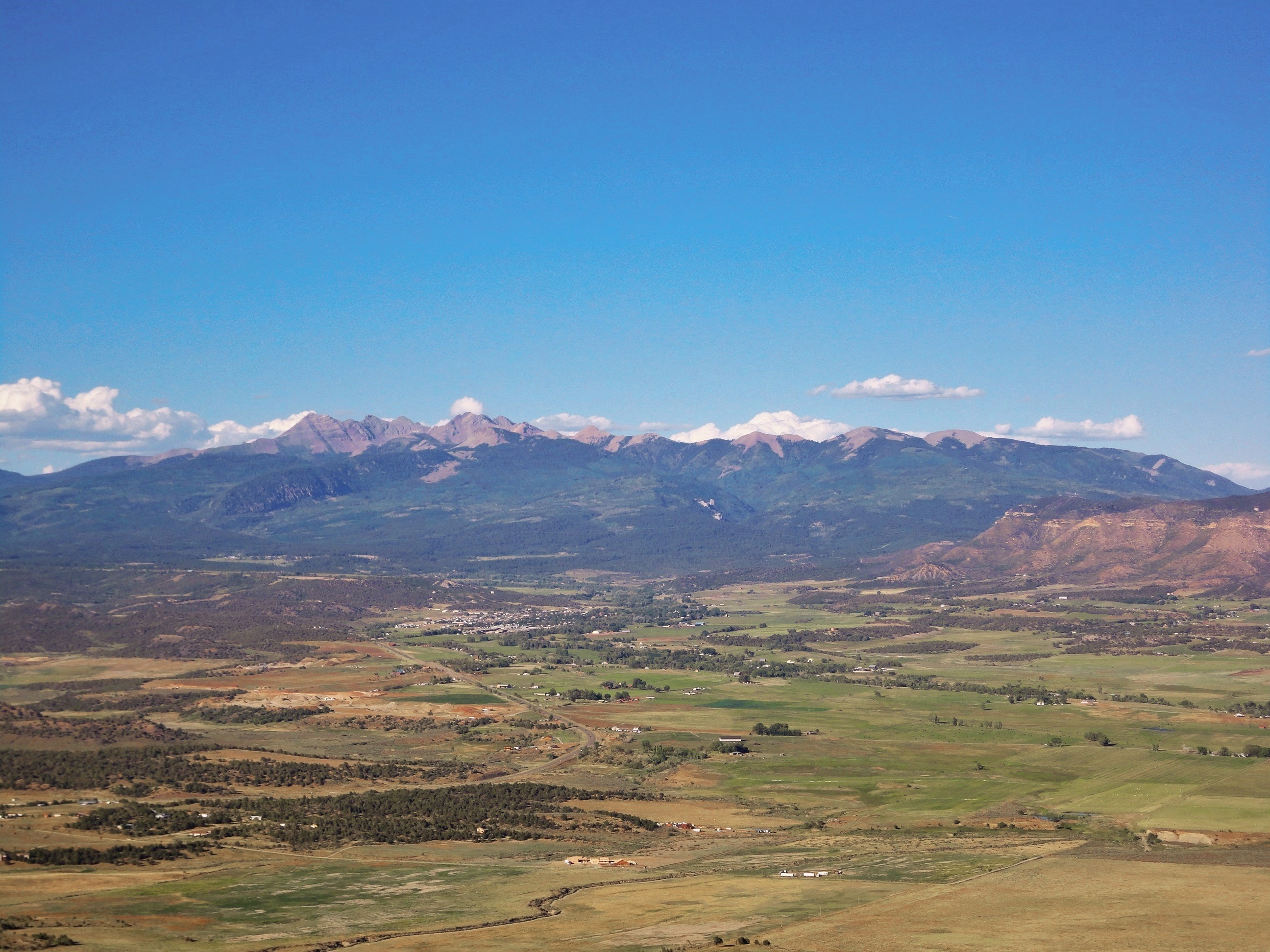
- From the Mancos Valley Overlook in Mesa Verde National Park

Highest point
- Peak: Hesperus Mountain
- Elevation: 13,232 ft (4,033 m)
- Coordinates: 37°27′6″N 108°0′41″W

Geography
- Country: United States
- State: Colorado
- Parent range: San Juan Mountains

The La Plata Mountains are a small subrange of the San Juan Mountains in the southwestern part of Colorado, United States. They are located on the border between Montezuma and La Plata counties, about 12 miles (19 km) northwest of Durango. Their name is Spanish for silver.

The peaks of the range are easily visible from U.S. Route 160, which skirts the range on the south. The La Plata River and the Mancos River have their headwaters in the range. The Colorado Trail accesses even towards the northern peaks.

The best-known and highest peak in the La Plata Mountains is Hesperus Mountain, which is the Navajo sacred mountain of the north. The seven highest summits are listed below.

== Seven highest peaks ==
- Hesperus Mountain, 13,232 ft (4,033 m)
- Lavender Peak, 13,228 ft (4,032 m)
- Mount Moss, 13,192 ft (4,021 m)
- Babcock Peak, 13,180 ft (4,017 m)
- Spiller Peak, 13,123 ft (4,000 m)
- Centennial Peak, 13,062 ft (3,981 m)
- Diorite Peak, 12,761 ft (3,890 m)

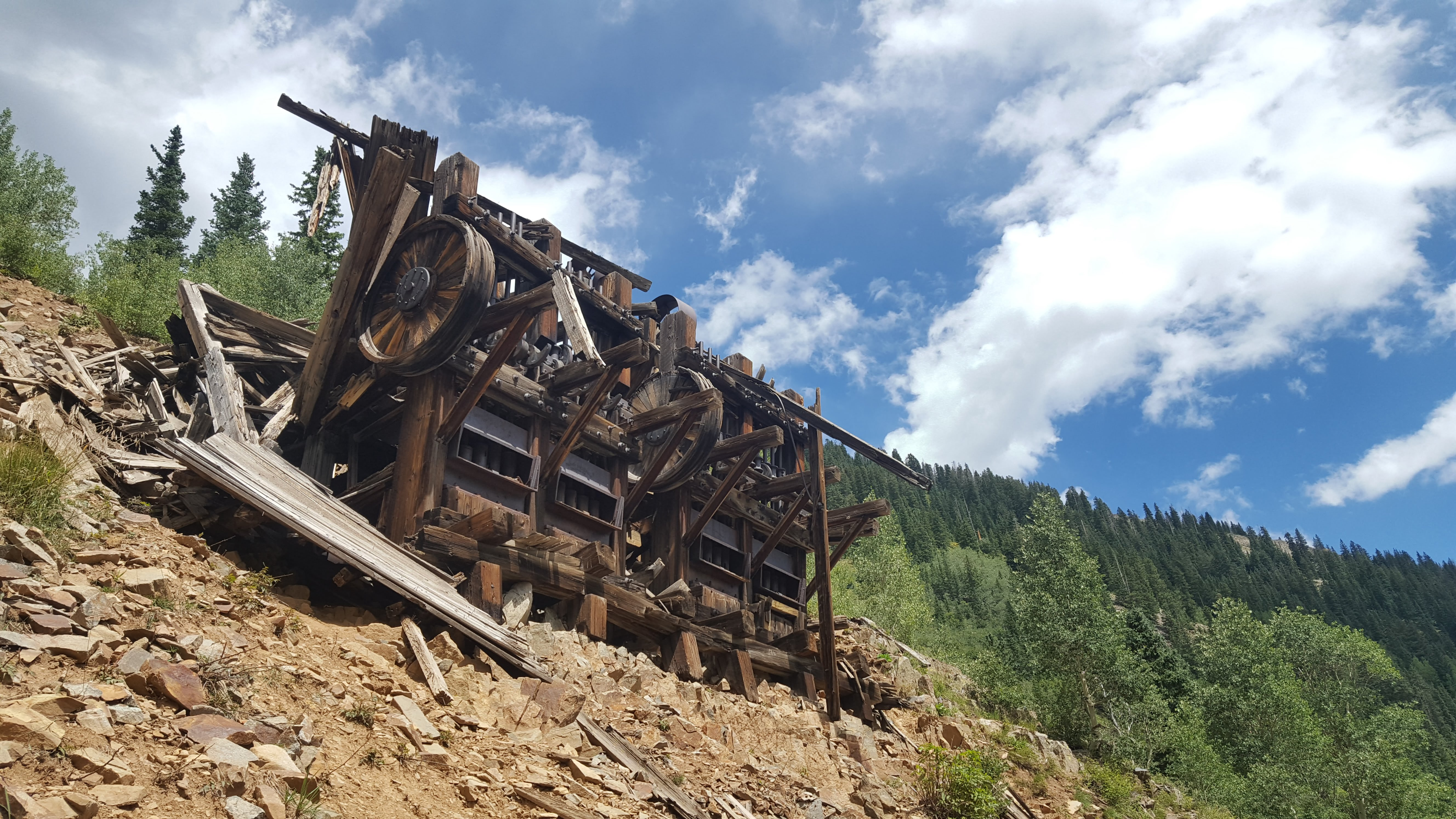
The Tomahawk Mill in La Plata Canyon, Colorado

== See also ==
- Mountain ranges of Colorado
