= Hesperus Mountain (Colorado) =

Mountain in Colorado, United States

- Dibé Ntsaa (in Navajo)
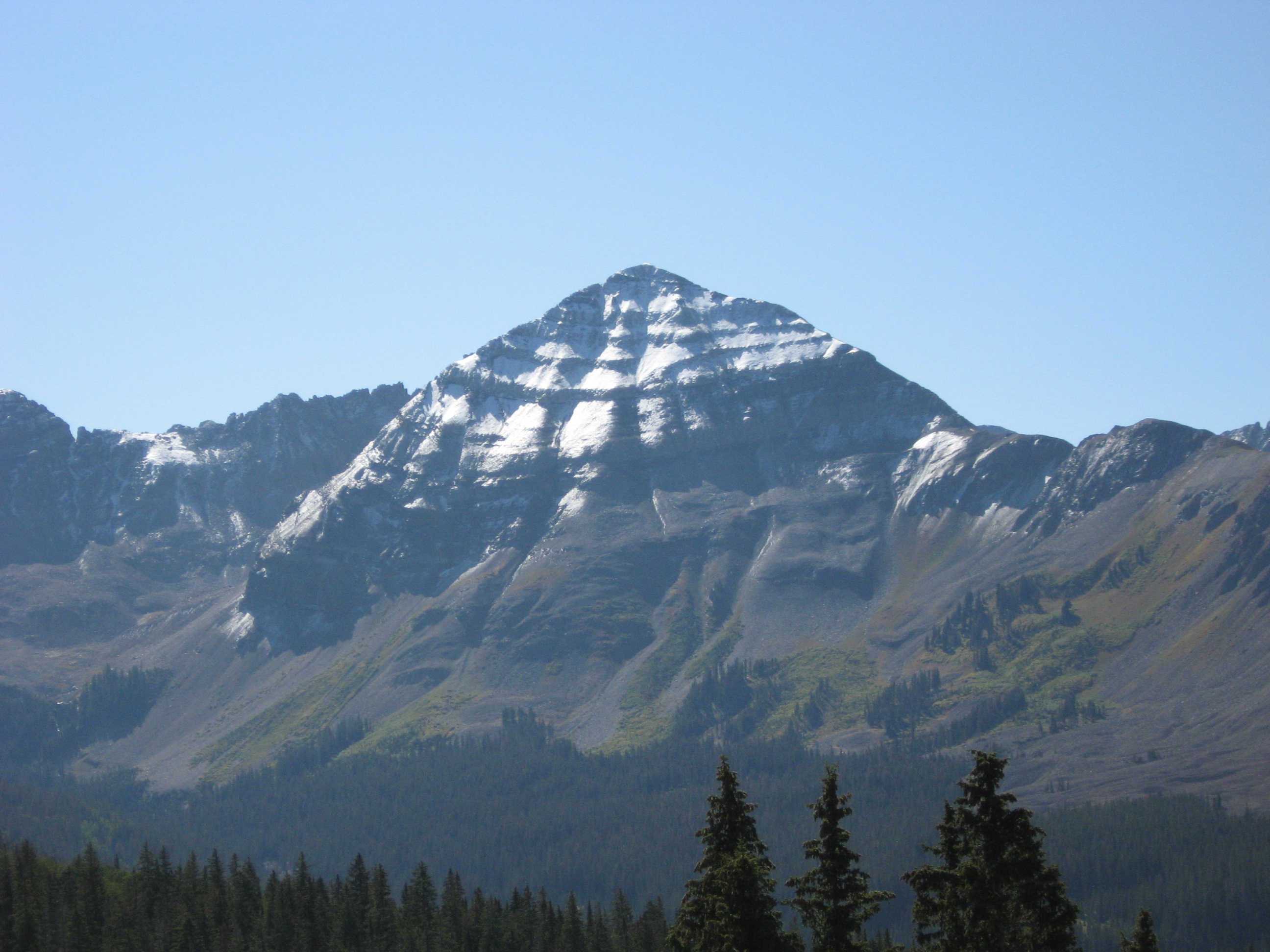
- Hesperus Mountain

Highest point
- Elevation: 13,237 ft (4,035 m)
- Prominence: 2,852 ft (869 m)
- Isolation: 24.53 mi (39.48 km)
- Listing: North America highest peaks 110th; US highest major peaks 91st; Colorado highest major peaks 50th; Colorado county high points 28th
- Coordinates: 37°26′42″N 108°05′20″W

Geography
- Location within Colorado
- Location: High point of Montezuma County, Colorado, United States
- Parent range: Highest summit of the La Plata Mountains
- Topo map(s): USGS 7.5' topographic map La Plata, Colorado

Climbing
- Easiest route: Scramble

Hesperus Mountain (Navajo: Dibé Ntsaa meaning "Big Mountain Sheep") is the highest summit of the La Plata Mountains range of the Rocky Mountains of North America. The prominent 13,237-foot (4,035 m) thirteener is located in San Juan National Forest, 13.2 miles (21.2 km) northeast by east (bearing 59°) of the Town of Mancos in Montezuma County, Colorado, United States. The summit of Hesperus Mountain is the highest point in Montezuma County.

== Mountain ==
Though not of particularly high elevation for the region, Hesperus Mountain is visually quite prominent, as it is near the southern edge of the San Juan Mountains and rises over 7,000 ft (2,100 m) above the area.

Hesperus is notable as the Navajo People's Sacred Mountain of the North, Dibé Ntsaa, which marks the northern boundary of the Dinetah, their traditional homeland. It is associated with the color black, and is said to be impregnated with jet. When First Man created the mountain as a replica of mountains in the Fourth World, he fastened it to the ground with a rainbow and covered it in darkness.

The San Juan Mountains have been the traditional homeland of the Ute People.

Along with Ute the La Plata Mountain Range has also been the early homeland of the Navajo People who had settled on and near this mountain and the La Plata Mountain Range.

== Gallery ==
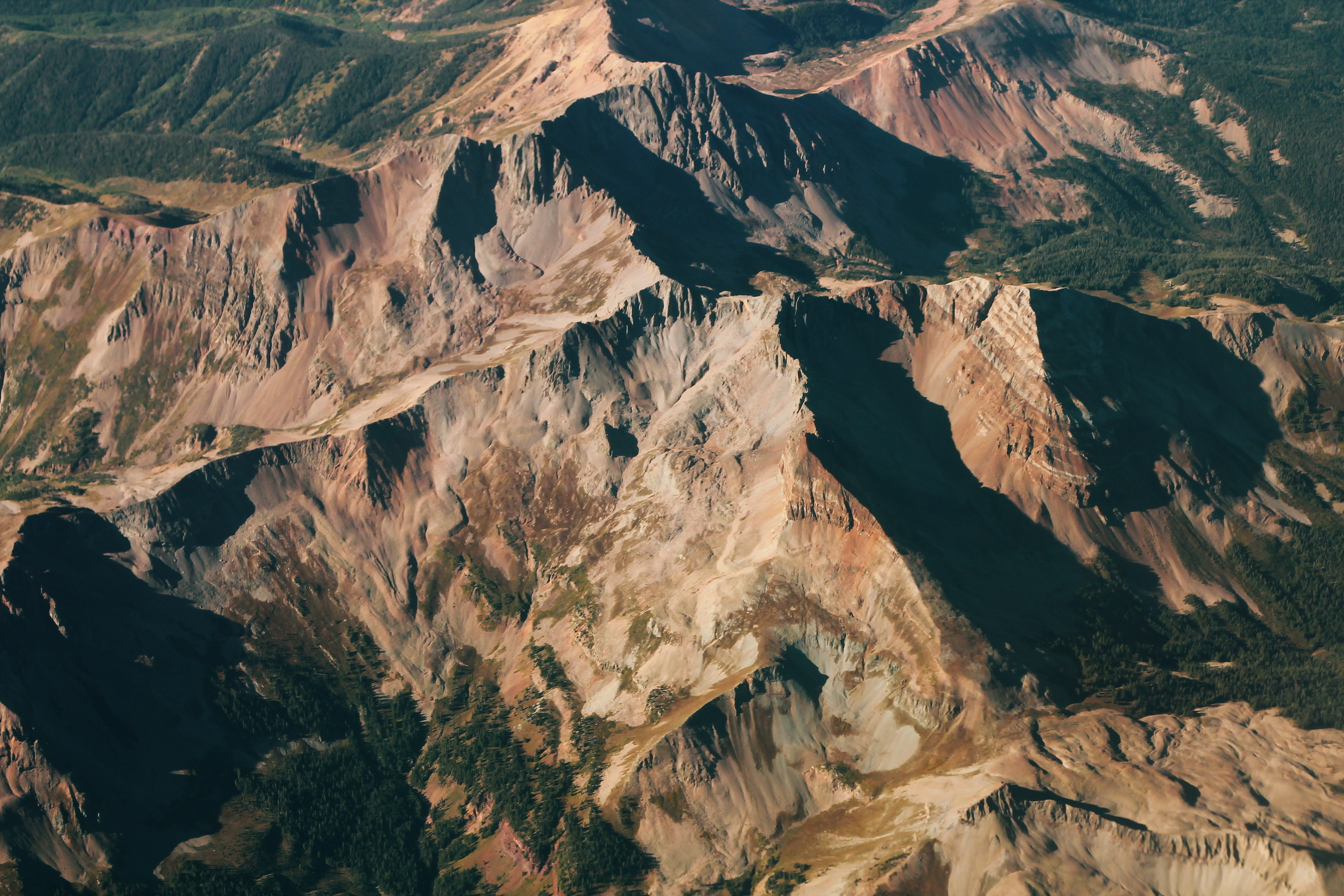
Aerial view of the mountain

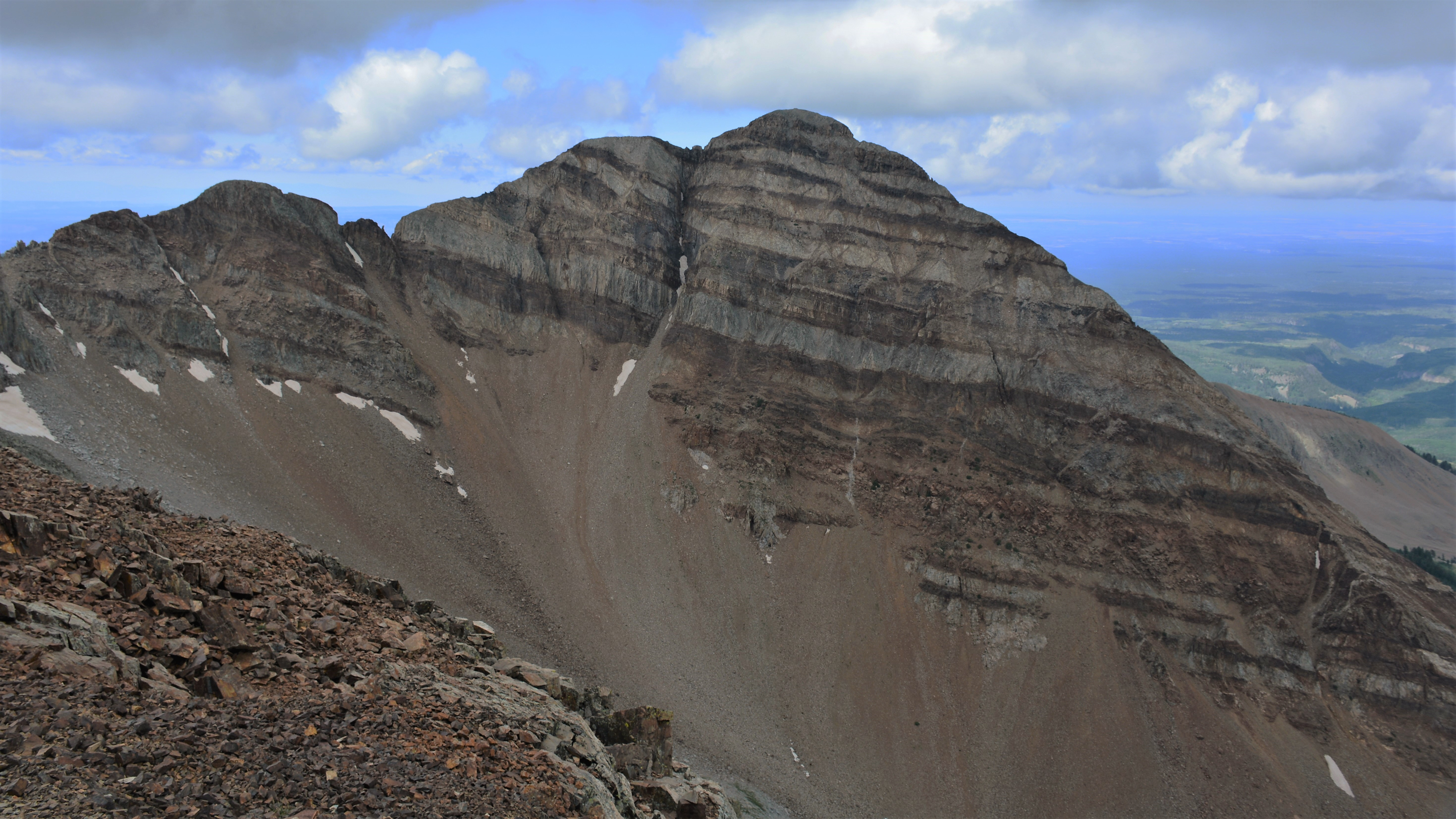
Hesperus seen from Centennial Peak

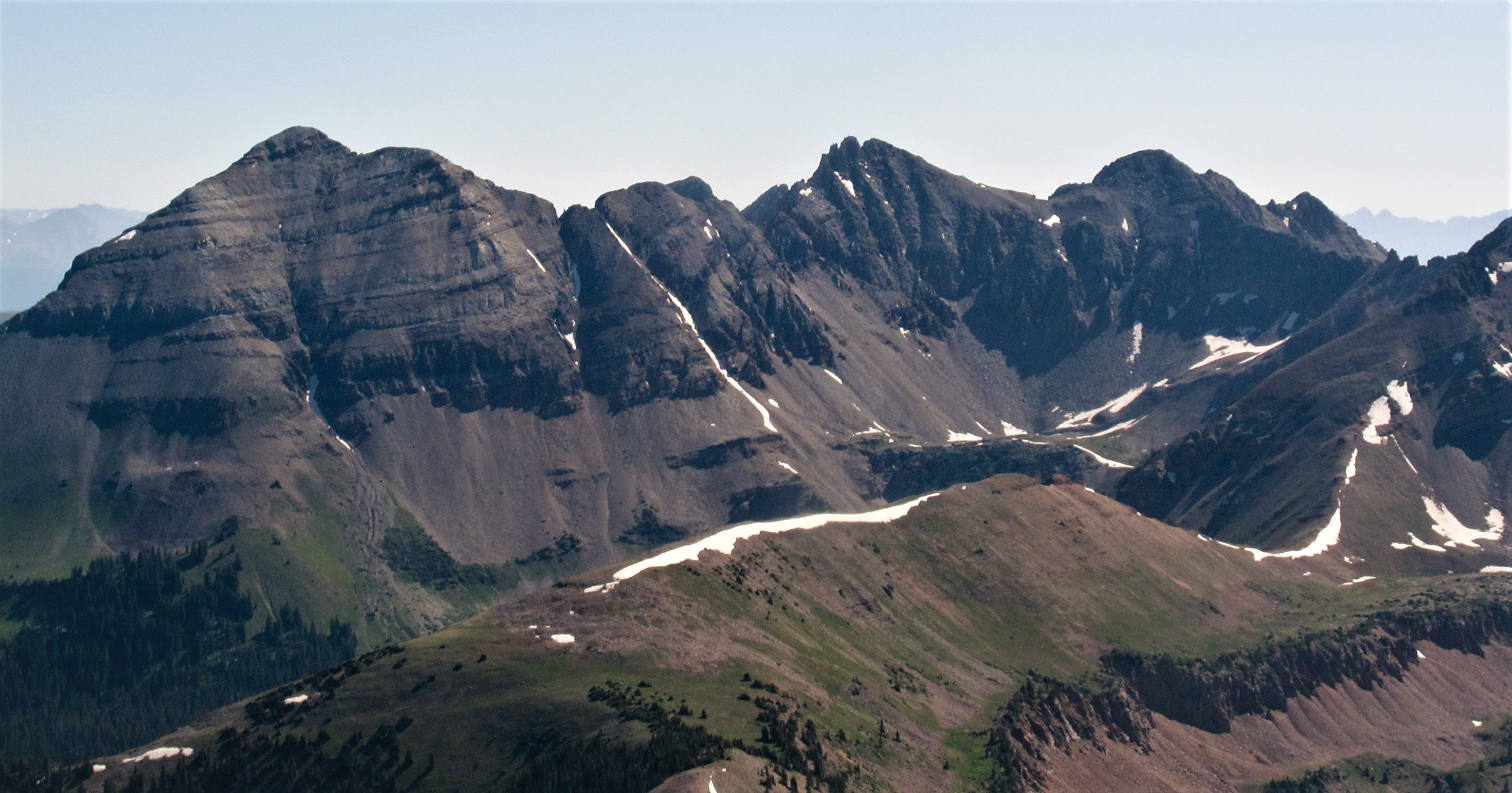
Aerial from west: Hesperus, Lavender, Moss

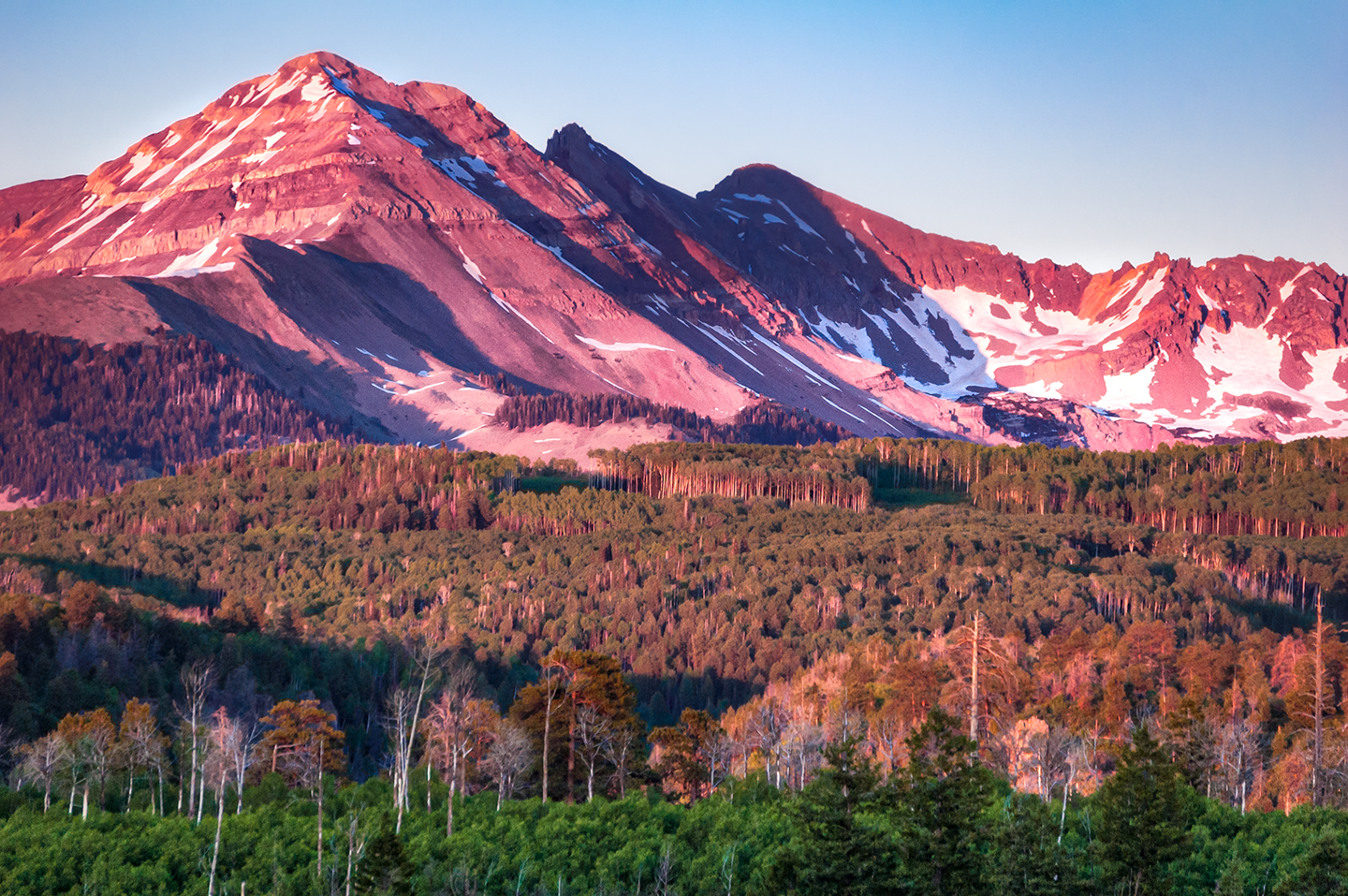
Hesperus Mountain (left) and Mount Moss (center) from the west at sunset

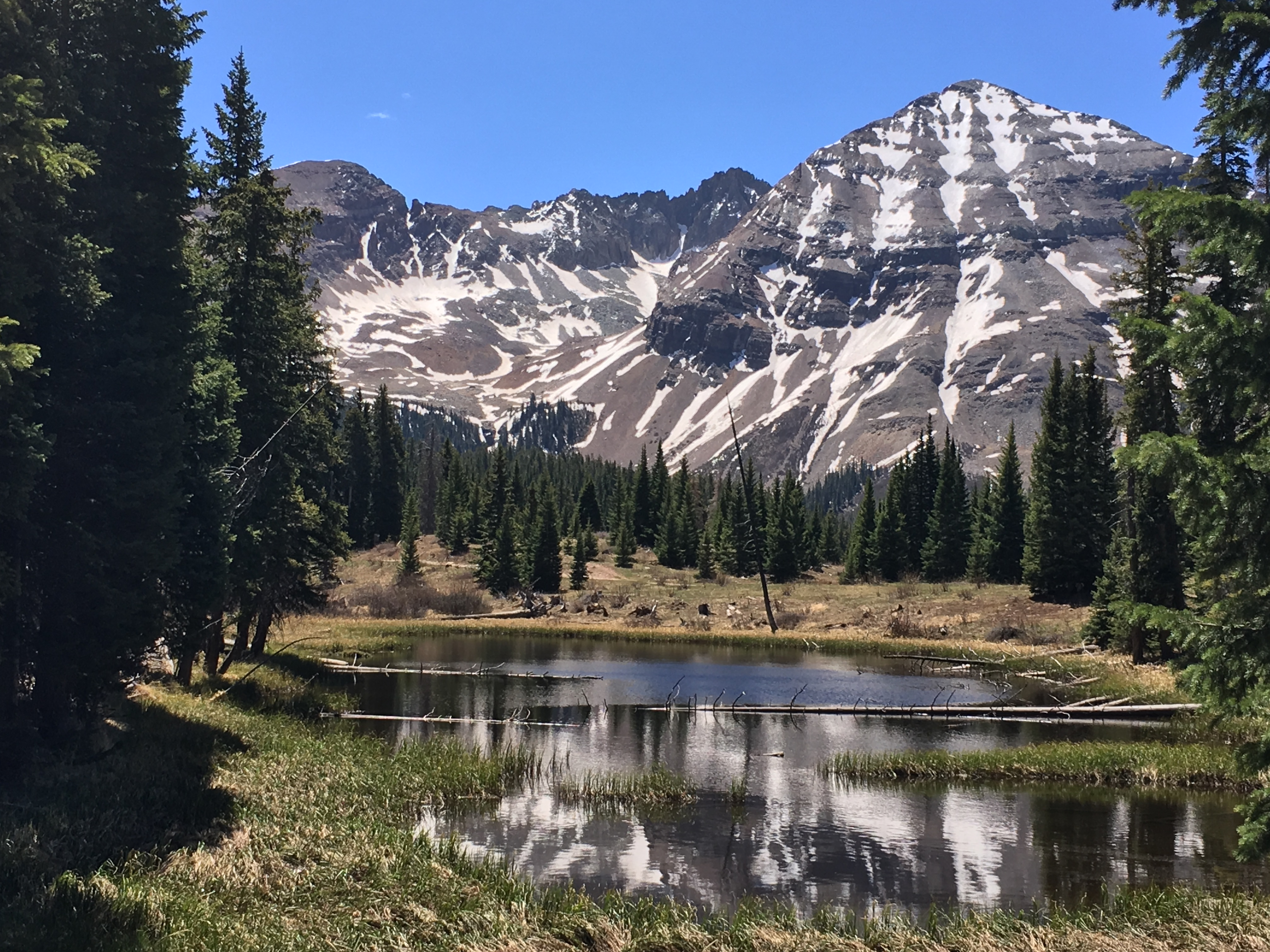
Hesperus Mountain in Spring

== See also ==
- List of mountain peaks of Colorado
- List of Colorado county high points
- San Juan Mountains (Colorado)
