= La Plata River (San Juan River tributary) =

River in Colorado and New Mexico in the United States

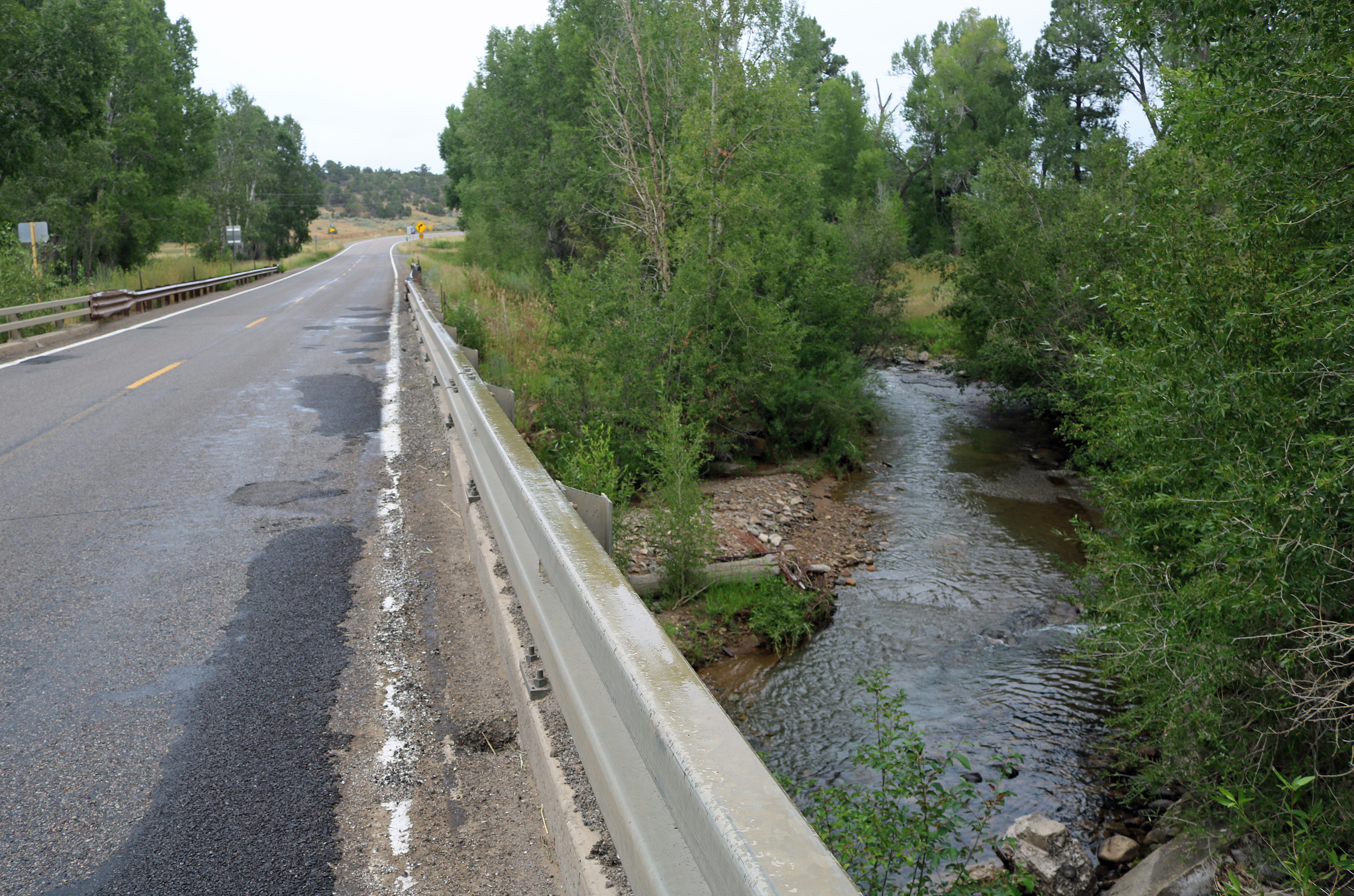
- The river as it passes under Colorado State Highway 140 near Breen

Physical characteristics
- Source
  - coordinates: 37°27′23″N 108°02′04″W
- Mouth
  - location: Confluence with San Juan
  - coordinates: 36°44′10″N 108°15′06″W
  - elevation: 5,213 ft (1,589 m)

Basin features
- Progression: San Juan—Colorado

La Plata River (Navajo: Tsé Dogoi Ńlíní) is a 70-mile-long (110 km) tributary to the San Juan River in La Plata County, Colorado, and San Juan County, New Mexico, in the United States. This small river heads at the western foot of Snow Storm Peak in the La Plata Mountains of southwestern Colorado, approximately 35 miles (56 km) north of the New Mexico state line. It flows in a southerly direction until it joins the San Juan at the western edge of the city of Farmington, New Mexico, about 19 miles (31 km) south of the Colorado state line.

The Navajo name for the river, Tsé Dogoi Nlini translates as "flowing over projecting rock".

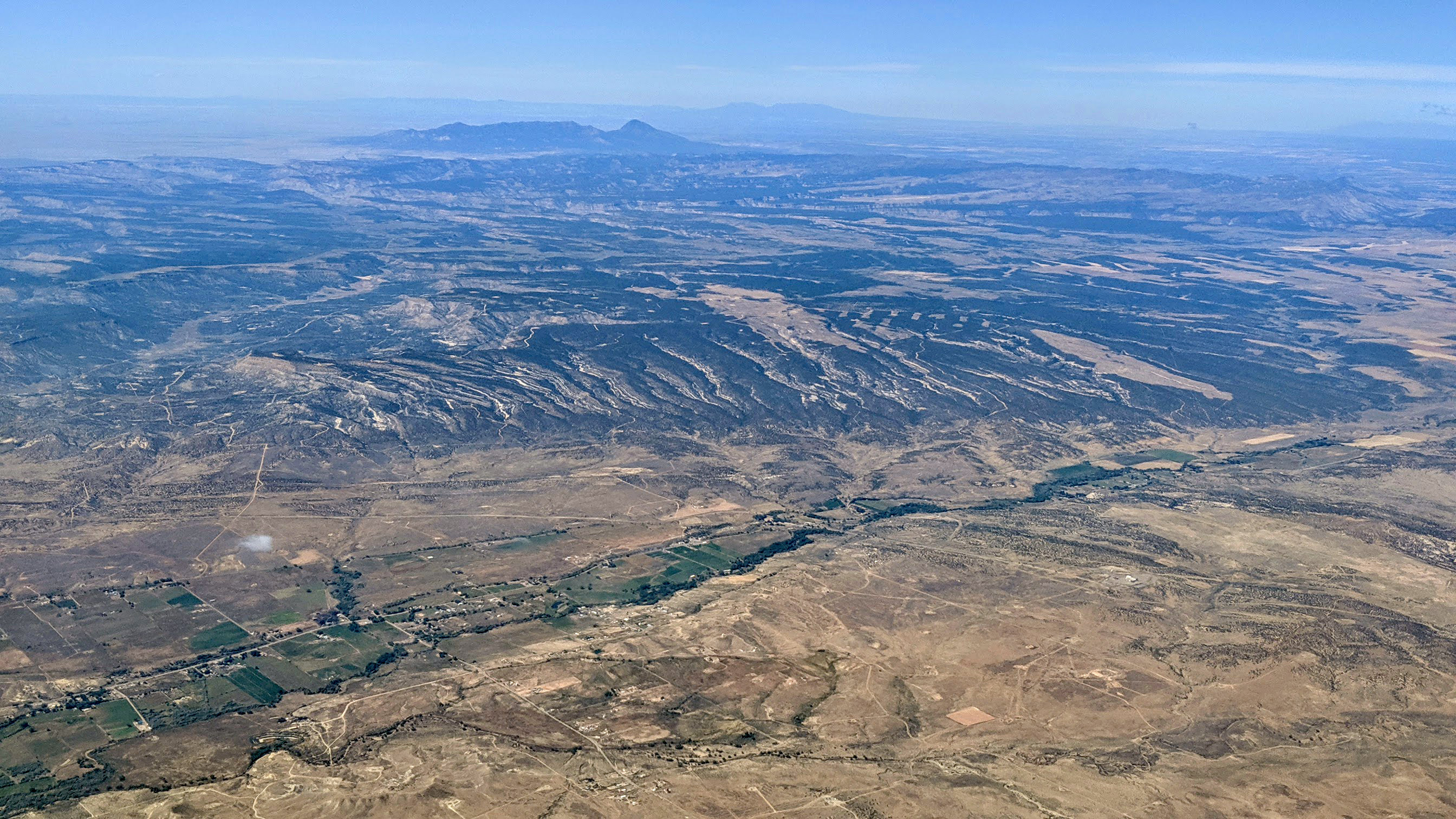
Aerial view of the La Plata crossing into New Mexico from Colorado, with La Plata, New Mexico, in left foreground. Mesa Verde is in the right background. Further, at about 40 miles, just left of center, is Colorado's Ute Mountain. Between the mesa and the sleeping Ute is Navajo Wash, extending to the left toward its confluence with the Mancos River. Even further, at about 100 miles (160 km), the Abajo Mountains, in Utah, are visible on the horizon.

== See also ==
- List of rivers of Colorado
- List of rivers of New Mexico
- List of tributaries of the Colorado River
