= Lavender Peak (Colorado) =

Mountain in the La Plata Mountains

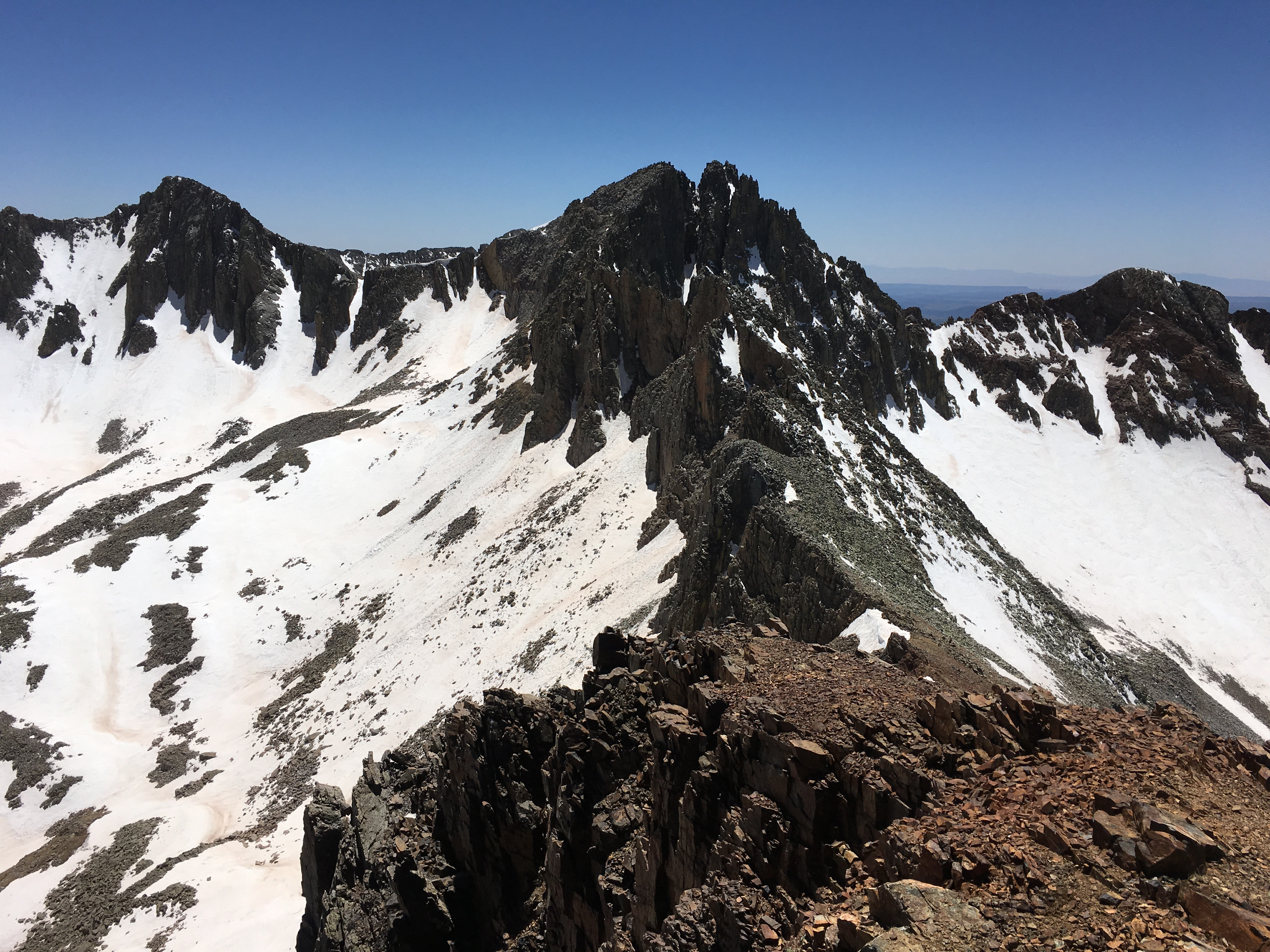
- Lavender Peak in spring

Highest point
- Elevation: 13,233 ft (4,033 m)
- Prominence: 408 ft (124 m)
- Parent peak: Hesperus Mountain
- Isolation: 0.50 mi (0.80 km)
- Coordinates: 37°26′30″N 108°04′49″W

Geography
- Location within Colorado
- Location: Montezuma County, Colorado, United States
- Parent range: La Plata Mountains
- Topo map(s): USGS 7.5' topographic map La Plata, Colorado

Climbing
- Easiest route: Scramble

Lavender Peak is a high mountain summit in the La Plata Mountains range of the Rocky Mountains of North America. The 13,233-foot (4,033 m) thirteener is located in San Juan National Forest, 13.5 miles (21.7 km) northeast by east (bearing 61°) of the Town of Mancos in Montezuma County, Colorado, United States. The peak lies 0.53 miles (0.85 km) east-southeast of the higher and more well-known Hesperus Mountain. Lavender Peak was named in honor of Dwight Garrigues Lavender (1911-1934), the author of a 1932 climbing guide to the San Juan Mountains.

== Historical names ==
- Lavendar Peak
- Lavender Peak – 1976

== See also ==
- List of Colorado mountain ranges
- List of Colorado mountain summits
  - List of Colorado fourteeners
  - List of Colorado 4000 meter prominent summits
  - List of the most prominent summits of Colorado
- List of Colorado county high points
