= Mancos River =

Tributary of the San Juan River in New Mexico

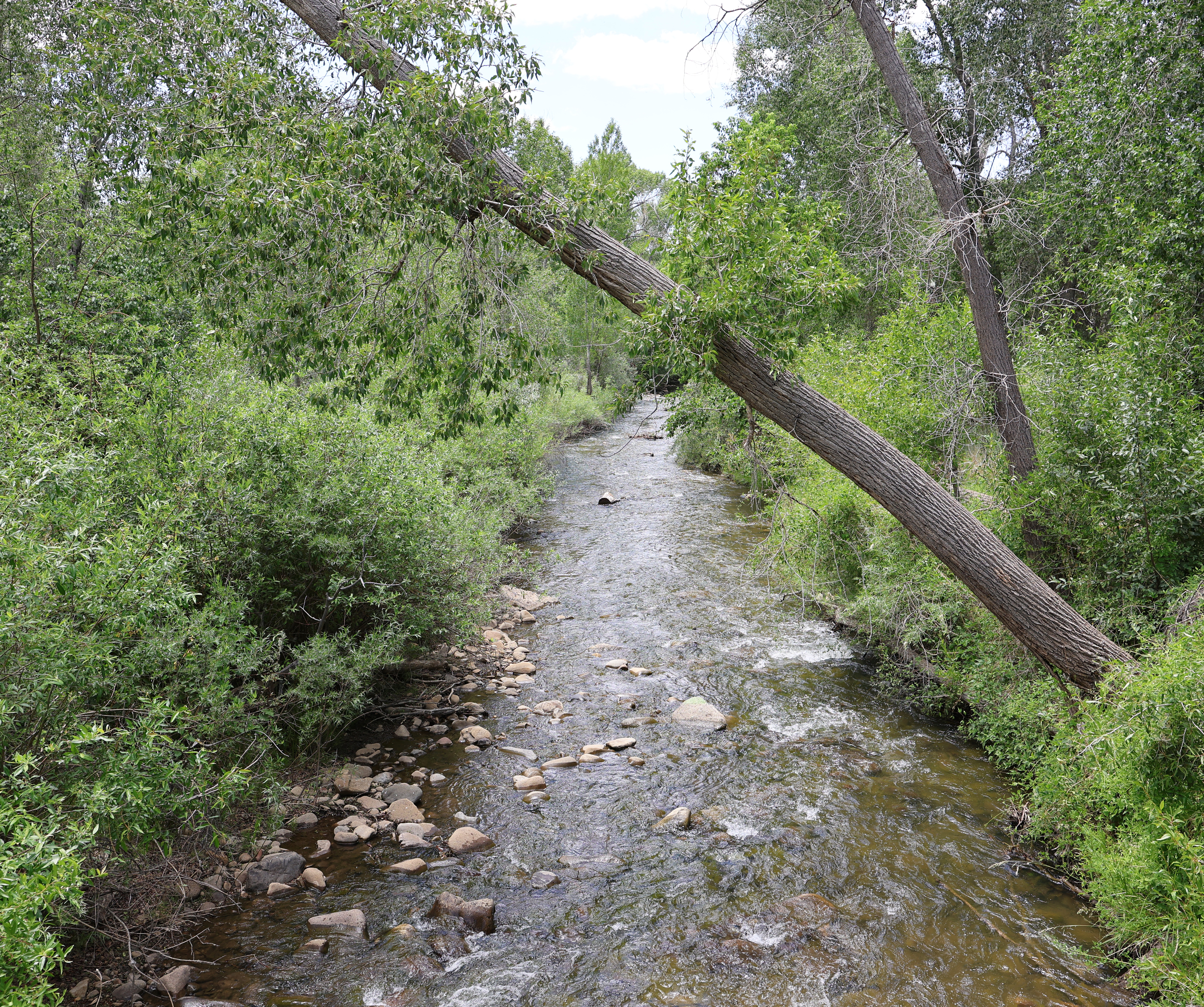
- The river in downtown Mancos

Physical characteristics
- Source
  - location: Confluence of West Mancos River and East Mancos River
  - coordinates: 37°21′30″N 108°15′12″W
- Mouth
  - location: Confluence with San Juan
  - coordinates: 36°59′00″N 108°58′50″W
  - elevation: 4,639 ft (1,414 m)

Basin features
- Progression: San Juan—Colorado

The Mancos River, formerly also El Rio de San Lazaro, is an 85.4-mile-long (137.4 km) northeast tributary of the San Juan River. It flows from the confluence of West Mancos River and East Mancos River near Mancos, Colorado, and joins the San Juan near Four Corners Monument in New Mexico.

The river was named after an incident during which a horse rider hurt his hand while crossing, the word Mancos being derived from Spanish meaning "one-armed".

== See also ==
- List of rivers of Colorado
- List of rivers of New Mexico
- List of tributaries of the Colorado River
