= Stagecoach (disambiguation) =

A stagecoach is a four-wheeled horse-drawn transport.

Stagecoach may also refer to:

== Places in the United States ==
- Stagecoach, Colorado, a short-lived ski resort
- Stagecoach, Nevada, an unincorporated community
- Stagecoach, Texas, a town
- Stagecoach Dam, on the Yampa river in Colorado
- Stagecoach State Park, Colorado
- Stagecoach State Recreation Area, Nebraska
- Stagecoach (San Juan County, Utah), a butte in Monument Valley

== Film and television ==
- Stagecoach (1939 film), a John Ford film starring John Wayne
- Stagecoach (1966 film), a remake of the 1939 film
- Stagecoach (1986 film), a television remake of the 1939 film
- Stagecoach: The Texas Jack Story, a 2016 Canadian Western

== Music ==
- Stagecoach (band), a band from London, England
- Stagecoach Ballroom, a honky-tonk venue in Fort Worth, Texas
- Stagecoach Festival, an annual country music festival held in Indio, California, U.S.

== Other uses ==
- Stagecoach Fire, an August 2020, wildfire in Kern County, California
- Stagecoach Group, a transport operator based in Perth, Scotland, UK
- Stagecoach Hotel & Casino, in Beatty, Nevada, U.S.
- Stagecoach Inn (disambiguation)
- Stagecoach Theatre Arts, a theatre arts school, headquartered in Walton-on-Thames, England, UK
- Stagecoach Trail, a road in Illinois, U.S.
- Mary Fields (c. 1832–1914), nicknamed "Stagecoach", first African-American woman star route mail carrier

== See also ==
- Stagecoach Express (disambiguation)
- Acting coach or stage coach, a stage acting instructor
