= Stagecoach, Colorado =

Stagecoach
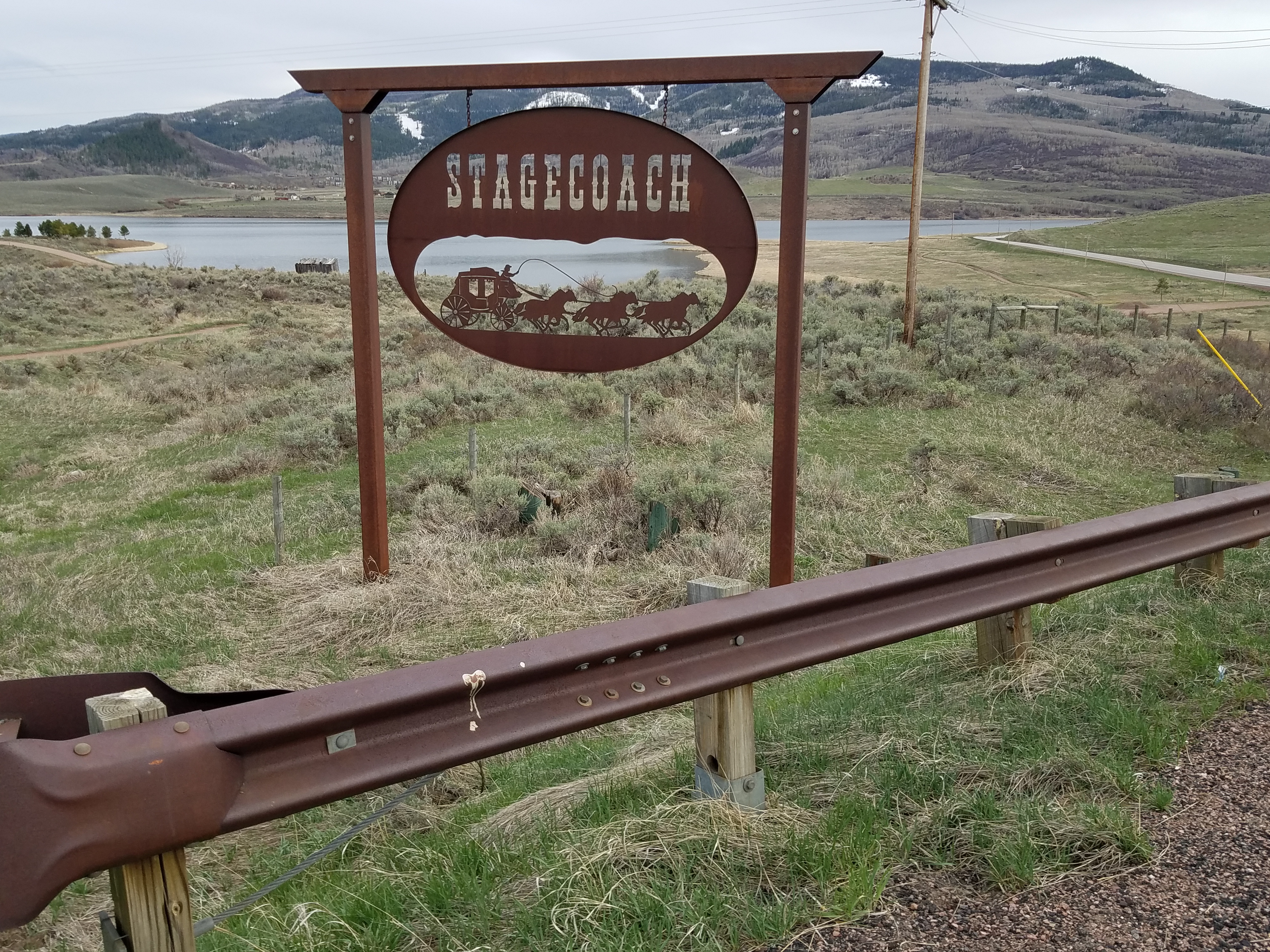
- Stagecoach road sign near Stagecoach Reservoir, viewed from County Road 14

- Location in Colorado
- Location: Routt County, Colorado; United States
- Nearest city: Steamboat Springs
- Coordinates: 40°15′10″N 106°51′25″W
- Vertical: 1,700 ft (518 m)
- Top elevation: 9,150 ft (2,789 m)
- Base elevation: 7,450 ft (2,271 m)
- Skiable area: 170 acres (0.7 km^{2})
- Lift system: 3 double chairlifts
- Snowfall: 300 in (760 cm)

Stagecoach was a short-lived ski resort in Colorado in the early 1970s, located 20 miles (32 km) south of Steamboat Springs in Routt County.

== Ski area ==
The ski area was developed by the Woodmoor Company of Colorado Springs. Although full of great terrain on north-facing slopes, financial problems of the developer nixed the project in 1973 and it closed after its second season of skiing in 1974.

Now considered a "lost" ski hill, rumors of Stagecoach reopening are common, but are always denied by the Wittemyer family, who have owned the property for over twenty-five years.

The ski area was a mile south of the present-day Stagecoach Reservoir, with north-facing slopes and three double chairlifts. The vertical drop was 1,700 feet (518 m) with a summit elevation of 9,150 feet (2,789 m) above sea level and the base at 7,450 feet (2,271 m)

=== Chairlifts ===
#	Lift Name	Vertical Drop	Length	Type	Ride Time	Hourly Capacity	Gradient	Year
1	Big Hitch	1,250 ft (381 m)	5,385 ft (1,641 m)	Double	10 min	1,200	23.2% (13.1 deg.)	1972
2	Yellow Jacket Express	570 ft (174 m)	2,000 ft (610 m)	Double	5 min	1,200	28.5% (15.9 deg.)	1972
3	Little Hitch	347 ft (106 m)	1,990 ft (607 m)	Double	6 min	1,100	17.4% (9.9 deg.)	1972

== Stagecoach State Park ==
The Stagecoach Dam was built on the Yampa River in late 1988, and its reservoir filled over the next several years. The reservoir now hosts Stagecoach State Park and offers fishing, boating, camping, hiking, and winter cross-country skiing and dog-sledding. The dam is at the northeast end of the reservoir; the water's surface elevation is 7,200 feet (2,195 m) above sea level. Originally designed in the 1970s as an earthen dam, it is a roller-compacted concrete (RCC) structure.

== Community ==
The community is now quickly growing, along with nearby Steamboat Springs. A new firehouse was built in 2006 and new neighborhoods are under development. An elementary school site has been allocated when the current facility in nearby Yampa reaches capacity.
