= North Fork Elk River =

Physical characteristics
- Source
  - coordinates: 40°49′55″N 106°41′23″W
- Mouth
  - location: Confluence with Middle Fork
  - coordinates: 40°46′11″N 106°46′27″W
  - elevation: 7,982 ft (2,433 m)

Basin features
- Progression: Elk—Yampa—Green—Colorado

North Fork Elk River, or North Fork Elk Creek is a 15.2-mile-long (24.5 km) tributary of the Elk River in Routt County, Colorado. It flows from a source on the northeast slopes of Big Agnes Mountain in the Mount Zirkel Wilderness to a confluence with the Middle Fork Elk River that forms the Elk River.

== See also ==
- List of rivers of Colorado
- List of tributaries of the Colorado River
