= Middle Fork Elk River =

Physical characteristics
- Source
  - location: Confluence with Gilpin Creek and Gold Creek
  - coordinates: 40°47′00″N 106°43′08″W
- Mouth
  - location: Confluence with North Fork
  - coordinates: 40°46′13″N 106°46′30″W
  - elevation: 8,012 ft (2,442 m)

Basin features
- Progression: Elk—Yampa—Green—Colorado

Middle Fork Elk River is a 3.5-mile-long (5.6 km) stream in Colorado. It flows from a confluence of Gilpin Creek and Gold Creek in Routt National Forest north of Steamboat Springs to a confluence with the North Fork Elk River that forms the Elk River.

== See also ==
- List of rivers of Colorado
- List of tributaries of the Colorado River
