= Echo Park (Colorado) =

Valley in Moffat County, Colorado, United States

Coordinates: 40°31′11.5″N 108°59′36.1″W

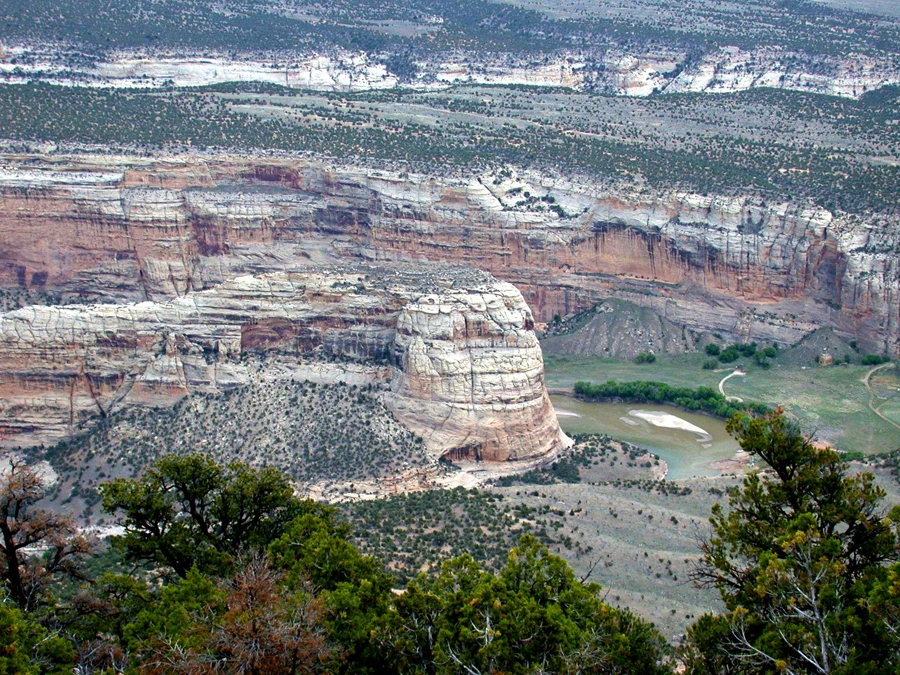
Steamboat Rock and Echo Park

Echo Park is a remote river bottom surrounded by canyon walls on the Green River, just downstream from the confluence with the Yampa River and across the stream from the dramatic southern end of Steamboat Rock in Dinosaur National Monument.

== Description ==
The valley was first mapped and given its name by the Powell Geographic Expedition in 1869. A proposed dam at Echo Park turned into a nationwide environmental controversy in the early 1950s. The Sierra Club and other conservationist groups helped forge a compromise in Congress that eliminated the Echo Park Dam from the Colorado River Storage Project Act of 1956.

== See also ==
- Dinosaur National Monument

== External references ==
- Echo Park at Dinosaur National Monument
