= Bear River (Colorado) =

River in Routt and Garfield counties in Colorado, United States

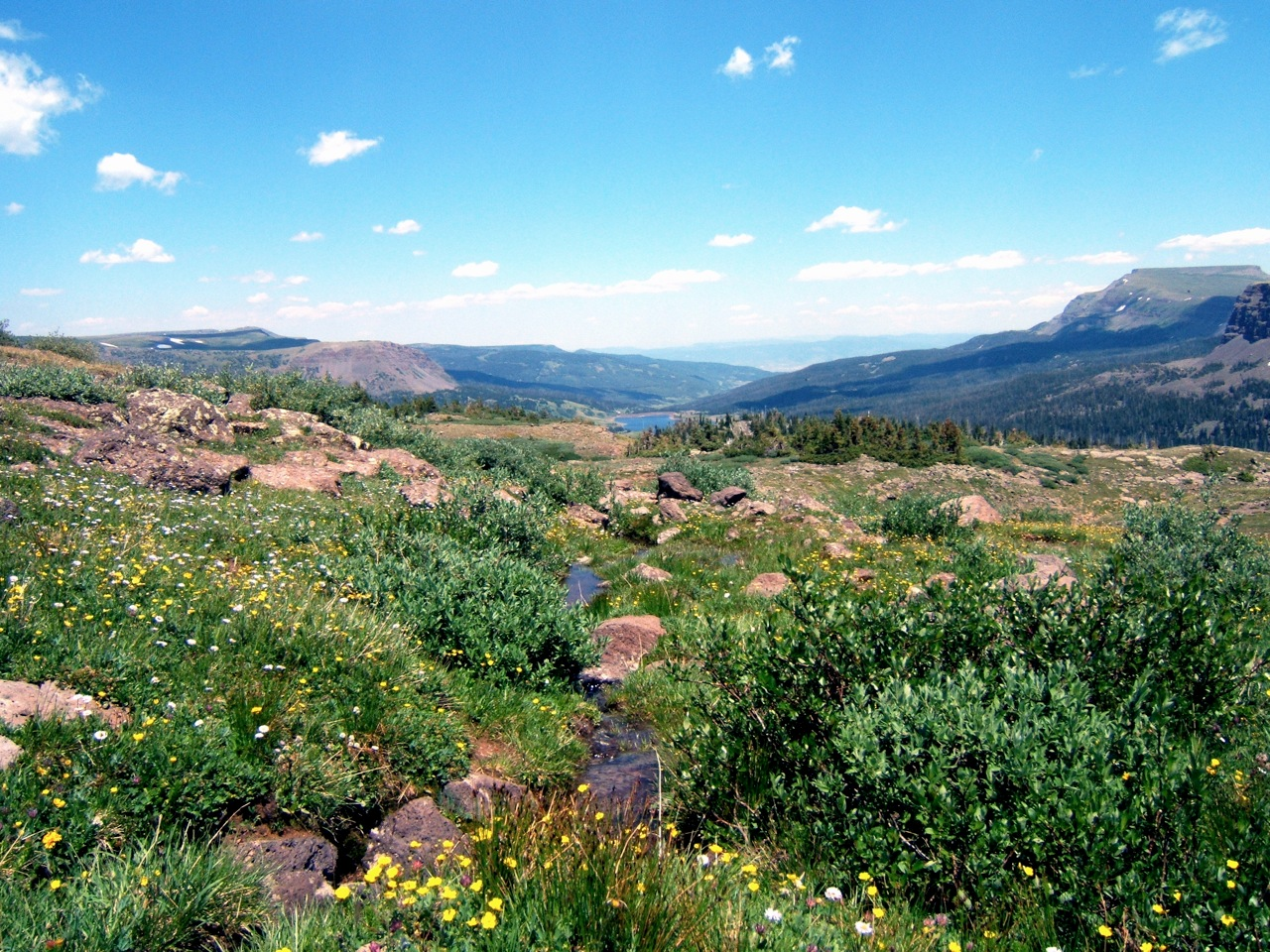
- Source of Bear River in Flat Tops Wilderness

Physical characteristics
- Source
  - coordinates: 39°58′42″N 107°09′57″W
- Mouth
  - location: Confluence with Yampa River
  - coordinates: 40°09′30″N 106°53′59″W

Basin features
- Progression: Yampa—Green—Colorado

The Bear River is a 22.7-mile-long (36.5 km) tributary of the Yampa River. Its source is in the Flat Tops Wilderness above Stillwater Reservoir in Garfield County, Colorado. The Bear River flows northeast into Routt County and joins the Yampa River just east of the town of Yampa.

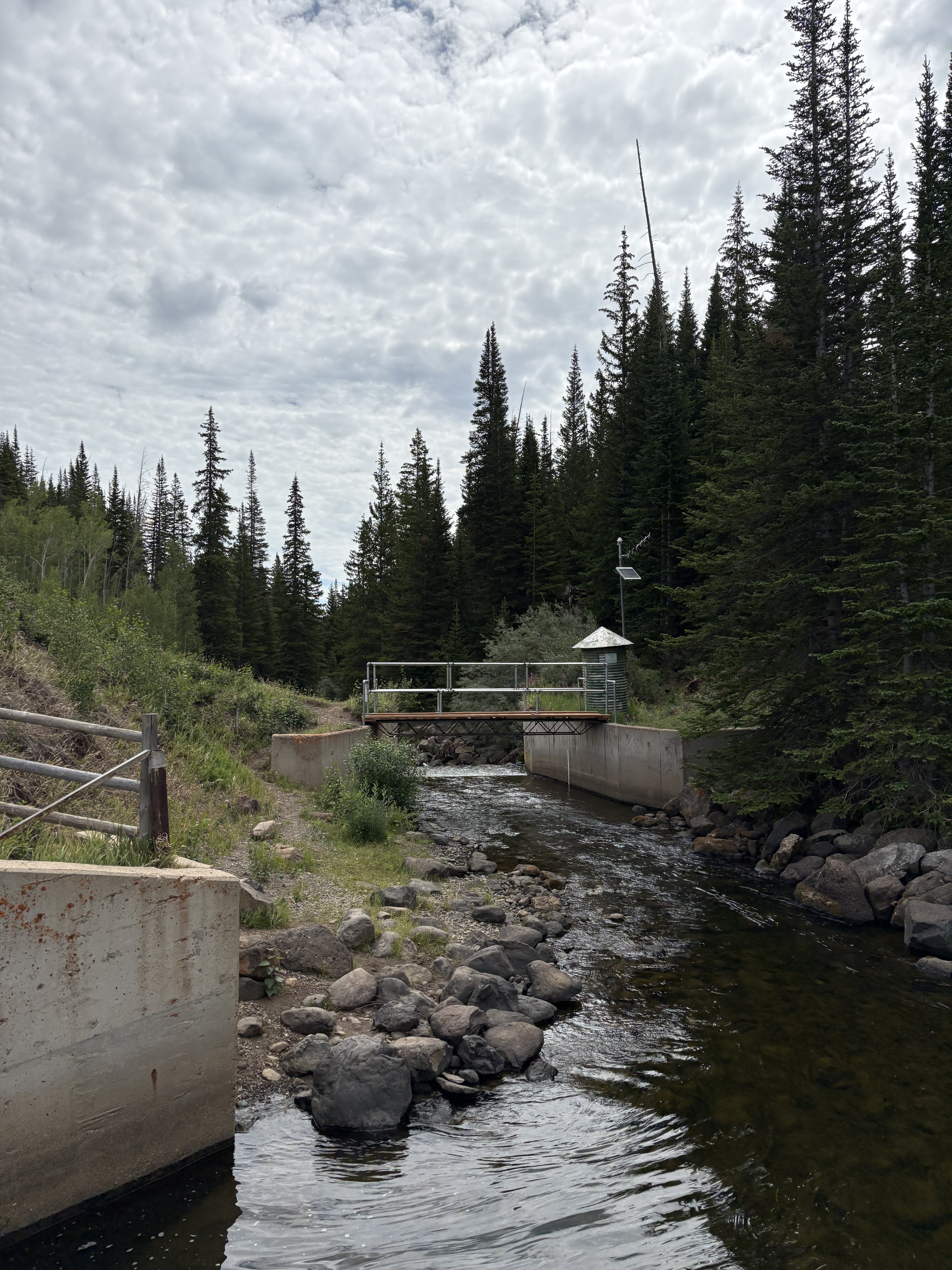
Hydrological station on Bear River and Upper Stillwater Reservoir in Colorado, USA.

== See also ==
- List of rivers of Colorado
- List of tributaries of the Colorado River
