= Stagecoach Inn =

A stagecoach inn is an inn traditionally serving stagecoach passengers.

Stagecoach Inn may also refer to:

- Stagecoach Inn (California), in Newbury Park, California
- Stage Coach Inn (Gibsland, Louisiana), listed on the National Register of Historic Places in Bienville Parish, Louisiana
- Stage Coach Inn (Lapeer, New York)
- Stagecoach Inn (Vermilion, Ohio), listed on the National Register of Historic Places in Erie County, Ohio
- Stagecoach Inn (Gruetli, Tennessee), listed on the National Register of Historic Places in Grundy County, Tennessee
- Stagecoach Inn of Chappell Hill, Texas
- Stagecoach Inn (Salado, Texas)
- Stagecoach Inn (Fairfield, Utah)
- Stagecoach Inn (Leicester, Vermont)
- Stagecoach Inn (Shelburne, Vermont)
