= Elk River (Colorado) =

Stream in Routt County, Colorado, United States

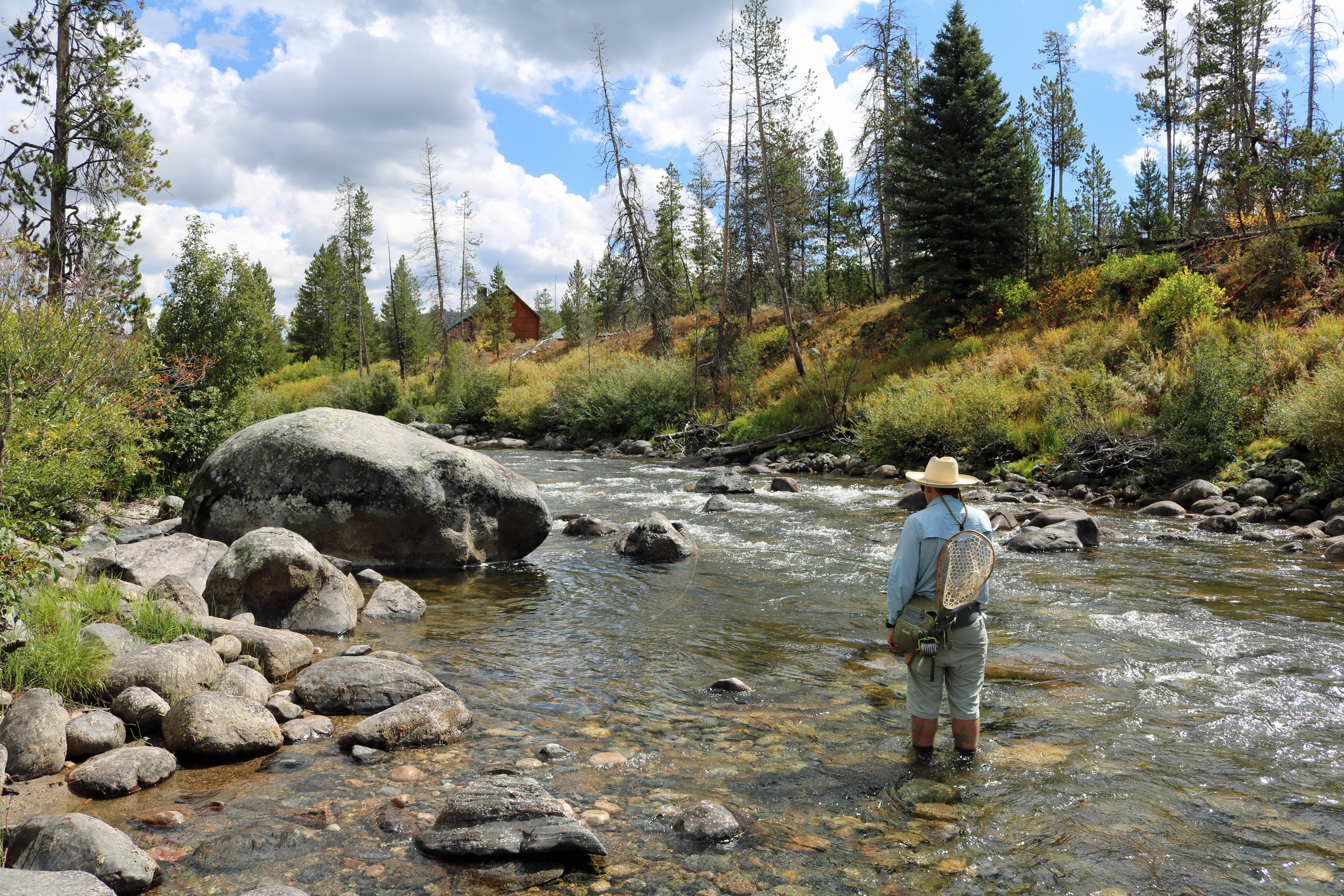
- A view of a fisherman in the river along Seedhouse Road, near Clark.

Physical characteristics
- Source
  - location: Confluence of North Fork and Middle Fork
  - coordinates: 40°46′11″N 106°46′29″W
- Mouth
  - location: Confluence with Yampa River
  - coordinates: 40°29′01″N 106°58′07″W
  - elevation: 6,539 ft (1,993 m)

Basin features
- Progression: Yampa—Green—Colorado

Elk River is a 34.2-mile-long (55.0 km) stream in Routt County, Colorado, United States. It flows from a confluence of the North Fork Elk River and Middle Fork Elk River in Routt National Forest north of Steamboat Springs to a confluence with the Yampa River.

== See also ==
- List of rivers of Colorado
- List of tributaries of the Colorado River
