= Steamboat Rock (Dinosaur National Monument) =

Ridge in Colorado, United States

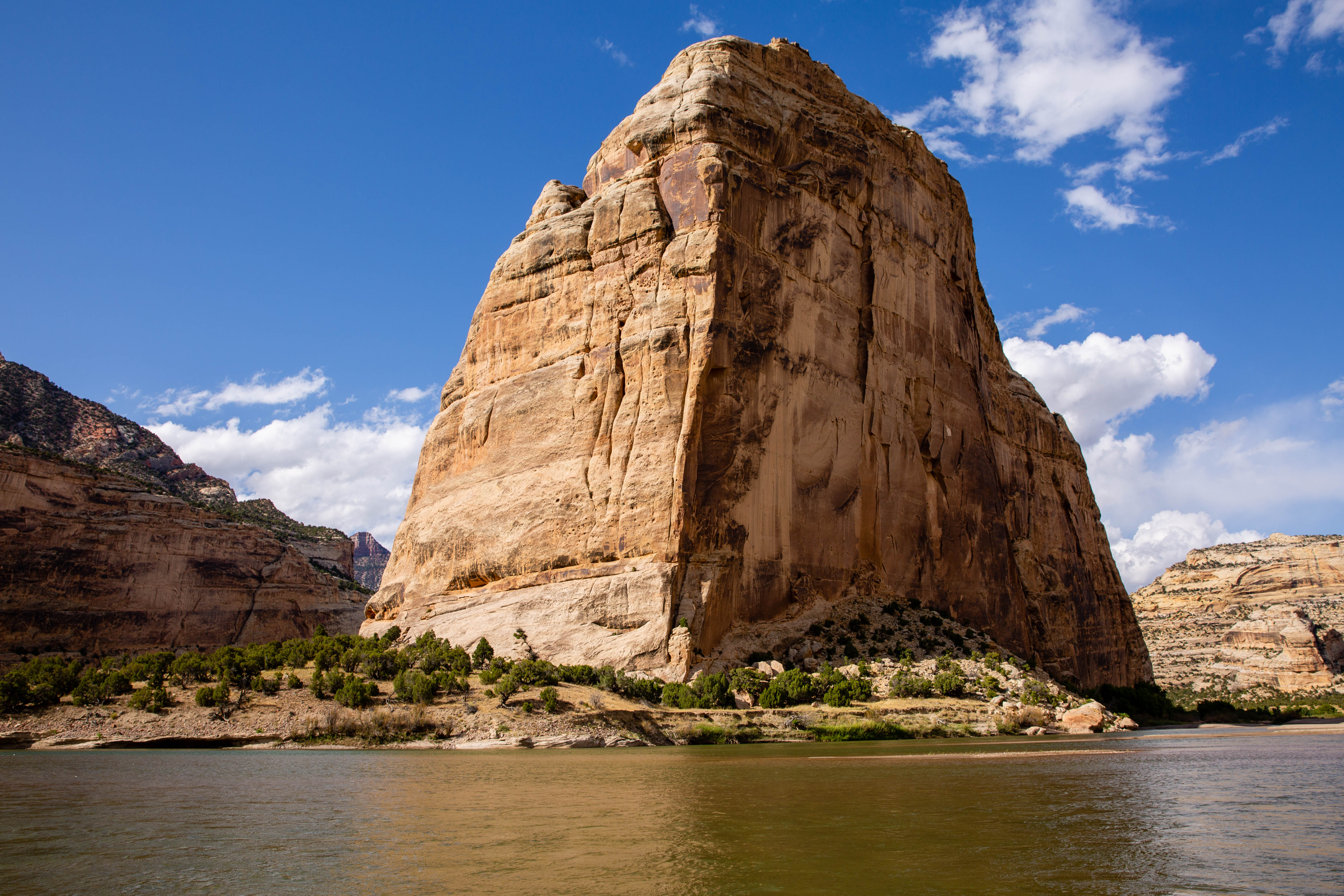
- Steamboat Rock, south aspect

Highest point
- Elevation: 6,074 ft (1,851 m)
- Prominence: 294 ft (90 m)
- Parent peak: Jenny Lind Rock
- Isolation: 0.9 mi (1.4 km)
- Coordinates: 40°32′06″N 108°59′12″W

Geography
- Location within Colorado Location within the United States
- Location: Dinosaur National Monument; Moffat County, Colorado, US
- Parent range: Uinta Mountains
- Topo map: USGS Canyon of Lodore South

Geology
- Rock age: Permian-Pennsylvanian
- Rock type: Weber Sandstone

Climbing
- Easiest route: class 5+ climbing

Steamboat Rock, reaching an elevation of 6,074 ft (1,851 m) is a promontory located in the eastern Uinta Mountains, in Moffat County of northwest Colorado, United States. This iconic landmark of Dinosaur National Monument is situated at the confluence of the Green River and Yampa River. Precipitation runoff from this feature drains into the Green River. This geographical formation was originally named "Echo Rock" in John Wesley Powell's 1875 report, The Exploration of the Colorado River and Its Canyons. The Steamboat name first appeared on a 1941 United States Geological Survey map of Dinosaur National Monument. The area around it still retains the Echo Park name applied by Powell during the Powell Geographic Expedition of 1869.

== Geology ==
Steamboat Rock is a mile-long, 1,000-ft high, slender peninsular ridge within a meander of the Green River. It is composed almost entirely of Permian-Pennsylvanian Weber Sandstone, with a thin layer of Park City Formation caprock. It is located where the river exits Lodore Canyon and enters Echo Park. The river drops 15 feet as it courses around Steamboat Rock.

== Gallery ==
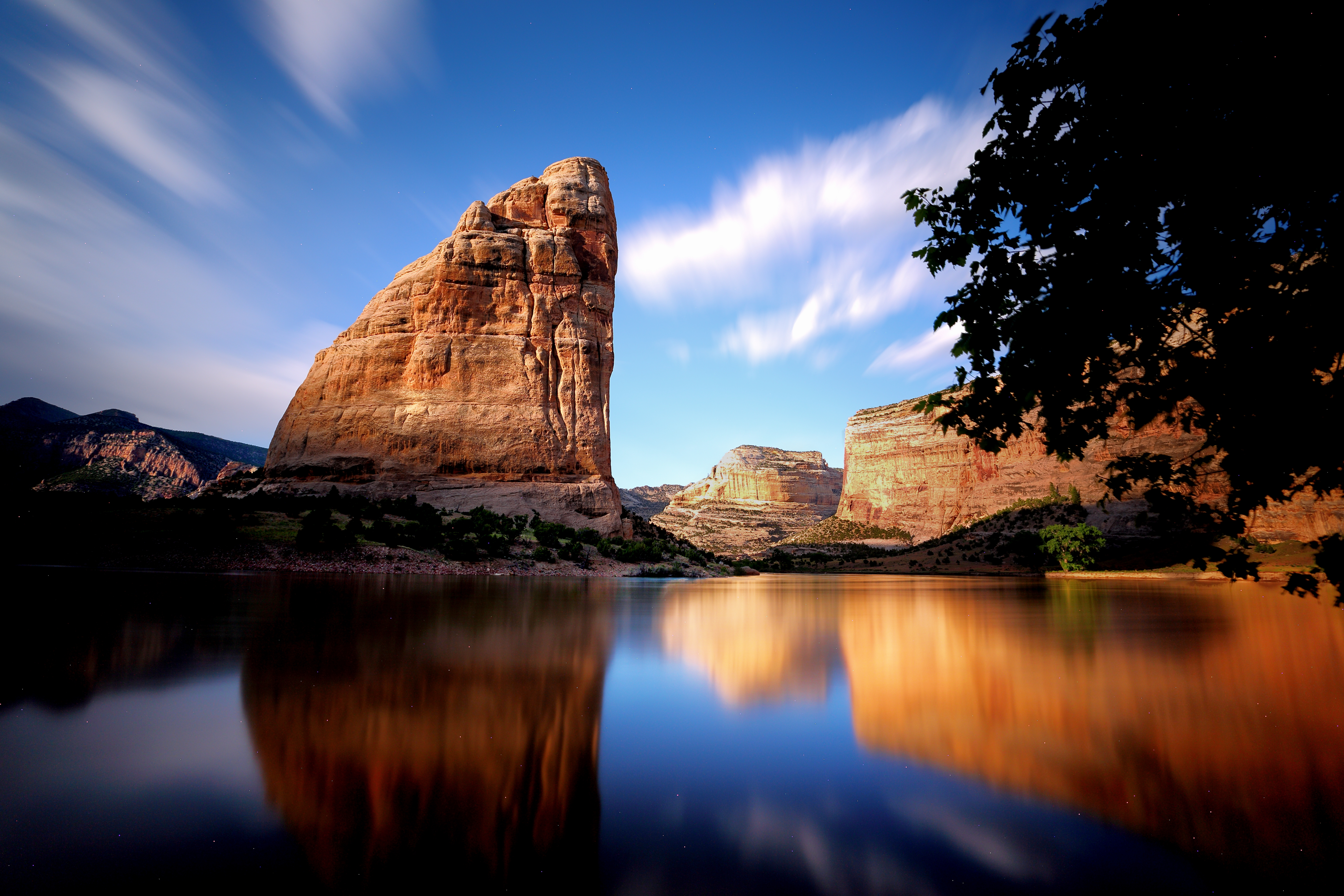
From the SSW

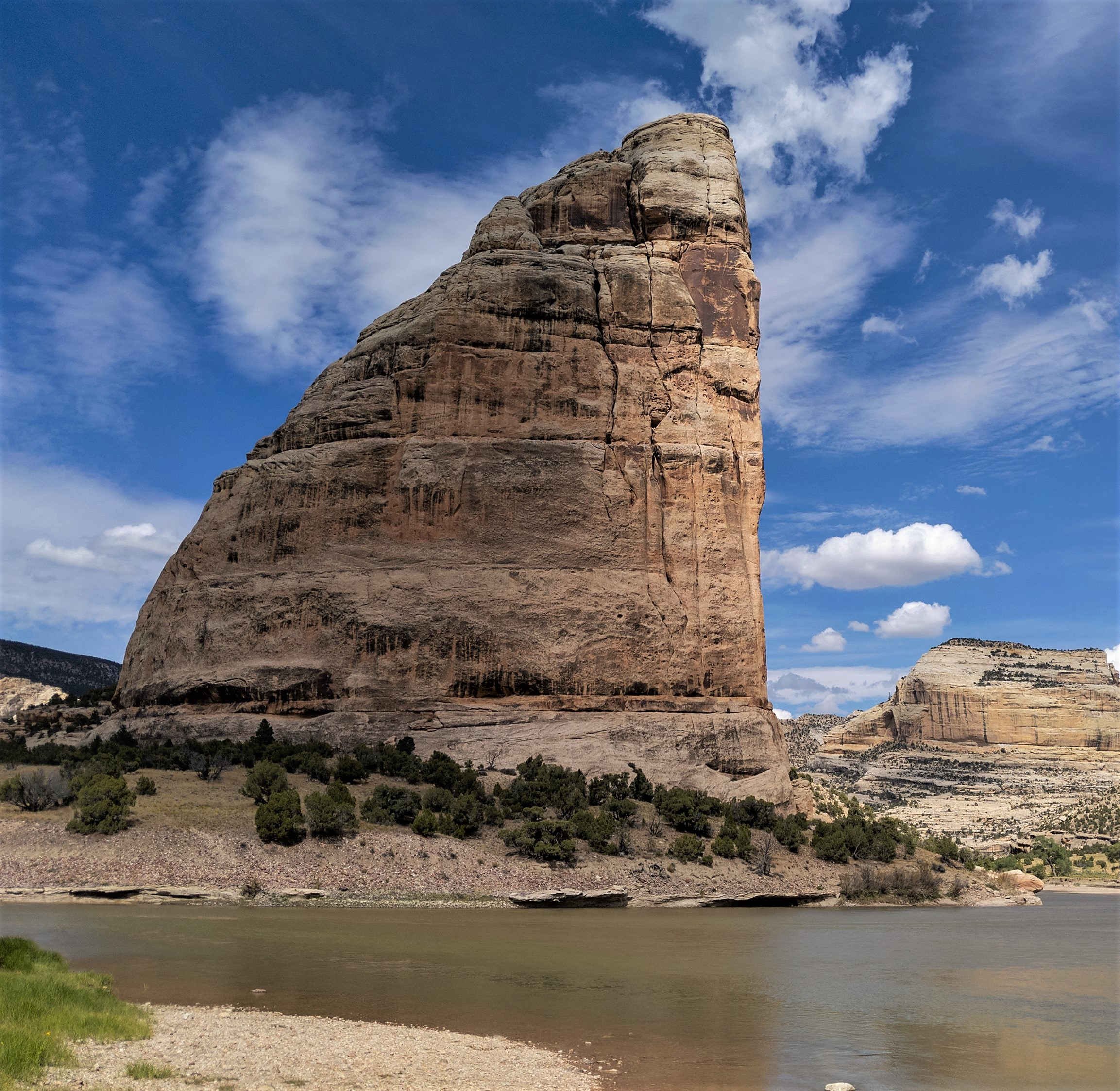
From the SSW

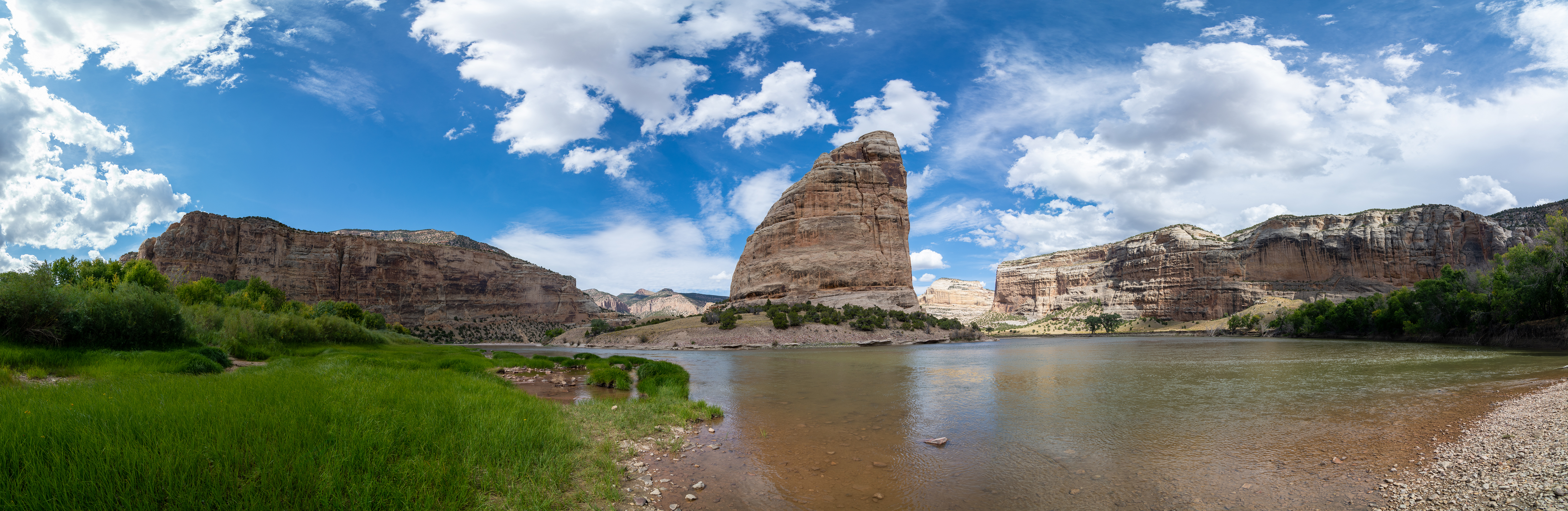
The south end of Steamboat Rock

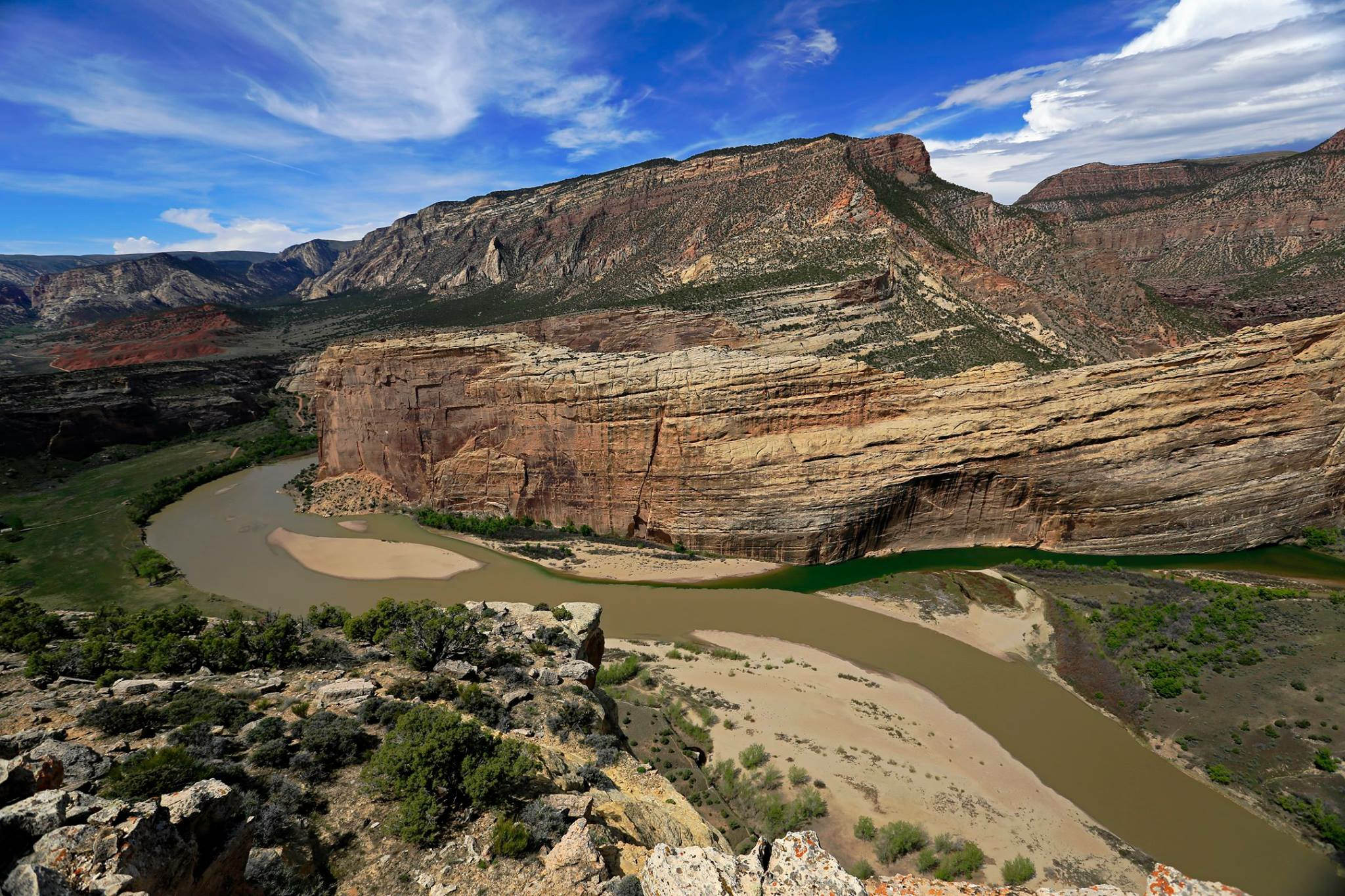
Confluence of the Green and Yampa Rivers below the east wall of Steamboat Rock

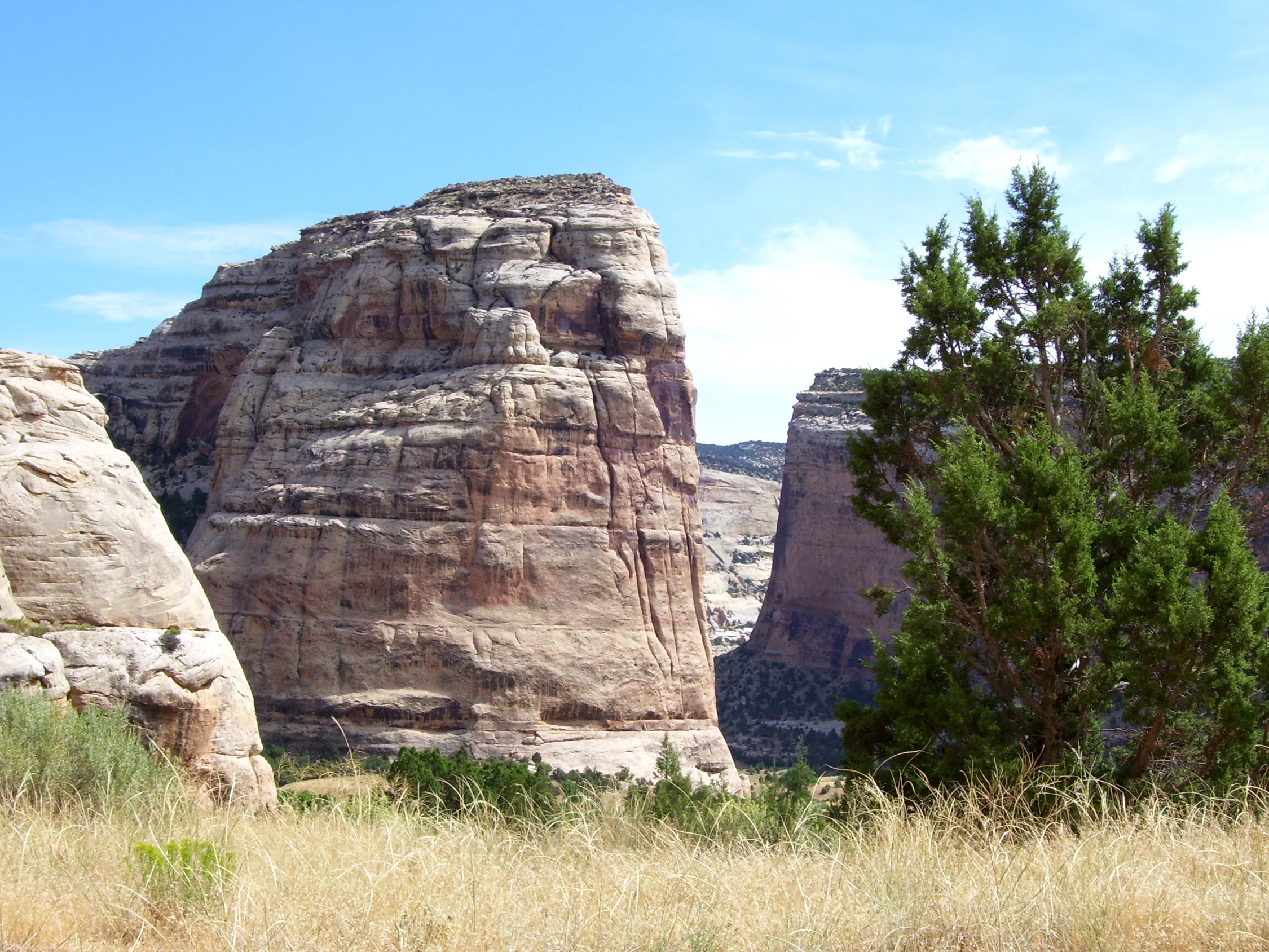
From the southwest

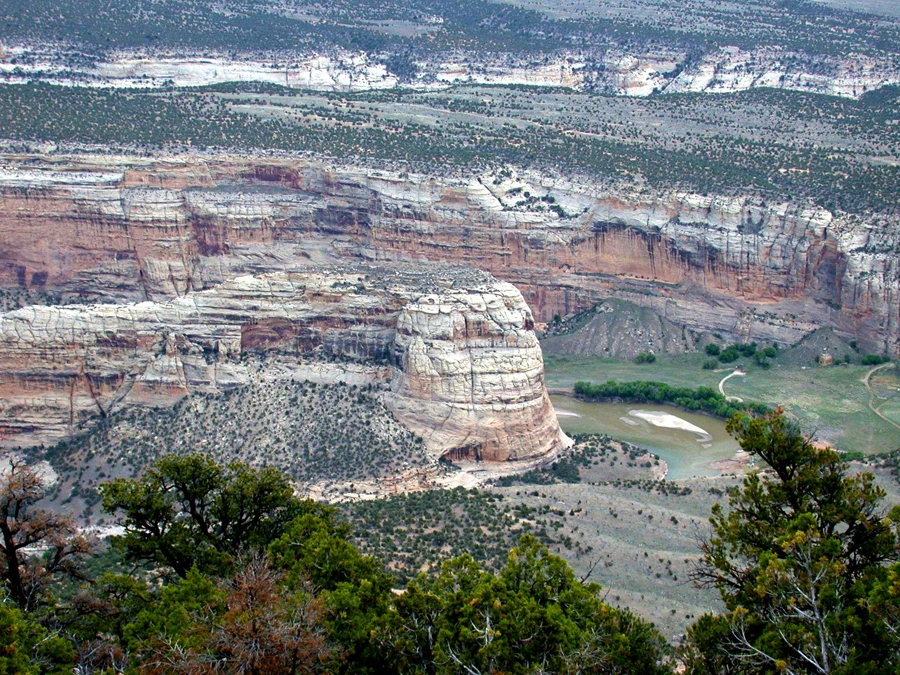
From the west

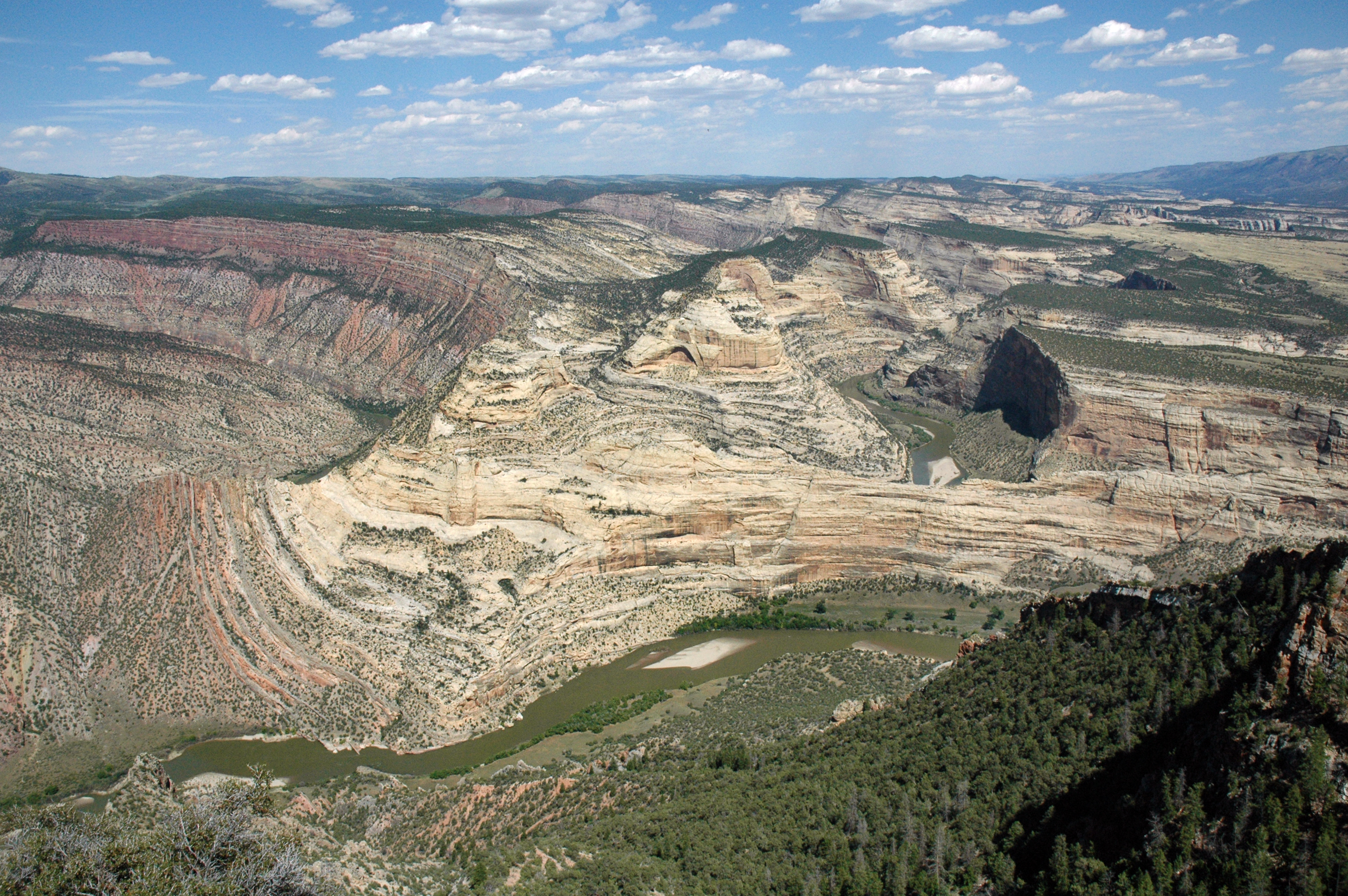
Broad view from the west

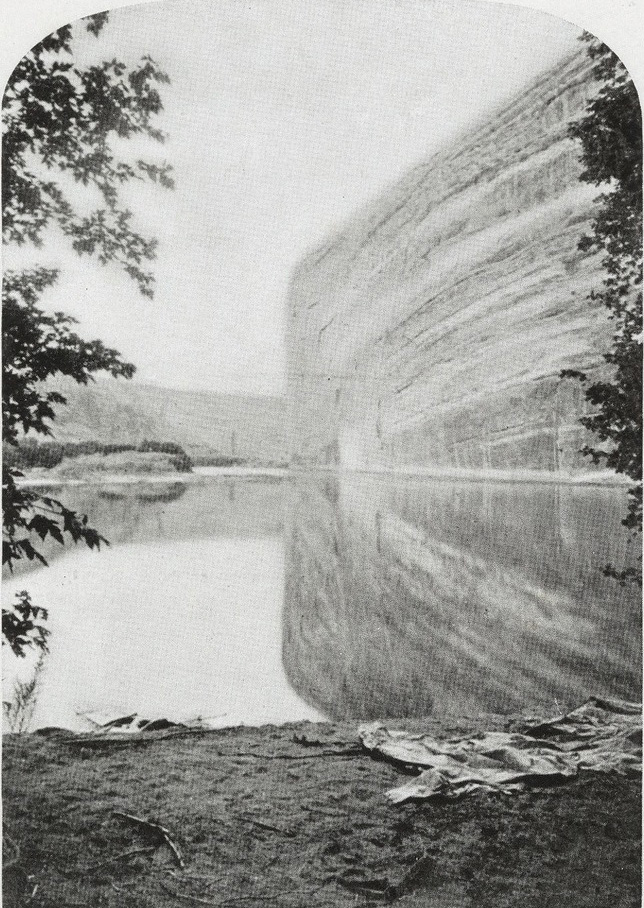
Earliest known image of Steamboat Rock (1871)

== Climate ==
Spring and fall are the most favorable seasons to visit Steamboat Rock. According to the Köppen climate classification system, it is located in a semi-arid climate zone, with temperatures averaging between 0 °F to 30 °F in January, and 50 °F to 100 °F in July. Typical of high deserts, summer temperatures can be exceedingly hot, while winter temperatures can be very cold. Snowfall is common, but the snow melts rapidly in the arid and sunny climate. Rainfall is very low, and the evaporation rate classifies the area as desert, even though the rainfall exceeds 10 inches.

Climate data for Dinosaur National Monument
Month	Jan	Feb	Mar	Apr	May	Jun	Jul	Aug	Sep	Oct	Nov	Dec	Year
Mean daily maximum °F (°C)	33.0 (0.6)	39.0 (3.9)	50.4 (10.2)	60.8 (16.0)	71.9 (22.2)	83.2 (28.4)	90.5 (32.5)	87.9 (31.1)	77.7 (25.4)	63.6 (17.6)	45.7 (7.6)	34.2 (1.2)	61.5 (16.4)
Mean daily minimum °F (°C)	10.8 (−11.8)	15.2 (−9.3)	25.0 (−3.9)	31.8 (−0.1)	40.5 (4.7)	48.9 (9.4)	56.6 (13.7)	54.7 (12.6)	45.5 (7.5)	34.9 (1.6)	23.3 (−4.8)	12.7 (−10.7)	33.3 (0.7)
Average precipitation inches (mm)	0.64 (16)	0.56 (14)	0.88 (22)	1.17 (30)	1.30 (33)	1.06 (27)	1.01 (26)	0.89 (23)	1.24 (31)	1.46 (37)	0.80 (20)	0.62 (16)	11.64 (296)
Average snowfall inches (cm)	9.2 (23)	6.6 (17)	5.9 (15)	3.5 (8.9)	0.7 (1.8)	0.2 (0.51)	0.0 (0.0)	0.0 (0.0)	0.2 (0.51)	1.6 (4.1)	4.7 (12)	8.3 (21)	41.1 (104)
Source: The Western Regional Climate Center
