= Stagecoach Express =

Stagecoach Express may refer to:

- Stagecoach Express (film), a 1942 American Western
- Stagecoach Group, a British transport business
