= Stagecoach Inn (Leicester, Vermont) =

- U.S. National Register of Historic Places
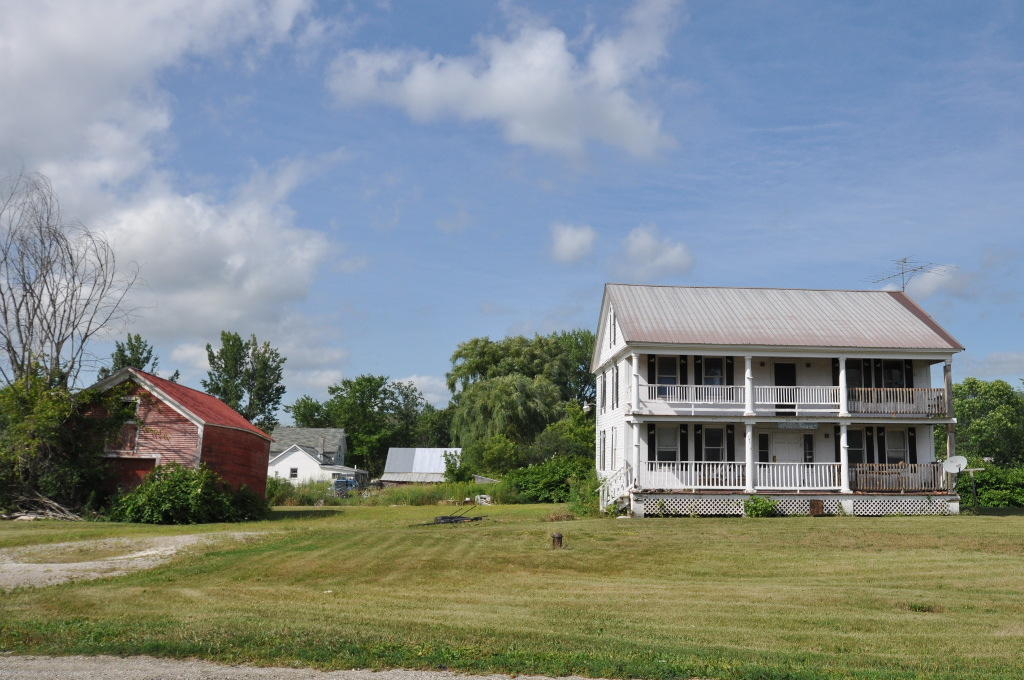

- Location within Vermont Location within the United States
- Location: U.S. 7 and Fern Lake Rd., Leicester, Vermont
- Coordinates: 43°51′57″N 73°6′27″W
- Area: 5 acres (2.0 ha)
- Built: 1830
- Architectural style: Greek Revival, Federal, Georgian center hall
- NRHP reference No.: 84000674
- Added to NRHP: November 15, 1984

The Stagecoach Inn is a historic building at the corner of United States Route 7 and Fern Lake Road in the center of Leicester, Vermont. Built about 1830, it is one of the best-preserved examples of a 19th-century stagecoach accommodation between Rutland and Vergennes, with a distinctive combination of Federal and Greek Revival architectural elements. Now converted to a residence, it was listed on the National Register of Historic Places in 1984.

== Description and history ==
The former Stagecoach Inn stands facing south toward Fern Lake Road, just east of its junction with US 7, across which Leicester's small town center is located. It is a 2 1/2-story wood-frame structure, with a side-gable roof and clapboarded exterior. It is set on a modern concrete block foundation, having been moved back from the highway and turned 90 degrees in 1977. Its most distinctive exterior feature is the two-story from porch, which is recessed under the main roof. The porch is supported by Doric columns with differing details on the first and second floors. The main entrance is at the center of the five-bay facade, flanked by sidelight windows and pilasters, with a porch entrance directly above which has similar pilasters. An integral ell extends to the rear of the building. Both the main block and ell retain original features on the interior, including woodwork and door hardware, fireplace surrounds, and stencilwork on the walls.

The structure's construction date is uncertain, but it was probably begun before 1830, intended to be a retail store. It was purchased by Dr. William Gile, a prominent local physician, who is credited with completing the building's construction and opening it as a traveler's accommodation on the Rutland-Vergennes stagecoach route (now US 7). It was operated as such until 1859, also serving as a local social meeting point. It was thereafter converted into a strictly retail space, serving as a general store and post office into the 20th century, when it was converted into a private residence. It was moved (remaining on its 5-acre (2.0 ha) lot) in 1977 because its location close to the main road impeded sightlines from Fern Lake Road.

== See also ==
- National Register of Historic Places listings in Addison County, Vermont
