= Stagecoach State Park =

State park in Colorado, United States

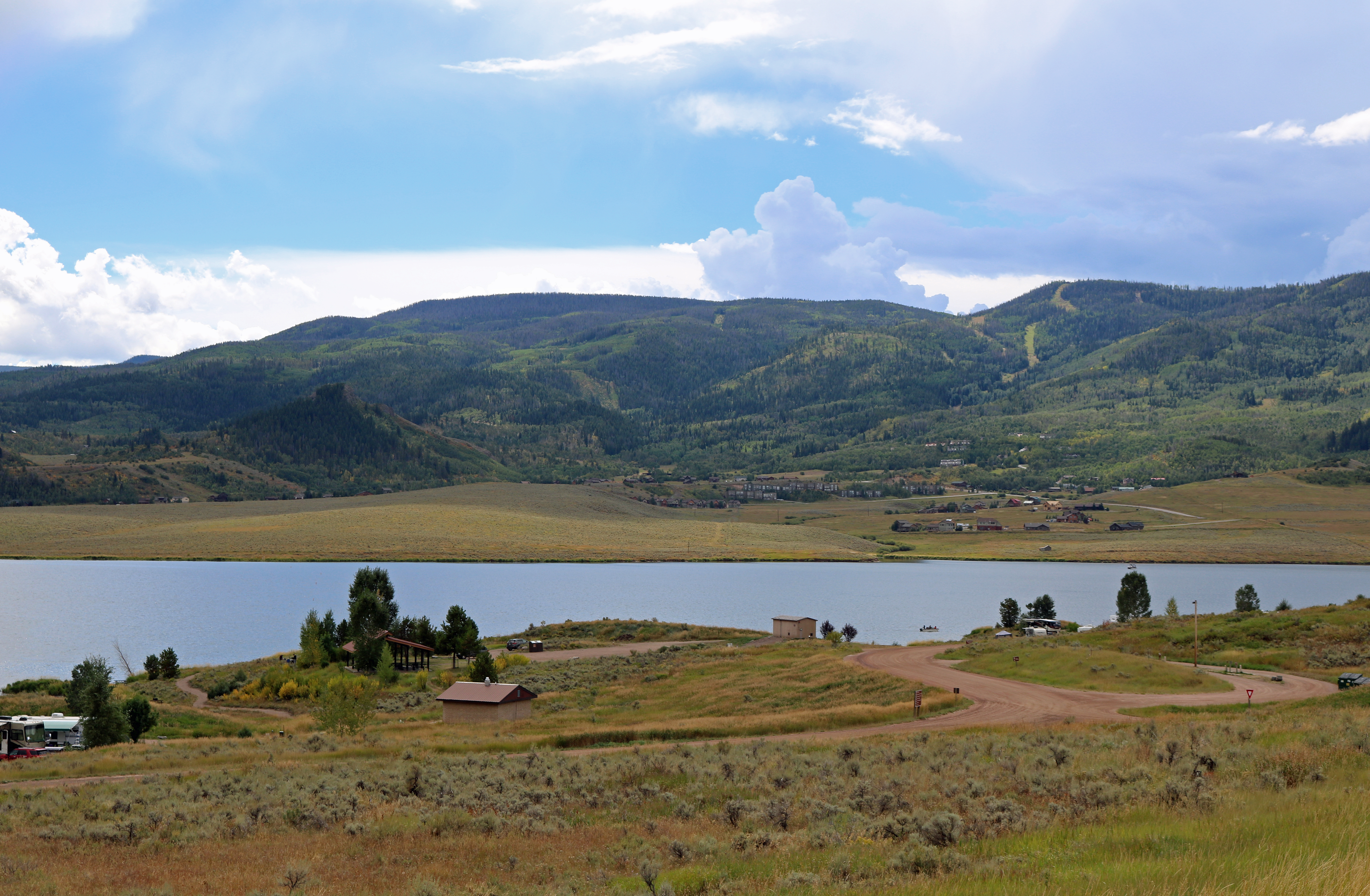
- A view across the reservoir.

- Location within Colorado
- Location: Routt County, Colorado, United States
- Nearest city: Steamboat Springs, CO
- Coordinates: 40°17′18″N 106°51′42″W
- Area: 1,641 acres (6.64 km^{2})
- Established: 1989
- Visitors: 234,885 (in 2021)
- Governing body: Colorado Parks and Wildlife

Stagecoach State Park is a Colorado State Park located in Routt County 17 miles (27 km) south of Steamboat Springs, Colorado. The 1,641-acre (6.64 km^{2}) park established in 1989 includes a 771-acre (3.12 km^{2}) reservoir on the Yampa River formed by Stagecoach Dam. Facilities include a marina, boat ramps, campsites, picnic sites and 8 miles (13 km) of trails. Park uplands are montane shrub communities, with riparian areas and wetlands around the reservoir and along the river. Commonly sighted wildlife includes elk, mule deer, coyote, red fox and badger.
