= Stagecoach Ballroom =

Dance venue in Texas

Coordinates: 32.76903°N 97.30947°W

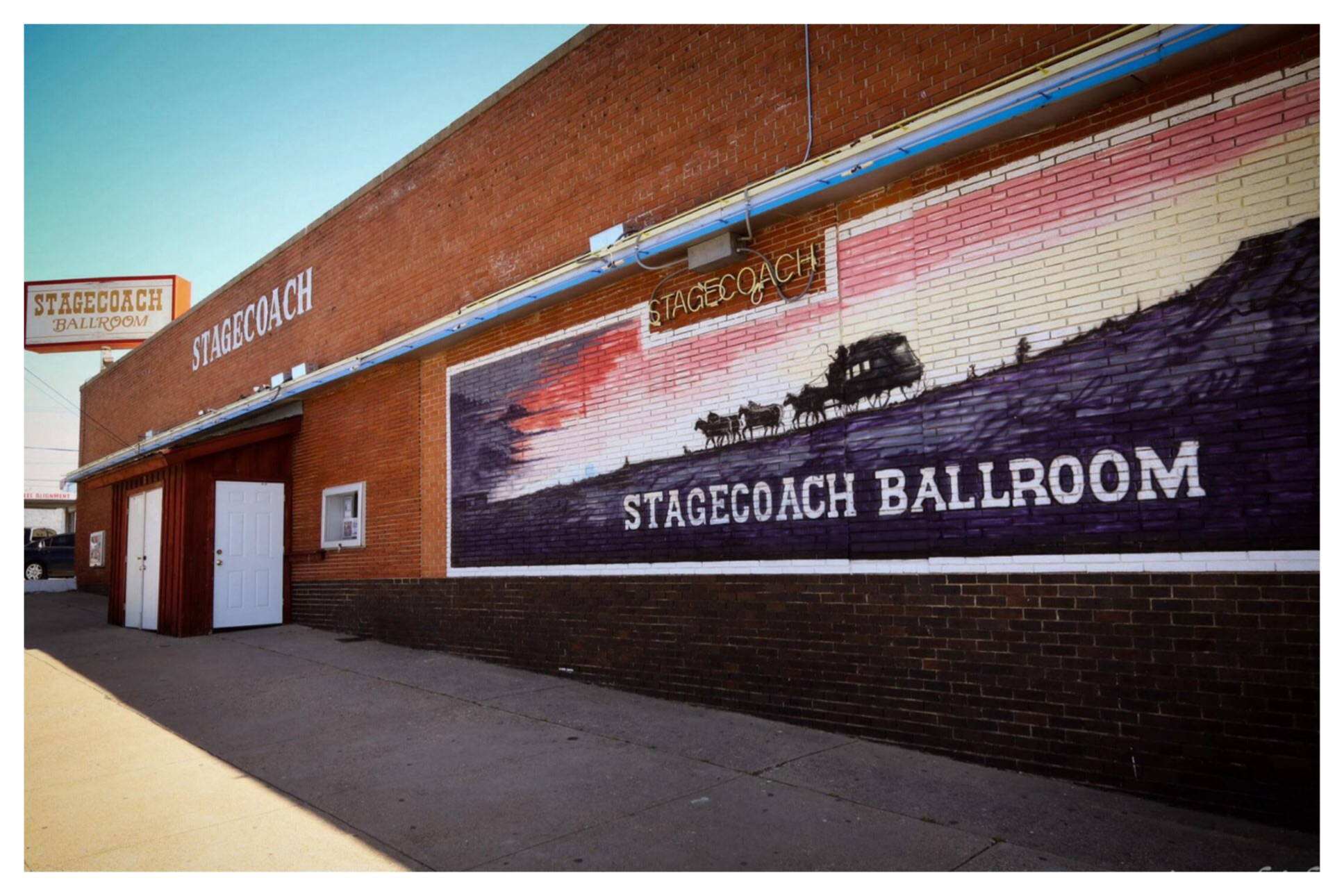

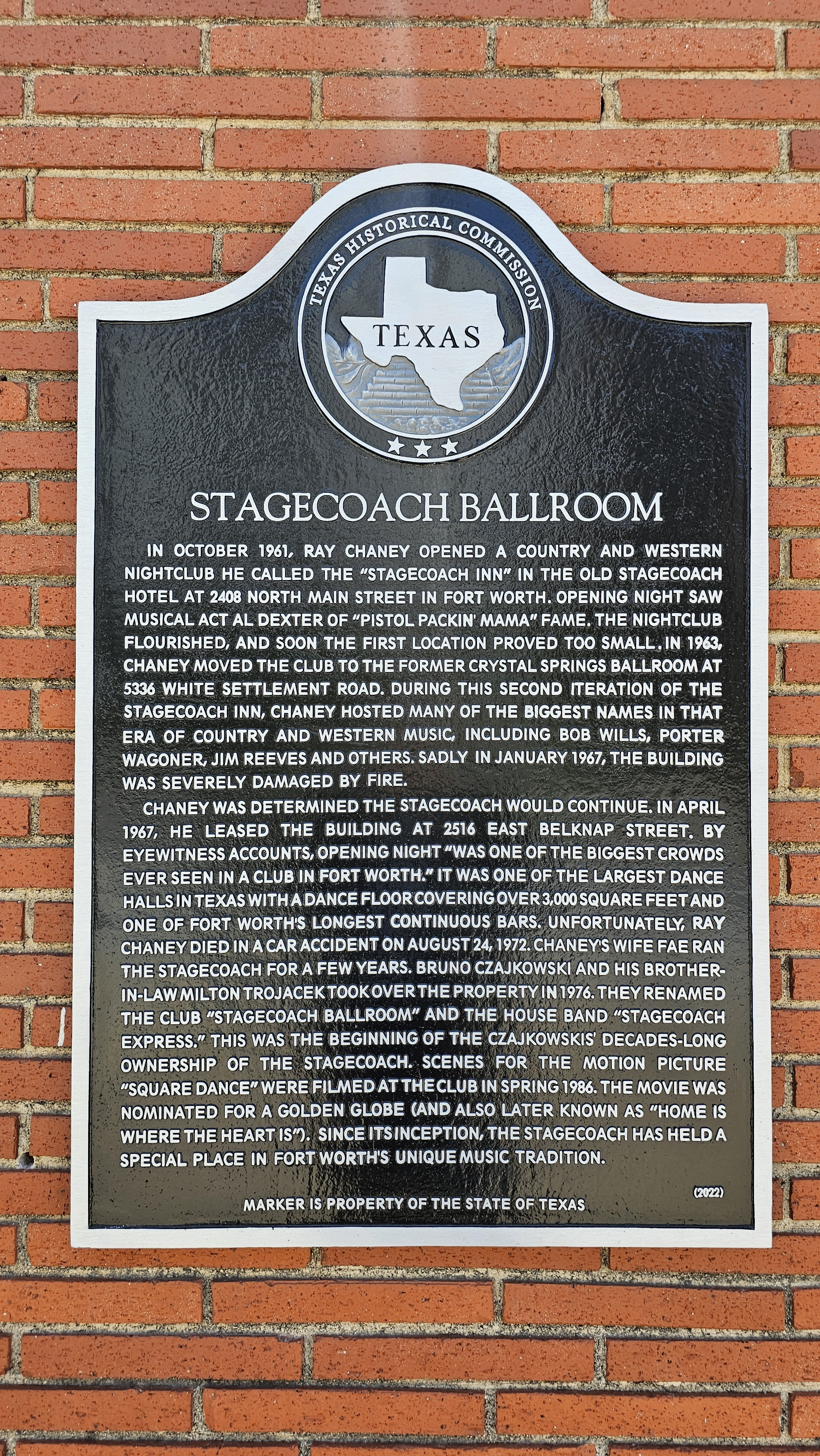

Stagecoach Ballroom is one of the oldest night club, dancehall, ballroom, and/or honky-tonk venues in the state of Texas. The Stagecoach Ballroom is known for its commitment to country music and ballroom dancing.

Since 1961, the Stagecoach Ballroom has been under the ownership of two families and survived three locations. The current location at 2516 E Belknap St, Fort Worth, Texas, was its third and it has been at that address since 1967.

== History ==
In October 1961, Ray Chaney opened the first generation of the Stagecoach Inn in the old Stagecoach Hotel at 2408 North Main Street in Fort Worth, Texas. On opening night, he had Al Dexter of "Pistol Packin' Mama" fame as his first act. He did quite well at the location.

By 1963, the crowds got too large, and Ray moved his club to the then Crystal Springs Ballroom at 5336 White Settlement Rd and began the second generation of the Stagecoach Inn.

Chaney booked many of the biggest names of the era at his club. Those names included Willie Nelson, Bob Wills, Porter Wagoner, Jim Reeves, and Bobby Bare. The last performer to appear at the Stagecoach Inn in White Settlement was Tommy Duncan on January 19, 1967. That week the club was destroyed by a fire.

In April 1967, Chaney leased a building that was once a Safeway store and opened the Stagecoach Inn where it stands today at 2516 East Belknap Street in Fort Worth. There were 300 parking spaces and Fort Worth’s longest bar. When the new Stagecoach Inn opened, Bo Powell and Gene Kelly noted that “it was one of the biggest crowds ever seen in a club in Fort Worth".

But this time it may have peaked too soon. In late 1968 Ray told his employees that if business didn't start to pick up, he was going to have to close the place. That New Year’s Eve his old friend "whom he had once told to give up singing", Willie Nelson, came in to play and brought the crowds along with him. That seemed to be the spark that renewed the interest in the Stagecoach Inn.

On August 24, 1972, Chaney died in a car accident. It was reported that he was on his way home, north of Fort Worth, hit a bridge abutment and was not found until several minutes after the car caught fire.

Chaney's wife Fae ran the Stagecoach for a few years and was under a binding lease agreement until Bruno Czajkowski and his brother-in-law Milton Trojacek took over the property from the management company circa 1974. By March 1976 they were running the Stagecoach Inn. They renamed the club the Stagecoach Ballroom and the house band the Stagecoach Express.

In November of 1976, a black and white photo of Johnny Rodriguez was published in the advertisement section of the Fort Worth Star-Telegram, and that evening over 2,700 people attended the performance. For more than 20 years the house band played every night and would open and close the show for special guests and events.

In 1983, Jean Czajkowski, Bruno's daughter, who was designing accounting software, started managing the financials for the Stagecoach. On January 20, 1984, she purchased Trojacek's half of the property and business to partner with her parents for the next several years. From the beginning until 1986, the Stagecoach was B.Y.O.B. or “Bring Your Own Bottle.” Pivoting with the times, the Czajkowskis updated the licensing to add a mixed beverage permit.

It is one of the largest dance halls in Texas, with a dance floor covering over 3,500 square feet. and still boasts of one of the longest continuous bars in Fort Worth. As it did from the beginning, the Stagecoach Ballroom strives to provide local musicians a place to entertain as well as welcoming Artists who have performed within the walls of the Stagecoach (Inn or Ballroom, or both) include Bob Wills, Willie Nelson, Loretta Lynn, Charley Pride, Ray Price, Johnny Bush, Ernest Tubb, Gene Watson, Johnny Lee, John Conlee, Johnny Rodriguez, T. Graham Brown, Bellamy Brothers, Doug Stone, Carl Vaughn, Hank Thompson, Kitty Wells, Moe Bandy, Joe Stampley, Joe Paul Nichols, Mickey Gilley, Tracy Byrd, Ray Sharp, Eddy Raven, TG Sheppard, Gary Stewart, David Ball, Billy Joe Royal, Robert Earl Keen, Boxcar Willie, Bill Mack, Janie Fricke, Daryle Singletary, Lorrie Morgan, Exile, Jeff Woolsey & The Dancehall Kings, Marty Haggard, Noel Haggard, Jody Nix & The Texas Cowboys, Dale Watson, Sonny Burgess, Wade Hayes, Billy Mata & The Texas Tradition, Jake Hooker & The Outsiders Band and Tommy Alverson.

== In popular culture ==
In the spring of 1986, the Stagecoach Ballroom was home to the filming of the national motion picture released in 1987 titled "Square Dance." The film was nominated for a Golden Globe and starred Rob Lowe, Wynona Rider, Jason Robards and Jane Alexander, as well as Trace Adkins as a member of the "Bayou Band." In 1988, Golden Globe nominated Rob Lowe for Best Performance by an Actor in a Supporting Role. The film later appeared as an NBC movie of the week under the title "Home Is Where the Heart Is." In October of 1994, TBS filmed a segment of its series "America's Music: The Roots of Country" that was released in 1996 as a three-part, six episode documentary. In 1997 it was an Emmy nominee for "Outstanding Achievement in Informational Programming."

It was also where the music video for Ella Langley's mega-hit Choosin' Texas was filmed.

Since 1999, Jean and her husband Kiran, have owned and operated the club.
