= Stagecoach Dam =

Coordinates: 40°17′07″N 106°49′55″W

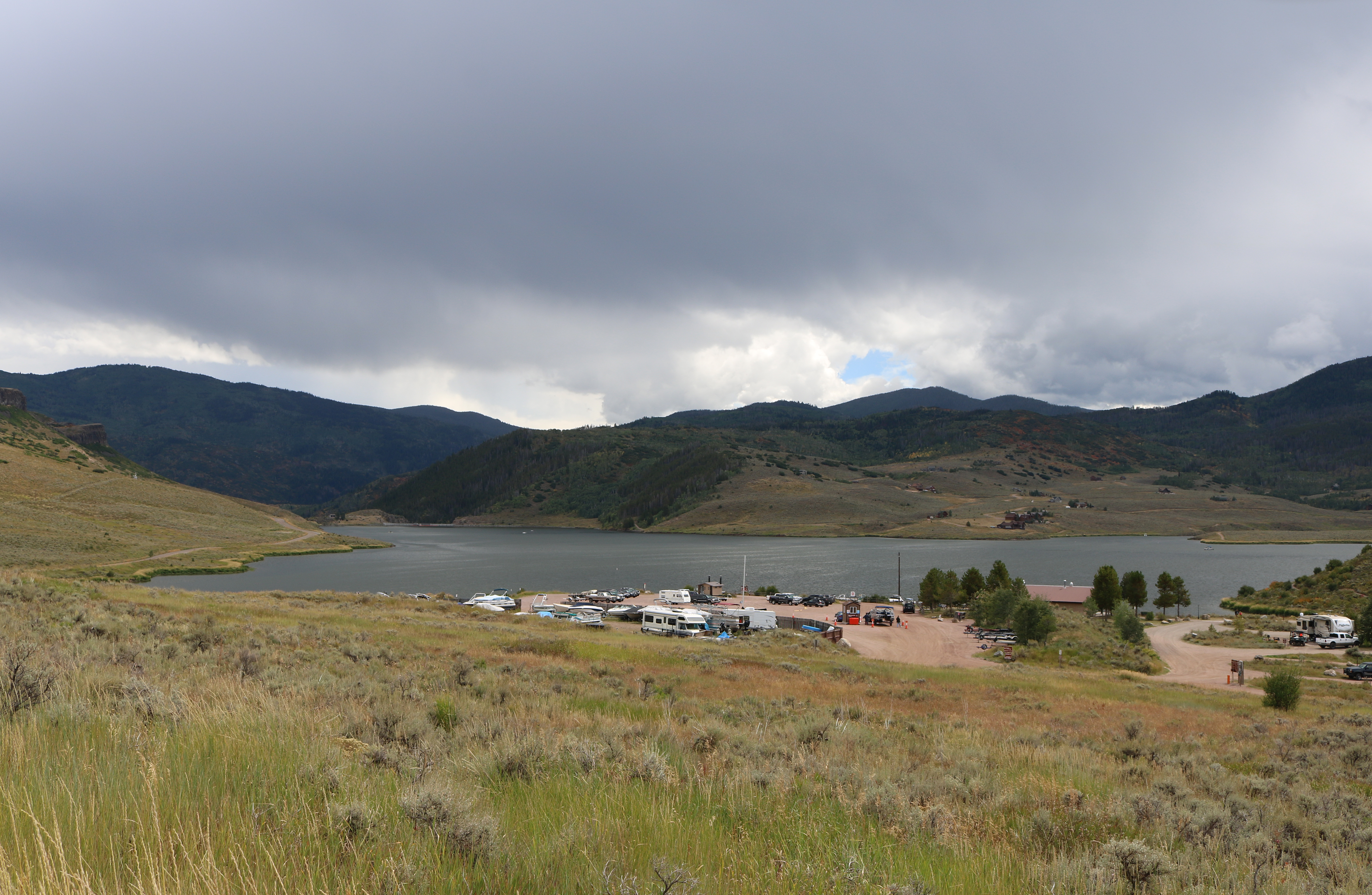
Stagecoach Dam (center left) on Stagecoach Reservoir.

Stagecoach Dam is a gravity dam on the Yampa River in Routt County, Colorado, located about 20 miles (32 km) south of Steamboat Springs. Built of roller-compacted concrete, the dam is 145 feet (44 m) high and 360 feet (110 m) long. The impounded water forms Stagecoach Reservoir, with a storage capacity of 33,700 acre⋅ft (41,600,000 m^{3}) and a surface area of 780 acres (320 ha) at maximum pool. The dam serves for irrigation, municipal water supply, and flood control, and it also supports a hydroelectric power station with a capacity of 800 kilowatts.

First proposed in 1983, the dam was completed on August 12, 1989, after just 37 days of construction. The dam and reservoir are owned and operated by the Upper Yampa Water Conservancy District.

== See also ==
- Stagecoach State Park
