= Butterfly Pavilion =

Insect zoo in Westminster, Colorado, US

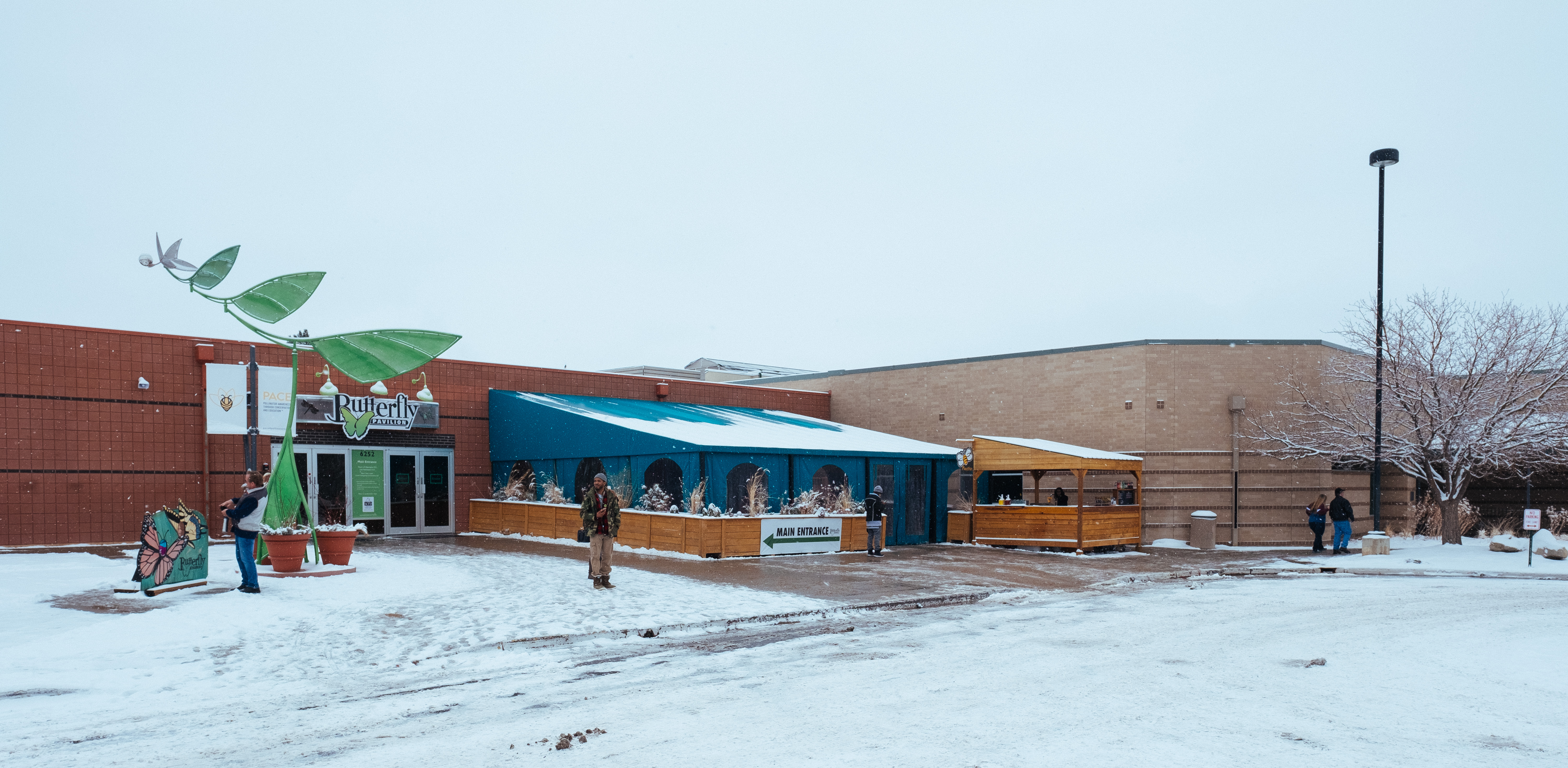
- Interactive map of Butterfly Pavilion
- 39.8872°N 105.0665°W
- Date opened: July 15, 1995
- Location: Westminster, Colorado, United States
- Land area: 11 acres (4.5 ha)
- Floor space: 30,000 ft^{2} (2,800 m^{2})
- Website: butterflies.org

Butterfly Pavilion is a butterfly house located in Westminster, Colorado. It opened on July 15, 1995, and was the first stand-alone non-profit insect zoo in the United States. The 30,000-square-foot (2,800 m^{2}) facility is situated on 11 acres (4.5 ha) of land, and contains five main exhibit areas to teach visitors about butterflies and other invertebrates. The main exhibit is an indoor rain forest filled with 1,200 free-flying tropical butterflies.

The Butterfly Pavilion is a non-profit facility with most of its funding coming from admission fees, corporate sponsorship, and the Scientific and Cultural Facilities District (SCFD) of Colorado. Because it imports non-native insect species, the Pavilion is regulated by the USDA. Butterfly Pavilion is an AZA accredited facility.

== History ==
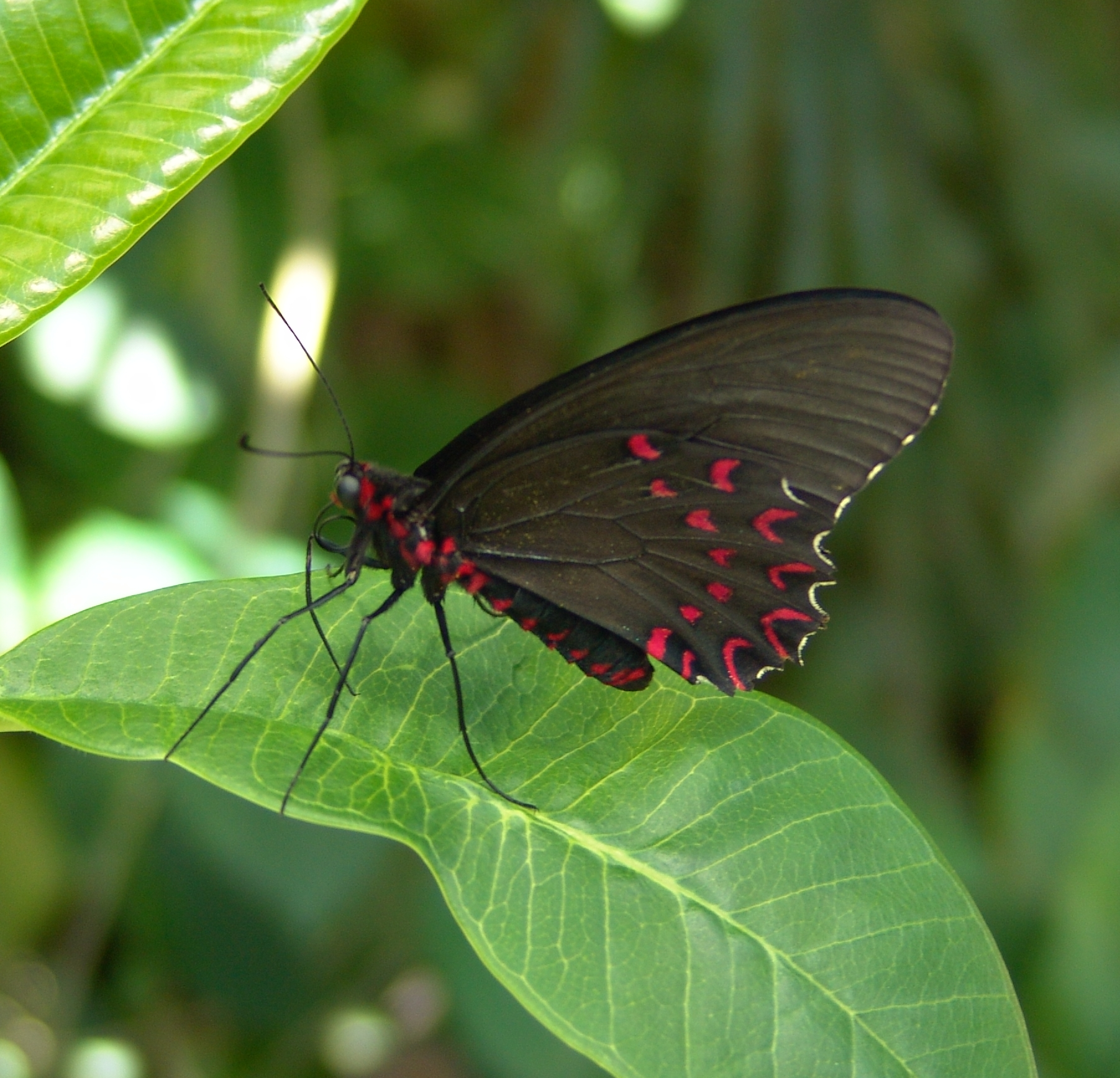
A butterfly at the Pavilion

In 1990, the Rocky Mountain Butterfly Consortium was created with the intention of creating a public butterfly house. The Butterfly Pavilion and Insect Center, a free-standing butterfly house and invertebrate zoo, was opened about five years later on July 15, 1995. It joined the Scientific and Cultural Facilities District (SCFD) as a Tier II organization in 1996, and in 1997 launched their first outreach program, the Bugmobile, which serves 20,000 students annually as of 2010. In 1997, the Pavilion was also recognized as the fastest growing cultural attraction in Denver. In 1998, the administrative offices were converted into Water's Edge, a tide pool exhibit.

In 2000, the Adult Education department was started, and in 2002, the Pavilion started offering accredited teacher enrichment courses in partnership with the Colorado School of Mines. 2003 saw the start of construction for a 13,000-square-foot (1,200 m^{2}) addition to the Pavilion, which was completed and opened in 2004. The new space included four classrooms, administrative offices, and a new exhibit space. In June 2007, the outdoor Dee Lidvall Discovery Garden was opened. The garden includes an educational amphitheater, habitat, sensory and xeriscape gardens, two gazebos, a patio, and a water feature with natural filtration. Its main purpose is to help link classroom education and the nature trail.

In 2008, the Pavilion’s curatorial department manager, Mary Ann Hamilton, served as a consultant for the NASA experiment “Butterflies and Spiders in Space.” She provided information for the teachers’ guide and assisted with ground control experiments at the Pavilion and in several classrooms in Colorado.

In February 2017, the group announced plans for a butterfly pavilion at the Gardens on Spring Creek in Fort Collins, with a planned 2019 opening. In May 2017, the group announced plans to move the main Westminster operation to the new Science and Technology Park being developed at Colorado 7 and Sheridan Pkwy. in Broomfield, about ten miles northeast of the main Westminster location.

== Exhibits ==
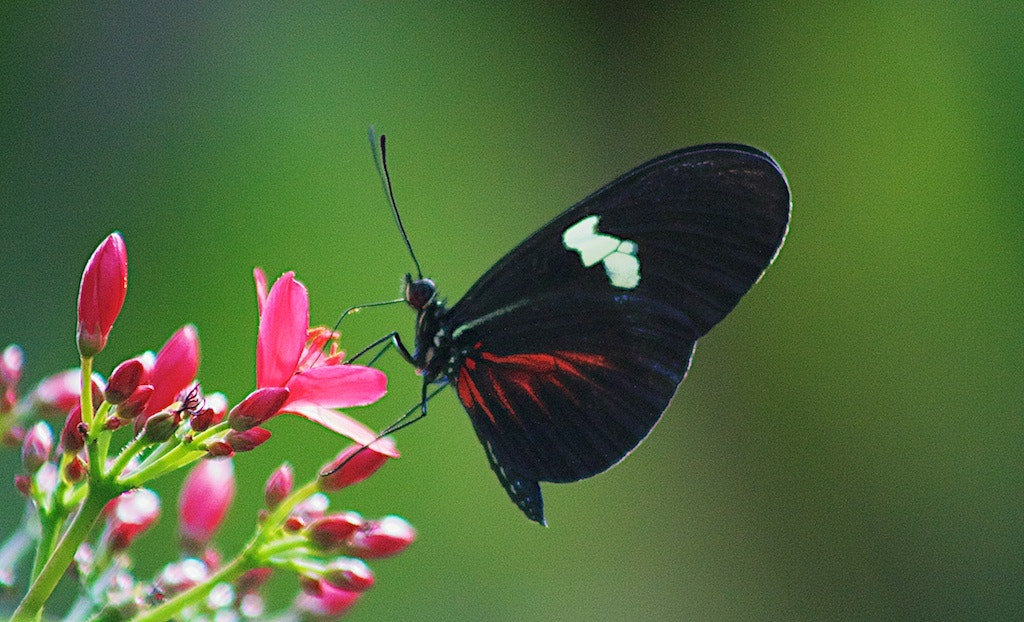
Many flowering plants can be seen throughout the pavilion.

Wings of the Tropics is a 7,000-square-foot (650 m^{2}) tropical conservatory with over 1,200 butterflies and 200 plant species from tropical rain-forests. On one side of the conservatory, visitors can watch the butterflies emerge from their chrysalides, and twice a day can watch the staff release them into the rain-forest. The Butterfly Pavilion purchases about 500 butterfly chrysalides each week from butterfly farms around the world.

Crawl-A-See-Em lets visitors observe tarantulas, leaf insects, scorpions, beetles, and giant millipedes, and even hold Rosie, a Chilean rose hair tarantula.

Water's Edge is about animals in Atlantic and Pacific Ocean tide pools. Visitors can see and touch sea stars, sea cucumbers, and horseshoe crabs.

The Nature Trail is a 0.5-mile (0.80 km) long trail just outside the Pavilion along Big Dry Creek. Here visitors can see Colorado's native insects, prairie dogs, and rabbits, and maybe even a heron, hawk, or eagle perched in a tree.

The outdoor Dee Lidvall Discovery Garden includes a butterfly garden planted with pincushion flower, cosmos, nicotiana and other colorful flowers to attract local butterflies, and a xeriscape garden sponsored by the Colorado Cactus and Succulent Society that includes dry land plants such as cactus, hardy ice plant, penstemon, yarrow, and lavender.

From mid-December to mid-January, Butterfly Pavilion also presents its Living Lights events on non-holiday Thurs.-Sun. nights.
