= Van Briggle Pottery =

Colorado-based art pottery company

- Industry: Ceramic manufacturing
- Founded: 1901
- Founder: Artus Van Briggle
- Headquarters: Colorado Springs, Colorado, United States
- Products: Art ware
- Website: www.vanbriggle.com

Van Briggle Art Pottery was at the time of its demise the oldest continuously operating art pottery in the United States, having been established in Colorado Springs, Colorado in 1901 by Artus and Anne Van Briggle. Artus had a significant impact on the Art Nouveau movement in the United States, and his pottery is foundational to American Art Pottery. (Note: Van Briggle called "leading figure" in American Art Nouveau movement.) (Note: "Revolutionized art pottery") (Note: "One of most famous factories") (Note: "won major awards...short but influential life") (Note: "renowned in the 1890s for the beauty of the designs of their art nouveau pottery") (Note: "Artus Van Briggle made (art nouveau) tiles famous in 1899") (Note: "received splendid reception throughout Europe and the United States") The Art Nouveau style favored by its founders continues to influence the pottery's designs.

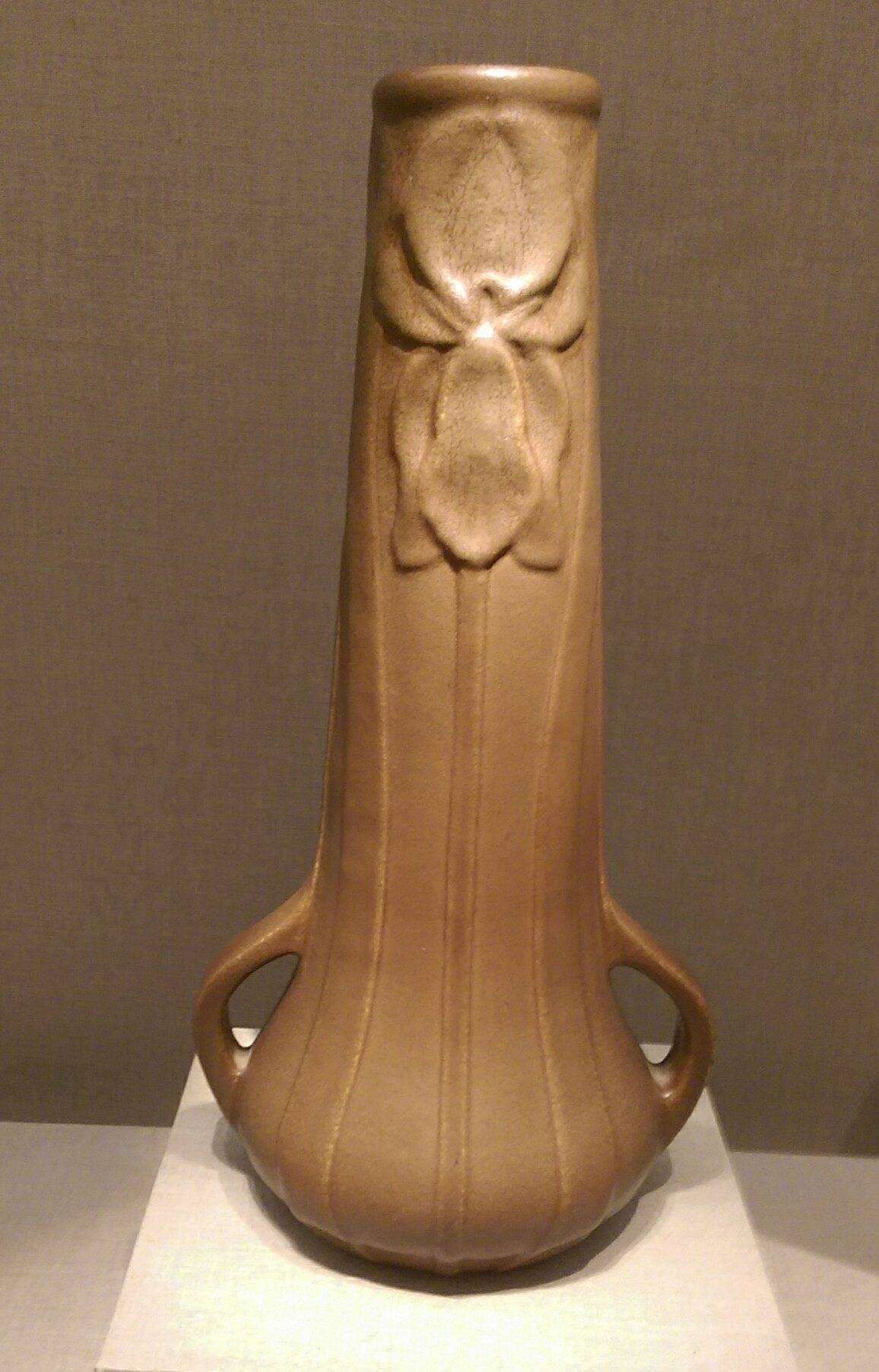
A 1903 vase by Artus Van Briggle, on display at the de Young Museum in San Francisco

Artus Van Briggle settled in Colorado Springs in 1899 after establishing himself as a notable artist with the Rookwood Pottery of Ohio. With Anne Louise (née Gregory), his new wife, Artus began exploring the Art Nouveau style in their pottery creations, drawing awards and accolades from the American and European art communities. Although he was a talented painter who had displayed and won awards in Europe, from 1899 until his death Artus devoted himself almost exclusively to the craft and art of pottery. Van Briggle's Art Nouveau designs and distinctive matte glazes were awarded high honors from prestigious sources, including the Paris Salon, the Saint Louis Exposition, the Lewis and Clark Centennial Exposition, and the American Arts and Crafts Exhibition in Boston.

The Van Briggle Pottery Studio closed in spring 2012.

== History ==
=== Early artistic career and studies ===
Artus Van Briggle in 1900.

Born to artistic parents on March 21, 1869, Artus Van Briggle had an early introduction to painting using materials found about the home. The Van Briggle family lived in Ohio, one of America's hotbeds of ceramic design. At the age of 17 he moved to Cincinnati, Ohio, where he decorated china dolls at the Arnold Fairyland Doll Store, while attending his early art studies at the Cincinnati Art School. After a stint at the Avon Pottery where he was introduced to the ceramic arts, Artus took a job at Rookwood Pottery. There he excelled at hand-painting designs. His skill and talent were recognized by Rookwood founder, Maria Storer, who became his benefactor, even sending him to France to study art at the Académie Julian in Paris.

In Europe, he was exposed to styles of art and became infatuated with an early matte glaze from the Chinese Ming Dynasty; a type that was lost to history. Artus also met his future wife, fellow American student Anne Lawrence Gregory, an accomplished artist in her own right. Finishing their Paris studies in 1896, they returned to America. Artus resumed his work at Rookwood and also started sculpting and experimented with recreating the lost Ming Dynasty glazes.

Matte blue glazed Despondency vase

=== Perfecting the distinctive dull or matte glaze ===
In 1899, struggling with health issues due to tuberculosis, Artus left Rookwood and moved to the drier air of Colorado Springs, Colorado. Upon befriending the Holmes family of Chico Basin, he stayed at the HOP Ranch during the summers of 1899, 1900, and 1901 to reduce work stress and regain strength while pursuing his own styles of pottery, centered around the Art Nouveau movement. He continued his research on the ancient matte glazes that fascinated him in Paris. After two years of trials and experiments a matte glaze was perfected. One of the matte glazes perfected by Artus was the matte blue glaze, based on an ancient Chinese process that had long been lost to history.

Artus opened Van Briggle Pottery in 1901 and was joined by Anne Gregory, who took a position as a high school art teacher in Colorado Springs. In 1903, Artus Van Briggle was appointed First Director of the Department of Art and Design in Colorado College, succeeding Louis Soutter, a Swiss artist (born in Geneva, Switzerland) he met in Paris in 1895.

In 1902, Anne and Artus were married, and she devoted herself to their pottery; she created designs and collaborated in all aspects of the enterprise with her husband. Late 1902 brought Van Briggle awards for his glazes and designs in Art Nouveau from the prestigious Paris Salon; he was now an accepted artist. During their early years, Artus and Ann established hundreds of Art Nouveau styles of pottery under the Van Briggle name. The Despondency vase won Van Briggle wide acclaim and first place at the Paris Salon in 1903. A display at the 1904 Centennial Exhibit in St. Louis won Van Briggle more awards and greater international fame.

Van Briggle Memorial Pottery

=== Pottery loses its founder ===
Artus Van Briggle died in July 1904, at the age of 35. Anne continued the pottery using the forms created by Artus as a foundation and adding more designs of her own. In 1907, Anne and pottery stockholder and city-founder William Jackson Palmer began construction on a new pottery on Uintah Street. The Van Briggle Memorial Pottery — designed by Dutch architect Nicholas Van den Arend — was opened in 1908 and stands today as a historic landmark noted for its architecture and use of ceramics in the facade.

Having remarried in 1908, Anne Louise Gregory Ritter leased the pottery in 1912 to Edmund deForest Curtis, who ran it until 1916. She sold the company in 1922 to J.F. and I.H. Lewis and moved to Denver the following year, where she would concentrate on painting and where she remained until her death in 1929. In her absence, the pottery fell under financial hardships and was sold at sheriff's auction; later it was re-sold, once more becoming the property of Mr. Curtis.

=== Surviving disaster and war ===
The pottery was sold twice more in the ensuing decade and survived a fire in 1919 that gutted the interior but left the brick shell and kilns. New owners I.F. and J.H. Lewis took the opportunity to modernize and expand the facility beginning in 1920 and stabilized the production and financial aspects of the pottery for the first time. Despite damage from the flood of 1935—the most destructive flood in Colorado Springs history— that destroyed much of the company's records and molds, the pottery continued to enjoy success up to World War II, when they closed for approximately three years as the United States focused its resources on the war effort.

With the increase of interstate travel in the United States a freeway was planned in 1953 for Colorado Springs which J.H. Lewis estimated would run through the Memorial Plant site. Although the freeway eventually was planned to avoid destroying the historic pottery, Mr. Lewis nonetheless put into action plans to relocate the pottery to a higher-traffic area of Colorado Springs. In 1955, Mr. Lewis and Clem Hull brought a new facility on line at a renovated railroad roundhouse on Midland Road. The new facility, known as the Midland Plant, had a smaller capacity but enjoyed quick success due to its location on the main highway to the Garden of the Gods and other tourist locations.

In 1968, Mr. Lewis sold the Memorial Plant to Colorado College, and it fell into disrepair for the ensuing 40 years, being used variously as offices and storage.

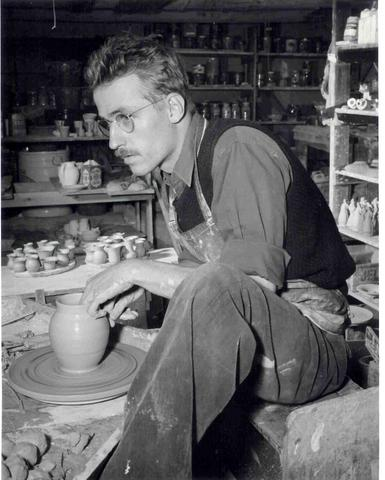
Clem Hull on the potter's wheel 1948.

=== New era ===
American tastes in the 1950s turned to modern designs and all things glossy, so Van Briggle embarked on a new era which saw the pottery continue to produce the traditional matte glazes and Art Nouveau designs, but which also saw the introduction of more trendy gloss glazes and modern designs. Longtime employee Kenneth Stevenson took majority control of the company in 1969, and the pottery continued to produce two distinct lines and enjoyed a period of expansion and relative stability under the production supervision of Fred Wills.

Mr. Stevenson died in 1990, leaving the pottery to his wife Bertha Stevenson and their son Craig A. Stevenson, now Van Briggle's chief designer. "If Artus Van Briggle walked in and saw our production facility today," according to Craig Stevenson, "he would certainly recognize a lot of what we're doing."

The Van Briggle Pottery Studio closed in spring 2012.

== Notable artists ==
Throughout its history, Van Briggle Pottery has attracted talented artisans and, since at least the 1930s, has featured tours and live displays of potters "throwing on the wheel."

Potters who have worked at Van Briggle include Ambrose Schlegel, Harry Bangs, Nellie Walker, William Higman, Clem Hull, Gene Hopkins, Fred Wills, Nelson Curtis, Joe Jezek, Craig Stevenson, Mark Sucharski, Lori Keenan, and Becky Hansen.

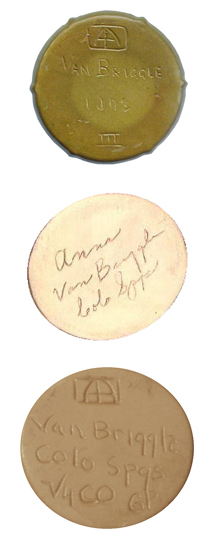
Mark samples, top to bottom: 1903; c. 1960; 2004.

== Identification ==
Collectors identify Van Briggle pottery by its distinctive glazes, shapes, and bottom markings. At left are samples of typical Van Briggle bottoms markings. Most such marks were hand-incised, so varied over time and between individuals.

The Van Briggle logo consists of a pair of conjoined A's inside a box, and is featured on most — but not all — Van Briggle pottery. Other marks that might appear on the bottom of their pottery include the text, "Van Briggle", "Colorado Springs, Colorado" most frequently abbreviated, artist marks indicating the artist who threw the piece or finished it, or both, clay batch numbers, and year of manufacture indicators. The variety of marks is broad and beyond the scope of an encyclopedia article to list.

== See also ==
- Arts and Crafts Movement
- Niloak Pottery
- Pewabic Pottery
- Pottery
- Studio pottery
