= Chico Basin Ranch =

Cattle ranch in Colorado, US

Coordinates: 38°30′30″N 104°26′25″W

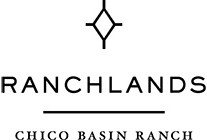
logo

The Chico Basin Ranch is a cattle ranch situated thirty minutes southeast of Colorado Springs, Colorado, United States. The Chico Basin is owned by the Colorado State Land Board. The cattle raised on the ranch are grass fed. Working cowboys tend to the cattle primarily using quarter horse. The establishment has a horse sanctuary for old or injured horses, and also functions as a wildlife preserve. The Chico Basin works with the Bird Conservancy of the Rockies to band migratory birds.

== History ==
The Chico Basin Ranch is owned and overseen by the Colorado State Land Board. The Colorado State Land Board was founded in 1876 to manage land given by the federal government to the state and creates revenue for some of the state's foundations and public education. Cattle first grazed on Chico Basin lands in the mid-1800s. Cattleman Charles Goodnight grazed many of his cattle on the present day Chico Basin Ranch. The HOP Ranch, located at the north end of Chico Basin Ranch, was formed by William Holmes and two Detroit business partners and started operations in 1871. Over the next hundred years the ranch land changed hands several times, eventually coming under the jurisdiction of the Pueblo Army Depot. The Chico Basin Land is currently being managed by Duke and Janet Phillips who stress the point of land conservation. In 1999, the Colorado State Land Board bought the 87,000 acres of land and made a lease with the Phillips family. The Phillips are able to lease the land for twenty-five years.

== Beef ==
The Chico Basin's grass-fed beef is sold through Lasater Grassland Beef, which sells grass-fed beef from both the Chico Basin and the Lasater Ranch. The cattle are raised with no exposure to antibiotics, pesticides, or hormones nor are they fed animal by-products. The beef is kept fresh by dry-aging for about two weeks and then by flash freezing. This is an older way to preserve meat.

== Horses ==
The quarter horses used to herd cows on the Chico Basin Ranch are raised and trained on the ranch. The twenty-five horses that are ridden by guests are trained to be ridden with a western saddle.

=== Horse Sanctuary ===
The Chico Basin Ranch has just recently opened a horse sanctuary where needy or injured horses can retire to live out their lives on the open range. The horses are gradually acclimated to large pastures. The horses are continually monitored to make sure they are safe and healthy. All supplemental feed, hoof trimming, and medical treatments are taken care of. The goal of the horse sanctuary is to give the retired horses a home in their natural habitat.

== Fishing and Hunting ==
The fishing and hunting on the Chico Basin is coordinated by a branch of Ranchlands LLC, Box T Cowboys. Hunts range from released upland game birds to big game opportunities. Big game hunting includes mule deer. Waterfowl hunting is also available to hunters. There are five lakes that contain bass, crappie, and blue gill.

== Bird Watching ==
The Chico Basin Ranch is a bird banding station for the Bird Conservancy of the Rockies. Bird banding helps biologists understand migratory habits and bird anatomy. Mist nets are used to catch birds without harming them. Once caught, a small metal band is placed on the bird's leg. Each band is numbered so when a bird is recaptured scientists will know when and where it was banded. The bird's condition is observed by checking its weight and measurements. Banding stations are also important for education. There are over three hundred birds on the ranch bird list.

== Education ==
Free programs are offered for children of ages and college students. Activities incorporate different subjects like science, math, and geography. Other topics include: aquatic invertebrates, grasslands ecology, botany, livestock grazing, ranch animal anatomy and physiology, natural art, prairie dog studies, and pioneer studies. Teaching Environmental Science-Naturally is a program sponsored by the Colorado Division of Wildlife. Some of the camps that are offered are On the Wing which is a summer camp for bird observatory, Scouting which is for boy and girl scouts, and Ranch Camp which teaches about life on a working cattle ranch. For adults, the Chico Basin has a class in holistic resource management, grazing planning, horsemanship, and ranch roping.

== Partnerships ==
- The Nature Conservancy
- Rocky Mountain Bird Observation
- American Birding Association
- Colorado State Department of Agriculture
- Pikes Peak Birding Trail
- The Quivera Coalition
- The Allan Savory Center for Holistic Management
- Lasater Grasslands Beef
- Sustainable Beef Productions
- Cattle Industry of the American West
- Colorado Historical Society
- Colorado Adventure Guide
- Colorado Film Resources
- American Cowboy
- National Park Service
- Savory
- Colorado Parks & Wildlife
