= HOP Ranch =

Ranch in Colorado

Coordinates: 38°32′27″N 104°27′58″W

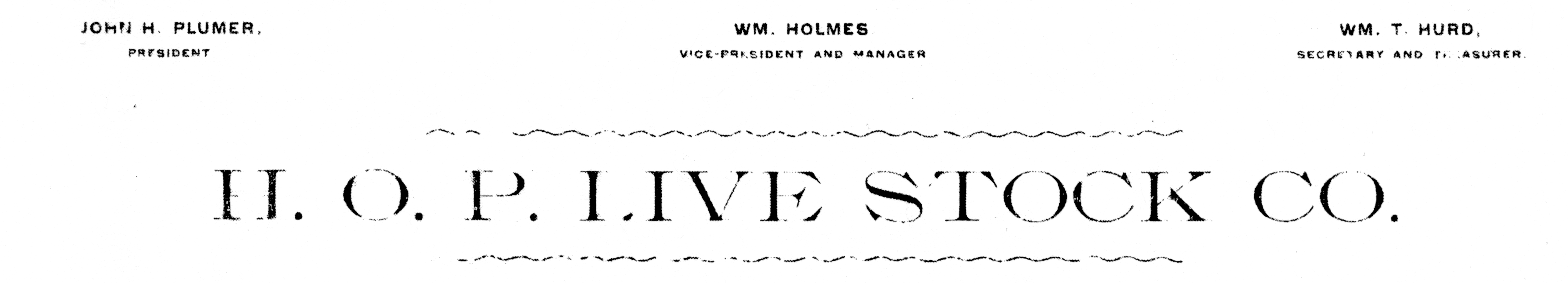
- Industry: Cattle Ranch
- Founded: Detroit, Michigan (October 1, 1871)
- Founder: Wm. T. Hurd, Wm. Holmes, and Samuel A. Plumer
- Fate: Sold in 1929
- Successor: Horse Creek Land & Cattle (Drinkard & Emmert)
- Headquarters: ~20 mi SE of Fountain, Colorado, United States
- Number of locations: 2 (Detroit and Chico Basin, Colorado)
- Brands: HOP

The HOP Ranch was a historic ranch in El Paso and Pueblo counties in Colorado, located approximately 35 miles (56 km) southeast of Colorado Springs, in the Chico Creek basin just south of present-day Hanover, Colorado. Sometimes referred to as the Holmes Ranch or the Chico Basin Ranch, it was among the first cattle ranches established in Colorado Territory in 1871 during the times of open range before fences became prevalent in the west. It operated for 58 years until it was sold in 1929 to a Drinkard and Emmert company, Horse Creek Land & Cattle Co. of Denver. The HOP Ranch was located in what is currently the northernmost portion of the present-day Chico Basin Ranch.

The HOP Ranch was named for the three original partners – H for William T. Hurd, Superintendent of the Michigan Central Railroad stockyards in Detroit; O for William HOlmes of Wayland, Massachusetts, a six-year veteran merchant seaman and mate who had sailed aboard clipper ships throughout the world; and P for Samuel A. Plumer – a successful real estate investor and financier also of Detroit.

== Cattle operations ==
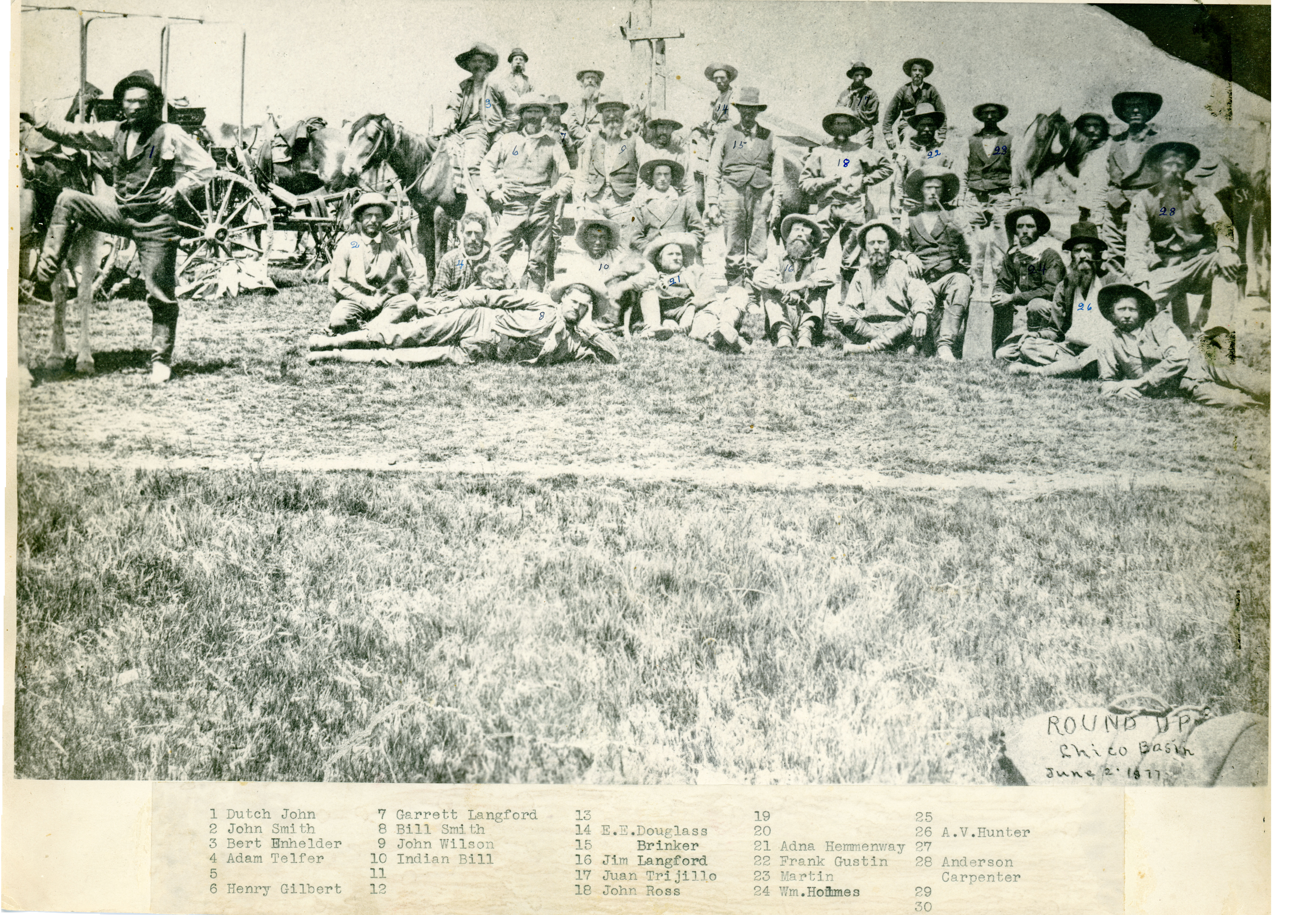
1877 photograph of cowboys after participating in the Chico Basin Roundup at the HOP Ranch near Hanover, Colorado.

Hurd, Holmes, and Plumer formed a partnership in Detroit to establish a livestock enterprise in cattle and ventured to Denver, Colorado in 1871. From there they took a wagon to Fountain, Colorado where they located, established, and purchased rights to the land which would eventually become the HOP Ranch. William Holmes remained in Colorado to become the on-site ranch manager while Hurd and Plumer returned to their home base in Detroit.

William Holmes homesteaded much of the land that would eventually become the HOP ranch. Other properties were also added by private acquisition of William T. Hurd. In 1884, the business partnership of the three men was formally incorporated in Detroit, Michigan as the HOP Livestock Company, Inc. Officers of the corporation were Samuel A. Plumer, President; William Holmes, Vice President and Superintendent; and William T. Hurd, Secretary and Treasurer. Much of the land acquired through homesteading and through private acquisition was deeded to the HOP Livestock Company.

In its early days of operation, the HOP Ranch shipped cattle to market from the nearest railhead in Hugo, Colorado for delivery to Kansas City and Chicago. Later when the railroad reached Pueblo, Colorado, cattle were shipped to market from nearby Fountain, Colorado. During typical ranch operating years, HOP Ranch would ship as many as one-thousand head of cattle to market. William Holmes and his younger brother James were among the first to import Hereford cattle to Colorado when they shipped a dozen well-selected cattle, mostly bulls, from Canada in 1874. After a visit to the ranch in October 1878, Wm. T. Hurd and his wife departed to winter in the east. Upon their departure, it was thought he and the Holmes brothers had "the finest lot of Hereford cattle in Colorado." On October 30, they shipped to market "the finest lot of half blood Herefords that were ever shipped from the state." This hearty breed of white-faced cattle would dominate the Colorado ranching landscape just a few decades later.

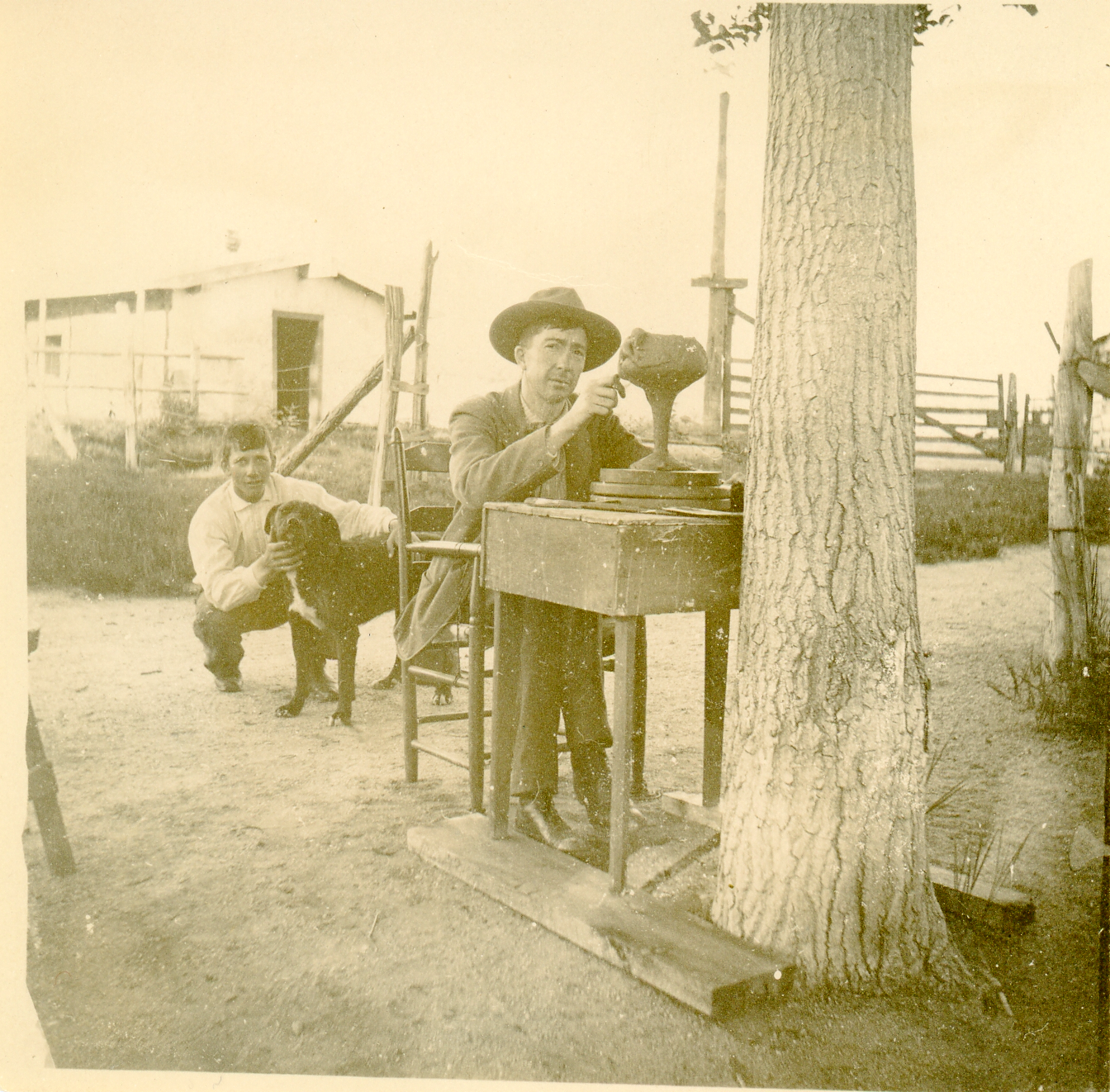
Artus Van Briggle, potter, with W.C. Holmes and his dog, Curly, at work on the HOP (Holmes) Ranch in 1900, near Hanover, Colorado. Van Briggle is working on the Toast Cup. Taken by Agnes E. Holmes, sister of W. C. Holmes.

== Dangers ==
When the HOP Ranch was founded in 1871, living on the Colorado prairie was a dangerous prospect. Relations between settlers and Native-Americans were tense and there was an undercurrent of deep mistrust over land ownership. Unscrupulous persons went to the American Old West to avoid the law, and others that took advantage of a perceived lack of law. Even the natural elements presented hazards. In November 1864, 100 miles due east of the Chico Basin, Colonel John Chivington led roughly 675 US volunteer soldiers in an attack on a Cheyenne and Arapaho village of about 700 people. In the end, approximately 200 Native-Americans were killed, most of them noncombatant women, children, and elderly. Then a few years later, in September 1868, members of the US Army and of several tribes of Plains Indians became involved in the Battle of Beecher Island near Wray, Colorado, about 200 miles northeast of the Chico Basin. The battle turned into a nine-day siege and by its end, a few dozen Army soldiers and Plains Indian warriors were killed and many others wounded. Both of these events were important incidents, among others, that preceded Custer's Last Stand in the Battle of the Little Bighorn in southern Montana in June 1876.

In this era of the Old West, it was a time when disagreements among neighbors were often settled with personal firearms instead of waiting for the slow arm of the law. With the advent of cattle and beef production in the west came the scourge of cattle rustling that cattlemen would not abide. Sometimes suspicions among neighbors ran high, particularly in the time of the open range before fences were erected. In one incident at Chico Basin in October 1876, William Wilson, an innocent teenage boy, unknowingly walked into a boundary dispute between neighbors and was murdered. William Holmes and William T. Hurd, visiting from Detroit, were both part of a coroner's inquest to resolve the particulars of the shooting.

Even the natural elements of the Old West presented danger to those who settled the prairie—unique because of the open somewhat barren landscape. In December 1880, after a visit to the HOP Ranch, Samuel A. Plumer told of an account where William Holmes had gone to the post office in Pueblo and upon his return stopped to repair a fence. While making the repair, he was struck by lightning — it was a cloudy day, but no thunderstorms were occurring. His recovery from the electrical shock took days.

== Ranch culture ==
The HOP Ranch had a colorful history in the early pioneering days of Colorado Springs and Pueblo. Despite the tensions on the Colorado plains, the Holmes family befriended Southern Ute Native Americans who passed by on their way to hunting grounds. They established a ritual to feed them biscuits and lent them field glasses and rifles for their hunting expeditions. Friendly bow and arrow and rifle sporting competitions were also common.

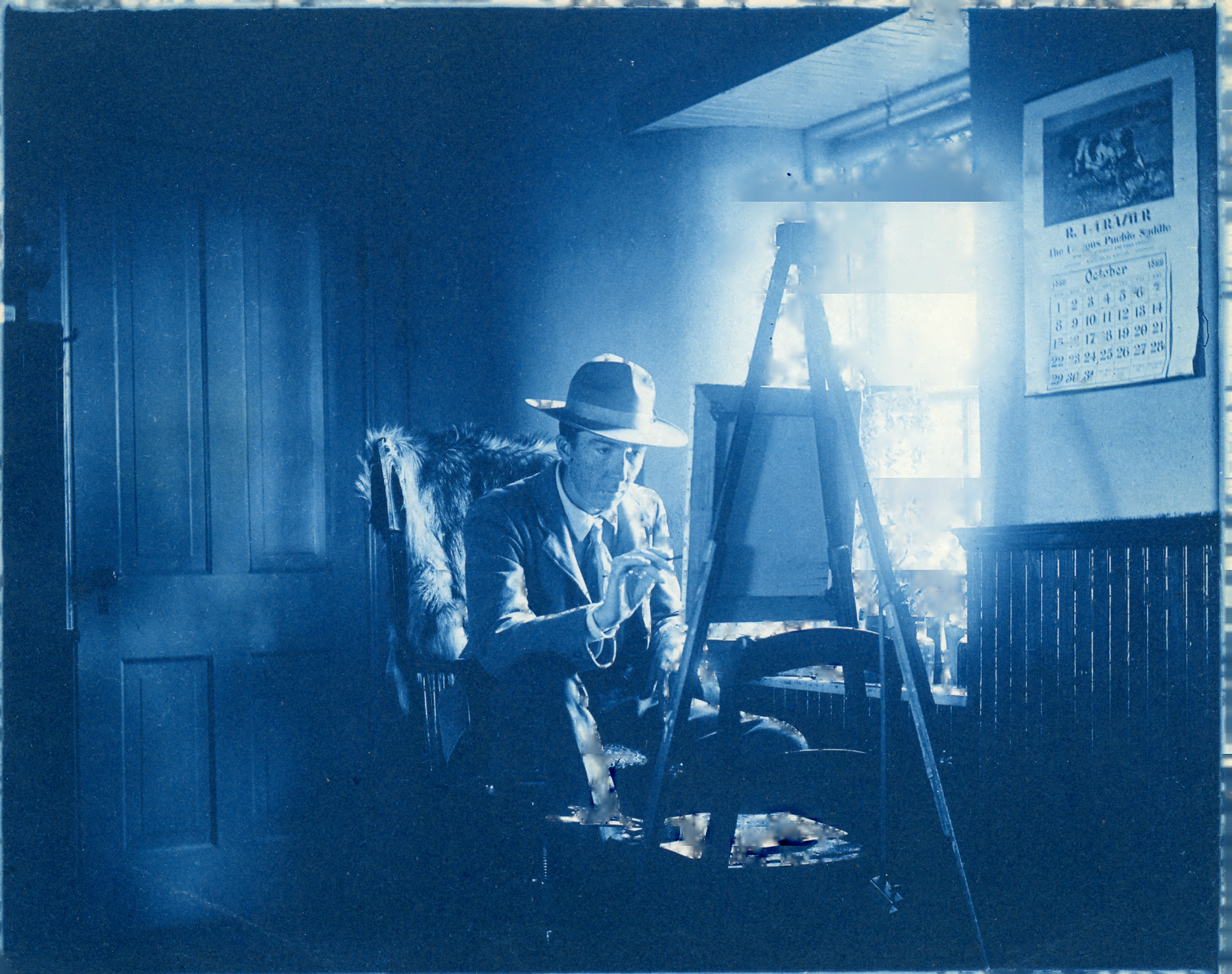
Photo of Artus Van Briggle painting at the Holmes house at the HOP Ranch 20 miles southeast of Fountain, Colorado. The calendar in the background says R. T. Frazier, The Famous Pueblo Saddle, October 1899.

The Holmes family also befriended up-and-coming artist and potter, Artus Van Briggle, who came to Colorado in March 1899 to recover from symptoms of tuberculosis. Van Briggle had first stayed in Colorado Springs with a friend of his, Asaheal Sutton, who worked at a local bank. One day while at the bank, Mr. Sutton inquired if the Holmes's might care for a sick man. Artus Van Briggle came to stay with them at the HOP Ranch. during the summers of 1899, 1900, and 1901 to reduce work stress and gather strength. (See Tuberculosis treatment in Colorado Springs).

During his summers at HOP Ranch, interspersed with time at Colorado College and in Colorado Springs during other parts of the year, Van Briggle pursued his quest to identify potting soils so "the lost art of the Chinese might be revived." He sought to re-create the dull satin matte glaze of Chinese potters of the 14th-century Ming Dynasty. In 1901, Van Briggle had a major breakthrough perfecting his process. (Note: "Artus Van Briggle was truly a master artisan and a giant in American art pottery. While highly talented as a painter, he is best known for his sculpture and designs in clay, which he combined with his rediscovery of a formula for a dead matte glaze which had eluded makers of artistic pottery since the Chinese pottery of the Ming Dynasty.") In August he invited friends to visit his studio at HOP Ranch where he personalized some of the newly modeled pieces by impressing their initials in them. Van Briggle went on to enter his very best work in major exhibits at the Paris Salon of 1903, the 1904 Louisiana Purchase Exposition in St. Louis and the 1905 Lewis and Clark Centennial Exposition in Portland. He garnered three gold, one silver, and a number of bronze medals. These awards propelled him to international acclaim. He went on to found the Van Briggle Pottery and had a significant impact on the Art Nouveau movement in the United States. His pottery is foundational to American art pottery. (Note: Van Briggle called "leading figure" in American Art Nouveau movement.) (Note: "Revolutionized art pottery") (Note: "One of most famous factories") (Note: "won major awards...short but influential life") (Note: "renowned in the 1890s for the beauty of the designs of their art nouveau pottery") (Note: "Artus Van Briggle made (art nouveau) tiles famous in 1899") (Note: "received splendid reception throughout Europe and the United States") The Art Nouveau style favored by its founders continues to influence the pottery's designs.
