= Standley Lake =

Reservoir in Westminster, Colorado, United States

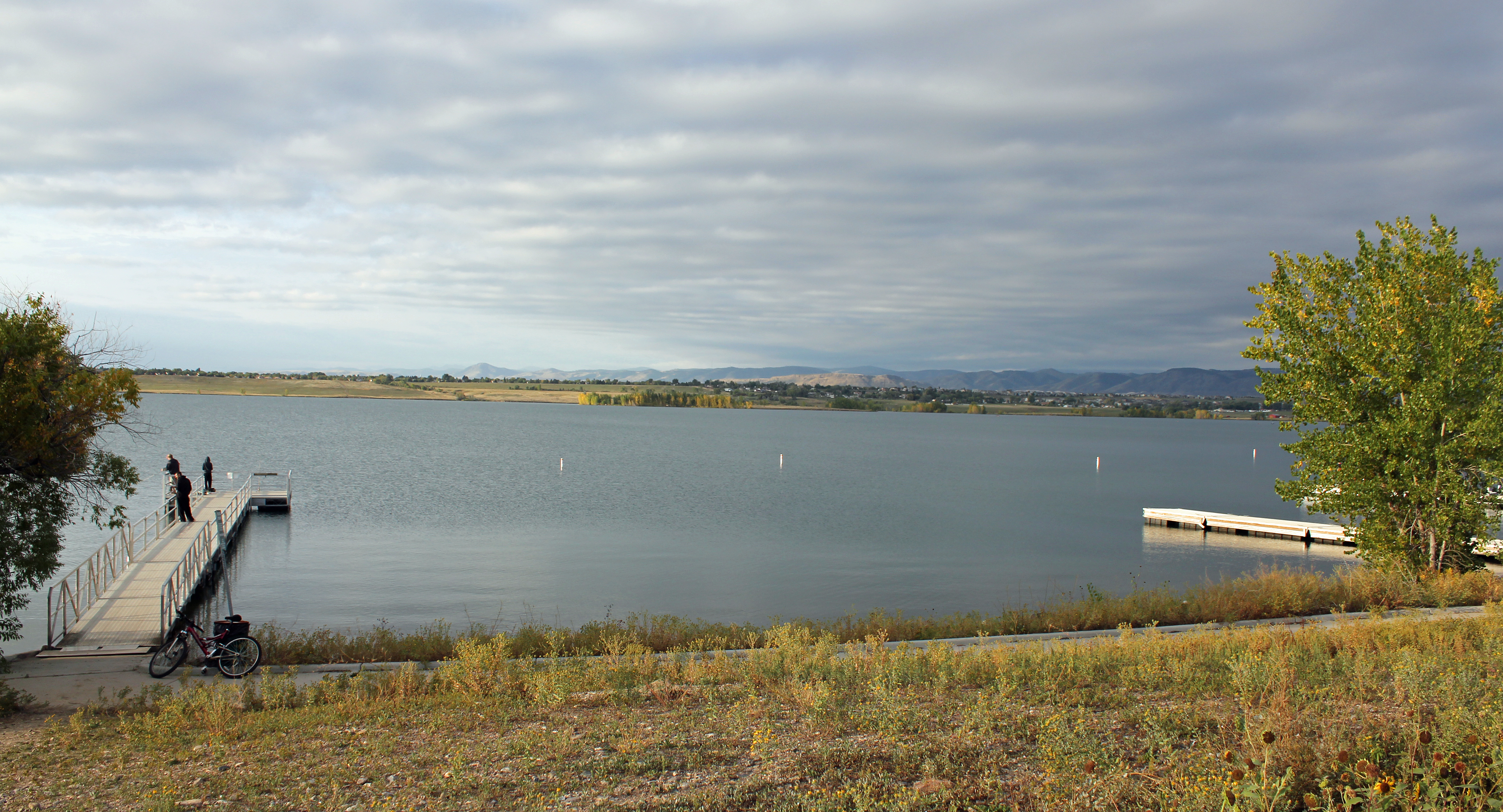
- The lake in 2014.

- Location within Colorado Location within the United States
- Location: Westminster, Colorado, Jefferson County, Colorado
- Coordinates: 39°51′45″N 105°07′30″W
- Type: Reservoir
- Primary inflows: Woman Creek, Croke Canal, Farmers Highline Canal
- Primary outflows: Big Dry Creek (Westminster, Colorado)
- Basin countries: United States
- Surface area: 1,200 acres (490 ha)
- Water volume: 42,000 acre-feet (52,000,000 m^{3})
- Surface elevation: 5,506 feet (1,678 m)

Standley Lake is a 1,200-acre (4.9 km^{2}) reservoir located in Westminster, Colorado. While originally constructed to provide water for the agricultural irrigation of the surrounding region northwest of Denver, it now serves primarily as the municipal water supply for the cities of Westminster, Northglenn, and Thornton. The lake is also used for recreation, and is the prominent feature of the surrounding 3,000-acre (12 km^{2}) Standley Lake Regional Park.

The reservoir has a maximum capacity of approximately 42,000 acre-feet (52,000,000 m^{3}) and maximum depth of 96 feet (29 m). Most of the reservoir's water is transported over 16 miles (26 km) from Clear Creek to the south by way of the Church Ditch, Farmer's Highline Canal and Croke Canal. It also receives water from Coal Creek by way of the Kinnear Ditch and from Woman Creek.

The lake is owned by the Farmers Reservoir and Irrigation Company (FRICO) while the surrounding park and the recreational use of the lake are managed by the City of Westminster.

== History ==
Around 1870, John S. Kinnear filed a homestead claim on part of the land which would become Standley Lake, and constructed Kinnear Ditch to bring water from Coal Creek to fill a reservoir on his land. By the 1890s the Kinnear Reservoir was owned by Thomas P. Croke. In 1902 Croke joined with Joseph A. Standley, for whom the lake is named, and Milton Smith to incorporate the Farmers Reservoir and Irrigation Company, with the purpose of constructing a system of canals and reservoirs to irrigate the farmland north of Denver. Ottawa Joseph ("O.J.") Standley, vice-president of Chicago Title and Trust, had plans to build a reservoir in the Barr Lake area. However, together with Croke, he decided to greatly enlarge the Kinnear Reservoir instead.

Initial plans called for a 100,000 acre-feet (120,000,000 m^{3}) lake and a 140 foot (43 m) high dam, which would have been the largest earth-filled dam in the world. These plans were revised down during construction, however, with the intention of raising the dam later to its full capacity. Construction began in 1907 and was completed in May 1912. In 1913 cracks began to appear in the dam, and a major slide occurred on the downstream face in 1914. This was repaired immediately. In 1916 there was another major slide, this time on the upstream face of the dam. This was not repaired until 1922. In 1963 an agreement between the city of Westminster and FRICO gave Westminster 12,000 acre-feet (15,000,000 m^{3}) of storage in Standley Lake, and the city expanded the reservoir's dam to enlarge the lake to its current capacity of 42,000 acre-feet (52,000,000 m^{3}).

This agreement was the beginning of several years of competition, distrust and lawsuits as Westminster competed with FRICO and other towns for Clear Creek Water. The original dispute began with Westminster, Northglenn, and Broomfield over revenues from building industrial complexes that were in un-incorporated areas near Westminster. Westminster was the only one with enough water to serve new companies. There were two things that fueled this bitter dispute; each city's heavy investment in or desire for utilities and the Colorado annexation law. Commerce City and Arvada entered the dispute later. By 1971 Westminster had quelled most of the land battles. In 1978 FRICO and the City of Westminster sat down and settled the "Flip Flop Suit," giving Westminster the right to carry over unused water, thus increasing the city's water supply at no additional cost.

In 1988 the Standley Lake Task Force was formed by the City of Westminster and Jefferson County. In April 1998, Jefferson County Open Space (JCOS) and FRICO finalized several years of negotiations and reached an agreement for the purchase of the land and recreation rights surrounding Standley Lake. JCOS then deeded all property owned at that time to the City of Westminster for the purpose of upgrading and maintaining Standley Lake as a regional park. JCOS also contributed $2.4 Million to be used for improvements which included a boat ramp, campground, restroom facilities, fish cleaning station, ranger station/visitor center, access roads and trail system. The area was designated a Regional Park in 1998.

Standley Lake was historically affected by runoff from the Rocky Flats Plant via Woman Creek, which drains about 35% of the site. Contaminants, including plutonium, tritium, and nitrates, were released between 1952 and 1989. While most plutonium settled in creek beds and reservoir sediments due to its low solubility, concerns about contamination led to the construction of the Woman Creek Reservoir in 1996 to intercept runoff and protect Standley Lake. Surface water monitoring following closure of the plant, conducted by entities such as the Colorado Department of Public Health and Environment and local municipalities, indicates that risks to drinking water remain minimal under existing management measures.

In December 2019, Westminster banned trailered boats on Standley Lake in its fight against invasive mussels from other states. The move came after a temporary ban in March and months of further consideration.

== See also ==
- List of dams and reservoirs in Colorado
