= Scientific and Cultural Facilities District =

Denver, Colorado area tax district

The Scientific and Cultural Facilities District (SCFD) is a special regional tax district of the State of Colorado that provides funding for art, music, theater, dance, zoology, botany, natural history, or cultural history organizations in the Denver Metropolitan Area.

In 1988, voters in the Denver region created the SCFD to provide a consistent source of unrestricted funding to scientific and cultural organizations. The SCFD is funded by a 0.1% sales and use tax that provided funding to 240 organizations in 2015.

The district comprises seven counties in the Denver Metropolitan Area: Adams, Arapahoe, Boulder, Broomfield, Denver, Douglas, and Jefferson.

- It is a 0.1% retail sales and uses tax (one penny on every $10).
- According to the Colorado statute, the SCFD distributes the money to local organizations on an annual basis. These organizations must provide for the enlightenment and entertainment of the public through the production, presentation, exhibition, advancement, or preservation of art, music, theater, dance, zoology, botany, natural history, or cultural history.
- As directed by statute, SCFD recipient organizations are currently divided into three "tiers" among which receipts are allocated by percentage.
  - Tier I includes regional organizations: the Denver Art Museum, the Denver Botanic Gardens, the Denver Museum of Nature and Science, the Denver Zoo, and the Denver Center for the Performing Arts. It receives 65.5%.
  - Tier II currently includes 26 regional organizations. Tier II receives 21%.
  - Tier III has more than 280 local organizations such as small theaters, orchestras, art centers, natural history, cultural history, and community groups. Tier III organizations apply for funding from the county cultural councils via a grant process. This tier receives 13.5%.
- An 11-member board of directors oversees the distributions by the Colorado Revised Statutes. Seven board members are appointed by county commissioners (in Denver, the Denver City Council) and four members are appointed by the Governor of Colorado.

Every twelve years, voters in the district decide whether to renew the district or to dissolve it. Most recently, in 2016 voters opted to renew the district for the period 2018 to 2030.

== Organizations funded ==
In 2022, 299 organizations were funded in whole or in part by the SCFD, including:

- Bird Conservancy of the Rockies
- Colorado Railroad Museum
- Colorado Symphony
- Clyfford Still Museum
- Denver Art Museum
- Denver Botanic Gardens
- Denver Center for the Performing Arts
- Denver Museum of Nature and Science
- Denver Zoo
- eTown
- Hudson Gardens
- Wings Over the Rockies Air and Space Museum

== See also ==
- Topic overview:
  - Colorado
  - Outline of Colorado
  - Index of Colorado-related articles
