= Big Dry Creek (Westminster, Colorado) =

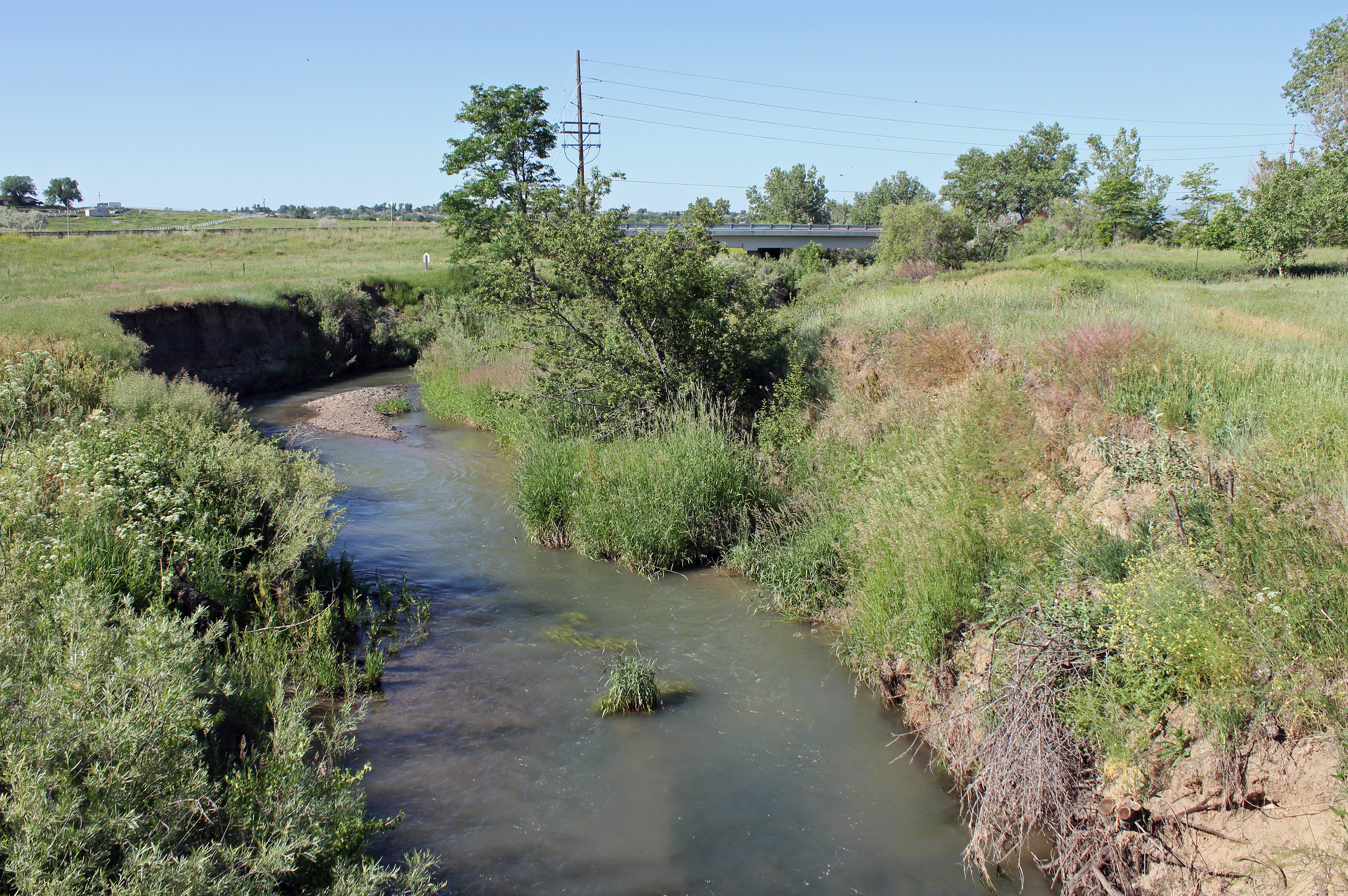
- The creek just north of West 120th Avenue.

Physical characteristics
- Source
  - coordinates: 39°52′03″N 105°13′49″W
- Mouth
  - location: Confluence with the South Platte
  - coordinates: 40°04′21″N 104°49′37″W
  - elevation: 4,895 ft (1,492 m)
- Basin size: 110 mi^{2} (280 km^{2})

Basin features
- Progression: South Platte—Platte— Missouri—Mississippi

Big Dry Creek is a tributary that joins the South Platte River near Fort Lupton, Colorado. It rises in Jefferson County, Colorado at the mouth of Coal Creek Canyon at an elevation of 8,000 feet (2,400 m).

The creek flows through Jefferson, Adams, and Weld counties. In Jefferson County, it flows into and out of Standley Lake. It receives treated wastewater from several municipalities, including the City and County of Broomfield, Westminster, Thornton and Northglenn.

The Big Dry Creek Watershed Association, a non-profit organization made up of individuals and representatives from local municipalities, monitors the creek's conditions.

A second creek in the Denver Metropolitan Area shares the same name. The other Big Dry Creek rises in Douglas County and joins the South Platte River in Littleton.

The Big Dry Creek Trail, a recreation trail, roughly follows the creek from Standley Lake Regional Park to Interstate 25.

== See also ==
- List of rivers of Colorado
- Big Dry Creek (Littleton, Colorado)
