= Barr Lake State Park =

State park in Colorado, United States

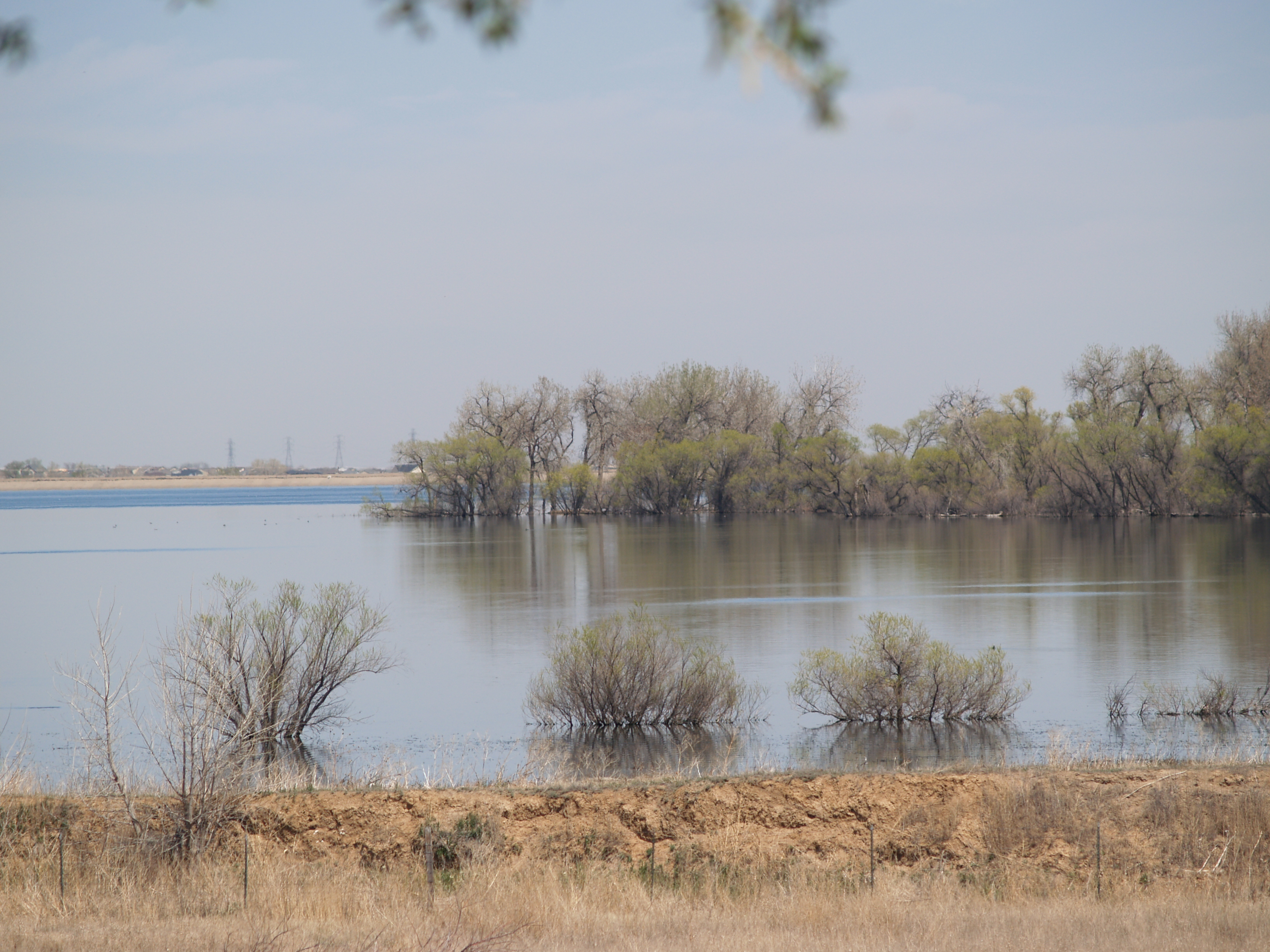

- Location within Colorado
- Location: Adams County, Colorado, USA
- Nearest city: Brighton, Colorado
- Coordinates: 39°56′15″N 104°45′05″W
- Area: 2,715 acres (10.99 km^{2})
- Established: 1977
- Visitors: 250,176 (in 2021)
- Governing body: Colorado Parks and Wildlife

Barr Lake State Park is a Colorado state park established in 1977 in Adams County near Brighton, Colorado, USA. The 2,715-acre (10.99 km^{2}) park has 12 miles (19 km) of trails, including an 8.8-mile (14.2 km) trail that circles Barr Lake. Fishing and boating are allowed in the northern half of the park. The southern half is a wildlife refuge, with several wildlife viewing stations and a nature center. Numerous bald eagles spend the winter at Barr Lake and one pair nests every year. The park is popular with birders; over 350 species have been observed.

The headquarters of the Bird Conservancy of the Rockies is inside the park on the northwest side of the lake.

Barr Lake is fed by the Burlington Ditch, which is diverted from the South Platte River.

The namesake Barr Lake derives its name from one Mr. Barr, a railroad official.
