= Bird Conservancy of the Rockies =

US non-profit organization

- Formation: 1988; 38 years ago
- Type: Nonprofit
- Tax ID no.: 84-1079882
- Registration no.: CO ID #98-08556-0000
- Legal status: 501(c)(3)
- Headquarters: Brighton, Colorado, US
- Board Chair: Eileen Dey
- Executive Director: Tammy VerCauteren
- Website: www.birdconservancy.org
- Formerly called: Rocky Mountain Bird Observatory; Colorado Bird Observatory

The Bird Conservancy of the Rockies addresses bird conservation needs in the Western United States. Founded in 1988 as Colorado Bird Observatory and later changed to Rocky Mountain Bird Observatory, its headquarters are located in Barr Lake State Park, just east of Brighton, Colorado, United States. In 2015 the organization changed to its current name in order to more accurately reflect the regions of its work, which radiates from Colorado to the Great Plains, Mexico and beyond.

The observatory's programs are supported by grants from foundations, federal and state agencies, the Denver metro area's Scientific and Cultural Facilities District, Adams County Cultural Council, Great Outdoors Colorado Trust Fund, and contributions from RMBO members.
