= Chico Creek =

Physical characteristics
- Source
  - coordinates: 38°45′50″N 104°33′14″W
- Mouth
  - location: Confluence with Arkansas
  - coordinates: 38°14′33″N 104°21′57″W
  - elevation: 4,505 ft (1,373 m)
- Basin size: 747 mi^{2} (1,930 km^{2})

Basin features
- Progression: Arkansas—Mississippi

Chico Creek is a 53.9-mile-long (86.7 km) tributary of the Arkansas River that flows from a source in El Paso County, Colorado. It joins the Arkansas in Pueblo County just west of the town of Avondale.

== See also ==
- List of rivers of Colorado
