= Southern Rocky Mountains =

Major subrange of the Rocky Mountains in the Western United States

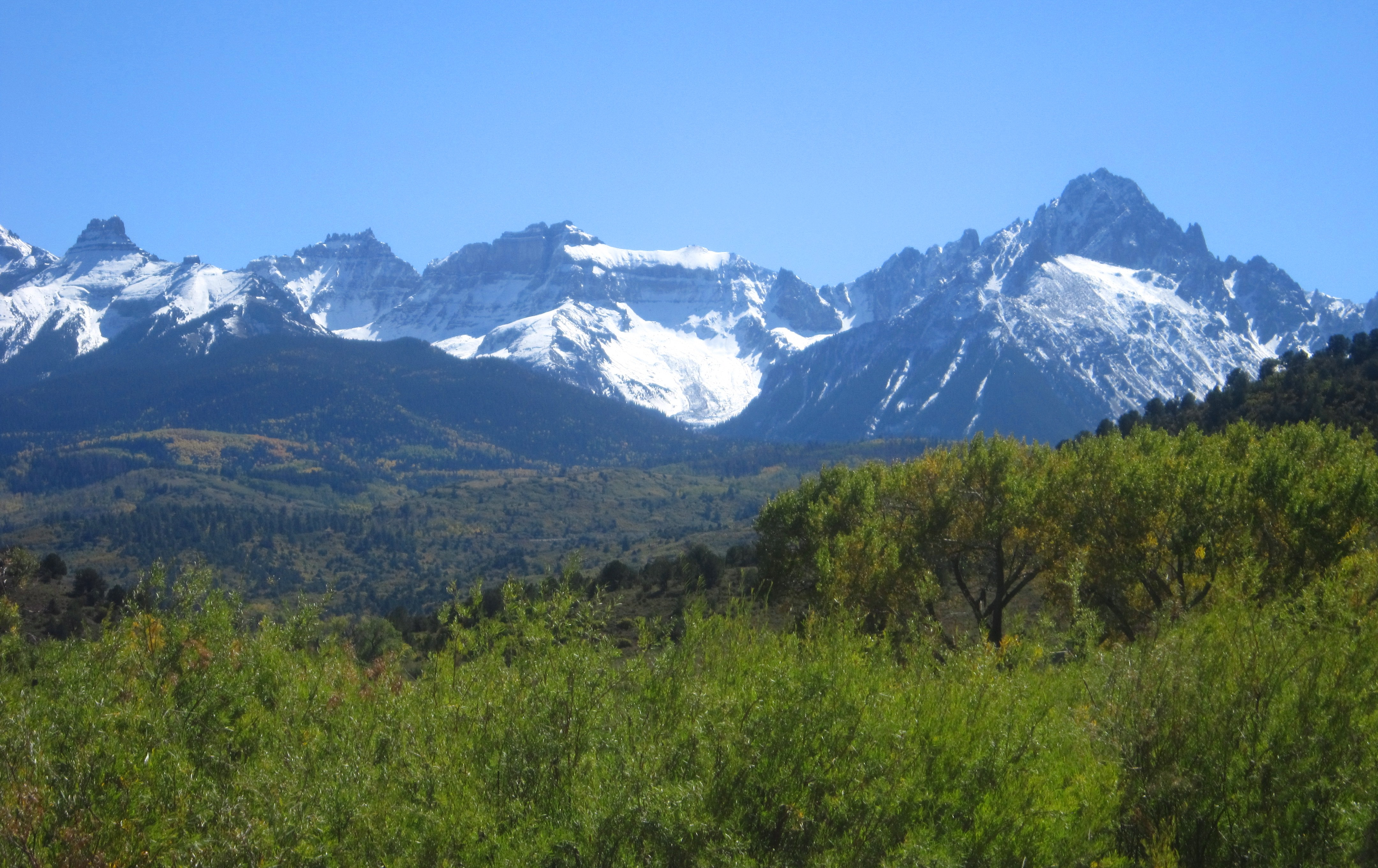
- Sneffels Range in Colorado.

Highest point
- Peak: Mount Elbert
- Elevation: 14,440 ft (4,400 m)
- Coordinates: 39.1178°N 106.4454°W

Geography
- Country: United States
- States: Colorado, New Mexico, Utah and Wyoming
- Parent range: Rocky Mountains

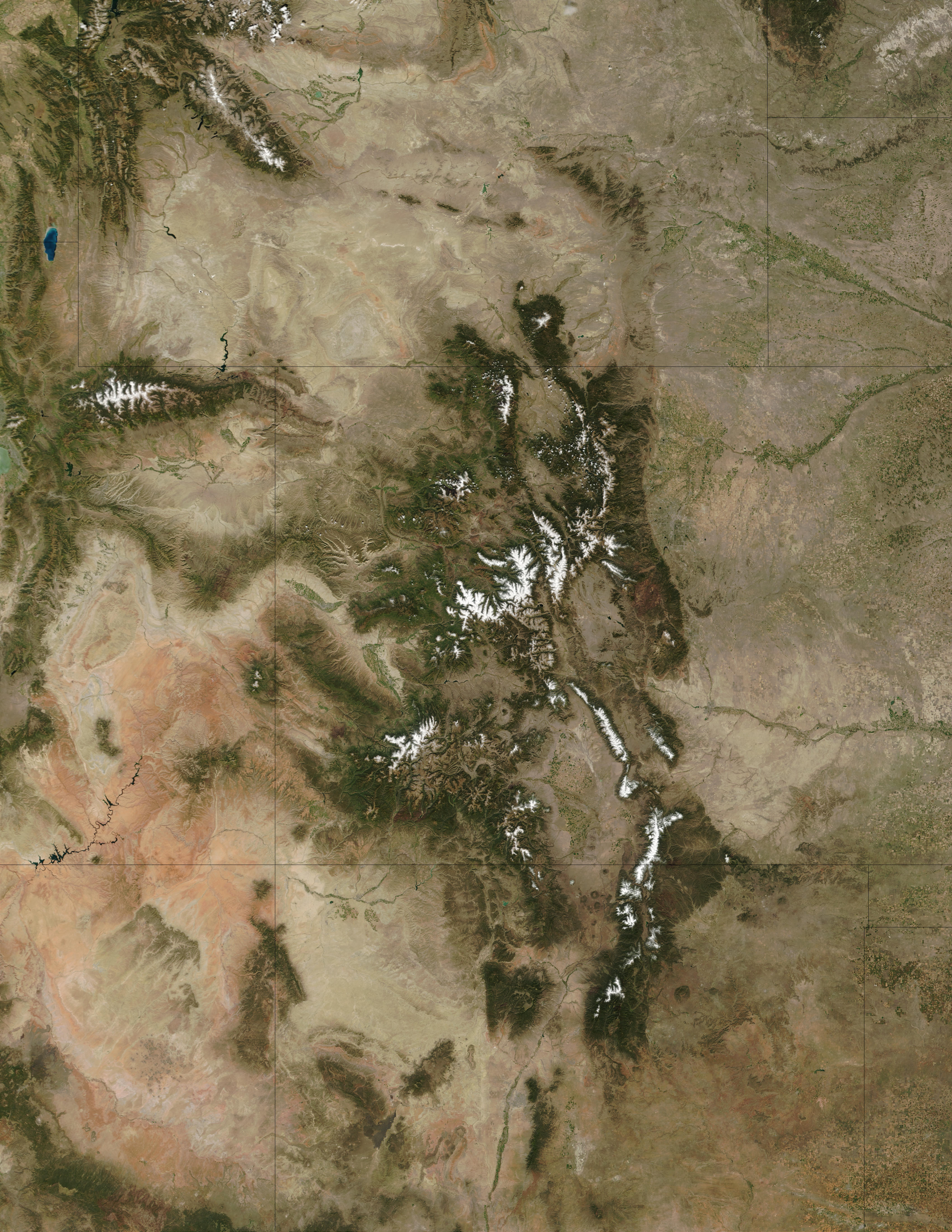
Satellite photograph of the Southern Rocky Mountains of the United States.

The Southern Rocky Mountains are a major subregion of the Rocky Mountains of North America located in the southeastern portion of the U.S. state of Wyoming, the central and western portions of Colorado, the northern portion of New Mexico, and extreme eastern portions of Utah. The Southern Rocky Mountains are also commonly known as the Southern Rockies, and since the highest peaks are located in the State of Colorado, they are sometimes known as the Colorado Rockies, although many important ranges and peaks rise in the other three states. The Southern Rockies include the highest mountain ranges of the Rocky Mountains and include all 30 of the highest major peaks of the Rockies.

The Southern Rocky Mountains are generally divided from the Western Rocky Mountains by the Green River and the Colorado River below the Green River. The Southern Rockies are divided from the Central Rocky Mountains by South Pass in Wyoming and the drainage running east from the pass down the Sweetwater River and the North Platte River; and the drainage running southwest from the pass down Pacific Creek and Sandy Creek to the Green River. This divide between the Southern Rockies and the Central Rockies provided the lowest elevation traverse of the Rocky Mountain region for the historic Oregon Trail, the Mormon Trail, and the California Trail. The southern end of the Rocky Mountains are considered to be the Jemez Mountains and the southern Sangre de Cristo Mountains of New Mexico. Mountains south of here in N.M. are classified as the Arizona/New Mexico Mountains ecoregion using the EPA Ecoregions System.

This article defines a significant summit as a summit with at least 100 meters (330 feet) of topographic prominence, and a major summit as a summit with at least 500 meters (1,600 feet) of topographic prominence. An ultra-prominent summit is a summit with at least 1,500 meters (4,900 feet) of topographic prominence.

All elevations in this article include an elevation adjustment from the National Geodetic Vertical Datum of 1929 (NGVD 29) to the North American Vertical Datum of 1988 (NAVD 88). For further information, please see this United States National Geodetic Survey note.

== Mountain ranges ==
The following table lists the mountain ranges and subranges of the Southern Rocky Mountains with their highest summit.

Mountain Ranges of the Southern Rocky Mountains
Mountain range				Highest summit			
primary	secondary	tertiary	states	Summit name	Elevation	Prominence	Isolation
Sawatch Range	Central Sawatch Range	Elbert Massif	Colorado	Mount Elbert (Note: The summit of Mount Elbert is the highest point of the Rocky Mountains and the State of Colorado.) (Note: The elevation of Mount Elbert includes an adjustment of +1.995 m (6.55 ft) from NGVD 29 to NAVD 88.)	14,440 ft 4401 m	9,093 ft 2772 m	671 mi 1,079 km
Sawatch Range	Central Sawatch Range	Massive Massif	Colorado	Mount Massive (Note: Mount Massive the second highest peak of the Rocky Mountains.) (Note: The elevation of Mount Massive includes an adjustment of +2.086 m (6.84 ft) from NGVD 29 to NAVD 88.)	14,424 ft 4396.3 m	1,978 ft 603 m	5.1 mi 8.21 km
Sawatch Range	Central Sawatch Range	Collegiate Peaks	Colorado	Mount Harvard (Note: The summit of Mount Harvard is the highest point of the Collegiate Peaks.) (Note: The elevation of Mount Harvard includes an adjustment of +2.084 m (6.84 ft) from NGVD 29 to NAVD 88.)	14,421 ft 4396 m	2,327 ft 709 m	14.92 mi 24 km
Sawatch Range	Central Sawatch Range	Williams Mountains	Colorado	Bill Williams Peak (Note: The summit of Bill Williams Peak is the highest point of the Williams Mountains.) (Note: The elevation of Bill Williams Peak includes an adjustment of +2.044 m (6.71 ft) from NGVD 29 to NAVD 88.)	13,389 ft 4081 m	1,682 ft 513 m	3.73 mi 6 km
Sawatch Range	Southern Sawatch Range		Colorado	Mount Antero (Note: The summit of Mount Antero is the highest point of the southern Sawatch Range.) (Note: The elevation of Mount Antero includes an adjustment of +2.072 m (6.8 ft) from NGVD 29 to NAVD 88.)	14,276 ft 4351 m	2,503 ft 763 m	17.75 mi 28.6 km
Sawatch Range	Southern Sawatch Range	Far Southern Sawatch Range	Colorado	Mount Ouray (Note: The summit of Mount Ouray is the highest point of the far southern Sawatch Range.) (Note: The elevation of Mount Ouray includes an adjustment of +1.871 m (6.14 ft) from NGVD 29 to NAVD 88.)	13,961 ft 4255 m	2,659 ft 810 m	13.58 mi 21.9 km
Sawatch Range	Northern Sawatch Range		Colorado	Mount of the Holy Cross (Note: The summit of Mount of the Holy Cross is the highest point of the northern Sawatch Range.) (Note: The summit elevation of Mount of the Holy Cross includes a vertical offset of +0.6 m (2 ft) from the station benchmark.) (Note: The elevation of Mount of the Holy Cross includes an adjustment of +1.927 m (6.32 ft) from NGVD 29 to NAVD 88.)	14,011 ft 4271 m	2,111 ft 643 m	18.52 mi 29.8 km
Sangre de Cristo Mountains	Sierra Blanca Massif		Colorado	Blanca Peak (Note: The summit of Blanca Peak is the highest point of Sierra Blanca and the Sangre de Cristo Range.) (Note: The elevation of Blanca Peak includes an adjustment of +1.755 m (5.76 ft) from NGVD 29 to NAVD 88.)	14,357 ft 4376 m	5,326 ft 1623 m	103.4 mi 166.4 km
Sangre de Cristo Mountains	Northern Sangre de Cristo Range	Crestones	Colorado	Crestone Peak (Note: The summit of Crestone Peak is the highest point of the northern Sangre de Cristo Range.) (Note: The elevation of Crestone Peak includes an adjustment of +1.76 m (5.77 ft) from NGVD 29 to NAVD 88.)	14,300 ft 4359 m	4,554 ft 1388 m	27.4 mi 44.1 km
Sangre de Cristo Mountains	Northern Sangre de Cristo Range		Colorado	Rito Alto Peak (Note: The elevation of Rito Alto Peak includes an adjustment of +1.808 m (5.93 ft) from NGVD 29 to NAVD 88.)	13,800 ft 4206 m	1,134 ft 346 m	7.28 mi 11.71 km
Sangre de Cristo Mountains	Culebra Range		Colorado & New Mexico	Culebra Peak (Note: The summit of Culebra Peak is the highest point of the Culebra Range.) (Note: The elevation of Culebra Peak includes an adjustment of +1.74 m (5.71 ft) from NGVD 29 to NAVD 88.)	14,053 ft 4283 m	4,827 ft 1471 m	35.5 mi 57.1 km
Sangre de Cristo Mountains	Culebra Range	Spanish Peaks	Colorado	West Spanish Peak (Note: The summit of West Spanish Peak is the highest point of the Spanish Peaks and the easternmost 4,000 meters (13,000 feet) summit of the United States.) (Note: The elevation of West Spanish Peak includes an adjustment of +1.468 m (4.82 ft) from NGVD 29 to NAVD 88.)	13,631 ft 4155 m	3,686 ft 1123 m	20.4 mi 32.9 km
Sangre de Cristo Mountains	Taos Mountains		New Mexico	Wheeler Peak (Note: The summit of Wheeler Peak is the highest point of the Taos Mountains and the State of New Mexico.) (Note: The elevation of Wheeler Peak includes an adjustment of +1.631 m (5.35 ft) from NGVD 29 to NAVD 88.)	13,167 ft 4013 m	3,409 ft 1039 m	37.4 mi 60.1 km
Sangre de Cristo Mountains	Santa Fe Mountains		New Mexico	Truchas Peak (Note: The summit of Truchas Peak is the highest point of the Santa Fe Mountains.) (Note: The elevation of Truchas Peak includes an adjustment of +1.478 m (4.85 ft) from NGVD 29 to NAVD 88.)	13,108 ft 3995 m	4,001 ft 1220 m	42.4 mi 68.2 km
Sangre de Cristo Mountains	Cimarron Range, New Mexico		New Mexico	Baldy Mountain (Note: The summit of Baldy Mountain is the highest point of the Cimarron Range.) (Note: The elevation of Baldy Mountain includes an adjustment of +1.383 m (4.54 ft) from NGVD 29 to NAVD 88.)	12,445 ft 3793 m	2,701 ft 823 m	11.33 mi 18.24 km
Sangre de Cristo Mountains	Wet Mountains		Colorado	Greenhorn Mountain (Note: The summit of Greenhorn Mountain is the highest point of the Wet Mountains.) (Note: The elevation of Greenhorn Mountain includes an adjustment of +1.401 m (4.6 ft) from NGVD 29 to NAVD 88.)	12,352 ft 3765 m	3,777 ft 1151 m	25.6 mi 41.2 km
Sangre de Cristo Mountains	Southern Sangre de Cristo Range		New Mexico	Cerro Vista (Note: The summit of Cerro Vista is the highest point of the southern Sangre de Cristo Range.) (Note: The elevation of Cerro Vista includes an adjustment of +1.441 m (4.73 ft) from NGVD 29 to NAVD 88.)	11,937 ft 3638 m	2,519 ft 768 m	14.19 mi 22.8 km
San Juan Mountains	North Central San Juan Mountains		Colorado	Uncompahgre Peak (Note: The summit of Uncompahgre Peak is the highest point of the San Juan Mountains.) (Note: The elevation of Uncompahgre Peak includes an adjustment of +1.967 m (6.45 ft) from NGVD 29 to NAVD 88.)	14,321 ft 4365 m	4,277 ft 1304 m	85.1 mi 136.9 km
San Juan Mountains	San Miguel Mountains		Colorado	Mount Wilson (Note: The summit of Mount Wilson is the highest point of the San Miguel Mountains.) (Note: The elevation of Mount Wilson includes an adjustment of +1.899 m (6.23 ft) from NGVD 29 to NAVD 88.)	14,252 ft 4344 m	4,024 ft 1227 m	33.1 mi 53.2 km
San Juan Mountains	Sneffels Range		Colorado	Mount Sneffels (Note: The summit of Mount Sneffels is the highest point of the Sneffels Range.) (Note: The elevation of Mount Sneffels includes an adjustment of +1.879 m (6.16 ft) from NGVD 29 to NAVD 88.)	14,158 ft 4315 m	3,050 ft 930 m	15.73 mi 25.3 km
San Juan Mountains	Needle Mountains		Colorado	Mount Eolus (Note: The summit of Mount Eolus is the highest point of the Needle Mountains.) (Note: The elevation of Mount Eolus includes an adjustment of +1.756 m (5.76 ft) from NGVD 29 to NAVD 88.)	14,089 ft 4294 m	2,183 ft 665 m	15.63 mi 25.2 km
San Juan Mountains	Needle Mountains	Grenadier Range	Colorado	Vestal Peak (Note: The summit of Vestal Peak is the highest point of the Grenadier Range.) (Note: The elevation of Vestal Peak includes an adjustment of +1.781 m (5.84 ft) from NGVD 29 to NAVD 88.)	13,870 ft 4228 m	1,124 ft 343 m	4.29 mi 6.91 km
San Juan Mountains	Needle Mountains	West Needle Mountains	Colorado	Twilight Peak (Note: The summit of Twilight Peak is the highest point of the West Needle Mountains.) (Note: The elevation of Twilight Peak includes an adjustment of +1.537 m (5.04 ft) from NGVD 29 to NAVD 88.)	13,163 ft 4012 m	2,338 ft 713 m	4.88 mi 7.86 km
San Juan Mountains	La Garita Mountains		Colorado	Phoenix Peak (Note: The summit of Phoenix Peak is the highest point of the La Garita Mountains.) (Note: The elevation of Phoenix Peak includes an adjustment of +2 m (6.56 ft) from NGVD 29 to NAVD 88.)	13,902 ft 4237 m	1,495 ft 456 m	3.03 mi 4.87 km
San Juan Mountains	Cochetopa Hills		Colorado	Long Branch Baldy (Note: The summit of Long Branch Baldy is the highest point of the Cochetopa Hills.) (Note: The elevation of Long Branch Baldy includes an adjustment of +1.86 m (6.1 ft) from NGVD 29 to NAVD 88.)	11,982 ft 3652 m	1,454 ft 443 m	13.22 mi 21.3 km
San Juan Mountains	East Central San Juan Mountains		Colorado	Half Peak (Note: The elevation of Half Peak includes an adjustment of +1.998 m (6.56 ft) from NGVD 29 to NAVD 88.)	13,848 ft 4221 m	1,501 ft 458 m	3.89 mi 6.26 km
San Juan Mountains	Southern San Juan Mountains		Colorado	Summit Peak (Note: The summit of Summit Peak is the highest point of the southern San Juan Mountains.) (Note: The elevation of Summit Peak includes an adjustment of +1.877 m (6.16 ft) from NGVD 29 to NAVD 88.)	13,308 ft 4056 m	2,760 ft 841 m	39.9 mi 64.2 km
San Juan Mountains	La Plata Mountains		Colorado	Hesperus Mountain (Note: The summit of Hesperus Mountain is the highest point of the La Plata Mountains.) (Note: The elevation of Hesperus Mountain includes an adjustment of +1.65 m (5.41 ft) from NGVD 29 to NAVD 88.)	13,237 ft 4035 m	2,852 ft 869 m	24.8 mi 39.9 km
San Juan Mountains	Tusas Mountains		New Mexico	Grouse Mesa (Note: The summit of Grouse Mesa is the highest point of the Tusas Mountains.) (Note: The elevation of Grouse Mesa includes an adjustment of +1.627 m (5.34 ft) from NGVD 29 to NAVD 88.)	11,410 ft 3478 m	1,385 ft 422 m	18.91 mi 30.4 km
Mosquito Range			Colorado	Mount Lincoln (Note: The summit of Mount Lincoln is the highest point of the Mosquito Range.) (Note: The elevation of Mount Lincoln includes an adjustment of +2.098 m (6.88 ft) from NGVD 29 to NAVD 88.)	14,293 ft 4357 m	3,862 ft 1177 m	22.6 mi 36.3 km
Mosquito Range	Tenmile Range		Colorado	Quandary Peak (Note: The summit of Quandary Peak is the highest point of the Tenmile Range.) (Note: The elevation of Quandary Peak includes an adjustment of +2.071 m (6.79 ft) from NGVD 29 to NAVD 88.)	14,271 ft 4350 m	1,125 ft 343 m	3.16 mi 5.09 km
Front Range	Central Front Range		Colorado	Grays Peak (Note: The summit of Grays Peak is the highest point of the Front Range and the Continental Divide of North America.) (Note: The elevation of Grays Peak includes an adjustment of +1.881 m (6.17 ft) from NGVD 29 to NAVD 88.)	14,278 ft 4352 m	2,770 ft 844 m	25 mi 40.3 km
Front Range	Central Front Range	Mount Blue Sky Massif	Colorado	Mount Blue Sky (Note: The summit elevation of Mount Blue Sky includes a vertical offset of +1.8 m (5.9 ft) from the station benchmark.) (Note: The elevation of Mount Blue Sky includes an adjustment of +1.827 m (5.99 ft) from NGVD 29 to NAVD 88.)	14,265 ft 4348 m	2,769 ft 844 m	9.79 mi 15.76 km
Front Range	Northern Front Range	Longs Peak Massif	Colorado	Longs Peak (Note: The summit of Longs Peak is the highest point of the northern Front Range.) (Note: The elevation of Longs Peak includes an adjustment of +1.653 m (5.42 ft) from NGVD 29 to NAVD 88.)	14,259 ft 4346 m	2,940 ft 896 m	43.6 mi 70.2 km
Front Range	Northern Front Range	Mummy Range	Colorado	Hagues Peak (Note: The summit of Hagues Peak is the highest point of the Mummy Range.) (Note: The elevation of Hagues Peak includes an adjustment of +1.719 m (5.64 ft) from NGVD 29 to NAVD 88.)	13,573 ft 4137 m	2,420 ft 738 m	15.92 mi 25.6 km
Front Range	Northern Front Range	Indian Peaks	Colorado	North Arapaho Peak (Note: The summit of North Arapaho Peak is the highest point of the Indian Peaks.) (Note: The elevation of North Arapaho Peak includes an adjustment of +1.762 m (5.78 ft) from NGVD 29 to NAVD 88.)	13,508 ft 4117 m	1,665 ft 507 m	15.4 mi 24.8 km
Front Range	Northern Front Range	Never Summer Mountains	Colorado	Mount Richthofen (Note: The summit of Mount Richthofen is the highest point of the Never Summer Mountains.) (Note: The elevation of Mount Richthofen includes an adjustment of +1.658 m (5.44 ft) from NGVD 29 to NAVD 88.)	12,945 ft 3946 m	2,680 ft 817 m	9.66 mi 15.54 km
Front Range	Southern Front Range	Pikes Peak Massif	Colorado	Pikes Peak (Note: Pikes Peak is the easternmost 14,000-foot (4,300 m) summit of Northern America. Pikes Peak was the inspiration for the lyrics of America the Beautiful.) (Note: The elevation of Pikes Peak includes an adjustment of +1.678 m (5.51 ft) from NGVD 29 to NAVD 88.)	14,115 ft 4302 m	5,530 ft 1686 m	60.8 mi 97.8 km
Front Range	Southern Front Range	South Park Hills	Colorado	Waugh Mountain (Note: The summit of Waugh Mountain is the highest point of the South Park Hills.) (Note: The elevation of Waugh Mountain includes an adjustment of +1.702 m (5.58 ft) from NGVD 29 to NAVD 88.)	11,716 ft 3571 m	2,330 ft 710 m	20 mi 32.2 km
Front Range	Southern Front Range	Rampart Range	Colorado	Devils Head (Note: The summit of Devils Head is the highest point of the Rampart Range.) (Note: The elevation of Devils Head includes an adjustment of +1.239 m (4.06 ft) from NGVD 29 to NAVD 88.)	9,749 ft 2972 m	1,248 ft 380 m	7.99 mi 12.86 km
Front Range	Southern Front Range	South Williams Fork Mountains	Colorado	Ptarmigan Peak (Note: The summit of Ptarmigan Peak is the highest point of the South Williams Fork Mountains.) (Note: The elevation of Ptarmigan Peak includes an adjustment of +1.789 m (5.87 ft) from NGVD 29 to NAVD 88.)	12,504 ft 3811 m	721 ft 220 m	4.3 mi 6.92 km
Front Range	Southern Front Range	Tarryall Mountains	Colorado	Bison Peak (Note: The summit of Bison Peak is the highest point of the Tarryall Mountains.) (Note: The elevation of Bison Peak includes an adjustment of +1.624 m (5.33 ft) from NGVD 29 to NAVD 88.)	12,432 ft 3789 m	2,451 ft 747 m	18.34 mi 29.5 km
Front Range	Southern Front Range	Kenosha Mountains	Colorado	Knobby Crest (Note: The summit of Knobby Crest is the highest point of the Kenosha Mountains.) (Note: The elevation of Knobby Crest includes an adjustment of +1.595 m (5.23 ft) from NGVD 29 to NAVD 88.)	12,434 ft 3790 m	1,759 ft 536 m	8.27 mi 13.31 km
Elk Mountains			Colorado	Castle Peak (Note: The summit of Castle Peak is the highest point of the Elk Mountains.) (Note: The elevation of Castle Peak includes an adjustment of +2.165 m (7.1 ft) from NGVD 29 to NAVD 88.)	14,279 ft 4352 m	2,365 ft 721 m	20.9 mi 33.7 km
Elk Mountains	Ruby Range		Colorado	Mount Owen (Note: The summit of Mount Owen is the highest point of the Ruby Range.) (Note: The elevation of Mount Owen includes an adjustment of +1.99 m (6.53 ft) from NGVD 29 to NAVD 88.)	13,070 ft 3984 m	1,358 ft 414 m	7.39 mi 11.9 km
West Elk Mountains			Colorado	West Elk Peak (Note: The summit of West Elk Peak is the highest point of the West Elk Mountains.) (Note: The elevation of West Elk Peak includes an adjustment of +2.105 m (6.91 ft) from NGVD 29 to NAVD 88.)	13,042 ft 3975 m	3,095 ft 943 m	13.78 mi 22.2 km
Gore Range			Colorado	Mount Powell (Note: The summit of Mount Powell is the highest point of the Gore Range.) (Note: The elevation of Mount Powell includes an adjustment of +1.771 m (5.81 ft) from NGVD 29 to NAVD 88.)	13,586 ft 4141 m	3,000 ft 914 m	21.6 mi 34.8 km
Medicine Bow Mountains			Colorado & Wyoming	Clark Peak (Note: The summit of Clark Peak is the highest point of the Medicine Box Mountains.) (Note: The elevation of Clark Peak includes an adjustment of +1.628 m (5.34 ft) from NGVD 29 to NAVD 88.)	12,954 ft 3948 m	2,771 ft 845 m	16.68 mi 26.8 km
Medicine Bow Mountains	Snowy Range		Wyoming	Medicine Bow Peak (Note: The summit of Medicine Bow Peak is the highest point of the Snowy Range.) (Note: The elevation of Medicine Bow Peak includes an adjustment of +1.495 m (4.9 ft) from NGVD 29 to NAVD 88.)	12,016 ft 3662 m	3,243 ft 988 m	40.7 mi 65.5 km
La Sal Mountains			Utah	Mount Peale (Note: The summit of Mount Peale is the highest point of the La Sal Mountains.) (Note: The elevation of Mount Peale includes an adjustment of +1.509 m (4.95 ft) from NGVD 29 to NAVD 88.)	12,726 ft 3879 m	6,181 ft 1884 m	73.2 mi 117.8 km
Flat Tops (Colorado)			Colorado	Flat Top Mountain (Note: The summit of Flat Top Mountain is the highest point of the Flat Tops.) (Note: The elevation of Flat Top Mountain includes an adjustment of +1.698 m (5.57 ft) from NGVD 29 to NAVD 88.)	12,361 ft 3768 m	4,054 ft 1236 m	42.8 mi 68.9 km
Rabbit Ears Range			Colorado	Parkview Mountain (Note: The summit of Parkview Mountain is the highest point of the Rabbit Ears Range.) (Note: The elevation of Parkview Mountain includes an adjustment of +1.589 m (5.21 ft) from NGVD 29 to NAVD 88.)	12,301 ft 3749 m	2,676 ft 816 m	10.91 mi 17.56 km
Park Range	Central Park Range		Colorado	Mount Zirkel (Note: The summit of Mount Zirkel is the highest point of the Park Range.) (Note: The elevation of Mount Zirkel includes an adjustment of +1.632 m (5.35 ft) from NGVD 29 to NAVD 88.)	12,185 ft 3714 m	3,470 ft 1058 m	38.1 mi 61.3 km
Park Range	Elkhead Mountains		Colorado	Sand Mountain North (Note: The summit of Sand Mountain North is the highest point of the Elkhead Mountains.) (Note: The elevation of Sand Mountain North includes an adjustment of +1.512 m (4.96 ft) from NGVD 29 to NAVD 88.)	10,884 ft 3317 m	2,182 ft 665 m	11.29 mi 18.17 km
White River Plateau			Colorado	Blair Mountain (Note: The summit of Blair Mountain is the highest point of the White River Plateau.) (Note: The elevation of Blair Mountain includes an adjustment of +1.565 m (5.13 ft) from NGVD 29 to NAVD 88.)	11,465 ft 3495 m	1,736 ft 529 m	17.52 mi 28.2 km
Grand Mesa			Colorado	Crater Peak (Note: The summit of Crater Peak is the highest point of Grand Mesa.) (Note: The elevation of Crater Peak includes an adjustment of +1.75 m (5.74 ft) from NGVD 29 to NAVD 88.)	11,333 ft 3454 m	2,307 ft 703 m	17.99 mi 29 km
Laramie Mountains			Colorado & Wyoming	South Bald Mountain (Note: The summit of South Bald Mountain is the highest point of the Laramie Mountains.) (Note: The elevation of South Bald Mountain includes an adjustment of +1.425 m (4.68 ft) from NGVD 29 to NAVD 88.)	11,007 ft 3355 m	1,863 ft 568 m	13.66 mi 22 km
Uncompahgre Plateau			Colorado & Utah	Horsefly Peak (Note: The summit of Horsefly Peak is the highest point of the Uncompahgre Plateau.) (Note: The elevation of Horsefly Peak includes an adjustment of +1.581 m (5.19 ft) from NGVD 29 to NAVD 88.)	10,353 ft 3156 m	1,437 ft 438 m	13.27 mi 21.4 km
Ute Mountain			Colorado	Ute Peak (Note: The summit of Ute Peak is the highest point of Ute Mountain.) (Note: The elevation of Ute Peak includes an adjustment of +1.139 m (3.74 ft) from NGVD 29 to NAVD 88.)	9,984 ft 3043 m	4,039 ft 1231 m	39.1 mi 62.9 km
Raton Mesa			Colorado & New Mexico	Fishers Peak (Note: The summit of Fishers Peak is the highest point of Raton Mesa and the High Plains of the United States. Fishers Peak is the easternmost summit of its elevation in the United States.) (Note: The elevation of Fishers Peak includes an adjustment of +1.145 m (3.76 ft) from NGVD 29 to NAVD 88.)	9,633 ft 2936 m	1,847 ft 563 m	32.4 mi 52.2 km

== Mountain peaks ==
=== Highest summits ===
The following sortable table lists the 57 mountain peaks of the Southern Rocky Mountains with at least 4,000 meters (13,123.4 ft) of topographic elevation and at least 500 meters (1,640.4 ft) of topographic prominence.

The 57 mountain peaks of the Southern Rocky Mountains with at least 4000 meters of topographic elevation and 500 meters of topographic prominence
Rank	Mountain Peak	State	Mountain Range	Elevation	Prominence	Isolation
1	Mount Elbert	Colorado	Sawatch Range	14,440 ft 4401 m	9,093 ft 2772 m	671 mi 1,079 km
2	Mount Massive	Colorado	Sawatch Range	14,424 ft 4396.3 m	1,978 ft 603 m	5.1 mi 8.21 km
3	Mount Harvard	Colorado	Collegiate Peaks	14,421 ft 4396 m	2,327 ft 709 m	14.92 mi 24 km
4	Blanca Peak	Colorado	Sierra Blanca	14,357 ft 4376 m	5,326 ft 1623 m	103.4 mi 166.4 km
5	La Plata Peak	Colorado	Collegiate Peaks	14,343 ft 4372 m	1,841 ft 561 m	6.28 mi 10.1 km
6	Uncompahgre Peak	Colorado	San Juan Mountains	14,321 ft 4365 m	4,277 ft 1304 m	85.1 mi 136.9 km
7	Crestone Peak	Colorado	Crestones	14,300 ft 4359 m	4,554 ft 1388 m	27.4 mi 44.1 km
8	Mount Lincoln	Colorado	Mosquito Range	14,293 ft 4357 m	3,862 ft 1177 m	22.6 mi 36.3 km
9	Castle Peak	Colorado	Elk Mountains	14,279 ft 4352 m	2,365 ft 721 m	20.9 mi 33.7 km
10	Grays Peak	Colorado	Front Range	14,278 ft 4352 m	2,770 ft 844 m	25 mi 40.3 km
11	Mount Antero	Colorado	Sawatch Range	14,276 ft 4351 m	2,503 ft 763 m	17.75 mi 28.6 km
12	Mount Blue Sky	Colorado	Front Range	14,271 ft 4350 m	2,769 ft 844 m	9.79 mi 15.76 km
13	Longs Peak	Colorado	Front Range	14,259 ft 4346 m	2,940 ft 896 m	43.6 mi 70.2 km
14	Mount Wilson	Colorado	San Miguel Mountains PB	14,252 ft 4344 m	4,024 ft 1227 m	33.1 mi 53.2 km
15	Mount Princeton NGS	Colorado	Collegiate Peaks	14,204 ft 4329 m	2,177 ft 664 m	5.19 mi 8.36 km
16	Mount Yale NGS	Colorado	Collegiate Peaks	14,202 ft 4329 m	1,876 ft 572 m	5.55 mi 8.93 km
17	Maroon Peak NGS	Colorado	Elk Mountains	14,163 ft 4317 m	2,336 ft 712 m	8.06 mi 12.97 km
18	Mount Sneffels	Colorado	Sneffels Range PB	14,158 ft 4315 m	3,050 ft 930 m	15.73 mi 25.3 km
19	Capitol Peak	Colorado	Elk Mountains	14,137 ft 4309 m	1,730 ft 527 m	7.44 mi 11.98 km
20	Pikes Peak	Colorado	Pikes Peak Massif	14,115 ft 4302 m	5,530 ft 1686 m	60.8 mi 97.8 km
21	Mount Eolus	Colorado	Needle Mountains	14,089 ft 4294 m	2,183 ft 665 m	15.63 mi 25.2 km
22	Handies Peak NGS	Colorado	San Juan Mountains	14,058 ft 4285 m	1,888 ft 575 m	11.18 mi 18 km
23	Culebra Peak	Colorado	Culebra Range	14,053 ft 4283 m	4,827 ft 1471 m	35.5 mi 57.1 km
24	San Luis Peak (Note: The elevation of San Luis Peak includes an adjustment of +2.098 m (6.88 ft) from NGVD 29 to NAVD 88.)	Colorado	San Juan Mountains	14,022 ft 4274 m	3,113 ft 949 m	27 mi 43.4 km
25	Mount of the Holy Cross	Colorado	Sawatch Range	14,011 ft 4271 m	2,111 ft 643 m	18.52 mi 29.8 km
26	Grizzly Peak NGS	Colorado	Collegiate Peaks	13,995 ft 4266 m	1,908 ft 582 m	6.77 mi 10.89 km
27	Mount Ouray	Colorado	Sawatch Range	13,961 ft 4255 m	2,659 ft 810 m	13.58 mi 21.9 km
28	Vermilion Peak PB	Colorado	San Juan Mountains	13,900 ft 4237 m	2,105 ft 642 m	9.07 mi 14.6 km
29	Mount Silverheels NGS PB	Colorado	Front Range	13,829 ft 4215 m	2,283 ft 696 m	5.48 mi 8.82 km
30	Rio Grande Pyramid NGS PB	Colorado	San Juan Mountains	13,827 ft 4214 m	1,861 ft 567 m	10.76 mi 17.31 km
31	Bald Mountain PB	Colorado	Front Range	13,690 ft 4173 m	2,099 ft 640 m	7.51 mi 12.09 km
32	Mount Oso	Colorado	San Juan Mountains	13,690 ft 4173 m	1,664 ft 507 m	5.47 mi 8.81 km
33	Mount Jackson PB	Colorado	Sawatch Range	13,676 ft 4169 m	1,810 ft 552 m	3.21 mi 5.16 km
34	Bard Peak PB	Colorado	Front Range	13,647 ft 4159 m	1,701 ft 518 m	5.43 mi 8.74 km
35	Peak 10 PB	Colorado	Tenmile Range	13,640 ft 4157 m	1,759 ft 536 m	0.87 mi 1.4 km
36	West Spanish Peak	Colorado	Spanish Peaks	13,631 ft 4155 m	3,686 ft 1123 m	20.4 mi 32.9 km
37	Mount Powell	Colorado	Gore Range	13,586 ft 4141 m	3,000 ft 914 m	21.6 mi 34.8 km
38	Hagues Peak	Colorado	Mummy Range	13,573 ft 4137 m	2,420 ft 738 m	15.92 mi 25.6 km
39	Tower Mountain PB	Colorado	San Juan Mountains	13,558 ft 4132 m	1,652 ft 504 m	5.36 mi 8.62 km
40	Treasure Mountain PB	Colorado	Elk Mountains	13,535 ft 4125 m	2,821 ft 860 m	6.92 mi 11.13 km
41	North Arapaho Peak	Colorado	Indian Peaks PB	13,508 ft 4117 m	1,665 ft 507 m	15.4 mi 24.8 km
42	Parry Peak	Colorado	Front Range	13,397 ft 4083 m	1,731 ft 528 m	9.46 mi 15.22 km
43	Bill Williams Peak	Colorado	Williams Mountains PB	13,389 ft 4081 m	1,682 ft 513 m	3.73 mi 6 km
44	Sultan Mountain PB	Colorado	San Juan Mountains	13,373 ft 4076 m	1,868 ft 569 m	4.59 mi 7.39 km
45	West Buffalo Peak PB	Colorado	Mosquito Range	13,332 ft 4064 m	1,986 ft 605 m	10.18 mi 16.38 km
46	Mount Herard PB	Colorado	Sangre de Cristo Range	13,325 ft 4062 m	2,040 ft 622 m	4.64 mi 7.47 km
47	Summit Peak	Colorado	San Juan Mountains	13,308 ft 4056 m	2,760 ft 841 m	39.9 mi 64.2 km
48	Dolores Peak PB	Colorado	San Miguel Mountains PB	13,296 ft 4053 m	1,950 ft 594 m	4.98 mi 8.02 km
49	Antora Peak PB	Colorado	Sawatch Range	13,275 ft 4046 m	2,409 ft 734 m	6.75 mi 10.86 km
50	Henry Mountain PB	Colorado	Sawatch Range	13,261 ft 4042 m	1,674 ft 510 m	11.53 mi 18.55 km
51	Lavender Peak PB	Colorado	La Plata Mountains	13,245 ft 4037 m	2,860 ft 872 m	24.8 mi 39.9 km
52	Jacque Peak PB	Colorado	Gore Range	13,211 ft 4027 m	2,065 ft 629 m	4.52 mi 7.28 km
53	Bennett Peak PB	Colorado	San Juan Mountains	13,209 ft 4026 m	1,743 ft 531 m	17.1 mi 27.5 km
54	Conejos Peak NGS PB	Colorado	San Juan Mountains	13,179 ft 4017 m	1,912 ft 583 m	8.15 mi 13.12 km
55	Wheeler Peak	New Mexico	Taos Mountains	13,167 ft 4013 m	3,409 ft 1039 m	37.4 mi 60.1 km
56	Twilight Peak	Colorado	West Needle Mountains PB	13,163 ft 4012 m	2,338 ft 713 m	4.88 mi 7.86 km
57	South River Peak PB	Colorado	San Juan Mountains	13,154 ft 4009 m	2,448 ft 746 m	22 mi 35.3 km

=== Most prominent summits ===
The following sortable table lists the three ultra prominent summits of the Southern Rocky Mountains (with at least 1,500 meters (4,921.3 ft) of topographic prominence.)

The three ultra-prominent mountain peaks of the Southern Rocky Mountains
Rank	Mountain Peak	State	Mountain Range	Elevation	Prominence	Isolation
1	Mount Elbert	Colorado	Sawatch Range	14,440 ft 4401 m	9,093 ft 2772 m	671 mi 1,079 km
2	Pikes Peak	Colorado	Pikes Peak Massif	14,115 ft 4302 m	5,530 ft 1686 m	60.8 mi 97.8 km
3	Blanca Peak	Colorado	Sierra Blanca Massif	14,357 ft 4376 m	5,326 ft 1623 m	103.4 mi 166.4 km

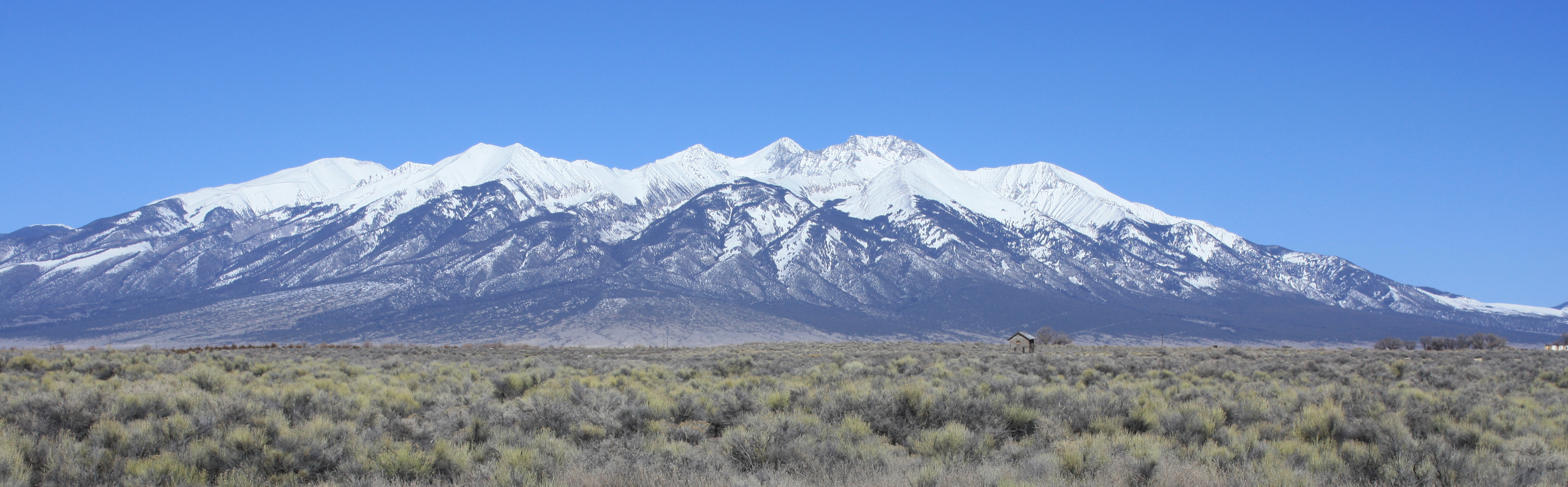
Blanca Peak on the Sierra Blanca Massif in south-central Colorado

=== Most isolated summits ===
The following sortable table lists the 15 most topographically isolated peaks of the Southern Rocky Mountains with a topographic isolation of at least 50 kilometers (31.07 mi) and a topographic prominence of at least 500 meters (1,640.4 ft).

The 15 mountain peaks of the Southern Rocky Mountains with at least 50 kilometers of topographic isolation and 500 meters of topographic prominence
Rank	Mountain Peak	State	Mountain Range	Elevation	Prominence	Isolation
1	Mount Elbert	Colorado	Sawatch Range	14,440 ft 4401 m	9,093 ft 2772 m	671 mi 1,079 km
2	Blanca Peak	Colorado	Sierra Blanca Massif	14,357 ft 4376 m	5,326 ft 1623 m	103.4 mi 166.4 km
3	Uncompahgre Peak	Colorado	San Juan Mountains	14,321 ft 4365 m	4,277 ft 1304 m	85.1 mi 136.9 km
4	Mount Peale	Utah	La Sal Mountains	12,726 ft 3879 m	6,181 ft 1884 m	73.2 mi 117.8 km
5	Pikes Peak	Colorado	Pikes Peak Massif	14,115 ft 4302 m	5,530 ft 1686 m	60.8 mi 97.8 km
6	Longs Peak	Colorado	Front Range	14,259 ft 4346 m	2,940 ft 896 m	43.6 mi 70.2 km
7	Flat Top Mountain	Colorado	Flat Tops PB	12,361 ft 3768 m	4,054 ft 1236 m	42.8 mi 68.9 km
8	Truchas Peak	New Mexico	Santa Fe Mountains PB	13,108 ft 3995 m	4,001 ft 1220 m	42.4 mi 68.2 km
9	Mount Zirkel	Colorado	Park Range	12,185 ft 3714 m	3,470 ft 1058 m	38.1 mi 61.3 km
10	Medicine Bow Peak	Wyoming	Snowy Range PB	12,016 ft 3662 m	3,243 ft 988 m	40.7 mi 65.5 km
11	Summit Peak	Colorado	San Juan Mountains	13,308 ft 4056 m	2,760 ft 841 m	39.9 mi 64.2 km
12	Wheeler Peak	New Mexico	Taos Mountains	13,167 ft 4013 m	3,409 ft 1039 m	37.4 mi 60.1 km
13	Culebra Peak	Colorado	Culebra Range	14,053 ft 4283 m	4,827 ft 1471 m	35.5 mi 57.1 km
14	Mount Wilson	Colorado	San Miguel Mountains PB	14,252 ft 4344 m	4,024 ft 1227 m	33.1 mi 53.2 km
15	Fishers Peak	Colorado	Raton Mesa PB	9,633 ft 2936 m	1,847 ft 563 m	32.4 mi 52.2 km

=== Easternmost summits ===
The following sortable table lists progressively the easternmost Rocky Mountain summits of their respective elevation.

The easternmost high summits of the Rocky Mountains
Rank	Mountain Peak	State	Mountain Range	Elevation	Prominence	Isolation	Location
1	Fishers Peak	Colorado	Raton Mesa	9,633 ft 2936 m	1,847 ft 563 m	32.4 mi 52.2 km	37.0982°N; 104.4628°W
2	East Spanish Peak (Note: East Spanish Peak the easternmost 3,800 meters (12,500 feet) summit of Northern America.) (Note: The elevation of East Spanish Peak includes an adjustment of +1.372 m (4.5 ft) from NGVD 29 to NAVD 88.)	Colorado	Spanish Peaks	12,688 ft 3867 m	2,383 ft 726 m	4.21 mi 6.78 km	37.3934°N; 104.9201°W
3	West Spanish Peak	Colorado	Spanish Peaks	13,631 ft 4155 m	3,686 ft 1123 m	20.4 mi 32.9 km	37.3756°N; 104.9934°W
4	Pikes Peak	Colorado	Front Range	14,115 ft 4302 m	5,530 ft 1686 m	60.8 mi 97.8 km	38.8405°N; 105.0442°W
5	Blanca Peak	Colorado	Sangre de Cristo Mountains	14,357 ft 4376 m	5,326 ft 1623 m	103.4 mi 166.4 km	37.5775°N; 105.4856°W
6	Mount Harvard	Colorado	Sawatch Range	14,421 ft 4396 m	2,327 ft 709 m	14.92 mi 24 km	38.9244°N; 106.3207°W
7	Mount Elbert	Colorado	Sawatch Range	14,440 ft 4401 m	9,093 ft 2772 m	671 mi 1,079 km	39.1178°N; 106.4454°W

== Mountain passes ==
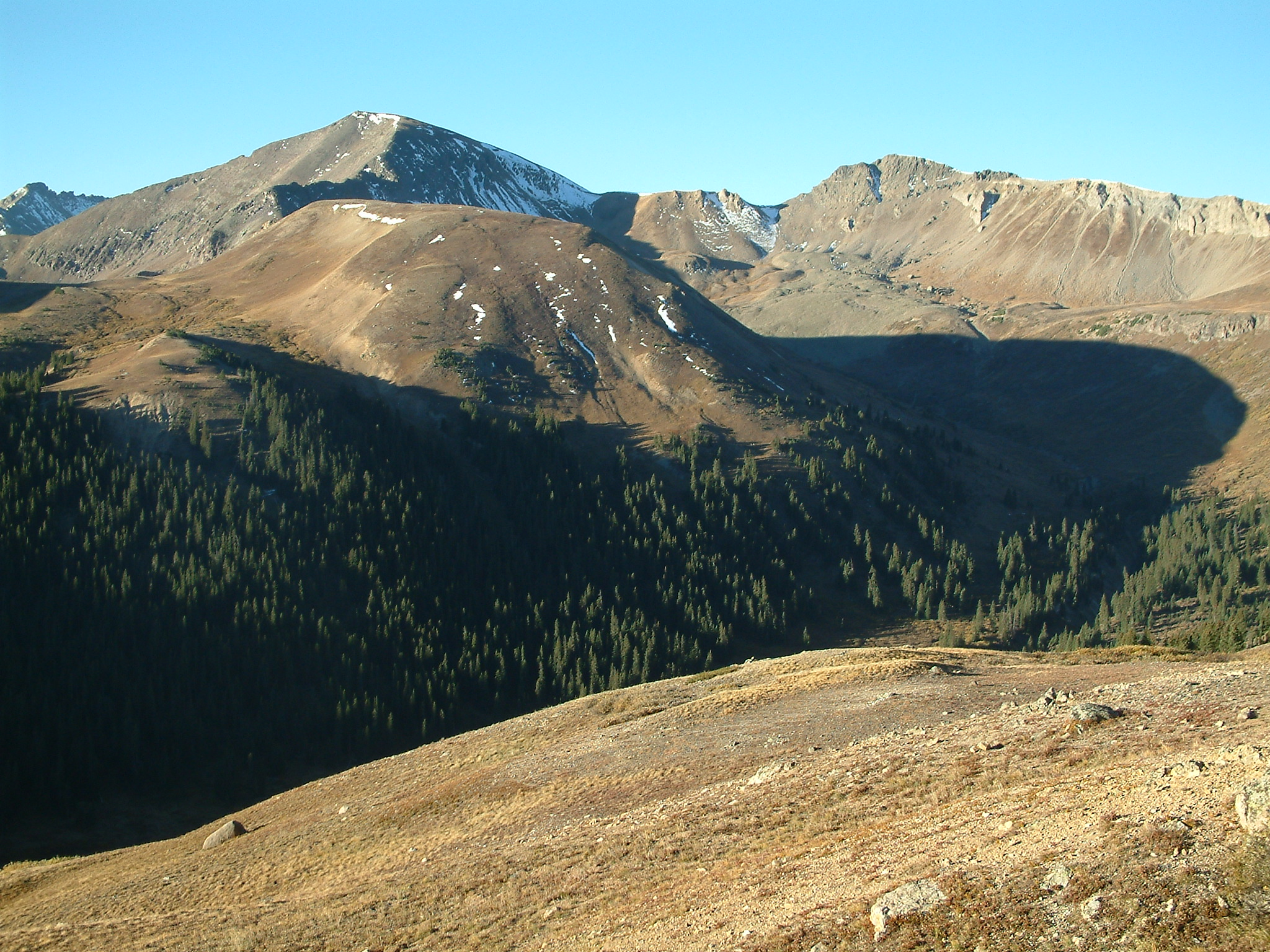
View from Independence Pass in Colorado.

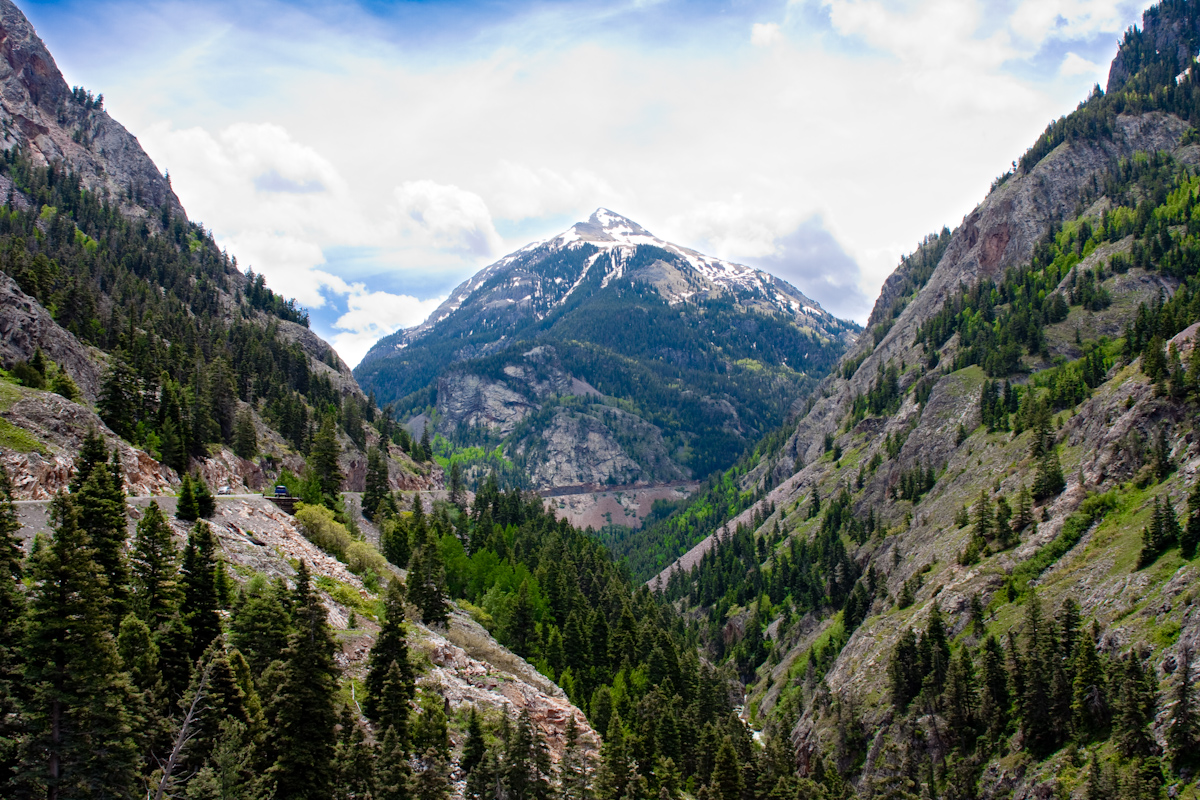
View from Red Mountain Pass in Colorado.

The following sortable table lists the paved mountain passes and highway summits of the Southern Rocky Mountains.

Paved mountain passes and highway summits of the Southern Rocky Mountains
Rank	Mountain Pass	State	Elevation	Route
1	Mount Blue Sky Scenic Byway	Colorado	14,160 feet 4316 m	Colorado State Highway 5
2	Pikes Peak Highway	Colorado	14,115 feet 4302 m	Pikes Peak Highway
3	Trail Ridge Road	Colorado	12,183 feet 3713 m	U.S. Route 34
4	Cottonwood Pass	Colorado	12,119 feet 3694 m	CR 209/ CR 306
5	Independence Pass	Colorado	12,095 feet 3687 m	Colorado State Highway 82
6	Loveland Pass	Colorado	11,992 feet 3655 m	U.S. Route 6
7	Hoosier Pass	Colorado	11,541 feet 3518 m	Colorado State Highway 9
8	Slumgullion Pass	Colorado	11,361 feet 3463 m	Colorado State Highway 149
9	Fremont Pass	Colorado	11,318 feet 3450 m	Colorado State Highway 91
10	Berthoud Pass	Colorado	11,315 feet 3449 m	U.S. Route 40
11	Monarch Pass	Colorado	11,312 feet 3448 m	U.S. Route 50
12	Eisenhower Tunnel	Colorado	11,158 feet 3401 m	Interstate 70
13	Warrior Mountain Summit	Colorado	11,140 feet 3395 m	Colorado State Highway 103
14	Juniper Pass	Colorado	11,040 feet 3365 m	Colorado State Highway 103
15	Red Mountain Pass	Colorado	11,018 feet 3358 m	U.S. Route 550
16	Molas Divide	Colorado	10,910 feet 3325 m	U.S. Route 550
17	Spring Creek Pass	Colorado	10,901 feet 3323 m	Colorado State Highway 149
18	Wolf Creek Pass	Colorado	10,850 feet 3307 m	U.S. Route 160
19	Snowy Range Pass	Wyoming	10,847 feet 3306 m	Wyoming Highway 130
20	Grand Mesa Summit	Colorado	10,839 feet 3304 m	Colorado State Highway 65
21	Milner Pass	Colorado	10,758 feet 3279 m	U.S. Route 34
22	Vail Pass	Colorado	10,666 feet 3251 m	Interstate 70
23	Coal Bank Pass	Colorado	10,640 feet 3243 m	U.S. Route 550
24	Tennessee Pass	Colorado	10,424 feet 3177 m	U.S. Route 24
25	Cameron Pass	Colorado	10,276 feet 3132 m	Colorado State Highway 14
26	La Manga Pass	Colorado	10,230 feet 3118 m	Colorado State Highway 17
27	Lizard Head Pass	Colorado	10,222 feet 3116 m	Colorado State Highway 145
28	North Pass	Colorado	10,149 feet 3093 m	Colorado State Highway 114
29	Cumbres Pass	Colorado	10,022 feet 3055 m	Colorado State Highway 17
30	Kenosha Pass	Colorado	10,001 feet 3048 m	U.S. Route 285
31	Red Hill Pass	Colorado	9,993 feet 3046 m	U.S. Route 285
32	Cucharas Pass	Colorado	9,941 feet 3030 m	Colorado State Highway 12
33	Battle Pass	Wyoming	9,915 feet 3022 m	Wyoming Highway 70
34	Bobcat Pass	New Mexico	9,833 feet 2997 m	New Mexico State Road 38
35	Willow Creek Pass	Colorado	9,621 feet 2932 m	Colorado State Highway 125
36	Gore Pass	Colorado	9,527 feet 2904 m	Colorado State Highway 134
37	Wilkerson Pass	Colorado	9,507 feet 2898 m	U.S. Route 24
38	Currant Creek Pass	Colorado	9,482 feet 2890 m	Colorado State Highway 9
39	Rabbit Ears Pass	Colorado	9,426 feet 2873 m	U.S. Route 40
40	North La Veta Pass	Colorado	9,413 feet 2869 m	U.S. Route 160
41	Trout Creek Pass	Colorado	9,346 feet 2849 m	U.S. Route 24 U.S. Route 285
42	Battle Mountain Summit	Colorado	9,267 feet 2825 m	U.S. Route 24
43	Ute Pass	Colorado	9,165 feet 2793 m	U.S. Route 24
44	Wind River Pass	Colorado	9,148 feet 2788 m	Colorado State Highway 7
45	Black Mesa Summit	Colorado	9,121 feet 2780 m	Colorado State Highway 92
46	Palo Flechado Pass	New Mexico	9,109 feet 2776 m	U.S. Route 64
47	Hardscrabble Pass	Colorado	9,085 feet 2769 m	Colorado State Highway 96
48	Poncha Pass	Colorado	9,010 feet 2746 m	U.S. Route 285
49	Dallas Divide	Colorado	8,970 feet 2734 m	Colorado State Highway 62
50	Muddy Pass	Colorado	8,772 feet 2674 m	U.S. Route 40
51	McClure Pass	Colorado	8,755 feet 2669 m	Colorado State Highway 133
52	Blue Mesa Summit	Colorado	8,704 feet 2653 m	U.S. Route 50
53	Wondervu Hill	Colorado	8,660 feet 2640 m	Colorado State Highway 72
54	Happy Jack Summit	Wyoming	8,640 feet 2633 m	Interstate 80
55	U.S. Hill	New Mexico	8,562 feet 2610 m	New Mexico State Road 518
56	Douglas Pass	Colorado	8,268 feet 2520 m	Colorado State Highway 139
57	Cerro Summit	Colorado	7,950 feet 2423 m	U.S. Route 50
58	Raton Pass	New Mexico	7,834 feet 2388 m	Interstate 25
59	Yellowjacket Pass	Colorado	7,783 feet 2372 m	U.S. Route 160
60	Glorieta Pass	New Mexico	7,557 feet 2303 m	Interstate 25
61	South Pass	Wyoming	7,550 feet 2301 m	Wyoming Highway 28
62	Monument Hill	Colorado	7,343 feet 2238 m	Interstate 25
63	Morton Pass	Wyoming	7,173 feet 2186 m	Wyoming Highway 34
64	Unaweep Divide	Colorado	7,048 feet 2148 m	Colorado State Highway 141
65	Separation Summit	Wyoming	7,005 feet 2135 m	Interstate 80
66	Robinson Summit	Wyoming	6,927 feet 2111 m	Interstate 80

== See also ==
- Lists of mountains
- Mountain peaks of the Rocky Mountains
- Front Range
