= South Arapaho Peak =

Mountain in the state of Colorado

Coordinates: 40°01′10″N 105°38′59″W

South Arapaho Peak is in the Indian Peaks Wilderness in the northern Front Range of the Rocky Mountains of North America. The 13,397-foot (4,083 m) thirteener is located west-southwest of the Town of Ward, Colorado, United States, just east of the Continental Divide separating Roosevelt National Forest and Boulder County from Arapaho National Forest and Grand County.

Between South Arapaho Peak and neighboring North Arapaho Peak sits Arapaho Glacier, which is owned by the City of Boulder as part of its water supply. North and South Arapahoe Peaks are connected by a 0.8 mile, Class 4 connecting ridge. West of these peaks is Arapaho Pass.

== Climate ==
Climate data for South Arapaho Peak 40.0254 N, 105.6506 W, Elevation: 12,943 ft (3,945 m) (1991–2020 normals)
Month	Jan	Feb	Mar	Apr	May	Jun	Jul	Aug	Sep	Oct	Nov	Dec	Year
Mean daily maximum °F (°C)	19.9 (−6.7)	19.1 (−7.2)	25.5 (−3.6)	30.4 (−0.9)	39.0 (3.9)	50.5 (10.3)	56.6 (13.7)	54.8 (12.7)	48.1 (8.9)	36.2 (2.3)	26.7 (−2.9)	20.2 (−6.6)	35.6 (2.0)
Daily mean °F (°C)	10.2 (−12.1)	9.4 (−12.6)	15.1 (−9.4)	20.0 (−6.7)	28.7 (−1.8)	39.6 (4.2)	46.2 (7.9)	44.4 (6.9)	37.8 (3.2)	26.7 (−2.9)	17.5 (−8.1)	10.7 (−11.8)	25.5 (−3.6)
Mean daily minimum °F (°C)	0.6 (−17.4)	−0.2 (−17.9)	4.8 (−15.1)	9.6 (−12.4)	18.5 (−7.5)	28.7 (−1.8)	35.7 (2.1)	34.1 (1.2)	27.4 (−2.6)	17.2 (−8.2)	8.2 (−13.2)	1.3 (−17.1)	15.5 (−9.2)
Average precipitation inches (mm)	5.12 (130)	5.54 (141)	4.88 (124)	5.53 (140)	4.34 (110)	2.24 (57)	3.12 (79)	2.90 (74)	3.04 (77)	3.27 (83)	4.45 (113)	4.80 (122)	49.23 (1,250)
Source: PRISM Climate Group

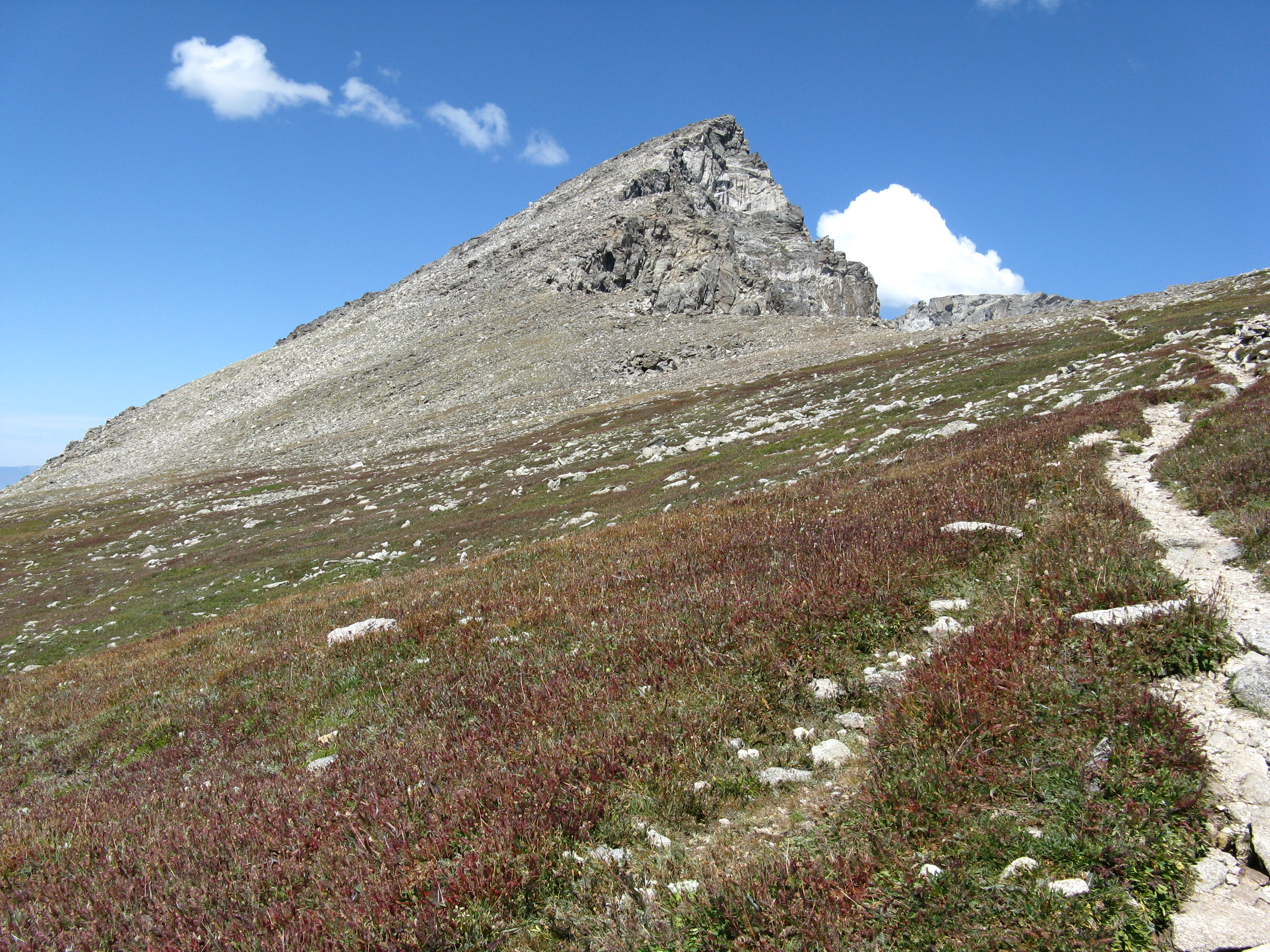
South Arapaho Peak

== See also ==
- North Arapaho Peak
- Arapaho Pass (Front Range)
