= Junius Henderson =

American scientist

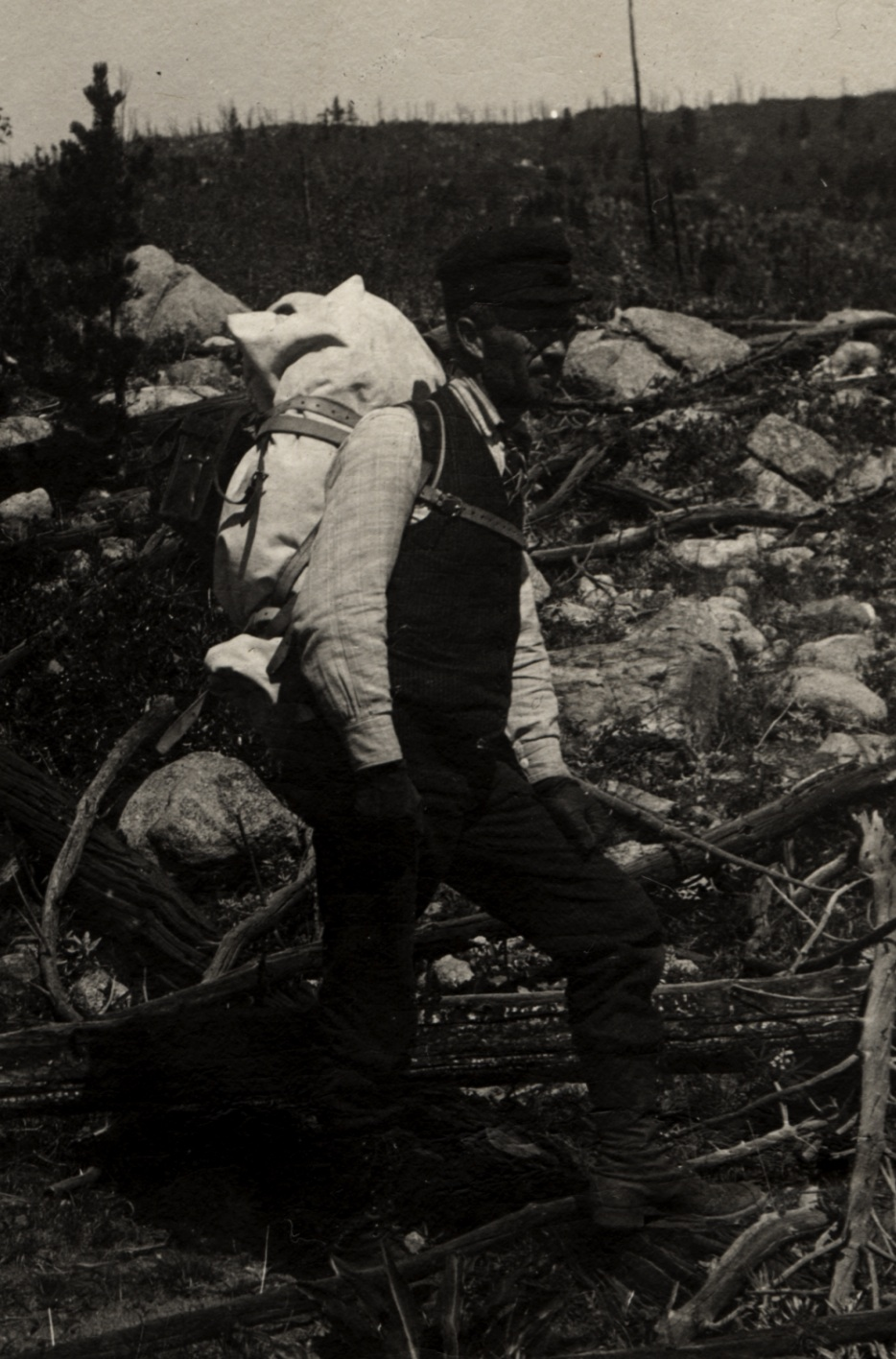
- Junius Henderson in 1904
- Born: April 1865; Marshalltown, Iowa
- Died: November 4, 1937 (aged 72)
- Occupations: lawyer, judge, curator, amateur malacologist
- Known for: First curator of the University of Colorado Museum of Natural History

Junius Henderson (April 1865 – November 4, 1937) was an American lawyer, judge, curator, and amateur malacologist who was the first Curator (a position eventually equivalent to Director) of the University of Colorado Museum of Natural History, of which he is considered to be the founder. He has been described as “a giant of natural history in early-day Colorado” who “cast an enormous intellectual umbra.”

== Early life and education ==
Born in Marshalltown, Iowa, on April 30, 1865, Henderson was a ninth-generation American. He was of Scottish descent and was the son of a district court judge. By age 22, he was working as the editor of a small Washington newspaper.

In 1892, he relocated with his parents to Boulder, Colorado, where he gained employment in a law office. Within two years, he attained his qualifications as a lawyer. By 1902, he had ascended to the roles of county judge and law instructor at the University of Colorado.

He had always been avidly interested in nature, so when he discovered that the university's natural history collection was small and poorly maintained, with no official curator, he volunteered to take care of it.

== Career ==
He was appointed the honorary curator of the Museum (without pay) in 1902, when "the whole collection would have gone into a good sized wagon, and was of no value." The collection at that time consisted of “a few fossils and mollusk shells, a small collection of rocks and minerals, and several mounted bird and mammals.”

“During his early years as judge and curator,” according to one source, “Henderson found time to earn a bachelor's degree from the university. Instead of attending graduation, he went exploring for fossils.”

Working closely with Professors Theodore Dru Alison Cockerell and Francis Ramaley, he expanded the collection. “His skill in developing the museum collection earned him considerable recognition,” writes one source. In 1909, the Museum was declared a separate University department with a $500 annual budget, and Henderson was granted a salary and a full professorship. He resigned his position as judge and devoted himself full-time to the museum and to the collection of specimens for its collection.

Over a 26-year period, he kept field notebooks containing handwritten daily accounts of his expeditions in the Rocky Mountains. His notebooks have been described as “paint[ing] a vivid picture of a changing Colorado, as horses-and-buggies give way to cars, cities grow, and wild landscapes retreat. Although their primary value is to biologists and geologists, his notes will also be of value to historians, geographers, and anthropologists interested in this period of Colorado’s history.” Those field notes, transcribed in 2001 by Professor Peter Robinson of the University of Colorado at Boulder, are available online.

Henderson was one of the first to study and publish on the extinct (1905) and existing (1910) glaciers of Colorado. Henderson was especially interested in documenting the Arapaho glacier, of which he took many photographs from 1902 to 1922.[6] Photographs taken by him of glaciers can also be viewed online.[7] Henderson was one of the first to explore the Arapaho glacier, of which he took many photographs from 1902 to 1922.

“In the early 20th century,” according to one source, “the biology program of the University of Colorado, led by Dr. Junius Henderson and Dr. Gordon Alexander, made significant contributions to early lists of birds.” He specialized, however, in mollusks, discovering 28 living and 33 fossil molluscan species. His complete checklist of freshwater and terrestrial mollusks of Idaho, published in 1924 (a supplement was issued in 1936), was not superseded until the year 2000.

The Albuquerque Journal noted in 2008 that Henderson, visiting New Mexico in 1912 with Wilfred William Robbins, “puzzled over what they called New Mexico's 'great desiccation.'” While the state, they observed, had “insufficient moisture to support a large population,” archaeological evidence showed that large cities had once thrived there.

Henderson remained Curator of the Museum until his retirement in 1933, when he was succeeded by Hugo G. Rodeck. In retirement, Henderson continued to pursue research. He died on November 4, 1937.

A 2003 article in the Fort Collins Coloradoan, headlined “Henderson helped shape understanding of state,” celebrated Henderson's contributions to Colorado's heritage. “Read the early literature on Colorado birds,” wrote Kevin J. Cook, “and the name 'Junius Henderson' pops up again and again. Read about mammals in Colorado, or about reptiles and amphibians, or mollusks, especially mollusks, and Henderson appears. Read about Colorado itself, its geology and geography, or especially its glaciers, and Henderson figures prominently.”

During Henderson's tenure, the Museum was located in the Hale Building. The current museum building, which opened in 1937, is now known as the Henderson Building.

== Honors and awards ==
Henderson was elected a member of the Malacological Society of London in 1913.

== Personal life ==
Henderson was married to his first wife, Nellie, for 30 years. She died in 1924. He married his second wife, Bess, a zoologist and teacher, in 1929.

== Selected publications ==
Henderson wrote books entitled The Practical Uses of Birds and Economic Mammalogy. His other writings include:

- Henderson, J. 1905 Extinct Glaciers of Colorado. University of Colorado studies; v. 3, no. 1:39-44
- Henderson, J. 1907. The Mollusca of Colorado. Part I. University of Colorado Studies, Boulder, Colorado 4(2):77-96 + 2 plates.
- Henderson, J. 1910. Extinct and existing glaciers of Colorado. General series; v. 8, no. 1. University of Colorado Studies, Boulder, Colorado
- Henderson, J. 1912. The Mollusca of Colorado. Part III. University of Colorado Studies, Boulder, Colorado 9(2-3):53-63.
- Henderson, J. and M.M. Ellis, 1913. The Amphibia and Reptilia of Colorado.
- Henderson, J. and L. E. Daniels. 1916. Hunting Mollusca in Utah and Idaho. Academy of Natural Sciences of Philadelphia, Proceedings 68:315-339.
- Henderson, J. 1918. A mollusk hunt in Wyoming. Nautilus 32(2):40-47.
- Henderson, J. 1919. Some further comments upon the work of Lorenzo Eugene Daniels. Nautilus 32(4):137-138.
- Henderson, J. 1924. Mollusca of Colorado, Utah, Montana, Idaho and Wyoming. University of Colorado Studies, Boulder, Colorado 13(2):65-223.
- Henderson, J. 1927. Some South Dakota Mollusca. Nautilus 41(1):19-20.
- Henderson, J. 1928. Margaritifera vs. Margaritana. Nautilus 41(3):91.
- Henderson, J. 1929. Some fossil fresh-water Mollusca from Washington and Oregon. Nautilus 42(4):119-123.
- Henderson, J. 1929. Non-marine Mollusca of Oregon and Washington. University of Colorado Studies, Boulder, Colorado 17(2):47-190.
- Henderson, J. 1931. Variation in Carinifex newberryi (Lea) and Lymnaea utahensis (Call). Nautilus 44(3):77-79.
- Henderson, J. 1931. The problem of the Mollusca of Bear Lake and Utah Lake, Idaho-Utah. Nautilus 44(4):109-113.
- Henderson, J. 1931. Molluscan provinces in the western United States. University of Colorado Studies, Boulder, Colorado 18(4):177-186.
- Henderson, J. 1934. Some new Mesozoic Mollusca from the Rocky Mountain region and Arizona. Journal of Paleontology 8:259-263, pl. 36.
- Henderson, J 1935. Fossil non-marine Mollusca of North America. Geological Society of America. Special Paper 3:1-313. In the abstract to this book-length paper, Henderson writes that “in the Rocky Mountain States and the adjacent territory and extending far northward into British America, the non-marine formations are so extensive, of such thickness, and so associated with thick coal beds and other deposits of economic importance, that they are of great consequence to the geologist” but “present more complex and difficult problems than marine deposits generally do, which results in much disagreement as to the age and correlation of some of the formations.” The book seeks to provide a “comprehensive, systematic review and index” of the literature on this subject and “to clear up many problems in synonymy, geologic and geographic distribution of species, and so on.”
- Henderson, J. 1935. Margaritifera and Fluminicola in Wyoming. Nautilus 48(3):107.
- Henderson, J. 1936. Mollusca of Colorado, Utah, Montana, Idaho and Wyoming. Supplement. University of Colorado Studies, Boulder, Colorado 23(2):81-145.
- Henderson, J. 1936. The non-marine Mollusca of Oregon and Washington. Supplement. University of Colorado Studies, Boulder, Colorado 23(4):251-280.
- Henderson, J. 1939. The mollusca of New Mexico and Arizona. pp. 187–194 in D.D. Brand and F.E. Harvey (eds.). So live the works of men. University of New Mexico Press. Albuquerque, New Mexico. 366 pp.
- Henderson, J., and H.G. Rodek. 1934. New species of Pliocene Mollusca from Eastern Oregon. Journal of Paleontology 8(3):264-269.
