= Colorado Rockies (disambiguation) =

The Colorado Rockies are a professional baseball team based in Denver, Colorado, U.S.

Colorado Rockies may also refer to:

- The portion of the Rocky Mountains located within the U.S. State of Colorado
  - More generally, the Southern Rocky Mountains
- Colorado Rockies (NHL), former National Hockey League team (1976–1982)
