= Medicine Bow =

Medicine Bow may refer to:

- Medicine Bow, Wyoming, a town in southeastern Wyoming
- Medicine Bow Mountains, a mountain range in Colorado and Wyoming
- Medicine Bow Peak, the highest peak of the Medicine Bow Mountains
- Medicine Bow National Forest, a U.S. National forest in Wyoming
- Camp Medicine Bow, Yawgoog Scout Reservation, Rhode Island
- Medicine Bow, an alias of American musician Kali Malone
