= North Arapaho Peak =

Mountain in Colorado, United States

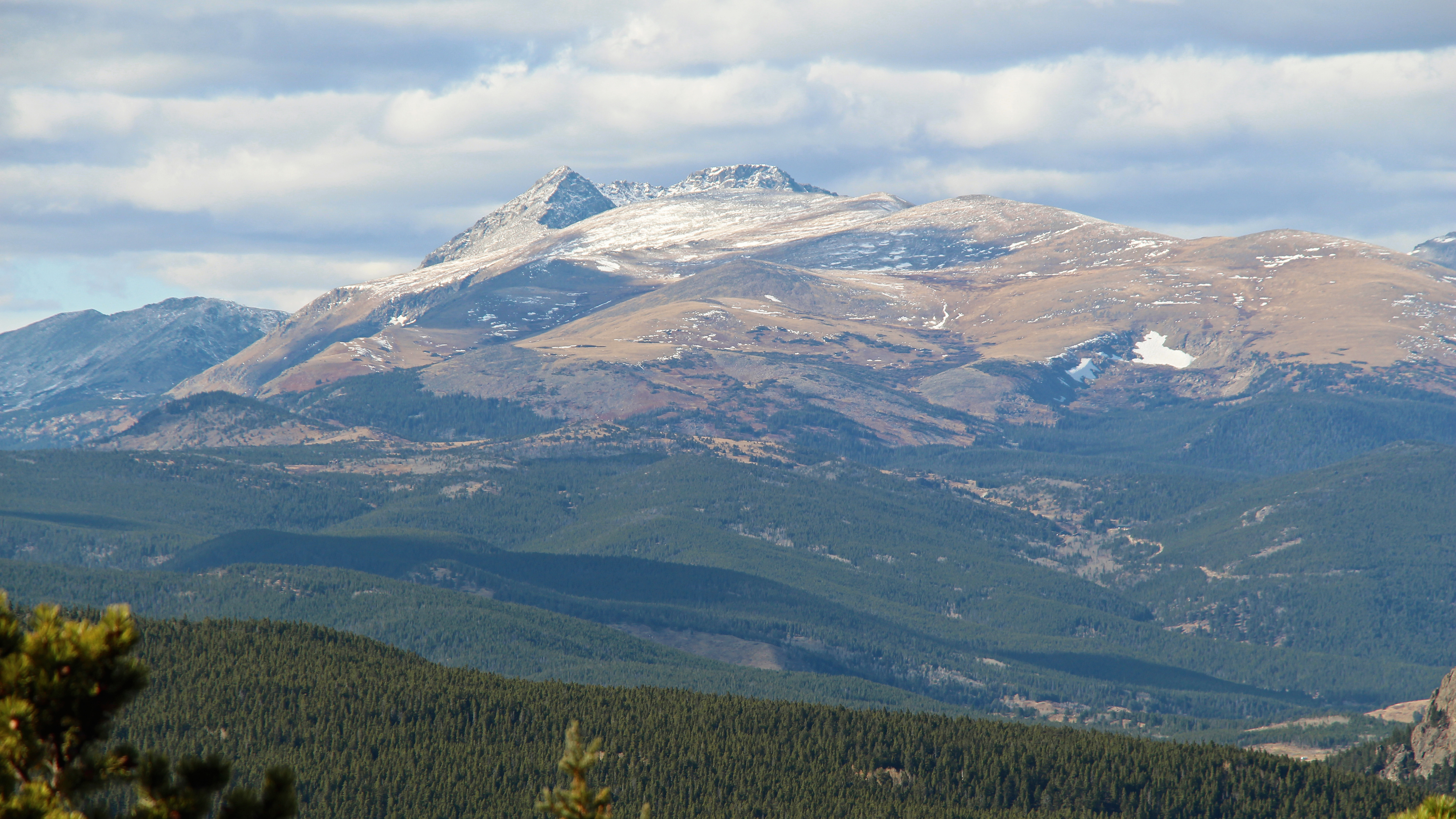
- North Arapaho Peak from Panorama Point

Highest point
- Elevation: 13,508 ft (4,117 m)
- Prominence: 1,665 ft (507 m)
- Isolation: 15.38 mi (24.75 km)
- Listing: North America highest peaks 94th; US highest major peaks 77th; Colorado highest major peaks 40th
- Coordinates: 40°01′35″N 105°39′01″W

Geography
- Location within Colorado
- Location: Continental Divide between Boulder and Grand counties, Colorado, United States
- Parent range: Front Range, Highest summit of the Indian Peaks
- Topo map(s): USGS 7.5' topographic map Monarch Lake, Colorado

North Arapaho Peak is the highest summit of the Indian Peaks in the northern Front Range of the Rocky Mountains of North America. The 13,508-foot (4,117 m) thirteener is located in the Indian Peaks Wilderness, 7.8 miles (12.6 km) west-southwest (bearing 245°) of the Town of Ward, Colorado, United States, on the Continental Divide separating Roosevelt National Forest and Boulder County from Arapaho National Forest and Grand County.

Between North Arapaho Peak and neighboring South Arapaho Peak sits Arapaho Glacier, which is owned by the City of Boulder as part of its water supply. North and South Arapahoe Peaks are connected by a 0.8-mile (1.3 km), Class 4 connecting ridge. West of these peaks is Arapaho Pass.

== Climate ==
According to the Köppen climate classification system, the mountain is located in an alpine subarctic climate zone with cold, snowy winters, and cool to warm summers. Due to its altitude, it receives precipitation all year, as snow in winter and as thunderstorms in summer, with a dry period in late spring. Climbers can expect afternoon rain, hail, and lightning from the seasonal monsoon in late July and August. This climate supports the Arapaho Glacier on the peak's east slope.

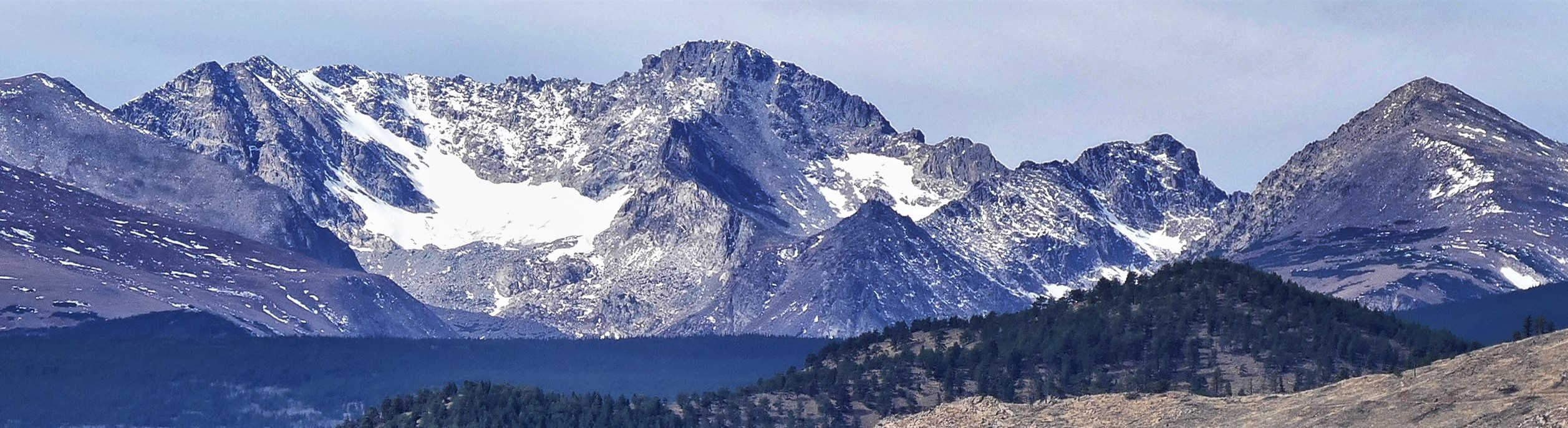
East aspect of North Arapaho Peak with Arapaho Glacier showing. ( Mount Albion to the right)

== Historical names ==
- Arapaho Peak
- North Arapaho Peak

== See also ==
- List of mountain peaks of North America
  - List of mountain peaks of the United States
    - List of mountain peaks of Colorado
