= Elk Mountain (Grand County, Colorado) =

Mountain in Colorado, United States

- Location within Colorado

Highest point
- Elevation: 11,424 ft (3,482 m)
- Prominence: 2,159 ft (658 m)
- Isolation: 10.52 mi (16.93 km)
- Listing: Colorado prominent summits
- Coordinates: 40°09′43″N 106°07′42″W

Geography
- Location: Grand County, Colorado, U.S.
- Parent range: Rabbit Ears Range
- Topo map(s): USGS 7.5' topographic map Corral Peaks, Colorado

Climbing
- Easiest route: hike, scramble

Elk Mountain is a prominent mountain summit in the Rabbit Ears Range of the Rocky Mountains of North America. The 11,424-foot (3,482 m) peak is located in Arapaho National Forest, 12.9 miles (20.8 km) northwest by west (bearing 301°) of the Town of Granby in Grand County, Colorado, United States.

== See also ==
- List of Colorado mountain ranges
- List of Colorado mountain summits
  - List of Colorado fourteeners
  - List of Colorado 4000 meter prominent summits
  - List of the most prominent summits of Colorado
- List of Colorado county high points
