= Radial Mountain =

Mountain in Colorado, United States

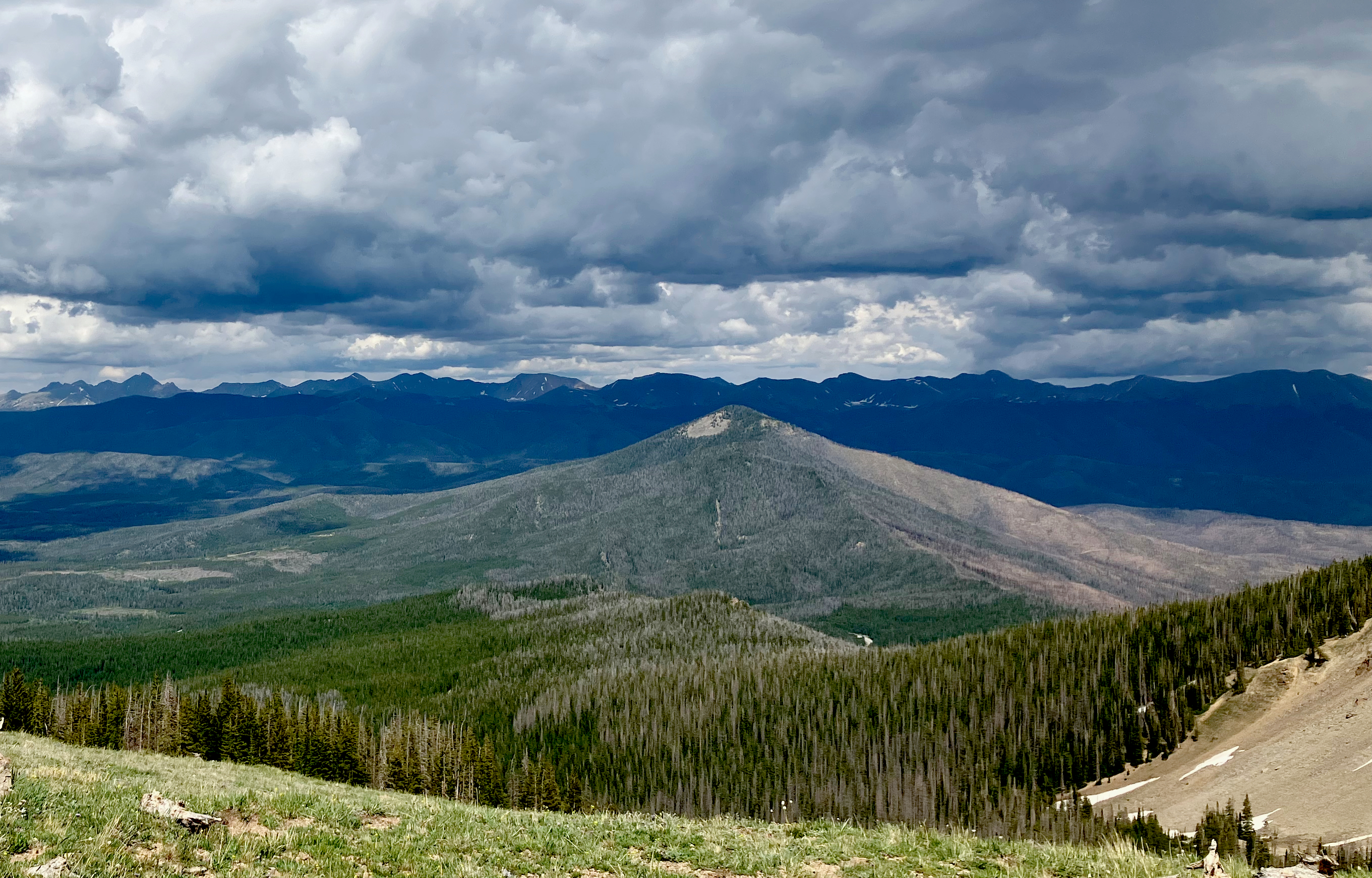
- Viewed from Parkview Mountain, June 2024.

Highest point
- Elevation: 11,247 ft (3,428 m)
- Prominence: 1,401 ft (427 m)
- Isolation: 3.8 mi (6.1 km)
- Coordinates: 40°21′34.39″N 106°3′7.19″W

Geography
- Location within Colorado
- Country: United States
- State: Colorado
- Counties: Grand and Jackson
- Parent range: Rabbit Ears Range
- Topo map: USGS Radial Mountain

Radial Mountain, elevation 11,247 ft (3,428 m), is a mountain in Grand and Jackson counties in northern Colorado. The mountain lies in the Rabbit Ears Range, east of Parkview Mountain and Willow Creek Pass. It straddles the Continental Divide, and the Continental Divide National Scenic Trail passes along the south side of the peak.

== Geology ==
Several magmatic dikes radiate out from the mountain, and some are visible from Colorado State Highway 125, which goes over Willow Creek Pass just west of Radial Mountain.

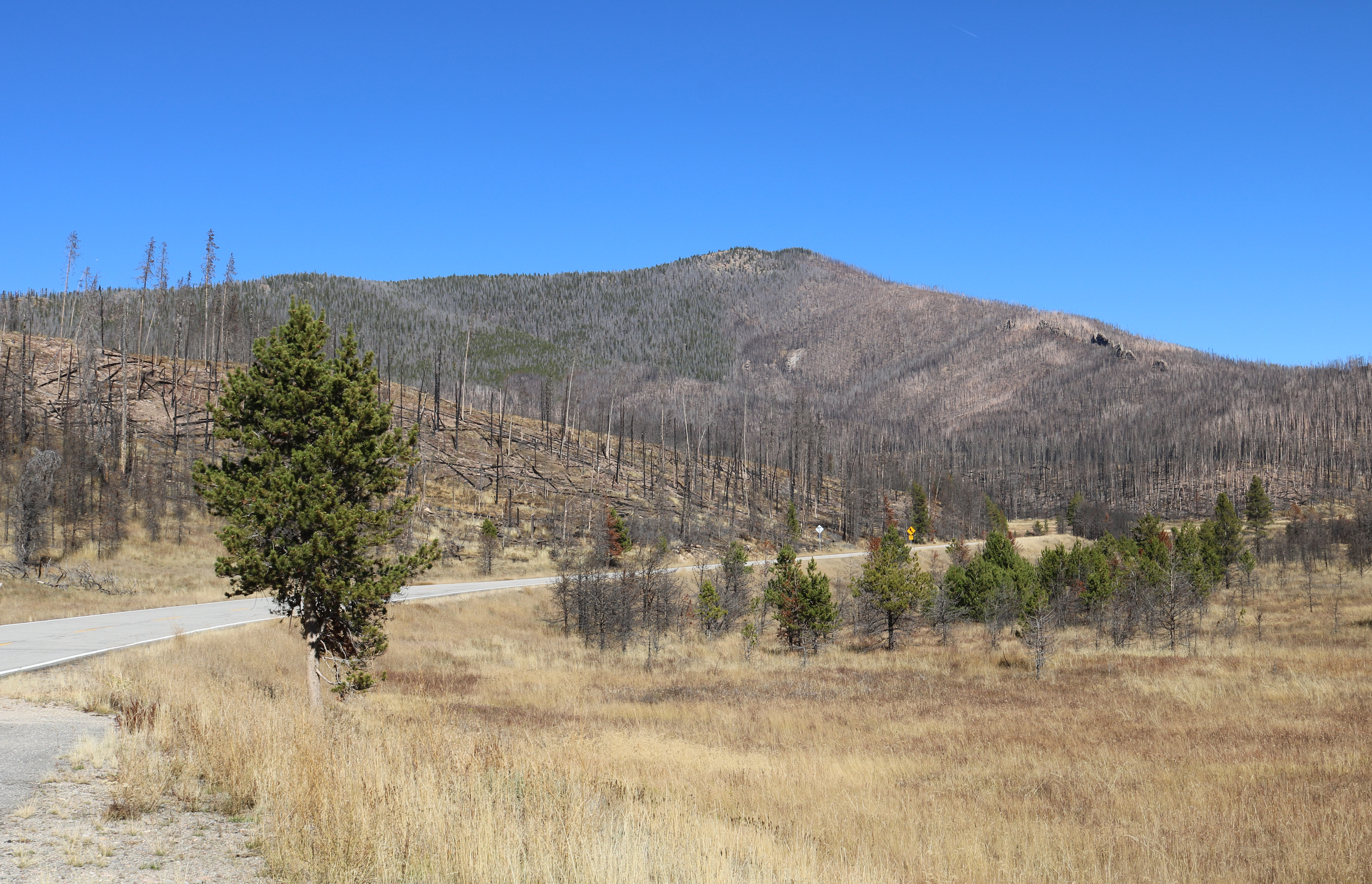
The mountain in October 2022, with magmatic dike visible on the ridge.

== Hiking ==
Radial Mountain is among the most accessible to hike in the Rabbit Ears Range. It's close to Willow Creek Pass, where the Continental Divide Trail passes the highway. The trail doesn't go to the peak's summit, but it brings hikers partly there, then from that point, one can hike through the trees to the summit.
