= Canadian River (disambiguation) =

The Canadian River is the largest tributary of the Arkansas River in the United States.

Canadian River may also refer to:

- Canadian River (Colorado), a tributary of the North Platte River in Jackson County, Colorado
- North Canadian River, a tributary of the Canadian River in Oklahoma

== See also ==
- List of rivers of Canada
