= Parkview Mountain =

Mountain in Colorado, United States

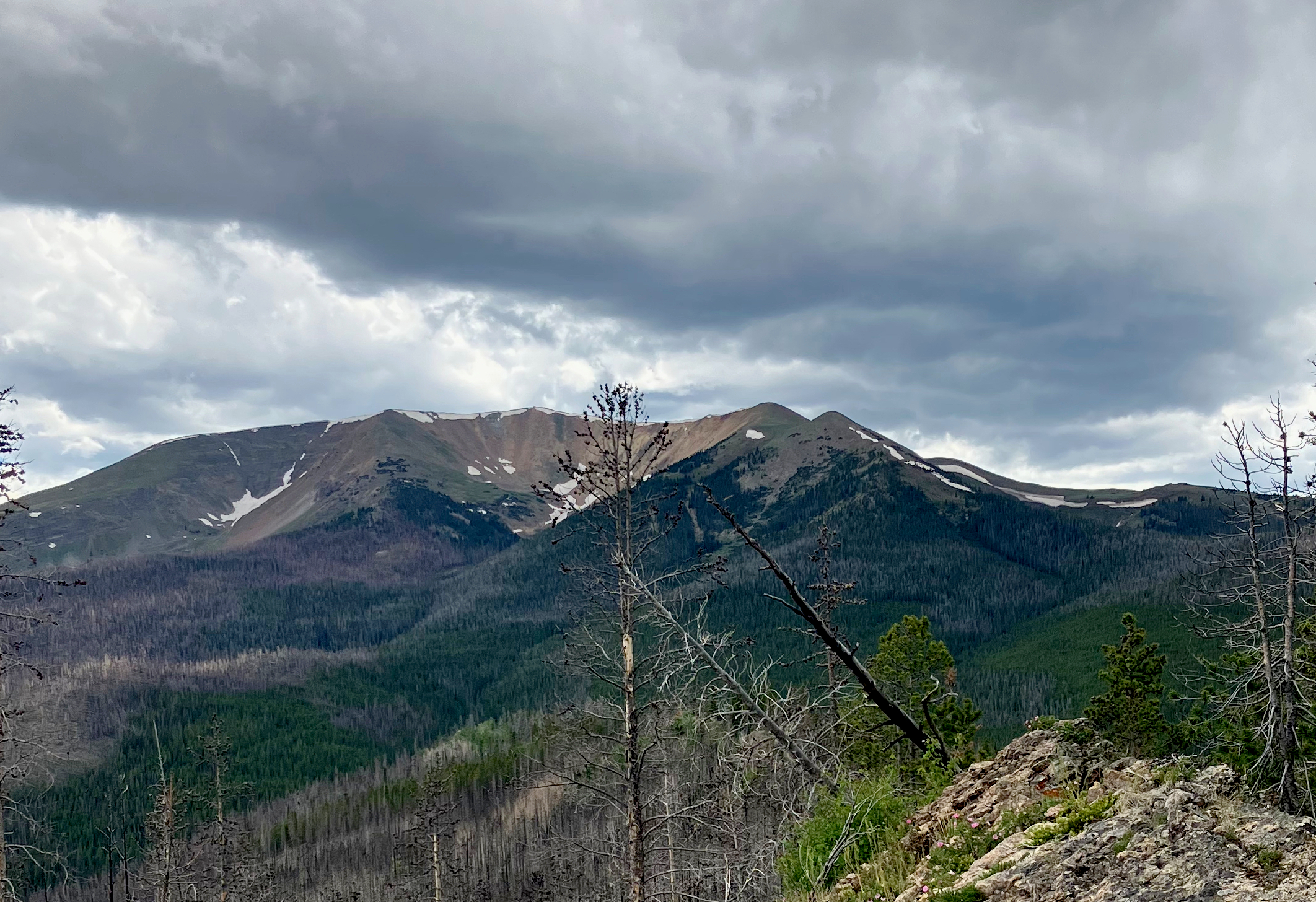
- The mountain, viewed from neighboring Radial Mountain (June 2024).

Highest point
- Elevation: 12,301 ft (3,749 m)
- Prominence: 2,676 ft (816 m)
- Isolation: 10.91 mi (17.56 km)
- Listing: Colorado prominent summits Colorado range high points
- Coordinates: 40°19′49″N 106°08′11″W

Geography
- Location within Colorado
- Location: Grand and Jackson counties, Colorado, U.S.
- Parent range: Highest summit of the Rabbit Ears Range
- Topo map(s): USGS 7.5' topographic map Parkview Mountain, Colorado

Climbing
- Easiest route: hike

Parkview Mountain is the highest summit of the Rabbit Ears Range in the Rocky Mountains of North America. The mountain is on the Continental Divide in Routt National Forest about 3 miles (4.8 km) southwest of Willow Creek Pass.

From the summit a climber can see both Middle Park to the south and North Park to the North, hence the name of the Peak.

The southern slopes of the mountain were impacted by the 2020 East Troublesome Fire.

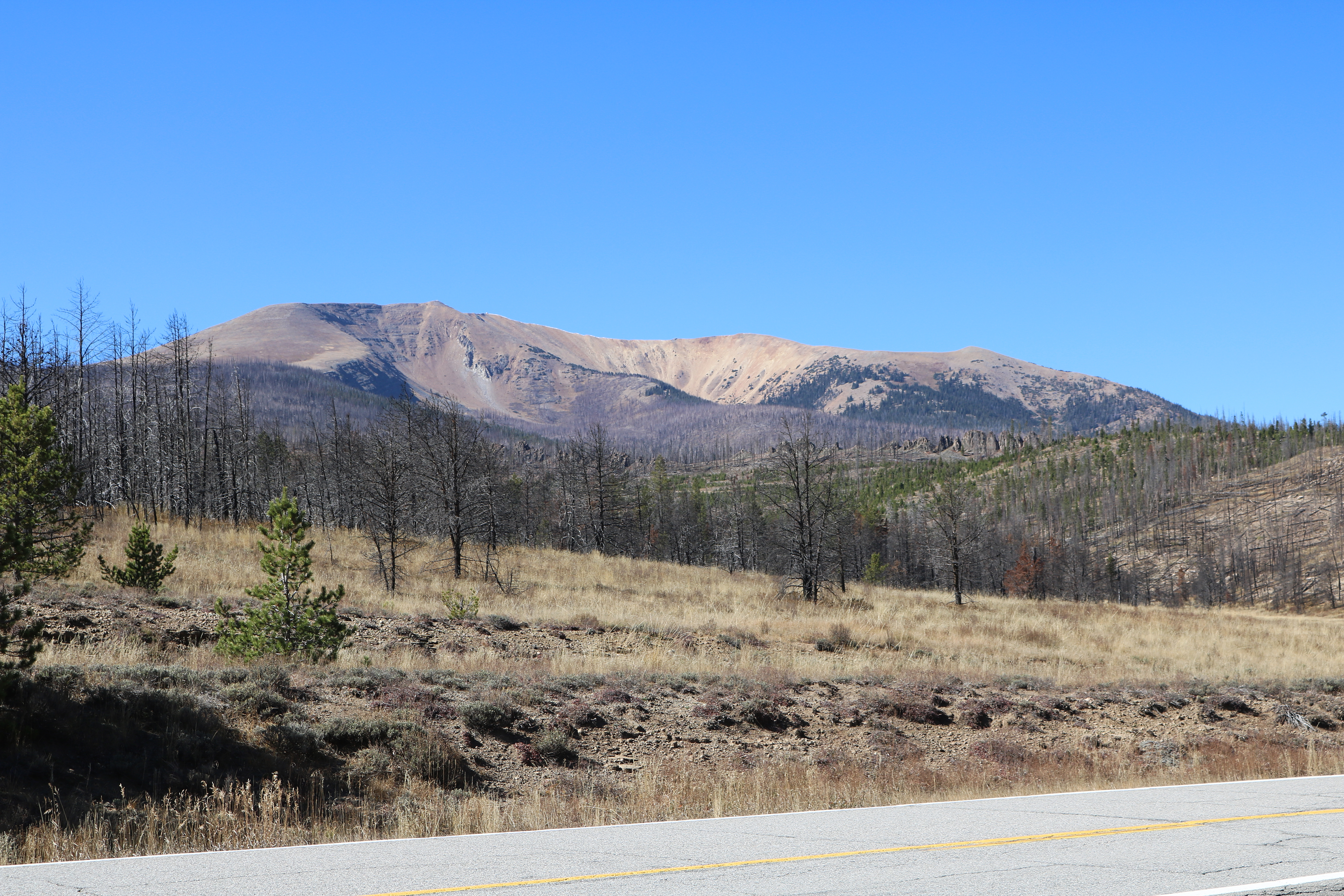
Parkview Mountain viewed from Colorado Highway 125 (October 2022). Fire damage from the East Troublesome Fire is visible.

== See also ==
- List of Colorado mountain ranges
- List of Colorado mountain summits
  - List of Colorado fourteeners
  - List of Colorado 4000 meter prominent summits
  - List of the most prominent summits of Colorado
- List of Colorado county high points
