= Fishers Peak =

Mountain in Colorado, United States

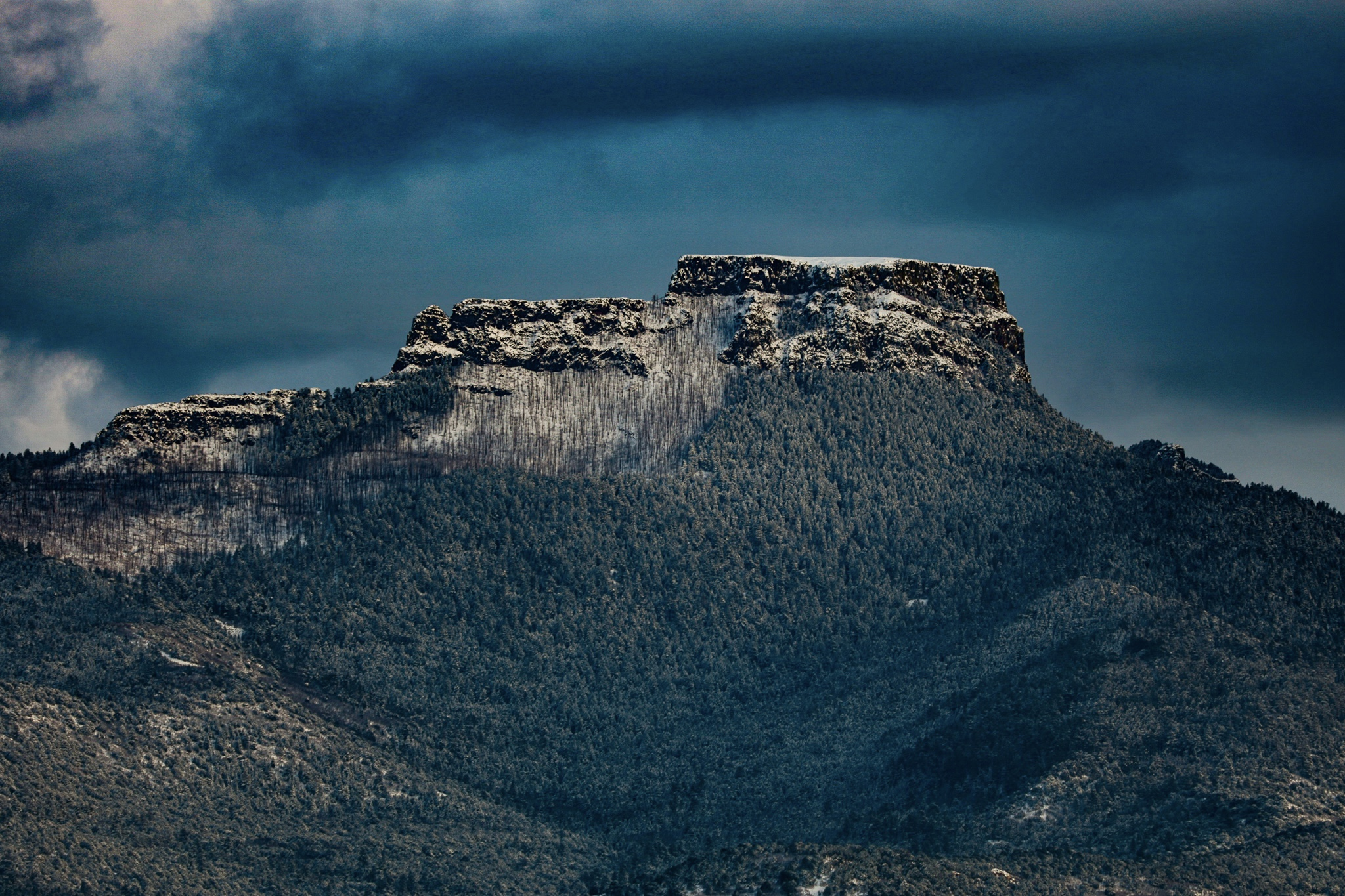
- View of Fishers Peak from Trinidad, Colorado

Highest point
- Elevation: 9,633 ft (2,936 m)
- Prominence: 1,847 ft (563 m)
- Isolation: 30.98 mi (49.86 km)
- Listing: Colorado prominent summits Colorado range high points
- Coordinates: 37°05′54″N 104°27′46″W

Geography
- Location within Colorado
- Location: Las Animas County, Colorado, United States
- Parent range: Highest summit of Raton Mesas
- Topo map(s): USGS 7.5' topographic map Fishers Peak, Colorado

Climbing
- Easiest route: hike

Fishers Peak is a spur of the Ratón Mesa, which reaches the highest elevation of the collective mesas of the Ratón formation commencing at the Sangre de Cristo Mountains, a subset of the Rocky Mountains, from the west, 90 miles eastward to the Oklahoma border. Ratón Mesas include Black Mesa, Johnson Mesa, and Mesa de Maya. The prominent 9,633-foot (2,936 m) mesa is located 5.5 miles (8.8 km) south by east (bearing 163°) of the Town of Trinidad in Las Animas County, Colorado, United States. Fishers Peak is higher than any point in the United States east of its longitude.

== Fishers Peak State Park ==
In 2020, Colorado Parks and Wildlife established Fishers Peak State Park. The park occupies the 19,200-acre (7,800 ha) parcel surrounding and including the peak that was formerly a privately held ranch. It opened in late October 2020.

=== Contiguous conservation areas ===
Adjoining Fishers Peak State Park on the east on the mesa below Fishers Peak are two Colorado State Wildlife Areas (SWA): Lake Dorothey, 5,152 acres (2,085 ha), and James M. John, 8,339 acres (3,375 ha). Lake Dorothey also adjoins Sugarite Canyon State Park, 3,600 acres (1,500 ha), in New Mexico. The total contiguous acreage in public ownership is thus about 36,000 acres (15,000 ha).

== See also ==
- List of Colorado mountain ranges
- List of Colorado mountain summits
  - List of Colorado fourteeners
  - List of Colorado 4000 meter prominent summits
  - List of the most prominent summits of Colorado
- List of Colorado county high points
