= Raton Mesa =

Collective name of mesas in New Mexico and Colorado

Coordinates: 37°02′N 104°24′W

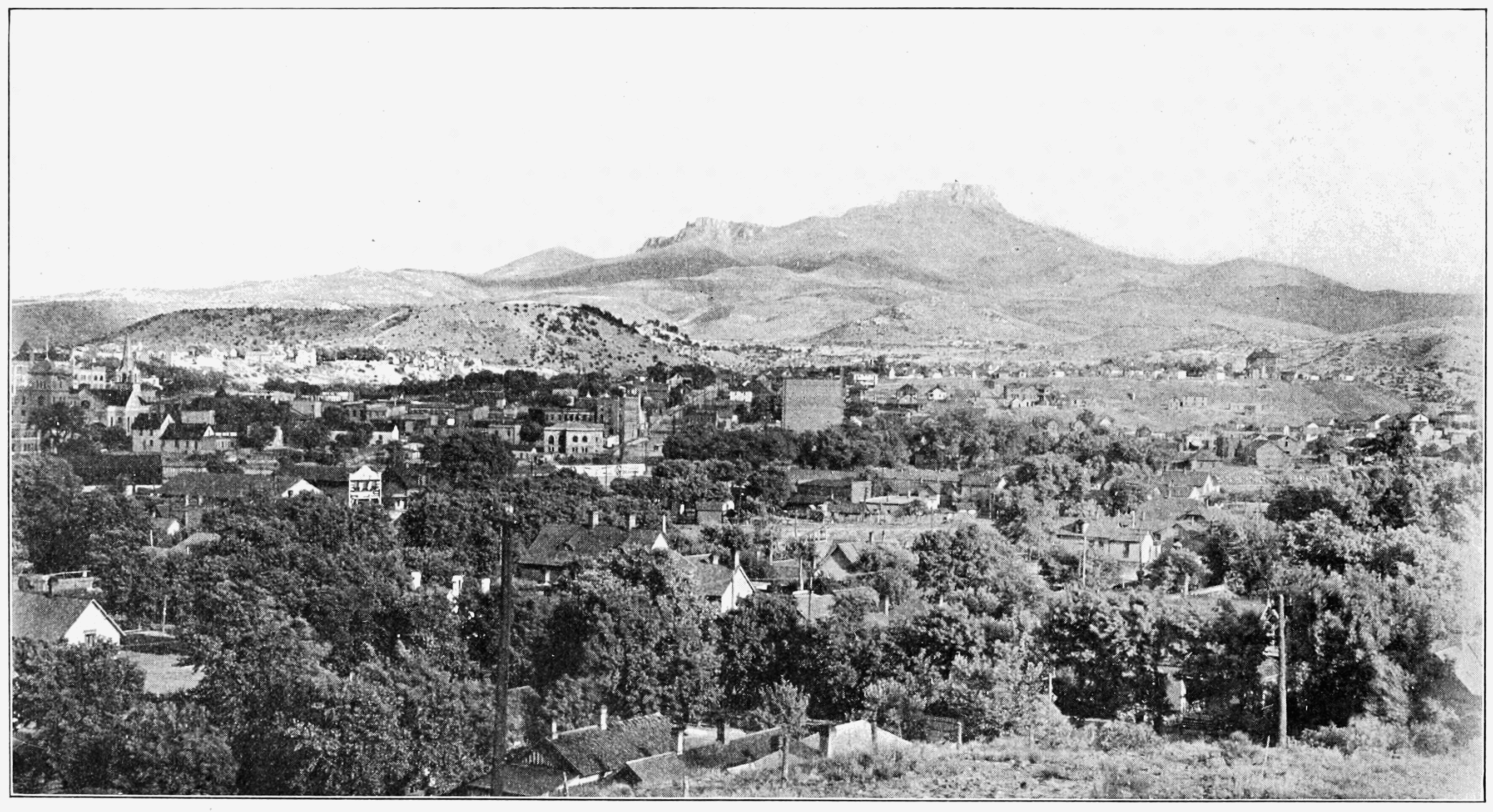
- Raton Mesa overlooking Trinidad, Colorado, c. 1909
- Interactive map of Raton Mesa
- Location: Las Animas County, Colorado, United States

U.S. National Natural Landmark
- Designated: 1967

Raton Mesa (formerly known as Raton Mountain) is a mesa in Las Animas County, Colorado, United States, overlooking the town of Trinidad. The highest point of Raton Mesa is Fishers Peak. In 1967, the Department of the Interior designated it as a National Natural Landmark.

Raton Mesa is the namesake for Raton Pass and also lends its name to the cluster of mesas that separate northeastern New Mexico from southeastern Colorado, collectively recognized as the Raton Mesas (formerly known as the Raton Mountains).

Raton Mesas are volcanic in origin caused by lava flows which solidified into basalt. Over time the softer sedimentary rock surrounding the basalt eroded leaving several distinct large, elevated tablelands with precipitous sides.

The Raton Mesas begin at the Sangre de Cristo Mountains to the west and extend eastward for 90 miles (140 km) along the Colorado-New Mexico border to the Oklahoma panhandle. In addition to Raton Mesa proper, the major mesas within this cluster include Bartlett Mesa, Horseshoe Mesa, and Johnson Mesa. East of the major mesas, between Branson, Colorado, and the Black Mesa of Oklahoma, lies a scattering of minor mesas known as "Mesa de Maya."

Much like how "New York" refers to both a city and a state, "Raton" is used to refer to both a specific mesa and the larger collection of mesas.

== Description ==
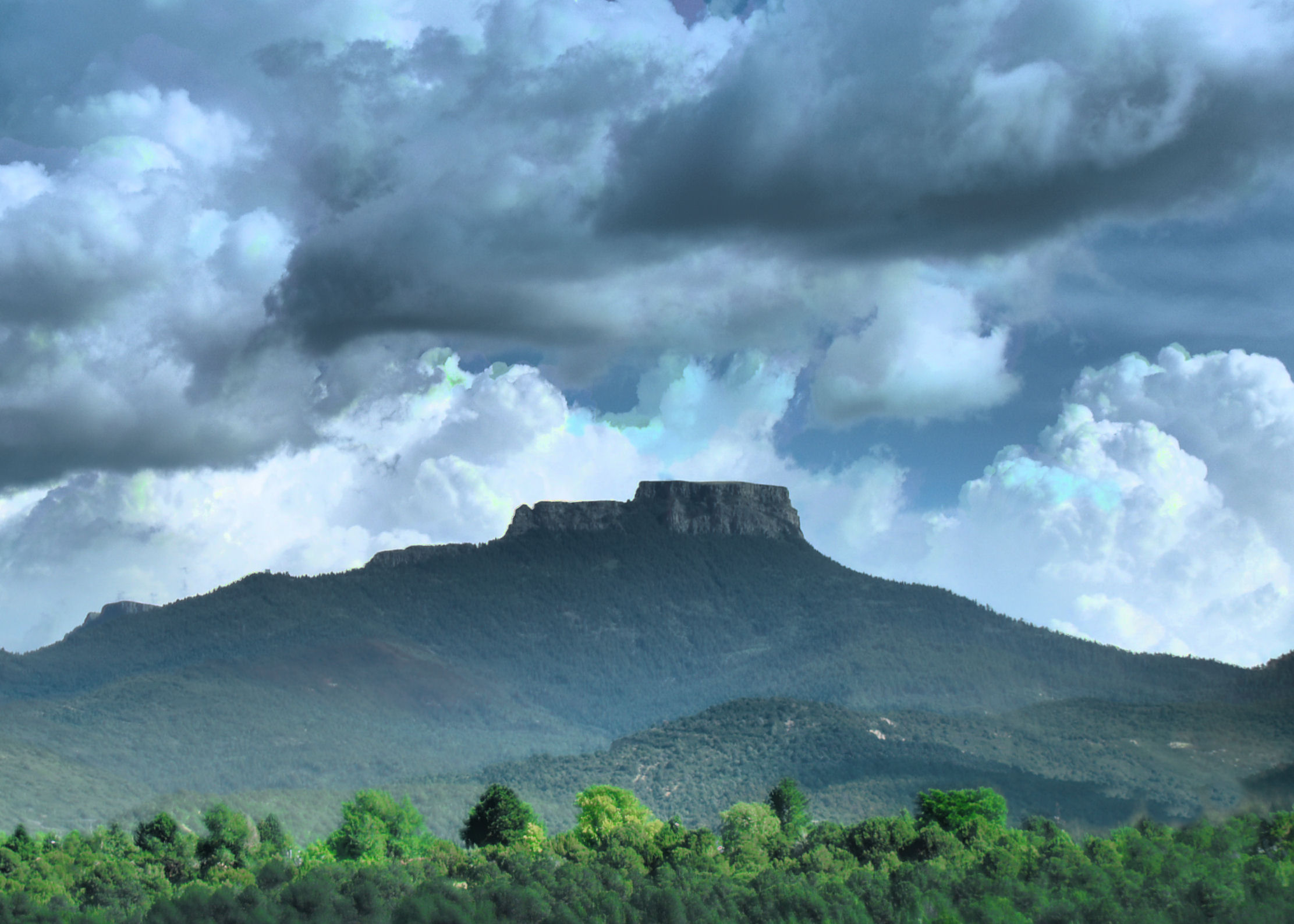
Fishers Peak is the highest point on Raton Mesa.

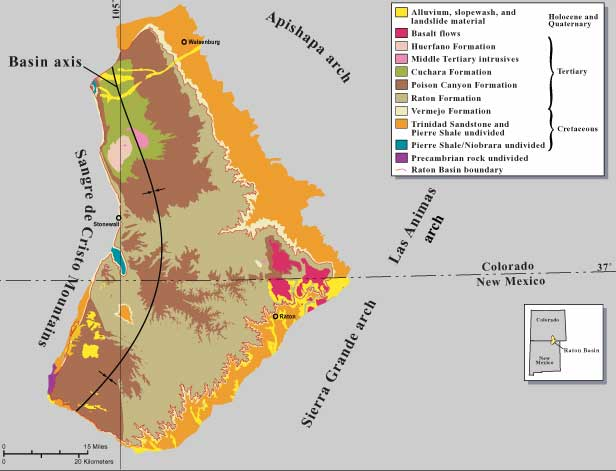
A geologic map of the Raton Basin. The Raton mesas are shown in red.

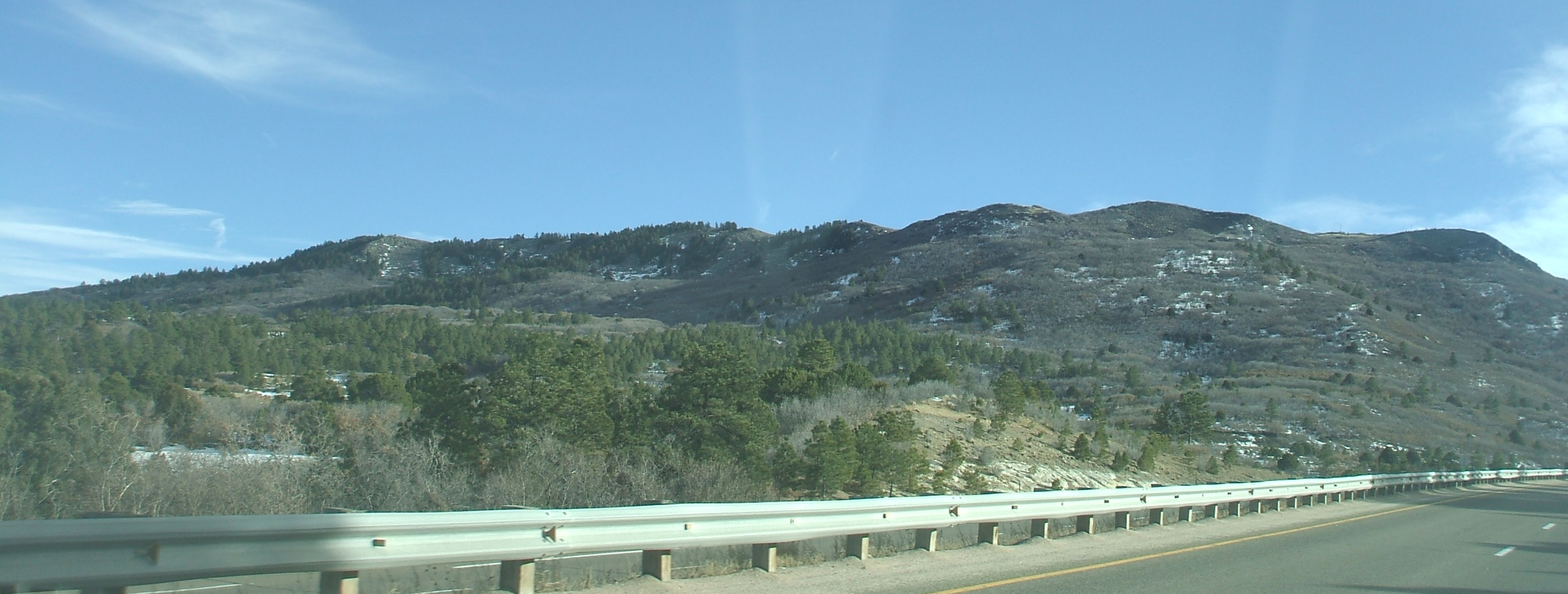
Bartlett Mesa rises above Raton Pass and Interstate Highway 25.

Interstate Highway 25 through Raton Pass, 7,834 feet (2,388 m) in elevation, separates the foothills of the Sangre de Cristo Mountains to the west from the mesa country on the east. For this article, Raton Mesa is defined as the area east of Interstate 25 between Trinidad, Colorado and Raton, New Mexico, approximately 19 miles (31 km) south to north, and extending eastwards about 13 miles (21 km). Within this area are three distinct mesas separated by deep canyons: Fishers Peak Mesa in Colorado, with a maximum elevation of 9,633 feet (2,936 m), Bartlett Mesa, mostly in New Mexico, with a maximum elevation of 8,900 feet (2,700 m), and Barela/Horseshoe/Horse Mesa, straddling the Colorado/New Mexico state line, with a maximum elevation of 8,757 feet (2,669 m). The elevations at the foot of the mesas are 6,000 feet (1,800 m) or higher.

The flat-topped mesas are mostly grassland, but their steep slopes are wooded with ponderosa pine the dominant species, joined by quaking aspen, Douglas fir, and white fir at higher elevations and pinyon, juniper, and Gambel oak at lower elevations. Mammal species include American black bear, cougar, mule deer, beaver, and especially elk which are seen in herds of more than 100 individuals. Hunting, especially for elk, is popular in season on both public and private lands.

No public roads reach the top of the mesas. The only public road which penetrates the area is through Sugarite Canyon State Park in New Mexico. It terminates shortly after crossing the border into Colorado at an altitude of 7,560 feet (2,300 m). This road provides access to the three publicly owned areas of Raton Mesa: Surgarite Canyon State Park 3,600 acres (15 km^{2}) in New Mexico and Lake Dorothey State Wildlife Area 5,152 acres (20.85 km^{2}) and James M. John State Wildlife Area 8,339 acres (33.75 km^{2}) in Colorado. From the parking area at Lake Dorothey, the summit of Fisher's Peak is a straight-line distance of about eight miles by an unmarked trail.

Much of the Colorado portion of the Raton Mesa, including Fisher's Peak, was owned by the Crazy French Ranch until 2019 when the 19,200 acres (7,800 ha) ranch was purchased to become a Colorado state park. Funds to purchase the ranch came jointly from Great Outdoors Colorado, the funding arm of the Colorado Lottery, The Nature Conservancy, and the Trust for Public Land.
