= Medicine Bow Peak =

Mountain in United States of America

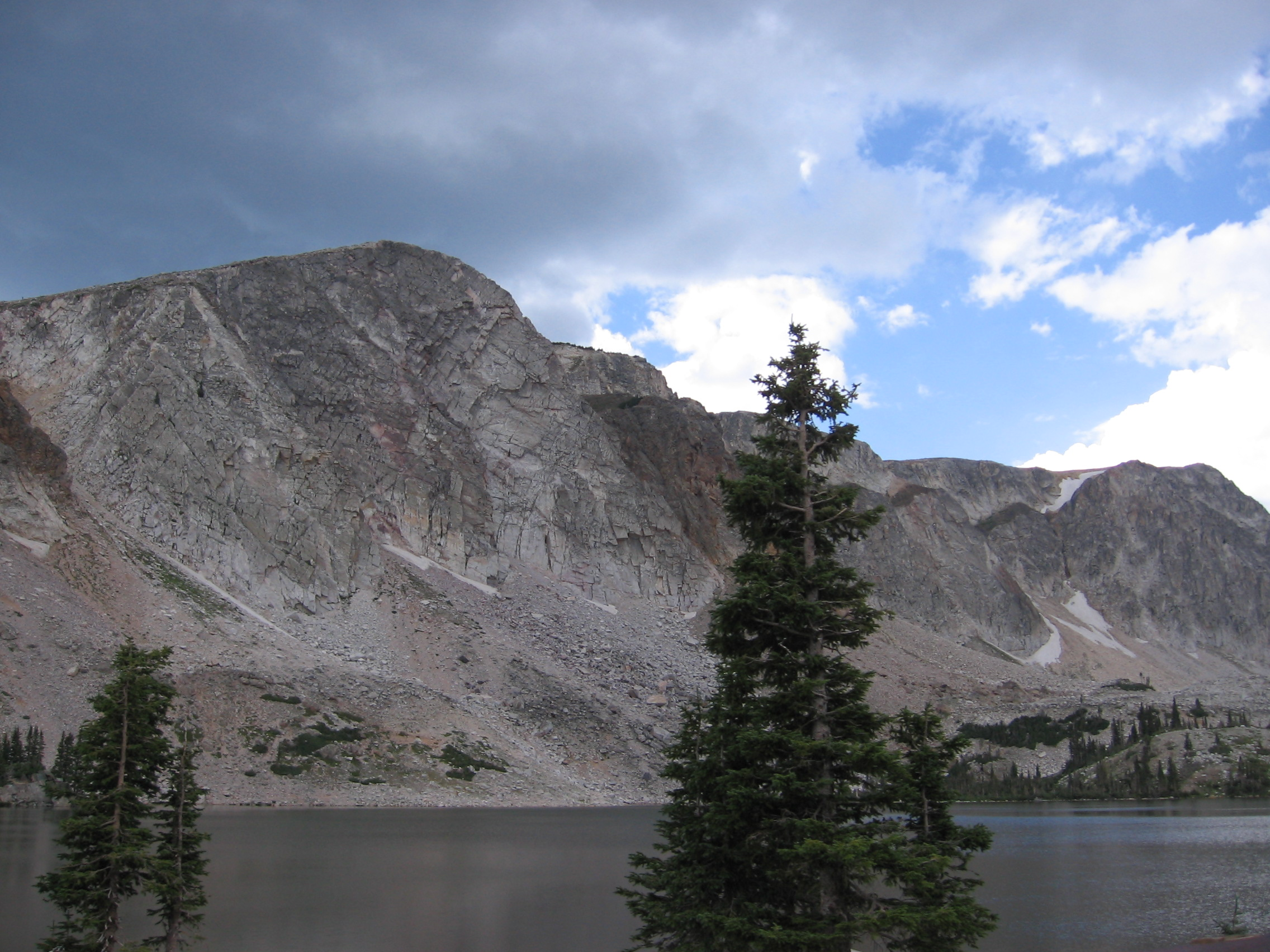
- Southern extent of Medicine Bow Peak rising above Lake Marie.

Highest point
- Elevation: 12,018 ft (3,663 m)
- Prominence: 3233
- Coordinates: 41°21′35.99″N 106°19′11.99″W

Geography
- Location: Albany and Carbon counties, Wyoming, U.S.
- Parent range: Medicine Bow Mountains
- Topo map: USGS Medicine Bow Peak (WY)

Geology
- Mountain type: quartzite

Climbing
- Easiest route: Hike

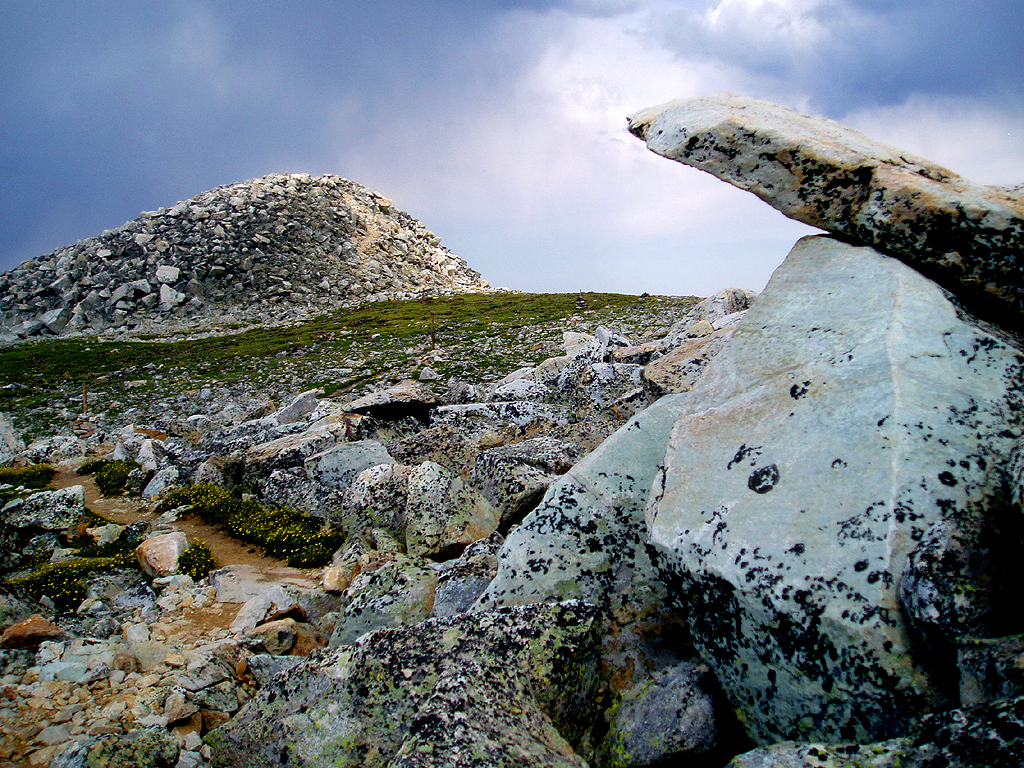
Summit of Medicine Bow Peak

Medicine Bow Peak (12,018 ft (3,663 m)) is the highest peak in the Snowy Range, a subrange of the Medicine Bow Mountains, about 35 miles (56 km) west of Laramie, Wyoming. It lies within Medicine Bow National Forest and is the highest point in southern Wyoming. The mountain peak lies in extreme western Albany County, but the lower reaches stretch westward into eastern Carbon County. The summit is visible from Snowy Range Pass (10,847 ft (3,300 m)) on Wyoming Highway 130, a Wyoming Scenic Byway. The most-common route to the summit is a four-mile hike featuring switch-backs and a great deal of loose rock; trails to the peak are usually open from early June to mid October.

The mountain is usually covered with snow from October to late June. During winter, the peak can be summited by snowshoeing or skiing. Summer conditions can be extreme, with frequent thunderstorms and hail during the afternoons.

== Geology ==
The peak is part of a proterozoic quartzite ridge that juts above the Snowy Range. It was glaciated until quite recently, and year-round snowfields are still present on its flanks. Periglacial polygons, also known as "stone nets", are located above the timberline. Several glacial lakes are located at the base of the peak.

Geologic publications have suggested that the Snowy Pass Supergroup at the peak is significantly older than, and unrelated to, the orogeny of the surrounding Medicine Bow mountains. These publications often refer to the mountain as "Medicine Peak", and its rock as "Precambrian Medicine Peak Quartzite". The quartzite, which lies unconformably on gneissic basement rock, has been analyzed for traces of Precambrian life. The findings may be pseudofossils.

== Climate ==
Climate data for Medicine Bow Peak 41.3570 N, 106.3242 W, Elevation: 11,644 ft (3,549 m) (1991–2020 normals)
Month	Jan	Feb	Mar	Apr	May	Jun	Jul	Aug	Sep	Oct	Nov	Dec	Year
Mean daily maximum °F (°C)	21.4 (−5.9)	22.3 (−5.4)	28.9 (−1.7)	34.0 (1.1)	43.8 (6.6)	54.9 (12.7)	62.9 (17.2)	61.0 (16.1)	52.6 (11.4)	39.5 (4.2)	28.5 (−1.9)	21.3 (−5.9)	39.3 (4.0)
Daily mean °F (°C)	12.1 (−11.1)	12.1 (−11.1)	18.2 (−7.7)	23.4 (−4.8)	32.7 (0.4)	42.6 (5.9)	50.1 (10.1)	48.5 (9.2)	41.1 (5.1)	29.5 (−1.4)	19.5 (−6.9)	12.2 (−11.0)	28.5 (−1.9)
Mean daily minimum °F (°C)	2.8 (−16.2)	2.0 (−16.7)	7.5 (−13.6)	12.7 (−10.7)	21.6 (−5.8)	30.3 (−0.9)	37.3 (2.9)	36.1 (2.3)	29.5 (−1.4)	19.5 (−6.9)	10.6 (−11.9)	3.1 (−16.1)	17.8 (−7.9)
Average precipitation inches (mm)	6.05 (154)	5.00 (127)	5.07 (129)	6.18 (157)	5.17 (131)	2.48 (63)	1.79 (45)	1.74 (44)	2.66 (68)	3.96 (101)	5.27 (134)	5.65 (144)	51.02 (1,297)
Source: PRISM Climate Group

== History ==
Little is known of the mountain's history before the John C. Frémont expeditions of 1843 - 1844. Native American tribes such as the Northern Arapahoe, Northern Cheyenne, Lakota, Ute, and Eastern Shoshone were known to have either inhabited the surrounding lowlands or used nearby canyons and mountain passes as travel routes.

In 1955, United Airlines Flight 409 crashed into the side of the mountain; there were no survivors. Engines and other fragments of the plane are still present at the base of the cliff. During the recovery process, several additional access routes were established, which are still in use today.

A memorial stone and plaque were placed near the crash site, known as "Disaster Wall", in August 2001.

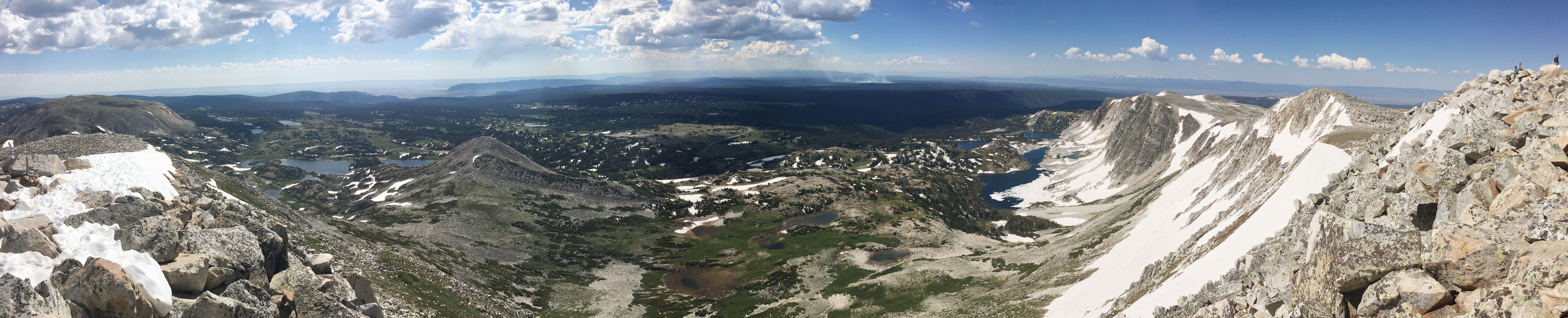
View from the summit of Medicine Bow Peak

== Ecology ==
Biomes on the trails leading to the peak include alpine meadows, sub-alpine meadows, and taiga. Stunted and twisted Krummholtz trees, many of which are Engelmann spruce, are common at or just above the tree line. The wildflowers along its access trails include Indian Paintbrush, blue columbine, gentian, and harebell. The peak is located in a Special Botanical Area.

Mammals inhabiting the peak and its immediate surroundings include bighorn sheep, marmots, pikas, pine martens, mule deer, moose, and dwarf shrew.

== Maps ==
- Medicine Bow Peak page at peakbagger.com
- TopoQuest.com Topographic map of Medicine Bow Peak
- Medicine Bow Peak Trail Review from Trails.com
- Photos of the peak and its access trails
- US Forest Service Medicine Bow - Routt National Forests
