= Arapaho Glacier =

Glacier in Colorado, USA

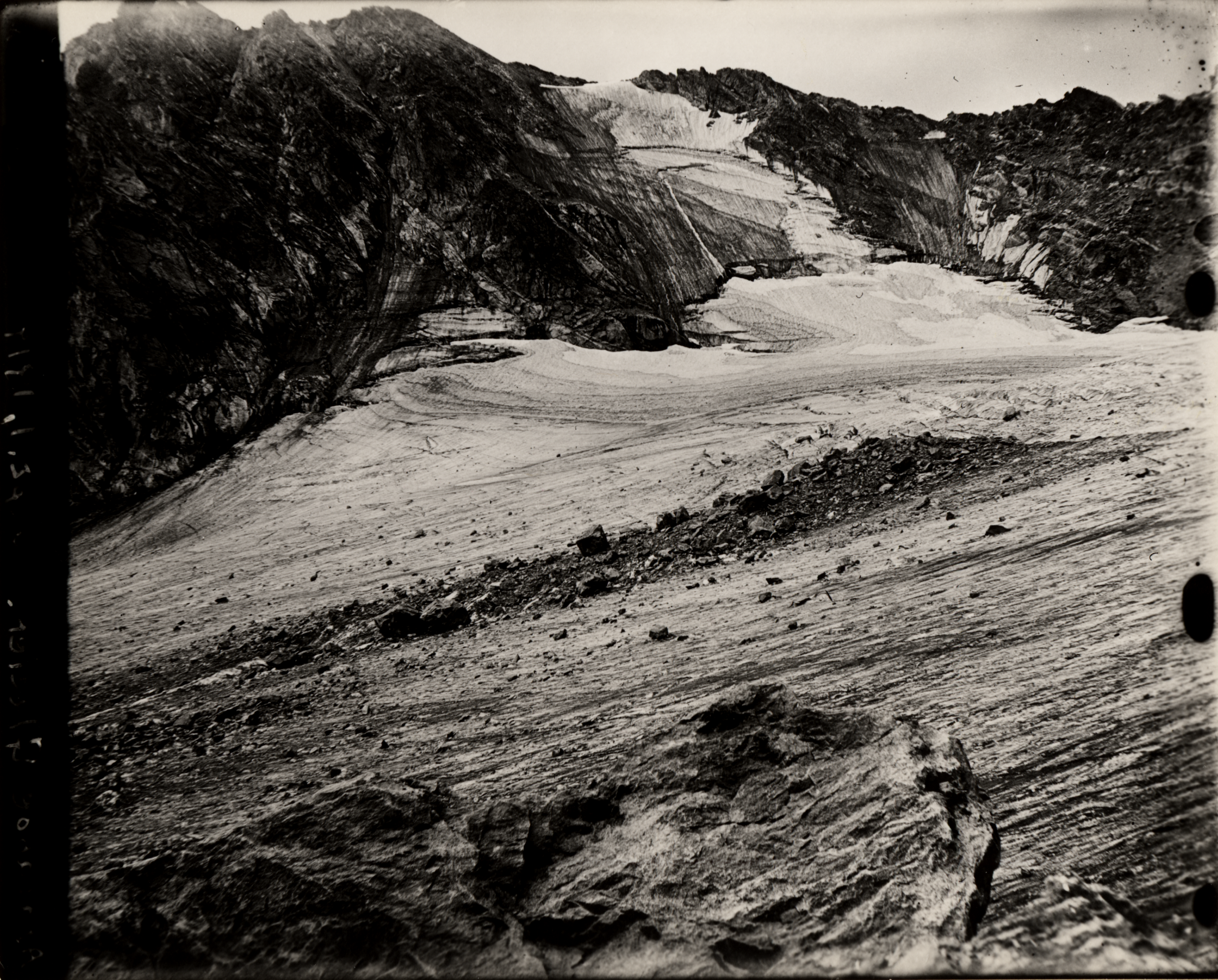

- Location within Colorado
- Type: Mountain glacier
- Location: Boulder County, Colorado, United States
- Coordinates: 40°01′24″N 105°38′52″W
- Area: 39 acres (16 ha)
- Length: .25 mi (0.40 km) long and .50 mi (0.80 km) wide
- Thickness: 15 ft (4.6 m)
- Terminus: Talus/proglacial lake
- Status: Retreating

Arapaho Glacier is an alpine glacier in a cirque immediately southeast of North Arapaho Peak, in Roosevelt National Forest in the U.S. state of Colorado. The glacier is just east of the Continental Divide. Arapaho Glacier is the largest glacier in the state of Colorado and helps provide water for the city of Boulder, Colorado. The glacier has a negative glacier mass balance and lost over 52% of its surface area during the 20th Century.

== See also ==
- List of glaciers in the United States
