= Arapaho Pass (Front Range) =

Mountain pass in Colorado, USA

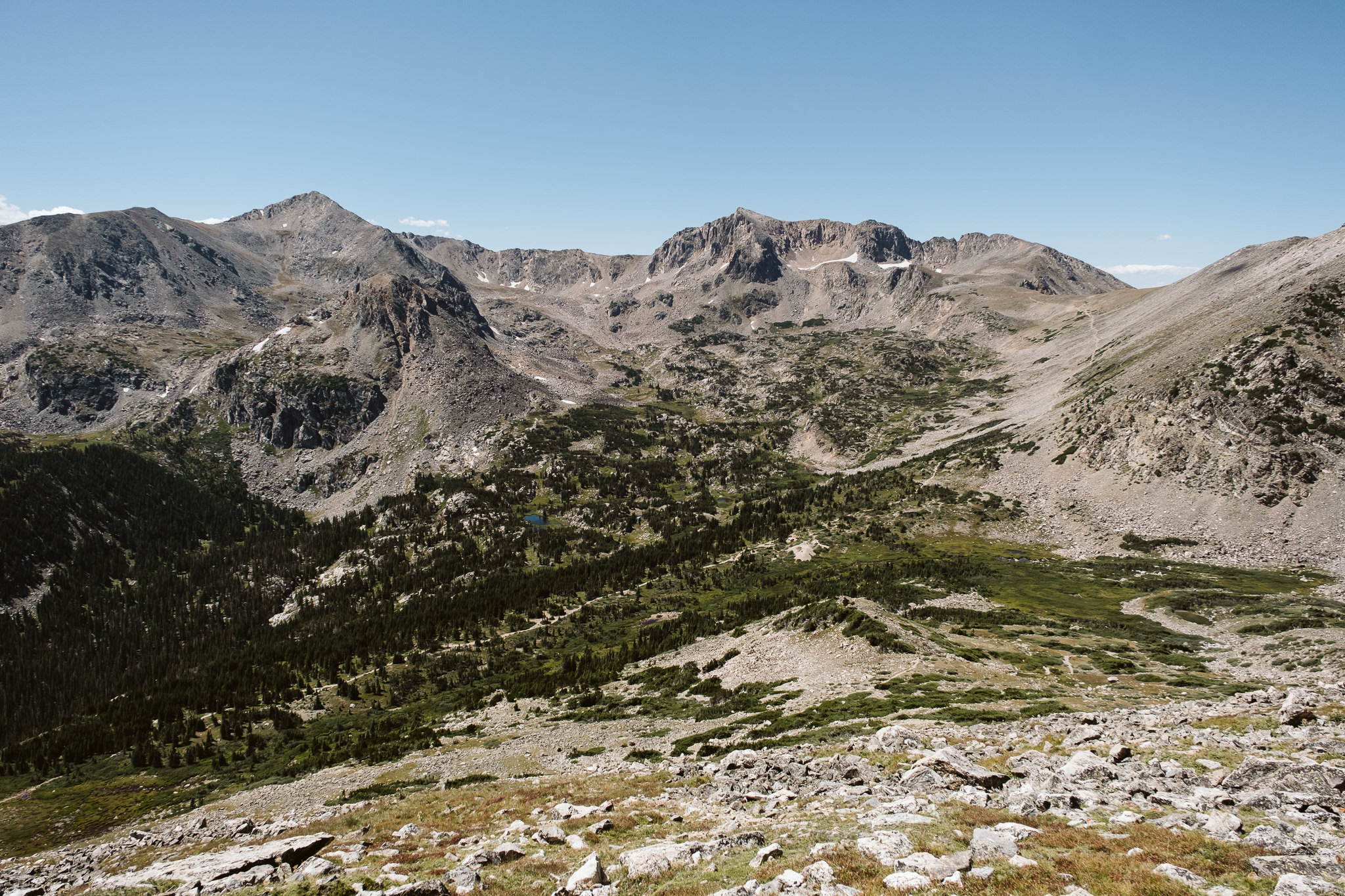
- Arapaho Pass seen from South Arapaho Peak trail
- Interactive map of Arapaho Pass
- Elevation: 11,906 ft (3,629 m)
- Traversed by: trail

Third Approach
- Location: Boulder / Grand counties, Colorado, U.S.
- Range: Front Range
- Coordinates: 40°00′52″N 105°40′41″W
- Topo map: USGS Monarch Lake

Arapaho Pass, elevation 11,906 ft (3,629 m), is a mountain pass that crosses the Continental Divide in the Front Range of the Rocky Mountains of Colorado in the United States.
