= List of Colorado county high points =

The 64 counties of the U.S. State of Colorado

This is a list of the 64 counties of the U.S. State of Colorado by their points of highest elevation. Of the 50 highest county high points in the United States, 30 are located in Colorado. The highest point in Colorado and the Rocky Mountains as a whole is the summit of Mount Elbert in Lake County at 14,440 feet (4,401.2 m).

Of the 64 Colorado counties, 20 counties rise above 14,000 feet (4,267 m) elevation, 32 counties rise above 13,000 feet (3,962 m), 42 counties rise above 10,000 feet (3,048 m), and all 64 Colorado counties rise above 4,116 feet (1,255 m).

Use the "Map this section's coordinates" link to view the location of each of the Colorado county high points.

== Colorado county high points ==
Colorado county high points
County	Rank	High point	Region	Elevation	Prominence	Isolation	Location
Lake County	1	Mount Elbert (Note: The summit of Mount Elbert is the highest point of the Rocky Mountains, the State of Colorado, and Lake County.) (Note: The elevation of Mount Elbert includes an adjustment of +1.995 m (6.55 ft) from NGVD 29 to NAVD 88.)	Sawatch Range	14,440 ft 4401 m	9,093 ft 2772 m	671 mi 1,079 km	39°07′04″N 106°26′43″W
Chaffee County	2	Mount Harvard (Note: The summit of Mount Harvard is the highest point of the Collegiate Peaks and Chaffee County, Colorado.) (Note: The elevation of Mount Harvard includes an adjustment of +2.084 m (6.84 ft) from NGVD 29 to NAVD 88.)	Sawatch Range	14,421 ft 4396 m	2,360 ft 719 m	14.92 mi 24 km	38°55′28″N 106°19′15″W
Alamosa County	3	Blanca Peak (Note: The summit of Blanca Peak is the highest point of the Sierra Blanca Massif, the Sangre de Cristo Mountains, Alamosa County and Costilla County, Colorado.) (Note: The elevation of Blanca Peak includes an adjustment of +1.754 m (5.75 ft) from NGVD 29 to NAVD 88.)	Sangre de Cristo Mountains	14,351 ft 4374 m	5,326 ft 1623 m	103.4 mi 166.4 km	37°34′38″N 105°29′09″W
Costilla County	3	Blanca Peak	Sangre de Cristo Mountains	14,351 ft 4374 m	5,326 ft 1623 m	103.4 mi 166.4 km	37°34′38″N 105°29′09″W
Huerfano County	5	Blanca Peak Tripoint (Note: The Blanca Peak Tripoint is the highest point of Huerfano County, Colorado. The Tripoint is located 140 feet (43 m) north-northeast and 25 feet (7.6 m) below the summit of Blanca Peak. The Tripoint is the junction of Alamosa, Costilla, and Huerfano counties. This point gave surveyors a better point to set the intersection of the three counties than the summit itself.) (Note: The elevation of Blanca Peak Tripoint includes an adjustment of +1.755 m (5.76 ft) from NGVD 29 to NAVD 88.)	Sangre de Cristo Mountains	14,326 ft 4366 m	0 ft 0 m	0 mi 0 km	37°34′40″N 105°29′07″W
Hinsdale County	6	Uncompahgre Peak (Note: The summit of Uncompahgre Peak is the highest point of the San Juan Mountains and Hinsdale County, Colorado.) (Note: The elevation of Uncompahgre Peak includes an adjustment of +1.967 m (6.45 ft) from NGVD 29 to NAVD 88.)	San Juan Mountains	14,321 ft 4365 m	4,277 ft 1304 m	85.1 mi 136.9 km	38°04′18″N 107°27′44″W
Saguache County	7	Crestone Peak (Note: The summit of Crestone Peak is the highest point of the northern Sangre de Cristo Mountains and Saguache County, Colorado.) (Note: The elevation of Crestone Peak includes an adjustment of +1.76 m (5.77 ft) from NGVD 29 to NAVD 88.)	Sangre de Cristo Mountains	14,300 ft 4359 m	4,554 ft 1388 m	27.4 mi 44 km	37°58′00″N 105°35′07″W
Park County	8	Mount Lincoln (Note: The summit of Mount Lincoln is the highest point of the Mosquito Range and Park County, Colorado.) (Note: The elevation of Mount Lincoln includes an adjustment of +2.098 m (6.88 ft) from NGVD 29 to NAVD 88.)	Mosquito Range	14,293 ft 4357 m	3,862 ft 1177 m	22.5 mi 36.2 km	39°21′05″N 106°06′42″W
Gunnison County	9	Castle Peak (Note: The summit of Castle Peak is the highest point of the Elk Mountains, Gunnison County and Pitkin County, Colorado.) (Note: The elevation of Castle Peak includes an adjustment of +2.165 m (7.1 ft) from NGVD 29 to NAVD 88.)	Elk Mountains	14,279 ft 4352 m	2,365 ft 721 m	20.9 mi 33.6 km	39°00′35″N 106°51′01″W
Pitkin County	9	Castle Peak	Elk Mountains	14,279 ft 4352 m	2,365 ft 721 m	20.9 mi 33.6 km	39°00′35″N 106°51′01″W
Clear Creek County	11	Grays Peak (Note: The summit of Grays Peak is the highest point of the Front Range, the Continental Divide of North America, Clear Creek County and Summit County, Colorado.) (Note: The elevation of Grays Peak includes an adjustment of +1.881 m (6.17 ft) from NGVD 29 to NAVD 88.)	Front Range	14,278 ft 4352 m	2,770 ft 844 m	25 mi 40.2 km	39°38′02″N 105°49′03″W
Summit County	11	Grays Peak	Front Range	14,278 ft 4352 m	2,770 ft 844 m	25 mi 40.2 km	39°38′02″N 105°49′03″W
Custer County	13	Crestone East Peak (Note: The summit of Crestone East Peak is the highest point of Custer County, Colorado.) (Note: Crestone East Peak is located 432 feet (132 m) east-northeast and 34 feet (10.4 m) below the summit of Crestone Peak.) (Note: The elevation of Crestone East Peak includes an adjustment of +1.762 m (5.78 ft) from NGVD 29 to NAVD 88.)	Sangre de Cristo Mountains	14,266 ft 4348 m	80 ft 24 m	0.08 mi 0.13 km	37°58′02″N 105°35′03″W
Boulder County	14	Longs Peak (Note: The summit of Longs Peak is the highest point of the northern Front Range, Rocky Mountain National Park, and Boulder County, Colorado.) (Note: The elevation of Longs Peak includes an adjustment of +1.652 m (5.42 ft) from NGVD 29 to NAVD 88.)	Front Range	14,259 ft 4346 m	2,940 ft 896 m	43.6 mi 70.2 km	40°15′18″N 105°36′54″W
Dolores County	15	Mount Wilson (Note: The summit of Mount Wilson is the highest point of the San Miguel Mountains and Dolores County, Colorado.) (Note: The elevation of Mount Wilson includes an adjustment of +1.899 m (6.23 ft) from NGVD 29 to NAVD 88.)	San Miguel Mountains	14,252 ft 4344 m	4,024 ft 1227 m	33 mi 53.1 km	37°50′21″N 107°59′29″W
Ouray County	16	Mount Sneffels (Note: The summit of Mount Sneffels is the highest point of the Sneffels Range and Ouray County, Colorado.) (Note: The elevation of Mount Sneffels includes an adjustment of +1.879 m (6.16 ft) from NGVD 29 to NAVD 88.)	San Juan Mountains	14,158 ft 4315 m	3,050 ft 930 m	15.71 mi 25.3 km	38°00′14″N 107°47′32″W
El Paso County	17	Pikes Peak (Note: The summit of Pikes Peak is the highest point of the southern Front Range and El Paso County, Colorado.) (Note: Pikes Peak is the easternmost 14,000-foot (4,267 m) summit of the United States. Pikes Peak was the inspiration for the lyrics of America the Beautiful..) (Note: The elevation of Pikes Peak includes an adjustment of +1.678 m (5.51 ft) from NGVD 29 to NAVD 88.)	Front Range	14,115 ft 4302 m	5,530 ft 1686 m	60.6 mi 97.6 km	38°50′26″N 105°02′39″W
La Plata County	18	Windom Peak (Note: The summit of Windom Peak is the highest point of the Needle Mountains and La Plata County, Colorado.) (Note: Mount Eolus may be higher than Windom Peak..) (Note: The elevation of Windom Peak includes an adjustment of +1.785 m (5.86 ft) from NGVD 29 to NAVD 88.)	Needle Mountains	14,093 ft 4296 m	2,187 ft 667 m	26.3 mi 42.4 km	37°37′16″N 107°35′31″W
San Miguel County	19	Wilson Peak (Note: The summit of Wilson Peak is the highest point of San Miguel County, Colorado.) (Note: The elevation of Wilson Peak includes an adjustment of +1.877 m (6.16 ft) from NGVD 29 to NAVD 88.)	San Miguel Mountains	14,023 ft 4274 m	857 ft 261 m	1.51 mi 2.43 km	37°51′37″N 107°59′05″W
Eagle County	20	Mount of the Holy Cross (Note: The summit of Mount of the Holy Cross is the highest point of the northern Sawatch Range and Eagle County, Colorado.) (Note: The summit elevation of Mount of the Holy Cross includes a vertical offset of +0.61 m (2 ft) from the station benchmark.) (Note: The elevation of Mount of the Holy Cross includes an adjustment of +1.926 m (6.32 ft) from NGVD 29 to NAVD 88.)	Sawatch Range	14,011 ft 4271 m	2,111 ft 643 m	18.41 mi 29.6 km	39°28′01″N 106°28′54″W
Mineral County	21	Phoenix Peak (Note: The summit of Phoenix Peak is the highest point of Mineral County, Colorado.) (Note: The elevation of Phoenix Peak includes an adjustment of +2.027 m (6.65 ft) from NGVD 29 to NAVD 88.)	La Garita Mountains	13,902 ft 4237 m	1,515 ft 462 m	4.97 mi 8 km	37°56′11″N 106°51′59″W
San Juan County	22	Vermilion Peak (Note: The summit of Vermilion Peak is the highest point of San Juan County, Colorado.) (Note: The elevation of Vermilion Peak includes an adjustment of +1.827 m (5.99 ft) from NGVD 29 to NAVD 88.)	San Juan Mountains	13,900 ft 4237 m	2,105 ft 642 m	9.07 mi 14.6 km	37°47′57″N 107°49′42″W
Las Animas County	23	West Spanish Peak (Note: The summit of West Spanish Peak is the highest point of Las Animas County, Colorado.) (Note: West Spanish Peak is the easternmost 13,000-foot (4,000 m) summit of the United States..) (Note: The elevation of West Spanish Peak includes an adjustment of +1.469 m (4.82 ft) from NGVD 29 to NAVD 88.)	Spanish Peaks	13,631 ft 4155 m	3,686 ft 1123 m	20.5 mi 33 km	37°22′32″N 104°59′37″W
Larimer County	24	Hagues Peak (Note: The summit of Hagues Peak is the highest point of the Mummy Range and Larimer County, Colorado.) (Note: The elevation of Hagues Peak includes an adjustment of +1.719 m (5.64 ft) from NGVD 29 to NAVD 88.)	Mummy Range	13,573 ft 4137 m	2,420 ft 738 m	15.7 mi 25.3 km	40°29′04″N 105°38′47″W
Grand County	25	Pettingell Peak (Note: The summit of Pettingell Peak is the highest point of Grand County, Colorado.) (Note: The elevation of Pettingell Peak includes an adjustment of +1.864 m (6.12 ft) from NGVD 29 to NAVD 88.)	Front Range	13,559 ft 4133 m	1,563 ft 476 m	4.41 mi 7.1 km	39°43′43″N 105°54′18″W
Archuleta County	26	Summit Peak (Note: The summit of Summit Peak is the highest point of the southern San Juan Mountains and Archuleta County, Colorado.) (Note: The summit elevation of Summit Peak includes a vertical offset of -0.15 m (-0.5 ft) from the station benchmark.) (Note: The elevation of Summit Peak includes an adjustment of +1.877 m (6.16 ft) from NGVD 29 to NAVD 88.)	San Juan Mountains	13,307 ft 4056 m	2,760 ft 841 m	39.6 mi 63.7 km	37°21′02″N 106°41′49″W
Gilpin County	27	James Peak (Note: The summit of James Peak is the highest point of Gilpin County, Colorado.) (Note: The elevation of James Peak includes an adjustment of +1.789 m (5.87 ft) from NGVD 29 to NAVD 88.)	Front Range	13,300 ft 4054 m	714 ft 218 m	1.55 mi 2.49 km	39°51′08″N 105°41′24″W
Montezuma County	28	Hesperus Mountain (Note: The summit of Hesperus Mountain is the highest point of the La Plata Mountains and Montezuma County, Colorado.) (Note: The elevation of Hesperus Mountain includes an adjustment of +1.65 m (5.41 ft) from NGVD 29 to NAVD 88.)	La Plata Mountains	13,237 ft 4035 m	2,852 ft 869 m	24.5 mi 39.5 km	37°26′42″N 108°05′20″W
Rio Grande County	29	Bennett Peak (Note: The summit of Bennett Peak is the highest point of Rio Grande County, Colorado.) (Note: The elevation of Bennett Peak includes an adjustment of +1.782 m (5.85 ft) from NGVD 29 to NAVD 88.)	San Juan Mountains	13,209 ft 4026 m	1,743 ft 531 m	17.08 mi 27.5 km	37°29′00″N 106°26′02″W
Conejos County	30	Conejos Peak (Note: The summit of Conejos Peak is the highest point of Conejos County, Colorado.) (Note: The elevation of Conejos Peak includes an adjustment of +1.792 m (5.88 ft) from NGVD 29 to NAVD 88.)	San Juan Mountains	13,179 ft 4017 m	1,912 ft 583 m	8.15 mi 13.12 km	37°17′19″N 106°34′15″W
Fremont County	31	Bushnell Peak (Note: The summit of Bushnell Peak is the highest point of Fremont County, Colorado.) (Note: The elevation of Bushnell Peak includes an adjustment of +1.737 m (5.7 ft) from NGVD 29 to NAVD 88.)	Sangre de Cristo Mountains	13,110 ft 3996 m	2,405 ft 733 m	11.07 mi 17.82 km	38°20′28″N 105°53′21″W
Teller County	32	Devils Playground (Note: The summit of Devils Playground is the highest point of Teller County, Colorado.) (Note: The Devils Playground is located 2.15 miles (3.46 km) northwest and 1,040 feet (317 m) below the summit of Pikes Peak. The Devils Playground is named for the way lightning sometimes dances around the prominence during lightning storms.) (Note: The elevation of Devils Playground includes an adjustment of +1.611 m (5.29 ft) from NGVD 29 to NAVD 88.)	Front Range	13,075 ft 3985 m	140 ft 43 m	1.17 mi 1.88 km	38°51′51″N 105°04′14″W
Jackson County	33	Clark Peak (Note: The summit of Clark Peak is the highest point of the Medicine Bow Mountains and Jackson County, Colorado.) (Note: The summit elevation of Clark Peak includes a vertical offset of +1.83 m (6 ft) from the station benchmark.) (Note: The elevation of Clark Peak includes an adjustment of +1.628 m (5.34 ft) from NGVD 29 to NAVD 88.)	Medicine Bow Mountains	12,960 ft 3950 m	2,771 ft 845 m	16.4 mi 26.4 km	40°36′25″N 105°55′48″W
Garfield County	34	Flat Top Mountain (Note: The summit of Flat Top Mountain is the highest point of the Flat Tops and Garfield County, Colorado.) (Note: The elevation of Flat Top Mountain includes an adjustment of +1.698 m (5.57 ft) from NGVD 29 to NAVD 88.)	Flat Tops	12,361 ft 3768 m	4,054 ft 1236 m	40.8 mi 65.6 km	40°00′53″N 107°05′00″W
Pueblo County	35	Greenhorn Mountain (Note: The summit of Greenhorn Mountain is the highest point of the Wet Mountains and Pueblo County, Colorado.) (Note: The elevation of Greenhorn Mountain includes an adjustment of +1.401 m (4.6 ft) from NGVD 29 to NAVD 88.)	Wet Mountains	12,352 ft 3765 m	3,777 ft 1151 m	25.2 mi 40.6 km	37°52′53″N 105°00′48″W
Routt County	36	Mount Zirkel (Note: The summit of Mount Zirkel is the highest point of the Park Range and Routt County, Colorado.) (Note: The elevation of Mount Zirkel includes an adjustment of +1.632 m (5.35 ft) from NGVD 29 to NAVD 88.)	Park Range	12,185 ft 3714 m	3,470 ft 1058 m	37.7 mi 60.6 km	40°49′52″N 106°39′47″W
Rio Blanco County	37	Blanco Point (Note: The elevation of Blanco Point includes an adjustment of +1.69 m (5.54 ft) from NGVD 29 to NAVD 88.)	Flat Tops	12,033 ft 3668 m	127 ft 39 m	1.96 mi 3.15 km	40°05′38″N 107°07′50″W
Jefferson County	38	Buffalo Peak (Note: The summit of Buffalo Peak is the highest point of Jefferson County, Colorado.) (Note: The elevation of Buffalo Peak includes an adjustment of +1.394 m (4.57 ft) from NGVD 29 to NAVD 88.)	Kenosha Mountains	11,594 ft 3534 m	929 ft 283 m	4.28 mi 6.89 km	39°16′32″N 105°22′05″W
Montrose County	39	Castle Rock (Note: The summit of Castle Rock is the highest point of Montrose County, Colorado.) (Note: The elevation of Castle Rock includes an adjustment of +1.638 m (5.37 ft) from NGVD 29 to NAVD 88.)	San Juan Mountains	11,458 ft 3493 m	433 ft 132 m	12.45 mi 20 km	38°18′34″N 107°37′59″W
Delta County	40	Mount Lamborn (Note: The summit of Mount Lamborn is the highest point of Delta County, Colorado.) (Note: The elevation of Mount Lamborn includes an adjustment of +1.648 m (5.41 ft) from NGVD 29 to NAVD 88.)	West Elk Mountains	11,402 ft 3475 m	1,616 ft 493 m	2.39 mi 3.84 km	38°48′10″N 107°31′22″W
Mesa County	41	Leon Peak (Note: The summit of Leon Peak is the highest point of Mesa County, Colorado.) (Note: The elevation of Leon Peak includes an adjustment of +1.666 m (5.47 ft) from NGVD 29 to NAVD 88.)	Grand Mesa	11,240 ft 3426 m	776 ft 237 m	9.03 mi 14.54 km	39°04′46″N 107°50′38″W
Moffat County	42	Black Mountain (Note: The elevation of Black Mountain includes an adjustment of +1.537 m (5.04 ft) from NGVD 29 to NAVD 88.)	Elkhead Mountains	10,865 ft 3312 m	2,440 ft 744 m	16.4 mi 26.4 km	40°47′29″N 107°23′15″W
Douglas County	43	Thunder Butte (Note: The summit of Thunder Butte is the highest point of Douglas County, Colorado.) (Note: The elevation of Thunder Butte includes an adjustment of +1.216 m (3.99 ft) from NGVD 29 to NAVD 88.)	Rampart Range	9,837 ft 2998 m	1,376 ft 419 m	10.28 mi 16.54 km	39°10′18″N 105°11′51″W
Elbert County	44	Elbert County High Point (Note: The elevation of Elbert County High Point includes an adjustment of +1.218 m (4 ft) from NGVD 29 to NAVD 88.)	Palmer Divide	7,374 ft 2248 m	NA	NA	39°07′51″N 104°38′17″W
Weld County	45	Weld County High Point (Note: The elevation of Weld County High Point includes an adjustment of +1.035 m (3.4 ft) from NGVD 29 to NAVD 88.)	High Plains	6,388 ft 1947 m	NA	NA	40°59′20″N 104°50′11″W
Arapahoe County	46	Smoky Hill Ridge (Note: The summit of Smoky Hill Ridge is the highest point of Arapahoe County, Colorado.) (Note: The elevation of Smoky Hill Ridge includes an adjustment of +0.967 m (3.17 ft) from NGVD 29 to NAVD 88.)	High Plains	6,218 ft 1895 m	NA	NA	39°33′58″N 104°40′33″W
Lincoln County	47	Lincoln County High Point (Note: The elevation of Lincoln County High Point includes an adjustment of +0.931 m (3.05 ft) from NGVD 29 to NAVD 88.)	High Plains	5,973 ft 1821 m	NA	NA	38°51′58″N 104°03′19″W
City and County of Broomfield	48	Broomfield High Point (Note: The elevation of Broomfield High Point includes an adjustment of +1.017 m (3.34 ft) from NGVD 29 to NAVD 88.)	High Plains	5,848 ft 1783 m	NA	NA	39°54′38″N 105°09′56″W
City and County of Denver	49	Denver High Point (Note: The elevation of Denver High Point includes an adjustment of +0.941 m (3.09 ft) from NGVD 29 to NAVD 88.)	High Plains	5,688 ft 1734 m	NA	NA	39°37′36″N 105°06′36″W
Adams County	50	Adams County High Point (Note: The elevation of Adams County High Point includes an adjustment of +0.928 m (3.04 ft) from NGVD 29 to NAVD 88.)	High Plains	5,668 ft 1728 m	20 ft 6 m	8.17 mi 13.15 km	39°45′17″N 104°40′07″W
Washington County	51	President's Hill (Note: The elevation of President's Hill includes an adjustment of +0.814 m (2.67 ft) from NGVD 29 to NAVD 88.)	High Plains	5,433 ft 1656 m	NA	NA	39°33′58″N 103°33′29″W
Kit Carson County	52	Kit Carson County High Point (Note: The elevation of Kit Carson County High Point includes an adjustment of +0.73 m (2.4 ft) from NGVD 29 to NAVD 88.)	High Plains	5,297 ft 1615 m	NA	NA	39°03′30″N 103°09′47″W
Baca County	53	Carrizo Mountain East Slope (Note: The east slope of Carrizo Mountain is the highest point of Baca County, Colorado..) (Note: The elevation of Carrizo Mountain East Slope includes an adjustment of +0.769 m (2.52 ft) from NGVD 29 to NAVD 88.)	High Plains	5,293 ft 1613 m	NA	NA	37°10′44″N 103°05′11″W
Otero County	54	Dry Bluff Southeast (Note: Dry Bluff Southeast is the highest point of Otero County, Colorado..) (Note: The elevation of Dry Bluff Southeast includes an adjustment of +0.83 m (2.72 ft) from NGVD 29 to NAVD 88.)	High Plains	5,273 ft 1607 m	NA	NA	37°42′35″N 104°03′00″W
Cheyenne County	55	Overland Benchmark East (Note: Overland Benchmark East is the highest point of Cheyenne County, Colorado..) (Note: The elevation of Overland Benchmark East includes an adjustment of +0.725 m (2.38 ft) from NGVD 29 to NAVD 88.)	High Plains	5,257 ft 1602 m	NA	NA	39°02′15″N 103°09′48″W
Crowley County	56	Crowley County High Point (Note: The elevation of Crowley County High Point includes an adjustment of +0.838 m (2.75 ft) from NGVD 29 to NAVD 88.)	High Plains	5,228 ft 1593 m	NA	NA	38°31′16″N 104°02′36″W
Logan County	57	Billy Goat Hill (Note: The elevation of Billy Goat Hill includes an adjustment of +0.693 m (2.27 ft) from NGVD 29 to NAVD 88.)	High Plains	4,947 ft 1508 m	NA	NA	40°59′55″N 103°34′26″W
Morgan County	58	Shannon Benchmark (Note: The summit of Shannon Benchmark is the highest point of Morgan County, Colorado.) (Note: The elevation of Shannon Benchmark includes an adjustment of +0.757 m (2.48 ft) from NGVD 29 to NAVD 88.)	High Plains	4,938 ft 1505 m	NA	NA	40°29′51″N 104°03′05″W
Bent County	59	Bent County High Point (Note: The elevation of Bent County High Point includes an adjustment of +0.696 m (2.28 ft) from NGVD 29 to NAVD 88.)	High Plains	4,857 ft 1481 m	325 ft 99 m	5.29 mi 8.52 km	37°40′00″N 103°22′51″W
Prowers County	60	Two Buttes South (Note: The south summit of Two Buttes is the highest point of Prowers County, Colorado..) (Note: The elevation of Two Buttes South includes an adjustment of +0.593 m (1.95 ft) from NGVD 29 to NAVD 88.)	High Plains	4,713 ft 1437 m	356 ft 109 m	16.68 mi 26.9 km	37°39′34″N 102°32′32″W
Kiowa County	61	Kiowa County High Point (Note: The elevation of Kiowa County High Point includes an adjustment of +0.668 m (2.19 ft) from NGVD 29 to NAVD 88.)	High Plains	4,697 ft 1432 m	10 ft 3 m	0.53 mi 0.85 km	38°31′07″N 103°15′59″W
Yuma County	62	Yuma County High Point (Note: The elevation of Yuma County High Point includes an adjustment of +0.608 m (1.99 ft) from NGVD 29 to NAVD 88.)	High Plains	4,447 ft 1355 m	NA	NA	39°34′04″N 102°48′10″W
Sedgwick County	63	Sedgwick County High Point (Note: The elevation of Sedgwick County High Point includes an adjustment of +0.53 m (1.74 ft) from NGVD 29 to NAVD 88.)	High Plains	4,127 ft 1258 m	NA	NA	40°47′08″N 102°39′05″W
Phillips County	64	Phillips County High Point (Note: The elevation of Phillips County High Point includes an adjustment of +0.535 m (1.76 ft) from NGVD 29 to NAVD 88.)	High Plains	4,117 ft 1255 m	NA	NA	40°30′47″N 102°39′54″W

== Gallery ==
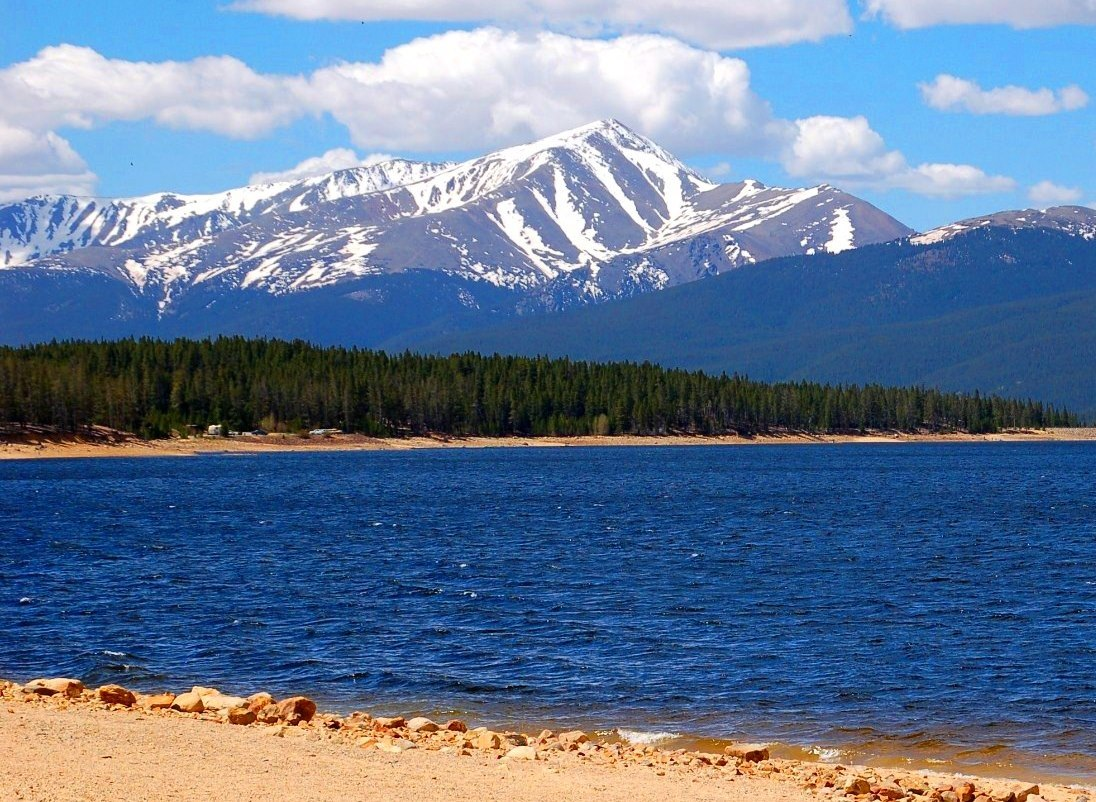
1. Mount Elbert in Lake County

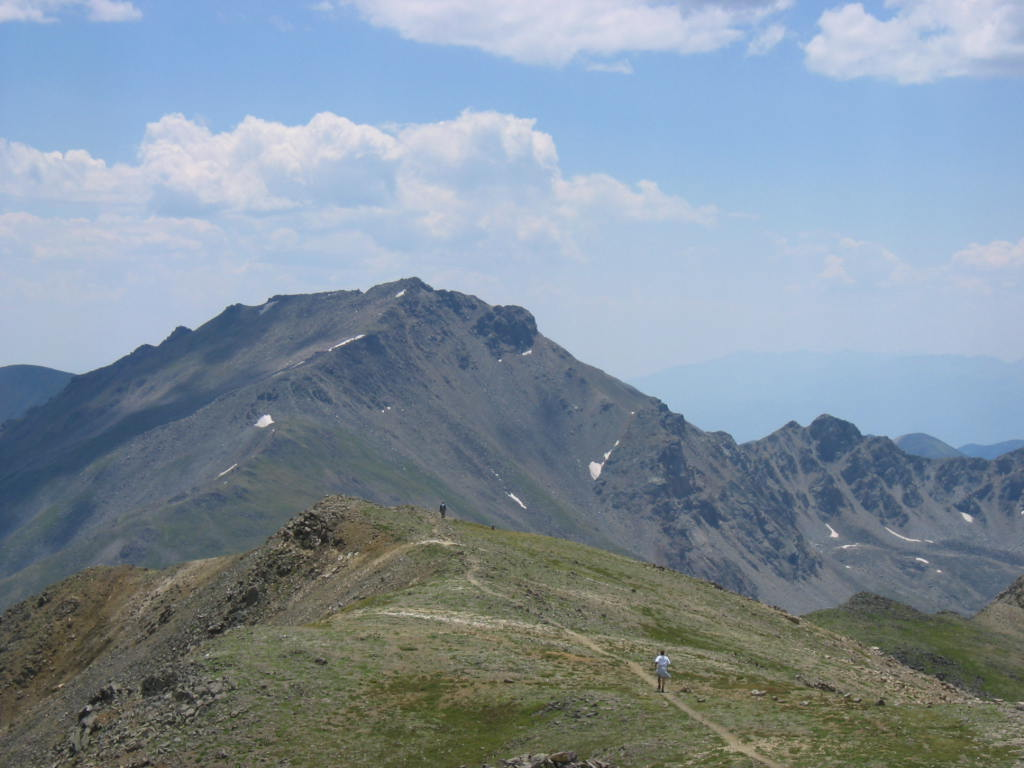
2. Mount Harvard in Chaffee County

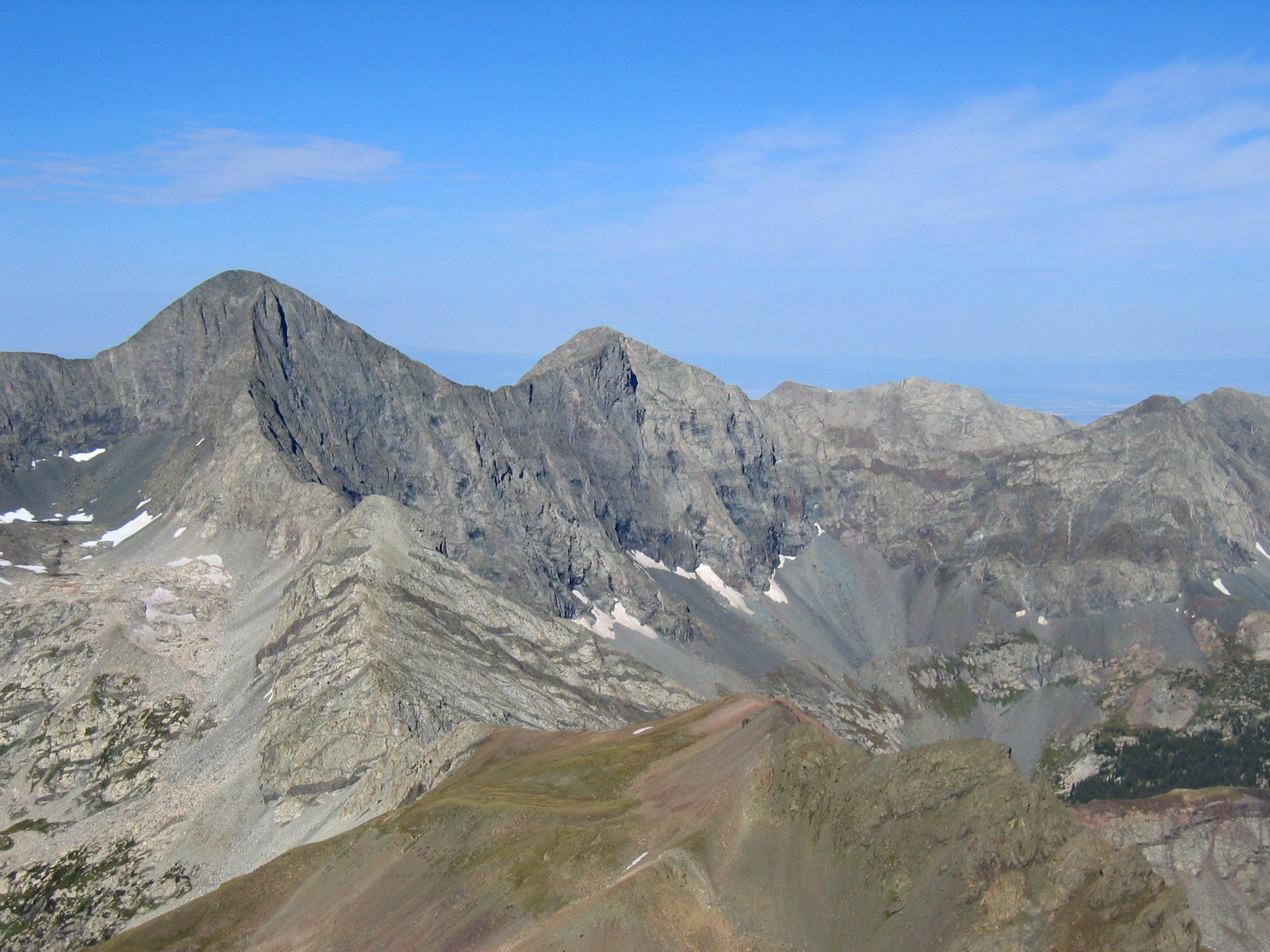
3. Mount Blanca straddling Alamosa and Costilla counties

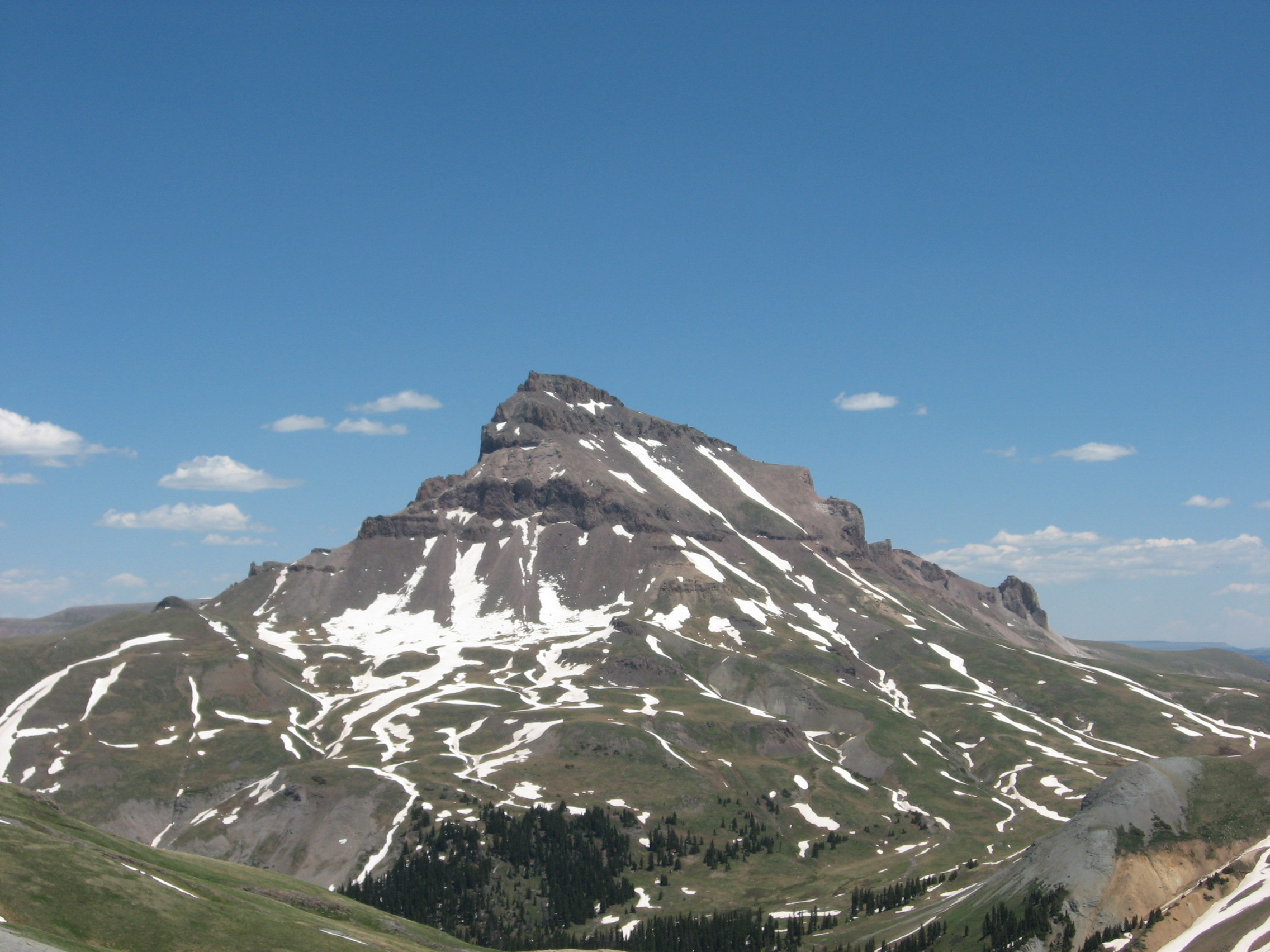
6. Uncompahgre Peak in Hinsdale County

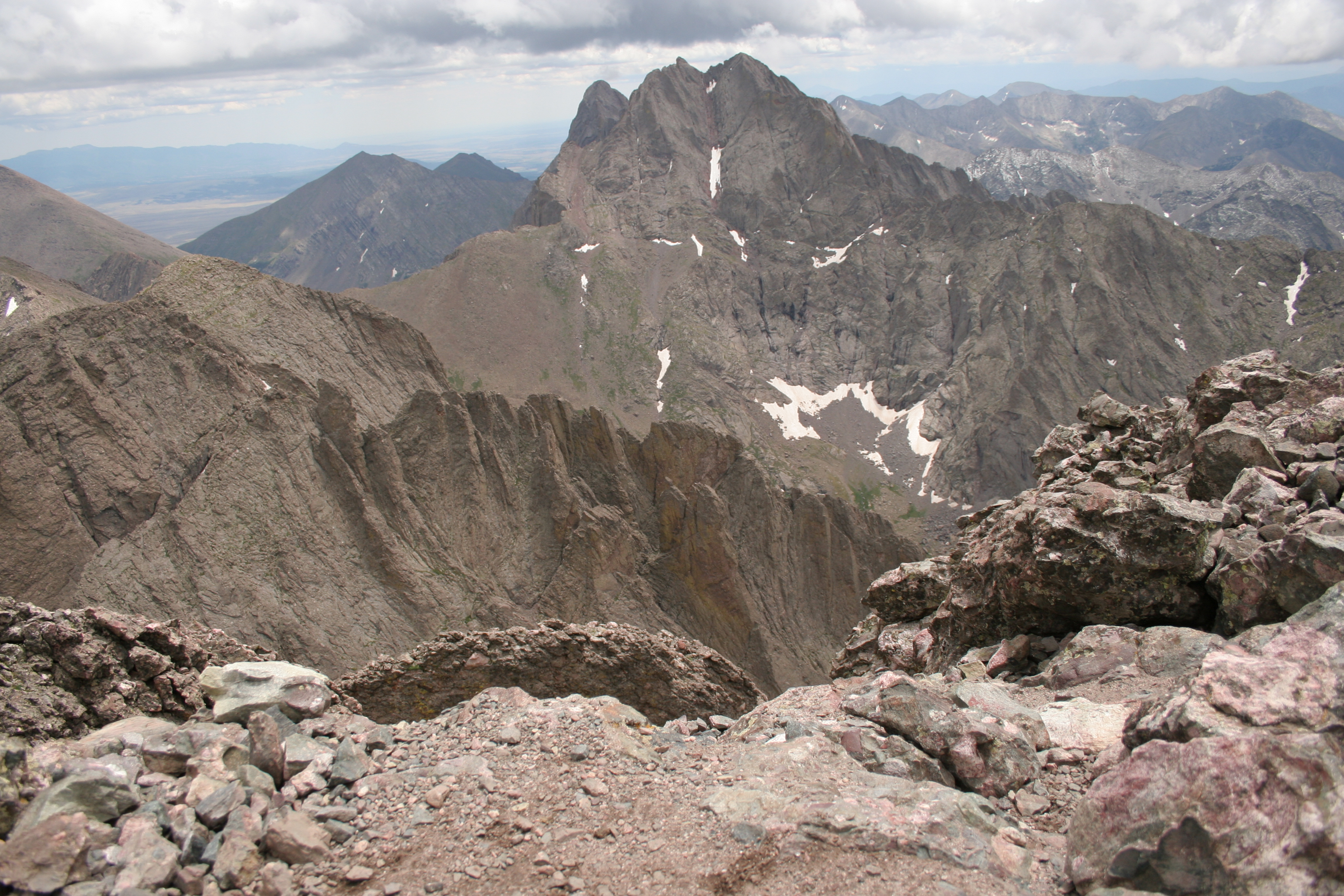
7. Crestone Peak in Saguache County

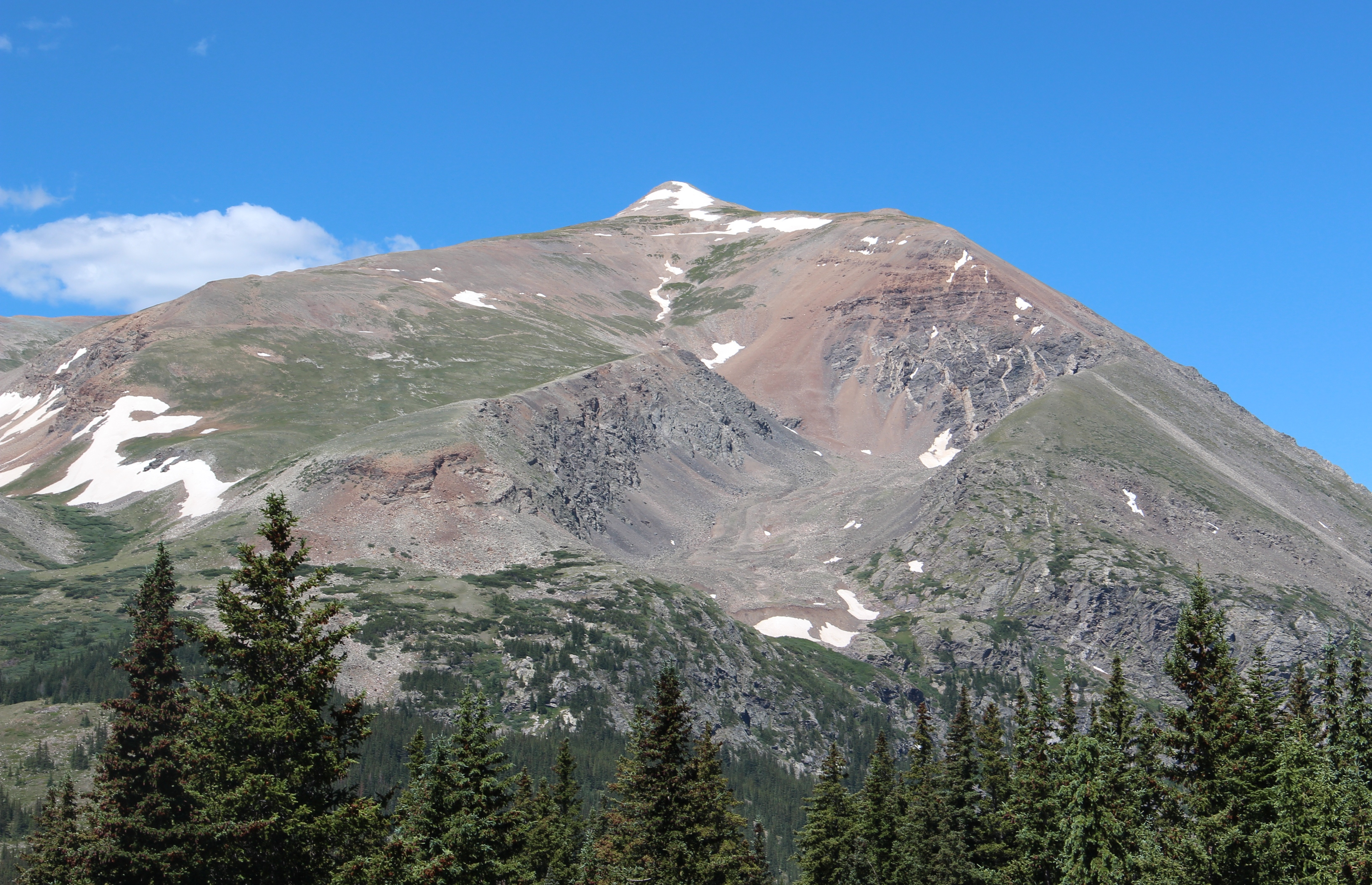
8. Mount Lincoln in Park County

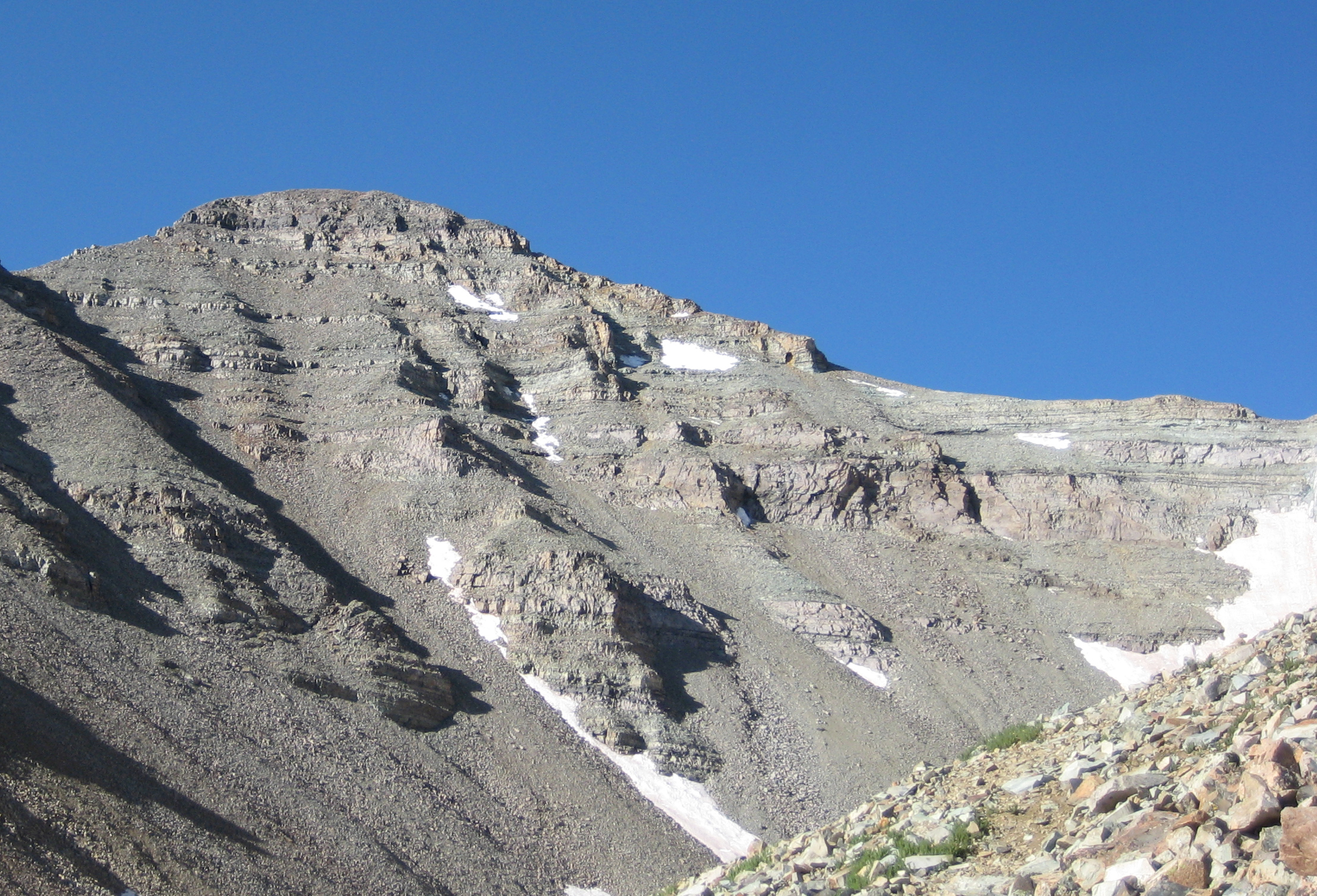
9. Castle Peak straddling Pitkin and Gunnison counties

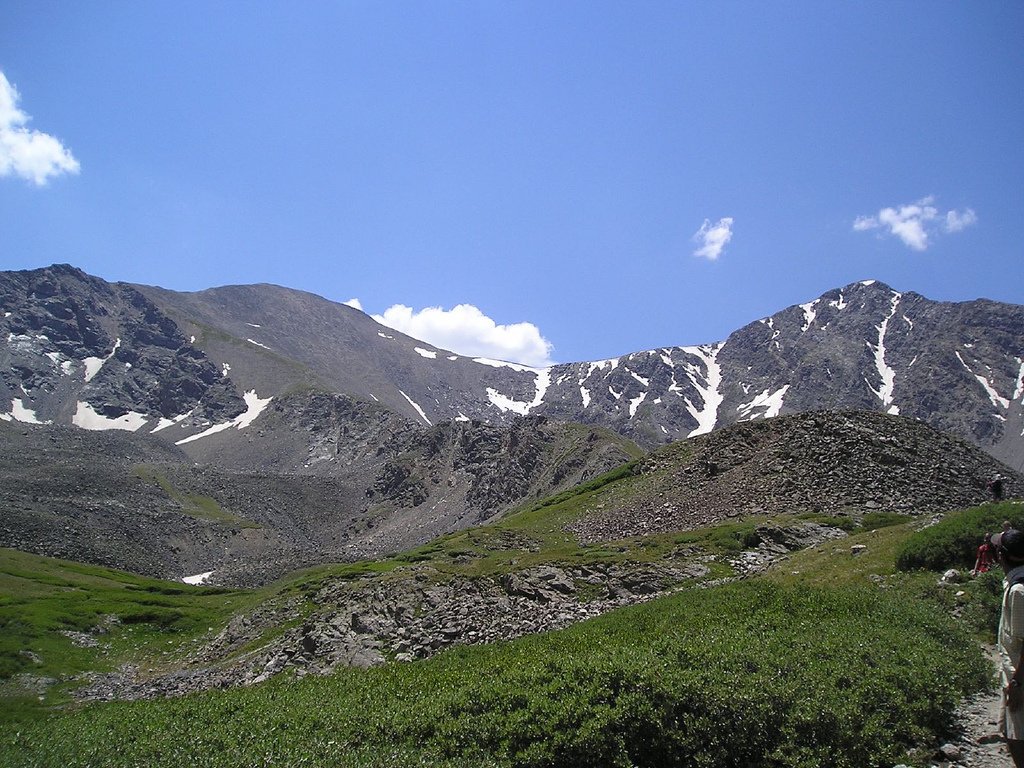
11. Grays Peak straddling Summit and Clear Creek counties

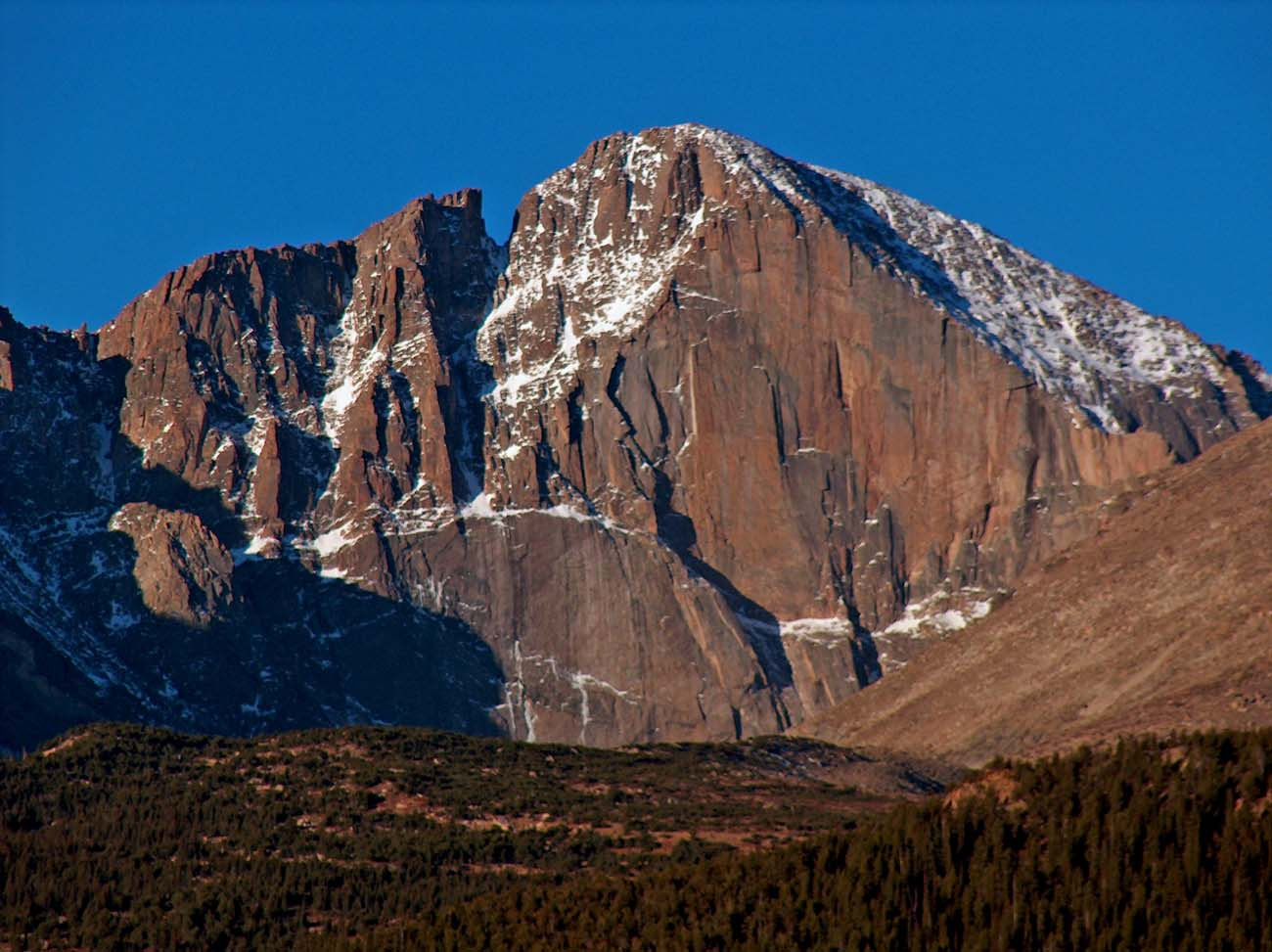
14. Longs Peak in Boulder County

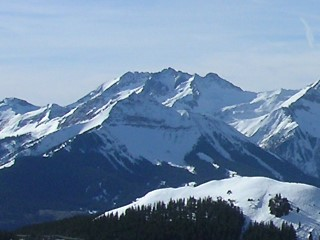
15. Mount Wilson in Dolores County

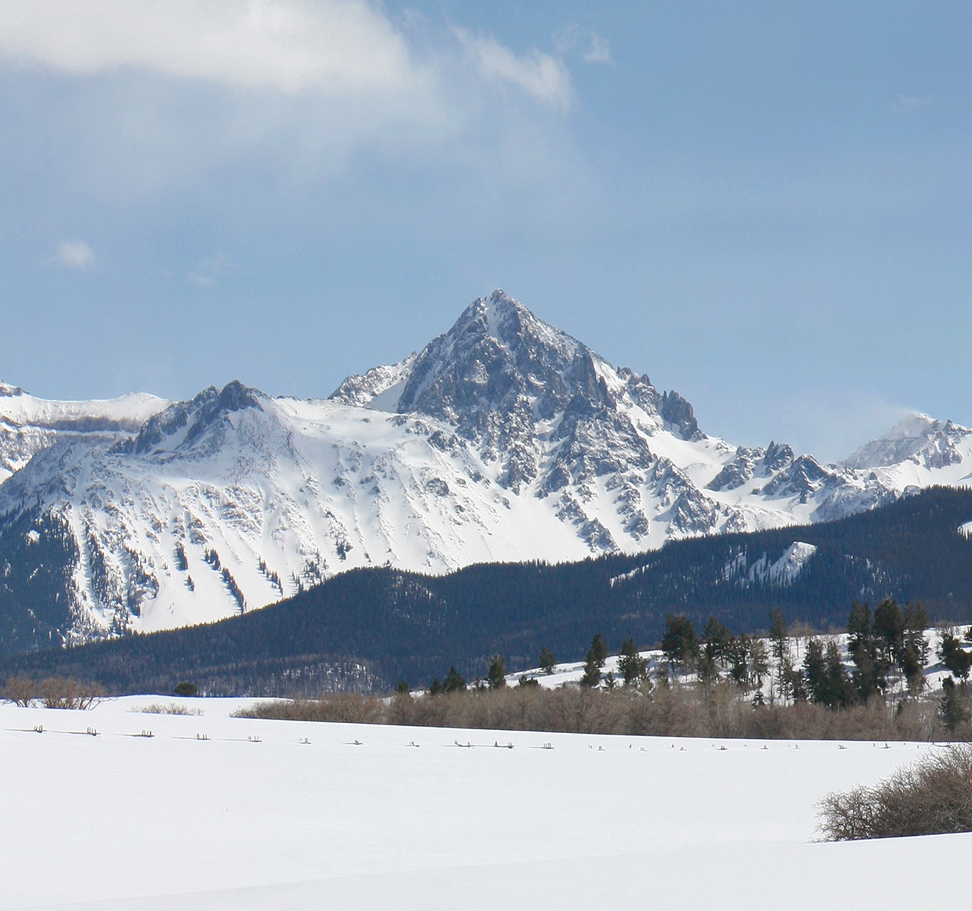
16. Mount Sneffels in Ouray County

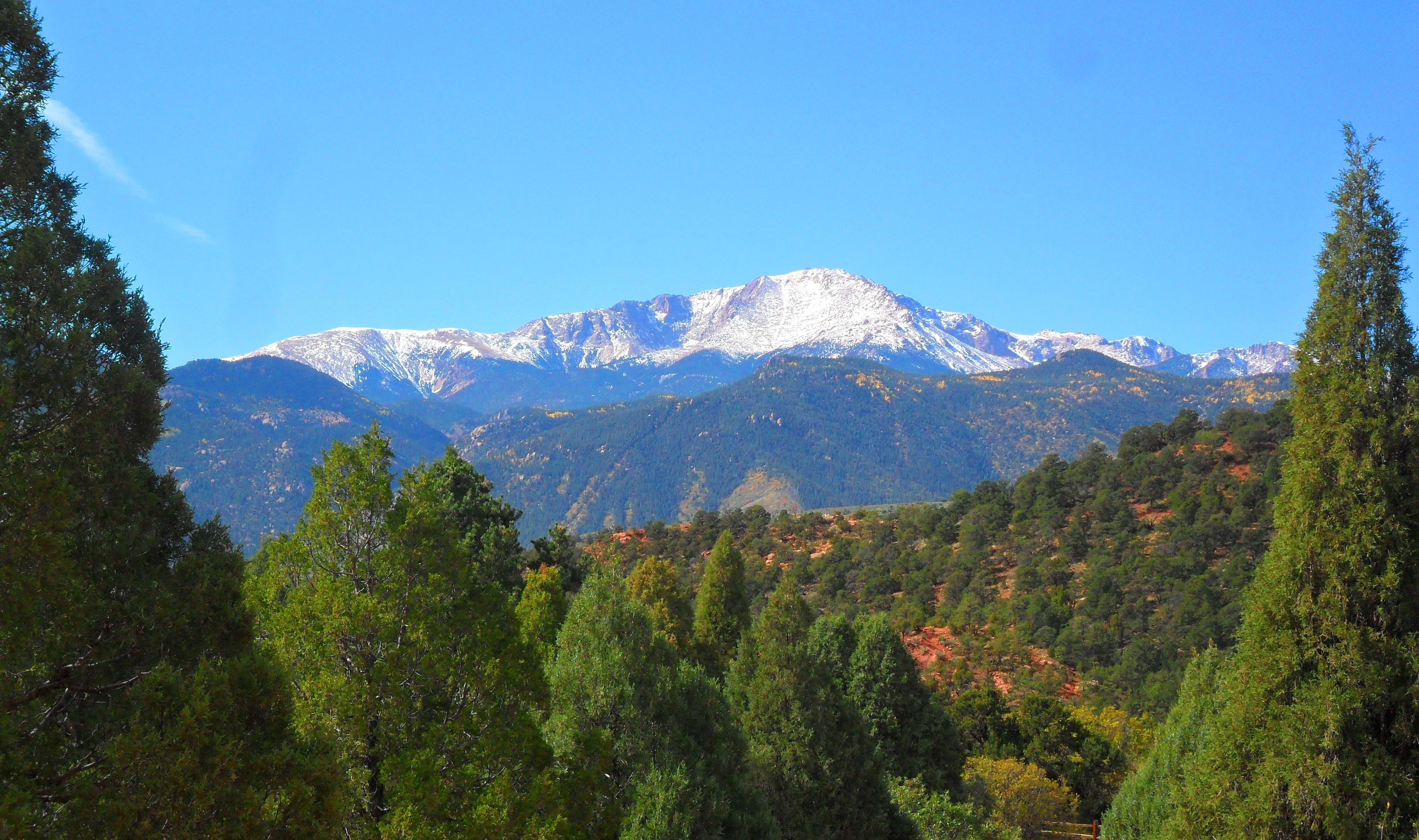
17. Pikes Peak in El Paso County

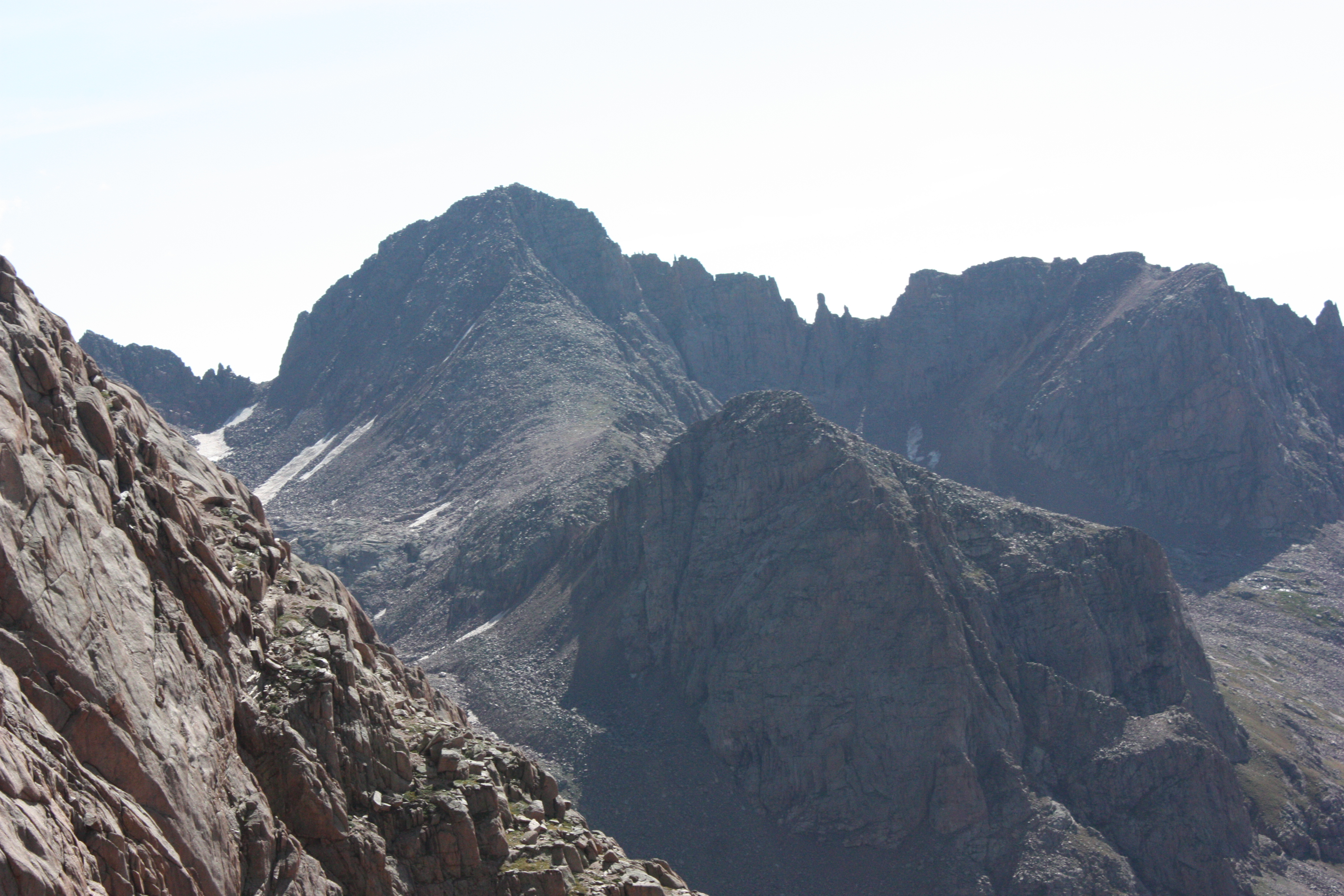
18. Windom Peak in La Plata County

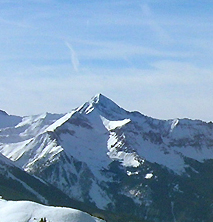
19. Wilson Peak in San Miguel County

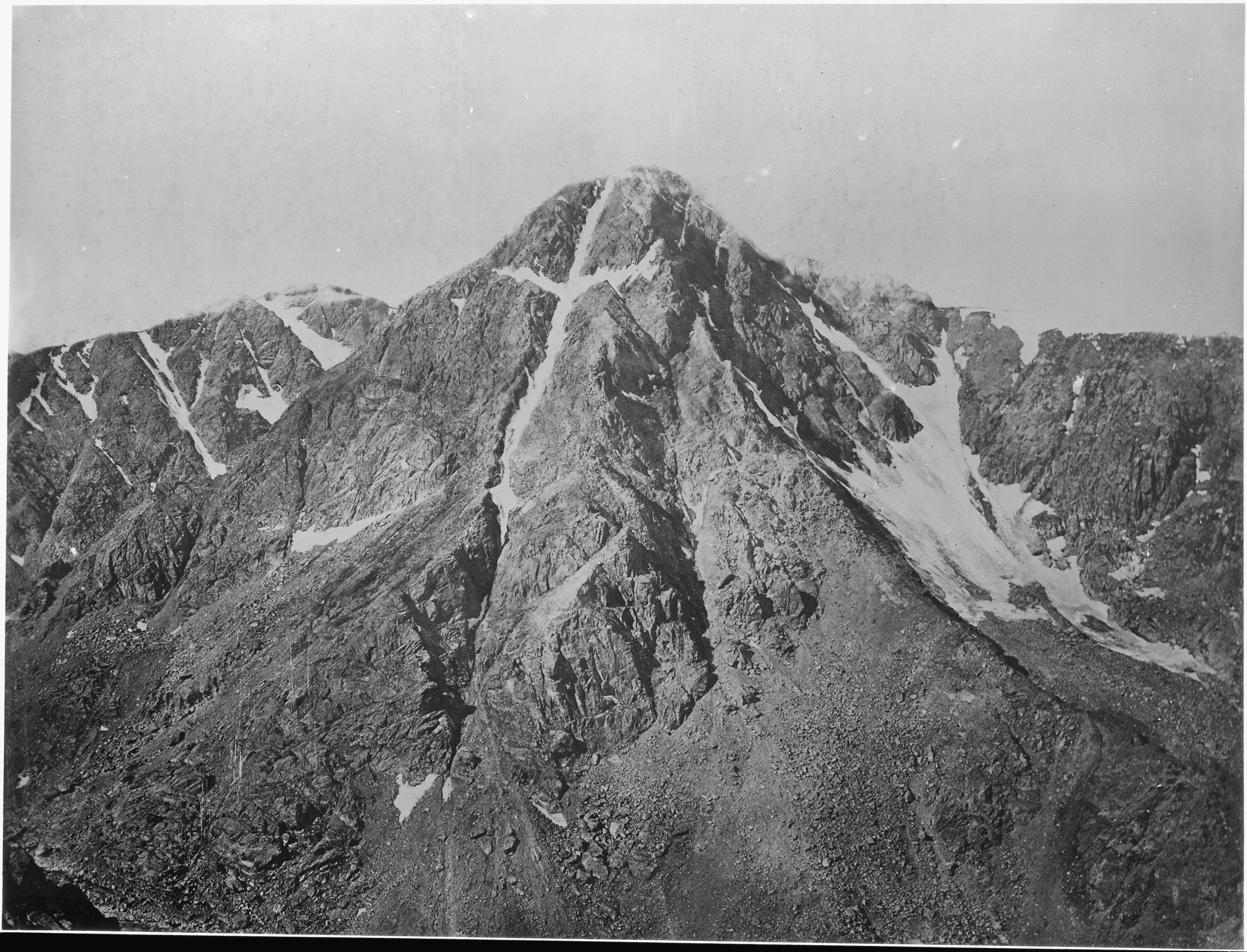
20. Mount of the Holy Cross in Eagle County

== See also ==
- Bibliography of Colorado
- Geography of Colorado
- History of Colorado
- Index of Colorado-related articles
- List of Colorado-related lists
  - List of counties in Colorado
    - List of Colorado counties by per capita income
    - List of Colorado counties by population
    - List of Colorado counties by socioeconomic factors
    - List of Colorado counties by statistical area
    - List of Colorado municipalities by county
    - List of Colorado populated places by county
    - List of county courthouses in Colorado
    - List of county seats in Colorado
  - List of mountain peaks of Colorado
    - List of mountains in Colorado
- Outline of Colorado
