= Conejos Peak =

Mountain in Colorado, United States

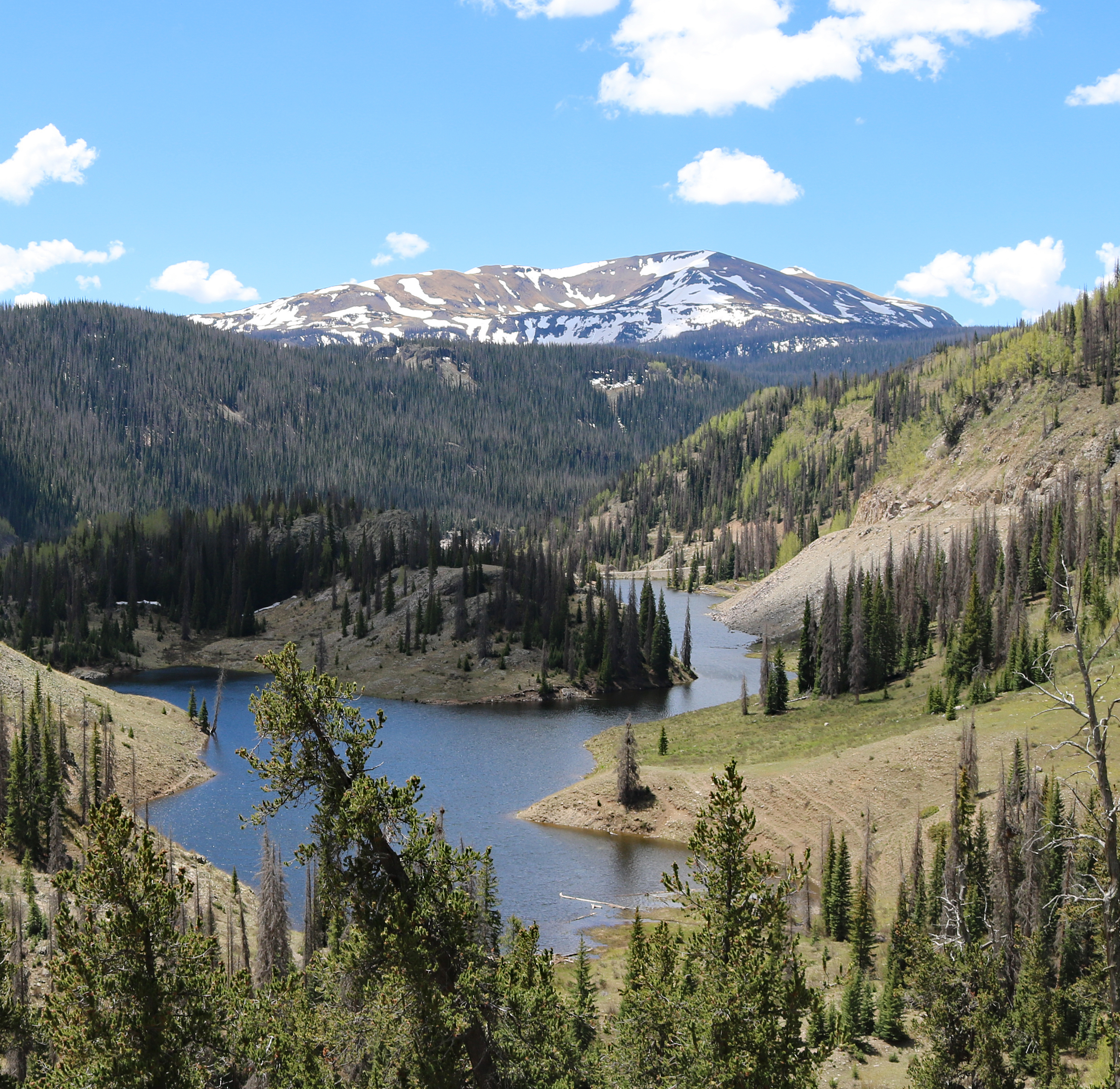
- The peak viewed from a point above Mix Lake

Highest point
- Elevation: 13,179 ft (4,017 m)
- Prominence: 1,912 ft (583 m)
- Isolation: 8.15 mi (13.12 km)
- Listing: North America highest peaks 116th; US highest major peaks 96th; Colorado highest major peak 53rd; Colorado county high points 30th
- Coordinates: 37°17′19″N 106°34′15″W

Geography
- Location within Colorado
- Location: High point of Conejos County, Colorado, United States
- Parent range: San Juan Mountains
- Topo map(s): USGS 7.5' topographic map Platoro, Colorado

Climbing
- Easiest route: Hike

Conejos Peak is a high and prominent mountain summit in the southern San Juan Mountains of the Rocky Mountains of North America. The 13,179-foot (4,017 m) thirteener is located in the South San Juan Wilderness of Rio Grande National Forest, 19.6 miles (31.6 km) north-northwest (bearing 340°) of Cumbres Pass in Conejos County, Colorado, United States. The summit of Conejos Peak is the highest point in Conejos County.

== See also ==
- List of mountain peaks of Colorado
- List of Colorado county high points
