= Buffalo Peak =

Mountain in Colorado, United States

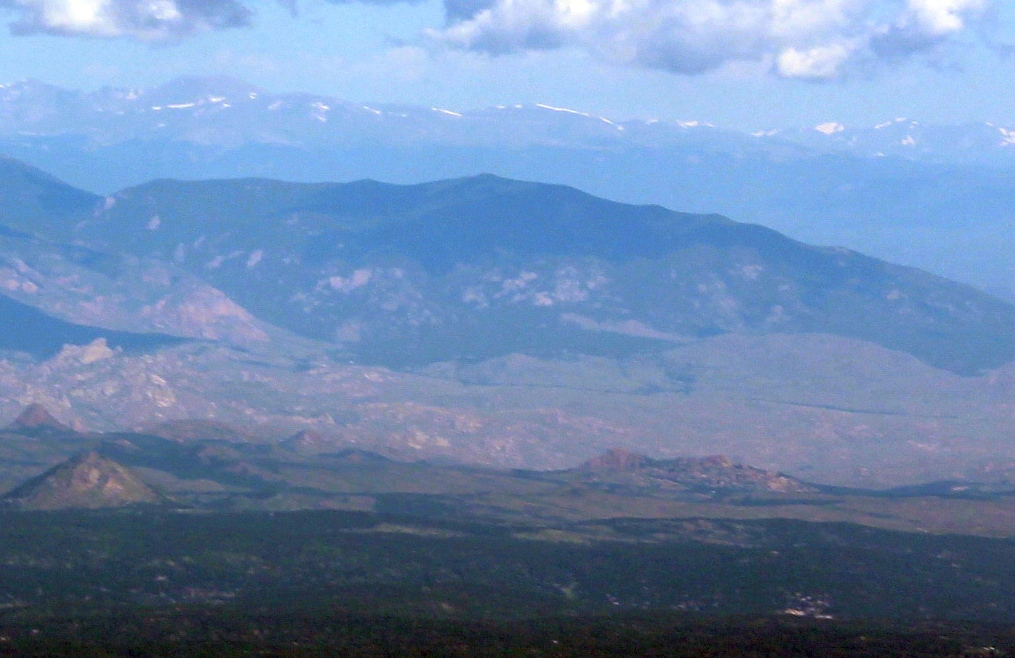
- Buffalo Peak viewed from Pikes Peak

Highest point
- Elevation: 11,594 ft (3,534 m)
- Prominence: 929 ft (283 m)
- Isolation: 4.28 mi (6.89 km)
- Listing: Colorado county high points 38th
- Coordinates: 39°16′32″N 105°22′05″W

Geography
- Location within Colorado
- Location: High point of Jefferson County, Colorado, United States
- Parent range: Front Range, Kenosha Mountains
- Topo map(s): USGS 7.5' topographic map Green Mountain, Colorado

Buffalo Peak is a mountain summit in the Kenosha Mountains range of the Rocky Mountains of North America. The 11,594-foot (3,534 m) peak is located in the Lost Creek Wilderness of Pike National Forest, 7.7 miles (12.4 km) west by north (bearing 280°) of the community of Deckers, Colorado, United States. Buffalo Peak is the highest point in Jefferson County, Colorado.

== Historical names ==
- Buffalo Peak - 1906
- Freemans Peak

== See also ==
- List of mountain peaks of Colorado
  - List of Colorado county high points
