= Mount Zirkel Wilderness =

U.S. Wilderness Area in northwest Colorado

- IUCN category Ib (wilderness area)
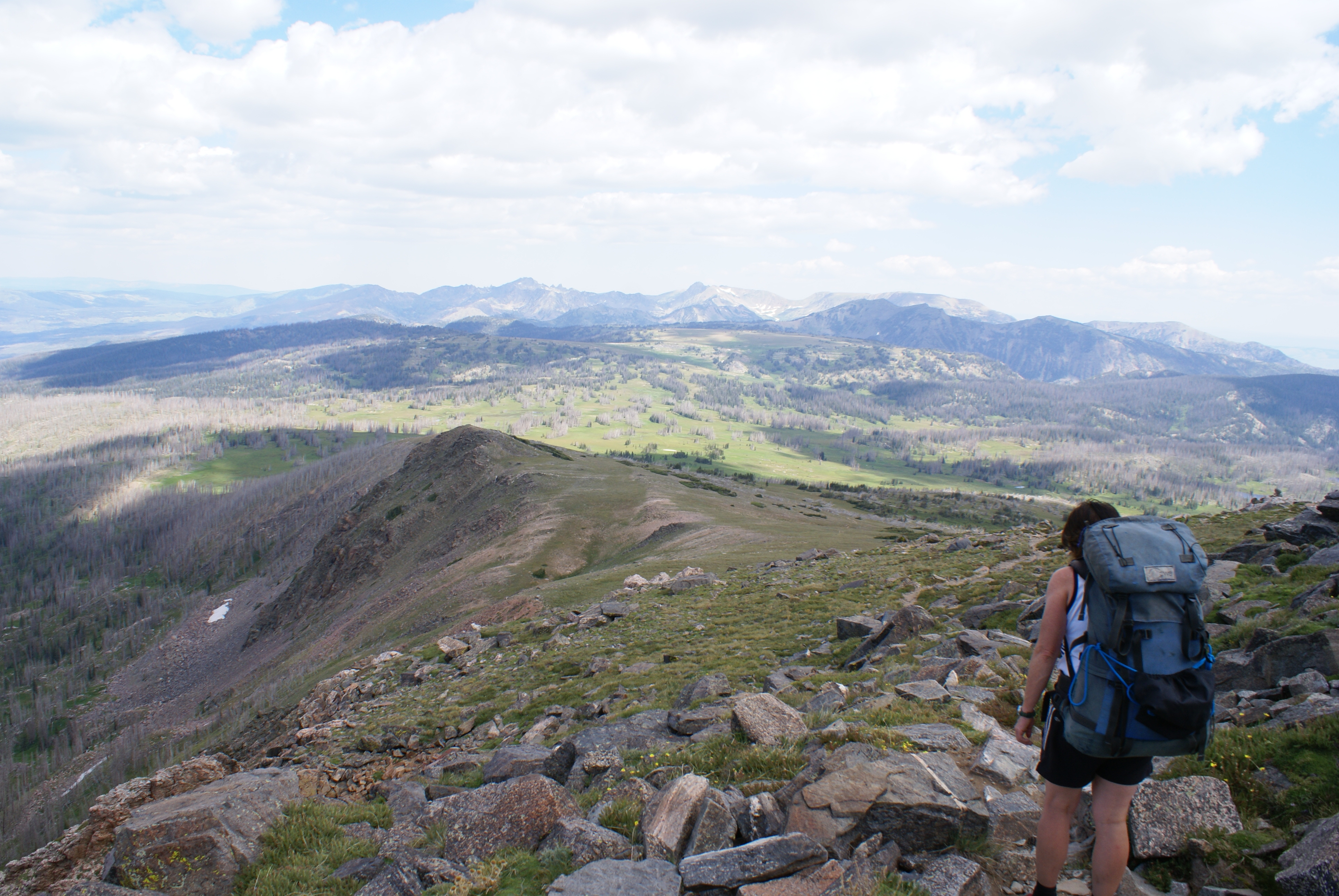
- A backpacker in Mt. Zirkel Wilderness. Ribbon Forests can be seen in the background.

- Location within the United States
- Location: Jackson / Routt counties, Colorado, USA
- Nearest city: Steamboat Springs, CO
- Coordinates: 40°44′53″N 106°41′42″W
- Area: 159,935 acres (647.23 km^{2})
- Established: January 1, 1980
- Governing body: U.S. Forest Service

Mount Zirkel Wilderness is located in Routt National Forest in northwestern Colorado. The closest city is Steamboat Springs, Colorado. The Wilderness is named after Mount Zirkel, the highest peak in the range at 12,182 feet (3,713 m), which itself is named after German geologist Ferdinand Zirkel. The lowest elevation in the Wilderness is about 7,500 ft (2,300 m). Mount Zirkel Wilderness has a total area of 159,935 acres (64,723 ha) (250 sq. miles). Some sources give the size of the Wilderness as 160,648 acres (65,012 ha). Hiking and fishing are popular activities for visitors.

The Mount Zirkel Wilderness was created in 1964 and has been expanded twice. A wilderness area is defined by law as "an area of undeveloped Federal land retaining its primeval character and influence, without permanent improvements or human habitation, which is protected and managed so as to preserve its natural conditions". All mechanized equipment, including drones, is prohibited in wilderness areas.

== Description ==
Mount Zirkel straddles the Continental Divide in the Park Range for about 28 miles (45 km) from Buffalo Pass to near the border of Wyoming. Fifteen peaks in the Wilderness exceed 12,000 ft (3,700 m) in elevation. The higher mountains of the Wilderness rise above timberline which is about 10,500 ft (3,200 m) elevation. Below the alpine tundra found above timberline are meadows, and spruce/fir and lodgepole pine forests. Seventy lakes dot the area and about 150 miles (240 km) of hiking trails reach from the borders of the Wilderness to the highest peaks. Some areas within the Wilderness display bedrock composed of metamorphic schists with large garnet crystals. About 40 miles (64 km) of the Continental Divide Trail passes through or near the Wilderness.

The small streams within the Wilderness and many of the lakes have populations of trout. Sport fishing is popular. The endangered Greenback cutthroat trout was stocked in many of the lakes on the eastern side of the Wilderness in 2003 and the vulnerable Colorado River cutthroat trout was stocked on the western side of the wilderness in 1993 and 1995. Non-native Brook and Rainbow trout have been introduced. The headwaters of the Elk, Encampment and North Platte Rivers are in the Wilderness. Wildlife in the Wilderness includes black bear, mountain lion, moose, elk, mule deer, and mountain sheep. Hunting is permitted.

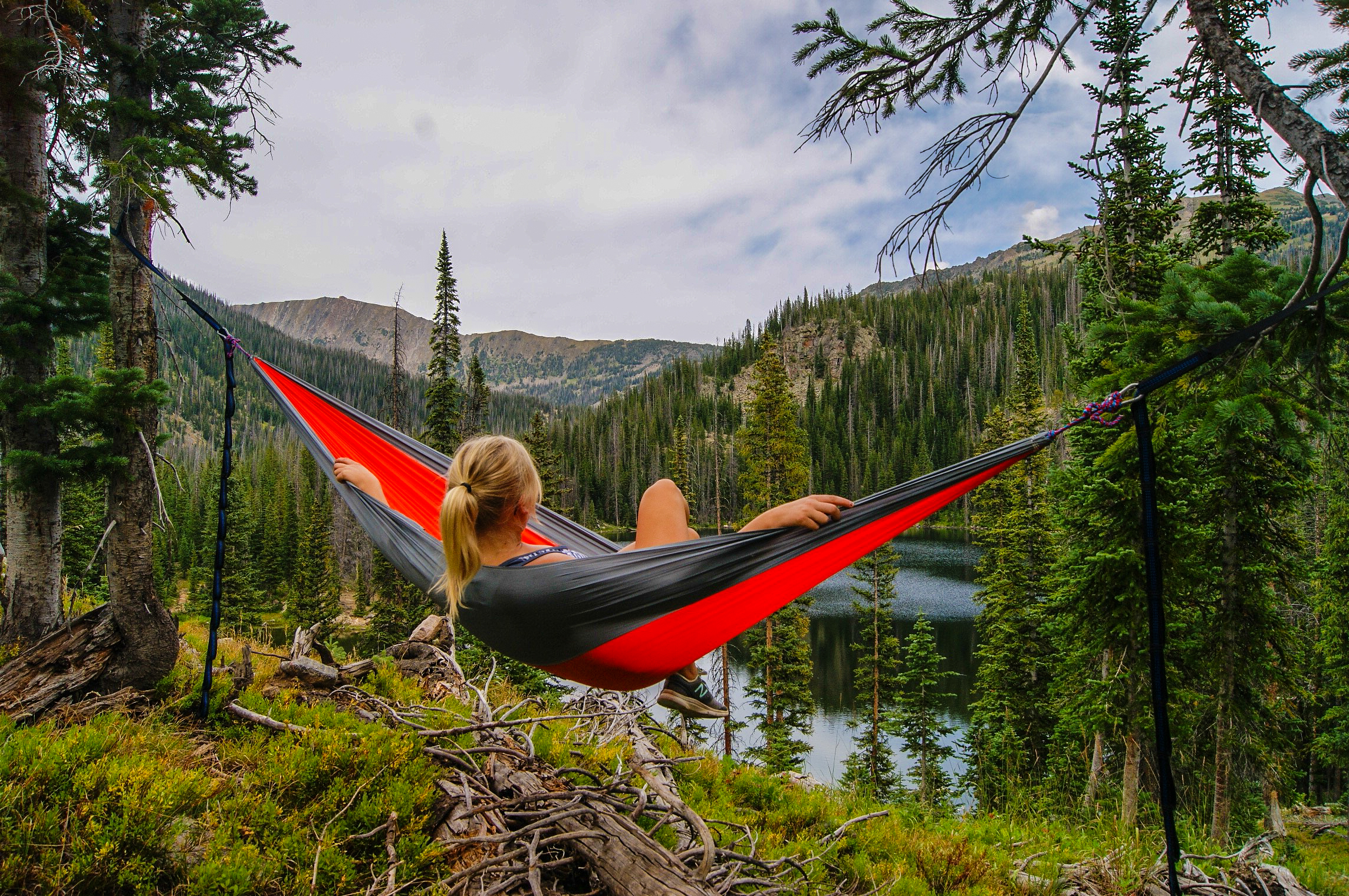
Overlooking Three Island Lake in Mount Zirkel Wilderness.

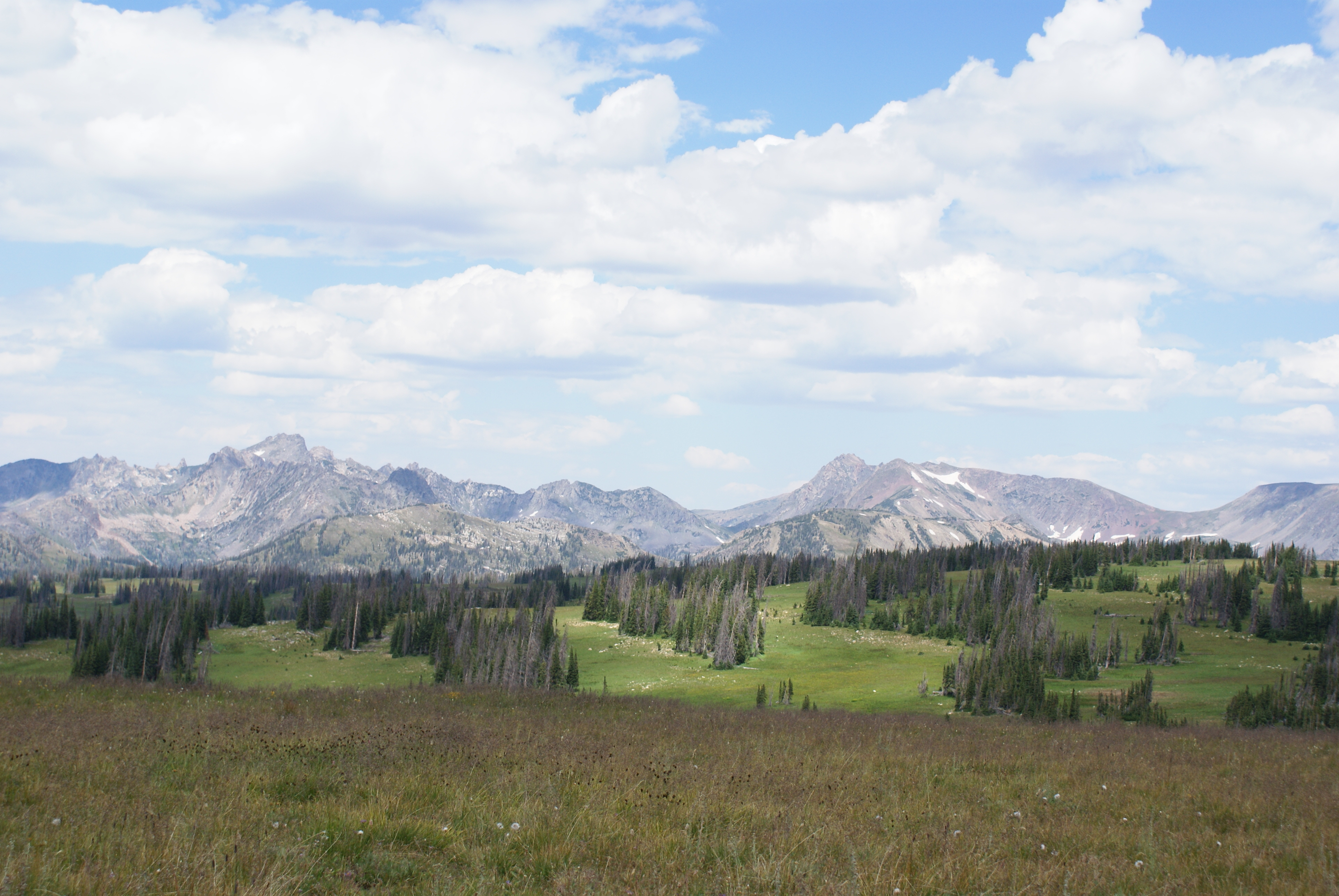
Mt. Zirkel and Big Agnes Mountains from the south with ribbon forests in foreground.

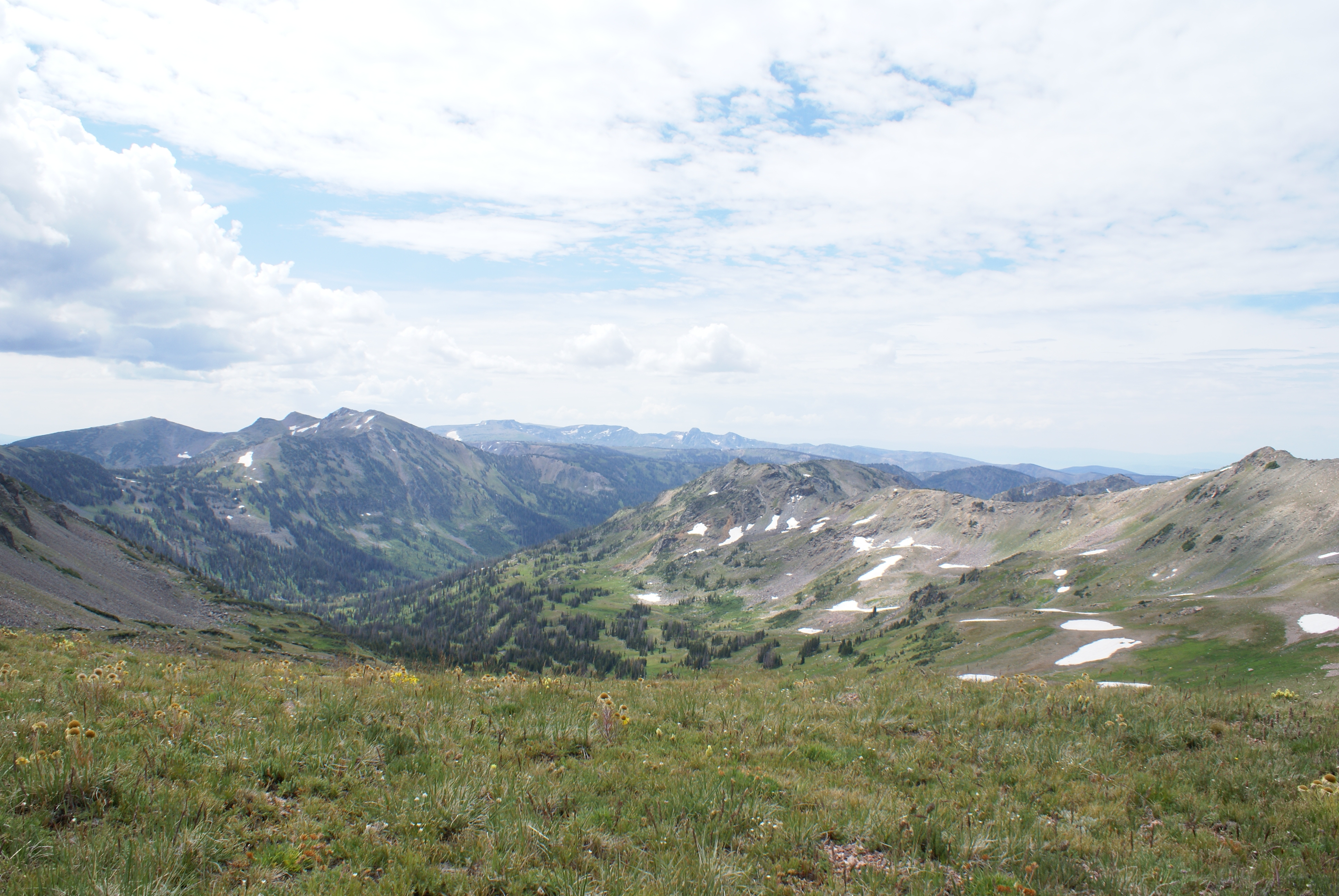
The view south from Red Dirt Pass. Snow persists at high elevations into August.

Buffalo Pass, at the southern edge of the Mount Zirkel Wilderness, receives more precipitation annually than any other weather station in Colorado. The Buffalo Pass weather station, 10,610 ft (3,230 m) in elevation, receives on average 58.3 in (1,480 mm) of precipipation every year. Much of the precipitation is in winter snowfall. Buffalo Pass also has the Colorado record for greatest snow depth. The snowpack reached a depth of more than 200 in (5,100 mm) in early May 2011. The heavy snowfall relates to another characteristic of the southern part of Mount Zirkel Wilderness: the existence of a rare habitat called a ribbon forest.

The ribbon forests consist of long, narrow bands of spruce and fir trees separated by treeless grassland. A ribbon forest forms when high winds and heavy snowfall combine. The first step in the formation of a ribbon forest is that trees colonize a favorable spot in a meadow. Upwind from the trees, high winds scour the area of winter snow and the resultant cold, bare earth prevents trees from growing. Downwind, the line of trees reduces the impact of the wind and snow piles up in the lee of the trees and that also prevents trees from growing as the snow lasts into early summer. In the Buffalo Pass area, the ribbons of forest usually run in a north-south direction. In a study area near Buffalo Pass ribbon forests covered 32.7 percent of the land. The ribbons of forest had a mean length of 42 m (138 ft) and a mean width of 11.2 m (37 ft).

== 1997 blowdown ==
On October 25, 1997, a hurricane-force wind caused a blowdown of a mature forest on the western slope of the Continental Divide. The blowdown destroyed 13,000 acres (5,300 ha) of old growth forest in an area of measuring twenty miles from north to south and several miles from east to west. Most of the blowdown was within the Mount Zirkel Wilderness. It was the worst blowdown ever recorded in the Rocky Mountain region. The blowdown triggered an infestation of spruce beetles which spread from downed trees to standing trees in 2000 and 2001, killing many trees in the Mr. Zirkel forests.
