= Mount Zirkel =

Mountain in the state of Colorado

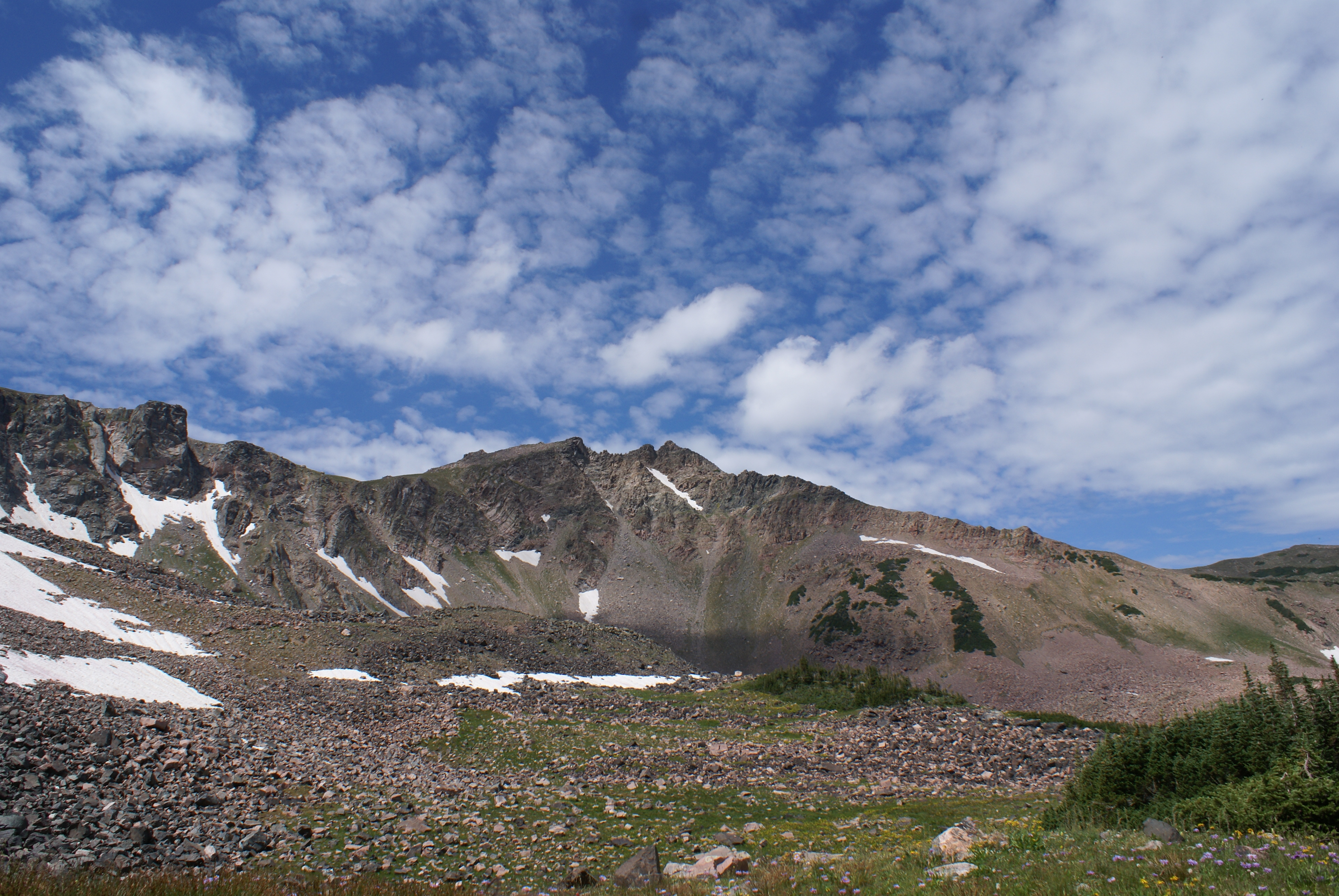
- View of West face of Mt. Zirkel in Mt. Zirkel Wilderness in northern Colorado, taken from Fryingpan Basin

Highest point
- Elevation: 12,185 ft (3,714 m)
- Prominence: 3,470 ft (1,058 m)
- Isolation: 37.66 mi (60.61 km)
- Listing: Colorado county high points 36th
- Coordinates: 40°49′52″N 106°39′47″W

Naming
- Etymology: Ferdinand Zirkel

Geography
- Location within Colorado
- Location: Jackson County and the high point of Routt County, Colorado, U.S.
- Parent range: Highest summit of the Park Range
- Topo map(s): USGS 7.5' topographic map Mount Zirkel, Colorado

Climbing
- Easiest route: hike

Mount Zirkel is the highest summit of the Park Range of the Rocky Mountains of North America. The prominent 12,185-foot (3,714 m) peak is located in the Mount Zirkel Wilderness of Routt National Forest, 25.9 miles (41.7 km) north-northeast (bearing 19°) of the City of Steamboat Springs, Colorado, United States, on the Continental Divide between Jackson and Routt counties. Mount Zirkel was named in honor of German geologist Ferdinand Zirkel.

== Climate ==
Climate data for Mount Zirkel 40.8196 N, 106.6426 W, Elevation: 11,821 ft (3,603 m) (1991–2020 normals)
Month	Jan	Feb	Mar	Apr	May	Jun	Jul	Aug	Sep	Oct	Nov	Dec	Year
Mean daily maximum °F (°C)	23.6 (−4.7)	23.8 (−4.6)	29.9 (−1.2)	35.5 (1.9)	44.7 (7.1)	56.3 (13.5)	63.5 (17.5)	61.6 (16.4)	54.0 (12.2)	41.7 (5.4)	30.2 (−1.0)	23.3 (−4.8)	40.7 (4.8)
Daily mean °F (°C)	13.8 (−10.1)	13.6 (−10.2)	18.8 (−7.3)	24.1 (−4.4)	33.2 (0.7)	44.1 (6.7)	51.4 (10.8)	49.4 (9.7)	42.1 (5.6)	31.1 (−0.5)	20.6 (−6.3)	13.8 (−10.1)	29.7 (−1.3)
Mean daily minimum °F (°C)	3.9 (−15.6)	3.3 (−15.9)	7.7 (−13.5)	12.7 (−10.7)	21.8 (−5.7)	31.9 (−0.1)	39.3 (4.1)	37.2 (2.9)	30.3 (−0.9)	20.6 (−6.3)	11.0 (−11.7)	4.2 (−15.4)	18.7 (−7.4)
Average precipitation inches (mm)	9.61 (244)	8.94 (227)	6.66 (169)	7.97 (202)	5.93 (151)	3.16 (80)	1.68 (43)	2.28 (58)	3.45 (88)	6.05 (154)	8.10 (206)	8.84 (225)	72.67 (1,847)
Source: PRISM Climate Group

== See also ==
- List of mountain peaks of Colorado
  - List of the most prominent summits of Colorado
  - List of Colorado county high points
