= Summit Peak =

Mountain in Colorado, United States

- Location within Colorado

Highest point
- Elevation: 13,307 ft (4,056 m)
- Prominence: 2,760 ft (841 m)
- Isolation: 39.56 mi (63.67 km)
- Listing: North America highest peaks: 106th; US highest major peaks: 87th; Colorado highest major peaks: 46th; Colorado county high points: 26th
- Coordinates: 37°21′02″N 106°41′49″W

Geography
- Location: Continental Divide at the high point of Archuleta County, Colorado, United States
- Parent range: San Juan Mountains
- Topo map(s): USGS 7.5' topographic map Weminuche Pass, Colorado

Climbing
- Easiest route: hike

Summit Peak, elevation 13,307 ft (4,056 m), sits on the Continental Divide in southern Colorado. The mountain is the highest point in the South San Juan Wilderness.

== See also ==
- List of mountain peaks of North America
  - List of mountain peaks of the United States
    - List of mountain peaks of Colorado
      - List of Colorado county high points
