= Clark Peak (Medicine Bow Mountains) =

Mountain in Colorado, United States

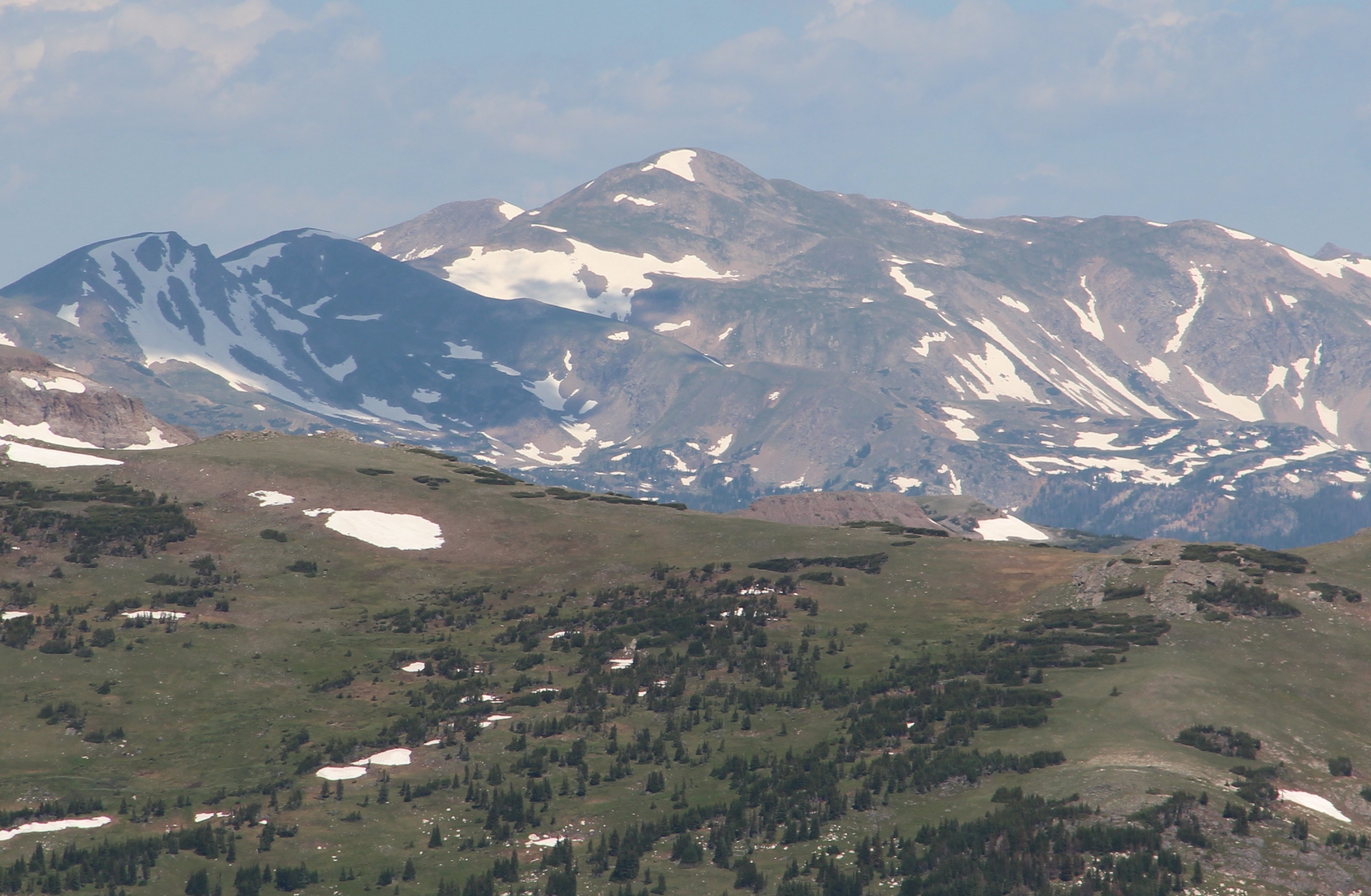
- Clark Peak viewed from Rocky Mountain National Park

Highest point
- Elevation: 12,960 ft (3,950 m)
- Prominence: 2,771 ft (845 m)
- Isolation: 16.40 mi (26.39 km)
- Listing: Colorado county high points 33rd
- Coordinates: 40°36′25″N 105°55′48″W

Geography
- Location within Colorado
- Location: Larimer County and the high point of Jackson County, Colorado, United States
- Parent range: Highest summit of the Medicine Bow Mountains
- Topo map(s): USGS 7.5' topographic map Clark Peak, Colorado

Clark Peak is the highest summit of the Medicine Bow Mountains range of the Rocky Mountains of North America. The prominent 12,960-foot (3,950 m) peak is located in the Rawah Wilderness of Routt National Forest, 6.3 miles (10.1 km) north-northwest (bearing 342°) of Cameron Pass, Colorado, United States, on the drainage divide between Jackson and Larimer counties. Clark Peak is the highest point of Jackson County and the entire drainage basin of the North Platte River.

== Climate ==
Climate data for Clark Peak 40.6102 N, 105.9209 W, Elevation: 12,313 ft (3,753 m) (1991–2020 normals)
Month	Jan	Feb	Mar	Apr	May	Jun	Jul	Aug	Sep	Oct	Nov	Dec	Year
Mean daily maximum °F (°C)	21.5 (−5.8)	21.2 (−6.0)	27.7 (−2.4)	34.3 (1.3)	43.3 (6.3)	54.3 (12.4)	60.9 (16.1)	58.8 (14.9)	51.9 (11.1)	39.9 (4.4)	28.3 (−2.1)	21.5 (−5.8)	38.6 (3.7)
Daily mean °F (°C)	12.0 (−11.1)	11.5 (−11.4)	17.2 (−8.2)	22.9 (−5.1)	31.8 (−0.1)	42.3 (5.7)	49.2 (9.6)	47.3 (8.5)	40.5 (4.7)	29.5 (−1.4)	19.2 (−7.1)	12.2 (−11.0)	28.0 (−2.2)
Mean daily minimum °F (°C)	2.4 (−16.4)	1.8 (−16.8)	6.7 (−14.1)	11.5 (−11.4)	20.3 (−6.5)	30.3 (−0.9)	37.4 (3.0)	35.8 (2.1)	29.0 (−1.7)	19.1 (−7.2)	10.0 (−12.2)	2.8 (−16.2)	17.3 (−8.2)
Average precipitation inches (mm)	5.01 (127)	4.99 (127)	5.20 (132)	6.29 (160)	5.24 (133)	2.42 (61)	2.38 (60)	2.56 (65)	3.02 (77)	4.27 (108)	4.92 (125)	4.59 (117)	50.89 (1,292)
Source: PRISM Climate Group

== See also ==
- List of mountain peaks of Colorado
  - List of the most prominent summits of Colorado
  - List of Colorado county high points
