= Pintada Mountain =

Mountain in Colorado, United States

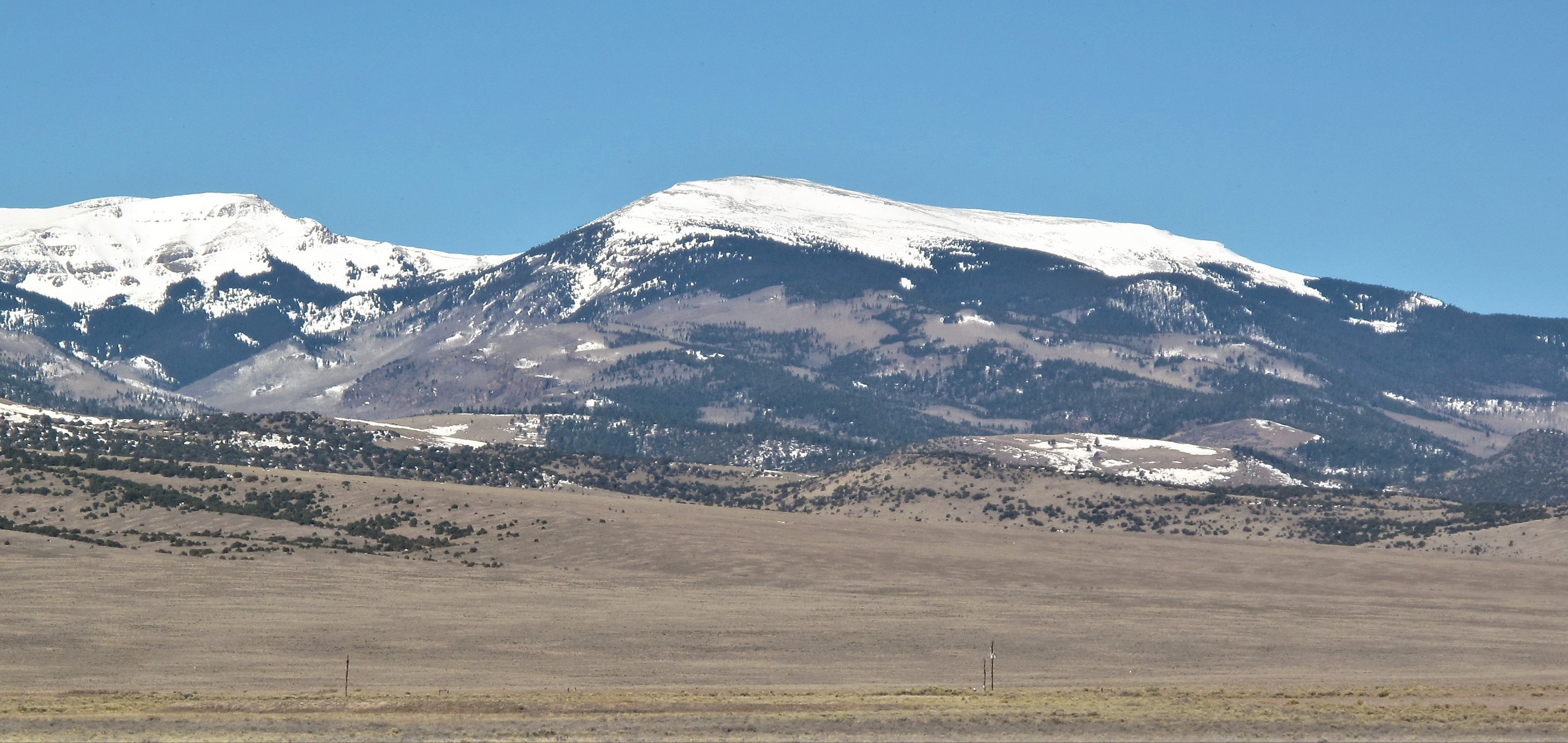
- East aspect, centered (Bennett Peak to left)

Highest point
- Elevation: 12,840 ft (3,914 m)
- Prominence: 629 ft (192 m)
- Parent peak: Bennett Peak (13,209 ft)
- Isolation: 1.98 mi (3.19 km)
- Coordinates: 37°29′49″N 106°24′09″W

Geography
- Location within Colorado Location within the United States
- Country: United States
- State: Colorado
- County: Rio Grande
- Protected area: Rio Grande National Forest
- Parent range: Rocky Mountains; San Juan Mountains
- Topo map: USGS Jasper

Climbing
- Easiest route: class 2 hiking

Pintada Mountain is a 12,840-foot (3,914 m) mountain summit in Rio Grande County, Colorado, United States.

== Description ==
Pintada Mountain is located 15 miles (24 km) southwest of the town of Monte Vista on land managed by Rio Grande National Forest. It is part of the San Juan Mountains which are a subrange of the Rocky Mountains. Pintada Mountain ranks as the second-highest peak in Rio Grande County, and is set two miles (3.2 km) northeast of line parent Bennett Peak which is the highest. Precipitation runoff from the mountain's slopes drains into Raton, Rock, and San Francisco creeks which flow to the San Luis Valley. Topographic relief is significant as the summit rises 1,640 feet (500 m) above Middle Fork San Francisco Creek in 0.8 miles (1.3 km). The mountain's toponym has been officially adopted by the United States Board on Geographic Names, and means "painted" or "mottled" in Spanish.

== Climate ==
According to the Köppen climate classification system, Pintada Mountain has an alpine subarctic climate with cold, snowy winters, and cool to warm summers. Due to its altitude, it receives precipitation all year, as snow in winter and as thunderstorms in summer, with a dry period in late spring.

== See also ==
- List of mountain peaks of Colorado
