= Bennett Peak =

Mountain in Colorado, United States

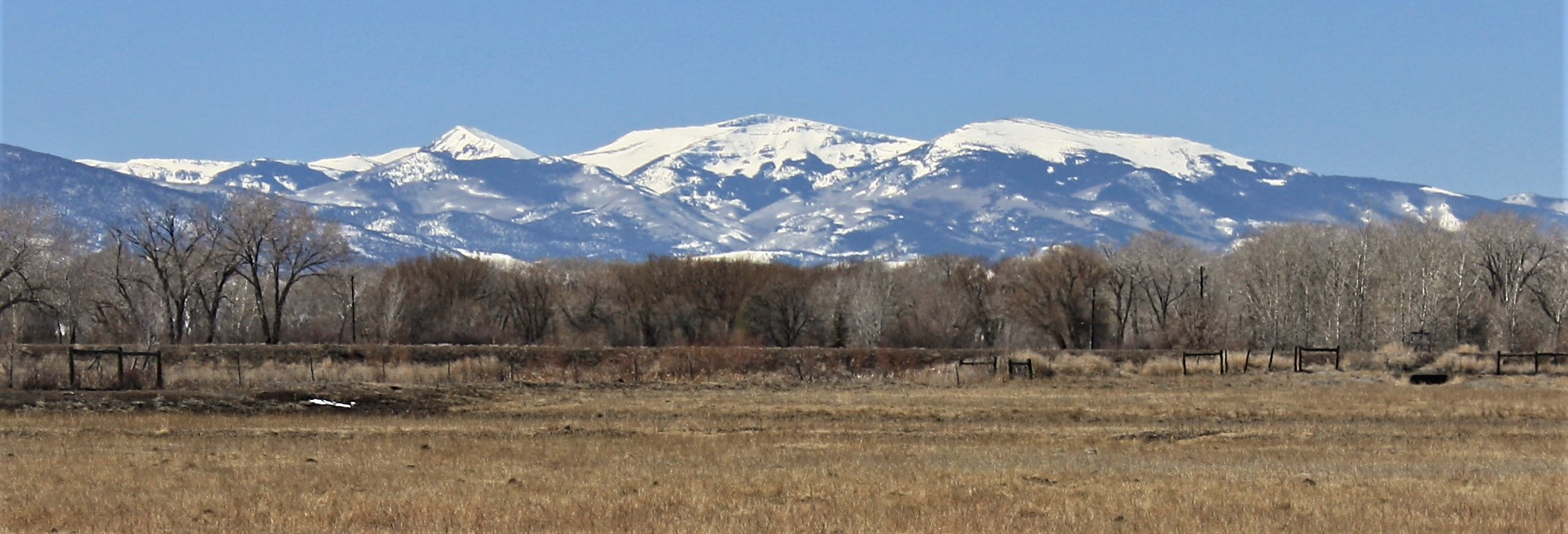
- East aspect

Highest point
- Elevation: 13,209 ft (4,026 m)
- Prominence: 1,743 ft (531 m)
- Isolation: 17.08 mi (27.49 km)
- Listing: North America highest peaks 113th; US highest major peaks 94th; Colorado highest major peak 52nd; Colorado county high points 29th
- Coordinates: 37°29′00″N 106°26′02″W

Geography
- Location within Colorado
- Location: High point of Rio Grande County, Colorado, United States
- Parent range: San Juan Mountains
- Topo map(s): USGS 7.5' topographic map Jasper, Colorado

Bennett Peak is a high and prominent mountain summit in the San Juan Mountains range of the Rocky Mountains System, in southwestern Colorado.

The 13,209-foot (4,026 m) thirteener is located in Rio Grande National Forest, 14.2 miles (22.8 km) south-southwest (bearing 198°) of the Town of Del Norte in Rio Grande County.

Bennett Peak is the highest point in Rio Grande County.

== Climate ==
Climate data for Bennett Peak 37.4841 N, 106.4318 W, Elevation: 12,995 ft (3,961 m) (1991–2020 normals)
Month	Jan	Feb	Mar	Apr	May	Jun	Jul	Aug	Sep	Oct	Nov	Dec	Year
Mean daily maximum °F (°C)	25.8 (−3.4)	25.7 (−3.5)	30.7 (−0.7)	35.6 (2.0)	43.6 (6.4)	54.6 (12.6)	59.6 (15.3)	57.4 (14.1)	51.7 (10.9)	42.1 (5.6)	32.6 (0.3)	25.9 (−3.4)	40.4 (4.7)
Daily mean °F (°C)	14.0 (−10.0)	13.7 (−10.2)	18.2 (−7.7)	23.0 (−5.0)	31.4 (−0.3)	41.6 (5.3)	46.5 (8.1)	45.0 (7.2)	39.4 (4.1)	30.2 (−1.0)	21.3 (−5.9)	14.6 (−9.7)	28.2 (−2.1)
Mean daily minimum °F (°C)	2.3 (−16.5)	1.8 (−16.8)	5.7 (−14.6)	10.4 (−12.0)	19.2 (−7.1)	28.5 (−1.9)	33.5 (0.8)	32.6 (0.3)	27.1 (−2.7)	18.2 (−7.7)	10.0 (−12.2)	3.2 (−16.0)	16.0 (−8.9)
Average precipitation inches (mm)	3.86 (98)	3.85 (98)	3.92 (100)	3.83 (97)	2.26 (57)	1.08 (27)	3.80 (97)	4.14 (105)	2.87 (73)	3.33 (85)	4.30 (109)	3.67 (93)	40.91 (1,039)
Source: PRISM Climate Group

== Historical names ==
- Bennett Mountain
- Bennett Peak

== See also ==
- List of mountain peaks of Colorado
- List of Colorado county high points
- Pintada Mountain
