= Ferdinand Zirkel =

German geologist and petrographer

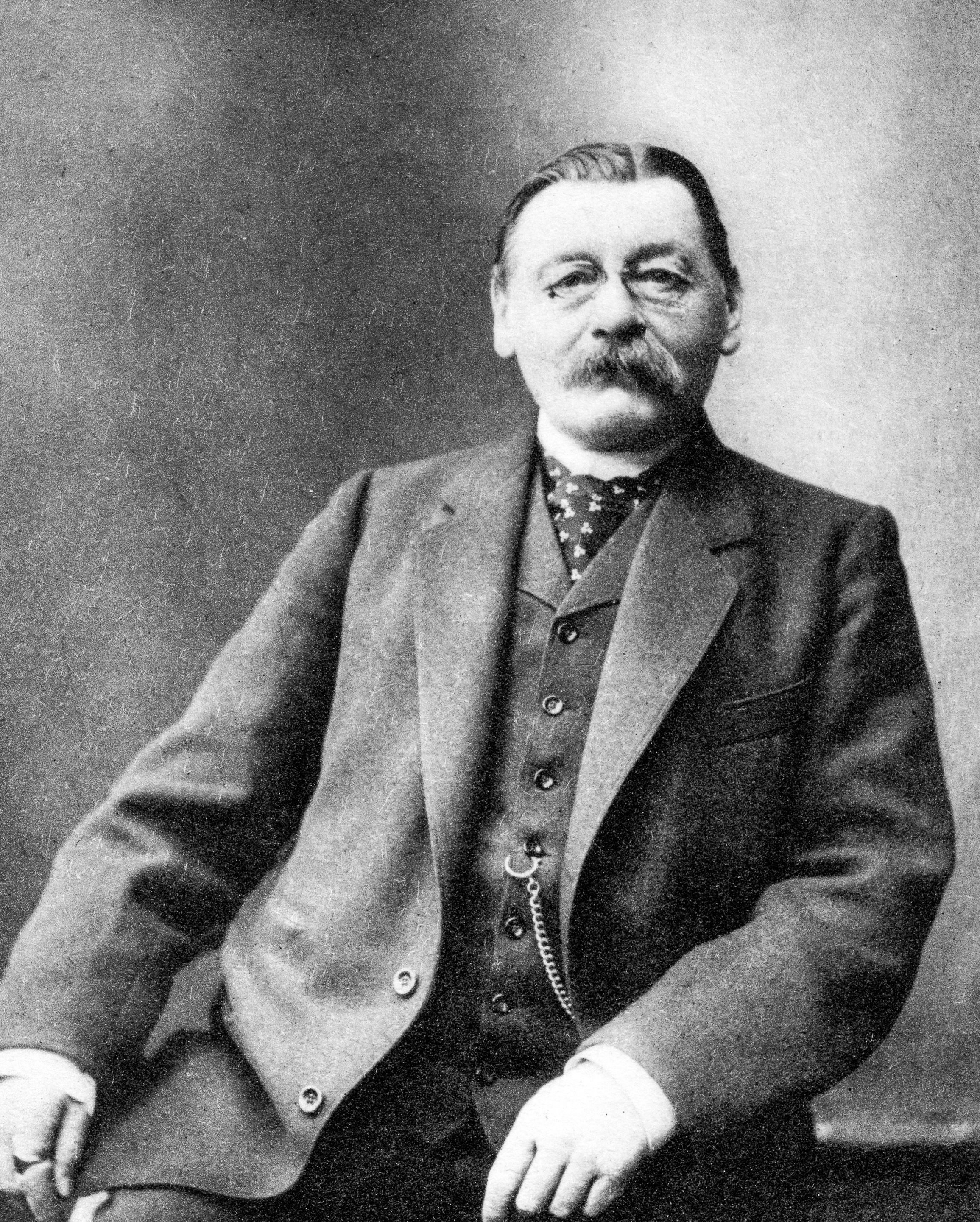
- Born: 20 May 1838; Bonn, Prussia (now Germany)
- Died: 11 June 1912 (aged 74); Bonn, Germany
- Resting place: Alter Friedhof, Bonn, Germany
- Education: University of Bonn
- Scientific career
- Fields: geology
- Workplaces: University of Leipzig

Signature
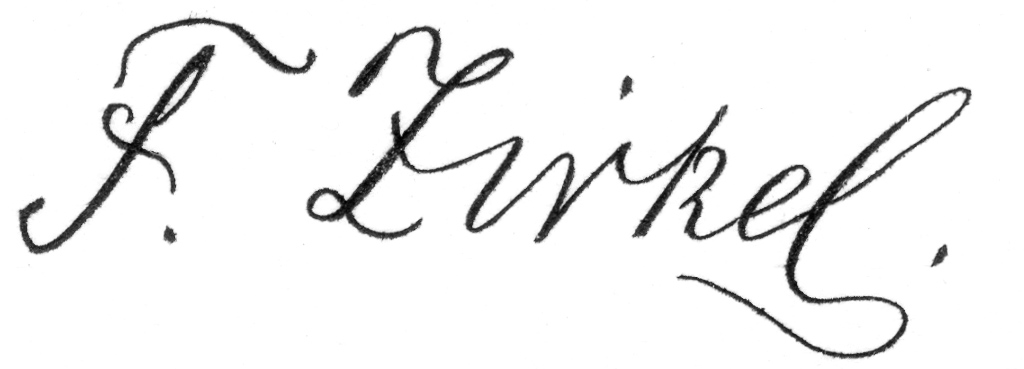

Prof Ferdinand Zirkel FRS(For) HFRSE (20 May 1838 – 11 June 1912) was a German geologist and petrographer.

== Biography ==
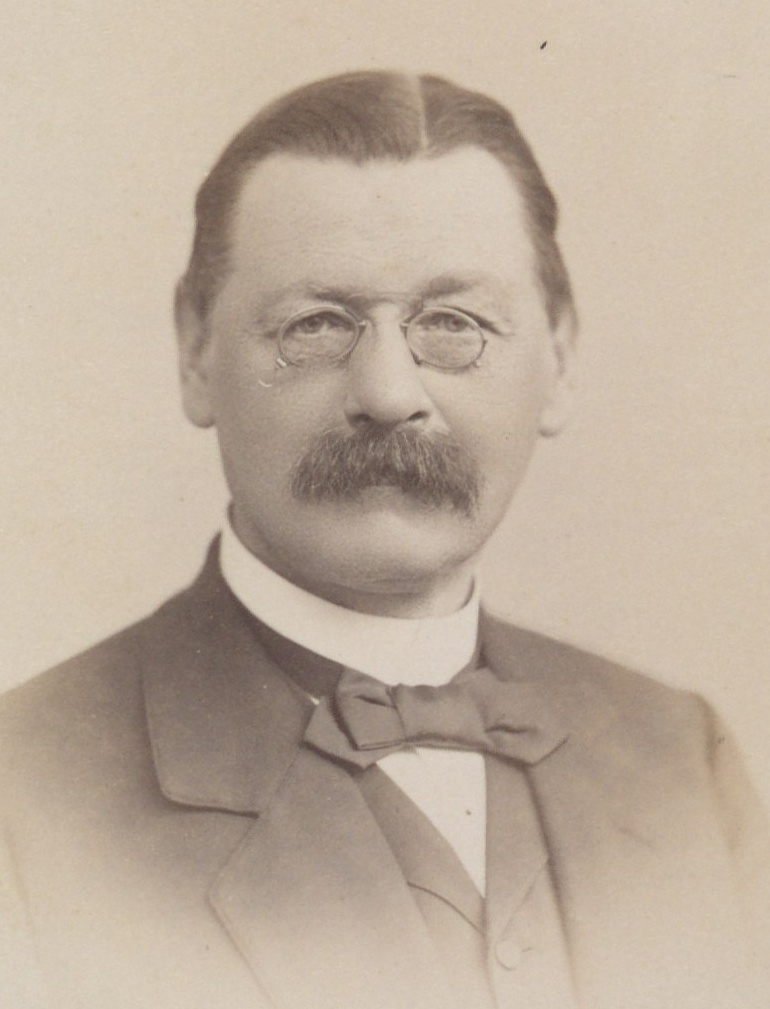
Ferdinand Zirkel, 1899

Zirkel was born in Bonn. Educated in his native town, he graduated PhD from the University of Bonn in 1861. His training and initial interest was in mining. In 1860 he traveled to Iceland with William Thierry Preyer, and in 1862 they published Reise nach Island im Sommer 1860.

After graduation, Zirkel was engaged in teaching geology and mineralogy in Vienna at the Geological Institution. His journey to Iceland, along with travels to the Faeroe Islands, Scotland and England, and a meeting with Henry Clifton Sorby, led him from mining to the study of microscopical petrography, then a comparatively new science.

He became professor of geology in 1863 in the University of Lemberg, in 1868 at the University of Kiel, and in 1870 was made professor of mineralogy and geology in the University of Leipzig. He traveled for study in France, Italy, and Scotland; came to the United States in 1874 to examine the great collections of minerals made during the exploration of the fortieth degree of latitude. He was elected to honorary membership of the Manchester Literary and Philosophical Society on 17 April 1888 and in 1894-95 pursued scientific investigations in Ceylon and India.

He retired in 1909. He was an honorary D.Sc. of Oxford University, and also a foreign member of the Royal Society and an honorary member of the Mineralogical Society.

== Publications ==
His numerous papers and essays include Geologische Skizze van der Westküste Schottlands (1871); Die Struktur der Variolite (1875); Microscopical Petrography (in Report of U.S. Geol. Exploration of 40th Par., vol. vi., 1876); Limurit aus der Vallée de Lesponne (1879); Über den Zirkon (1880). His separate works include Lehrbuch der Petrographie (1866; 2nd ed. 1893, 1894); Die mikroskopische Beschaffenheit der Mineralien und Gesteine (1873); and Über Urausscheidungen rheinischer Basalte (1893).

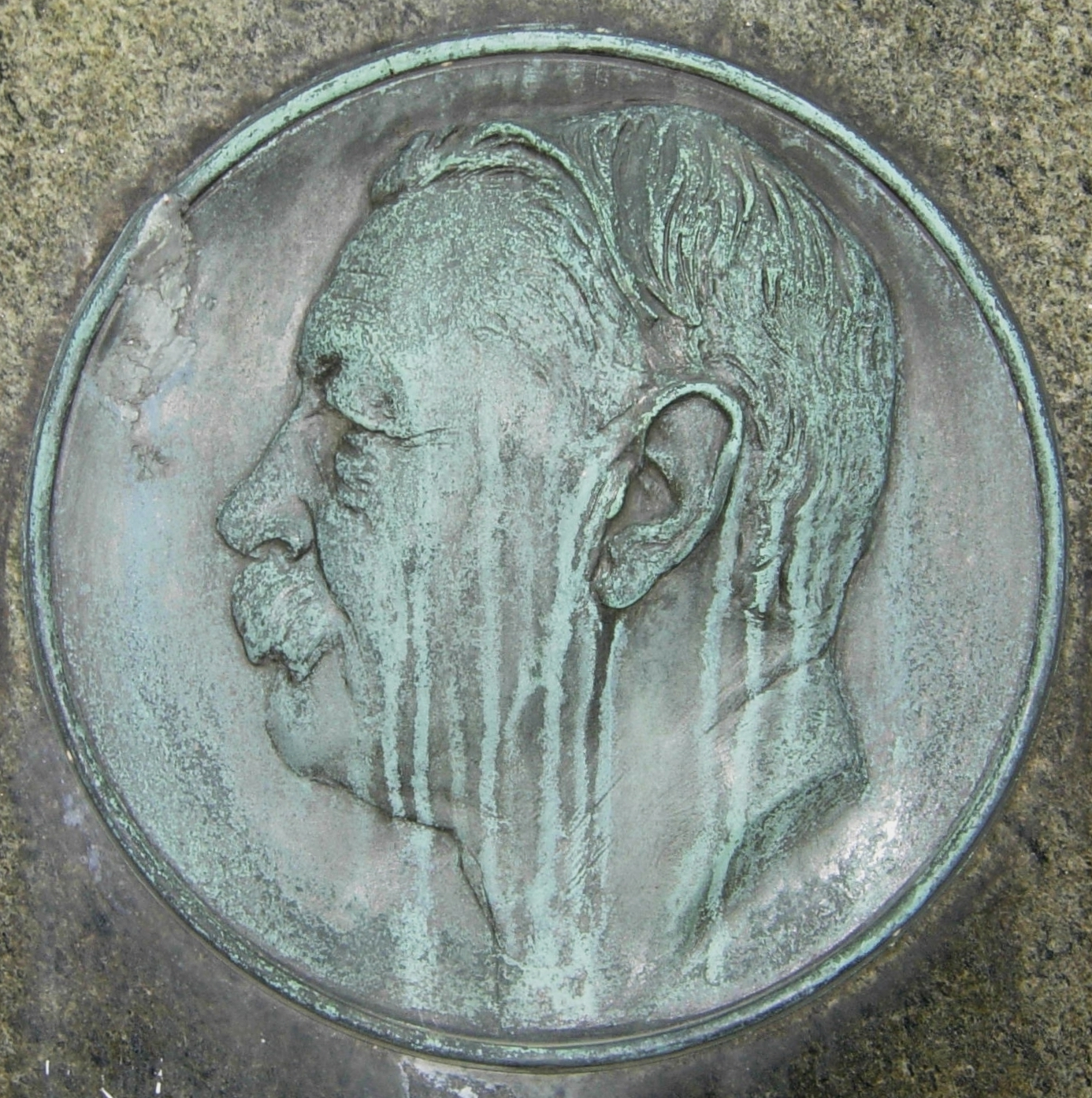
Bronze medallion by Carl Seffner at the Alter Friedhof, Bonn

== Recognition ==
- Mount Zirkel in the Park Range of Colorado, USA, is named after him.
- The mineral zirkelite is named after him.
- Dorsum Zirkel on the Moon is named after him.
