= South San Juan Wilderness =

Protected area in southern Colorado, US

- IUCN category Ib (wilderness area)
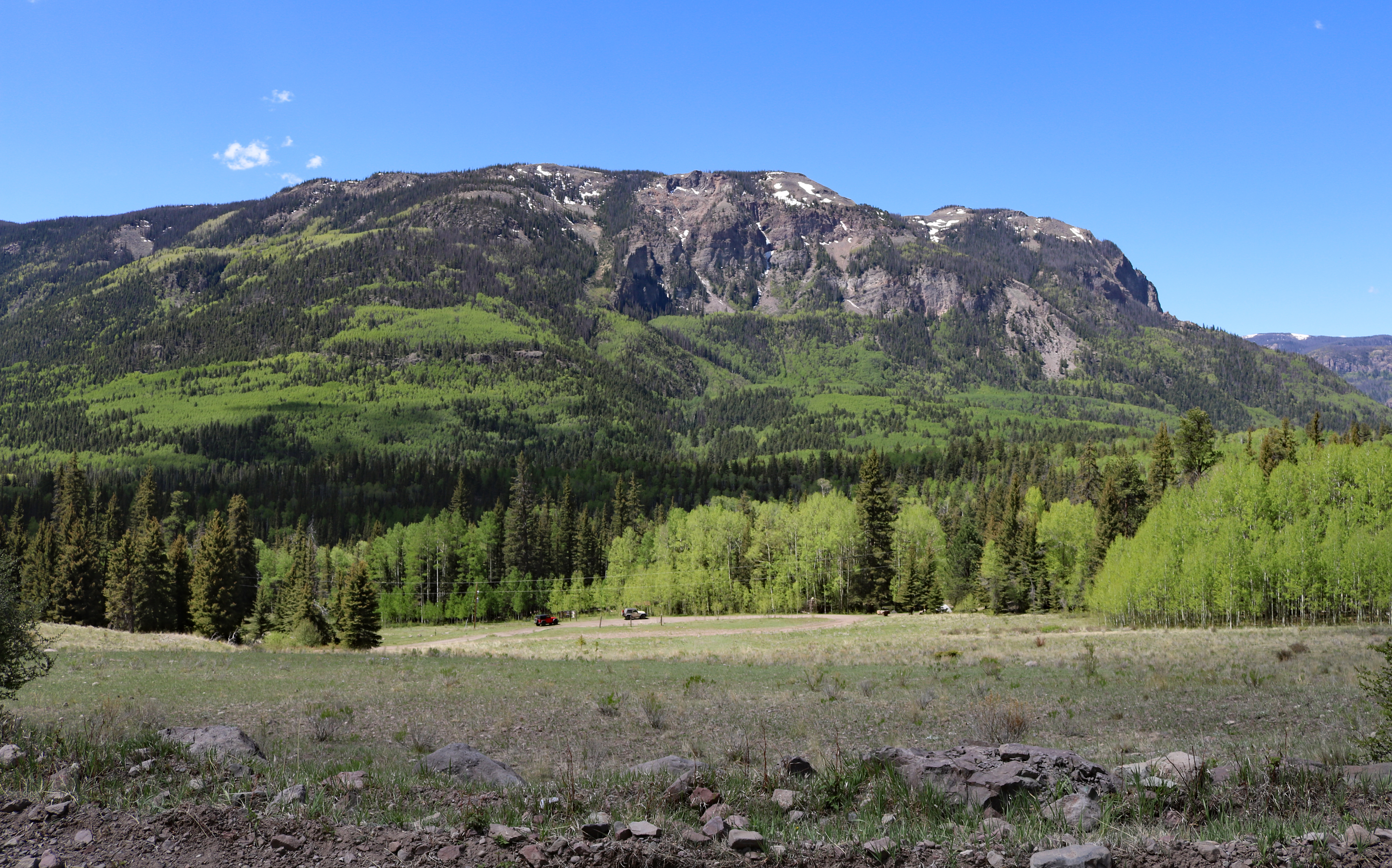
- A mountain in the wilderness at the confluence of the Conejos and South Fork Conejos rivers

- Location within the United States
- Location: Archuleta / Conejos counties, Colorado, USA
- Nearest city: Pagosa Springs, CO
- Coordinates: 37°40′N 106°38′W
- Area: 158,790 acres (642.6 km^{2})
- Established: 1980
- Governing body: U.S. Forest Service

The South San Juan Wilderness is a U.S. Wilderness Area located in the San Juan National Forest, east of Pagosa Springs, in southern Colorado. The area, which spans 158,790 acres, was designated a Wilderness Area and put into the National Wilderness Preservation System in 1980 by the United States Congress.

The Conejos, San Juan, and Blanco rivers all begin in the area.

The last known grizzly bear in Colorado was killed in the wilderness in 1979. Some believe that it is still home to a few grizzlies, but there is no sufficient evidence yet to prove this.

== Recreation ==
The wilderness area contains: 32 lakes, many peaks above 13,000 feet (4,000 m), the highest of which is Summit Peak at 13,307 feet, and 180 miles (290 km) of hiking trails, that includes 42 miles (68 km) of the Continental Divide Trail.
