= Kenosha Mountains =

Mountain in Colorado, United States

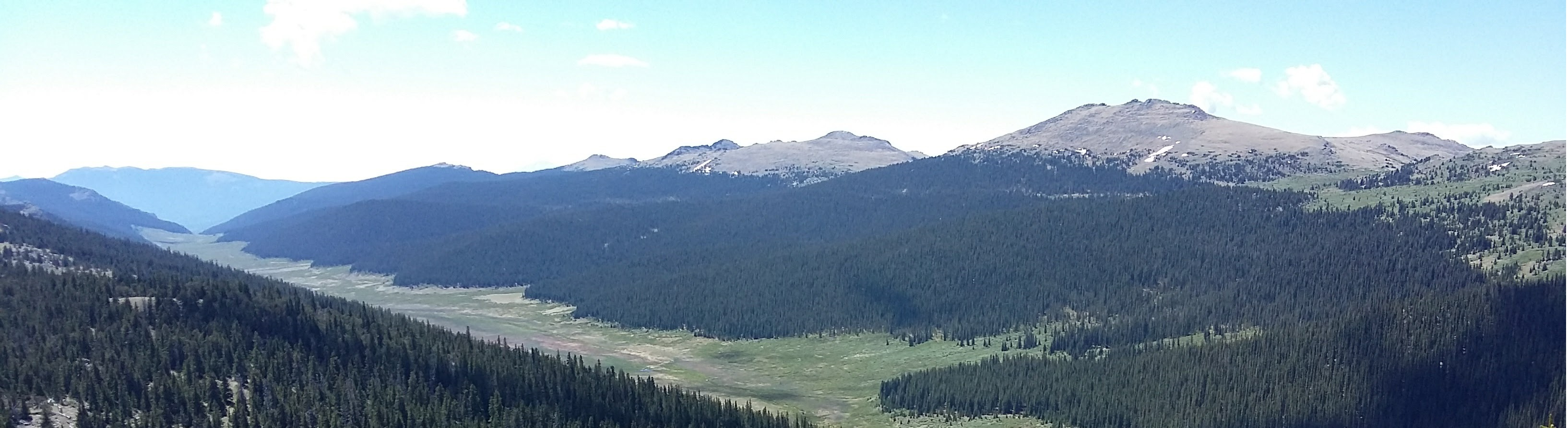
- Kenosha Mountains viewed from Platte Peak looking southeast.

Highest point
- Peak: Knobby Crest(Peak X)
- Elevation: 12,429 ft (3,788 m)
- Listing: Mountain ranges of Colorado
- Coordinates: 39°22′5″N 105°36′18″W

Geography
- Location within Colorado
- Country: United States
- State: Colorado
- Parent range: Front Range

The Kenosha Mountains or Kenosha Mountain are a subrange (or long mountain) of the Front Range located in Park and Jefferson counties of Colorado. Lying within the Pike National Forest, the range extends 36 miles (58 km) from where it meets the Platte River Mountains to the northwest, to Windy Peak to the southeast. This long mountain is bordered by the Platte River Mountains on the north and the Tarryall Mountains on the south.
