= Park Range (Colorado) =

Mountain range in Colorado, United States

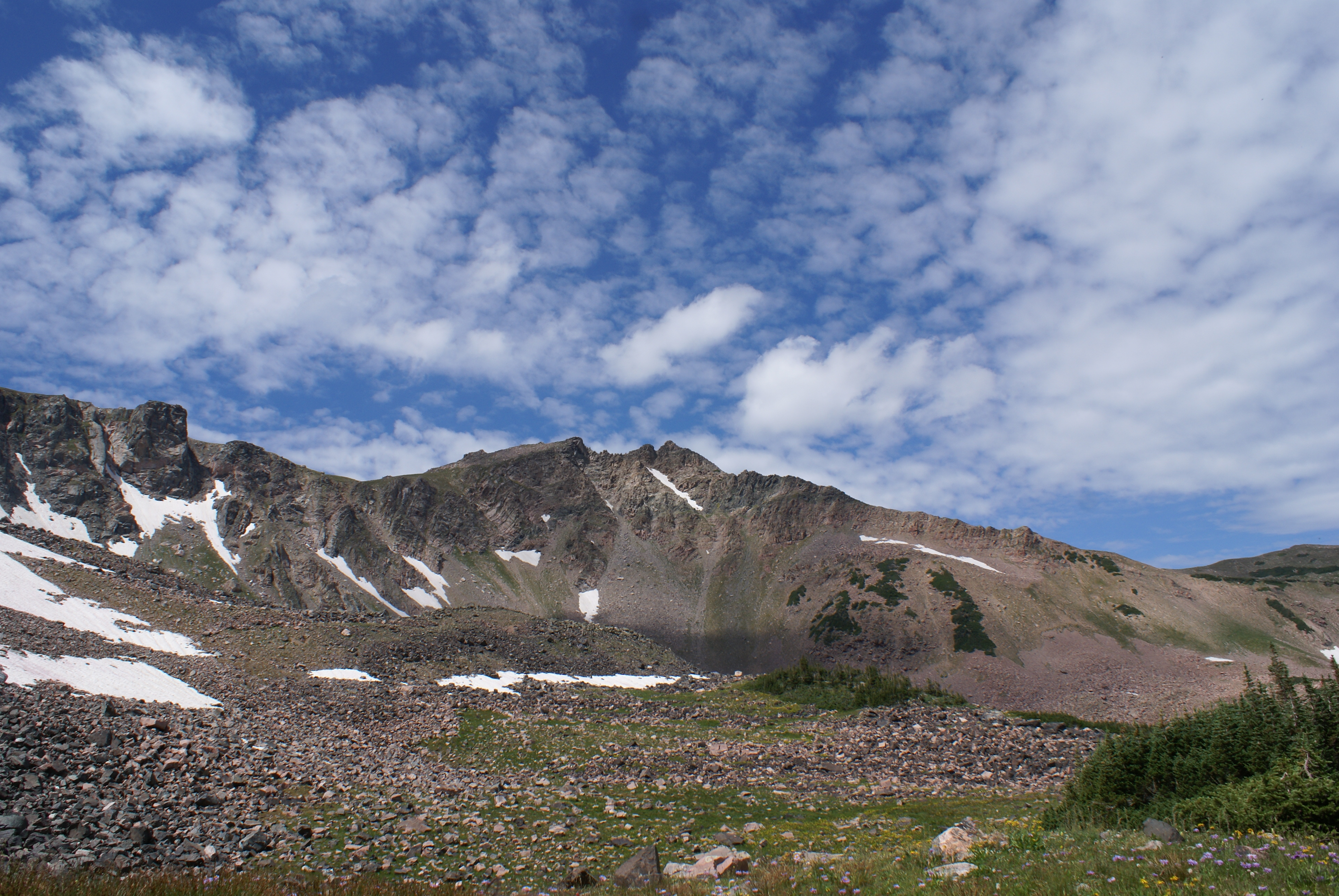
- West face of Mount Zirkel

Highest point
- Peak: Mount Zirkel
- Elevation: 3,712 m (12,178 ft)
- Listing: Mountain ranges of Colorado
- Coordinates: 40°49′52″N 106°39′47″W

Dimensions
- Length: 170 km (110 mi) N-S
- Width: 143 km (89 mi) E-W
- Area: 5,684 mi^{2} (14,720 km^{2})

Geography
- Location within Colorado
- Country: United States
- State: Colorado
- County: Jackson; Routt
- Parent range: Rocky Mountains

The Park Range, elevation approximately 3,712 meters (12,178 ft), is a mountain range in the Rocky Mountains of northwestern Colorado in the United States. The range forms a relatively isolated part of the Continental Divide, extending north-to-south for approximately 170 kilometres (110 mi) along the boundary between Jackson (east) and Routt counties. It separates North Park in the upper basin of the North Platte River on the east from the Elk River basin in the watershed of the Yampa River the west. It rises steeply out of the Yampa River basin, forming a climatic barrier that receives much snowfall in winter. The northern end of the range lies in Wyoming and is known as the Sierra Madre Range.

Steamboat Springs, a popular ski resort community, sits on the southwestern flank of the range, at the base of Mount Werner. Much of the range is located within the Routt National Forest, with the summit of the ridge located within the Mount Zirkel Wilderness, named for Mount Zirkel, elevation 12,182 ft (3,713 m). The range is prominently visible from both sides and forms a picturesque skyline from much of North Park. It is traversed at its southern end by Rabbit Ears Pass which carries US 40. It is also traversed by Buffalo Pass which carries a gravel road between Steamboat Springs and Walden, and which is traversable by most vehicles in good weather during summer.

== See also ==
- Sierra Madre Range
- Elkhead Mountains
