= French Mountain =

Mountain in Colorado, United States

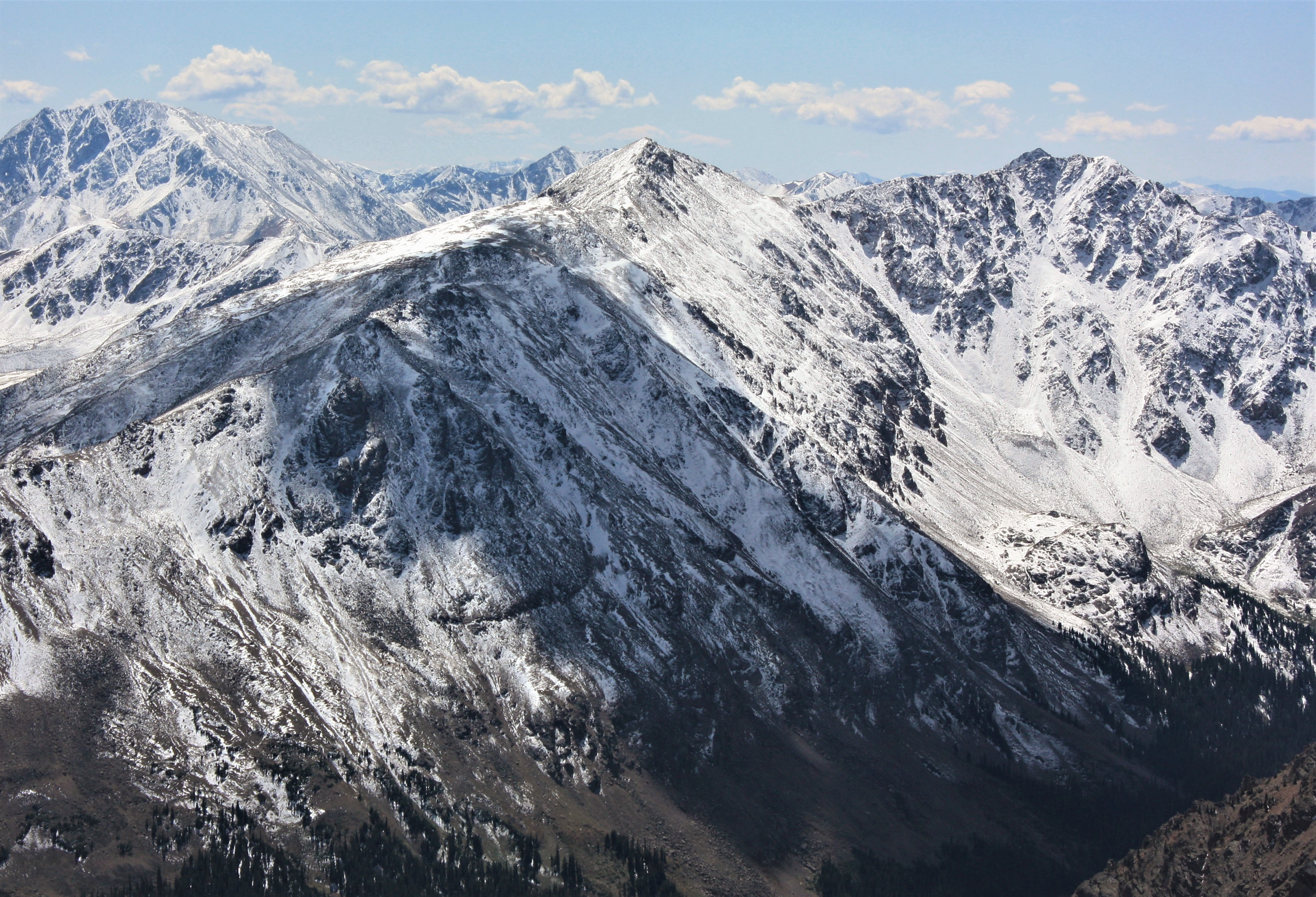
- North aspect, centered

Highest point
- Elevation: 13,966 ft (4,257 m)
- Prominence: 1,100 ft (335 m)
- Parent peak: Mount Elbert
- Isolation: 2.11 mi (3.40 km)
- Coordinates: 39°07′43″N 106°28′57″W

Geography
- Location within Colorado
- Location: Lake County, Colorado, U.S.
- Parent range: Sawatch Range, Elbert Massif
- Topo map(s): USGS 7.5' topographic map Mount Massive, Colorado

French Mountain is a high mountain summit in the Sawatch Range of the Rocky Mountains of North America. The 13,966-foot (4,257 m) thirteener is located on the Elbert Massif in San Isabel National Forest, 13.0 miles (20.9 km) southwest by west (bearing 231°) of the City of Leadville in Lake County, Colorado, United States.

== Climate ==
According to the Köppen climate classification system, French Mountain is located in an alpine subarctic climate zone with cold, snowy winters, and cool to warm summers. Due to its altitude, it receives precipitation all year, as snow in winter, and as thunderstorms in summer, with a dry period in late spring.

== Historical names ==
- French Mountain
- French Peak

== See also ==
- List of Colorado mountain ranges
- List of Colorado mountain summits
  - List of Colorado fourteeners
  - List of Colorado 4000 meter prominent summits
  - List of the most prominent summits of Colorado
- List of Colorado county high points
