= Mount Oklahoma =

Mountain in Colorado, United States

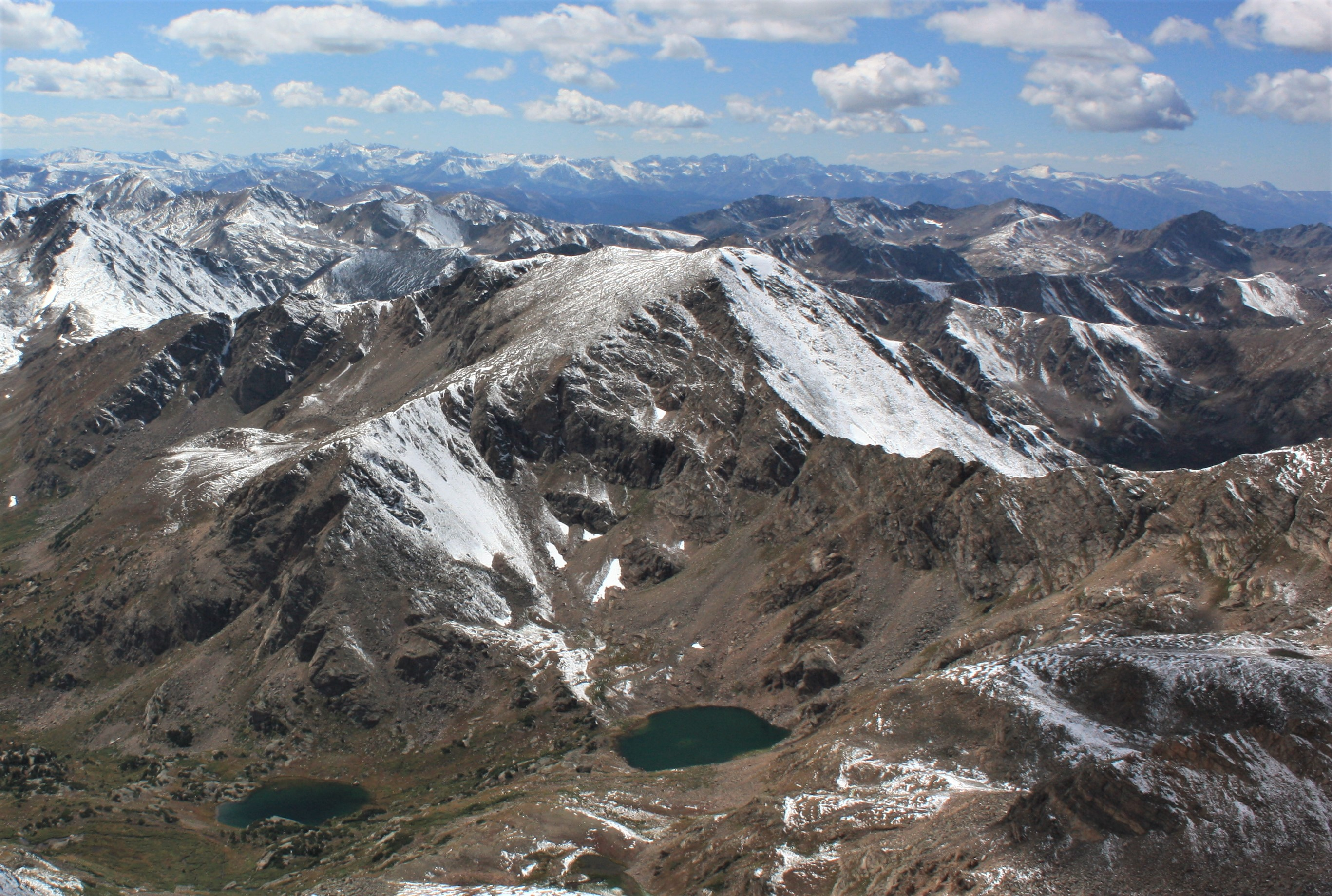
- Northeast aspect, centered, from Mount Massive

Highest point
- Elevation: 13,852 ft (4,222 m)
- Prominence: 745 ft (227 m)
- Parent peak: Mount Massive
- Isolation: 1.52 mi (2.45 km)
- Coordinates: 39°10′44″N 106°30′22″W

Geography
- Location within Colorado
- Location: Continental Divide between Lake and Pitkin counties, Colorado, United States
- Parent range: Sawatch Range, Massive Massif
- Topo map(s): USGS 7.5' topographic map Mount Champion, Colorado

Mount Oklahoma is a high mountain summit in the Sawatch Range of the Rocky Mountains of North America. The 13,852-foot (4,222 m) thirteener is located 5.7 miles (9.2 km) northeast by north (bearing 33°) of Independence Pass, Colorado, United States, on the Continental Divide separating the Mount Massive Wilderness in San Isabel National Forest and Lake County from the Hunter-Fryingpan Wilderness in White River National Forest and Pitkin County. The mountain was named in honor of the University of Oklahoma.

== Climate ==
According to the Köppen climate classification system, Mt. Oklahoma is located in an alpine subarctic climate zone with cold, snowy winters, and cool to warm summers. Due to its altitude, it receives precipitation all year, as snow in winter, and as thunderstorms in summer, with a dry period in late spring.

== Historical names ==
- Mount Oklahoma – 1967
- Oklahoma Mount

== See also ==
- List of Colorado mountain ranges
- List of Colorado mountain summits
  - List of Colorado fourteeners
  - List of Colorado 4000 meter prominent summits
  - List of the most prominent summits of Colorado
- List of Colorado county high points
