= List of mountain peaks of the Rocky Mountains =

List of mountain summits of the Rocky Mountains of North America

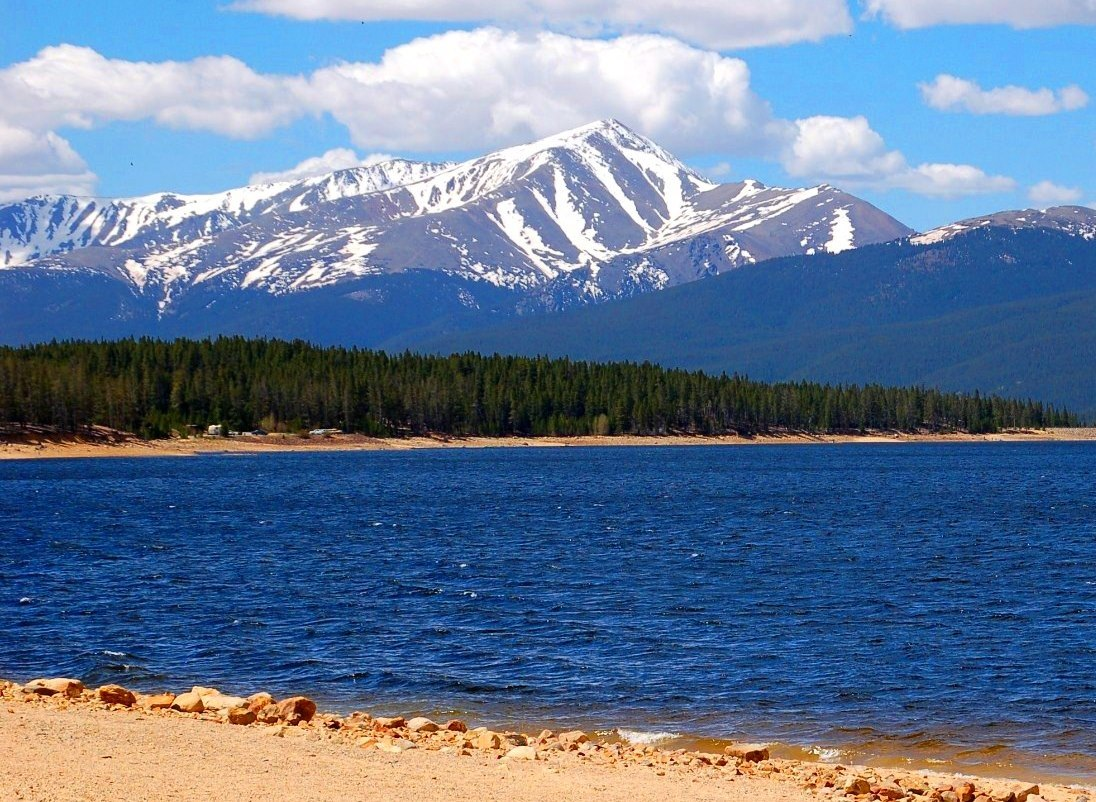
Mount Elbert in the Sawatch Range is the highest summit of the Rocky Mountains and the U.S. state of Colorado.

This article comprises three sortable tables of major mountain peaks of the Rocky Mountains of North America.

The summit of a mountain or hill may be measured in three principal ways:

1. The topographic elevation of a summit measures the height of the summit above a geodetic sea level. The first table below ranks the 100 highest major summits of greater North America by elevation.
2. The topographic prominence of a summit is a measure of how high the summit rises above its surroundings. The second table below ranks the 50 most prominent summits of greater North America.
3. The topographic isolation (or radius of dominance) of a summit measures how far the summit lies from its nearest point of equal elevation. The third table below ranks the 50 most isolated major summits of greater North America.

== Highest major summits ==
Of the 100 highest major summits of the Rocky Mountains, 62 peaks exceed 4000 meters (13,123 feet) elevation, and all 100 peaks exceed 3746 meters (12,290 feet) elevation.

Of these 100 peaks, 78 (including the 30 highest) are located in Colorado, ten in Wyoming, six in New Mexico, three in Montana, and one each in Utah, British Columbia, and Idaho.

The 100 highest summits of the Rocky Mountains with at least 500 meters of topographic prominence
Rank	Mountain peak	Region	Mountain range	Elevation	Prominence	Isolation	Location
1	Mount Elbert (Note: The summit of Mount Elbert is the highest point of the U.S. State of Colorado, the Rocky Mountains of North America, and the entire Mississippi River drainage basin.)	Colorado	Sawatch Range	4401.2 m 14,440 ft	2772 m 9,093 ft	1,079 km 671 mi	39.1178°N 106.4454°W
2	Mount Massive (Note: Mount Massive is the second highest major summit of the Rocky Mountains.) (Note: The elevation of Mount Massive includes an adjustment of +2.087 m (6.85 ft) from NGVD 29 to NAVD 88.)	Colorado	Sawatch Range	4396.3 m 14,424 ft	603 m 1,978 ft	8.21 km 5.1 mi	39.1178°N 106.4454°W
3	Mount Harvard (Note: The summit of Mount Harvard is the highest point of the Collegiate Peaks.) (Note: Mount Harvard is the southernmost and easternmost summit of its elevation in the Rocky Mountains.)	Colorado	Sawatch Range	4395.6 m 14,421 ft	719 m 2,360 ft	24 km 14.92 mi	38.9244°N 106.3207°W
4	Blanca Peak (Note: The summit of Blanca Peak is the highest point of the Sangre de Cristo Mountains and the entire Rio Grande drainage basin.) (Note: Blanca Peak is the southernmost ultra-prominent summit of the Rocky Mountains.) (Note: The elevation of Blanca Peak includes an adjustment of +1.755 m (5.76 ft) from NGVD 29 to NAVD 88.)	Colorado	Sangre de Cristo Mountains	4374 m 14,351 ft	1623 m 5,326 ft	166.4 km 103.4 mi	37.5775°N 105.4856°W
5	La Plata Peak (Note: The elevation of La Plata Peak includes an adjustment of +1.983 m (6.51 ft) from NGVD 29 to NAVD 88.)	Colorado	Sawatch Range	4372 m 14,343 ft	560 m 1,836 ft	10.11 km 6.28 mi	39.0294°N 106.4729°W
6	Uncompahgre Peak (Note: The summit of Uncompahgre Peak is the highest point of the San Juan Mountains and the entire Gulf of California drainage basin.) (Note: Uncompahgre Peak is the westernmost summit of its elevation in the Rocky Mountains.)	Colorado	San Juan Mountains	4365 m 14,321 ft	1304 m 4,277 ft	136.8 km 85 mi	38.0717°N 107.4621°W
7	Crestone Peak (Note: The summit of Crestone Peak is the highest point of the Crestones.) (Note: The elevation of Crestone Peak includes an adjustment of +1.76 m (5.77 ft) from NGVD 29 to NAVD 88.)	Colorado	Sangre de Cristo Range	4359 m 14,300 ft	1388 m 4,554 ft	44 km 27.4 mi	37.9669°N 105.5855°W
8	Mount Lincoln (Note: The summit of Mount Lincoln is the highest point of the Mosquito Range and the entire Missouri River drainage basin.) (Note: Mount Lincoln is the northernmost summit of its elevation in the Rocky Mountains.)	Colorado	Mosquito Range	4356.5 m 14,293 ft	1177 m 3,862 ft	36.2 km 22.5 mi	39.3515°N 106.1116°W
9	Castle Peak (Note: The summit of Castle Peak is the highest point of the Elk Mountains.)	Colorado	Elk Mountains	4352.2 m 14,279 ft	721 m 2,365 ft	33.6 km 20.9 mi	39.0097°N 106.8614°W
10	Grays Peak (Note: The summit of Grays Peak is the highest point of the Front Range and the Continental Divide in North America.) (Note: Grays Peak is the northernmost summit of its elevation in the Rocky Mountains.)	Colorado	Front Range	4352 m 14,278 ft	844 m 2,770 ft	40.2 km 25 mi	39.6339°N 105.8176°W
11	Mount Antero (Note: The summit of Mount Antero is the highest point of the southern Sawatch Range.)	Colorado	Sawatch Range	4351.4 m 14,276 ft	763 m 2,503 ft	28.4 km 17.67 mi	38.6741°N 106.2462°W
12	Mount Blue Sky (Note: The summit elevation of Mount Blue Sky includes a vertical offset of +1.798 m (5.9 ft) from the station benchmark.)	Colorado	Front Range	4350 m 14,271 ft	844 m 2,770 ft	15.76 km 9.79 mi	39.5883°N 105.6438°W
13	Longs Peak (Note: The summit of Longs Peak is the highest point of the northern Front Range.) (Note: Longs Peak is the northernmost 14,000-foot (4267-meter) summit of the Rocky Mountains.)	Colorado	Front Range	4346 m 14,259 ft	896 m 2,940 ft	70.2 km 43.6 mi	40.2550°N 105.6151°W
14	Mount Wilson (Note: The summit of Mount Wilson is the highest point of the San Miguel Mountains.) (Note: Mount Wilson is the westernmost summit of its elevation in the Rocky Mountains.) (Note: The elevation of Mount Wilson includes an adjustment of +1.899 m (6.23 ft) from NGVD 29 to NAVD 88.)	Colorado	San Miguel Mountains	4344 m 14,252 ft	1227 m 4,024 ft	53.1 km 33 mi	37.8391°N 107.9916°W
15	Mount Princeton	Colorado	Sawatch Range	4329.3 m 14,204 ft	664 m 2,177 ft	8.36 km 5.19 mi	38.7492°N 106.2424°W
16	Mount Yale	Colorado	Sawatch Range	4328.2 m 14,200 ft	578 m 1,896 ft	8.93 km 5.55 mi	38.8442°N 106.3138°W
17	Maroon Peak	Colorado	Elk Mountains	4317 m 14,163 ft	712 m 2,336 ft	12.97 km 8.06 mi	39.0708°N 106.9890°W
18	Mount Sneffels (Note: The summit of Mount Sneffels is the highest point of the Sneffels Range.)	Colorado	Sneffels Range	4315.4 m 14,158 ft	930 m 3,050 ft	25.3 km 15.71 mi	38.0038°N 107.7923°W
19	Capitol Peak (Note: The elevation of Capitol Peak includes an adjustment of +1.991 m (6.53 ft) from NGVD 29 to NAVD 88.)	Colorado	Elk Mountains	4309 m 14,137 ft	533 m 1,750 ft	11.98 km 7.44 mi	39.1503°N 107.0829°W
20	Pikes Peak (Note: Pikes Peak is the easternmost 14,000-foot (4267-meter) summit and ultra-prominent summit of the Rocky Mountains. Pikes Peak was the inspiration for the lyrics of America the Beautiful.)	Colorado	Front Range	4302.31 m 14,115 ft	1686 m 5,530 ft	97.6 km 60.6 mi	38.8405°N 105.0442°W
21	Windom Peak (Note: The summit of Windom Peak is the highest point of the Needle Mountains.) (Note: Mount Eolus may be higher than Windom Peak.) (Note: The elevation of Windom Peak includes an adjustment of +1.785 m (5.86 ft) from NGVD 29 to NAVD 88.)	Colorado	Needle Mountains	4296 m 14,093 ft	667 m 2,187 ft	42.4 km 26.3 mi	37.6212°N 107.5919°W
22	Handies Peak	Colorado	San Juan Mountains	4284.8 m 14,058 ft	582 m 1,908 ft	18 km 11.18 mi	37.9130°N 107.5044°W
23	Culebra Peak (Note: The summit of Culebra Peak is the highest point of the Culebra Range.) (Note: Culebra Peak is the southernmost 14,000-foot (4267-meter) summit of the Rocky Mountains.) (Note: The elevation of Culebra Peak includes an adjustment of +1.74 m (5.71 ft) from NGVD 29 to NAVD 88.)	Colorado	Culebra Range	4283 m 14,053 ft	1471 m 4,827 ft	56.9 km 35.4 mi	37.1224°N 105.1858°W
24	San Luis Peak	Colorado	San Juan Mountains	4273.8 m 14,022 ft	949 m 3,113 ft	43.4 km 26.9 mi	37.9868°N 106.9313°W
25	Mount of the Holy Cross (Note: The summit of Mount of the Holy Cross is the highest point of the northern Sawatch Range.) (Note: The summit elevation of Mount of the Holy Cross includes a vertical offset of +0.61 m (2 ft) from the station benchmark.)	Colorado	Sawatch Range	4270.5 m 14,011 ft	644 m 2,113 ft	29.6 km 18.41 mi	39.4668°N 106.4817°W
26	Grizzly Peak	Colorado	Sawatch Range	4265.6 m 13,995 ft	588 m 1,928 ft	10.89 km 6.77 mi	39.0425°N 106.5976°W
27	Mount Ouray (Note: The summit of Mount Ouray is the highest point of the far southern Sawatch Range.)	Colorado	Sawatch Range	4255.4 m 13,961 ft	810 m 2,659 ft	21.9 km 13.58 mi	38.4227°N 106.2247°W
28	Vermilion Peak (Note: The elevation of Vermilion Peak includes an adjustment of +1.827 m (5.99 ft) from NGVD 29 to NAVD 88.)	Colorado	San Juan Mountains	4237 m 13,900 ft	642 m 2,105 ft	14.6 km 9.07 mi	37.7993°N 107.8285°W
29	Mount Silverheels	Colorado	Front Range	4215 m 13,829 ft	696 m 2,283 ft	8.82 km 5.48 mi	39.3394°N 106.0054°W
30	Rio Grande Pyramid	Colorado	San Juan Mountains	4214.4 m 13,827 ft	573 m 1,881 ft	17.31 km 10.76 mi	37.6797°N 107.3924°W
31	Gannett Peak (Note: The summit of Gannett Peak is the highest point of the Wind River Range, the U.S. State of Wyoming, and the central Rocky Mountains.) (Note: Gannett Peak is the northernmost and westernmost summit of its elevation in the Rocky Mountains.)	Wyoming	Wind River Range	4209.1 m 13,809 ft	2157 m 7,076 ft	467 km 290 mi	43.1842°N 109.6542°W
32	Grand Teton (Note: The summit of Grand Teton is the highest point of the Teton Range.) (Note: Grand Teton is the northernmost and westernmost 4000-meter (13,123-foot) summit of the Rocky Mountains.)	Wyoming	Teton Range	4198.7 m 13,775 ft	1995 m 6,545 ft	111.6 km 69.4 mi	43.7412°N 110.8024°W
33	Bald Mountain (Note: The elevation of Bald Mountain includes an adjustment of +1.922 m (6.31 ft) from NGVD 29 to NAVD 88.)	Colorado	Front Range	4173 m 13,690 ft	640 m 2,099 ft	12.09 km 7.51 mi	39.4448°N 105.9705°W
34	Mount Oso (Note: The elevation of Mount Oso includes an adjustment of +1.776 m (5.83 ft) from NGVD 29 to NAVD 88.)	Colorado	San Juan Mountains	4173 m 13,690 ft	507 m 1,664 ft	8.71 km 5.41 mi	37.6070°N 107.4936°W
35	Mount Jackson	Colorado	Sawatch Range	4168.5 m 13,676 ft	552 m 1,810 ft	5.16 km 3.21 mi	39.4853°N 106.5367°W
36	Bard Peak (Note: The elevation of Bard Peak includes an adjustment of +1.707 m (5.6 ft) from NGVD 29 to NAVD 88.)	Colorado	Front Range	4159 m 13,647 ft	518 m 1,701 ft	8.74 km 5.43 mi	39.7204°N 105.8044°W
37	West Spanish Peak (Note: West Spanish Peak is the easternmost 4000-meter (13,123-foot) summit of the Rocky Mountains and the United States.) (Note: The elevation of West Spanish Peak includes an adjustment of +1.468 m (4.82 ft) from NGVD 29 to NAVD 88.)	Colorado	Spanish Peaks	4155 m 13,631 ft	1123 m 3,686 ft	32 km 19.87 mi	37.3756°N 104.9934°W
38	Mount Powell (Note: The summit of Mount Powell is the highest point of the Gore Range.) (Note: The elevation of Mount Powell includes an adjustment of +1.771 m (5.81 ft) from NGVD 29 to NAVD 88.)	Colorado	Gore Range	4141 m 13,586 ft	914 m 3,000 ft	34.6 km 21.5 mi	39.7601°N 106.3407°W
39	Hagues Peak (Note: The summit of Hagues Peak is the highest point of the Mummy Range.)	Colorado	Mummy Range	4137 m 13,573 ft	738 m 2,420 ft	25.3 km 15.7 mi	40.4845°N 105.6464°W
40	Tower Mountain (Note: The elevation of Tower Mountain includes an adjustment of +1.796 m (5.89 ft) from NGVD 29 to NAVD 88.)	Colorado	San Juan Mountains	4132 m 13,558 ft	504 m 1,652 ft	7.86 km 4.88 mi	37.8573°N 107.6230°W
41	Treasure Mountain (Note: The elevation of Treasure Mountain includes an adjustment of +2.008 m (6.59 ft) from NGVD 29 to NAVD 88.)	Colorado	Elk Mountains	4125 m 13,535 ft	862 m 2,828 ft	11.13 km 6.92 mi	39.0244°N 107.1228°W
42	Kings Peak (Note: The summit of Kings Peak is the highest point of the Uinta Mountains, the U.S. State of Utah, and the western Rocky Mountains.) (Note: The elevation of Kings Peak includes an adjustment of +1.807 m (5.93 ft) from NGVD 29 to NAVD 88.)	Utah	Uinta Mountains	4125 m 13,534 ft	1938 m 6,358 ft	268 km 166.6 mi	40.7763°N 110.3729°W
43	North Arapaho Peak (Note: The summit of North Arapaho Peak is the highest point of the Indian Peaks.) (Note: The elevation of North Arapaho Peak includes an adjustment of +1.763 m (5.78 ft) from NGVD 29 to NAVD 88.)	Colorado	Front Range	4117 m 13,508 ft	507 m 1,665 ft	24.8 km 15.38 mi	40.0265°N 105.6504°W
44	Parry Peak (Note: The elevation of Parry Peak includes an adjustment of +1.763 m (5.78 ft) from NGVD 29 to NAVD 88.)	Colorado	Front Range	4083 m 13,397 ft	524 m 1,720 ft	15.22 km 9.46 mi	39.8381°N 105.7132°W
45	Bill Williams Peak (Note: The summit of Bill Williams Peak is the highest point of the Williams Mountains.) (Note: The elevation of Bill Williams Peak includes an adjustment of +2.044 m (6.71 ft) from NGVD 29 to NAVD 88.)	Colorado	Williams Mountains	4081 m 13,389 ft	513 m 1,682 ft	5.98 km 3.72 mi	39.1806°N 106.6102°W
46	Sultan Mountain (Note: The elevation of Sultan Mountain includes an adjustment of +1.649 m (5.41 ft) from NGVD 29 to NAVD 88.)	Colorado	San Juan Mountains	4076 m 13,373 ft	569 m 1,868 ft	7.39 km 4.59 mi	37.7859°N 107.7038°W
47	Mount Herard (Note: The elevation of Mount Herard includes an adjustment of +1.64 m (5.38 ft) from NGVD 29 to NAVD 88.)	Colorado	Sangre de Cristo Mountains	4068 m 13,345 ft	622 m 2,040 ft	7.45 km 4.63 mi	37.8492°N 105.4949°W
48	West Buffalo Peak (Note: The elevation of West Buffalo Peak includes an adjustment of +1.834 m (6.02 ft) from NGVD 29 to NAVD 88.)	Colorado	Mosquito Range	4064 m 13,332 ft	605 m 1,986 ft	15.46 km 9.61 mi	38.9917°N 106.1249°W
49	Summit Peak (Note: The summit of Summit Peak is the highest point of the southern San Juan Mountains.)	Colorado	San Juan Mountains	4056.2 m 13,308 ft	841 m 2,760 ft	63.7 km 39.6 mi	37.3506°N 106.6968°W
50	Middle Peak (Note: Dolores Peak may be higher than Middle Peak.) (Note: The elevation of Middle Peak includes an adjustment of +1.809 m (5.94 ft) from NGVD 29 to NAVD 88.)	Colorado	San Miguel Mountains	4056 m 13,306 ft	597 m 1,960 ft	7.69 km 4.78 mi	37.8536°N 108.1082°W
51	Antora Peak (Note: The elevation of Antora Peak includes an adjustment of +1.883 m (6.18 ft) from NGVD 29 to NAVD 88.)	Colorado	Sawatch Range	4046 m 13,275 ft	734 m 2,409 ft	10.86 km 6.75 mi	38.3250°N 106.2180°W
52	Henry Mountain (Note: The elevation of Henry Mountain includes an adjustment of +2.037 m (6.68 ft) from NGVD 29 to NAVD 88.)	Colorado	Sawatch Range	4042 m 13,261 ft	510 m 1,674 ft	17.61 km 10.94 mi	38.6856°N 106.6211°W
53	Hesperus Mountain (Note: The summit of Hesperus Mountain is the highest point of the La Plata Mountains.) (Note: The elevation of Hesperus Mountain includes an adjustment of +1.65 m (5.41 ft) from NGVD 29 to NAVD 88.)	Colorado	La Plata Mountains	4035 m 13,237 ft	869 m 2,852 ft	39.5 km 24.5 mi	37.4451°N 108.0890°W
54	Jacque Peak (Note: The elevation of Jacque Peak includes an adjustment of +1.866 m (6.12 ft) from NGVD 29 to NAVD 88.)	Colorado	Gore Range	4027 m 13,211 ft	629 m 2,065 ft	7.28 km 4.52 mi	39.4549°N 106.1970°W
55	Bennett Peak (Note: The elevation of Bennett Peak includes an adjustment of +1.782 m (5.85 ft) from NGVD 29 to NAVD 88.)	Colorado	San Juan Mountains	4026 m 13,209 ft	531 m 1,743 ft	27.5 km 17.08 mi	37.4833°N 106.4343°W
56	Wind River Peak (Note: The summit of Wind River Peak is the highest point of the southern Wind River Range.)	Wyoming	Wind River Range	4022.4 m 13,197 ft	784 m 2,572 ft	56.6 km 35.1 mi	42.7085°N 109.1284°W
57	Conejos Peak	Colorado	San Juan Mountains	4017 m 13,179 ft	583 m 1,912 ft	13.12 km 8.15 mi	37.2887°N 106.5709°W
58	Cloud Peak (Note: The summit of Cloud Peak is the highest point of the Bighorn Mountains.) (Note: Cloud Peak is the northernmost 4000-meter (13,123-foot) summit of the Rocky Mountains.)	Wyoming	Bighorn Mountains	4013.3 m 13,167 ft	2157 m 7,077 ft	233 km 145 mi	44.3821°N 107.1739°W
58	Wheeler Peak (Note: The summit of Wheeler Peak is the highest point of the Taos Mountains and the U.S. State of New Mexico.) (Note: Wheeler Peak is the southernmost 4000-meter (13,123-foot) summit of the Rocky Mountains.)	New Mexico	Taos Mountains	4013.3 m 13,167 ft	1039 m 3,409 ft	59.6 km 37 mi	36.5569°N 105.4169°W
60	Francs Peak (Note: The summit of Francs Peak is the highest point of the Absaroka Range.)	Wyoming	Absaroka Range	4012.3 m 13,164 ft	1236 m 4,056 ft	76 km 47.2 mi	43.9613°N 109.3392°W
61	Twilight Peak (Note: The summit of Twilight Peak is the highest point of the West Needle Mountains.) (Note: The elevation of Twilight Peak includes an adjustment of +1.537 m (5.04 ft) from NGVD 29 to NAVD 88.)	Colorado	Needle Mountains	4012 m 13,163 ft	713 m 2,338 ft	7.86 km 4.88 mi	37.6630°N 107.7270°W
62	South River Peak	Colorado	San Juan Mountains	4009.4 m 13,154 ft	746 m 2,448 ft	34 km 21.1 mi	37.5741°N 106.9815°W
63	Bushnell Peak	Colorado	Sangre de Cristo Mountains	3995.8 m 13,110 ft	733 m 2,405 ft	17.82 km 11.07 mi	38.3412°N 105.8892°W
64	Truchas Peak (Note: The summit of Truchas Peak is the highest point of the Santa Fe Mountains.) (Note: Truchas Peak is the southernmost summit of its elevation in the Rocky Mountains.)	New Mexico	Santa Fe Mountains	3995.2 m 13,108 ft	1220 m 4,001 ft	68.2 km 42.3 mi	35.9625°N 105.6450°W
65	West Elk Peak (Note: The summit of West Elk Peak is the highest point of the West Elk Mountains.)	Colorado	West Elk Mountains	3975.2 m 13,042 ft	943 m 3,095 ft	22.2 km 13.78 mi	38.7179°N 107.1994°W
66	Mount Centennial (Note: The elevation of Mount Centennial includes an adjustment of +1.814 m (5.95 ft) from NGVD 29 to NAVD 88.) (Peak 13010)	Colorado	San Juan Mountains	3967 m 13,016 ft	546 m 1,790 ft	4.61 km 2.86 mi	37.6062°N 107.2446°W
67	Mount Robson (Note: The summit of Mount Robson is the highest point of the Canadian Rockies.) (Note: Mount Robson is the easternmost summit of its elevation in Canada and the northernmost and westernmost summit of its elevation in the Rocky Mountains.)	British Columbia	Canadian Rockies	3954 m 12,972 ft	2829 m 9,281 ft	460 km 286 mi	53.1105°N 119.1566°W
68	Clark Peak (Note: The summit of Clark Peak is the highest point of the Medicine Bow Mountains.)	Colorado	Medicine Bow Mountains	3948.4 m 12,954 ft	845 m 2,771 ft	26.4 km 16.4 mi	40.6068°N 105.9300°W
69	Mount Richthofen (Note: The summit of Mount Richthofen is the highest point of the Never Summer Mountains.) (Note: The elevation of Mount Richthofen includes an adjustment of +1.658 m (5.44 ft) from NGVD 29 to NAVD 88.)	Colorado	Never Summer Mountains	3946 m 12,945 ft	817 m 2,680 ft	15.54 km 9.66 mi	40.4695°N 105.8945°W
70	Lizard Head Peak (Note: The summit of Lizard Head Peak is the highest point of the Cirque of the Towers.) (Note: The elevation of Lizard Head Peak includes an adjustment of +1.572 m (5.16 ft) from NGVD 29 to NAVD 88.)	Wyoming	Wind River Range	3916 m 12,847 ft	580 m 1,902 ft	10.4 km 6.46 mi	42.7901°N 109.1978°W
71	Granite Peak (Note: The summit of Granite Peak is the highest point of the Beartooth Mountains and the U.S. State of Montana.)	Montana	Beartooth Mountains	3903.5 m 12,807 ft	1457 m 4,779 ft	138.5 km 86 mi	45.1634°N 109.8075°W
72	Venado Peak (Note: The elevation of Venado Peak includes an adjustment of +1.65 m (5.41 ft) from NGVD 29 to NAVD 88.)	New Mexico	Taos Mountains	3883 m 12,739 ft	906 m 2,971 ft	18.99 km 11.8 mi	36.7917°N 105.4933°W
73	Chair Mountain	Colorado	Elk Mountains	3879.1 m 12,727 ft	750 m 2,461 ft	14.3 km 8.89 mi	39.0581°N 107.2822°W
74	Mount Gunnison	Colorado	West Elk Mountains	3878.7 m 12,725 ft	1079 m 3,539 ft	19.05 km 11.84 mi	38.8121°N 107.3826°W
75	East Spanish Peak (Note: East Spanish Peak is the easternmost 3000-meter (9843-foot) summit of the Rocky Mountains and the United States.) (Note: The elevation of East Spanish Peak includes an adjustment of +1.372 m (4.5 ft) from NGVD 29 to NAVD 88.)	Colorado	Spanish Peaks	3867 m 12,688 ft	726 m 2,383 ft	6.78 km 4.21 mi	37.3934°N 104.9201°W
76	Borah Peak (Note: The summit of Borah Peak is the highest point of the Lost River Range and the U.S. State of Idaho.)	Idaho	Lost River Range	3861.2 m 12,668 ft	1829 m 6,002 ft	243 km 150.8 mi	44.1374°N 113.7811°W
77	Mount Wood (Note: The summit of Mount Wood is the highest point of the Granite Range.) (Note: The elevation of Mount Wood includes an adjustment of +1.516 m (4.97 ft) from NGVD 29 to NAVD 88.)	Montana	Beartooth Mountains	3860 m 12,665 ft	878 m 2,880 ft	12.04 km 7.48 mi	45.2749°N 109.8078°W
78	Santa Fe Baldy (Note: Santa Fe Baldy is the southernmost 3000-meter (9843-foot) summit of the Rocky Mountains.)	New Mexico	Santa Fe Mountains	3850.1 m 12,632 ft	610 m 2,002 ft	17.69 km 10.99 mi	35.8322°N 105.7581°W
79	Gothic Mountain (Note: The elevation of Gothic Mountain includes an adjustment of +1.936 m (6.35 ft) from NGVD 29 to NAVD 88.)	Colorado	Elk Mountains	3850 m 12,631 ft	501 m 1,645 ft	4.39 km 2.73 mi	38.9562°N 107.0107°W
80	Castle Mountain	Montana	Beartooth Mountains	3846.1 m 12,618 ft	814 m 2,672 ft	15.67 km 9.74 mi	45.0989°N 109.6305°W
80	Lone Cone	Colorado	San Miguel Mountains	3846.1 m 12,618 ft	693 m 2,273 ft	13.52 km 8.4 mi	37.8880°N 108.2556°W
82	Mount Moran	Wyoming	Teton Range	3843.5 m 12,610 ft	806 m 2,645 ft	9.94 km 6.18 mi	43.8350°N 110.7765°W
83	Little Costilla Peak	New Mexico	Culebra Range	3836.8 m 12,588 ft	745 m 2,444 ft	12.48 km 7.75 mi	36.8335°N 105.2229°W
84	Graham Peak	Colorado	San Juan Mountains	3821.1 m 12,536 ft	778 m 2,551 ft	13.9 km 8.64 mi	37.4972°N 107.3761°W
85	Whetstone Mountain	Colorado	West Elk Mountains	3818.1 m 12,527 ft	749 m 2,456 ft	15.11 km 9.39 mi	38.8223°N 106.9799°W
86	Atlantic Peak (Note: The elevation of Atlantic Peak includes an adjustment of +1.521 m (4.99 ft) from NGVD 29 to NAVD 88.)	Wyoming	Wind River Range	3808 m 12,495 ft	655 m 2,150 ft	14.6 km 9.07 mi	42.6165°N 109.0013°W
87	Specimen Mountain (Note: The elevation of Specimen Mountain includes an adjustment of +1.614 m (5.3 ft) from NGVD 29 to NAVD 88.)	Colorado	Front Range	3808 m 12,494 ft	528 m 1,731 ft	7.56 km 4.7 mi	40.4449°N 105.8081°W
88	Baldy Mountain (Note: The summit of Baldy Mountain is the highest point of the Cimarron Range.)	New Mexico	Cimarron Range	3793.3 m 12,445 ft	823 m 2,701 ft	18.24 km 11.33 mi	36.6299°N 105.2134°W
89	East Beckwith Mountain	Colorado	West Elk Mountains	3792.1 m 12,441 ft	760 m 2,492 ft	10.05 km 6.24 mi	38.8464°N 107.2233°W
90	Knobby Crest (Note: The summit of Knobby Crest is the highest point of the Kenosha Mountains.) (Note: The elevation of Knobby Crest includes an adjustment of +1.595 m (5.23 ft) from NGVD 29 to NAVD 88.)	Colorado	Kenosha Mountains	3790 m 12,434 ft	536 m 1,759 ft	13.31 km 8.27 mi	39.3681°N 105.6050°W
91	Bison Peak (Note: The summit of Bison Peak is the highest point of the Tarryall Mountains.)	Colorado	Tarryall Mountains	3789.4 m 12,432 ft	747 m 2,451 ft	29.3 km 18.23 mi	39.2384°N 105.4978°W
92	Anthracite Range High Point	Colorado	West Elk Mountains	3777.8 m 12,394 ft	648 m 2,125 ft	7.68 km 4.77 mi	38.8145°N 107.1445°W
93	Matchless Mountain (Note: The elevation of Matchless Mountain includes an adjustment of +1.941 m (6.37 ft) from NGVD 29 to NAVD 88.)	Colorado	Elk Mountains	3776 m 12,389 ft	537 m 1,763 ft	12.67 km 7.87 mi	38.8340°N 106.6451°W
94	Flat Top Mountain (Note: The summit of Flat Top Mountain is the highest point of the Flat Tops.)	Colorado	Flat Tops	3767.7 m 12,361 ft	1236 m 4,054 ft	65.6 km 40.8 mi	40.0147°N 107.0833°W
95	Mount Nystrom	Wyoming	Wind River Range	3767.5 m 12,361 ft	554 m 1,816 ft	7.92 km 4.92 mi	42.6418°N 109.0939°W
96	Greenhorn Mountain (Note: The summit of Greenhorn Mountain is the highest point of the Wet Mountains.)	Colorado	Wet Mountains	3765 m 12,352 ft	1151 m 3,777 ft	40.6 km 25.2 mi	37.8815°N 105.0133°W
97	Elliott Mountain (Note: The elevation of Elliott Mountain includes an adjustment of +1.709 m (5.61 ft) from NGVD 29 to NAVD 88.)	Colorado	San Miguel Mountains	3763 m 12,346 ft	683 m 2,240 ft	8.26 km 5.13 mi	37.7344°N 108.0580°W
98	Carter Mountain	Wyoming	Absaroka Range	3756.4 m 12,324 ft	518 m 1,699 ft	26.8 km 16.68 mi	44.1972°N 109.4112°W
99	Parkview Mountain (Note: The summit of Parkview Mountain is the highest point of the Rabbit Ears Range.)	Colorado	Rabbit Ears Range	3749.4 m 12,301 ft	816 m 2,676 ft	15.07 km 9.36 mi	40.3303°N 106.1363°W
100	Cornwall Mountain (Note: The elevation of Cornwall Mountain includes an adjustment of +1.715 m (5.63 ft) from NGVD 29 to NAVD 88.)	Colorado	San Juan Mountains	3746 m 12,291 ft	532 m 1,744 ft	8.37 km 5.2 mi	37.3811°N 106.4920°W

== Most prominent summits ==
Of the 50 most prominent summits of the Rocky Mountains, only Mount Robson and Mount Elbert exceed 2500 meters (8202 feet) of topographic prominence, seven peaks exceed 2000 meters (6562 feet), 31 peaks are ultra-prominent summits with at least 1500 meters (4921 feet), and all 50 peaks exceed 1189 meters (3901 feet) of topographic prominence.

Of these 50 peaks, 12 are located in British Columbia, 12 in Montana, ten in Alberta, eight in Colorado, four in Wyoming, three in Utah, three in Idaho, and one in New Mexico. Three of these peaks lie on the Alberta-British Columbia border.

The 50 most topographically prominent summits of the Rocky Mountains
Rank	Mountain peak	Region	Mountain range	Elevation	Prominence	Isolation	Location
1	Mount Robson	British Columbia	Canadian Rockies	3959 m 12,989 ft	2829 m 9,281 ft	460 km 286 mi	53.1105°N 119.1566°W
2	Mount Elbert	Colorado	Sawatch Range	4401.2 m 14,440 ft	2772 m 9,093 ft	1,079 km 671 mi	39.1178°N 106.4454°W
3	Mount Columbia (Note: Mount Columbia on the Great Divide between British Columbia and Alberta is the highest point of the Columbia Icefield, the Province of Alberta, and the entire Beaufort Sea Drainage basin.)	Alberta; British Columbia	Canadian Rockies	3741 m 12,274 ft	2371 m 7,779 ft	158 km 98.2 mi	52.1473°N 117.4416°W
4	Cloud Peak	Wyoming	Bighorn Mountains	4013.3 m 13,167 ft	2157 m 7,077 ft	233 km 145 mi	44.3821°N 107.1739°W
5	Gannett Peak	Wyoming	Wind River Range	4209.1 m 13,809 ft	2157 m 7,076 ft	467 km 290 mi	43.1842°N 109.6542°W
6	Mount Assiniboine (Note: Mount Assiniboine is the southernmost and easternmost summit of its elevation in Canada.)	Alberta; British Columbia	Canadian Rockies	3616 m 11,864 ft	2082 m 6,831 ft	141.8 km 88.1 mi	50.8696°N 115.6509°W
7	Mount Edith Cavell	Alberta	Canadian Rockies	3363 m 11,033 ft	2033 m 6,670 ft	47.2 km 29.3 mi	52.6672°N 118.0569°W
8	Grand Teton	Wyoming	Teton Range	4198.7 m 13,775 ft	1995 m 6,545 ft	111.6 km 69.4 mi	43.7412°N 110.8024°W
9	Kings Peak	Utah	Uinta Mountains	4125 m 13,534 ft	1938 m 6,358 ft	268 km 166.6 mi	40.7763°N 110.3729°W
10	Mount Goodsir (Note: The summit of Mount Goodsir is the highest point of the Ottertail Range.)	British Columbia	Canadian Rockies	3567 m 11,703 ft	1917 m 6,289 ft	64.1 km 39.8 mi	51.2021°N 116.3975°W
11	Borah Peak	Idaho	Lost River Range	3861.2 m 12,668 ft	1829 m 6,002 ft	243 km 150.8 mi	44.1374°N 113.7811°W
12	Mount Harrison (Note: Mount Harrison is the southernmost and easternmost 3000-meter (9843-foot) summit of Canada.)	British Columbia	Canadian Rockies	3360 m 11,024 ft	1770 m 5,807 ft	52.1 km 32.4 mi	50.0604°N 115.2057°W
13	Mount Sir Alexander (Note: Mount Sir Alexander is the northernmost and westernmost 3000-meter (9843-foot) summit and ultra-prominent summit of the Rocky Mountains.)	British Columbia	Canadian Rockies	3275 m 10,745 ft	1762 m 5,781 ft	87.8 km 54.5 mi	53.9360°N 120.3869°W
14	Mount Hector	Alberta	Canadian Rockies	3394 m 11,135 ft	1759 m 5,771 ft	21.5 km 13.34 mi	51.5752°N 116.2590°W
15	Whitehorn Mountain (Note: Whitehorn Mountain is the northernmost and westernmost summit of its elevation in the Rocky Mountains.)	British Columbia	Canadian Rockies	3399 m 11,152 ft	1747 m 5,732 ft	7.94 km 4.93 mi	53.1370°N 119.2667°W
16	Mount Chown (Note: Mount Chown is the northernmost and westernmost summit of its elevation in the Rocky Mountains.)	Alberta	Canadian Rockies	3316 m 10,879 ft	1746 m 5,728 ft	30.7 km 19.05 mi	53.3971°N 119.4173°W
17	Crazy Peak (Note: The summit of Crazy Peak is the highest point of the Crazy Mountains.) (Note: The elevation of Crazy Peak includes an adjustment of +1.421 m (4.66 ft) from NGVD 29 to NAVD 88.)	Montana	Crazy Mountains	3418 m 11,214 ft	1743 m 5,719 ft	71.8 km 44.6 mi	46.0181°N 110.2768°W
18	McDonald Peak (Note: The summit of McDonald Peak is the highest point of the Mission Range.) (Note: The elevation of McDonald Peak includes an adjustment of +1.318 m (4.32 ft) from NGVD 29 to NAVD 88.)	Montana	Mission Range	2994 m 9,824 ft	1722 m 5,650 ft	127.8 km 79.4 mi	47.3826°N 113.9191°W
19	Pikes Peak	Colorado	Front Range	4302.31 m 14,115 ft	1686 m 5,530 ft	97.6 km 60.6 mi	38.8405°N 105.0442°W
20	Mount Nebo (Note: The summit of Mount Nebo is the highest point of the Wasatch Range.) (Note: The elevation of Mount Nebo includes an adjustment of +1.395 m (4.58 ft) from NGVD 29 to NAVD 88.)	Utah	Wasatch Range	3637 m 11,933 ft	1679 m 5,508 ft	121.6 km 75.6 mi	39.8219°N 111.7603°W
21	Snowshoe Peak (Note: The summit of Snowshoe Peak is the highest point of the Cabinet Mountains.) (Note: The elevation of Snowshoe Peak includes an adjustment of +1.367 m (4.48 ft) from NGVD 29 to NAVD 88.)	Montana	Cabinet Mountains	2665 m 8,743 ft	1658 m 5,438 ft	133.5 km 82.9 mi	48.2231°N 115.6890°W
22	Jeanette Peak	British Columbia	Canadian Rockies	3089 m 10,135 ft	1657 m 5,436 ft	17.54 km 10.9 mi	52.6357°N 118.6166°W
23	Mount Forbes (Note: The summit of Mount Forbes is the highest point of the entire Hudson Bay drainage basin.) (Note: Mount Forbes is the easternmost summit of its elevation in Canada.)	Alberta	Canadian Rockies	3617 m 11,867 ft	1649 m 5,410 ft	47.4 km 29.5 mi	51.8600°N 116.9316°W
24	Diamond Peak (Note: The summit of Diamond Peak is the highest point of the Lemhi Range.)	Idaho	Lemhi Range	3719.3 m 12,202 ft	1642 m 5,387 ft	51.2 km 31.8 mi	44.1414°N 113.0827°W
25	Blanca Peak	Colorado	Sangre de Cristo Mountains	4374 m 14,351 ft	1623 m 5,326 ft	166.4 km 103.4 mi	37.5775°N 105.4856°W
26	Mount Timpanogos (Note: The summit of Mount Timpanogos is the highest point of the central Wasatch Range.)	Utah	Wasatch Range	3582 m 11,752 ft	1609 m 5,279 ft	63.8 km 39.6 mi	40.3908°N 111.6459°W
27	Mount Fryatt (Note: The summit of Mount Fryatt is the highest point of the Hooker Icefield.)	Alberta	Canadian Rockies	3361 m 11,027 ft	1608 m 5,276 ft	16.37 km 10.17 mi	52.5503°N 117.9104°W
28	Mount Cleveland (Note: The summit of Mount Cleveland is the highest point of the Lewis Range.)	Montana	Lewis Range	3194 m 10,479 ft	1599 m 5,246 ft	159.9 km 99.4 mi	48.9249°N 113.8482°W
29	Mount Temple (Note: The summit of Mount Temple is the highest point of the Bow Range.)	Alberta	Canadian Rockies	3540 m 11,614 ft	1530 m 5,020 ft	21.3 km 13.22 mi	51.3511°N 116.2063°W
29	Mount Ida (Note: Mount Ida is the northernmost 3000-meter (9843-foot) summit and ultra-prominent summit of the Rocky Mountains.)	British Columbia	Canadian Rockies	3200 m 10,499 ft	1530 m 5,020 ft	14.14 km 8.79 mi	54.0580°N 120.3268°W
31	Mount Joffre (Note: Mount Joffre is the easternmost summit of its elevation in Canada.)	Alberta; British Columbia	Canadian Rockies	3433 m 11,263 ft	1505 m 4,938 ft	49.2 km 30.6 mi	50.5285°N 115.2069°W
32	Mount Clemenceau (Note: The summit of Mount Clemenceau is the highest point of the Clémenceau Icefield.)	British Columbia	Canadian Rockies	3664 m 12,021 ft	1494 m 4,902 ft	35.9 km 22.3 mi	52.2475°N 117.9578°W
33	Mount Brazeau	Alberta	Canadian Rockies	3525 m 11,565 ft	1475 m 4,839 ft	30.8 km 19.14 mi	52.5515°N 117.3549°W
34	Culebra Peak	Colorado	Culebra Range	4283 m 14,053 ft	1471 m 4,827 ft	56.9 km 35.4 mi	37.1224°N 105.1858°W
35	Granite Peak	Montana	Beartooth Mountains	3903.5 m 12,807 ft	1457 m 4,779 ft	138.5 km 86 mi	45.1634°N 109.8075°W
36	Sentinel Peak (Note: The summit of Sentinel Peak is the highest point of the Murray Range.) (Note: Sentinel Peak is the northernmost and westernmost 2000-meter (6562-foot) summit of the Rocky Mountains.)	British Columbia	Canadian Rockies	2513 m 8,245 ft	1452 m 4,764 ft	86.6 km 53.8 mi	54.9080°N 121.9610°W
37	Crestone Peak	Colorado	Sangre de Cristo Range	4359 m 14,300 ft	1388 m 4,554 ft	44 km 27.4 mi	37.9669°N 105.5855°W
38	Table Mountain (Note: The summit of Table Mountain is the highest point of the Highland Mountains.) (Note: The elevation of Table Mountain includes an adjustment of +1.467 m (4.81 ft) from NGVD 29 to NAVD 88.)	Montana	Highland Mountains	3117 m 10,228 ft	1348 m 4,422 ft	31.1 km 19.3 mi	45.7426°N 112.4619°W
39	Mount Stimson	Montana	Lewis Range	3092.6 m 10,146 ft	1342 m 4,402 ft	48.3 km 30 mi	48.5142°N 113.6104°W
40	Kintla Peak (Note: The summit of Kintla Peak is the highest point of the Livingston Range.) (Note: The elevation of Kintla Peak includes an adjustment of +1.413 m (4.64 ft) from NGVD 29 to NAVD 88.)	Montana	Livingston Range	3080 m 10,106 ft	1341 m 4,401 ft	23.8 km 14.78 mi	48.9437°N 114.1714°W
41	Uncompahgre Peak	Colorado	San Juan Mountains	4365 m 14,321 ft	1304 m 4,277 ft	136.8 km 85 mi	38.0717°N 107.4621°W
42	Mount Edith (Note: The summit of Mount Edith is the highest point of the Big Belt Mountains.) (Note: The elevation of Mount Edith includes an adjustment of +1.249 m (4.1 ft) from NGVD 29 to NAVD 88.)	Montana	Big Belt Mountains	2897 m 9,504 ft	1253 m 4,110 ft	59.5 km 37 mi	46.4318°N 111.1862°W
43	Hilgard Peak (Note: The summit of Hilgard Peak is the highest point of the Madison Range.) (Note: The elevation of Hilgard Peak includes an adjustment of +1.49 m (4.89 ft) from NGVD 29 to NAVD 88.)	Montana	Madison Range	3451 m 11,321 ft	1238 m 4,063 ft	123 km 76.4 mi	44.9166°N 111.4593°W
44	Francs Peak	Wyoming	Absaroka Range	4012.3 m 13,164 ft	1236 m 4,056 ft	76 km 47.2 mi	43.9613°N 109.3392°W
45	Flat Top Mountain	Colorado	Flat Tops	3767.7 m 12,361 ft	1236 m 4,054 ft	65.6 km 40.8 mi	40.0147°N 107.0833°W
46	Castle Peak (Note: The summit of Castle Peak is the highest point of the White Cloud Mountains.)	Idaho	White Cloud Mountains	3600.4 m 11,812 ft	1230 m 4,035 ft	44 km 27.3 mi	44.0402°N 114.5887°W
47	Mount Wilson	Colorado	San Miguel Mountains	4344 m 14,252 ft	1227 m 4,024 ft	53.1 km 33 mi	37.8391°N 107.9916°W
48	Truchas Peak	New Mexico	Santa Fe Mountains	3995.2 m 13,108 ft	1220 m 4,001 ft	68.2 km 42.3 mi	35.9625°N 105.6450°W
49	West Goat Peak (Note: The summit of West Goat Peak is the highest point of the Anaconda Range.) (Note: The elevation of West Goat Peak includes an adjustment of +1.52 m (4.99 ft) from NGVD 29 to NAVD 88.)	Montana	Anaconda Range	3291 m 10,798 ft	1211 m 3,973 ft	62.9 km 39.1 mi	45.9625°N 113.3949°W
50	Hollowtop Mountain (Note: The summit of Hollowtop Mountain is the highest point of the Tobacco Root Mountains.) (Note: The elevation of Hollowtop Mountain includes an adjustment of +1.486 m (4.88 ft) from NGVD 29 to NAVD 88.)	Montana	Tobacco Root Mountains	3234 m 10,609 ft	1190 m 3,904 ft	54.8 km 34 mi	45.6116°N 112.0083°W

== Most isolated major summits ==
Of the 50 most isolated major summits of the Rocky Mountains, only Mount Elbert exceeds 1000 kilometers (621.37 miles) of topographic isolation, six peaks exceed 200 kilometers (124.27 miles), 19 peaks exceed 100 kilometers (62.14 miles), and all 50 peaks exceed 52 kilometers (32.31 miles) of topographic isolation.

Of these 50 peaks, 17 are located in Montana, ten in Colorado, nine in Wyoming, six in British Columbia, five in Utah, two in Alberta, two in New Mexico, and one in Idaho. Two of these peaks lie on the Alberta-British Columbia border.

The 50 most topographically isolated summits of the Rocky Mountains with at least 500 meters of topographic prominence
Rank	Mountain peak	Region	Mountain range	Elevation	Prominence	Isolation	Location
1	Mount Elbert	Colorado	Sawatch Range	4401.2 m 14,440 ft	2772 m 9,093 ft	1,079 km 671 mi	39.1178°N 106.4454°W
2	Gannett Peak	Wyoming	Wind River Range	4209.1 m 13,809 ft	2157 m 7,076 ft	467 km 290 mi	43.1842°N 109.6542°W
3	Mount Robson	British Columbia	Canadian Rockies	3959 m 12,989 ft	2829 m 9,281 ft	460 km 286 mi	53.1105°N 119.1566°W
4	Kings Peak	Utah	Uinta Mountains	4125 m 13,534 ft	1938 m 6,358 ft	268 km 166.6 mi	40.7763°N 110.3729°W
5	Borah Peak	Idaho	Lost River Range	3861.2 m 12,668 ft	1829 m 6,002 ft	243 km 150.8 mi	44.1374°N 113.7811°W
6	Cloud Peak	Wyoming	Bighorn Mountains	4013.3 m 13,167 ft	2157 m 7,077 ft	233 km 145 mi	44.3821°N 107.1739°W
7	Blanca Peak	Colorado	Sangre de Cristo Mountains	4374 m 14,351 ft	1623 m 5,326 ft	166.4 km 103.4 mi	37.5775°N 105.4856°W
8	Mount Cleveland	Montana	Lewis Range	3194 m 10,479 ft	1599 m 5,246 ft	159.9 km 99.4 mi	48.9249°N 113.8482°W
9	Mount Columbia	Alberta; British Columbia	Canadian Rockies	3741 m 12,274 ft	2371 m 7,779 ft	158 km 98.2 mi	52.1473°N 117.4416°W
10	Mount Assiniboine	Alberta; British Columbia	Canadian Rockies	3616 m 11,864 ft	2082 m 6,831 ft	141.8 km 88.1 mi	50.8696°N 115.6509°W
11	Granite Peak	Montana	Beartooth Mountains	3903.5 m 12,807 ft	1457 m 4,779 ft	138.5 km 86 mi	45.1634°N 109.8075°W
12	Uncompahgre Peak	Colorado	San Juan Mountains	4365 m 14,321 ft	1304 m 4,277 ft	136.8 km 85 mi	38.0717°N 107.4621°W
13	Snowshoe Peak	Montana	Cabinet Mountains	2665 m 8,743 ft	1658 m 5,438 ft	133.5 km 82.9 mi	48.2231°N 115.6890°W
14	McDonald Peak	Montana	Mission Range	2994 m 9,824 ft	1722 m 5,650 ft	127.8 km 79.4 mi	47.3826°N 113.9191°W
15	Hilgard Peak	Montana	Madison Range	3451 m 11,321 ft	1238 m 4,063 ft	123 km 76.4 mi	44.9166°N 111.4593°W
16	Mount Nebo	Utah	Wasatch Range	3637 m 11,933 ft	1679 m 5,508 ft	121.6 km 75.6 mi	39.8219°N 111.7603°W
17	Tweedy Mountain (Note: The summit of Tweedy Mountain is the highest point of the Pioneer Mountains.) (Note: The elevation of Tweedy Mountain includes an adjustment of +1.598 m (5.24 ft) from NGVD 29 to NAVD 88.)	Montana	Pioneer Mountains	3401 m 11,159 ft	1163 m 3,814 ft	120.7 km 75 mi	45.4805°N 112.9655°W
18	Grand Teton	Wyoming	Teton Range	4198.7 m 13,775 ft	1995 m 6,545 ft	111.6 km 69.4 mi	43.7412°N 110.8024°W
19	Laramie Peak	Wyoming	Laramie Mountains	3132 m 10,276 ft	1011 m 3,317 ft	108.4 km 67.4 mi	42.2681°N 105.4425°W
20	Naomi Peak (Note: The summit of Naomi Peak is the highest point of the Bear River Mountains.)	Utah	Wasatch Range	3043 m 9,984 ft	966 m 3,169 ft	98.9 km 61.5 mi	41.9114°N 111.6754°W
21	Pikes Peak	Colorado	Front Range	4302.31 m 14,115 ft	1686 m 5,530 ft	97.6 km 60.6 mi	38.8405°N 105.0442°W
22	Ferris Mountain (Note: The summit of Ferris Mountain is the highest point of the Ferris Mountains.)	Wyoming	Ferris Mountains	3069.6 m 10,071 ft	1000 m 3,282 ft	89 km 55.3 mi	42.2566°N 107.2394°W
23	Mount Sir Alexander	British Columbia	Canadian Rockies	3275 m 10,745 ft	1762 m 5,781 ft	87.8 km 54.5 mi	53.9360°N 120.3869°W
24	Sentinel Peak	British Columbia	Canadian Rockies	2513 m 8,245 ft	1452 m 4,764 ft	86.6 km 53.8 mi	54.9080°N 121.9610°W
25	Red Mountain (Note: The summit of Red Mountain is the highest point of the Flathead Range.)	Montana	Flathead Range	2869.1 m 9,413 ft	1159 m 3,801 ft	84.3 km 52.4 mi	47.1166°N 112.7388°W
26	Wyoming Peak (Note: The summit of Wyoming Peak is the highest point of the Wyoming Range.)	Wyoming	Wyoming Range	3481.6 m 11,423 ft	1084 m 3,558 ft	81.8 km 50.8 mi	42.6043°N 110.6238°W
27	Rocky Mountain (Note: The summit of Rocky Mountain is the highest point of the Rocky Mountain Front.)	Montana	Rocky Mountain Front	2864.4 m 9,398 ft	991 m 3,252 ft	77.4 km 48.1 mi	47.8123°N 112.8003°W
28	Francs Peak	Wyoming	Absaroka Range	4012.3 m 13,164 ft	1236 m 4,056 ft	76 km 47.2 mi	43.9613°N 109.3392°W
29	Big Baldy Mountain (Note: The summit of Big Baldy Mountain is the highest point of the Little Belt Mountains.) (Note: The elevation of Big Baldy Mountain includes an adjustment of +1.183 m (3.88 ft) from NGVD 29 to NAVD 88.)	Montana	Little Belt Mountains	2798 m 9,181 ft	1087 m 3,567 ft	73.6 km 45.8 mi	46.9685°N 110.6064°W
30	Crazy Peak	Montana	Crazy Mountains	3418 m 11,214 ft	1743 m 5,719 ft	71.8 km 44.6 mi	46.0181°N 110.2768°W
31	Longs Peak	Colorado	Front Range	4346 m 14,259 ft	896 m 2,940 ft	70.2 km 43.6 mi	40.2550°N 105.6151°W
32	Truchas Peak	New Mexico	Santa Fe Mountains	3995.2 m 13,108 ft	1220 m 4,001 ft	68.2 km 42.3 mi	35.9625°N 105.6450°W
33	Flat Top Mountain	Colorado	Flat Tops	3767.7 m 12,361 ft	1236 m 4,054 ft	65.6 km 40.8 mi	40.0147°N 107.0833°W
34	Trapper Peak (Note: The summit of Trapper Peak is the highest point of the central Bitterroot Range.) (Note: The elevation of Trapper Peak includes an adjustment of +1.367 m (4.48 ft) from NGVD 29 to NAVD 88.)	Montana	Bitterroot Range	3097 m 10,162 ft	1088 m 3,570 ft	65.6 km 40.8 mi	45.8898°N 114.2978°W
35	Medicine Bow Peak (Note: The summit of Medicine Bow Peak is the highest point of the Snowy Range.)	Wyoming	Medicine Bow Mountains	3662.4 m 12,016 ft	988 m 3,243 ft	65.4 km 40.6 mi	41.3603°N 106.3176°W
36	Mount Goodsir	British Columbia	Canadian Rockies	3567 m 11,703 ft	1917 m 6,289 ft	64.1 km 39.8 mi	51.2021°N 116.3975°W
37	Mount Timpanogos	Utah	Wasatch Range	3582 m 11,752 ft	1609 m 5,279 ft	63.8 km 39.6 mi	40.3908°N 111.6459°W
38	Summit Peak	Colorado	San Juan Mountains	4056.2 m 13,308 ft	841 m 2,760 ft	63.7 km 39.6 mi	37.3506°N 106.6968°W
39	Willard Peak (Note: The summit of Willard Peak is the highest point of the northern Wasatch Range.)	Utah	Wasatch Range	2978.1 m 9,771 ft	995 m 3,263 ft	63.5 km 39.4 mi	41.3828°N 111.9746°W
40	West Goat Peak	Montana	Anaconda Range	3291 m 10,798 ft	1211 m 3,973 ft	62.9 km 39.1 mi	45.9625°N 113.3949°W
41	Mount Zirkel (Note: The summit of Mount Zirkel is the highest point of the Park Range.) (Note: The elevation of Mount Zirkel includes an adjustment of +1.632 m (5.35 ft) from NGVD 29 to NAVD 88.)	Colorado	Park Range	3714 m 12,185 ft	1058 m 3,470 ft	60.6 km 37.7 mi	40.8313°N 106.6631°W
42	Wheeler Peak	New Mexico	Taos Mountains	4013.3 m 13,167 ft	1039 m 3,409 ft	59.6 km 37 mi	36.5569°N 105.4169°W
43	Mount Edith	Montana	Big Belt Mountains	2897 m 9,504 ft	1253 m 4,110 ft	59.5 km 37 mi	46.4318°N 111.1862°W
44	Homer Youngs Peak (Note: The summit of Homer Youngs Peak is the highest point of the West Big Hole Mountains.) (Note: The elevation of Homer Youngs Peak includes an adjustment of +1.483 m (4.87 ft) from NGVD 29 to NAVD 88.)	Montana	Bitterroot Range	3239 m 10,626 ft	976 m 3,201 ft	57.2 km 35.5 mi	45.3111°N 113.6773°W
45	Culebra Peak	Colorado	Culebra Range	4283 m 14,053 ft	1471 m 4,827 ft	56.9 km 35.4 mi	37.1224°N 105.1858°W
46	Wind River Peak	Wyoming	Wind River Range	4022.4 m 13,197 ft	784 m 2,572 ft	56.6 km 35.1 mi	42.7085°N 109.1284°W
47	Hollowtop Mountain	Montana	Tobacco Root Mountains	3234 m 10,609 ft	1190 m 3,904 ft	54.8 km 34 mi	45.6116°N 112.0083°W
48	Mount Wilson	Colorado	San Miguel Mountains	4344 m 14,252 ft	1227 m 4,024 ft	53.1 km 33 mi	37.8391°N 107.9916°W
49	Crow Peak (Note: The summit of Crow Peak is the highest point of the Elkhorn Mountains.) (Note: The elevation of Crow Peak includes an adjustment of +1.353 m (4.44 ft) from NGVD 29 to NAVD 88.)	Montana	Elkhorn Mountains	2871 m 9,418 ft	1160 m 3,805 ft	53 km 32.9 mi	46.2940°N 111.9037°W
50	Mount Harrison	British Columbia	Canadian Rockies	3360 m 11,024 ft	1770 m 5,807 ft	52.1 km 32.4 mi	50.0604°N 115.2057°W

== See also ==
- Rocky Mountains
  - List of mountain peaks of the Rocky Mountains
    - List of extreme summits of the Rocky Mountains
- List of mountain peaks of North America
  - List of mountain peaks of Greenland
  - List of mountain peaks of Canada
  - List of mountain peaks of the United States
    - List of mountain peaks of Colorado
    - List of mountain peaks of Idaho
    - List of mountain peaks of Montana
    - List of mountain peaks of New Mexico
    - List of mountain peaks of Utah
    - List of mountain peaks of Wyoming
  - List of mountain peaks of México
  - List of mountain peaks of Central America
  - List of mountain peaks of the Caribbean
- Physical geography
  - Topography
    - Topographic elevation
    - Topographic prominence
    - Topographic isolation
