= Mount Elbert =

Highest mountain in Colorado, United States

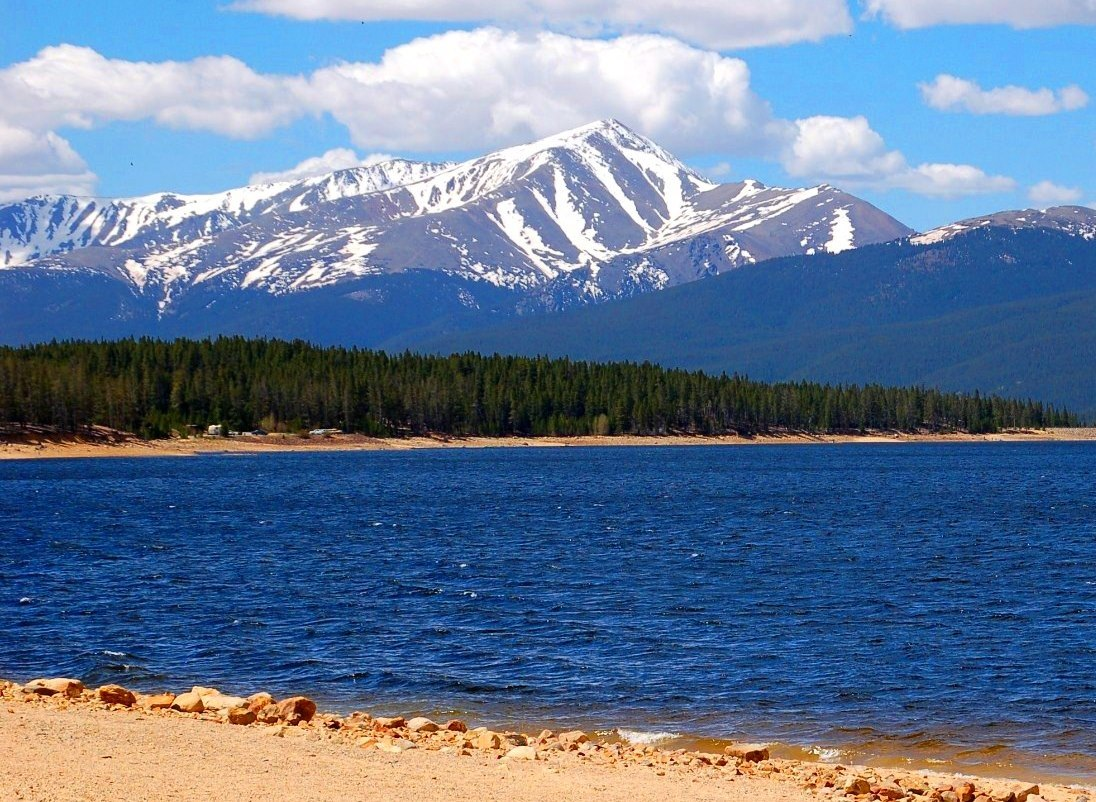
- Mount Elbert seen from Turquoise Lake

Highest point
- Elevation: 14,440 ft (4,400 m); NAVD 88; NAPGD2022 (preliminary)
- Prominence: 9,093 feet (2772 m)
- Isolation: 671 miles (1079 km)
- Listing: North America highest peaks 27th; North America prominent peaks 23rd; North America isolated peaks 8th; US highest major peaks 14th; U.S. state high points 3rd; Colorado highest major peaks 1st; Colorado fourteeners 1st; Colorado county high points 1st
- Coordinates: 39°7′4″N 106°26′43″W

Naming
- Etymology: Samuel Hitt Elbert

Geography
- Location within Colorado
- Location: High point of Lake County and the State of Colorado, U.S.
- Parent range: Highest summit of the Rocky Mountains, Southern Rocky Mountains, Sawatch Range, and Elbert Massif
- Topo map(s): USGS 7.5' topographic map Mount Elbert, Colorado

Climbing
- First ascent: 1874 by Henry W. Stuckle
- Easiest route: Northeast Ridge: Hike, class 1

Mount Elbert is the highest summit of the Rocky Mountains of North America. With an elevation of 14,440 ft (4,400 m), it is also the highest point in the U.S. state of Colorado and the second-highest summit in the contiguous United States after Mount Whitney, which is slightly taller. The ultra-prominent fourteener is the highest peak in the Sawatch Range, as well as the highest point in the entire Mississippi River drainage basin. Mount Elbert is located in San Isabel National Forest, 12.1 mi (19.4 km) southwest (bearing 223°) of the city of Leadville in Lake County, Colorado. (Note: The elevation of Mount Elbert includes an adjustment of +1.995 m (+6.55 ft) from NGVD 29 to NAVD 88.)

The mountain was named in honor of a Colorado statesman, Samuel Hitt Elbert, who was active in the formative period of the state, and governor of the Territory of Colorado in 1873-1874. Henry W. Stuckle of the Hayden Survey was the first to record an ascent of the peak, in 1874. The easiest and most popular climbing routes are categorized as Class 1 to 2 or A+ in mountaineering parlance. Mount Elbert is therefore often referred to as the "gentle giant" that tops all others in the Rocky Mountains.

== Geography ==
Mount Elbert is visible to the southwest of Leadville, often snow-capped even in the summer. Many other fourteeners surround Elbert in all directions, and it is very close to central Colorado's Collegiate Peaks. The neighboring Mount Massive, to the north, is the second-highest peak in the Rocky Mountains and the third-highest in the contiguous United States, and La Plata Peak, to the south, is the fifth-highest in the Rockies. The community of Twin Lakes lies at the base of Mount Elbert, Denver is about 130 miles (209 km) to the east, Vail is 50 miles (80 km) to the north, and Aspen is 40 miles (64 km) to the west. Leadville, about 16 miles (26 km) to the northeast, is the nearest large town. Elbert's parent peak is Mount Whitney in California. Including Alaska and Hawaii, Mount Elbert is the fourteenth-highest mountain in the United States.

=== Climate ===
Weather conditions often change rapidly, and afternoon thunderstorms are common in the summertime; hailstorms and snow are possible year-round. One thunderstorm on the mountain's summit was considered remarkable enough to be reported in the July 1894 issue of Science.

Climate data for Mount Elbert 39.1170 N, 106.4402 W, Elevation: 14,019 ft (4,273 m) (1991–2020 normals)
Month	Jan	Feb	Mar	Apr	May	Jun	Jul	Aug	Sep	Oct	Nov	Dec	Year
Mean daily maximum °F (°C)	19.5 (−6.9)	18.7 (−7.4)	23.7 (−4.6)	29.3 (−1.5)	38.1 (3.4)	49.7 (9.8)	55.9 (13.3)	53.9 (12.2)	47.4 (8.6)	36.6 (2.6)	25.8 (−3.4)	19.7 (−6.8)	34.9 (1.6)
Daily mean °F (°C)	7.9 (−13.4)	6.7 (−14.1)	11.3 (−11.5)	16.2 (−8.8)	24.9 (−3.9)	35.5 (1.9)	41.7 (5.4)	40.2 (4.6)	33.9 (1.1)	24.1 (−4.4)	14.8 (−9.6)	8.5 (−13.1)	22.1 (−5.5)
Mean daily minimum °F (°C)	−3.6 (−19.8)	−5.2 (−20.7)	−1.2 (−18.4)	3.1 (−16.1)	11.8 (−11.2)	21.3 (−5.9)	27.5 (−2.5)	26.6 (−3.0)	20.4 (−6.4)	11.7 (−11.3)	3.8 (−15.7)	−2.7 (−19.3)	9.5 (−12.5)
Average precipitation inches (mm)	4.26 (108)	4.07 (103)	4.39 (112)	5.39 (137)	3.89 (99)	1.65 (42)	2.18 (55)	2.42 (61)	2.65 (67)	3.29 (84)	4.08 (104)	3.78 (96)	42.05 (1,068)
Source: PRISM Climate Group

== Geology ==
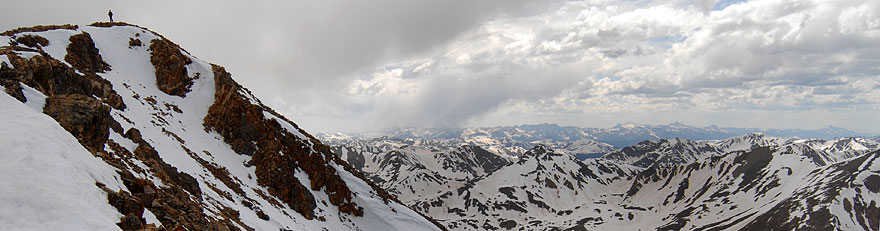
Panoramic view of Mount Elbert in June 2008

Mount Elbert is part of the Sawatch Range, an uplift of the Laramide Orogeny which separated from the Mosquito Range to the east around 28 million years ago. The tops of this range were heavily glaciated, leaving behind characteristic summit features and other such clues. For example, the base of Elbert on the eastern side exhibits expanses of igneous and metamorphic rocks exposed when the glaciers receded, leaving a lateral moraine. Further up the eastern side there is a large cirque with a small tarn. There are also lakes to both the north and south, Turquoise and Twin Lakes respectively; the Twin Lakes are a result of the natural dam of end moraines, and Turquoise Lake was created by the manmade Sugar Loaf Dam.

Mount Elbert is composed largely of quartzite. However, the summit ridge consists of metamorphic basement rock, which is Pre-Cambrian in origin and about 1.7 billion years old. There are various igneous intrusions including pegmatite, as well as bands of gneiss and schist. Unlike mountains of similar altitude elsewhere, Elbert lacks both a permanent snowpack and a prominent north-facing cirque, which can be attributed to its position among other mountains of similar height, causing it to receive relatively small quantities of precipitation.

== History ==
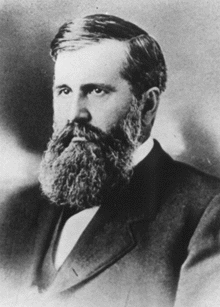
Mount Elbert was named after Samuel Hitt Elbert

Mount Elbert was named by miners in honor of Samuel Hitt Elbert, the governor of the then-Territory of Colorado, because he brokered a treaty in September 1873 with the Ute tribe that opened up more than 3,000,000 acres (12,000 km^{2}) of reservation land to mining and railroad activity. The first recorded ascent of the peak was by H.W. Stuckle in 1874, who was surveying the mountain as part of the Hayden Survey.

Originally measured as 14,433 feet (4,399 m) in height, Mount Elbert's elevation was later adjusted to 14,440 feet (4,400 m) following a re-evaluation of mapped elevations, which sparked protests. The actual change was made in 1988 as a result of the North American Vertical Datum of 1988; it seems the original measurement resulted from the Sea Level Datum of 1929. A matter of some contention arose after the Great Depression over the heights of Elbert and its neighbor Mount Massive, which differ in elevation by only 12 feet (3.7 m). This led to an ongoing dispute that came to a head with the Mount Massive supporters building large piles of stones on the summit to boost its height, only to have the Mount Elbert proponents demolish them. The effort was ultimately unsuccessful and Mount Elbert has remained the highest peak in Colorado. The first motorized ascent of Elbert occurred in 1949, when a Jeep was driven to the summit, apparently to judge suitability for skiing development.

== Flora and fauna ==
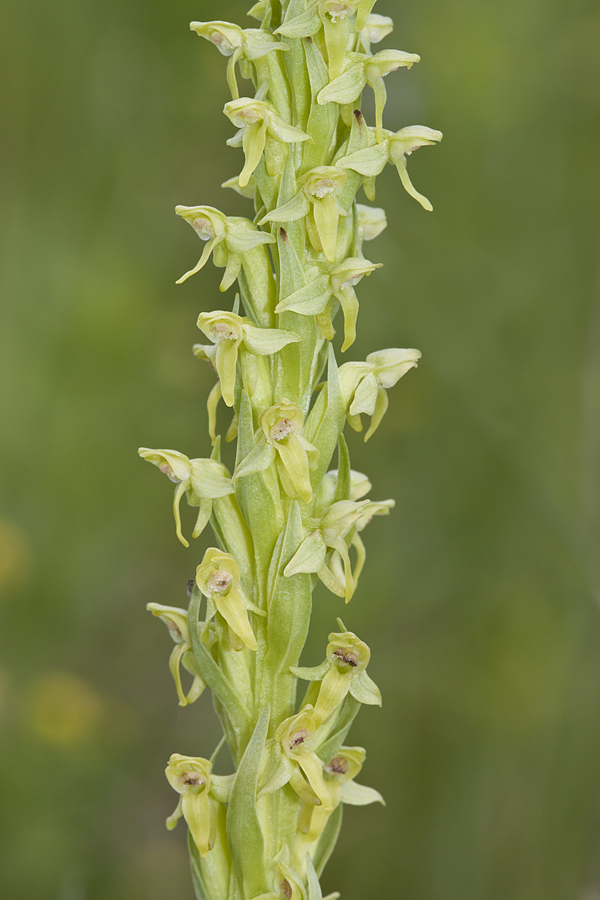
Platanthera hyperborea

The summit of Mount Elbert is an alpine environment, featuring plants such as Phacelia sericea (silky phacelia), Hymenoxys grandiflora (old-man-of-the-mountain), and Geum rossii (alpine avens). Also noted are Carex atrata var. pullata, Salix desertorum, Platanthera hyperborea, Thalictrum fendleri, Aquilegia canadensis, Chenopodium album, Gentiana detonsa var. hallii, and Bigelovia parryi. Below treeline the mountain is heavily forested, with the lower slopes covered with a mixture of lodgepole pine, spruce, aspen, and fir.

Some of the fauna reported on the climb to the summit include black bears, marmots, mule deer, pikas, and pocket gophers; there are also many species of birds. Elk, grouse, turkey, and bighorn sheep are present in the area during the summer. Grizzly bears are extirpated.

== Hiking ==
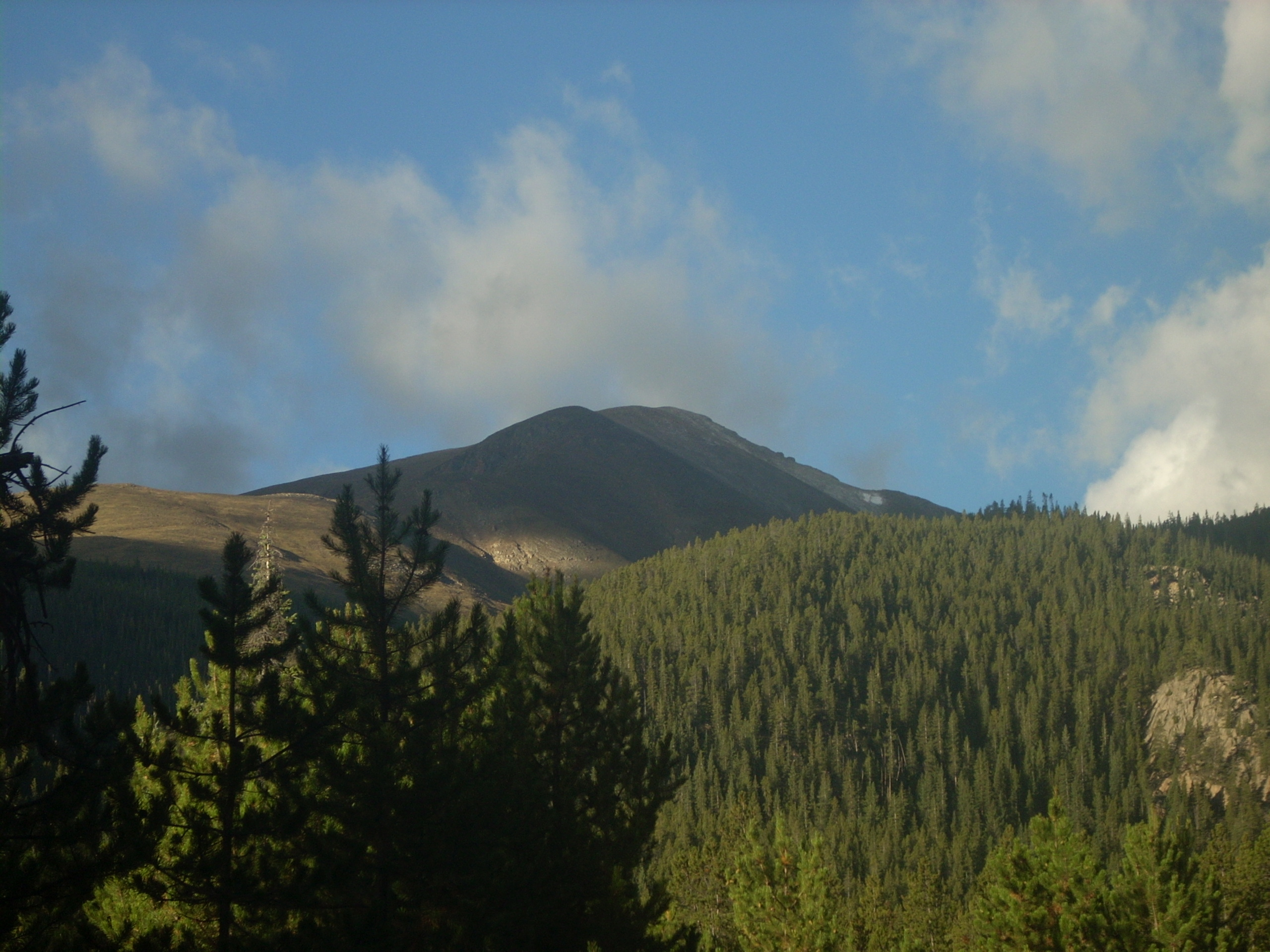
The north-east ridge

There are three main routes to ascend the mountain, all of which gain over 4,100 feet (1,200 m) elevation. The standard route ascends the peak from the east, starting from the Colorado Trail just north of Twin Lakes. The 4.6 miles (7.4 km) long North (Main) Elbert Trail begins close to the Elbert Creek Campground, and gains about 4,500 feet (1,400 m). The trail is open to equestrians, mountain bikers and hunters during season. An easier, but longer route, the South Elbert Trail, is 5.5 miles (8.9 km) long, climbing 4,600 feet (1,400 m) at a less-punishing gradient than the North Elbert Trail, approaching from the south and then climbing the eastern ridge.

The most difficult of the main routes is the Black Cloud Trail, a Class 2 climb that takes ten to fourteen hours depending on pace, gains 5,300 feet (1,600 m) in elevation, and also involves an ascent of the sub-peak, South Elbert, at 14,134 feet (4,308 m). Even healthy and experienced climbers report great difficulty on this route, and despite the fact that there is a trail, the route is extremely steep, unstable, and rocky in places. The elevation gain is not evenly distributed over the 5.5-mile ascent. There are also routes approaching from the western face, and southwestern ridge, from South Halfmoon Creek Trailhead and Echo Canyon Trailhead respectively.

Although strenuous and requiring physical fitness, none of the conventional routes require specialist mountaineering skills or technical rock climbing. The main dangers of the mountain are those common to all high mountains, particularly altitude sickness. This can affect anyone, even those who are acclimatized. In serious cases, it can lead to high-altitude pulmonary edema and cerebral edema, which can lead to difficulties with breathing, paralysis, and death. Climbers are advised to begin their ascent at or before 6 A.M. and to summit and descend before early afternoon to minimize exposure to possible afternoon thunderstorms while at high altitudes. Although the most conventional form of ascent is by hiking, Anna Elizabeth Dickinson, the orator, ascended the mountain on a mule borrowed from the U.S. government.

== See also ==
- List of mountain peaks of North America
  - List of mountain peaks of the United States
    - List of mountain peaks of Colorado
      - List of Colorado county high points
      - List of Colorado fourteeners
- List of U.S. states by elevation
- List of the highest major summits of the United States
- List of the most prominent summits of the United States
- List of the most isolated major summits of the United States

== Bibliography ==
- Dziezynski, James (August 7, 2012). Best Summit Hikes in Colorado: An Opinionated Guide to 50+ Ascents of Classic and Little-Known Peaks from 8,144 to 14,433 Feet. Wilderness Press. ISBN 978-0-89997-713-3.
- Enright, Kelly (2009). America's Natural Places: Rocky Mountains and Great Plains. ABC-CLIO. ISBN 978-0-313-35315-4.
- Gallman, J. Matthew (March 15, 2006). America's Joan of Arc : The Life of Anna Elizabeth Dickinson: The Life of Anna Elizabeth Dickinson. Oxford University Press. p. 129. ISBN 978-0-19-803654-8.
- Gaug, Maryann (May 17, 2011). Hiking Colorado, 3rd. Globe Pequot. ISBN 978-0-7627-6880-6.
- Helman, Adam (2005). The Finest Peaks - Prominence and Other Mountain Measures. Trafford Publishing. ISBN 978-1-4120-5995-4.
- Holmes, Don W. (1990). Highpoints of the United States. Cordillera Press. ISBN 978-0-917895-33-3.
- Hopkins, Ralph Lee; Hopkins, Lindy Birkel (2000). Hiking Colorado's Geology. The Mountaineers Books. ISBN 978-1-59485-307-4.
- Kelsey, Michael R. (2001). Climber's and Hiker's Guide to the World's Mountains and Volcanos (4th ed.). Provo, Utah: Kelsey Publishing. ISBN 978-0-944510-18-6.
- Porter, Thomas Conrad; Coulter, John Merle (1874). Synopsis of the Flora of Colorado (Public domain ed.). U.S. Government Printing Office. p. 128.
- Roach, Gerry (April 1, 1999). Colorado's Fourteeners: From Hikes to Climbs (2 ed.). Fulcrum Publishing. ISBN 978-1-55591-412-7.
- Vetter, Jeremy (2011). Knowing Global Environments: New Historical Perspectives on the Field Sciences. Rutgers University Press. ISBN 978-0-8135-4875-3.
