= Ben Lomond Mountain (Utah) =

Mountain in the American state of Utah

Ben Lomond
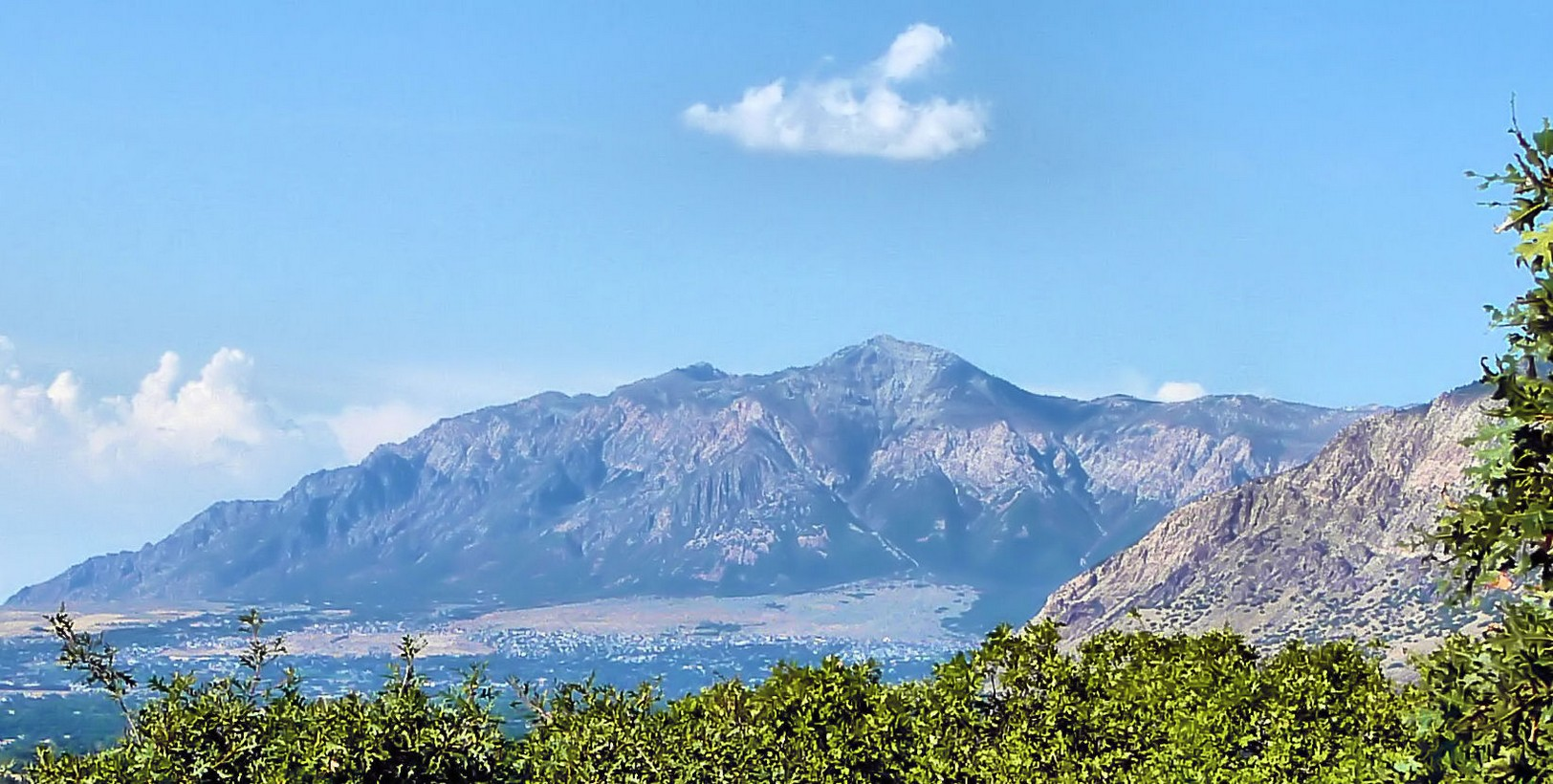

Highest point
- Elevation: 9,716 ft (2,961 m) NAVD 88
- Prominence: 471 ft (144 m)
- Coordinates: 41°21′48″N 111°57′38″W

Geography
- Location: Weber County, Utah, U.S.
- Parent range: Wasatch Range
- Topo map: USGS North Ogden

Climbing
- Easiest route: Hike

Ben Lomond, just north of Ogden, Utah, is a peak in the northern portion of the Wasatch Mountains. A popular trail passes over its summit (elevation 9,716 feet (2,961 m)), accessible from four different trailheads to the north, south, and east.

It is often incorrectly referred to by locals as Ben Lomond Peak, Mt. Ben Lomond, or Ben Lomond Mountain. The usage Mount Ben Lomond is technically a redundancy since the prefix Ben – added to many Scottish mountains including Ben Lomond after which this mountain was named – actually means mount. That is why Scottish mountains whose names begin with Ben are never preceded by Mount. The United States Geological Survey labels it as Ben Lomond on its maps.

Ben Lomond stands out along the Wasatch Front because the mountain range appears to run east and west along the Wasatch Range, while most mountains appear to run south and north. Two miles northwest of Ben Lomond is Willard Peak, with an elevation of 9,763 feet (2,976 m). Northwest of Willard Peak is Inspiration Point. A dirt road travels 14 miles (23 km) from Mantua, Utah to Inspiration Point. The road is usually not passable until July due to deep snow that resists melting due to the area's northern exposure. Atop Inspiration Point on a clear day, one can see Salt Lake City to the south, Willard Bay and the Great Salt Lake to the west, and the city of Logan, Utah to the northeast.

From Inspiration Peak one can hike or bike to the summit of Ben Lomond, and then continue east to a trailhead on North Ogden Pass. The trail is listed as one of the top mountain bike rides in Utah. The distance from the North Ogden trailhead to the summit of Ben Lomond is approximately 9 miles (14 km).

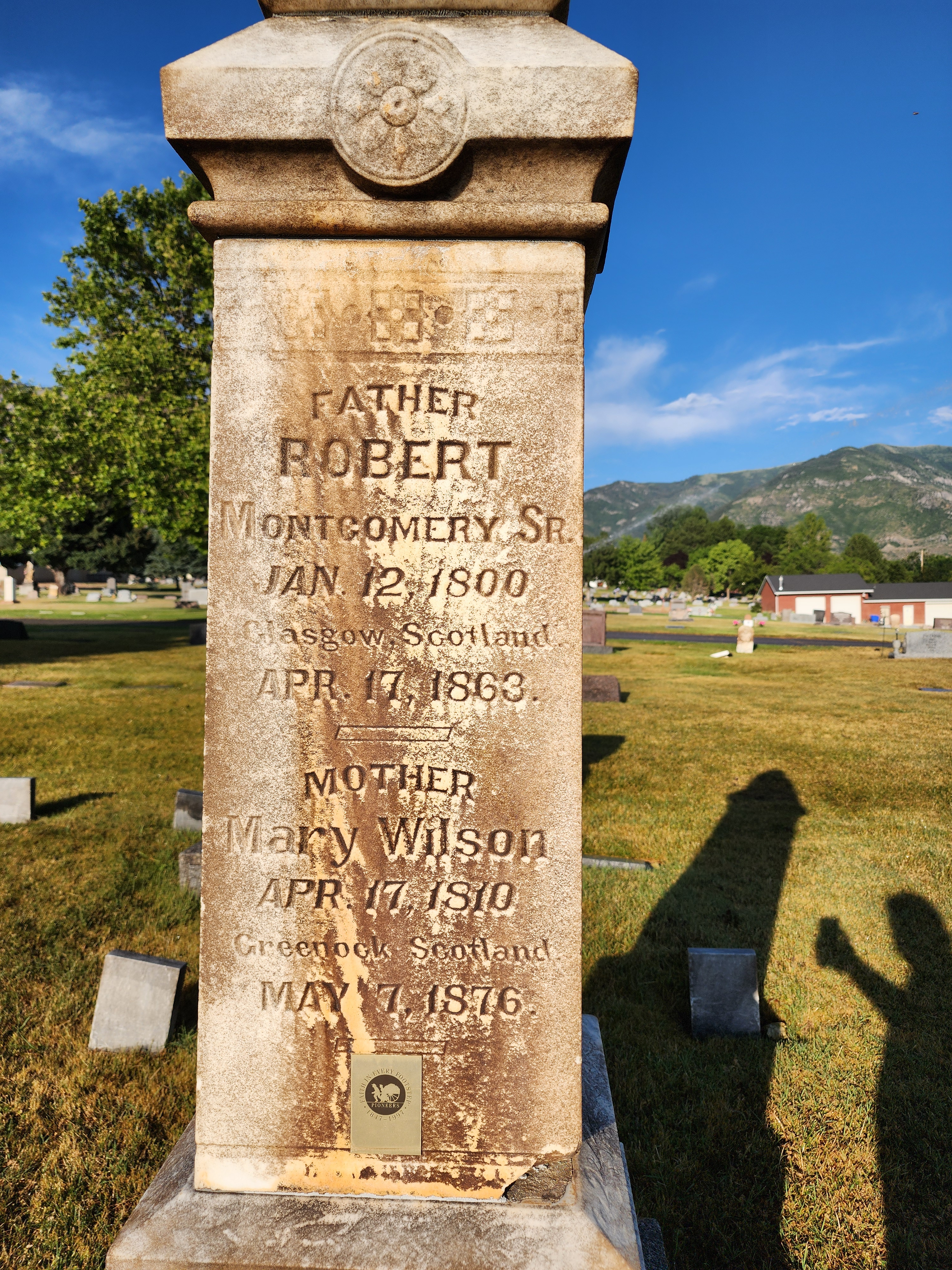
Grave of Robert Montgomery in Ben Lomond Cemetery, North Ogden

Ben Lomond was named after the mountain Ben Lomond in the Scottish Highlands. In an Ogden, Utah Standard-Examiner article, published on November 15, 1930, the Ogden Forest Service credits Robert Montgomery, from Glasgow, Scotland, with naming the mountain.

== Paramount Pictures logo ==
The Paramount Pictures logo was possibly modeled after Ben Lomond. William W. Hodkinson, the co-founder of Paramount and a native of the Ogden area, allegedly drew the initial version of the logo – Ben Lomond, drawn from memory, with a border of stars, which later became a partial circle surrounding the mountain – on a napkin during a meeting in 1914.
