= Willard Peak =

Mountain in Box Elder and Weber counties in Utah, United States

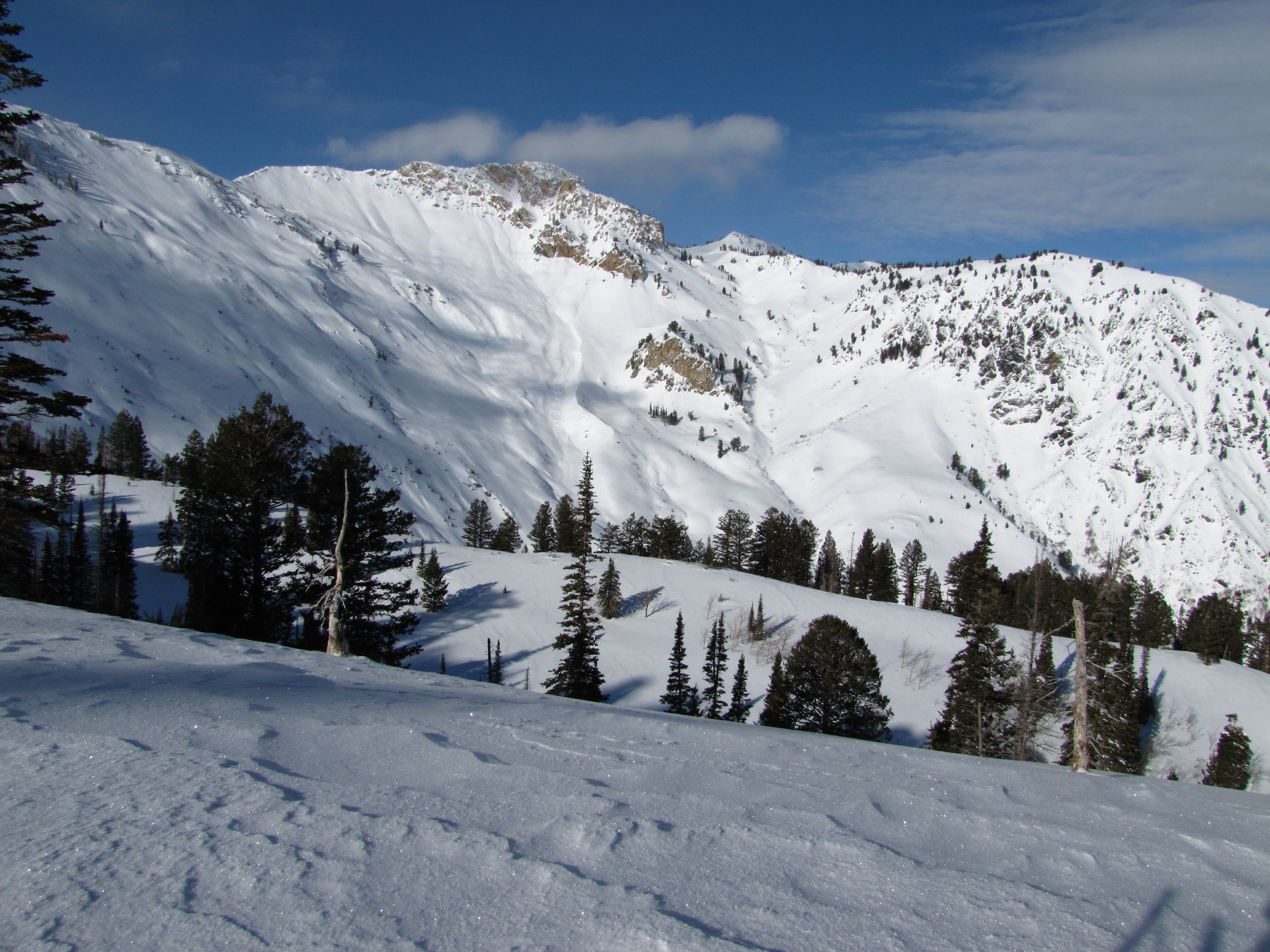
- Southeast aspect

Highest point
- Elevation: 9,763 ft (2,976 m)
- Prominence: 3,243 ft (988 m)
- Parent peak: Doubletop Mountain (9,873 ft)
- Isolation: 39.7 mi (63.9 km)
- Coordinates: 41°22′58″N 111°58′28″W

Naming
- Etymology: Willard Richards

Geography
- Location within Utah Location within the United States
- Country: United States of America
- State: Utah
- County: Box Elder / Weber
- Parent range: Wasatch Range; Rocky Mountains
- Topo map: USGS Mantua

Geology
- Rock age: Cambrian
- Rock type: Sedimentary rock

Climbing
- Easiest route: class 2 hiking

Willard Peak (Shoshoni: Sogo goi) is a 9,763-foot elevation (2,976 m) mountain summit located on the common border Box Elder County shares with Weber County in Utah, United States.

== Description ==
Willard Peak is situated on the crest of the Wasatch Range which is a subset of the Rocky Mountains, and it is set on land managed by Wasatch-Cache National Forest. The summit is the highest point in Weber County as well as the Northern Wasatch Range. The town of Willard is four miles to the northwest and Ben Lomond Mountain is 1.5 mile to the southeast. The peak is located at the head of Willard Creek and precipitation runoff from the mountain's slopes ultimately drains to Great Salt Lake. Topographic relief is significant as the summit rises over 5,500 feet (1,700 meters) above Willard Bay in four miles.

== History ==
This landform's toponym, which refers to Willard Richards (1804–1854), has been officially adopted by the U.S. Board on Geographic Names. The peak was climbed in 1877 by Samuel Escue Tillman and Rogers Birnie of the Hayden Survey and used as a triangulation station. The survey referred to the peak as "Willard's Peak" in an 1879 published report, and "Willard Peak" has appeared in publications since at least 1895. Back then, "Willard's Peak" might have referred to present-day Ben Lomond Mountain.

== Gallery ==
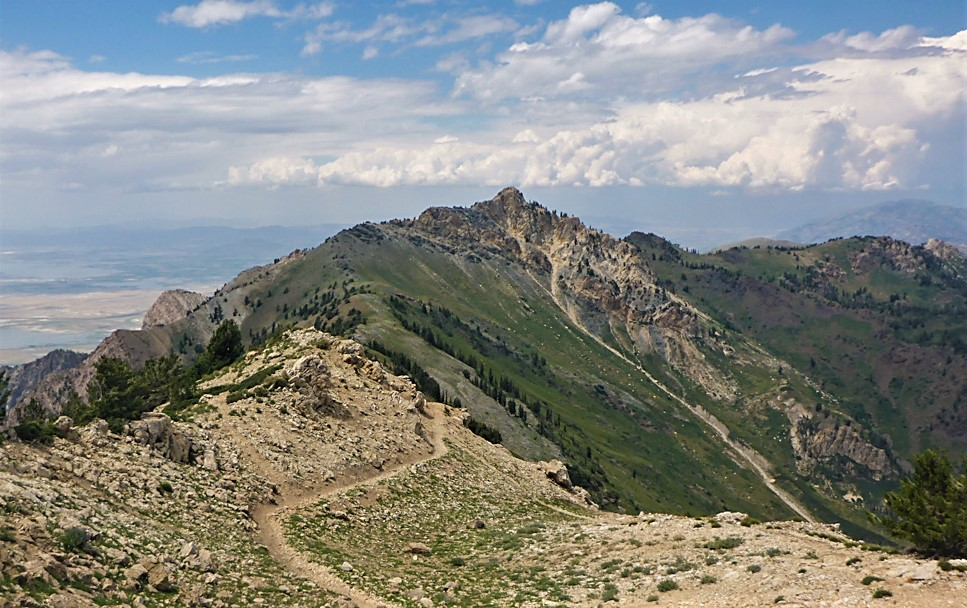
Willard Peak from Ben Lomond Trail

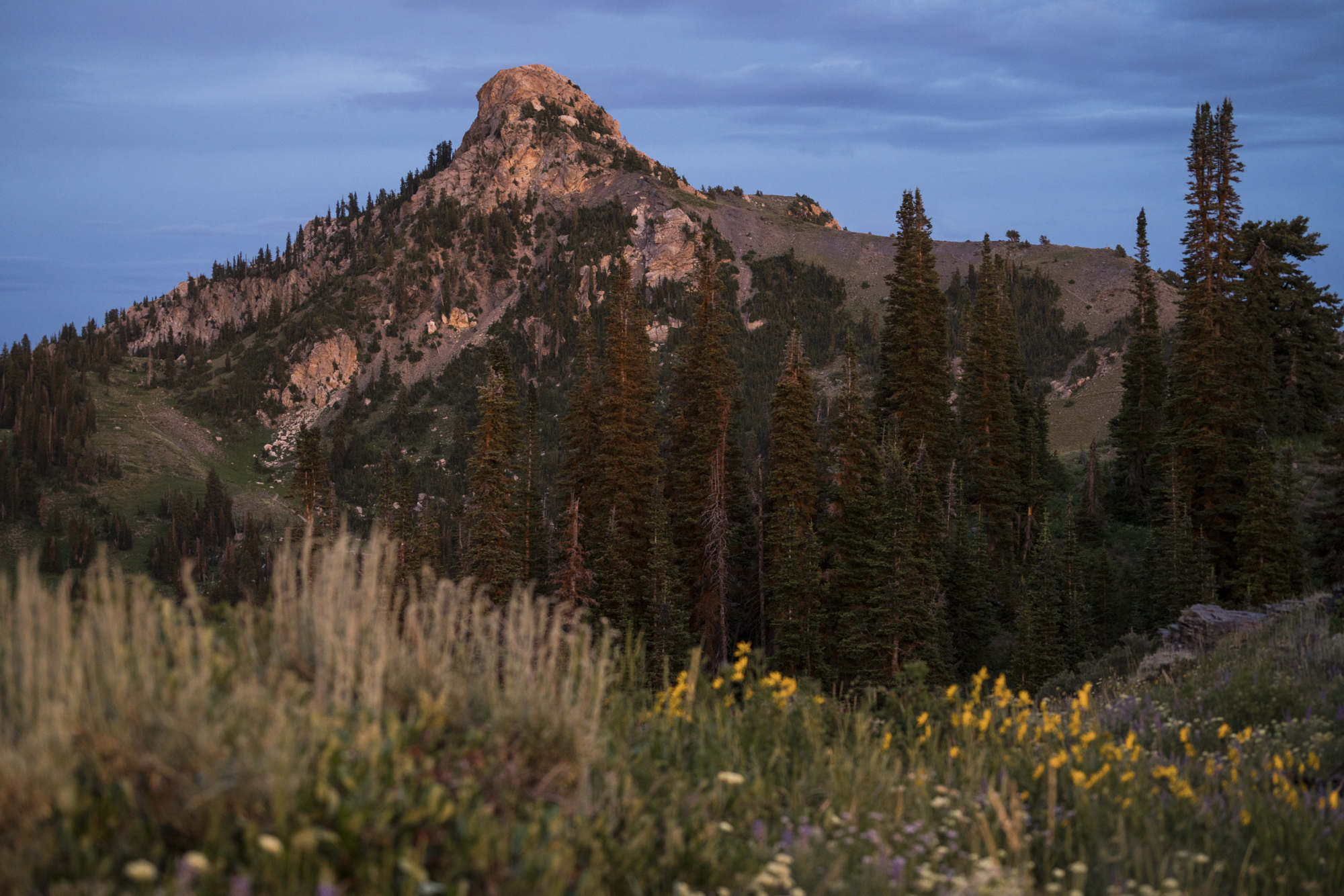
Northwest aspect

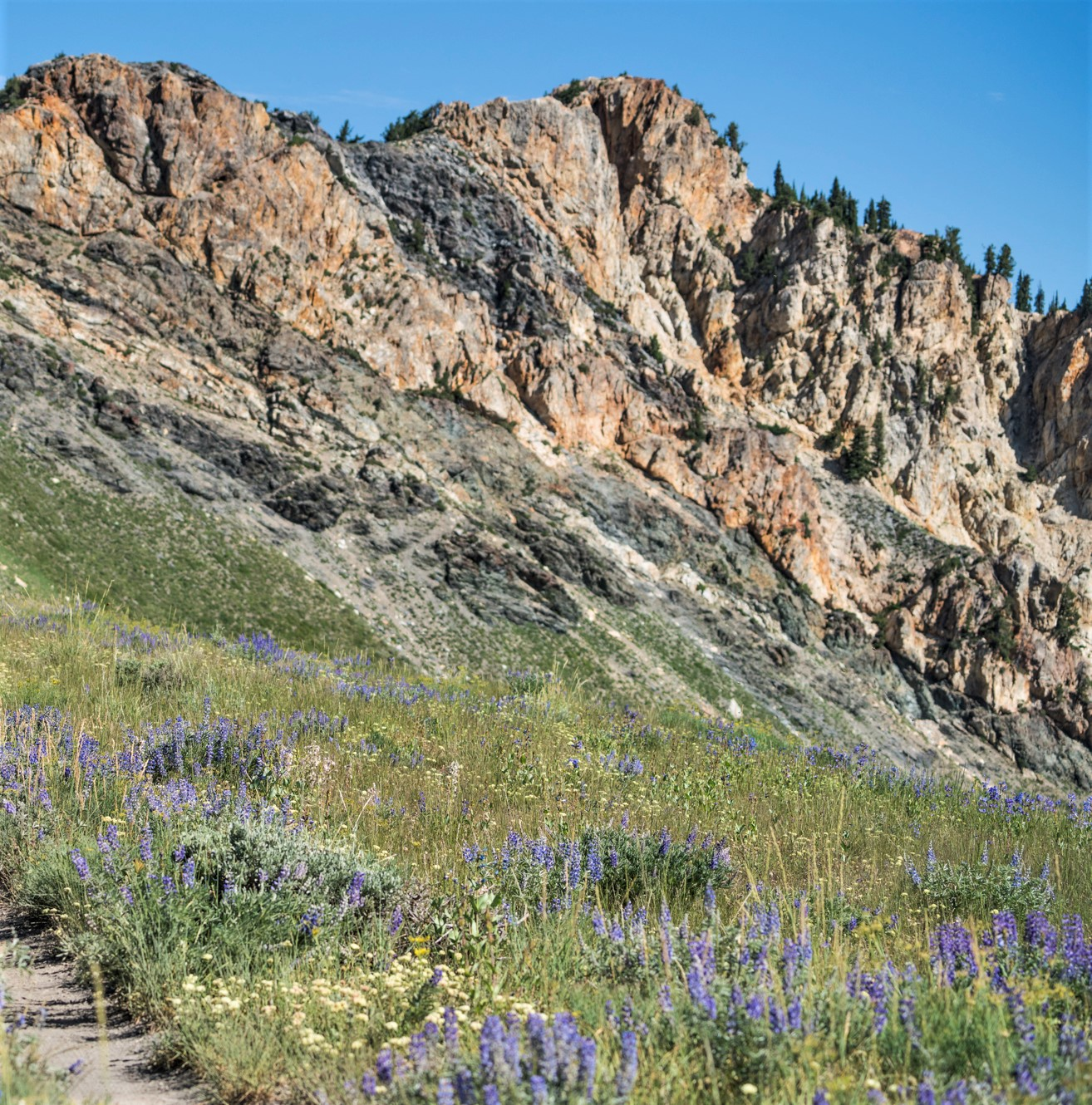
Southeast aspect

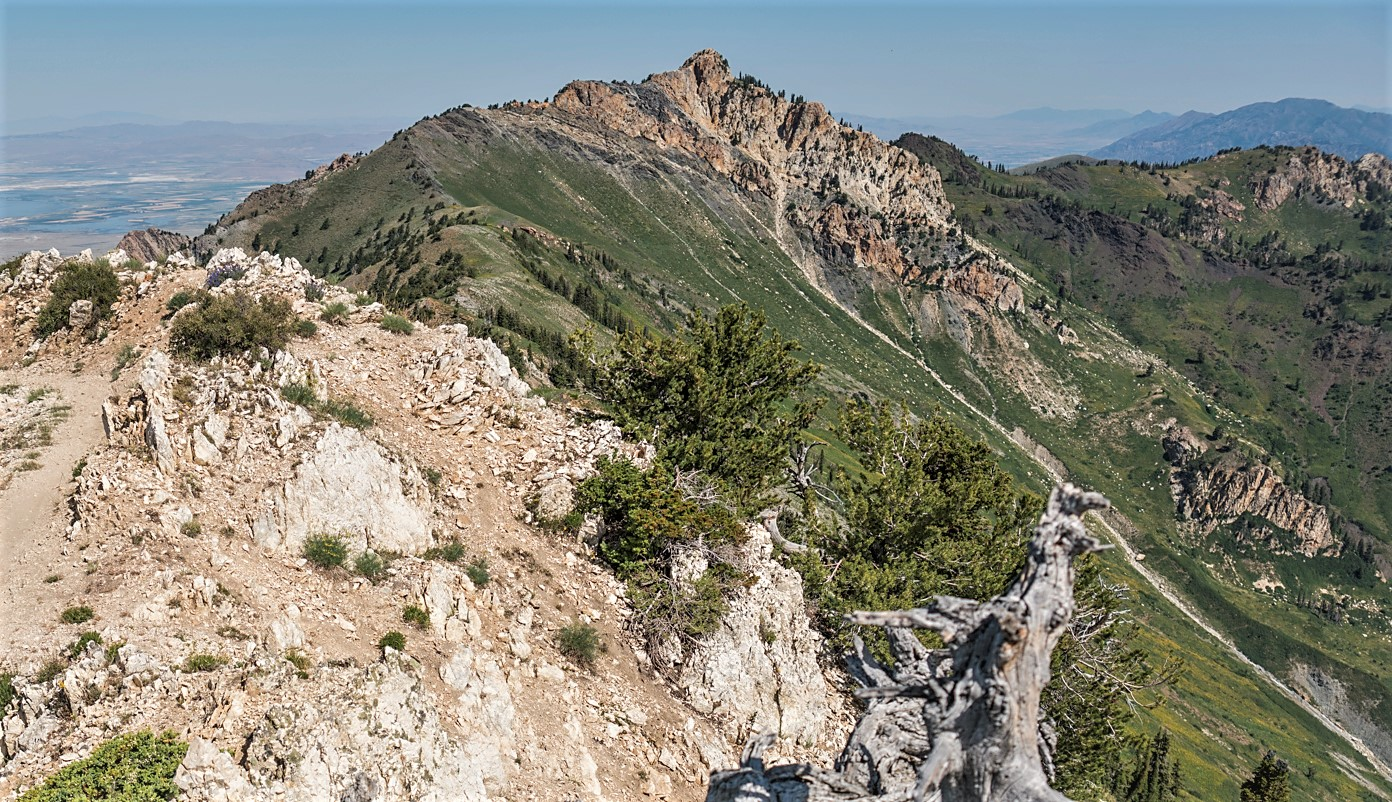
Willard Peak from Ben Lomond Trail

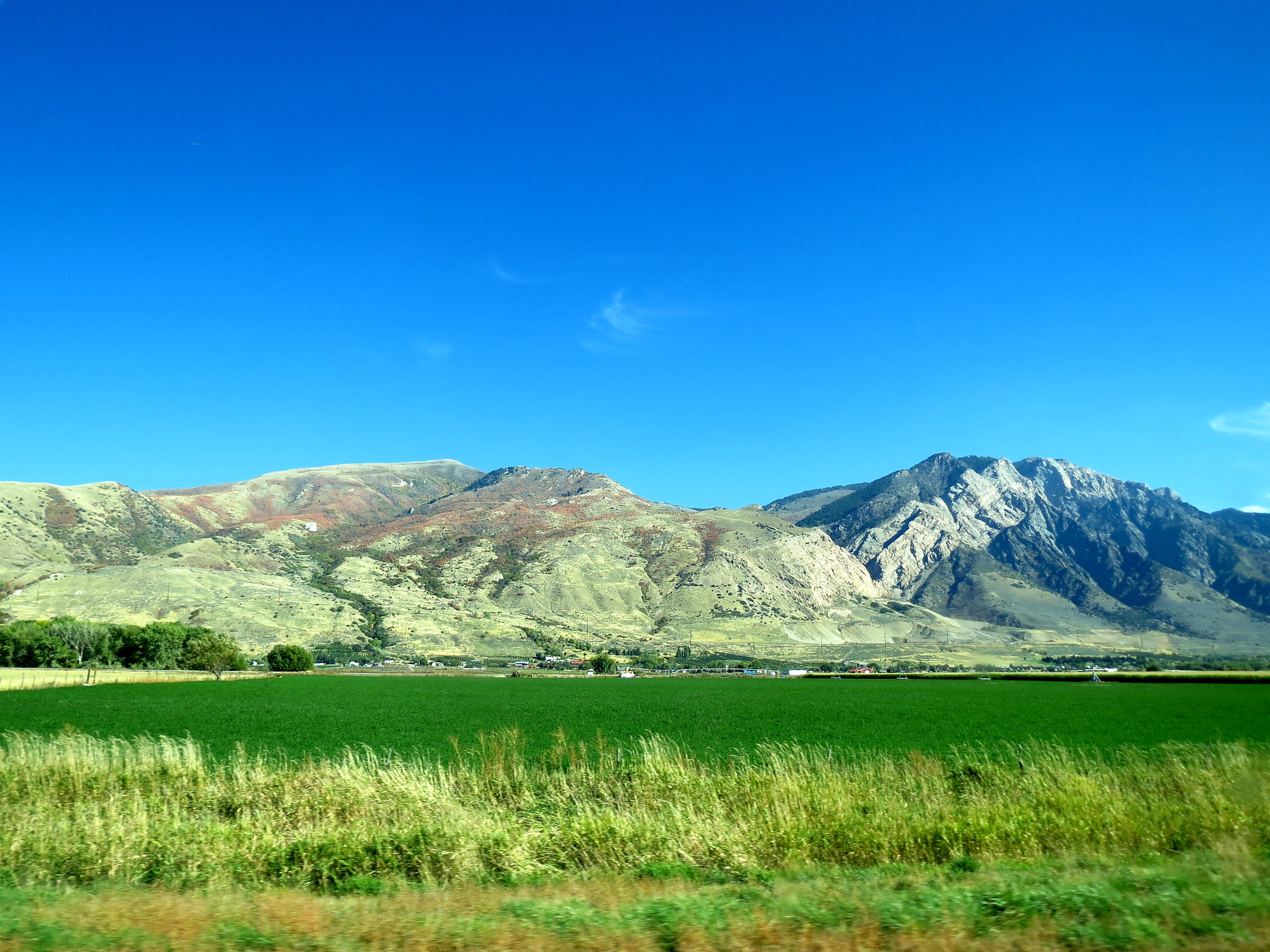
Northwest slope of Willard to the right. (summit not visible)

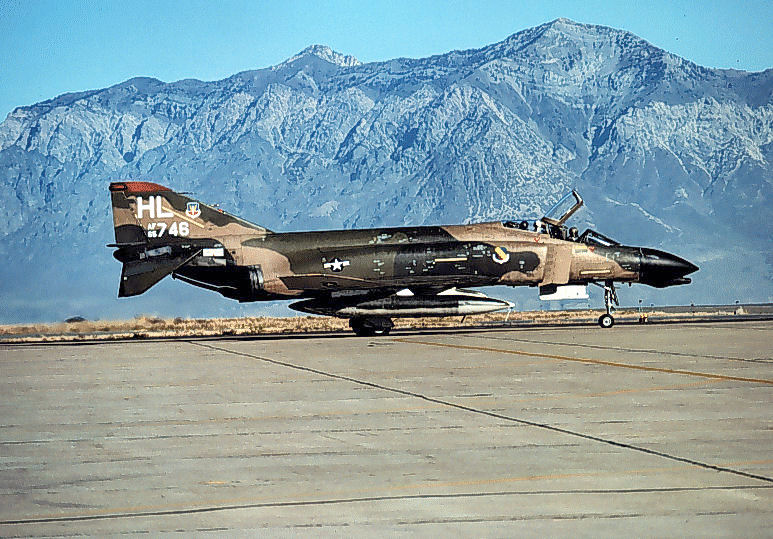
Willard Peak and Ben Lomond (right)

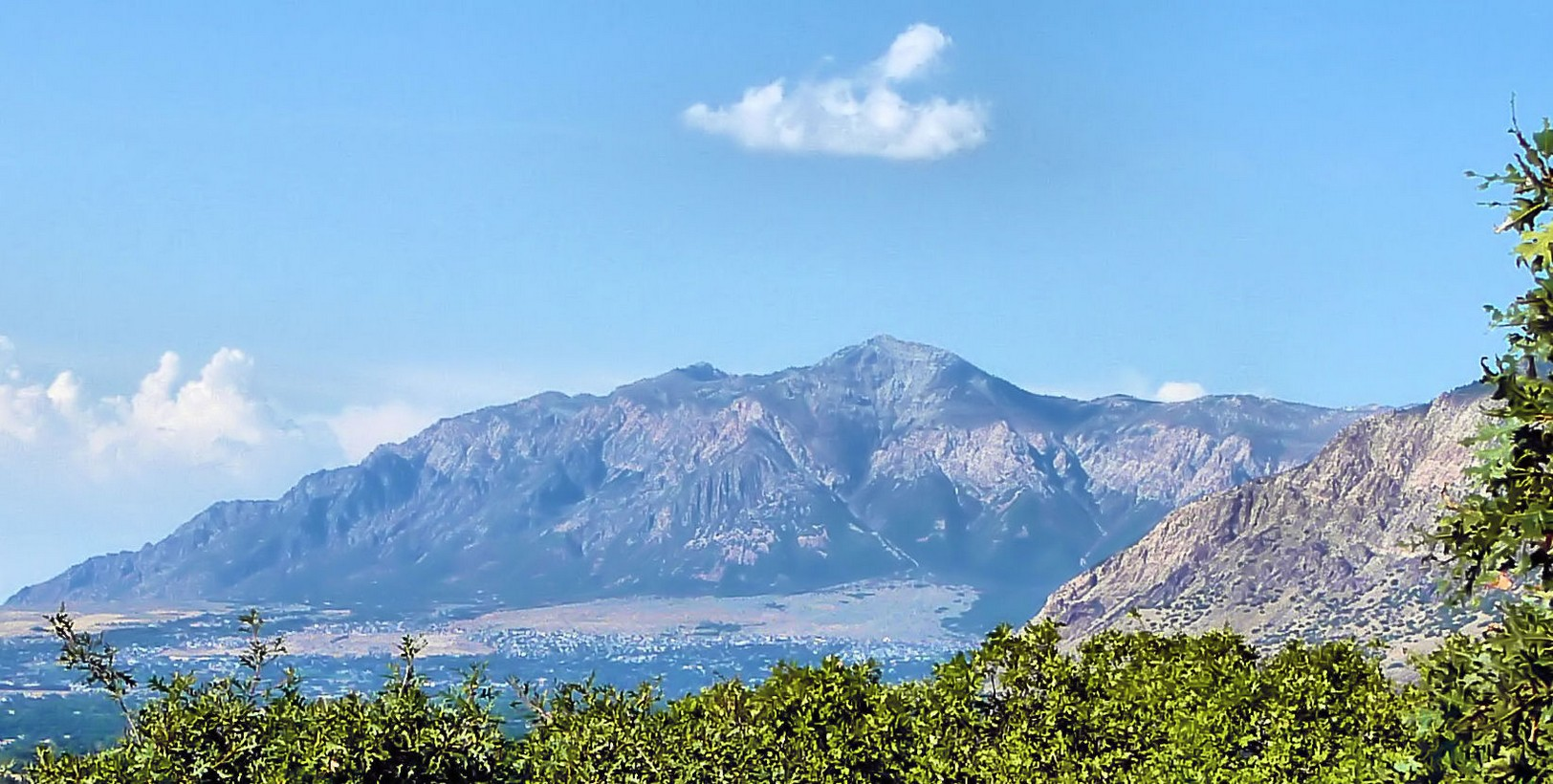
Willard Peak and Ben Lomond from the south

== See also ==
- List of mountain peaks of Utah
