= Mount Massive =

Mountain in Colorado, United States

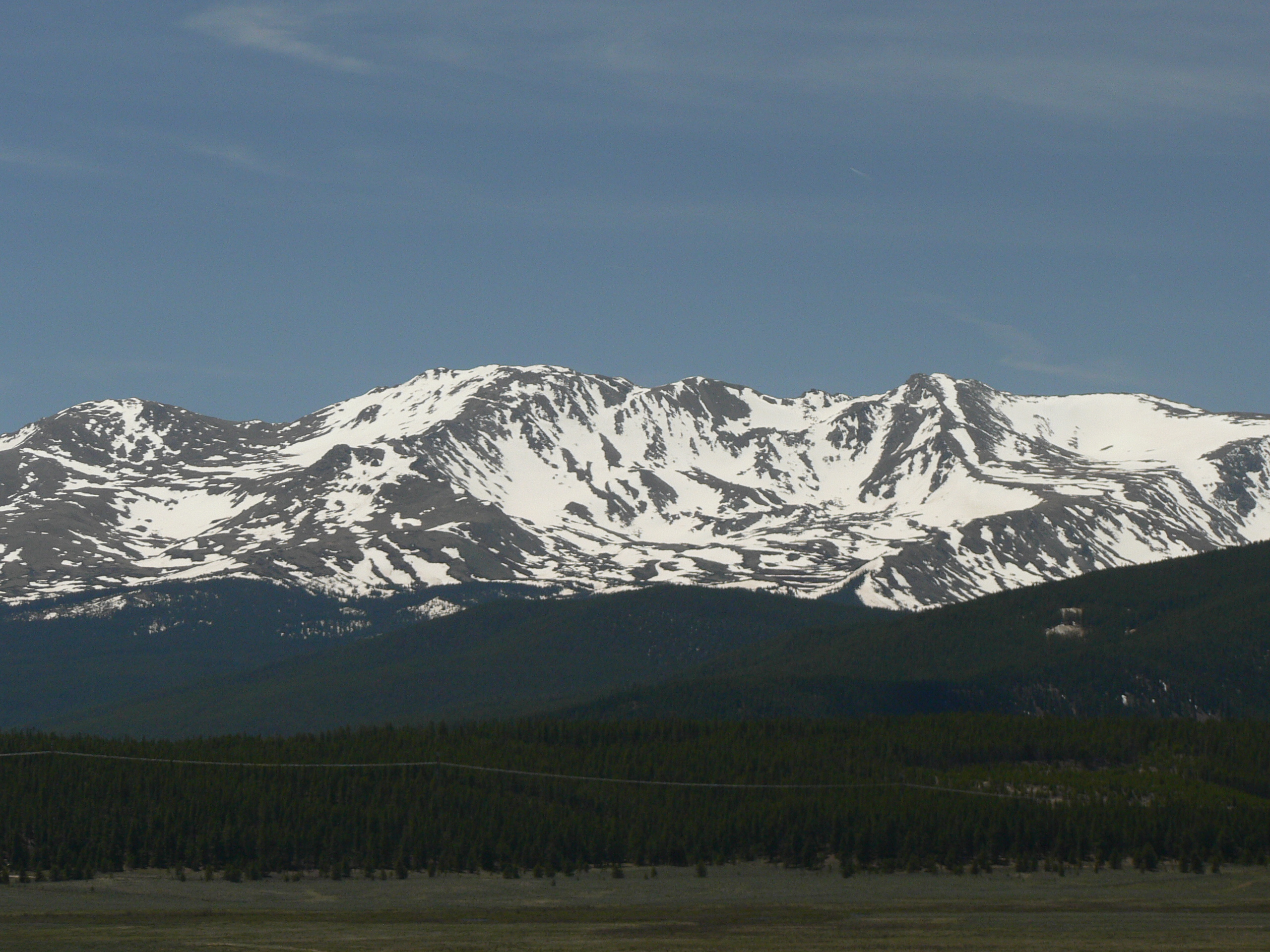

Highest point
- Elevation: 14,421 ft (4,396 m); NAPGD2022
- Prominence: 1,961 ft (598 m)
- Isolation: 5.06 mi (8.14 km)
- Listing: North America highest peaks 28th; US highest major peaks 15th; Colorado highest major peaks 2nd; Colorado fourteeners 2nd
- Coordinates: 39°11′15″N 106°28′33″W

Geography
- Location within Colorado
- Location: Lake County, Colorado, U.S.
- Parent range: Sawatch Range, Highest summit of the Massive Massif
- Topo map(s): USGS 7.5' topographic map Mount Massive, Colorado

Climbing
- First ascent: 1873 by Henry Gannett
- Easiest route: East Slopes: Hike, class 2

Mount Massive (Arapaho: Hiwoxuu hookuhu'ee) is the second-highest summit of the Rocky Mountains of North America and the U.S. state of Colorado. It is located in the Mount Massive Wilderness of San Isabel National Forest, 10.6 mi (17.1 km) west-southwest (bearing 247°) of the City of Leadville in Lake County, Colorado, United States. It ranks as the third-highest peak in the contiguous United States after Mount Whitney and Mount Elbert. (Note: The elevation of Mount Massive includes an adjustment of +2.087 m (+6.85 ft) from NGVD 29 to NAVD 88.)

== Mountain ==
Mount Massive was first surveyed and climbed in 1873 during the Hayden Survey of the American West. Survey member Henry Gannett is credited with the first ascent. Its name comes from its elongated shape: it has five summits, all above 14,000 ft (4,300 m), and a summit ridge over 3 mi (4.8 km) long, resulting in more area above 14,000 ft (4,300 m) than any other mountain in the 48 contiguous states, narrowly edging Mount Rainier in that category. Mount Elbert (14,440 ft (4,400 m)) is Mount Massive's nearest neighbor among the fourteeners; it lies about 5 mi (8.0 km) south-southeast of the peak.

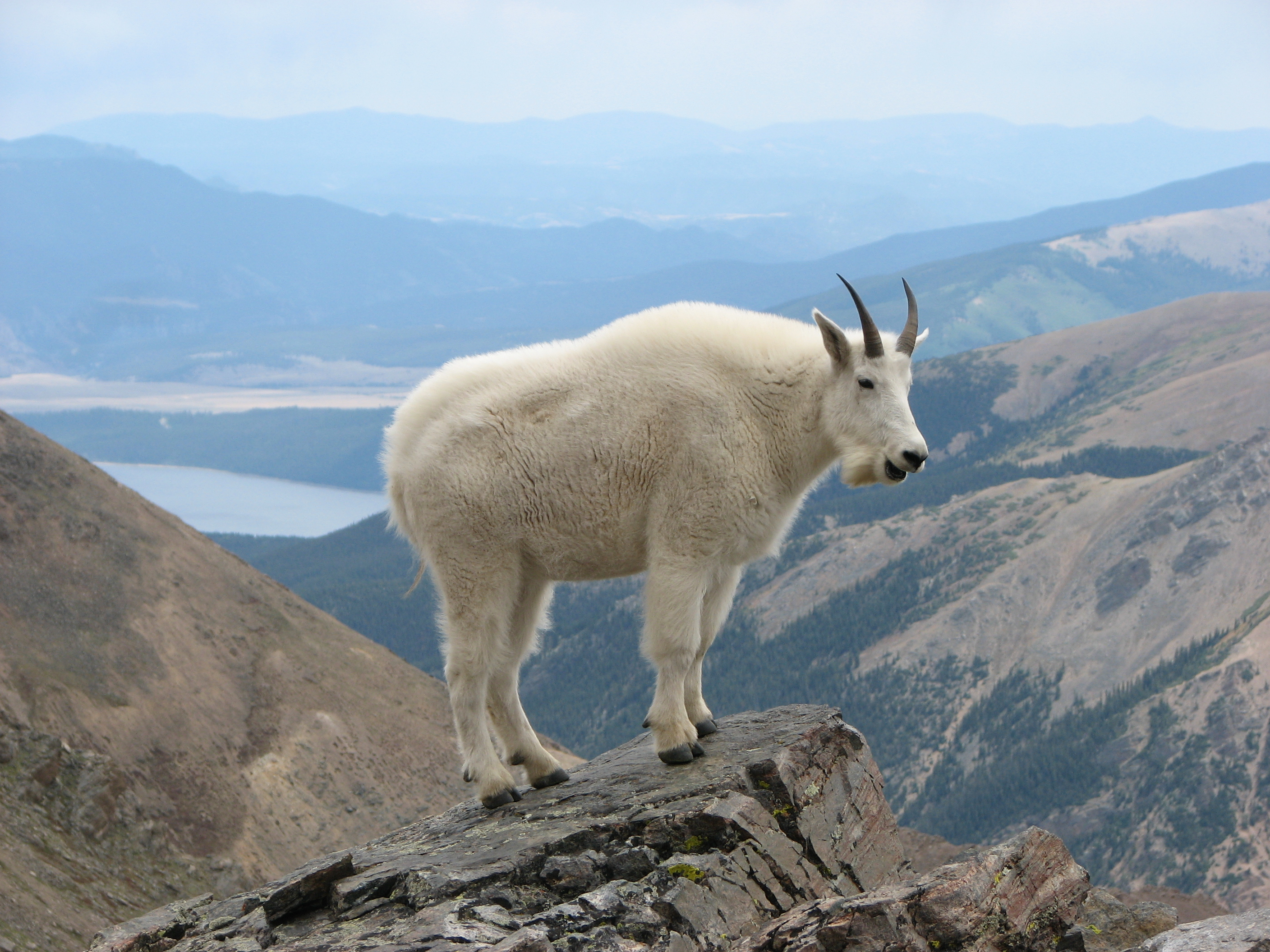
Mountain Goat, Mount Massive ~ 2009

A matter of some contention after the Great Depression arose over the heights of Massive and its neighbor, Mount Elbert, which have a height difference of only 12 ft (3.7 m). This led to an ongoing dispute which came to a head with the Mount Massive supporters taking it upon themselves to build large piles of stones on the summit to boost its height, only to have the Mount Elbert proponents demolish them.

A class 2 hiking path leads to the peak from the eastern face. The path is 13.6 mi (21.9 km) round trip, with a 4,500 ft (1,400 m) elevation gain. There is also a class 2 route along the southwest slopes.

There are several glacial lakes in the wilderness area. The lower slopes of the mountain are covered in lodgepole pine forests, which gradually yield to Engelmann Spruce and Fir. Treeline is just below 12,000 ft (3,700 m). Among the mountain's fauna are the American pika, the mountain goat, elk, mule deer, moose, Canada jay, martin, and the yellow-bellied marmot.

In the Arapaho Language the Collegiate Range and Mount Massive are called Hiwoxuu hookuhu'ee or Elk's Head.

== Climate ==
Climate data for Mount Massive (CO) 39.1836 N, 106.4761 W, Elevation: 13,934 ft (4,247 m) (1991–2020 normals)
Month	Jan	Feb	Mar	Apr	May	Jun	Jul	Aug	Sep	Oct	Nov	Dec	Year
Mean daily maximum °F (°C)	19.7 (−6.8)	18.8 (−7.3)	24.0 (−4.4)	30.3 (−0.9)	39.1 (3.9)	50.2 (10.1)	56.5 (13.6)	54.4 (12.4)	47.9 (8.8)	37.0 (2.8)	26.0 (−3.3)	19.8 (−6.8)	35.3 (1.8)
Daily mean °F (°C)	8.2 (−13.2)	7.0 (−13.9)	11.7 (−11.3)	17.1 (−8.3)	25.9 (−3.4)	36.2 (2.3)	42.4 (5.8)	40.9 (4.9)	34.6 (1.4)	24.6 (−4.1)	15.0 (−9.4)	8.7 (−12.9)	22.7 (−5.2)
Mean daily minimum °F (°C)	−3.3 (−19.6)	−4.8 (−20.4)	−0.6 (−18.1)	3.9 (−15.6)	12.7 (−10.7)	22.2 (−5.4)	28.3 (−2.1)	27.4 (−2.6)	21.3 (−5.9)	12.1 (−11.1)	4.1 (−15.5)	−2.4 (−19.1)	10.1 (−12.2)
Average precipitation inches (mm)	4.76 (121)	4.48 (114)	4.73 (120)	5.80 (147)	4.46 (113)	1.78 (45)	2.05 (52)	2.21 (56)	3.00 (76)	3.80 (97)	4.71 (120)	4.08 (104)	45.86 (1,165)
Source: PRISM Climate Group

== See also ==
- List of mountain peaks of North America
  - List of mountain peaks of the United States
    - List of mountain peaks of Colorado
      - List of Colorado fourteeners
