= Crater Peak =

Crater Peak may refer to one of the following:

- One of eight mountain peaks in the United States:
  - Crater Peak (Alaska)
  - Crater Peak (California)
  - Crater Peak (Colorado), summit of the Grand Mesa
  - Crater Peak (Shoshone County, Idaho)
  - Crater Peak (Valley County, Idaho)
  - Crater Peak (New Mexico)
  - Crater Peak (Oregon)
  - Crater Peak (Washington)
