= List of mountain ranges of Colorado =

Coordinates: 39.1178°N 106.4454°W

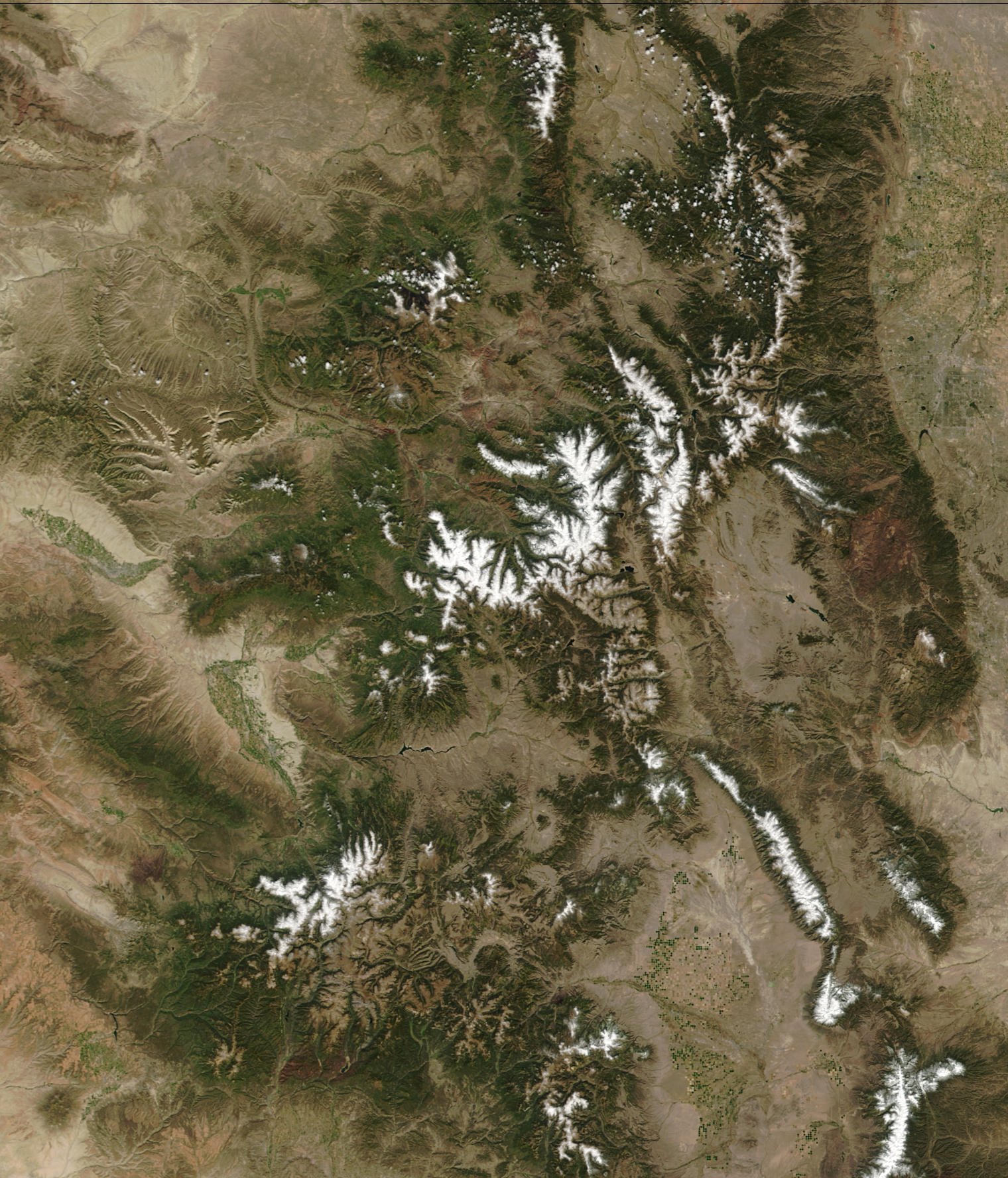
An enlargeable satellite photograph of the portion of the Rocky Mountains within the State of Colorado.

All the major mountain ranges in the state of Colorado, United States, are considered subranges of the Southern Rocky Mountains.

As given in the table, topographic elevation is the vertical distance above the reference geoid, a mathematical model of the Earth's sea level as an equipotential gravitational surface. The topographic prominence of a summit is the elevation difference between that summit and the highest or key col to a higher summit. The topographic isolation of a summit is the minimum great-circle distance to a point of equal elevation.

All elevations in this article include an elevation adjustment from the National Geodetic Vertical Datum of 1929 (NGVD 29) to the North American Vertical Datum of 1988 (NAVD 88). For further information, please see this United States National Geodetic Survey note. If an elevation or prominence is calculated as a range of values, the arithmetic mean is shown.

== Mountain ranges ==
Mountain ranges of the U.S. State of Colorado
Mountain range			Highest summit			
Primary	Secondary	Tertiary	Summit name	Elevation	Prominence	Isolation
Sawatch Range	Central Sawatch Range	Elbert Massif	Mount Elbert (Note: The summit of Mount Elbert is the highest point of the Rocky Mountains, the State of Colorado, and Lake County.) (Note: The elevation of Mount Elbert includes an adjustment of +1.995 m (6.55 ft) from NGVD 29 to NAVD 88.)	14,440 ft 4401 m	9,093 ft 2772 m	671 mi 1,079 km
Sawatch Range	Central Sawatch Range	Massive Massif	Mount Massive (Note: Mount Massive is the second highest peak of the Rocky Mountains..) (Note: The elevation of Mount Massive includes an adjustment of +2.087 m (6.85 ft) from NGVD 29 to NAVD 88.)	14,428 ft 4398 m	1,961 ft 598 m	5.06 mi 8.14 km
Sawatch Range	Central Sawatch Range	Collegiate Peaks	Mount Harvard (Note: The summit of Mount Harvard is the highest point of the Collegiate Peaks and Chaffee County, Colorado.) (Note: The elevation of Mount Harvard includes an adjustment of +2.084 m (6.84 ft) from NGVD 29 to NAVD 88.)	14,421 ft 4396 m	2,360 ft 719 m	14.92 mi 24 km
Sawatch Range	Central Sawatch Range	Williams Mountains	Bill Williams Peak (Note: The summit of Bill Williams Peak is the highest point of the Williams Mountains.) (Note: The elevation of Bill Williams Peak includes an adjustment of +2.044 m (6.71 ft) from NGVD 29 to NAVD 88.)	13,389 ft 4081 m	1,682 ft 513 m	3.73 mi 6 km
Sawatch Range	Southern Sawatch Range		Mount Antero (Note: The summit of Mount Antero is the highest point of the southern Sawatch Range.) (Note: The elevation of Mount Antero includes an adjustment of +2.071 m (6.79 ft) from NGVD 29 to NAVD 88.)	14,276 ft 4351 m	2,503 ft 763 m	17.67 mi 28.4 km
Sawatch Range	Southern Sawatch Range	Far Southern Sawatch Range	Mount Ouray (Note: The summit of Mount Ouray is the highest point of the far southern Sawatch Range.) (Note: The elevation of Mount Ouray includes an adjustment of +1.871 m (6.14 ft) from NGVD 29 to NAVD 88.)	13,961 ft 4255 m	2,659 ft 810 m	13.58 mi 21.9 km
Sawatch Range	Northern Sawatch Range		Mount of the Holy Cross (Note: The summit of Mount of the Holy Cross is the highest point of the northern Sawatch Range and Eagle County, Colorado.) (Note: The summit elevation of Mount of the Holy Cross includes a vertical offset of +0.61 m (2 ft) from the station benchmark.) (Note: The elevation of Mount of the Holy Cross includes an adjustment of +1.926 m (6.32 ft) from NGVD 29 to NAVD 88.)	14,011 ft 4271 m	2,111 ft 643 m	18.41 mi 29.6 km
Sangre de Cristo Mountains	Sierra Blanca Massif		Blanca Peak (Note: The summit of Blanca Peak is the highest point of the Sierra Blanca Massif, the Sangre de Cristo Mountains, Alamosa County and Costilla County, Colorado.) (Note: The elevation of Blanca Peak includes an adjustment of +1.755 m (5.76 ft) from NGVD 29 to NAVD 88.)	14,351 ft 4374 m	5,326 ft 1623 m	103.4 mi 166.4 km
Sangre de Cristo Mountains	Northern Sangre de Cristo Range	Crestones	Crestone Peak (Note: The summit of Crestone Peak is the highest point of the northern Sangre de Cristo Mountains and Saguache County, Colorado.) (Note: The elevation of Crestone Peak includes an adjustment of +1.76 m (5.77 ft) from NGVD 29 to NAVD 88.)	14,300 ft 4359 m	4,554 ft 1388 m	27.4 mi 44 km
Sangre de Cristo Mountains	Northern Sangre de Cristo Range		Rito Alto Peak (Note: The elevation of Rito Alto Peak includes an adjustment of +1.808 m (5.93 ft) from NGVD 29 to NAVD 88.)	13,803 ft 4207 m	1,134 ft 346 m	7.28 mi 11.71 km
Sangre de Cristo Mountains	Culebra Range		Culebra Peak (Note: The summit of Culebra Peak is the highest point of the Culebra Range.) (Note: The elevation of Culebra Peak includes an adjustment of +1.74 m (5.71 ft) from NGVD 29 to NAVD 88.)	14,053 ft 4283 m	4,827 ft 1471 m	35.4 mi 56.9 km
Sangre de Cristo Mountains	Culebra Range	Spanish Peaks	West Spanish Peak (Note: The summit of West Spanish Peak is the highest point of Las Animas County, Colorado.) (Note: West Spanish Peak is the easternmost 13,000-foot (4,000 m) summit of the United States..) (Note: The elevation of West Spanish Peak includes an adjustment of +1.468 m (4.82 ft) from NGVD 29 to NAVD 88.)	13,631 ft 4155 m	3,686 ft 1123 m	20.5 mi 33 km
Sangre de Cristo Mountains	Wet Mountains		Greenhorn Mountain (Note: The summit of Greenhorn Mountain is the highest point of the Wet Mountains and Pueblo County, Colorado.) (Note: The elevation of Greenhorn Mountain includes an adjustment of +1.401 m (4.6 ft) from NGVD 29 to NAVD 88.)	12,352 ft 3765 m	3,777 ft 1151 m	25.2 mi 40.6 km
San Juan Mountains	North Central San Juan Mountains		Uncompahgre Peak (Note: The summit of Uncompahgre Peak is the highest point of the San Juan Mountains and Hinsdale County, Colorado.) (Note: The elevation of Uncompahgre Peak includes an adjustment of +1.967 m (6.45 ft) from NGVD 29 to NAVD 88.)	14,321 ft 4365 m	4,277 ft 1304 m	85.1 mi 136.9 km
San Juan Mountains	San Miguel Mountains		Mount Wilson (Note: The summit of Mount Wilson is the highest point of the San Miguel Mountains and Dolores County, Colorado.) (Note: The elevation of Mount Wilson includes an adjustment of +1.899 m (6.23 ft) from NGVD 29 to NAVD 88.)	14,252 ft 4344 m	4,024 ft 1227 m	33 mi 53.1 km
San Juan Mountains	Sneffels Range		Mount Sneffels (Note: The summit of Mount Sneffels is the highest point of the Sneffels Range and Ouray County, Colorado.) (Note: The elevation of Mount Sneffels includes an adjustment of +1.879 m (6.16 ft) from NGVD 29 to NAVD 88.)	14,158 ft 4315 m	3,050 ft 930 m	15.71 mi 25.3 km
San Juan Mountains	Needle Mountains		Windom Peak (Note: The summit of Windom Peak is the highest point of the Needle Mountains and La Plata County, Colorado.) (Note: Mount Eolus may be higher than Windom Peak..) (Note: The elevation of Windom Peak includes an adjustment of +1.785 m (5.86 ft) from NGVD 29 to NAVD 88.)	14,093 ft 4296 m	2,187 ft 667 m	26.3 mi 42.4 km
San Juan Mountains	Needle Mountains	Grenadier Range	Vestal Peak (Note: The summit of Vestal Peak is the highest point of the Grenadier Range.) (Note: The elevation of Vestal Peak includes an adjustment of +1.781 m (5.84 ft) from NGVD 29 to NAVD 88.)	13,870 ft 4228 m	1,124 ft 343 m	4.29 mi 6.91 km
San Juan Mountains	Needle Mountains	West Needle Mountains	Twilight Peak (Note: The summit of Twilight Peak is the highest point of the West Needle Mountains.) (Note: The elevation of Twilight Peak includes an adjustment of +1.537 m (5.04 ft) from NGVD 29 to NAVD 88.)	13,163 ft 4012 m	2,338 ft 713 m	4.88 mi 7.86 km
San Juan Mountains	La Garita Mountains		Phoenix Peak (Note: The summit of Phoenix Peak is the highest point of the La Garita Mountains.) (Note: The elevation of Phoenix Peak includes an adjustment of +2 m (6.56 ft) from NGVD 29 to NAVD 88.)	13,902 ft 4237 m	1,495 ft 456 m	3.03 mi 4.87 km
San Juan Mountains	Cochetopa Hills		Long Branch Baldy (Note: The summit of Long Branch Baldy is the highest point of the Cochetopa Hills.) (Note: The elevation of Long Branch Baldy includes an adjustment of +1.86 m (6.1 ft) from NGVD 29 to NAVD 88.)	11,982 ft 3652 m	1,454 ft 443 m	13.22 mi 21.3 km
San Juan Mountains	East Central San Juan Mountains		Half Peak (Note: The summit of Half Peak is the highest point of the east central San Juan Mountains.) (Note: The elevation of Half Peak includes an adjustment of +1.998 m (6.56 ft) from NGVD 29 to NAVD 88.)	13,848 ft 4221 m	1,501 ft 458 m	3.89 mi 6.26 km
San Juan Mountains	Southern San Juan Mountains		Summit Peak (Note: The summit of Summit Peak is the highest point of the southern San Juan Mountains and Archuleta County, Colorado.) (Note: The summit elevation of Summit Peak includes a vertical offset of -0.15 m (-0.5 ft) from the station benchmark.) (Note: The elevation of Summit Peak includes an adjustment of +1.877 m (6.16 ft) from NGVD 29 to NAVD 88.)	13,307 ft 4056 m	2,760 ft 841 m	39.6 mi 63.7 km
San Juan Mountains	La Plata Mountains		Hesperus Mountain (Note: The summit of Hesperus Mountain is the highest point of the La Plata Mountains and Montezuma County, Colorado.) (Note: The elevation of Hesperus Mountain includes an adjustment of +1.65 m (5.41 ft) from NGVD 29 to NAVD 88.)	13,237 ft 4035 m	2,852 ft 869 m	24.5 mi 39.5 km
Mosquito Range			Mount Lincoln (Note: The summit of Mount Lincoln is the highest point of the Mosquito Range and Park County, Colorado.) (Note: The elevation of Mount Lincoln includes an adjustment of +2.098 m (6.88 ft) from NGVD 29 to NAVD 88.)	14,293 ft 4357 m	3,862 ft 1177 m	22.5 mi 36.2 km
Mosquito Range	Tenmile Range		Quandary Peak (Note: The summit of Quandary Peak is the highest point of the Tenmile Range.) (Note: The elevation of Quandary Peak includes an adjustment of +2.071 m (6.79 ft) from NGVD 29 to NAVD 88.)	14,271 ft 4350 m	1,125 ft 343 m	3.16 mi 5.09 km
Front Range	Central Front Range		Grays Peak (Note: The summit of Grays Peak is the highest point of the Front Range, the Continental Divide of North America, Clear Creek County and Summit County, Colorado.) (Note: The elevation of Grays Peak includes an adjustment of +1.881 m (6.17 ft) from NGVD 29 to NAVD 88.)	14,278 ft 4352 m	2,770 ft 844 m	25 mi 40.2 km
Front Range	Central Front Range	Chicago Peaks	Mount Blue Sky (Note: The summit elevation of Mount Blue Sky includes a vertical offset of +1.8 m (5.9 ft) from the station benchmark.) (Note: The elevation of Mount Blue Sky includes an adjustment of +1.827 m (5.99 ft) from NGVD 29 to NAVD 88.)	14,271 ft 4350 m	2,769 ft 844 m	9.79 mi 15.76 km
Front Range	Northern Front Range	Twin Peaks Massif	Longs Peak (Note: The summit of Longs Peak is the highest point of the northern Front Range, Rocky Mountain National Park, and Boulder County, Colorado.) (Note: The elevation of Longs Peak includes an adjustment of +1.652 m (5.42 ft) from NGVD 29 to NAVD 88.)	14,259 ft 4346 m	2,940 ft 896 m	43.6 mi 70.2 km
Front Range	Northern Front Range	Mummy Range	Hagues Peak (Note: The summit of Hagues Peak is the highest point of the Mummy Range and Larimer County, Colorado.) (Note: The elevation of Hagues Peak includes an adjustment of +1.719 m (5.64 ft) from NGVD 29 to NAVD 88.)	13,573 ft 4137 m	2,420 ft 738 m	15.7 mi 25.3 km
Front Range	Northern Front Range	Indian Peaks	North Arapaho Peak (Note: The summit of North Arapaho Peak is the highest point of the Indian Peaks.) (Note: The elevation of North Arapaho Peak includes an adjustment of +1.763 m (5.78 ft) from NGVD 29 to NAVD 88.)	13,508 ft 4117 m	1,665 ft 507 m	15.38 mi 24.8 km
Front Range	Northern Front Range	Never Summer Mountains	Mount Richthofen (Note: The summit of Mount Richthofen is the highest point of the Never Summer Mountains.) (Note: The elevation of Mount Richthofen includes an adjustment of +1.658 m (5.44 ft) from NGVD 29 to NAVD 88.)	12,945 ft 3946 m	2,680 ft 817 m	9.66 mi 15.54 km
Front Range	Southern Front Range	Pikes Peak Massif	Pikes Peak (Note: The summit of Pikes Peak is the highest point of the southern Front Range and El Paso County, Colorado.) (Note: Pikes Peak is the easternmost 14,000-foot (4,300 m) summit of the United States. Pikes Peak was the inspiration for the lyrics of America the Beautiful..) (Note: The elevation of Pikes Peak includes an adjustment of +1.678 m (5.51 ft) from NGVD 29 to NAVD 88.)	14,115 ft 4302 m	5,530 ft 1686 m	60.6 mi 97.6 km
Front Range	Southern Front Range	South Williams Fork Mountains	Ptarmigan Peak (Note: The summit of Ptarmigan Peak is the highest point of the South Williams Fork Mountains.) (Note: The elevation of Ptarmigan Peak includes an adjustment of +1.789 m (5.87 ft) from NGVD 29 to NAVD 88.)	12,504 ft 3811 m	721 ft 220 m	4.3 mi 6.92 km
Front Range	Southern Front Range	Kenosha Mountains	Knobby Crest (Note: The summit of Knobby Crest is the highest point of the Kenosha Mountains.) (Note: The elevation of Knobby Crest includes an adjustment of +1.595 m (5.23 ft) from NGVD 29 to NAVD 88.)	12,434 ft 3790 m	1,759 ft 536 m	8.27 mi 13.31 km
Front Range	Southern Front Range	Tarryall Mountains	Bison Peak (Note: The summit of Bison Peak is the highest point of the Tarryall Mountains.) (Note: The elevation of Bison Peak includes an adjustment of +1.623 m (5.32 ft) from NGVD 29 to NAVD 88.)	12,432 ft 3789 m	2,451 ft 747 m	18.23 mi 29.3 km
Front Range	Southern Front Range	South Park Hills	Waugh Mountain (Note: The summit of Waugh Mountain is the highest point of the South Park Hills.) (Note: The elevation of Waugh Mountain includes an adjustment of +1.702 m (5.58 ft) from NGVD 29 to NAVD 88.)	11,716 ft 3571 m	2,330 ft 710 m	18.86 mi 30.4 km
Front Range	Southern Front Range	Rampart Range	Devils Head (Note: The summit of Devils Head is the highest point of the Rampart Range.) (Note: The elevation of Devils Head includes an adjustment of +1.239 m (4.06 ft) from NGVD 29 to NAVD 88.)	9,749 ft 2972 m	1,248 ft 380 m	7.99 mi 12.86 km
Elk Mountains			Castle Peak (Note: The summit of Castle Peak is the highest point of the Elk Mountains, Gunnison County and Pitkin County, Colorado.) (Note: The elevation of Castle Peak includes an adjustment of +2.165 m (7.1 ft) from NGVD 29 to NAVD 88.)	14,279 ft 4352 m	2,365 ft 721 m	20.9 mi 33.6 km
Elk Mountains	Ruby Range		Mount Owen (Note: The summit of Mount Owen is the highest point of the Ruby Range.) (Note: The elevation of Mount Owen includes an adjustment of +1.99 m (6.53 ft) from NGVD 29 to NAVD 88.)	13,070 ft 3984 m	1,358 ft 414 m	7.39 mi 11.9 km
West Elk Mountains			West Elk Peak (Note: The summit of West Elk Peak is the highest point of the West Elk Mountains.) (Note: The elevation of West Elk Peak includes an adjustment of +2.105 m (6.91 ft) from NGVD 29 to NAVD 88.)	13,042 ft 3975 m	3,095 ft 943 m	13.78 mi 22.2 km
Gore Range			Mount Powell (Note: The summit of Mount Powell is the highest point of the Gore Range.) (Note: The elevation of Mount Powell includes an adjustment of +1.771 m (5.81 ft) from NGVD 29 to NAVD 88.)	13,586 ft 4141 m	3,000 ft 914 m	21.5 mi 34.6 km
Medicine Bow Mountains			Clark Peak (Note: The summit of Clark Peak is the highest point of the Medicine Bow Mountains and Jackson County, Colorado.) (Note: The summit elevation of Clark Peak includes a vertical offset of +1.83 m (6 ft) from the station benchmark.) (Note: The elevation of Clark Peak includes an adjustment of +1.628 m (5.34 ft) from NGVD 29 to NAVD 88.)	12,960 ft 3950 m	2,771 ft 845 m	16.4 mi 26.4 km
Flat Tops			Flat Top Mountain (Note: The summit of Flat Top Mountain is the highest point of the Flat Tops and Garfield County, Colorado.) (Note: The elevation of Flat Top Mountain includes an adjustment of +1.698 m (5.57 ft) from NGVD 29 to NAVD 88.)	12,361 ft 3768 m	4,054 ft 1236 m	40.8 mi 65.6 km
Rabbit Ears Range			Parkview Mountain (Note: The summit of Parkview Mountain is the highest point of the Rabbit Ears Range.) (Note: The elevation of Parkview Mountain includes an adjustment of +1.589 m (5.21 ft) from NGVD 29 to NAVD 88.)	12,301 ft 3749 m	2,676 ft 816 m	10.91 mi 17.56 km
Park Range	Central Park Range		Mount Zirkel (Note: The summit of Mount Zirkel is the highest point of the Park Range and Routt County, Colorado.) (Note: The elevation of Mount Zirkel includes an adjustment of +1.632 m (5.35 ft) from NGVD 29 to NAVD 88.)	12,185 ft 3714 m	3,470 ft 1058 m	37.7 mi 60.6 km
Park Range	Elkhead Mountains		Sand Mountain North (Note: The summit of Sand Mountain North is the highest point of the Elkhead Mountains.) (Note: The elevation of Sand Mountain North includes an adjustment of +1.502 m (4.93 ft) from NGVD 29 to NAVD 88.)	10,884 ft 3317 m	2,182 ft 665 m	17.7 mi 28.5 km
White River Plateau			Blair Mountain (Note: The summit of Blair Mountain is the highest point of the White River Plateau.) (Note: The elevation of Blair Mountain includes an adjustment of +1.565 m (5.13 ft) from NGVD 29 to NAVD 88.)	11,465 ft 3495 m	1,736 ft 529 m	11.5 mi 18.5 km
Grand Mesa			Crater Peak (Note: The summit of Crater Peak is the highest point of Grand Mesa.) (Note: The elevation of Crater Peak includes an adjustment of +1.75 m (5.74 ft) from NGVD 29 to NAVD 88.)	11,333 ft 3454 m	2,307 ft 703 m	17.98 mi 28.9 km
Laramie Mountains			South Bald Mountain (Note: The summit of South Bald Mountain is the highest point of the Laramie Mountains.) (Note: The summit elevation of South Bald Mountain includes a vertical offset of +0.61 m (2 ft) from the station benchmark.) (Note: The elevation of South Bald Mountain includes an adjustment of +1.424 m (4.67 ft) from NGVD 29 to NAVD 88.)	11,009 ft 3356 m	1,863 ft 568 m	8.54 mi 13.74 km
Uncompahgre Plateau			Horsefly Peak (Note: The summit of Horsefly Peak is the highest point of the Uncompahgre Plateau.) (Note: The elevation of Horsefly Peak includes an adjustment of +1.581 m (5.19 ft) from NGVD 29 to NAVD 88.)	10,353 ft 3156 m	1,437 ft 438 m	13.04 mi 21 km
Ute Mountain			Ute Peak (Note: The summit of Ute Peak is the highest point of Ute Mountain.) (Note: The elevation of Ute Peak includes an adjustment of +1.139 m (3.74 ft) from NGVD 29 to NAVD 88.)	9,984 ft 3043 m	4,039 ft 1231 m	34.3 mi 55.2 km

== Gallery ==
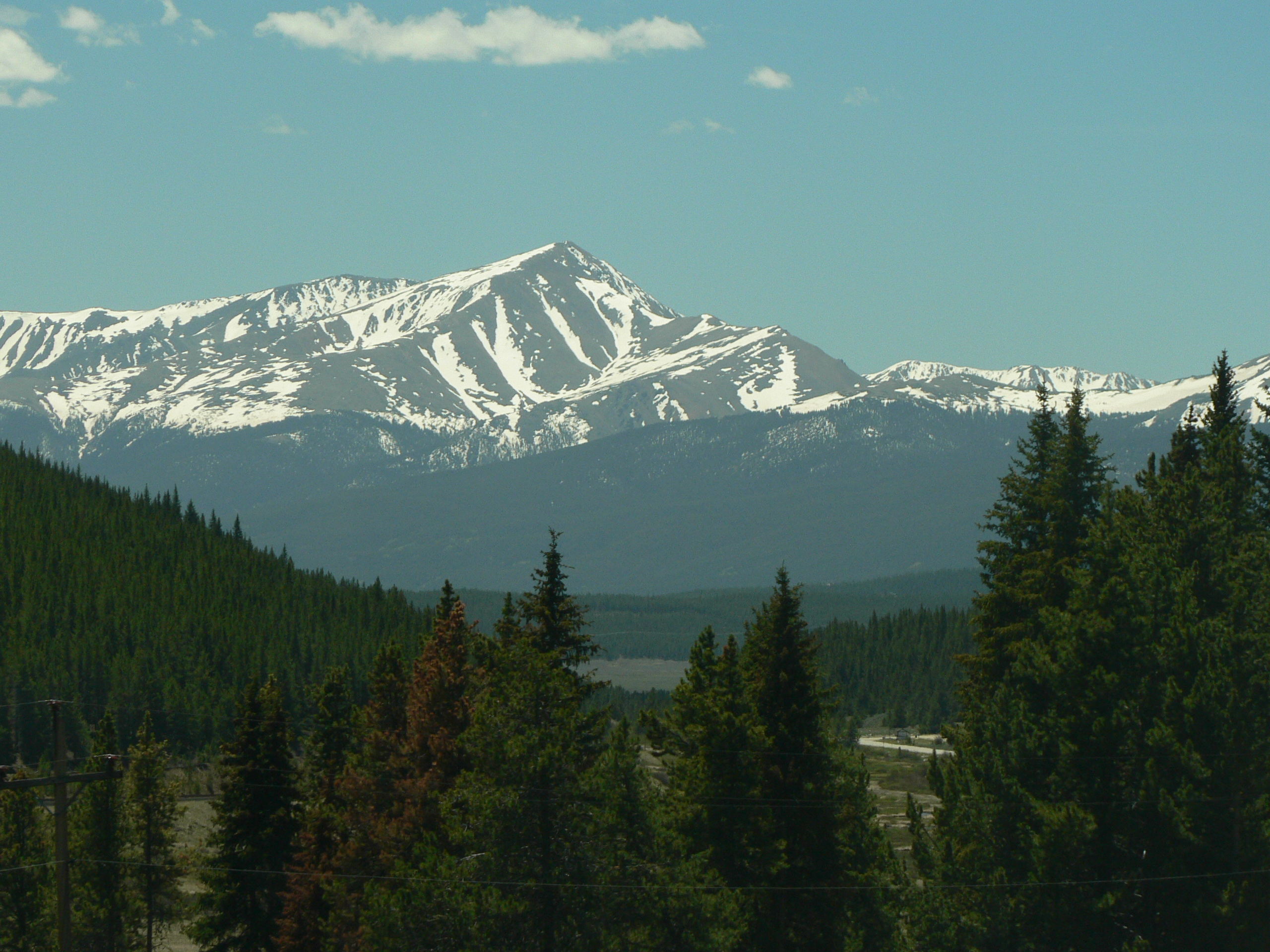
Mount Elbert is the highest peak of the Sawatch Range and the entire Rocky Mountains.

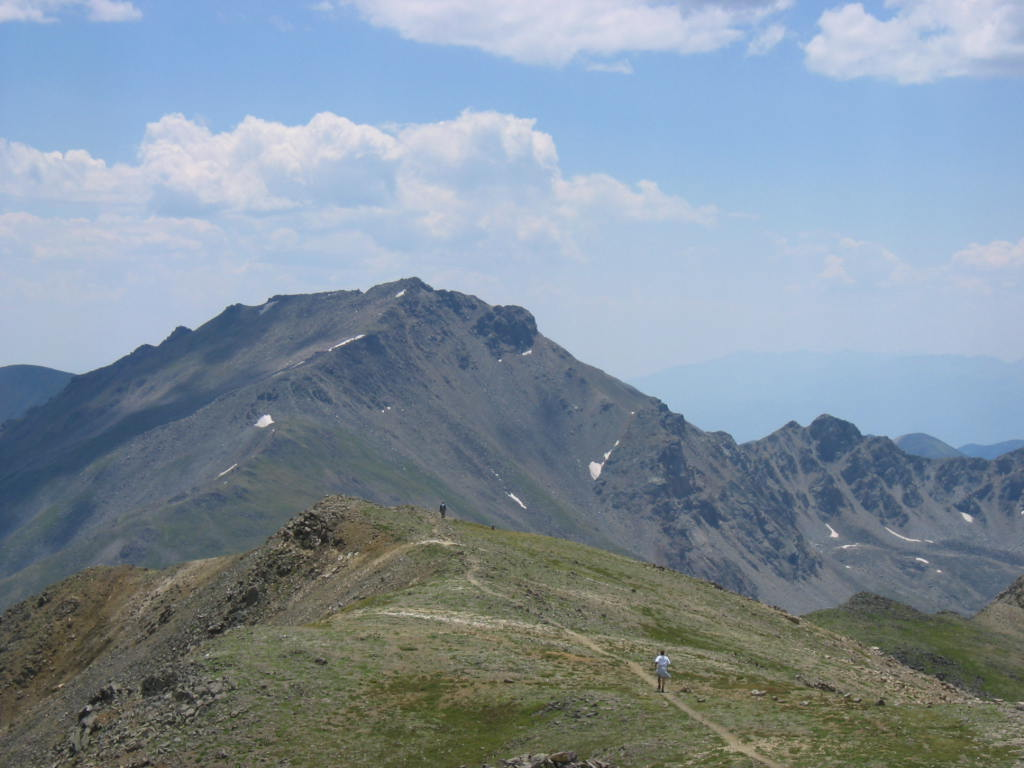
Mount Harvard is the highest of the Collegiate Peaks and the third-highest peak of the Rocky Mountains.

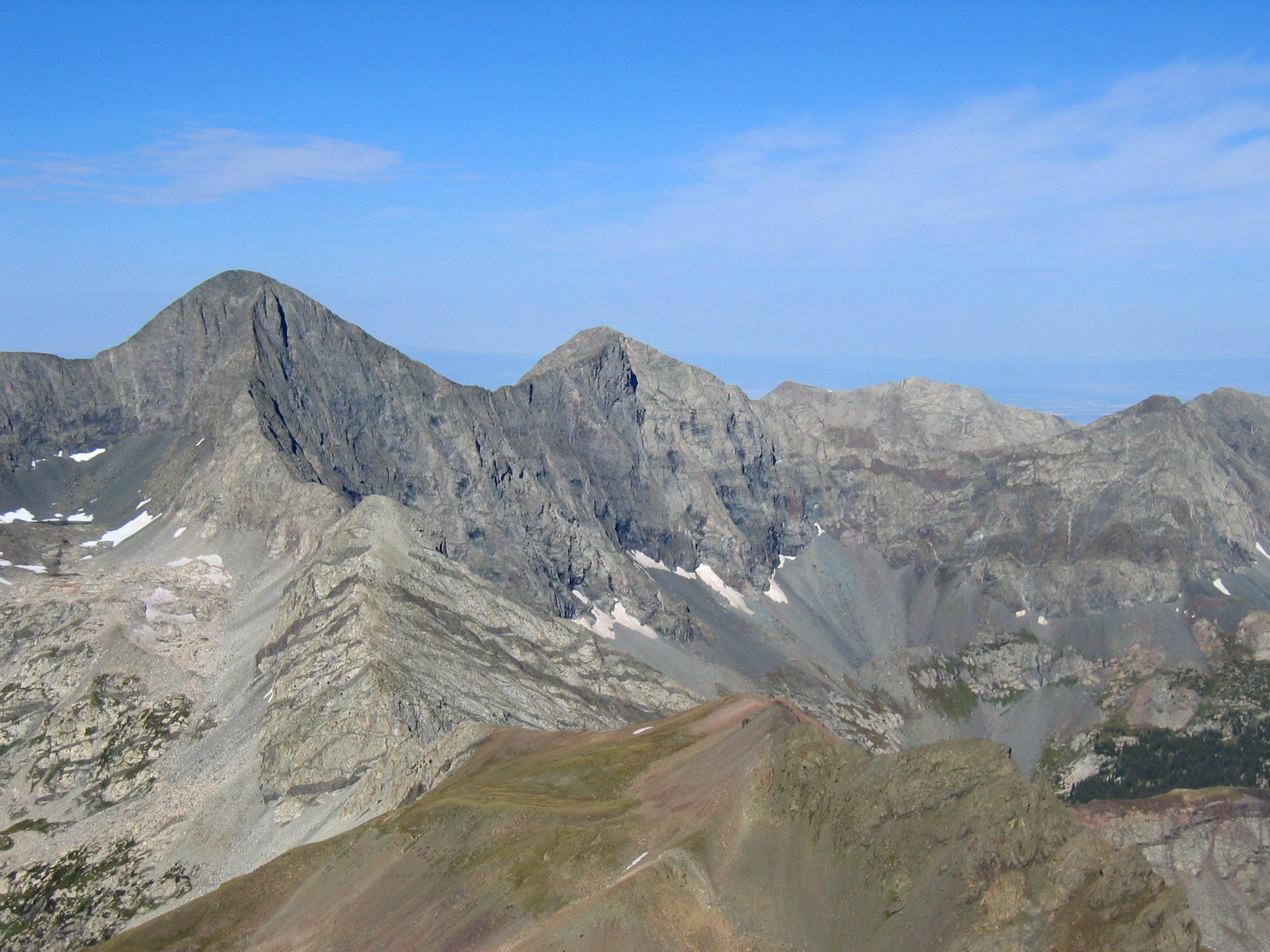
Blanca Peak is the highest peak of the Sangre de Cristo Mountains and the fifth-highest peak of the Rocky Mountains.

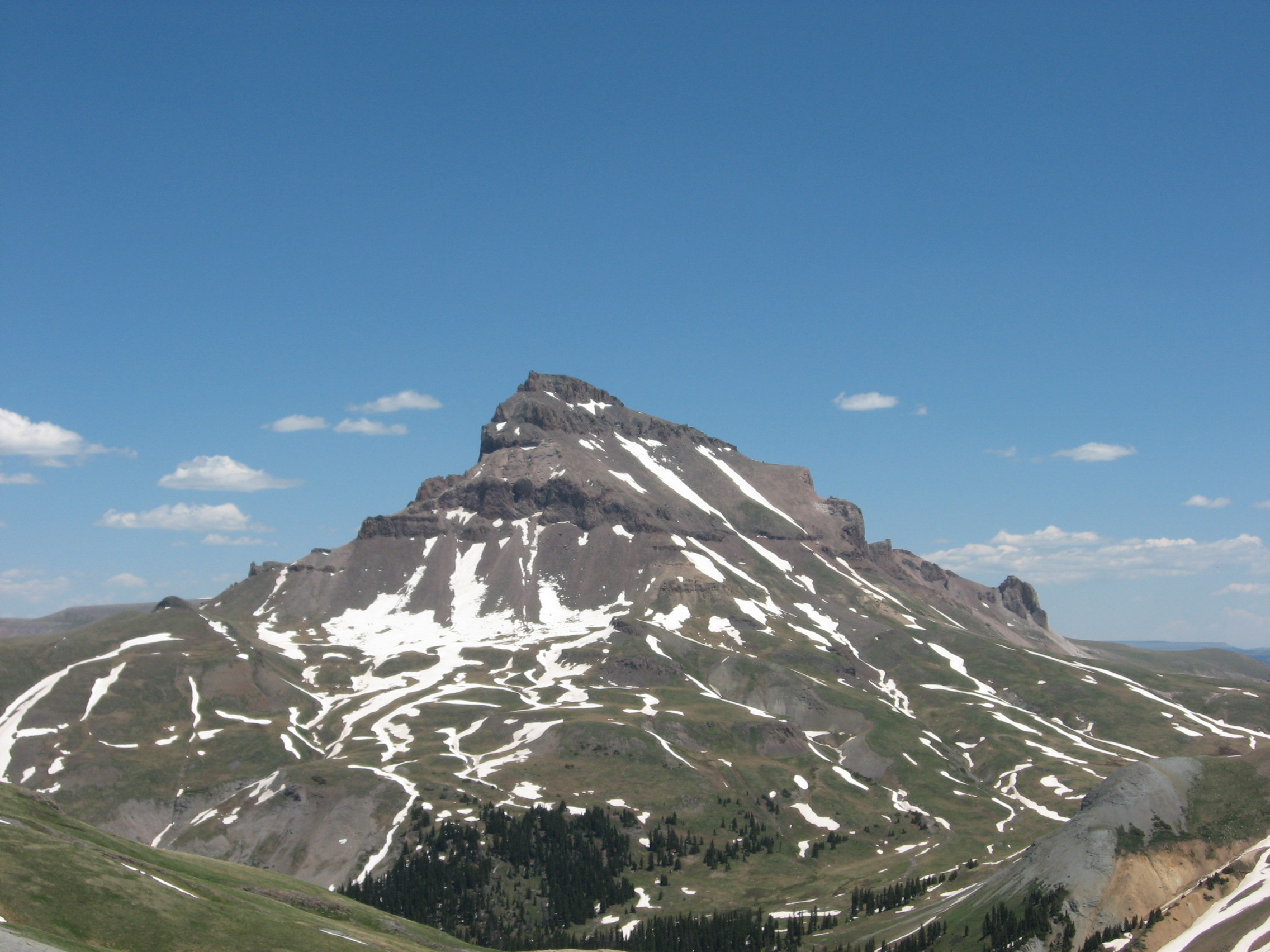
Uncompahgre Peak is the highest peak of the San Juan Mountains and the sixth-highest peak of the Rocky Mountains.

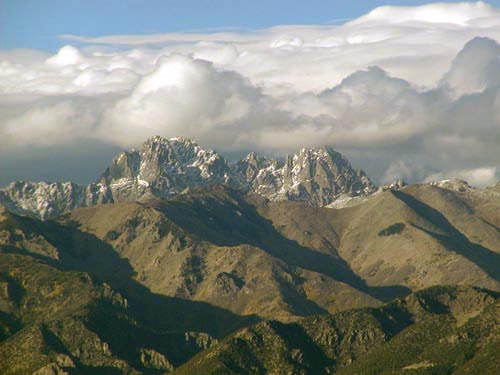
Crestone Peak is the highest peak of the Crestones and the seventh-highest peak of the Rocky Mountains.

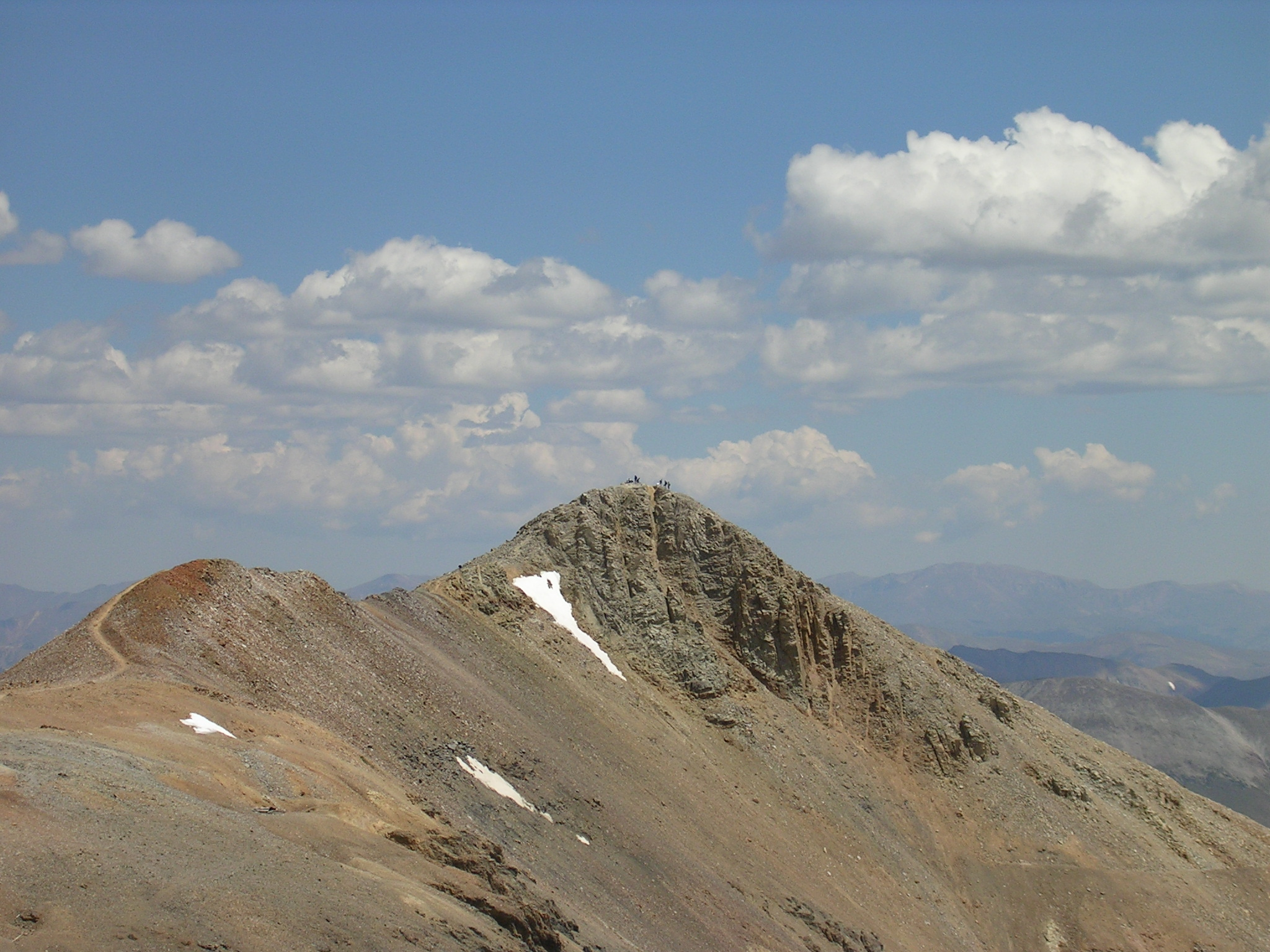
Mount Lincoln is the highest peak of the Mosquito Range and the eighth-highest peak of the Rocky Mountains.

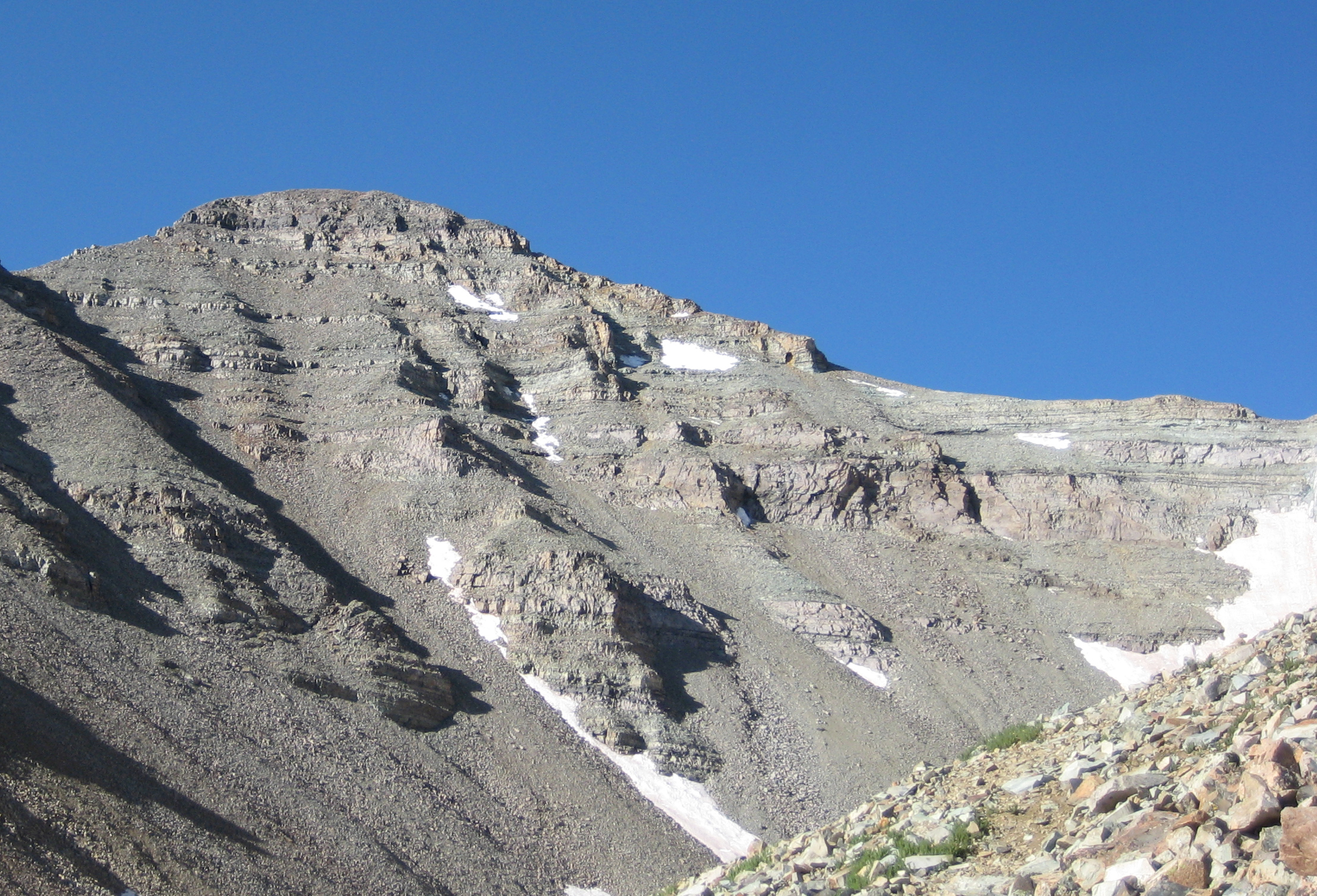
Castle Peak is the highest peak of the Elk Mountains and the ninth-highest peak of the Rocky Mountains.

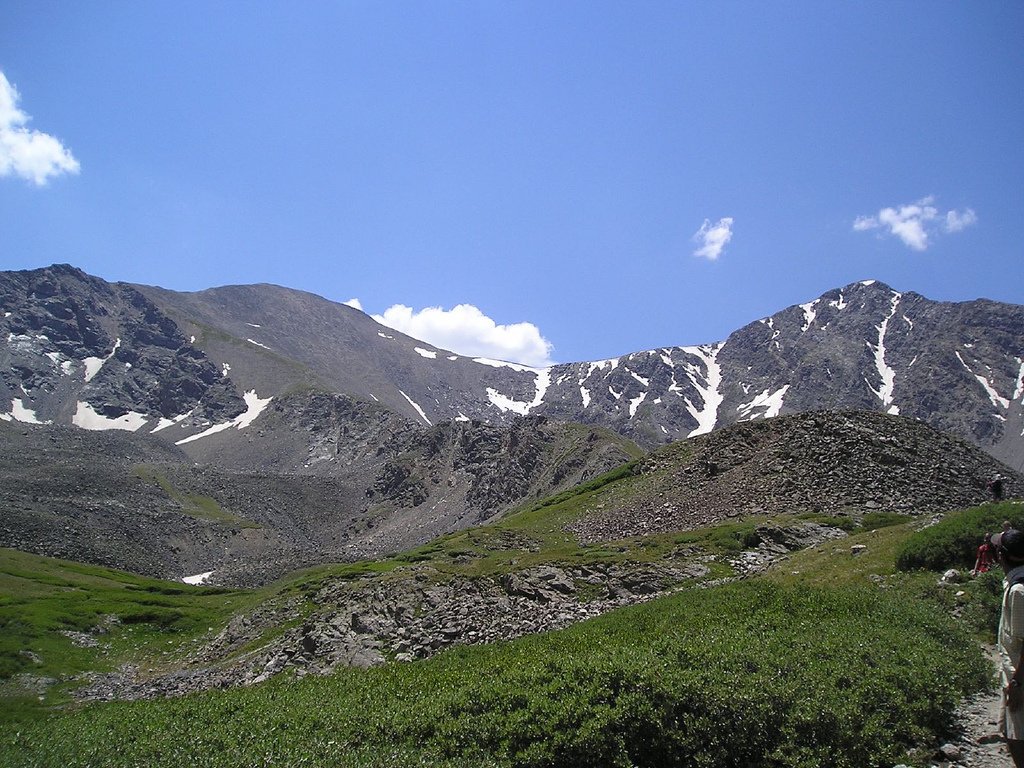
Grays Peak is the highest peak of the Front Range and the tenth-highest peak of the Rocky Mountains.

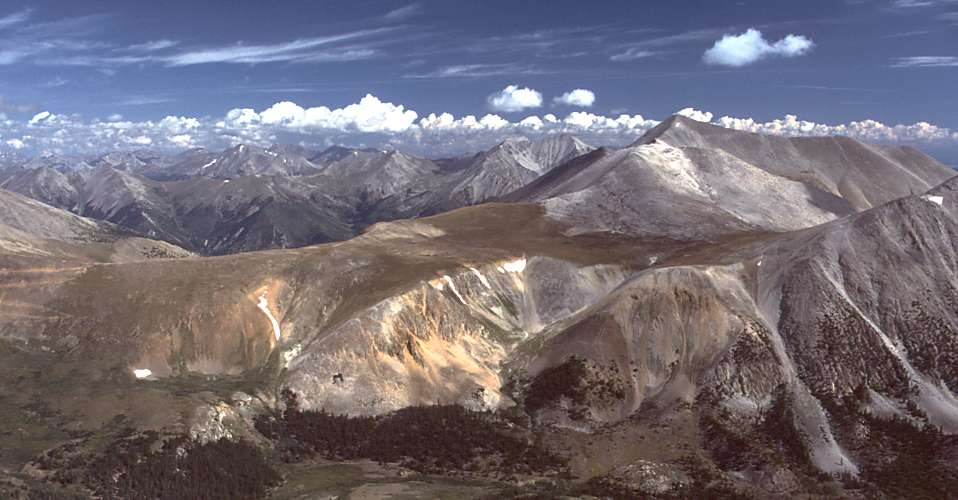
Mount Antero is the highest peak of the Southern Sawatch Range.

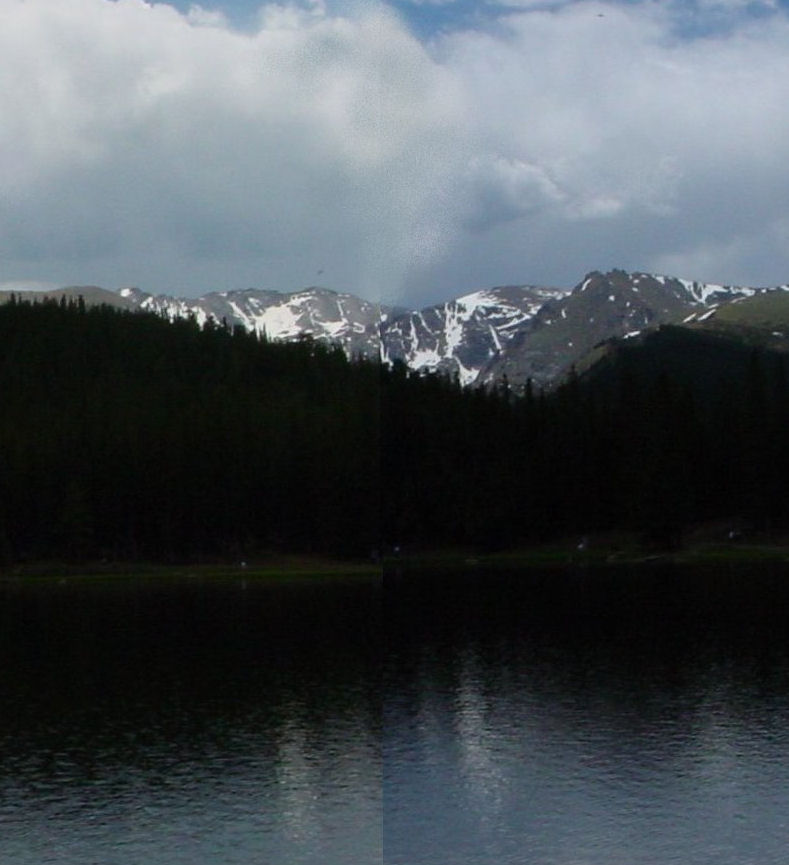
Mount Blue Sky is the highest peak of the Northern Front Range.

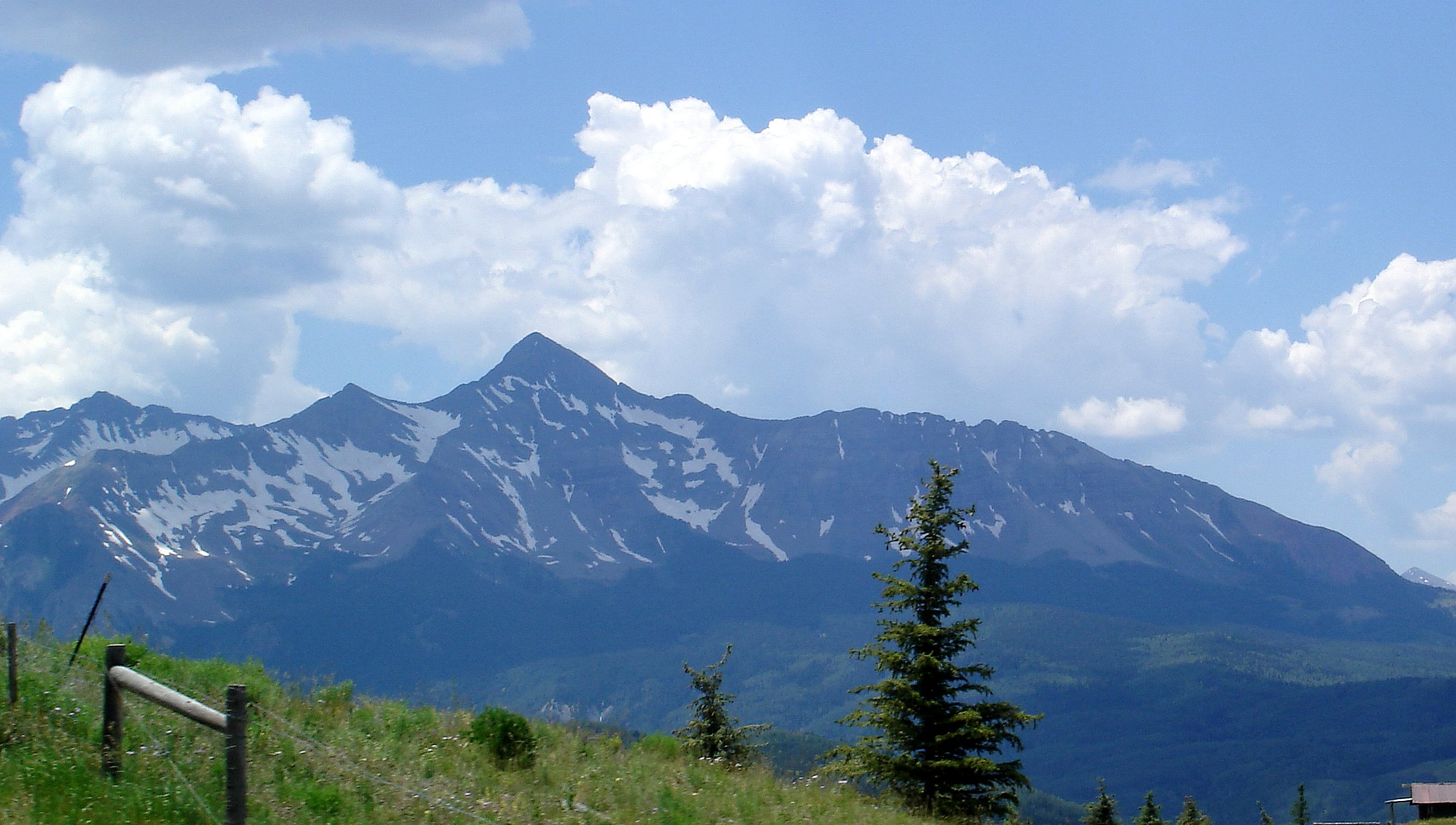
Mount Wilson is the highest peak of the San Miguel Mountains.

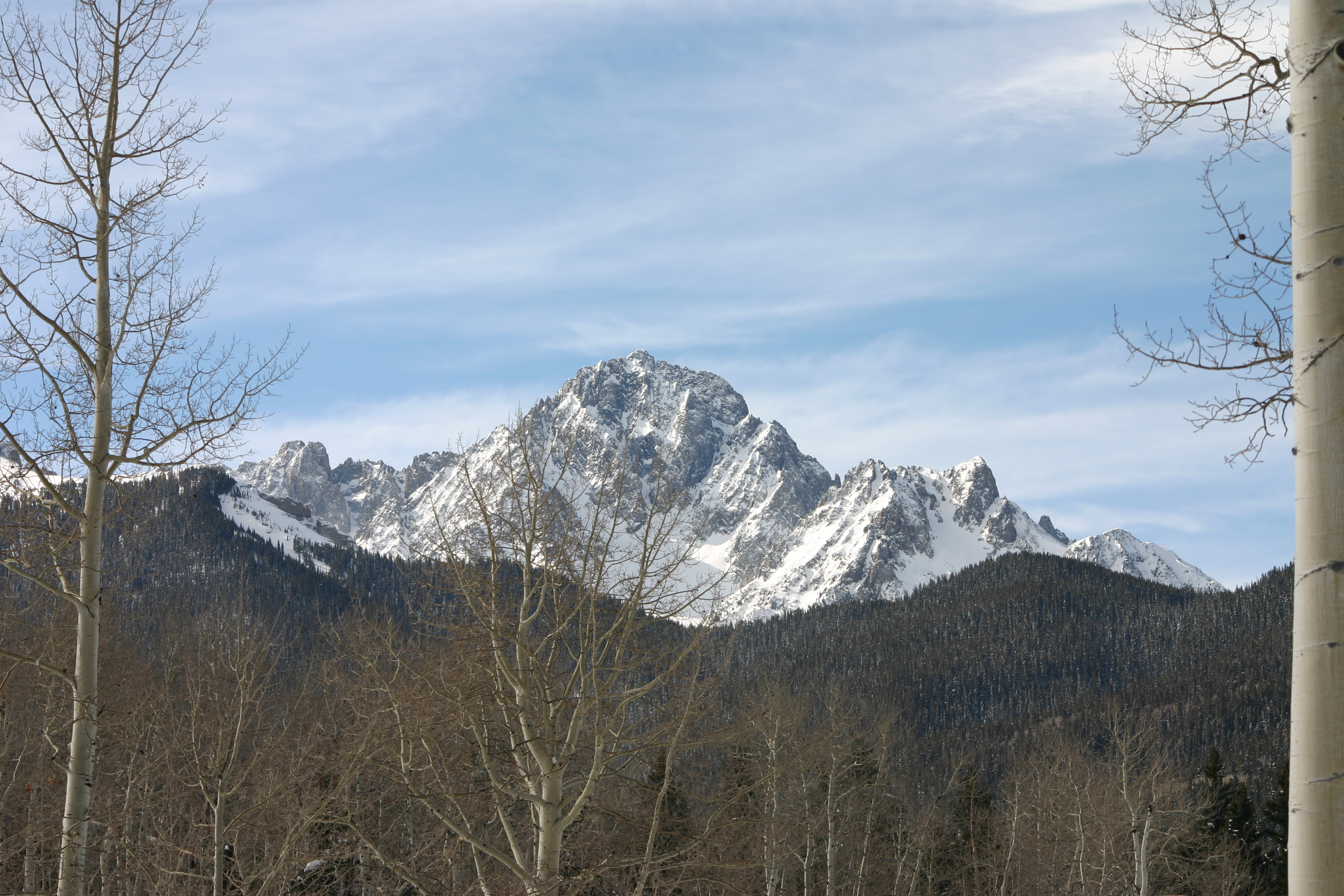
Mount Sneffels is the highest peak of the Sneffels Range.

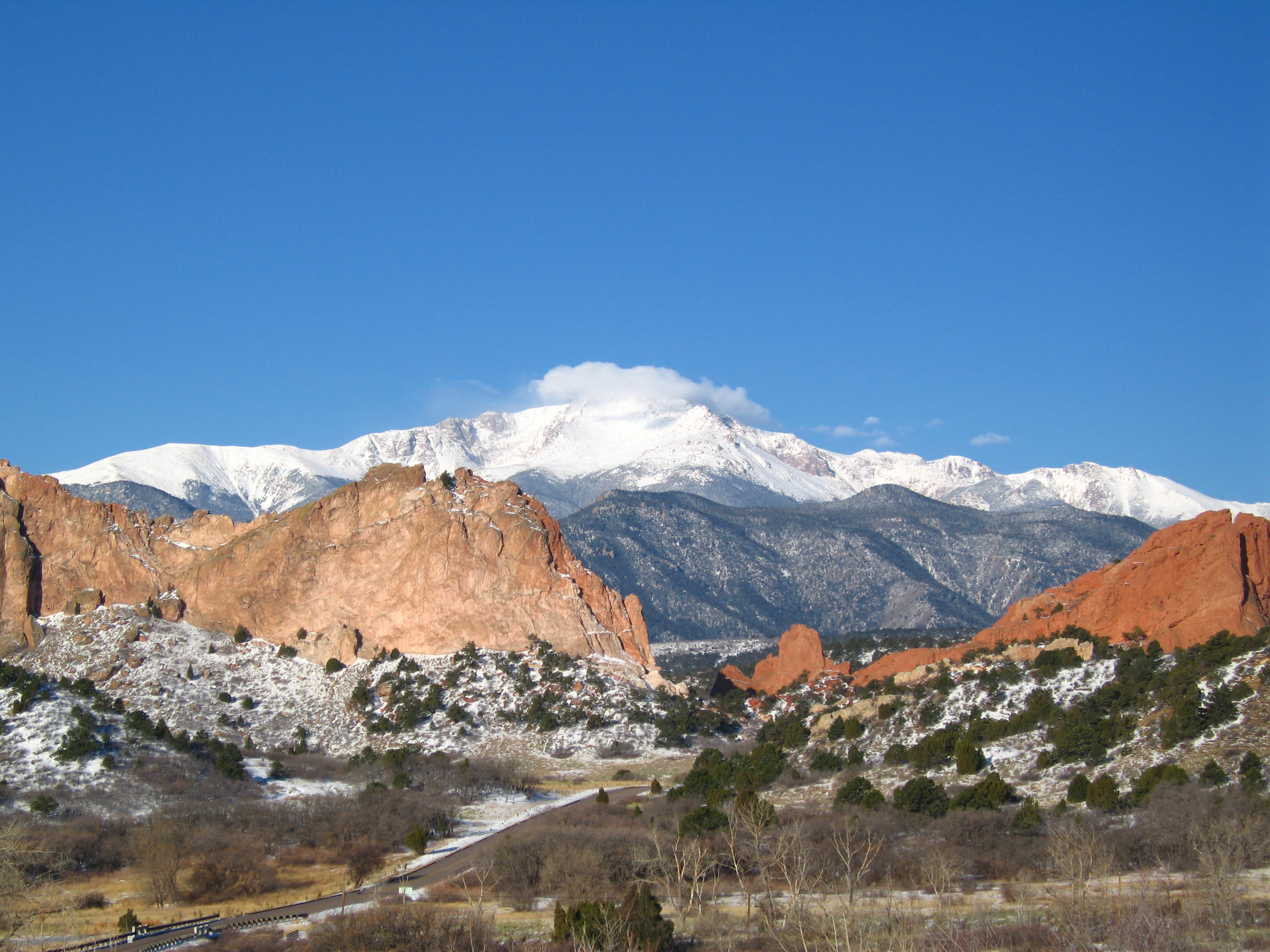
Pikes Peak is the highest peak of the Southern Front Range. The mountain was the inspiration for "America the Beautiful".

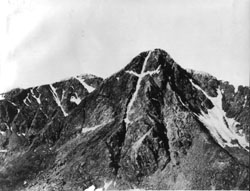
Mount of the Holy Cross is the highest peak of the Northern Sawatch Range. This photograph was taken by William Henry Jackson in 1874.

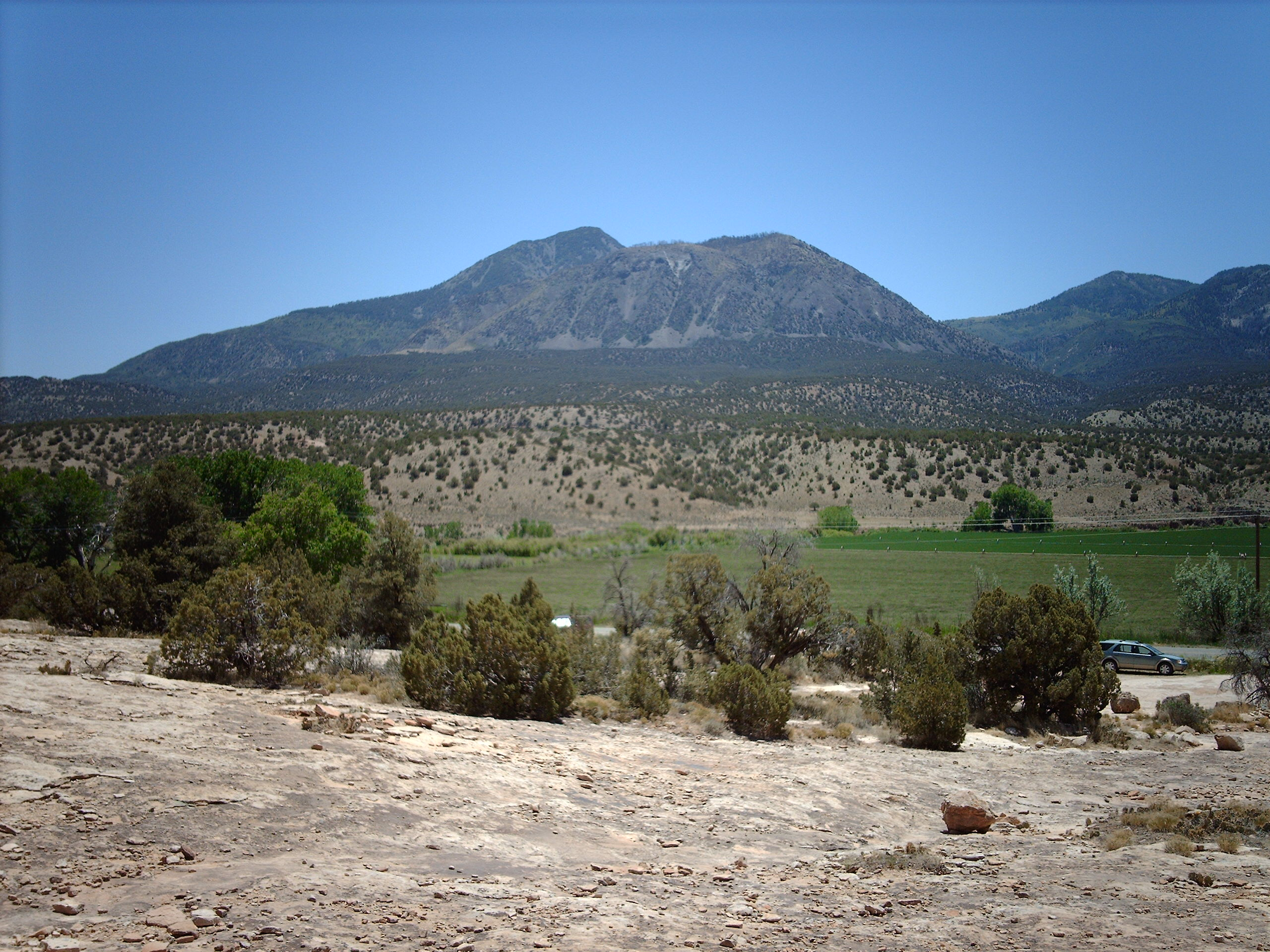
Ute Peak is the highest peak of Ute Mountain.

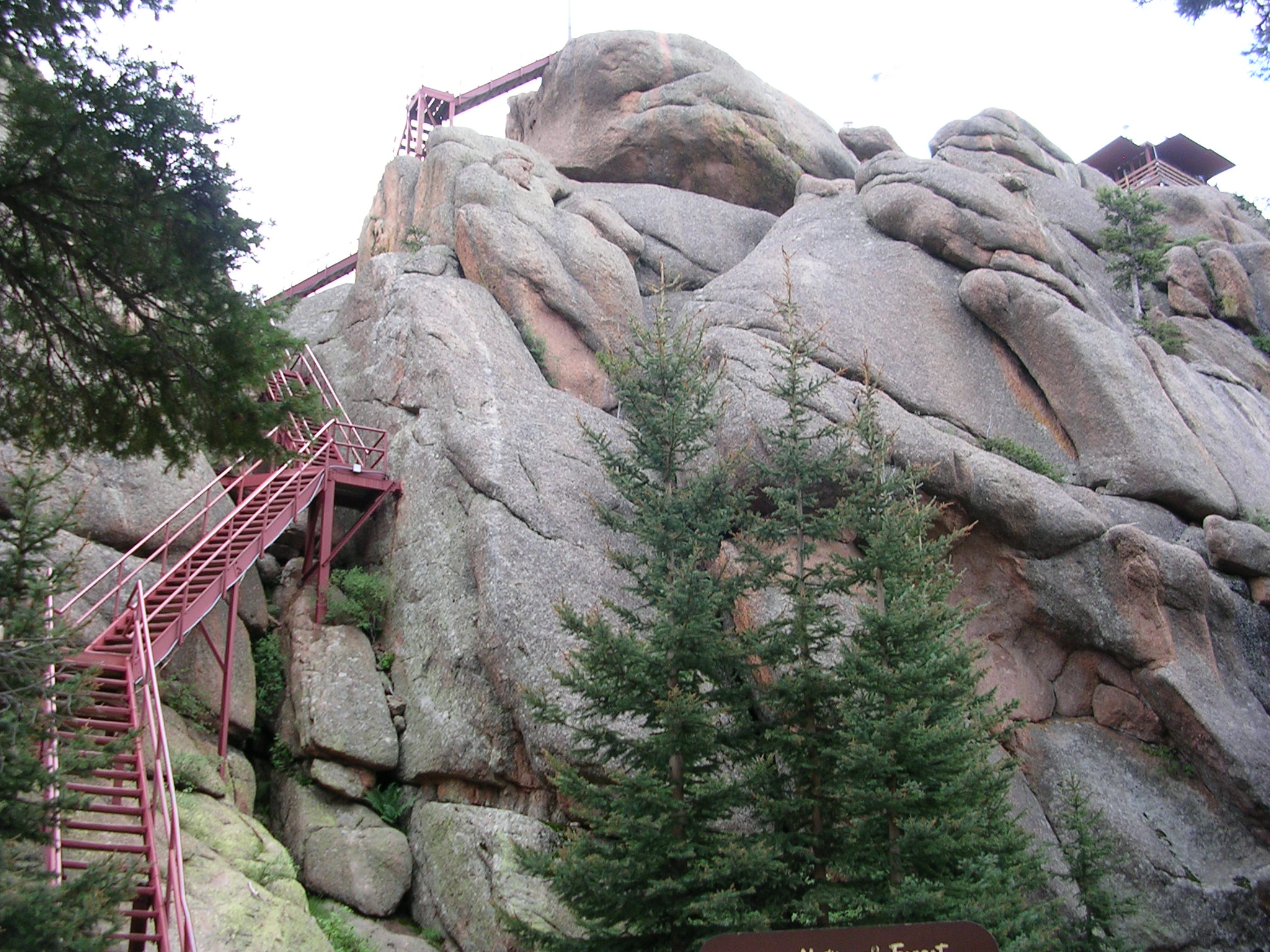
Devils Head is the highest peak of the Rampart Range.

== See also ==
- Southern Rocky Mountains#Mountain ranges
- Bibliography of Colorado
- Geography of Colorado
- History of Colorado
- Index of Colorado-related articles
- List of Colorado-related lists
- Outline of Colorado
