= Blair Mountain (Colorado) =

Mountain in Colorado, United States

- Location within Colorado

Highest point
- Elevation: 11,465 ft (3,495 m)
- Prominence: 1,736 ft (529 m)
- Isolation: 11.50 mi (18.51 km)
- Listing: Colorado prominent summits Colorado range high points
- Coordinates: 39°47′40″N 107°25′03″W

Geography
- Location: Garfield County, Colorado, U.S.
- Parent range: Highest summit of the White River Plateau
- Topo map(s): USGS 7.5' topographic map Blair Mountain, Colorado

Blair Mountain is the highest summit of the White River Plateau in the Rocky Mountains of North America. The prominent 11,465-foot (3,495 m) peak is located in White River National Forest, 17.5 miles (28.2 km) north by west (bearing 344°) of the City of Glenwood Springs in Garfield County, Colorado, United States.

== Mountain ==
Blair Mountain in the White River Forest in Colorado was named for James Allison Blair who had been a Supervisor at White River Forest and died at the age of 52 in 1928. Held in high regard by his superiors for his service, the highest mountain in the area (formerly called 'Old Baldy') was renamed Blair Mountain in James Blair's honor.

== Climate ==
Climate data for Blair Mountain 39.7924 N, 107.4197 W, Elevation: 11,260 ft (3,430 m) (1991–2020 normals)
Month	Jan	Feb	Mar	Apr	May	Jun	Jul	Aug	Sep	Oct	Nov	Dec	Year
Mean daily maximum °F (°C)	26.7 (−2.9)	27.0 (−2.8)	33.0 (0.6)	38.2 (3.4)	47.3 (8.5)	58.3 (14.6)	64.8 (18.2)	62.9 (17.2)	55.2 (12.9)	43.0 (6.1)	33.3 (0.7)	26.2 (−3.2)	43.0 (6.1)
Daily mean °F (°C)	16.1 (−8.8)	15.8 (−9.0)	21.2 (−6.0)	26.4 (−3.1)	35.5 (1.9)	45.9 (7.7)	52.7 (11.5)	51.1 (10.6)	43.8 (6.6)	32.5 (0.3)	23.1 (−4.9)	16.1 (−8.8)	31.7 (−0.2)
Mean daily minimum °F (°C)	5.5 (−14.7)	4.6 (−15.2)	9.4 (−12.6)	14.6 (−9.7)	23.7 (−4.6)	33.5 (0.8)	40.5 (4.7)	39.3 (4.1)	32.4 (0.2)	22.0 (−5.6)	12.9 (−10.6)	6.0 (−14.4)	20.4 (−6.5)
Average precipitation inches (mm)	4.70 (119)	4.48 (114)	4.10 (104)	4.47 (114)	3.36 (85)	1.54 (39)	1.68 (43)	1.99 (51)	2.50 (64)	3.16 (80)	3.78 (96)	4.51 (115)	40.27 (1,024)
Source: PRISM Climate Group

There is a weather station at Bison Lake, near the peak of Blair Mountain.

Climate data for Bison Lake, Colorado (10880ft or 3316m), 1991–2020 normals
Month	Jan	Feb	Mar	Apr	May	Jun	Jul	Aug	Sep	Oct	Nov	Dec	Year
Mean daily maximum °F (°C)	24.0 (−4.4)	26.0 (−3.3)	33.6 (0.9)	39.6 (4.2)	48.5 (9.2)	57.9 (14.4)	64.1 (17.8)	61.6 (16.4)	53.9 (12.2)	42.1 (5.6)	31.0 (−0.6)	23.4 (−4.8)	42.1 (5.6)
Daily mean °F (°C)	16.3 (−8.7)	17.3 (−8.2)	23.6 (−4.7)	29.3 (−1.5)	38.5 (3.6)	47.8 (8.8)	54.3 (12.4)	52.3 (11.3)	45.2 (7.3)	34.1 (1.2)	23.2 (−4.9)	16.0 (−8.9)	33.2 (0.6)
Mean daily minimum °F (°C)	8.6 (−13.0)	8.6 (−13.0)	13.6 (−10.2)	19.0 (−7.2)	28.4 (−2.0)	37.8 (3.2)	44.5 (6.9)	43.0 (6.1)	36.4 (2.4)	25.9 (−3.4)	15.5 (−9.2)	8.4 (−13.1)	24.1 (−4.4)
Average precipitation inches (mm)	4.82 (122)	4.53 (115)	4.16 (106)	4.69 (119)	3.34 (85)	1.58 (40)	1.78 (45)	2.12 (54)	2.70 (69)	3.30 (84)	3.89 (99)	4.72 (120)	41.63 (1,058)
Source 1: XMACIS2
Source 2: NOAA (Precipitation)

== Historical names ==
- Bald
- Bald Mountain
- Baldy
- Blair Mountain – 1928

== See also ==
- List of Colorado mountain ranges
- List of Colorado mountain summits
  - List of Colorado fourteeners
  - List of Colorado 4000 meter prominent summits
  - List of the most prominent summits of Colorado
- List of Colorado county high points
