= South Bald Mountain =

Mountain in Colorado, United States

- Location within Colorado

Highest point
- Elevation: 11,009 ft (3,356 m)
- Prominence: 1,863 ft (568 m)
- Isolation: 8.54 mi (13.74 km)
- Listing: Colorado prominent summits Colorado range high points
- Coordinates: 40°45′10″N 105°41′46″W

Geography
- Location: Larimer County, Colorado, U.S.
- Parent range: Highest summit of the Laramie Mountains
- Topo map(s): USGS 7.5' topographic map South Bald Mountain, Colorado

South Bald Mountain is the highest summit of the Laramie Mountains in the Rocky Mountains of North America. The summit in Roosevelt National Forest southwest of Red Feather Lakes is the highest of five peaks forming Bald Mountain.

== Climate ==
There is no weather station at the summit of South Bald Mountain, but this climate table contains interpolated data for an area around the summit.

Climate data for South Bald Mountain 40.7757 N, 105.7363 W, Elevation: 10,791 ft (3,289 m) (1991–2020 normals)
Month	Jan	Feb	Mar	Apr	May	Jun	Jul	Aug	Sep	Oct	Nov	Dec	Year
Mean daily maximum °F (°C)	26.1 (−3.3)	26.7 (−2.9)	33.3 (0.7)	39.0 (3.9)	49.0 (9.4)	60.3 (15.7)	66.9 (19.4)	64.6 (18.1)	57.2 (14.0)	44.4 (6.9)	33.0 (0.6)	25.9 (−3.4)	43.9 (6.6)
Daily mean °F (°C)	16.1 (−8.8)	16.1 (−8.8)	22.0 (−5.6)	27.3 (−2.6)	36.6 (2.6)	47.0 (8.3)	53.5 (11.9)	51.8 (11.0)	44.8 (7.1)	33.5 (0.8)	23.3 (−4.8)	16.1 (−8.8)	32.3 (0.2)
Mean daily minimum °F (°C)	6.1 (−14.4)	5.4 (−14.8)	10.6 (−11.9)	15.6 (−9.1)	24.2 (−4.3)	33.7 (0.9)	40.0 (4.4)	38.9 (3.8)	32.4 (0.2)	22.6 (−5.2)	13.5 (−10.3)	6.4 (−14.2)	20.8 (−6.2)
Average precipitation inches (mm)	3.03 (77)	3.15 (80)	3.74 (95)	4.92 (125)	3.69 (94)	1.70 (43)	1.77 (45)	1.68 (43)	1.93 (49)	2.85 (72)	3.11 (79)	2.87 (73)	34.44 (875)
Source: PRISM Climate Group

Deadman Hill (Colorado) is a small peak near South Bald Mountain. Deadman Hill has a subalpine climate (Köppen Dfc).

Climate data for Deadman Hill, Colorado, 1991–2020 normals: 10220ft (3115m)
Month	Jan	Feb	Mar	Apr	May	Jun	Jul	Aug	Sep	Oct	Nov	Dec	Year
Mean daily maximum °F (°C)	25.6 (−3.6)	26.8 (−2.9)	34.9 (1.6)	41.9 (5.5)	52.1 (11.2)	61.4 (16.3)	68.0 (20.0)	65.7 (18.7)	57.4 (14.1)	44.3 (6.8)	32.5 (0.3)	25.6 (−3.6)	44.7 (7.0)
Daily mean °F (°C)	16.5 (−8.6)	17.1 (−8.3)	24.0 (−4.4)	30.0 (−1.1)	39.4 (4.1)	47.9 (8.8)	54.2 (12.3)	52.5 (11.4)	45.2 (7.3)	34.0 (1.1)	23.3 (−4.8)	16.4 (−8.7)	33.4 (0.8)
Mean daily minimum °F (°C)	7.4 (−13.7)	7.5 (−13.6)	13.1 (−10.5)	18.1 (−7.7)	26.8 (−2.9)	34.4 (1.3)	40.3 (4.6)	39.2 (4.0)	33.0 (0.6)	23.7 (−4.6)	14.3 (−9.8)	7.2 (−13.8)	22.1 (−5.5)
Average precipitation inches (mm)	2.68 (68)	2.79 (71)	3.42 (87)	4.58 (116)	3.34 (85)	1.65 (42)	1.50 (38)	1.51 (38)	1.87 (47)	2.67 (68)	2.69 (68)	2.46 (62)	31.16 (790)
Source 1: XMACIS2
Source 2: NOAA (Precipitation)

== Historical names ==
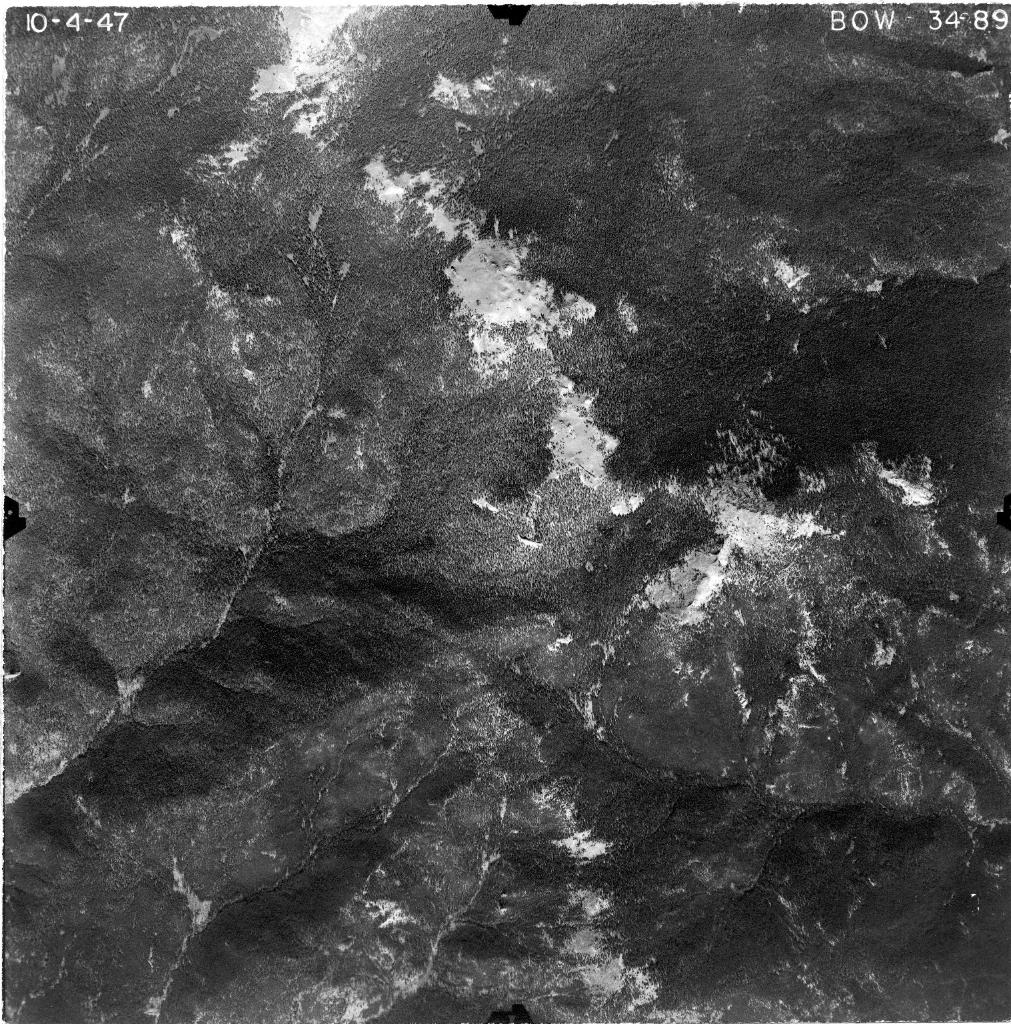
South Bald Mountain (upper-right) as photographed by the United States Forest Service in 1947.

- Bald Mountain
- South Bald Mountain

== See also ==
- List of Colorado mountain ranges
- List of Colorado mountain summits
  - List of Colorado fourteeners
  - List of Colorado 4000 meter prominent summits
  - List of the most prominent summits of Colorado
- List of Colorado county high points
