= Waugh Mountain =

Mountain in Colorado, United States

- Location within Colorado Location within the United States

Highest point
- Elevation: 11,716 ft (3,571 m)
- Prominence: 2,330 ft (710 m)
- Isolation: 18.86 mi (30.35 km)
- Listing: Colorado prominent summits Colorado range high points
- Coordinates: 38°36′07″N 105°41′43″W

Geography
- Location: Fremont County, Colorado, U.S.
- Parent range: Front Range, Highest summit of the South Park Hills
- Topo map(s): USGS 7.5' topographic map Waugh Mountain, Colorado

Waugh Mountain, elevation 11,716 ft (3,571 m), is a summit in Fremont County, Colorado.

== See also ==
- List of Colorado mountain ranges
- List of Colorado mountain summits
  - List of Colorado fourteeners
  - List of Colorado 4000 meter prominent summits
  - List of the most prominent summits of Colorado
- List of Colorado county high points
