= Half Peak =

Mountain in the state of Colorado

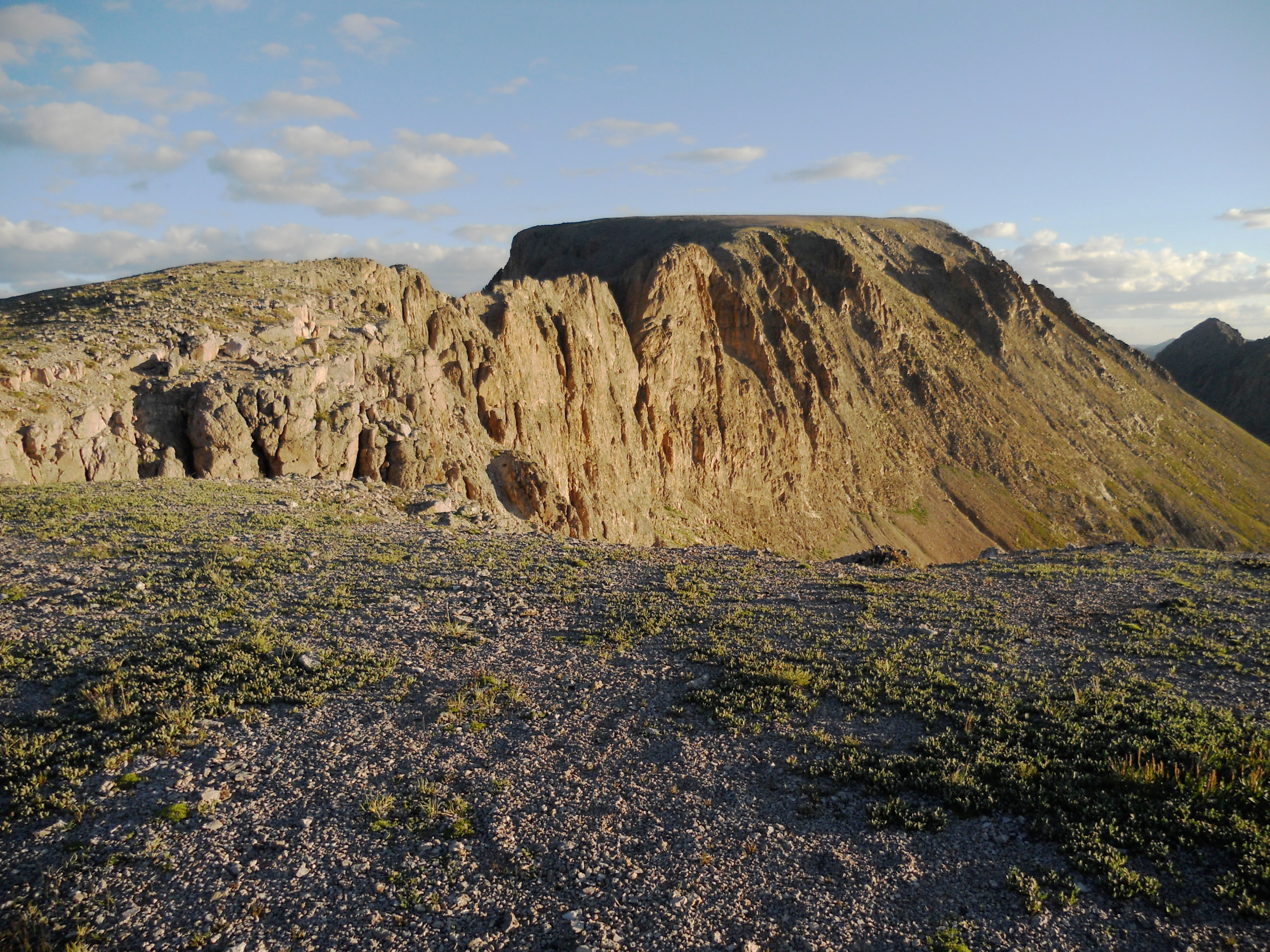
- Half Peak viewed from the south ridge.

Highest point
- Elevation: 13,848 ft (4,221 m)
- Prominence: 1,501 ft (458 m)
- Isolation: 3.89 mi (6.26 km)
- Listing: Colorado range high points
- Coordinates: 37°51′51″N 107°27′58″W

Geography
- Location within Colorado
- Location: Hinsdale County, Colorado, U.S.
- Parent range: San Juan Mountains
- Topo map(s): USGS 7.5' topographic map Pole Creek Mountain, Colorado

Half Peak is the highest summit of the east central San Juan Mountains in the Rocky Mountains of North America.

== Location ==
The 13,848-foot (4,221 m) thirteener is located in Gunnison National Forest, 14.3 miles (23.0 km) southwest by south (bearing 216°) of the Town of Lake City in Hinsdale County, Colorado, United States.

== See also ==
- List of Colorado mountain ranges
- List of Colorado mountain summits
  - List of Colorado fourteeners
  - List of Colorado 4000 meter prominent summits
  - List of the most prominent summits of Colorado
- List of Colorado county high points
