= Horsefly Peak =

Mountain in the state of Colorado

- Location within Colorado

Highest point
- Elevation: 10,353 ft (3,156 m)
- Prominence: 1,437 ft (438 m)
- Isolation: 13.04 mi (20.99 km)
- Listing: Colorado range high points
- Coordinates: 38°11′37″N 107°55′54″W

Geography
- Location: Ouray County, Colorado, U.S.
- Parent range: Highest summit of the Uncompahgre Plateau
- Topo map(s): USGS 7.5' topographic map Horsefly Peak, Colorado

Climbing
- Easiest route: hike

Horsefly Peak is the highest summit of the Uncompahgre Plateau in the Rocky Mountains of North America. The 10,353-foot (3,156 m) peak is located 10.0 miles (16.1 km) west by north (bearing 284°) of the Town of Ridgway in Ouray County, Colorado, United States.

== See also ==
- List of Colorado mountain ranges
- List of Colorado mountain summits
  - List of Colorado fourteeners
  - List of Colorado 4000 meter prominent summits
  - List of the most prominent summits of Colorado
- List of Colorado county high points
