= Ptarmigan Peak (Colorado) =

Mountain in the state of Colorado

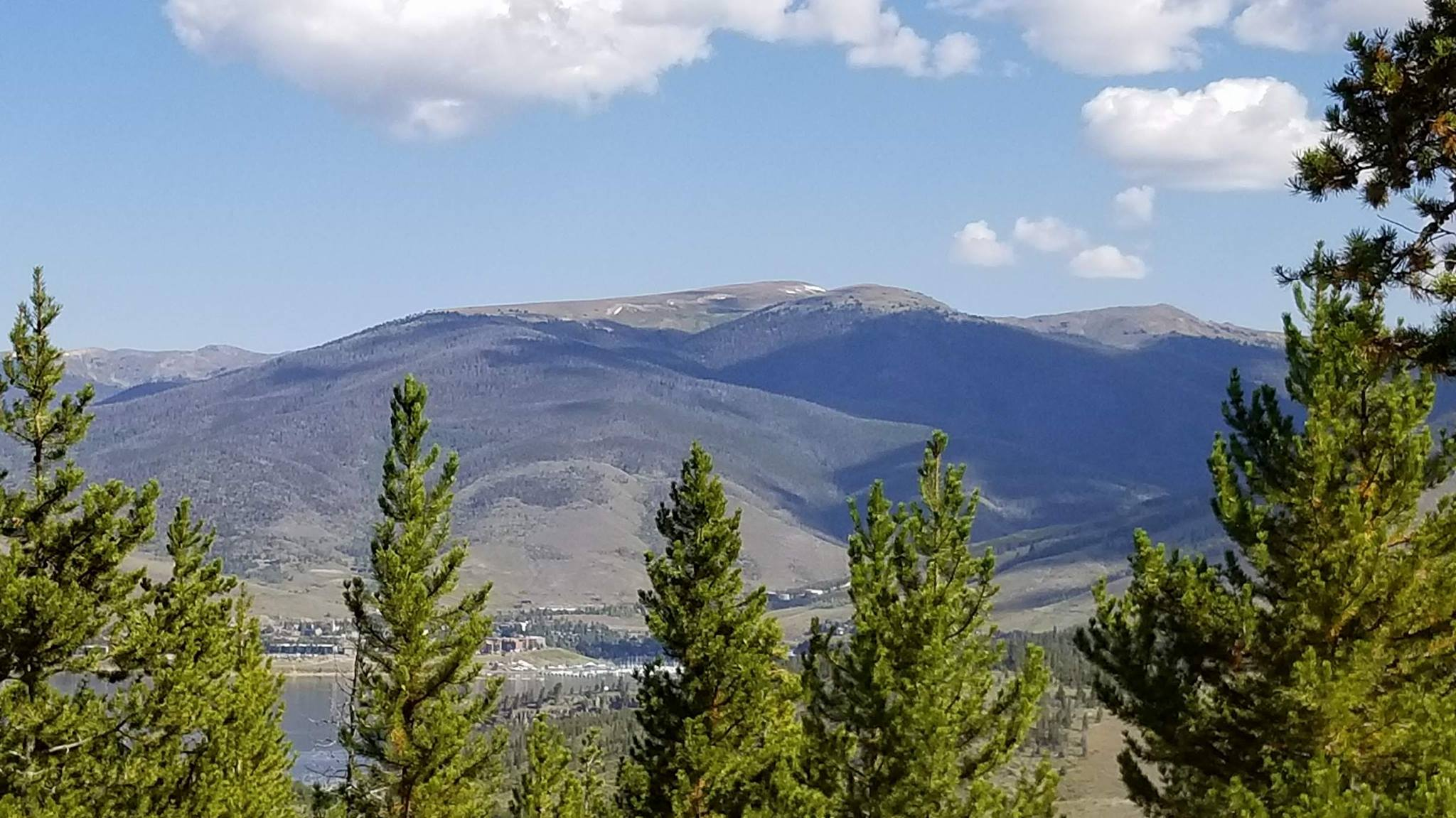
- Ptarmigan Peak viewed from Sapphire Point

Highest point
- Elevation: 12,504 ft (3,811 m)
- Prominence: 721 ft (220 m)
- Isolation: 4.30 mi (6.92 km)
- Listing: Colorado range high points
- Coordinates: 39°41′27″N 106°01′34″W

Geography
- Location within Colorado
- Location: Grand and Summit counties, Colorado, United States
- Parent range: Front Range, Highest summit of the South Williams Fork Mountains
- Topo map(s): USGS 7.5' map Dillon, Colorado

Climbing
- Easiest route: hike

Ptarmigan Peak is the highest summit of the South Williams Fork Mountains range in the Rocky Mountains of North America. The peak is north of Dillon, CO in the White River National Forest.

== See also ==
- List of Colorado mountain ranges
- List of Colorado mountain summits
  - List of Colorado fourteeners
  - List of Colorado 4000 meter prominent summits
  - List of the most prominent summits of Colorado
- List of Colorado county high points
