= Laramie Mountains =

Mountain range in Wyoming and Colorado, United States

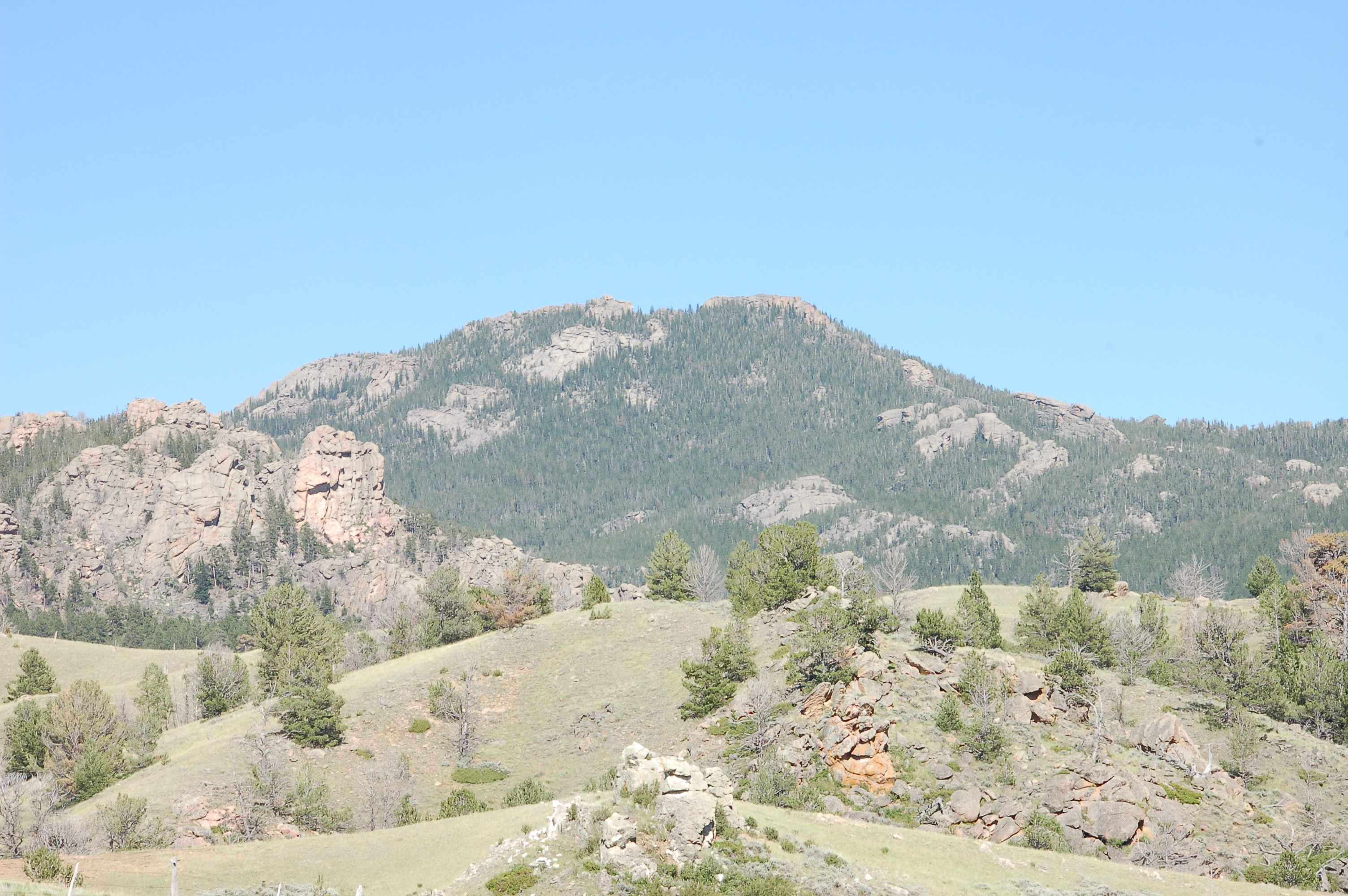
- Southern face of Laramie Peak

Highest point
- Peak: South Bald Mountain
- Elevation: 11,007 ft (3,355 m)
- Listing: Mountain ranges of Colorado

Geography
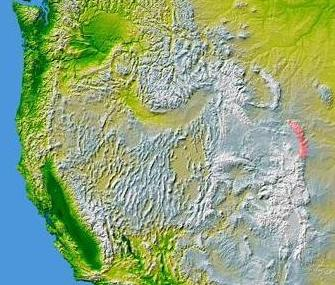
- The Laramie Mountains are shown highlighted in pink on a map of the western U.S.
- Country: United States
- States: Wyoming; Colorado
- Parent range: Rocky Mountains

The Laramie Mountains are a range of moderately high peaks on the eastern edge of the Rocky Mountains in the U.S states of Wyoming and Colorado. The range is the northernmost extension of the line of the ranges along the eastern side of the Rockies, and in particular of the higher peaks of the Front Range directly to the south. North of the range, the gap between the Laramie range and the Bighorn Mountains provided the route for historical trails, such as the Oregon Trail, the Mormon Trail, and the Pony Express.

The Laramie Mountains begin in northern Colorado and extend discontinuously into southeastern Wyoming between Cheyenne and Laramie and northward to Casper. (By some definitions the Laramies are only in Wyoming.) They are named after the Laramie River, which cuts through the range from southwest to northeast and joins the North Platte River east of the range in eastern Wyoming. The mountains in turn give their name to the Laramide orogeny, the uplift of the North American Plate approximately 70 million years ago that created the present Rocky Mountains.

The highest portions of the Laramie mountains are mostly in public ownership, forming part of the Medicine Bow-Routt and Roosevelt National Forests.

== Geography ==
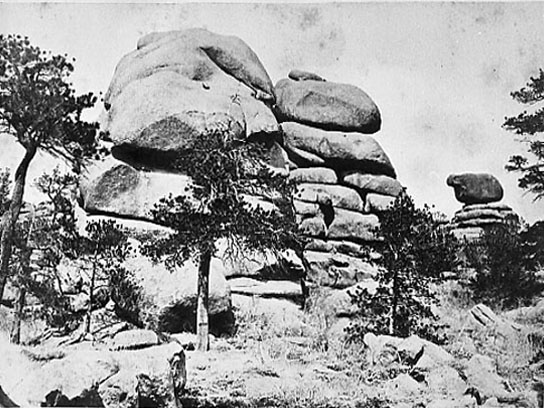
Laramie Mountains, c. 1869

The mountains consist of a series of Precambrian Sherman granite monadnocks rising above a broad erosion surface that form extensive unwooded parks whose surfaces are generally at about 7,000 feet (2,100 m) above sea level. The high peaks of the range, which are much lower than those commonly associated with the Rocky Mountains, rise abruptly above the surrounding peneplain to altitudes between 8,000 feet (2,400 m) and 9,500 feet (2,900 m) above sea level, with the exceptions of Laramie Peak in Wyoming which tops out at 10,274 feet (3,132 m) and South Bald Mountain in Colorado rising to 11,007 feet (3,355 m). The granitic soils were formed from the erosion of the surrounding monadnocks and have an effective depth of less than 12 inches (30 cm).

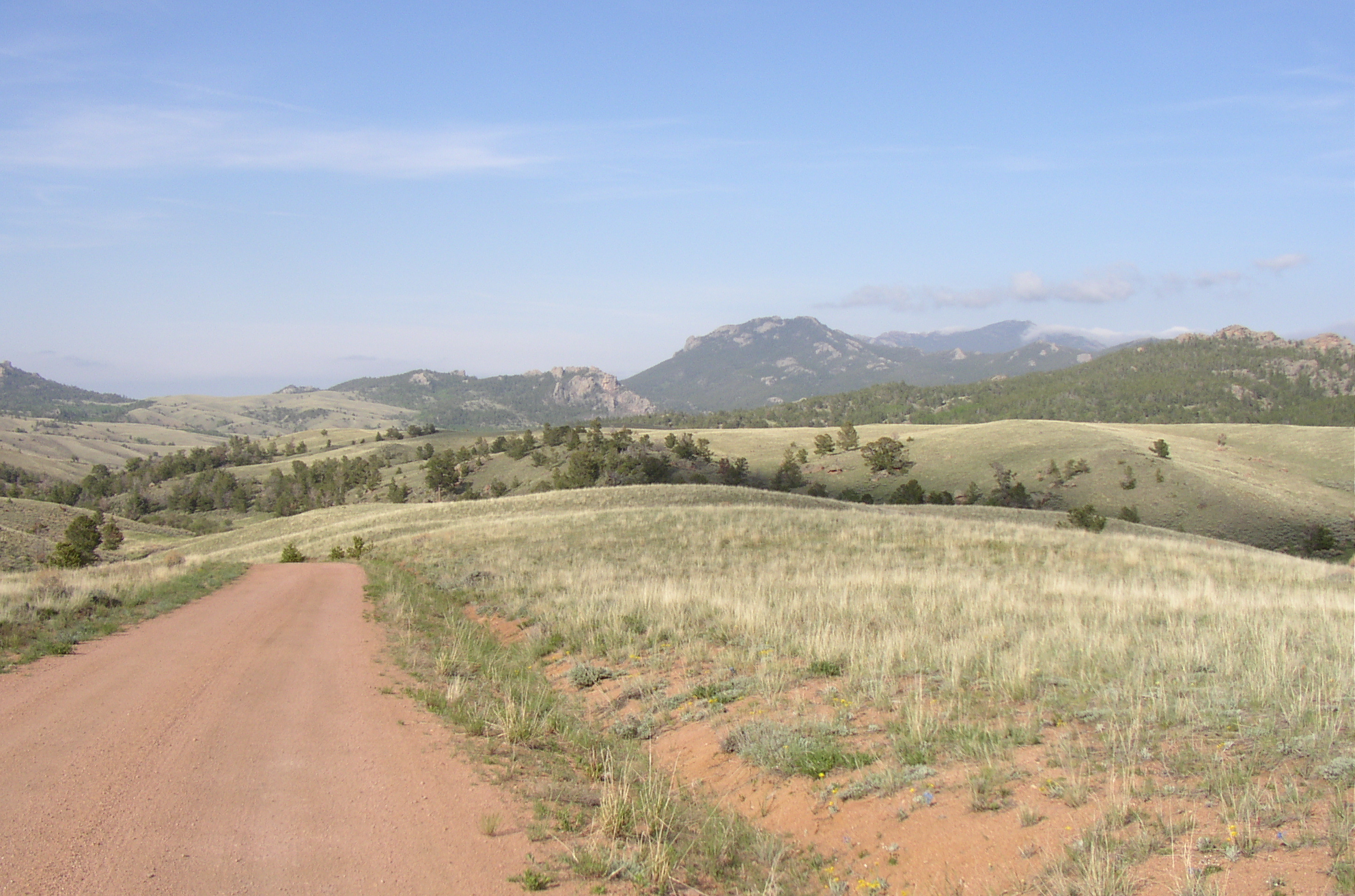
Laramie Mountains close to Esterbrook

Three principal life zones are represented in the Laramies: Upper Sonoran, Transition and Canadian. Some early sources indicated that the Hudsonian Zone occurs on Laramie Peak but there is nothing distinctive about either the flora or fauna on the top of this peak, for it consists of nothing but a large granite outcrop. On the eastern and north eastern slopes of the range the prairie/mountain transition is very gentle at the south end (between Cheyenne and Laramie) and much more abrupt and broken farther north. The elevation is lowest, about 4,500 feet (1,400 m) (1370 m), along the North Platte River. On the western slopes the total relief is much less, as the floors of the three intermontane basins that border the Laramies on this side (Shirley, Hanna and Laramie basins) rarely drop below 7,000 feet (2,100 m). An extensive high plain and semi-desert extends from the Laramie Mountains south west as far as the Shirley Mountains. The Laramie Basin separates the Laramie Mountains from the Medicine Bow Mountains to the south and west, and its floor is above 7,000 feet (2,100 m) except for a few depressions and blowouts (such as Cooper Lake).

The Laramie Mountains are bisected by the Laramie River, which cuts a canyon through the mountains roughly due west of Wheatland, and then continues its generally eastward course to join the North Platte River near the town of Fort Laramie. The division marks the southern end of the continuous coniferous forest in the range, and separates the range into two parts. The southern part is generally drier and much more open, with little or no forest except for the southern end at Pole Mountain and surrounding area, where the interesting granite outcrops at Vedauwoo provide climbing practice and grand picnic scenery.

The range is prominently visible from Interstate 25 between Casper and Cheyenne. Interstate 80 and the Union Pacific Railroad cross the range between Cheyenne and Laramie on an outlying ramp of the High Plains called the "Gangplank".41°05′56″N 105°06′46″W

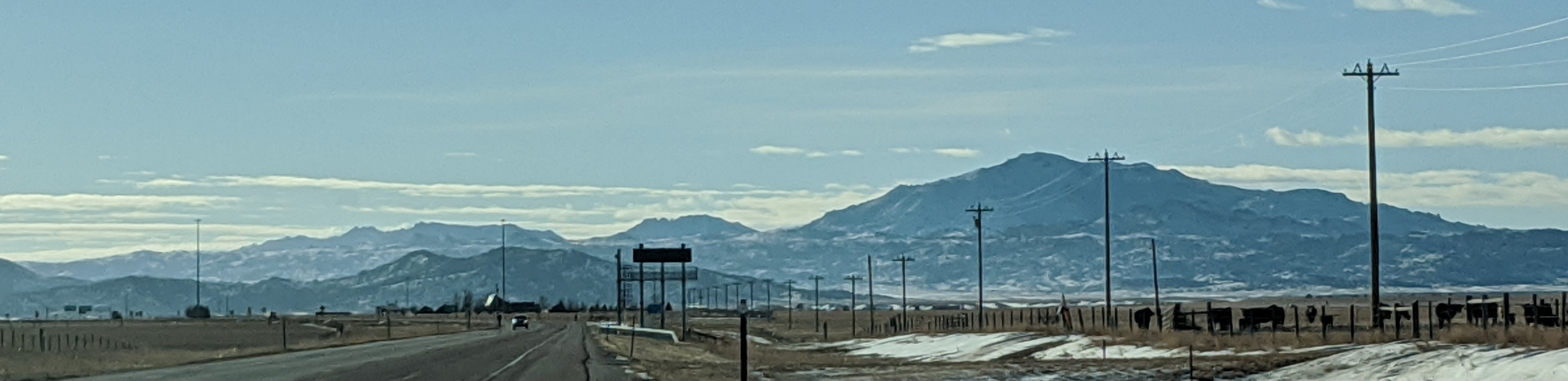
Laramie Mountains viewed from 40 miles West on U.S. Route 26. From right to left: Laramie peak, South Mountain, and Bearhead Mountain.

== See also ==
- Geography of Wyoming
- Laramide Belt — of the North American Cordillera
