= Laramie Peak =

Mountain in Wyoming, United States

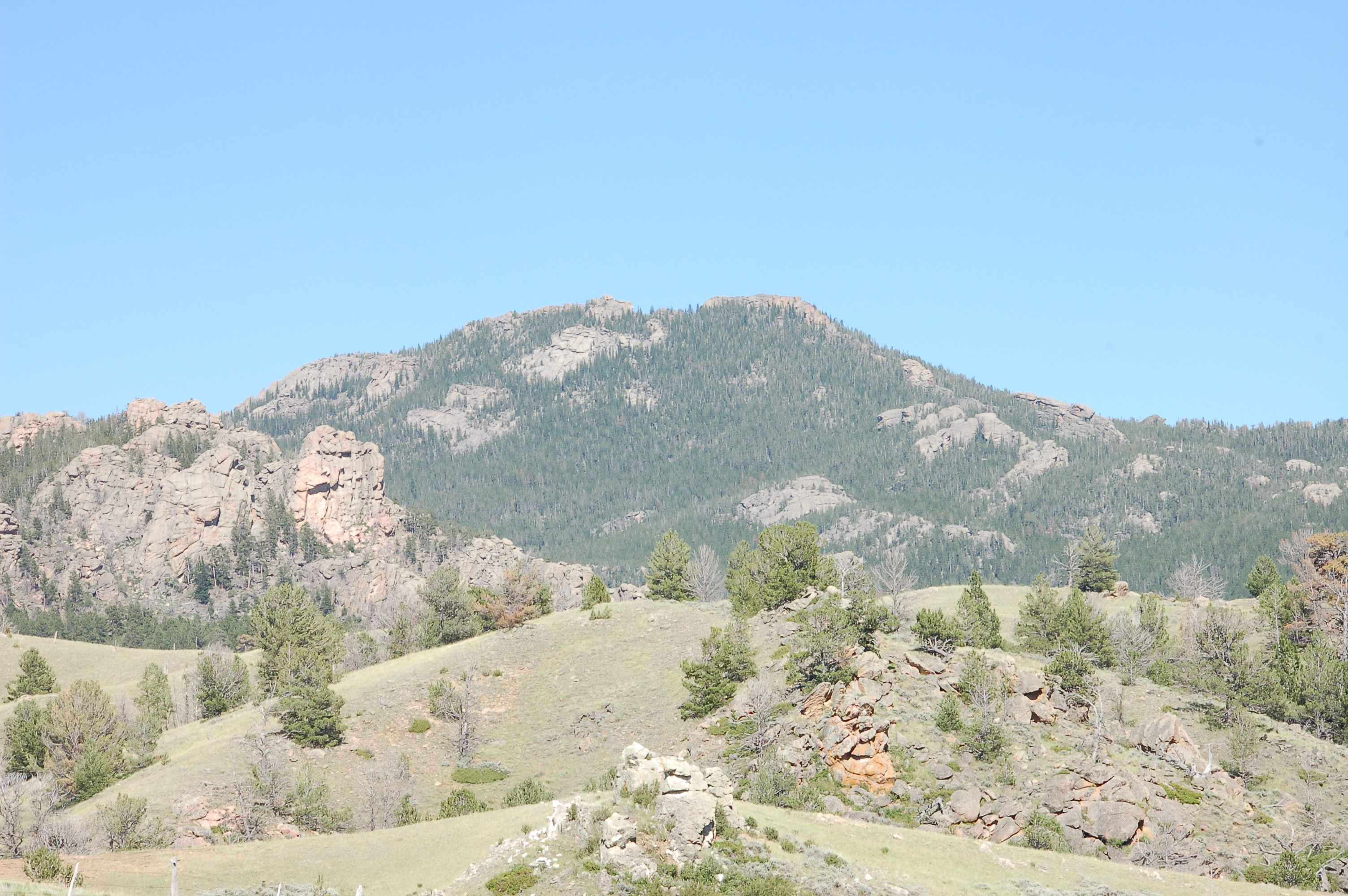
- Southern face of Laramie Peak

Highest point
- Elevation: 10,275 ft (3,132 m)
- Prominence: 3,312 ft (1,009 m)
- Coordinates: 42°16′04″N 105°26′31″W

Geography
- Location: Albany County, Wyoming, U.S.
- Parent range: Laramie Range
- Topo map: USGS Laramie Peak

Laramie Peak Is the highest and most prominent peak in the Laramie Range of Wyoming. With a peak elevation of 10,275 feet (3,132 m), it is the only peak in the Laramie Range to exceed an elevation of 10,000 feet (3,000 m). It can be seen from great distances from both sides of the Laramie Range including from around 100 miles (160 km) away at the top of the Scotts Bluff National Monument in Nebraska and in the Wyoming towns of Wheatland, Douglas, Rock River, and immediately outside the cities of Laramie and Cheyenne.

== Name ==
The mountain was named for Jacques La Ramee, a French-Canadian fur trader who lived in the area in the 1820s and who was found dead at the Laramie River.

== History ==
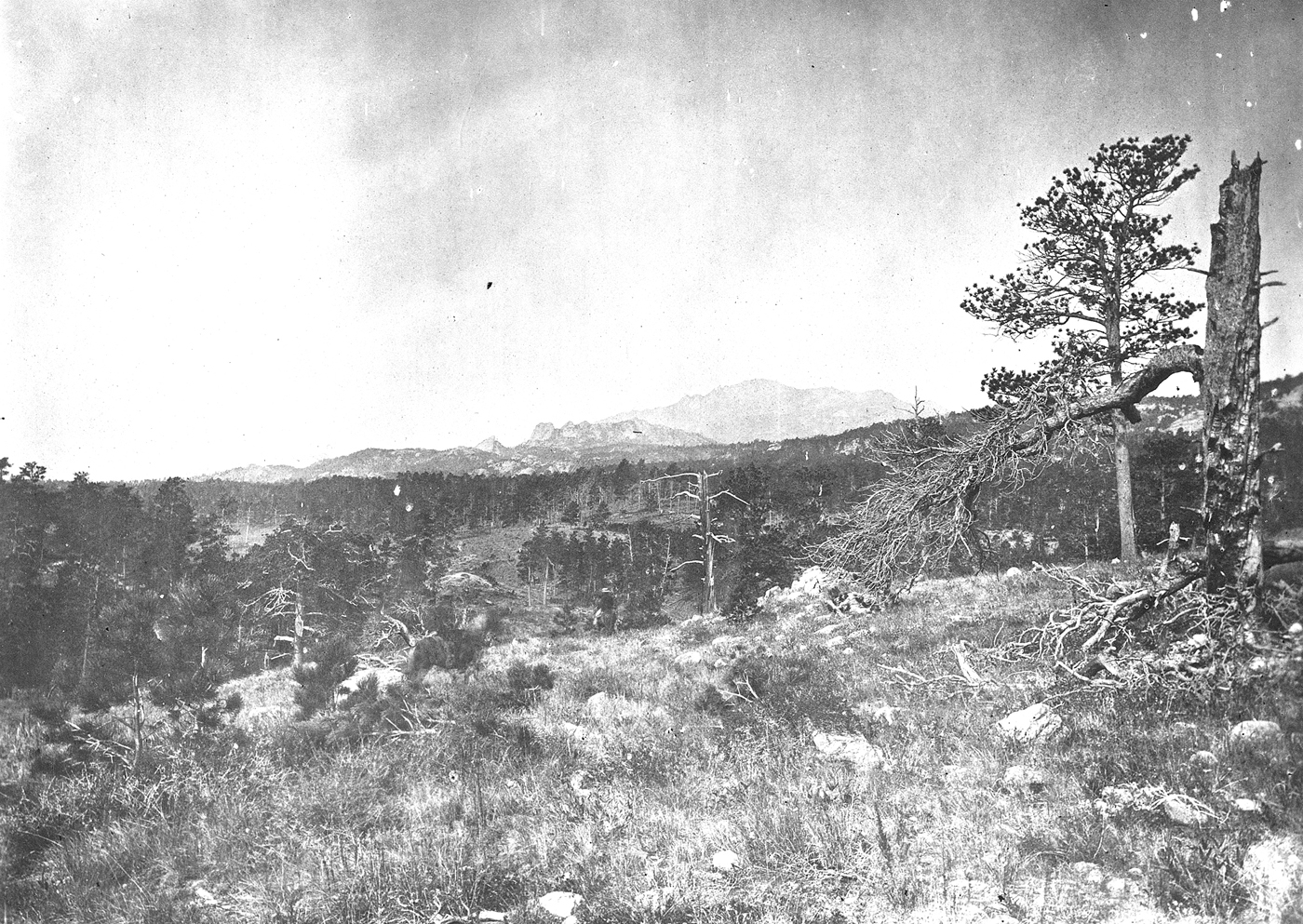
Laramie Peak from near the head of the Big Cottonwood, Albany County, Wyoming, 1870

Laramie Peak was an important landmark for the settlers on the Oregon Trail and the Mormon Trail. After reaching Scotts Bluff the top of the mountain was visible at the horizon. For more than one week the mountain guided the people on the track and signaled the end of the relatively flat part of the way, reaching the Rocky Mountains.

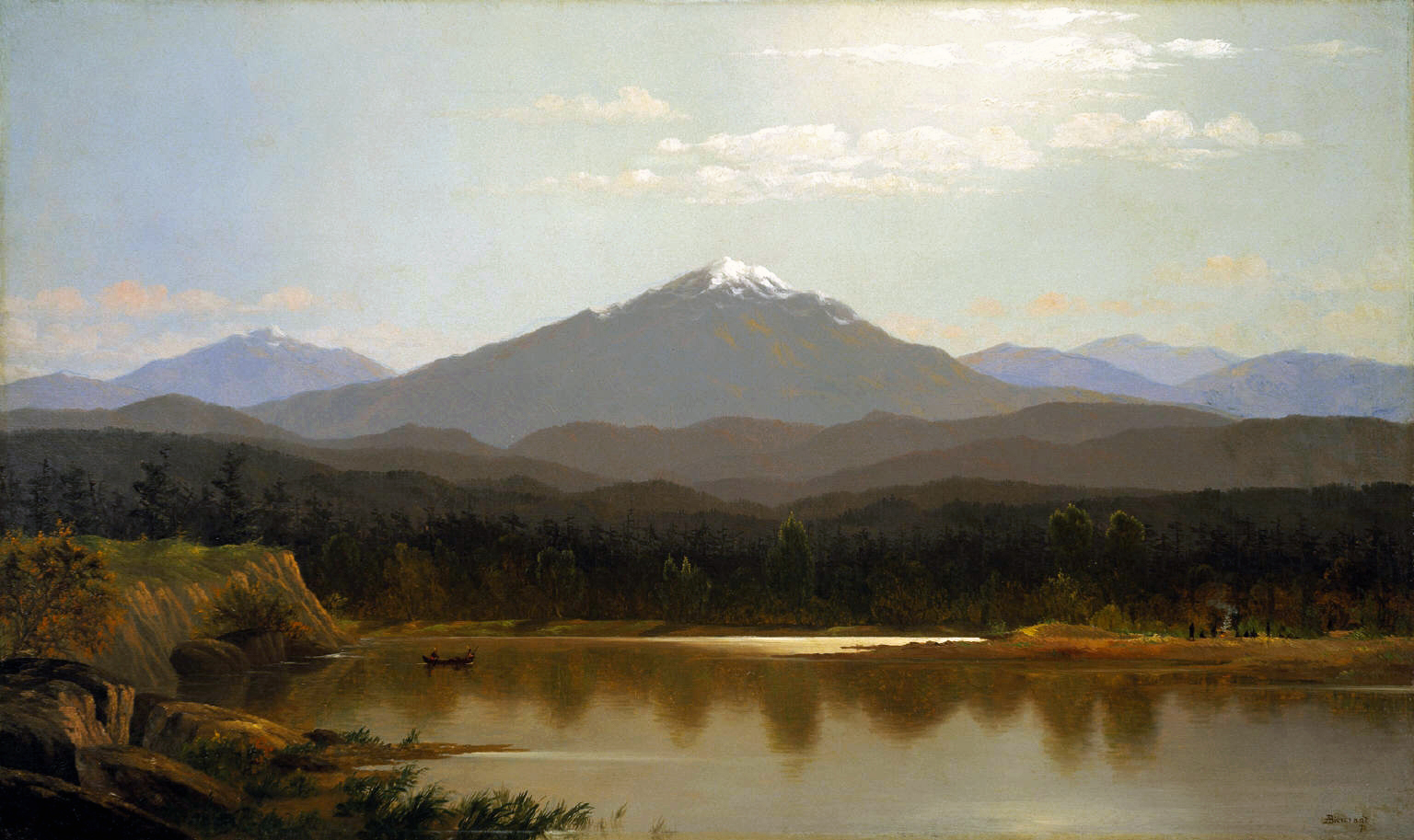
Albert Bierstadt, Laramie Peak, 1870

Mark Twain wrote in his 1871 book Roughing It about the hill: "We passed Fort Laramie in the night, and on the seventh morning out we found ourselves in the Black Hills, with Laramie Peak at our elbow (apparently) looming vast and solitary -- a deep, dark, rich indigo blue in hue, so portentously did the old colossus frown under his beetling brows of storm-cloud. He was thirty or forty miles away, in reality, but he only seemed removed a little beyond the low ridge at our right."

== Usage ==
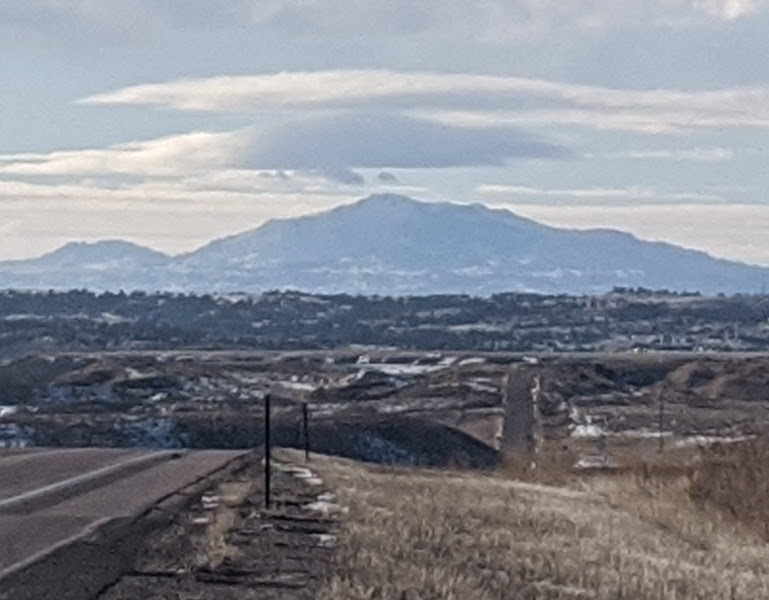
East facing side of Laramie Peak from 40 miles away

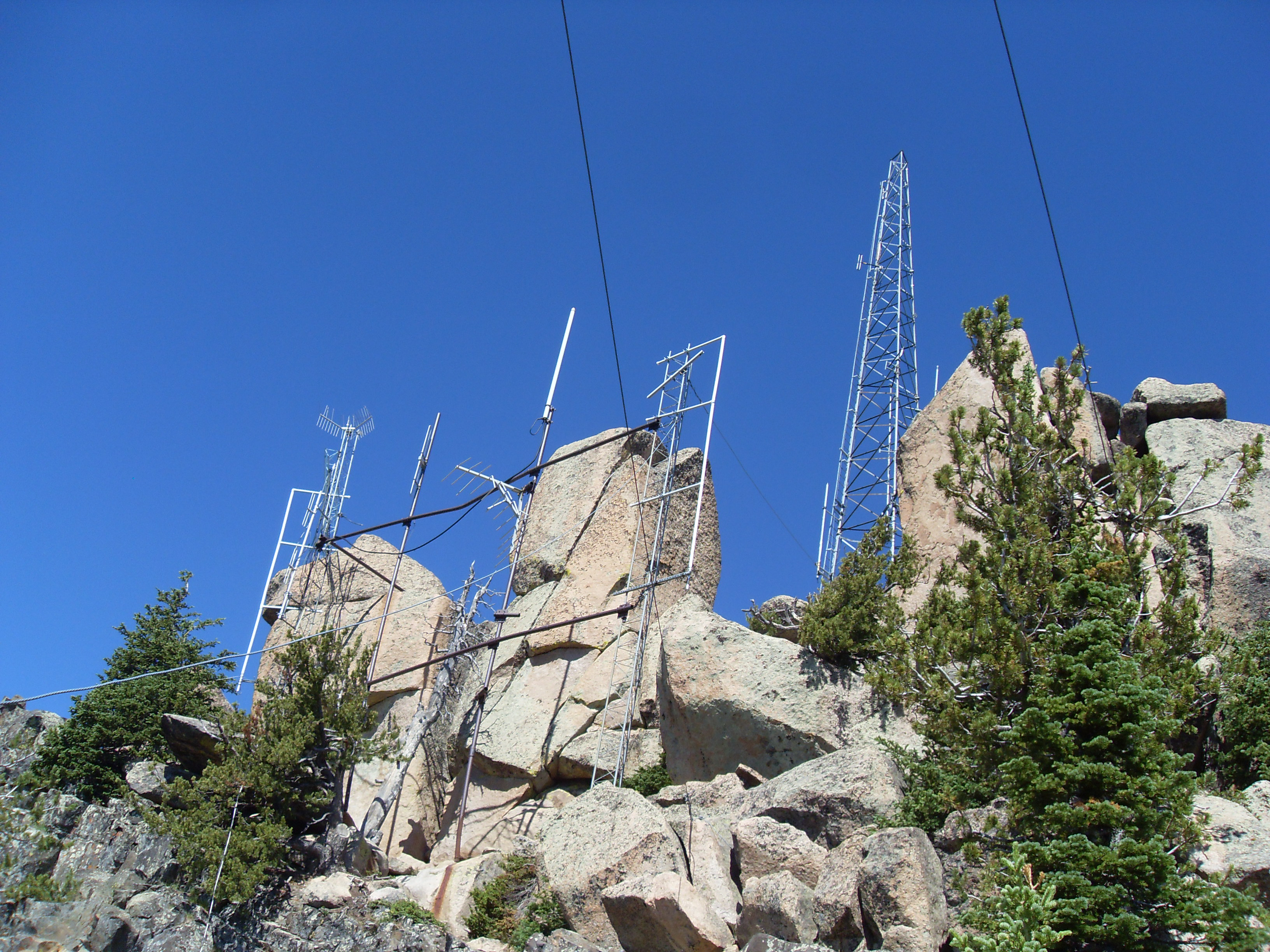
Antennas on top of Laramie Peak

A trail starting at the Friend Park Campground leads over a distance of about 5 Miles to the top of the hill. It rises from 7200 feet elevation to 10276 feet. On top, several antennas, containers for transmitters and a helicopter platform are installed.

== See also ==
- List of mountain peaks of North America
  - List of mountain peaks of the United States
