= White River Plateau =

Plateau in Colorado, US

Coordinates: 39°47′30″N 107°21′50″W

The White River Plateau is a "broad structural dome" located north of Glenwood Springs, Colorado, and north of the Colorado River in the United States. Also called the White River Uplift, the mountainous area is shown on maps as being roughly circular in area, occupying parts of the Colorado counties of Garfield and Rio Blanco, with small portions extending into Eagle and Routt counties. The Grand Hogback marks parts of the plateau's southern and western boundaries. The Flat Tops mountain range is part of the White River Plateau, and much of the plateau is located within the White River National Forest.

The summit of Blair Mountain, elevation 11,465 feet (3,495 meters), is the plateau's highest point.

== Geology ==
The plateau forms part of the Southern Rocky Mountains. It was created during the Eocene, during the latter part of the Laramide orogeny.
