= Crater Peak (Colorado) =

Mountain in the state of Colorado

- Location within Colorado

Highest point
- Elevation: 11,333 ft (3,454 m)
- Prominence: 2,307 ft (703 m)
- Isolation: 17.98 mi (28.94 km)
- Listing: Colorado prominent summits Colorado range high points
- Coordinates: 39°02′23″N 107°39′46″W

Geography
- Location: Delta County, Colorado, U.S.
- Parent range: Highest summit of Grand Mesa
- Topo map(s): USGS 7.5' topographic map Chalk Mountain, Colorado

Climbing
- Easiest route: hike

Crater Peak is the highest summit of Grand Mesa in the Rocky Mountains of North America. The prominent 11,333-foot (3,454 m) peak is located on the drainage divide separating Grand Mesa National Forest and Gunnison National Forest, 12.3 miles (19.8 km) north-northwest (bearing 342°) of the Town of Paonia in Delta County, Colorado, United States.

== Climate ==
Climate data for Crater Peak 39.0480 N, 107.6844 W, Elevation: 10,971 ft (3,344 m) (1991–2020 normals)
Month	Jan	Feb	Mar	Apr	May	Jun	Jul	Aug	Sep	Oct	Nov	Dec	Year
Mean daily maximum °F (°C)	25.8 (−3.4)	27.6 (−2.4)	34.9 (1.6)	40.0 (4.4)	48.9 (9.4)	60.2 (15.7)	66.2 (19.0)	64.0 (17.8)	57.0 (13.9)	45.8 (7.7)	33.8 (1.0)	25.6 (−3.6)	44.2 (6.8)
Daily mean °F (°C)	13.9 (−10.1)	15.2 (−9.3)	21.6 (−5.8)	27.2 (−2.7)	36.2 (2.3)	46.2 (7.9)	52.7 (11.5)	50.8 (10.4)	44.0 (6.7)	33.5 (0.8)	22.1 (−5.5)	14.1 (−9.9)	31.5 (−0.3)
Mean daily minimum °F (°C)	2.0 (−16.7)	2.8 (−16.2)	8.3 (−13.2)	14.5 (−9.7)	23.5 (−4.7)	32.3 (0.2)	39.2 (4.0)	37.5 (3.1)	31.0 (−0.6)	21.3 (−5.9)	10.4 (−12.0)	2.7 (−16.3)	18.8 (−7.3)
Average precipitation inches (mm)	4.34 (110)	4.63 (118)	4.33 (110)	4.11 (104)	3.07 (78)	1.40 (36)	2.85 (72)	2.86 (73)	3.47 (88)	3.92 (100)	3.88 (99)	4.54 (115)	43.4 (1,103)
Source: PRISM Climate Group

== See also ==
- List of Colorado mountain ranges
- List of Colorado mountain summits
  - List of Colorado fourteeners
  - List of Colorado 4000 meter prominent summits
  - List of the most prominent summits of Colorado
- List of Colorado county high points
