= Purple Peak (Colorado) =

Mountain in Colorado, United States

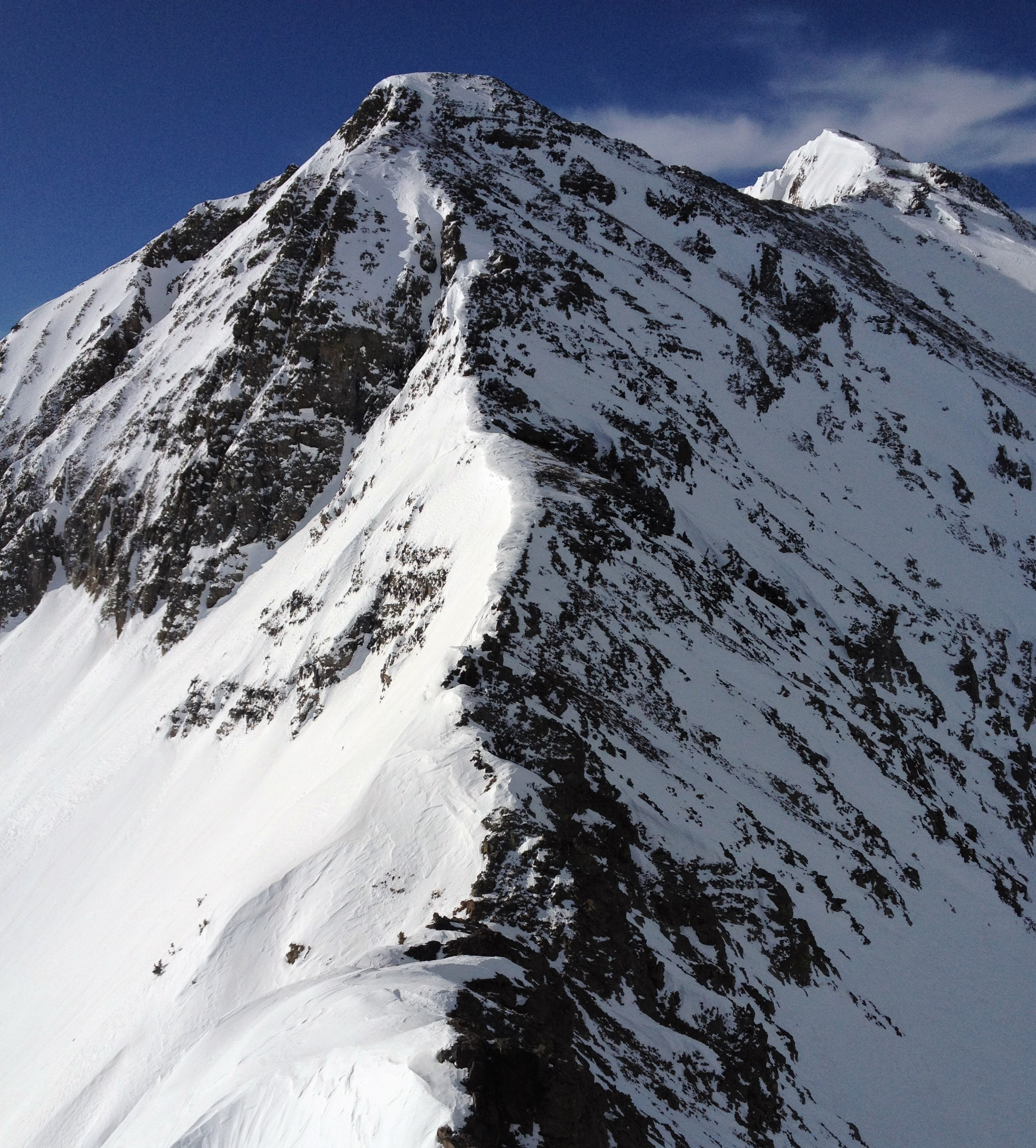
- North aspect in winter

Highest point
- Elevation: 12,800 ft (3,901 m)
- Prominence: 160 ft (49 m)
- Parent peak: Mount Owen (13,070 ft)
- Isolation: 0.31 mi (0.50 km)
- Coordinates: 38°54′45″N 107°07′13″W

Geography
- Location within Colorado Location within the United States
- Country: United States
- State: Colorado
- County: Gunnison County
- Protected area: Raggeds Wilderness
- Parent range: Rocky Mountains; Elk Mountains; Ruby Range
- Topo map: USGS Oh-be-joyful

Climbing
- Easiest route: class 2 hiking

Purple Peak is a mountain summit in Gunnison County, Colorado, United States.

== Description ==
Purple Peak, elevation 12,800-feet (3,901 m), is situated in the Elk Mountains which are a subrange of the Rocky Mountains. The peak is located nine miles (14 km) northwest of the community of Crested Butte in the Raggeds Wilderness on land managed by Gunnison National Forest. It is set on the crest of the Ruby Range between Afley Peak to the north and line parent Mount Owen to the southwest. Precipitation runoff from the mountain's northeast slope drains into Oh-be-joyful Creek which is a tributary of the Slate River, and the west and south slopes drain into Silver Creek and Ruby Anthracite Creek, thence North Fork Gunnison River. Topographic relief is significant as the summit rises 1,760 feet (536 m) above Blue Lake in one-half mile (0.80 km). The landform's toponym was officially adopted in 1965 by the United States Board on Geographic Names. This landform should not be confused with Purple Mountain, five miles to the north.

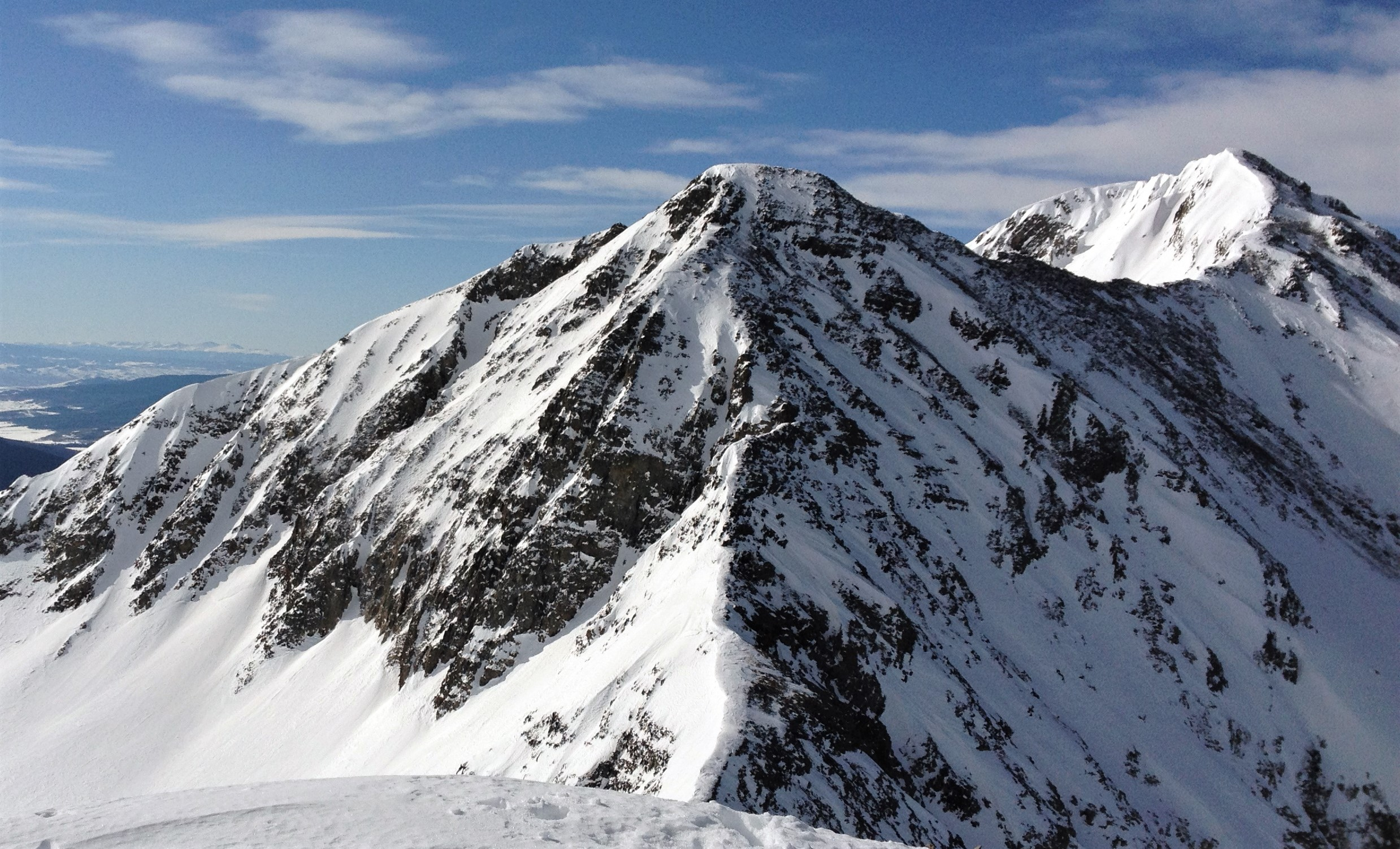
North aspect of Purple Peak viewed from Afley Peak. Top of Mt. Owen in upper right corner.

== Climate ==
According to the Köppen climate classification system, Purple Peak is located in an alpine subarctic climate zone with cold, snowy winters, and cool to warm summers. Due to its altitude, it receives precipitation all year, as snow in winter, and as thunderstorms in summer, with a dry period in late spring.

== See also ==
- List of mountain peaks of Colorado
