= Afley Peak =

Mountain in Colorado, United States

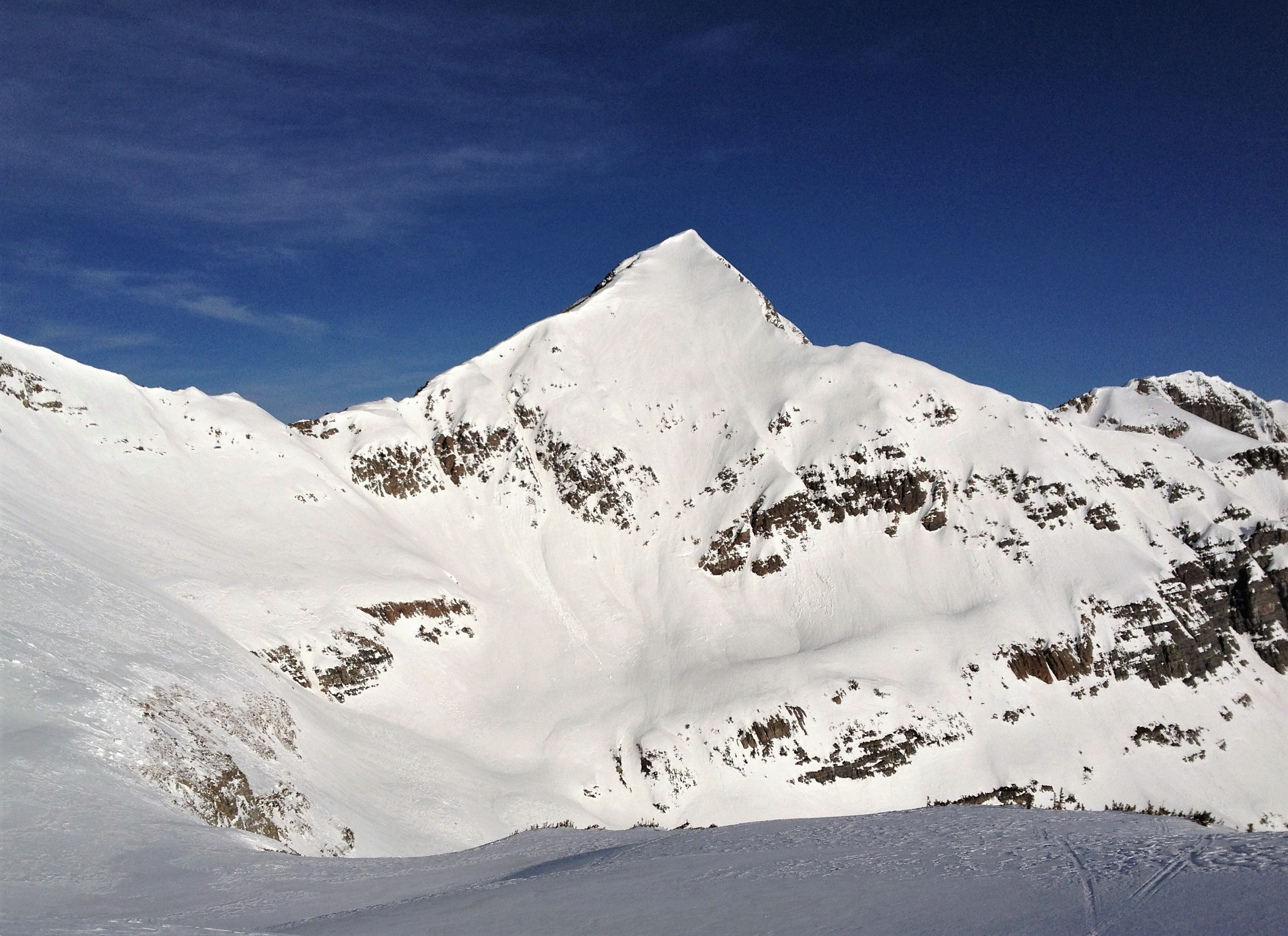
- South-southeast aspect in winter

Highest point
- Elevation: 12,646 ft (3,855 m)
- Prominence: 606 ft (185 m)
- Parent peak: Mount Owen (13,070 ft)
- Isolation: 0.6 mi (0.97 km)
- Coordinates: 38°55′16″N 107°07′08″W

Geography
- Location within Colorado Location within the United States
- Country: United States
- State: Colorado
- County: Gunnison County
- Protected area: Raggeds Wilderness
- Parent range: Rocky Mountains; Elk Mountains; Ruby Range
- Topo map: USGS Oh-be-joyful

Climbing
- Easiest route: class 2 hiking

Afley Peak is a mountain summit in Gunnison County, Colorado, United States.

== Description ==
Afley Peak, elevation 12,646-feet (3,855 m), is situated on the crest of the Ruby Range of the Elk Mountains which are a subrange of the Rocky Mountains. The peak is located nine miles (14 km) northwest of the community of Crested Butte in the Raggeds Wilderness on land managed by Gunnison National Forest. Precipitation runoff from the mountain's east slope drains into headwaters of Oh-be-joyful Creek which is a tributary of the Slate River, and the west slope drains into headwaters of Silver Creek → Anthracite Creek → North Fork Gunnison River. Topographic relief is significant as the summit rises 1,600 feet (488 m) above Blue Lake in one-half mile (0.80 km) and 3,000 feet (914 m) above Silver Creek in two miles (3.2 km). The landform's toponym has been officially adopted by the United States Board on Geographic Names, and has been recorded in publications since at least 1893.

== Climate ==
According to the Köppen climate classification system, Afley Peak is located in an alpine subarctic climate zone with cold, snowy winters, and cool to warm summers. Due to its altitude, it receives precipitation all year, as snow in winter, and as thunderstorms in summer, with a dry period in late spring.

== See also ==
- Purple Peak
- List of mountain peaks of Colorado
