= Purple Mountain (Colorado) =

Mountain in Colorado, United States

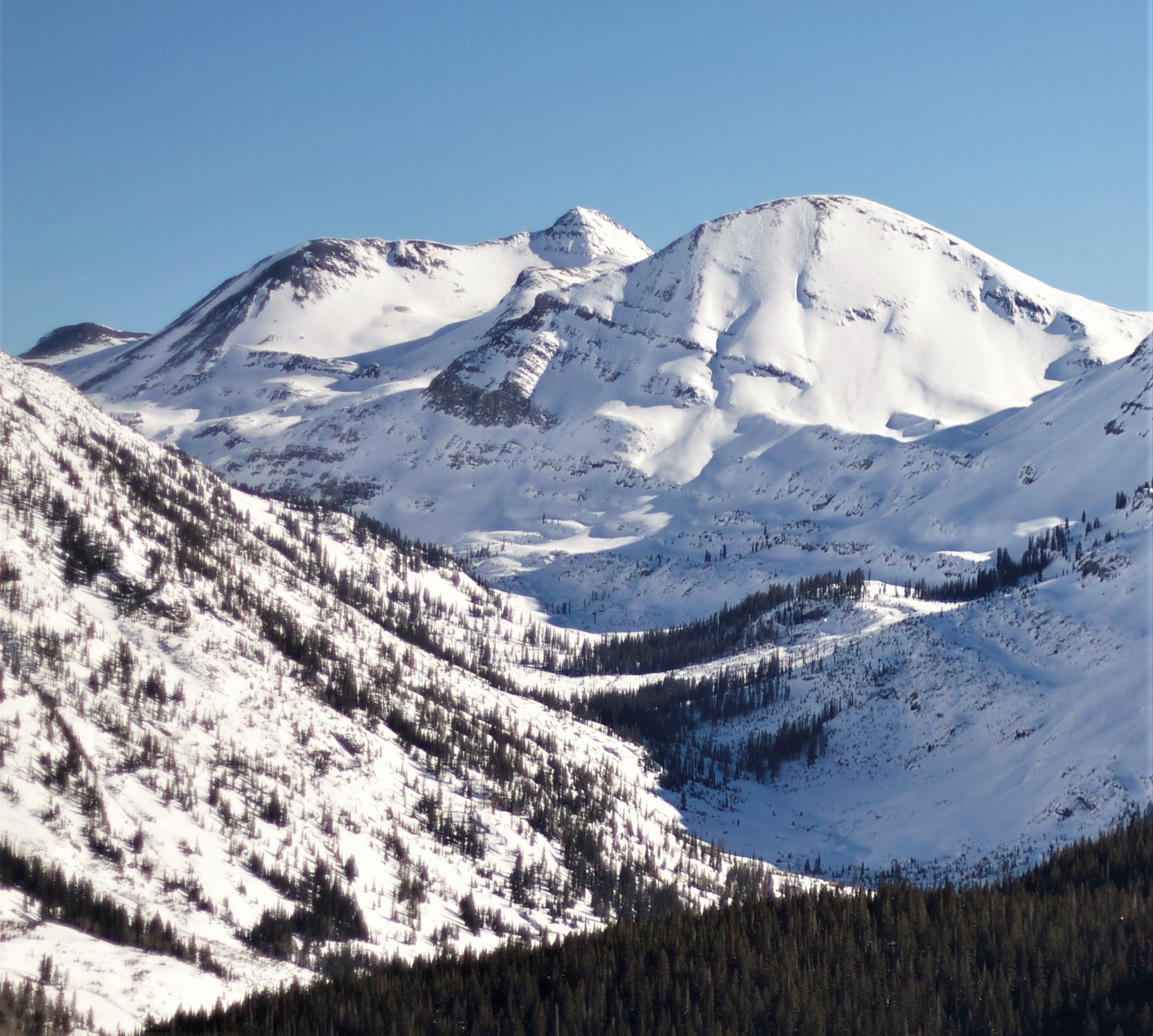
- Northwest aspect, centered (Peak 12781 to the right)

Highest point
- Elevation: 12,958 ft (3,950 m)
- Prominence: 1,172 ft (357 m)
- Parent peak: Mount Owen (13,070 ft)
- Isolation: 1.58 mi (2.54 km)
- Coordinates: 38°59′30″N 107°06′12″W

Geography
- Location within Colorado Location within the United States
- Country: United States
- State: Colorado
- County: Gunnison County
- Protected area: Raggeds Wilderness
- Parent range: Rocky Mountains; Elk Mountains; Ruby Range
- Topo map: USGS Oh-be-joyful

Climbing
- Easiest route: class 2 hiking via Yule Pass

Purple Mountain is a summit in Gunnison County, Colorado, United States.

== Description ==
Purple Mountain, elevation 12,958 feet (3,950 m), is situated in the Elk Mountains which are a subrange of the Rocky Mountains. The peak is located 11 miles (18 km) northwest of the community of Crested Butte in the Raggeds Wilderness, on land managed by Gunnison National Forest and White River National Forest. Precipitation runoff from the mountain's east slope drains into headwaters of the Slate River; the southwest slope drains into Middle Anthracite Creek, thence North Fork Gunnison River; and the northwest slope drains into headwaters of Yule Creek which is a tributary of the Crystal River. Topographic relief is significant as the summit rises 2,960 feet (902 m) above Middle Anthracite Creek in 1.2 mile (1.93 km). The landform's toponym was officially adopted on April 4, 1906, by the United States Board on Geographic Names. This landform should not be confused with Purple Peak, five miles to the south.

== Climate ==
According to the Köppen climate classification system, Purple Mountain is located in an alpine subarctic climate zone with cold, snowy winters, and cool to warm summers. Due to its altitude, it receives precipitation all year, as snow in winter, and as thunderstorms in summer, with a dry period in late spring.

== See also ==
- List of mountain peaks of Colorado
