= Crystal Peak (Gunnison County, Colorado) =

Mountain in Gunnison County, Colorado, United States

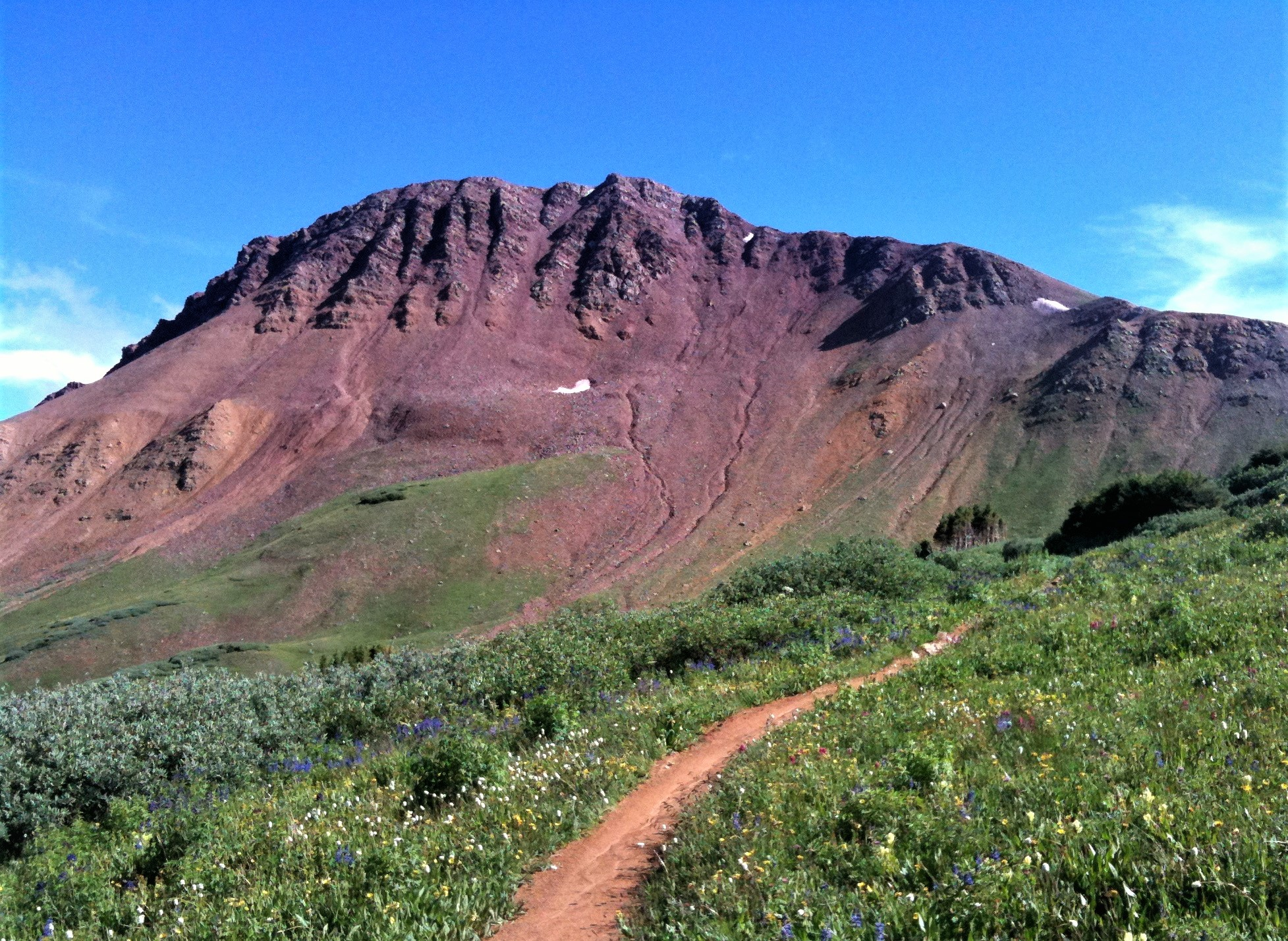
- North aspect

Highest point
- Elevation: 12,777 ft (3,894 m)
- Prominence: 447 ft (136 m)
- Parent peak: Star Peak (13,527 ft)
- Isolation: 1.12 mi (1.80 km)
- Coordinates: 38°57′52″N 106°47′30″W

Geography
- Location within Colorado Location within the United States
- Country: United States
- State: Colorado
- County: Gunnison
- Parent range: Rocky Mountains; Elk Mountains
- Topo map: USGS Pearl Pass

Climbing
- Easiest route: class 1+ hiking

Crystal Peak is a 12,777-foot (3,894 m) mountain summit in Gunnison County, Colorado, United States.

== Description ==
Crystal Peak is situated 10.5 miles (16.9 km) west of the Continental Divide in the Elk Mountains which are a subrange of the Rocky Mountains. The mountain is located 30 miles (48 km) north of the community of Gunnison in the Gunnison National Forest. Precipitation runoff from the mountain's north slope drains into the headwaters of the Taylor River, whereas the other slopes drain into tributaries of the East River. Topographic relief is modest as the summit rises 1,777 feet (542 m) above Taylor River in 1.5 miles (2.4 km). The mountain's toponym has been officially adopted by the United States Board on Geographic Names. This peak should not be confused with another Crystal Peak (12,632 ft) in Gunnison County, 16.5 miles (26.6 km) to the west-northwest.

== Climate ==
According to the Köppen climate classification system, Crystal Peak is located in an alpine subarctic climate zone with cold, snowy winters, and cool to warm summers. Due to its altitude, it receives precipitation all year, as snow in winter and as thunderstorms in summer, with a dry period in late spring.

== See also ==
- List of mountain peaks of Colorado
