= Pearl Mountain =

Mountain in the state of Colorado

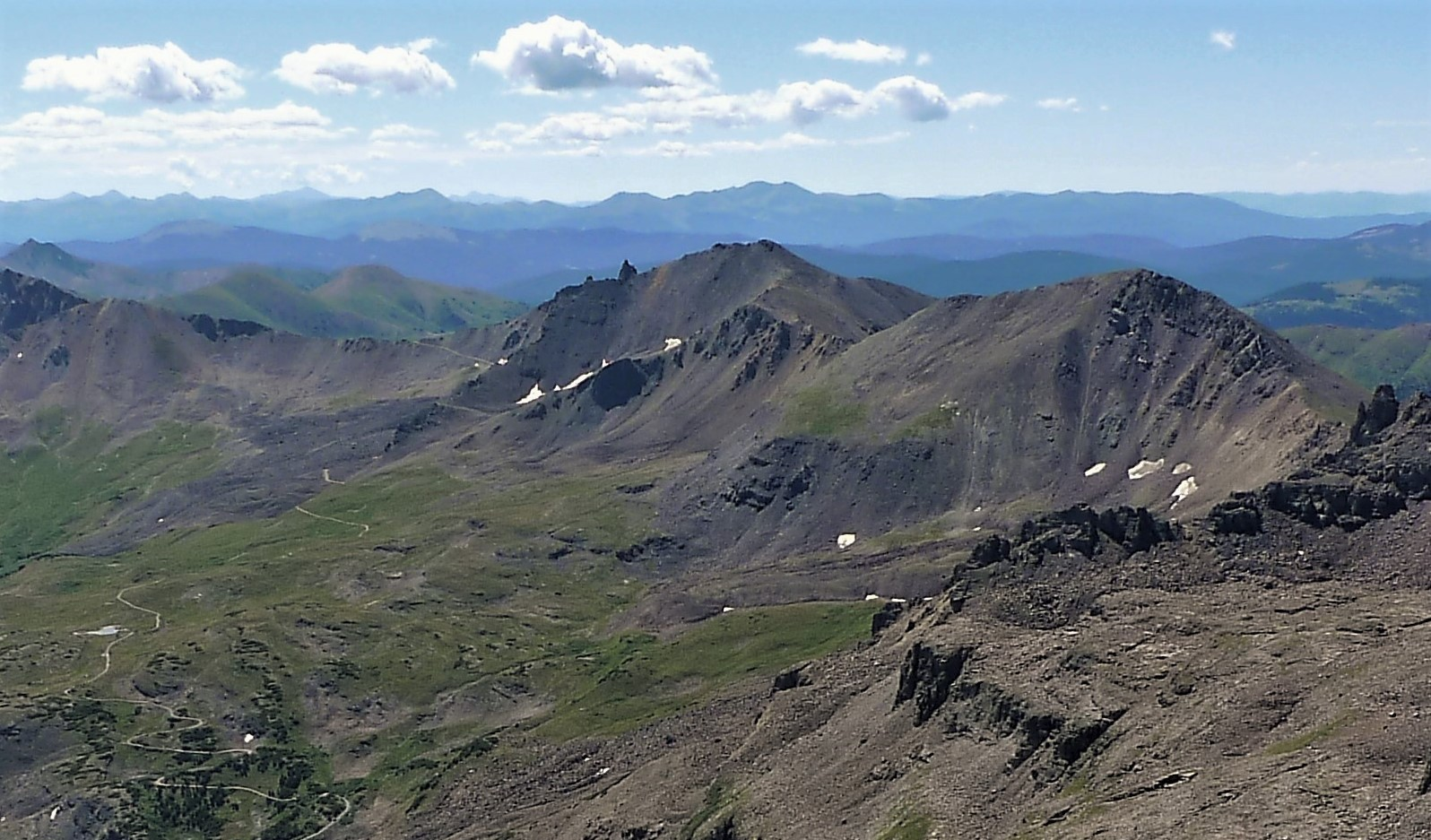
- Northwest aspect, centered

Highest point
- Elevation: 13,379 ft (4,078 m)
- Prominence: 604 ft (184 m)
- Parent peak: Castle Peak (14,279 ft)
- Isolation: 1.86 mi (2.99 km)
- Coordinates: 38°58′51″N 106°50′03″W

Geography
- Location within Colorado Location within the United States
- Country: United States
- State: Colorado
- County: Gunnison County / Pitkin County
- Protected area: Maroon Bells–Snowmass Wilderness
- Parent range: Rocky Mountains; Elk Mountains
- Topo map: USGS Pearl Pass

Climbing
- Easiest route: class 2 hiking

Pearl Mountain is a 13,379-foot (4,078 m) summit on the shared border between Gunnison County and Pitkin County in Colorado, United States.

== Description ==
Pearl Mountain is situated 14 miles (23 km) west of the Continental Divide in the Elk Mountains which are a subrange of the Rocky Mountains. The mountain is located 15 miles (24 km) south of the community of Aspen and set in the Maroon Bells–Snowmass Wilderness, on land managed by White River National Forest and Gunnison National Forest. It ranks as the 26th-highest peak in Gunnison County and 339th-highest in Colorado. Pearl Mountain is one-half mile immediately west of Pearl Pass and 1.85 miles (2.98 km) west of Star Peak which is the nearest higher neighbor. Precipitation runoff from the mountain's north slope drains to the Roaring Fork River via Cooper Creek and Castle Creek, whereas the south slope drains into Middle Brush Creek which is a tributary of the East River. Topographic relief is significant as the summit rises 2,500 feet (762 m) above Middle Brush Creek in one mile (1.6 km). The mountain's toponym has been officially adopted by the United States Board on Geographic Names, and has been recorded in publications since at least 1884.

== Climate ==
According to the Köppen climate classification system, Pearl Mountain is located in an alpine subarctic climate zone with cold, snowy winters, and cool to warm summers. Due to its altitude, it receives precipitation all year, as snow in winter, and as thunderstorms in summer, with a dry period in late spring. Climbers can expect afternoon rain, hail, and lightning from the seasonal monsoon in late July and August.

== See also ==
- List of mountain peaks of Colorado
- Thirteener
