= Cottonwood Pass =

Mountain pass in Colorado, USA

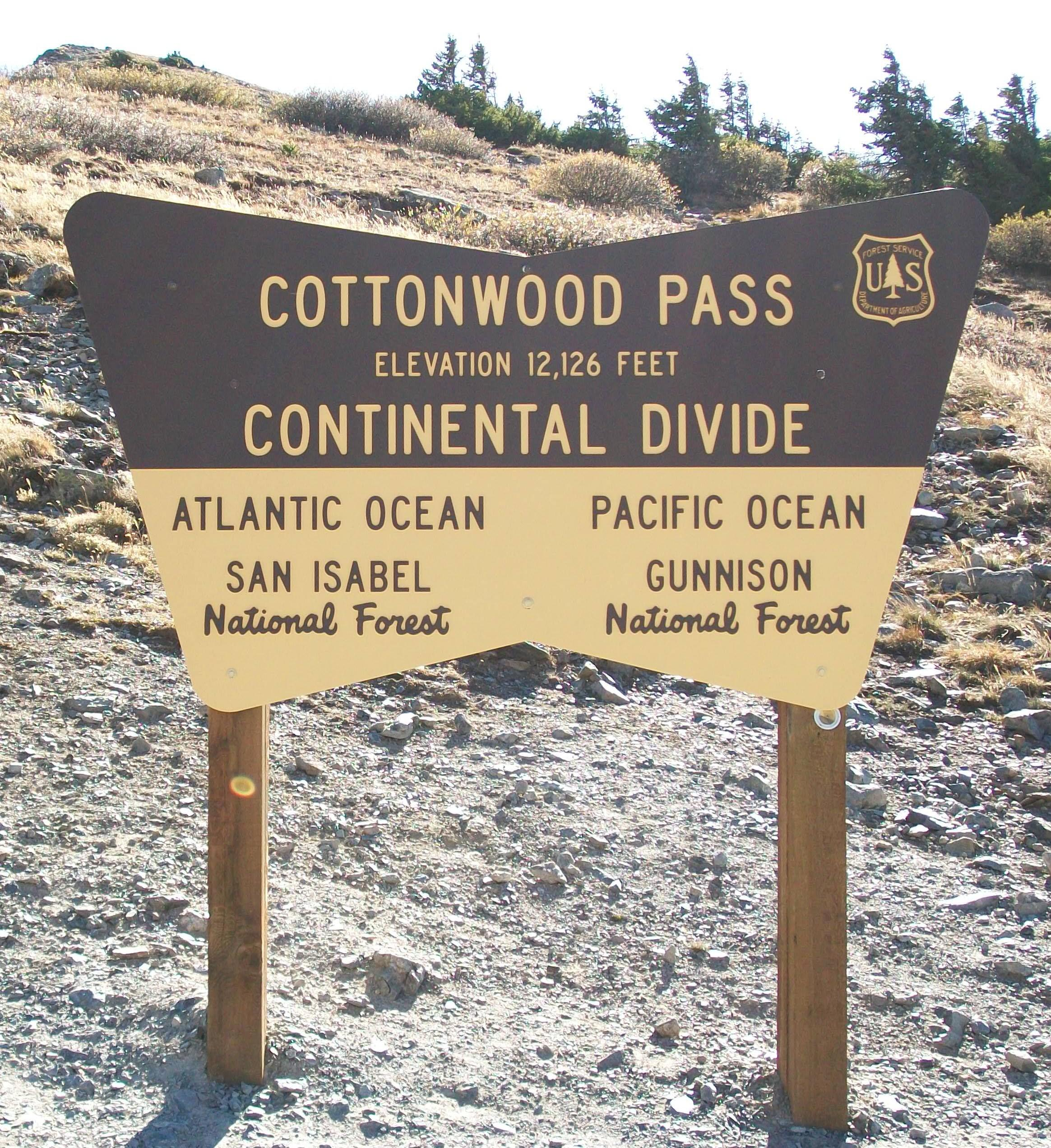
- Sign marking the Continental Divide atop Cottonwood Pass.
- Interactive map of Cottonwood Pass
- Elevation: 12,119 feet (3,694 m)
- Traversed by: Chaffee County Road 306; Gunnison County Road 209

Third Approach
- Location: Chaffee–Gunnison counties, Colorado, U.S.
- Range: Saguache Range
- Coordinates: 38°49′40.31″N 106°24′33.37″W
- Topo map: Tincup

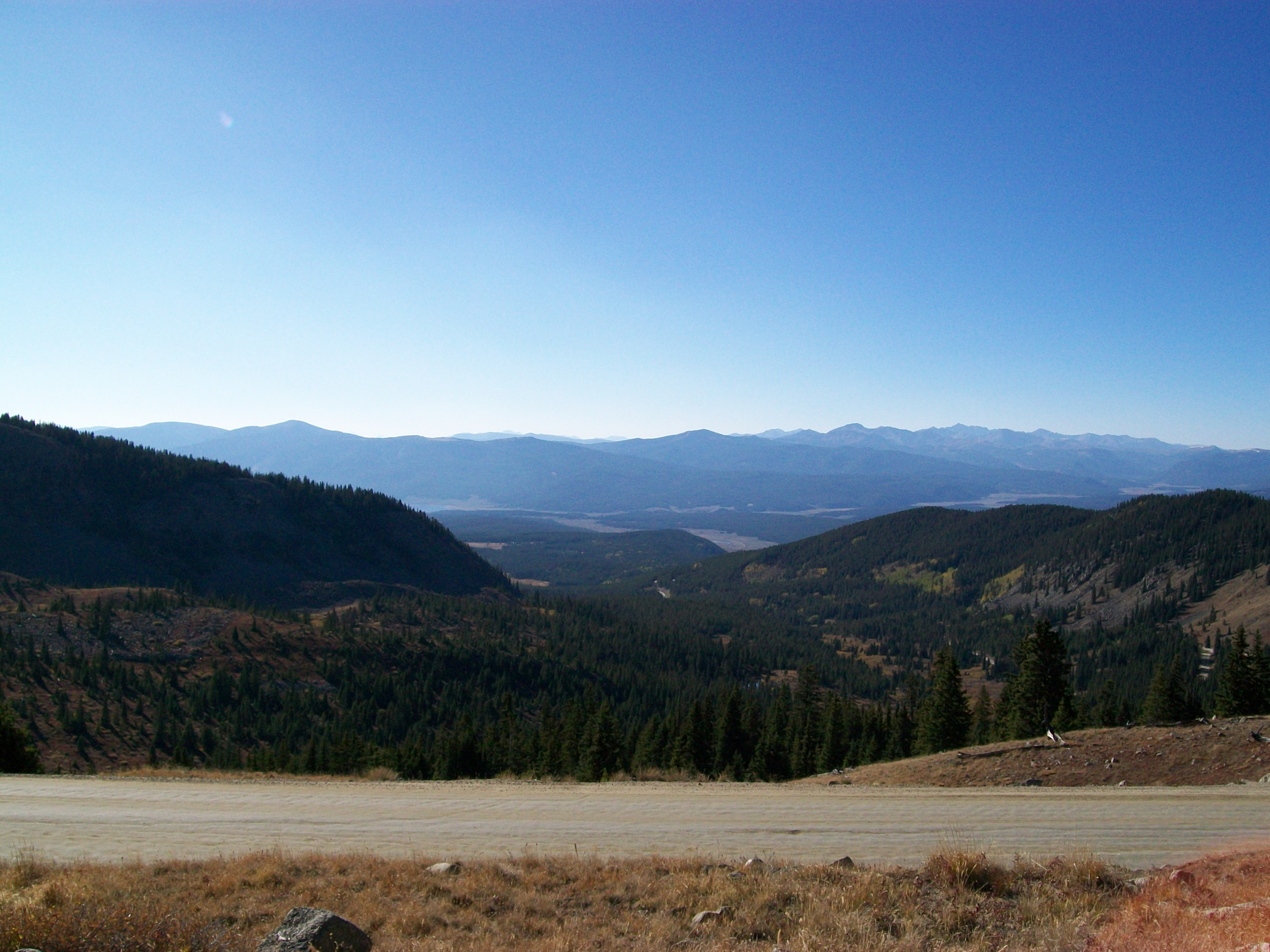
View from near Cottonwood Pass, facing northwest.

Cottonwood Pass (elevation 12,119 feet (3,694 m)) is a high mountain pass on the Continental Divide in south-central Colorado in the Rocky Mountains of the western United States. It is located along the border of Gunnison and Chaffee counties in Colorado, and is in the Sawatch Range. The road over Cottonwood Pass is the highest paved crossing of the Continental Divide in the U.S., and the second highest pass with an improved road in the state (the highest is Trail Ridge Road, US HWY 34 at 12,183 ft). It is the fourth-highest paved road in the state after Mount Blue Sky Scenic Byway, Pikes Peak Highway, and Trail Ridge Road.

The pass is closed seasonally due to heavy snowfall, typically from around October until sometime in May. When open, the pass can be accessed from Buena Vista to the east by following Chaffee County Road 306. Near the summit, the road name changes to Gunnison County Road 209 as it continues to the west, passing near Taylor Park Reservoir and continuing down into the town of Almont. The road is fully paved on both sides. When open, the pass is one of the few routes through the Sawatch Range accessible in a standard two-wheel drive passenger vehicle. Independence Pass is another such seasonal route through this mountain range, while efforts are made to ensure that U.S. 50 at Monarch Pass remains open year-round for all vehicles, barring extreme weather conditions.

The area surrounding the pass is mostly forest, with the San Isabel National Forest to the east and the Gunnison National Forest to the west.

== Mudslides ==
In July 2002, heavy rains from a thunderstorm east of Cottonwood Pass caused a significant mudslide that blocked portions of Chaffee County Road 306 for many days. The National Weather Service estimated that between three and four inches of rain fell within one hour on the evening of 22 July 2002, causing a portion known as Red Deer Mountain to begin sliding downward and leaving debris up to 15 feet deep on the road. Several people were rescued from their vehicles after becoming trapped by the mud, but no fatalities were reported. Other mudslides caused by slow-moving thunderstorms have occurred near this area in both 2004 and 2007.

== 2017-2019 project to pave and improve the pass road ==
A project to widen, realign, and pave the pass began in the spring of 2017 and was completed in September 2019. The three-year-long project made the pass the country's second-highest paved pass.
