= Purple Mountain =

Purple Mountain may refer to:

== China ==
- Purple Mountain (Nanjing), a mountain in Nanjing, Jiangsu

== Ireland ==
- Purple Mountain (Kerry), a mountain in County Kerry

== United States ==
- Purple Mountain (Alaska), a mountain in Alaska
- Purple Mountain (Colorado), a mountain in Colorado
- Purple Peak (Colorado), a mountain in Colorado
- Purple Mountain (Oregon), a mountain in Oregon
- Purple Mountain (Washington), a mountain in Washington
- Purple Mountain (Wyoming), a mountain in Yellowstone National Park, Wyoming

== See also ==
- Purple Mountains, an American indie rock band
