= Purple (disambiguation) =

Purple is a colour.

Purple may also refer to:

== Music ==
- Purple Records, a record label
- Purple (Baroness album), 2015
- Purple (Leslie Clio album), 2017
- Purple (Shizuka Kudo album), 1995
- Purple (Stone Temple Pilots album), 1994
- Purple (EP), by Mamamoo, 2017
- "Purple" (Pop Evil song), 2012
- "Purple" (Skin song), 2006
- "Purple", a song by Hyuna from Following, 2017
- "Purple", a song by Nas from The Lost Tapes, 2002
- "Purple", a song by Olivia Rodrigo from You Seem Pretty Sad for a Girl So in Love, 2026
- "Purple", a song by Six60 from Six60, 2015

== Other uses ==
- Purple (cipher machine), American codename of a Japanese cipher machine used before and during World War II
- Purple (government), a political term
- Purple (magazine), a French fashion, art, and culture publication
- Purple.com, a website founded in 1994
- Norman H. Purple (1803–1863), American jurist
- Northwestern Wildcats, formerly "The Purple", the sports teams of Northwestern University, Evanston, Illinois, US
- Peri Urban Regions Platform Europe, a network of European regions
- The Purple One, a chocolate included in the Quality Street confectionary brand

== See also ==
- Born in the purple, born to high title
- Purple Mountain (disambiguation)
- The Color Purple (disambiguation)
- Purpure, a heraldic tincture equivalent to "purple"
- William Afton, a Five Nights at Freddy's character commonly referred to as "Purple Guy"
