= Treasure Mountain (Colorado) =

Mountain in Colorado, United States

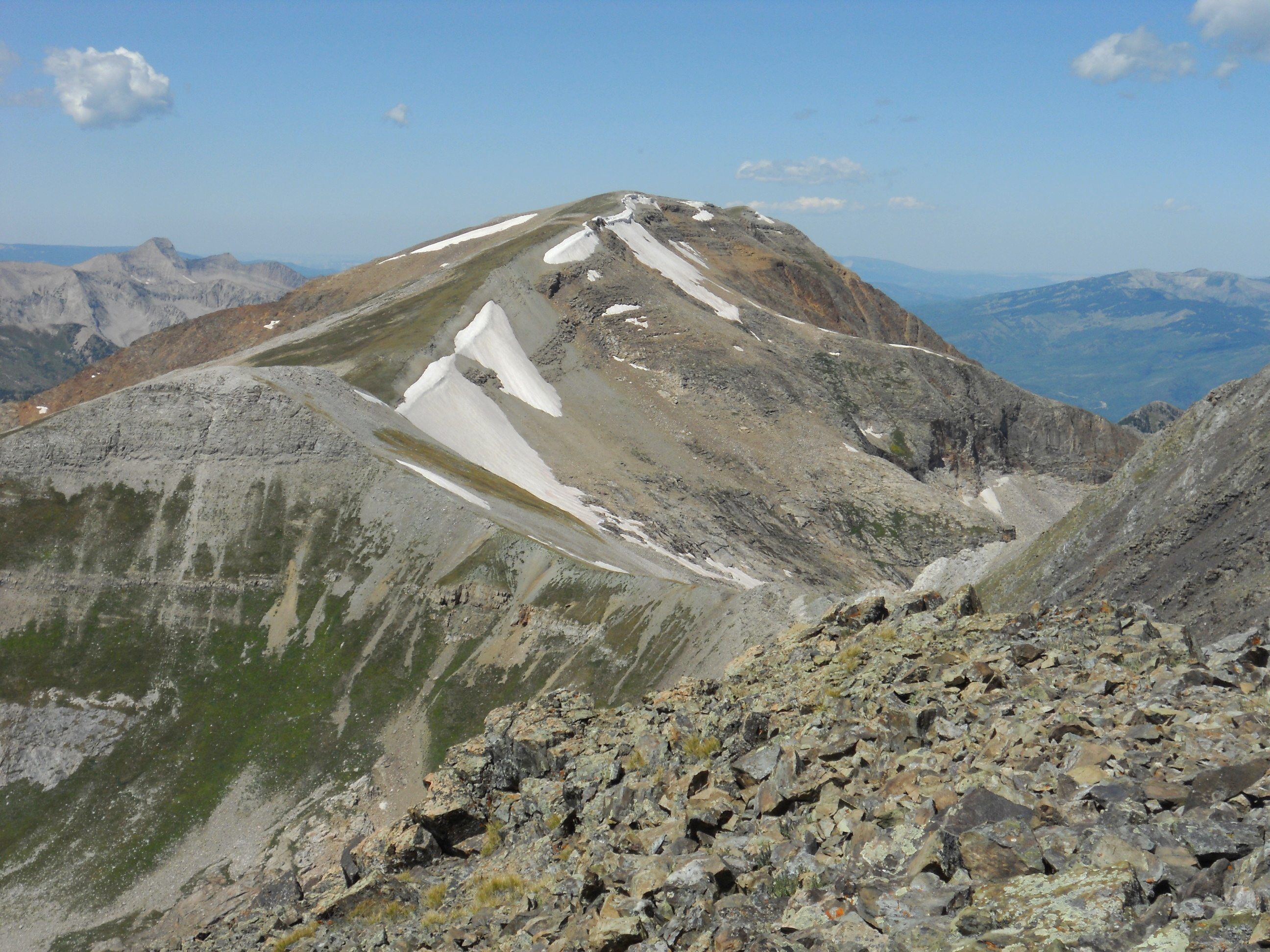
- Treasure Mountain viewed from the southeast.

Highest point
- Elevation: 13,535 ft (4,125 m)
- Prominence: 2,828 ft (862 m)
- Parent peak: Hagerman Peak
- Isolation: 6.92 mi (11.14 km)
- Listing: North America highest peaks 92nd; US highest major peaks 75th; Colorado highest major peaks 39th
- Coordinates: 39°01′28″N 107°07′22″W

Geography
- Location within Colorado
- Location: Gunnison County, Colorado, U.S.
- Parent range: Elk Mountains
- Topo map(s): USGS 7.5' topographic map Snowmass Mountain, Colorado

Treasure Mountain, elevation 13,535 ft (4,125 m), is a summit in the Elk Mountains of western Colorado. The mountain is in the Raggeds Wilderness southeast of Marble. The massif has been the site of marble mining and a legend of lost French gold.

== Immediate vicinity ==
Treasure Mountain forms a single massif with Treasury Mountain, elevation 13,462 feet (4,103 m), that rises on the southeast. Another Treasure Mountain, el. 11,834 feet (3,607 m) is located in Mineral County, Colorado.

Other peaks in the vicinity include Whitehouse Mountain, elevation 11,975 feet (3,650 m); Bear Mountain, elevation 12,373 feet (3,771 m); Crystal Peak, elevation 12,632 feet (3,850 m); Purple Mountain, elevation 12,856 feet (3,919 m); and Cinnamon Mountain, 12,293 feet (3,747 m). The Ruby Range extends southward from Treasury Mountain forming the east boundary of the Raggeds Wilderness.

The Yule Lakes are a series of lakes situated on the southern slopes which drain into Yule Creek and feeds Beaver Lake east of Marble. The watershed is part of Crystal River basin which drains the northern slopes of Treasure Mountain and is the northeastern boundary of Raggeds Wilderness. Yule Pass, south of Treasury Mountain separates the Raggeds Wilderness of the Sopris Ranger District from the Gunnison Ranger District and leads to the southeast along the Slate River drainage. Yule Pass is to the east of the headwaters of Yule Creek.

== Geology ==
The Colorado Yule Marble (a.k.a. Yule Colorado marble) comes from the Leadville Limestone of Mississippian age quarried near the mountain. It was formed by contact metamorphism in the Tertiary period following the intrusion and uplift of nearby granitic Treasure Mountain dome.

Yule marble was used in the building of the Lincoln Memorial. The Yule marble quarry is at an elevation of 9,300 ft (2,800 m) on the west side of Treasure Mountain along Yule Creek. The quality and durability of the Yule marble was questioned prior to the building of the Lincoln Memorial as was the recently opened quarry's ability to provide the quantity and size required for construction.

== Origin of name ==
The original name of the peak was Citadel Mountain. The current name came from an ill-fated French mining expedition described in folklore documented in the 1930s and 1940s.

The folklore states that the expedition was organized in the late 1700s by Napoleon Bonaparte, who needed financing to fund his ambitions. The expedition was reported to have consisted of 300 men and 450 horses. They left New Orleans and traveled through Leavenworth, Kansas en route to the Rocky Mountains. The folklore claims that a large amount of gold was discovered and amassed by the expedition near Wolf Creek Pass. The local Native Americans were reportedly initially friendly, but relations deteriorated. In the folklore, the French buried the gold and escaped from the area, pursued and hunted by warriors. One survivor, by the name of Le Blanc, made it back to Kansas. He was the expedition's historian and was reported to have made two maps of the hidden treasure.

A later expedition failed to find the treasure. William Yule, many years later, claimed to possess a copy of the original map and explored the area south and west of the mountain. The mountain was named after the legend of the missing treasure.

== See also ==
- List of mountain peaks of North America
  - List of mountain peaks of the United States
    - List of mountain peaks of Colorado
