= Purple Land =

Purple Land, purplelands, Land of Purple, may refer to:

== Arts, entertainment, media ==
- The Purple Land, a 1885 novel by William Henry Hudson set in Uruguay
- "The Purple Land", a poem by Donald Wandrei featured in the 1997 collection Don't Dream
- Purple Lands, a 2020 exhibition by Rex Southwick at Unit London, London, England, UK
- "Purple Land", a 2024 song by Amen Dunes off the album Death Jokes

== Places ==
- Purple Land, a nickname for Uruguay; see History of Uruguay
- Purple land (Portuguese: terra roxa), fertile lands in the region of Jaú, São Paulo, Brazil
- Purple land, fertile lands on the Southern Plateau, Brazilian Highlands, Brazil
- Canaan (2nd millennium BCE), the "Land of Purple" in the Levant
- Phoenicia (1st millennium BCE), the "Land of Purple" in the Levant; see Tyrian purple

== Other uses ==
- Purpleland (NATO country code XXP, XP), a fictitious country used in military exercises; see List of NATO country codes

== See also ==
- Purple (disambiguation)
- Land (disambiguation)
