= Star Peak =

Star Peak can refer to:

- Star Peak (Colorado)
- Star Peak (Nevada), the highest and most topographically prominent mountain in the Humboldt Range and Pershing County, Nevada.
- Star Peak Group, geologic group in Nevada named for the peak.
- Star Peak (Washington), a summit in the North Cascades
