= Taylor River (Colorado) =

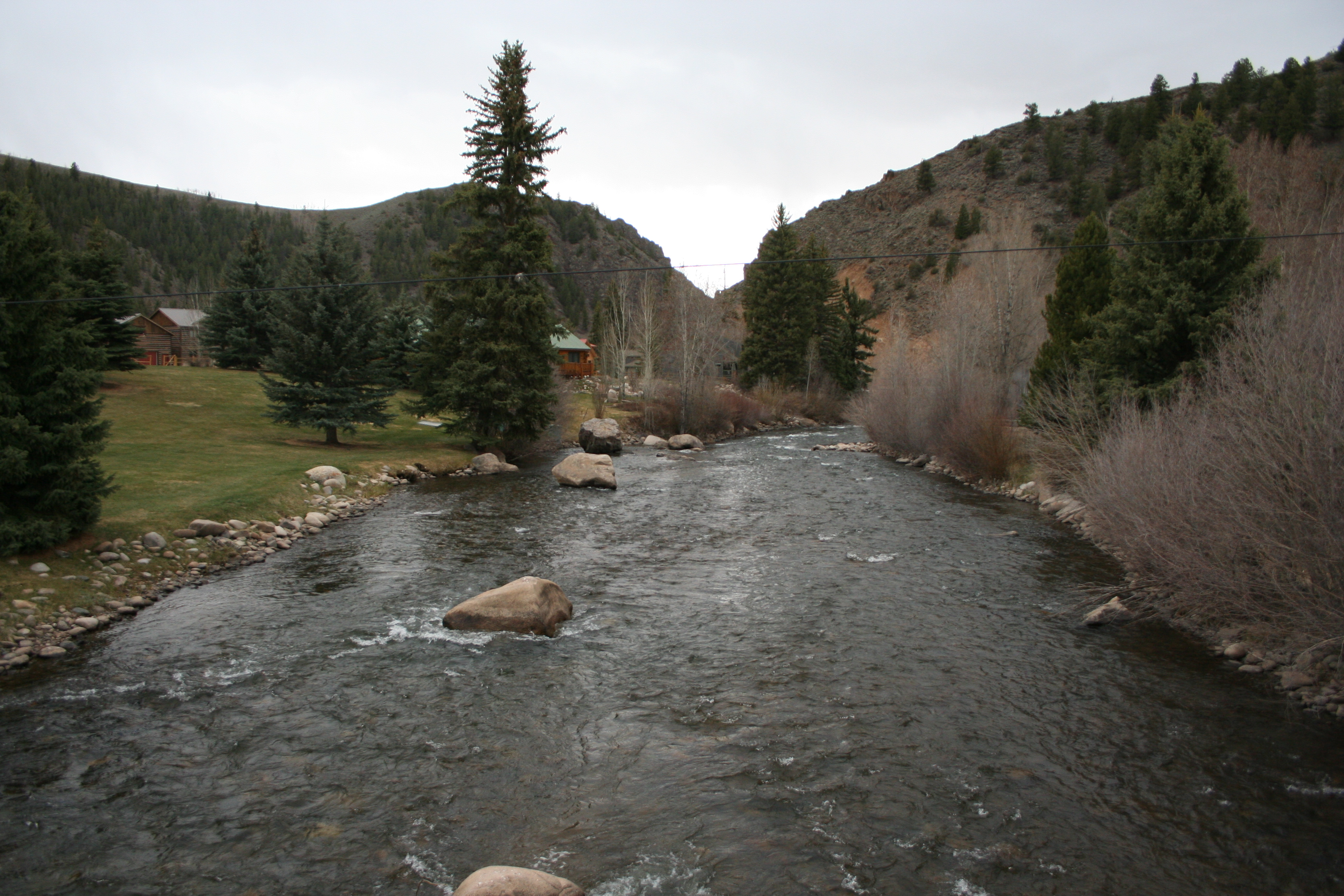
- Taylor River in Almont, Colorado

- Location of mouth in O

Location
- Country: United States
- State: Colorado

Physical characteristics
- Source
  - location: Gunnison County, Colorado
  - coordinates: 38°58′12″N 106°47′27″W
- Mouth
  - location: Confluence with East River
  - coordinates: 38°39′49″N 106°50′50″W
  - elevation: 8,005 ft (2,440 m)

Basin features
- Progression: Gunnison—Colorado

The Taylor River rises between Star Peak and Crystal Peak in Colorado's Elk Mountains in the northeast part of Gunnison County, near the Continental Divide. Flowing southeast, the river goes through Taylor Park Reservoir, created by the Taylor Park Dam. From there it flows southwest. At Almont, the Taylor River joins with the East River to form the Gunnison River. The river is 48.2 miles (77.6 km) long.

Most of the river lies within the Gunnison National Forest. It is a popular river for fly fishing of trout and for whitewater rafting.

== See also ==
- List of rivers of Colorado
- List of tributaries of the Colorado River
