= Taylor Park Dam =

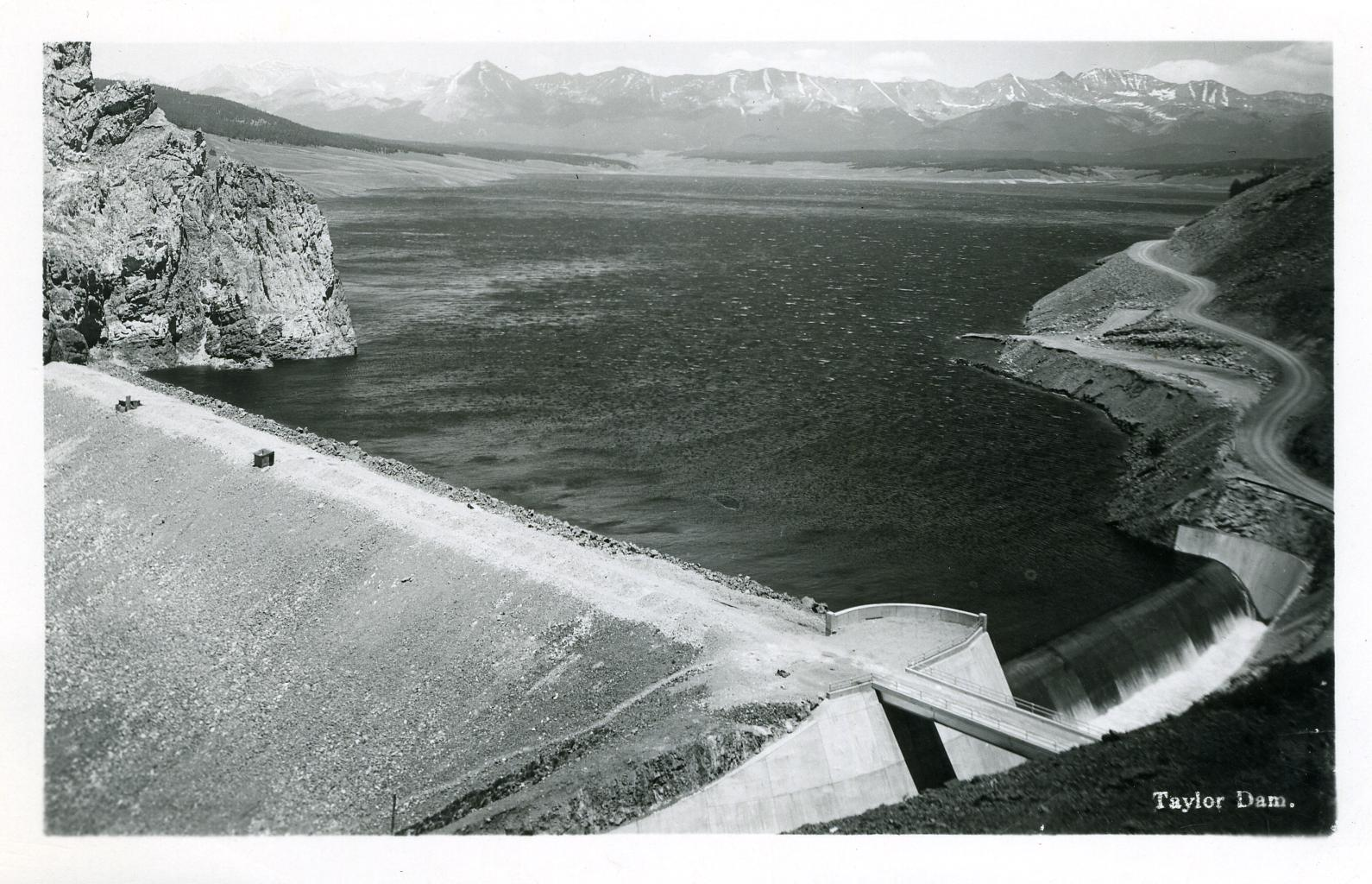

- Location within Colorado Location within the United States
- Country: United States
- Location: Almont, Colorado
- Coordinates: 38°49′07″N 106°36′20″W
- Purpose: Irrigation
- Status: Complete
- Construction began: 1935
- Opening date: 1937
- Built by: Bureau of Reclamation
- Operator: Uncompahgre Valley Water Users Association

Dam and spillways
- Type of dam: Earth fill dam
- Impounds: Taylor River
- Height: 206.8 ft (63.0 m)
- Width (crest): 675 ft (206 m)
- Dam volume: 1,115,000 yd^{3} (852,000 m^{3})
- Spillways: 1
- Spillway type: Weir crest
- Spillway length: 180 ft (55 m)
- Spillway capacity: 10,000 cu ft/s (280 m^{3}/s) at 9,336 ft (2,846 m)
- S pillway volumetric flow rate: 1,500 cu ft/s (42 m^{3}/s) at 9,330 ft (2,840 m)

Reservoir
- Creates: Taylor Park Reservoir
- Total capacity: 106,200 ft/acre (80,000 m/ha)
- Inactive capacity: 9,183 ft/acre (6,916 m/ha)
- Maximum water depth: 160 ft (49 m)
- Normal elevation: 9,336 ft (2,846 m)

Power Station
- Operator: Gunnison County Electric Association
- Commission date: September 20, 2024
- Type: Run-of-the-river
- Turbines: 1
- Installed capacity: .5 MW
- Annual generation: 3.8 million kilowatt-hours
- Website; Taylor Park Dam

Part of the Uncompahgre Project located on the western slope of central Colorado, the Taylor Park Dam was engineered by the Bureau of Reclamation. It is located on the Taylor River, a tributary of the Gunnison River, and the dam is used to create the Taylor Park Reservoir in Gunnison County, Colorado. The dam has National Inventory of Dams ID number CO00151.

== Hydroelectric retrofitting ==
In September 2024, electric cooperative Gunnison County Electric Association commissioned a 500-kilowatt hydro plant at the dam. Called the Taylor River Hydro Project, the plant's single turbine will operate day and night, all year long, without stopping. The plant is expected to produce 3.8 million kilowatt-hours of electricity each year. In 2025, it is the largest known single-phase power generator operating in North America.

== Climate ==
Climate data for Taylor Dam, Colorado, 1991–2020 normals, extremes 1940–present
Month	Jan	Feb	Mar	Apr	May	Jun	Jul	Aug	Sep	Oct	Nov	Dec	Year
Record high °F (°C)	54 (12)	52 (11)	61 (16)	67 (19)	79 (26)	85 (29)	86 (30)	84 (29)	79 (26)	75 (24)	65 (18)	57 (14)	86 (30)
Mean maximum °F (°C)	39 (4)	44 (7)	51 (11)	59 (15)	69 (21)	78 (26)	79 (26)	77 (25)	73 (23)	64 (18)	52 (11)	41 (5)	80 (27)
Mean daily maximum °F (°C)	27.5 (−2.5)	32.3 (0.2)	39.3 (4.1)	46.5 (8.1)	56.5 (13.6)	68.3 (20.2)	72.0 (22.2)	69.7 (20.9)	63.8 (17.7)	52.7 (11.5)	38.9 (3.8)	27.3 (−2.6)	49.6 (9.8)
Daily mean °F (°C)	8.7 (−12.9)	12.8 (−10.7)	21.0 (−6.1)	31.6 (−0.2)	41.7 (5.4)	51.7 (10.9)	56.9 (13.8)	55.0 (12.8)	48.6 (9.2)	38.6 (3.7)	25.3 (−3.7)	11.3 (−11.5)	33.6 (0.9)
Mean daily minimum °F (°C)	−10.0 (−23.3)	−6.8 (−21.6)	1.6 (−16.9)	16.7 (−8.5)	27.5 (−2.5)	35.0 (1.7)	41.7 (5.4)	40.4 (4.7)	33.4 (0.8)	24.3 (−4.3)	11.9 (−11.2)	−4.7 (−20.4)	17.6 (−8.0)
Mean minimum °F (°C)	−35 (−37)	−33 (−36)	−25 (−32)	−4 (−20)	15 (−9)	28 (−2)	35 (2)	33 (1)	24 (−4)	10 (−12)	−9 (−23)	−31 (−35)	−39 (−39)
Record low °F (°C)	−56 (−49)	−60 (−51)	−42 (−41)	−29 (−34)	−5 (−21)	15 (−9)	20 (−7)	17 (−8)	4 (−16)	−7 (−22)	−30 (−34)	−49 (−45)	−60 (−51)
Average precipitation inches (mm)	1.55 (39)	1.51 (38)	1.36 (35)	1.56 (40)	1.51 (38)	1.00 (25)	2.02 (51)	2.01 (51)	1.65 (42)	1.42 (36)	1.46 (37)	1.55 (39)	18.6 (471)
Average snowfall inches (cm)	31.2 (79)	16.5 (42)	16.8 (43)	10.8 (27)	2.5 (6.4)	0.1 (0.25)	0.0 (0.0)	0.0 (0.0)	0.3 (0.76)	2.9 (7.4)	13.1 (33)	22.0 (56)	116.2 (294.81)
Average extreme snow depth inches (cm)	21 (53)	26 (66)	25 (64)	12 (30)	1 (2.5)	0 (0)	0 (0)	0 (0)	0 (0)	0 (0)	3 (7.6)	11 (28)	28 (71)
Average precipitation days (≥ 0.01 in)	9	8	9	8	7	6	10	10	7	6	8	8	96
Source: NOAA

== Taylor Park Reservoir ==
The Taylor Park Reservoir is a body of water created by the 1937 Taylor Park Dam, which dams the Taylor River of Colorado, United States. The dam and reservoir, located about 35 miles (56 km) northeast of Gunnison, are part of the Uncompahgre Project in Colorado. Recreation management at the reservoir is under the jurisdiction of the U.S. Forest Service and offers camping and fishing. Available fish species in the reservoir include rainbow, brown, and cutthroat trout, mackinaw, kokanee, northern pike, and brook trout in the tributaries. The summit of Cottonwood Pass lies a few miles east of the reservoir and can be accessed via Gunnison County Road 209 during the summer months.

== See also ==
- List of largest reservoirs of Colorado

== Additional Sources ==
- Overview Bureau of Reclamation-Taylor Park Dam
