= Peri-urbanisation =

Type of urban growth

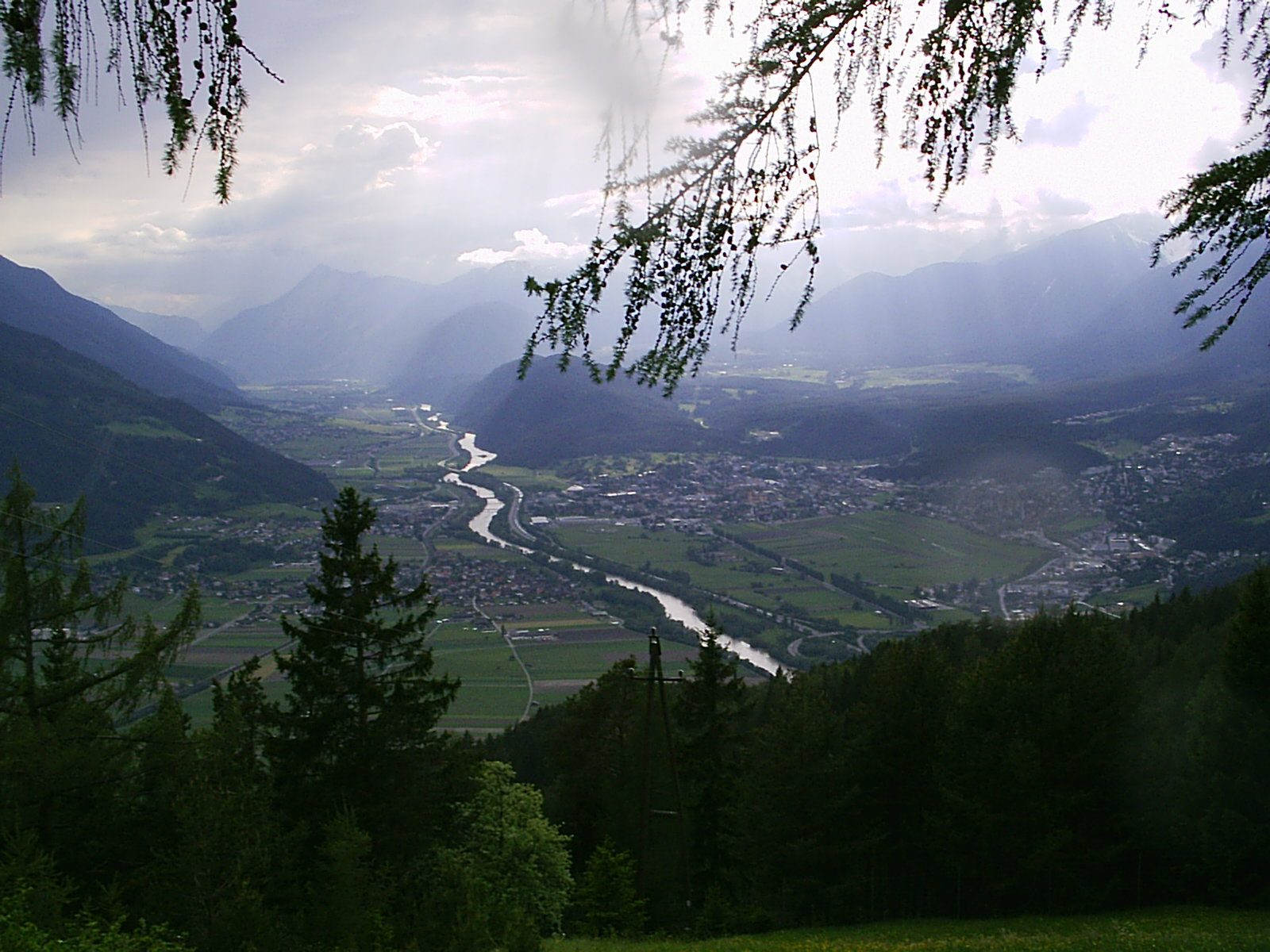
Mountain valleys of industrialised countries (e.g. Inn valley) are often periurbanised.

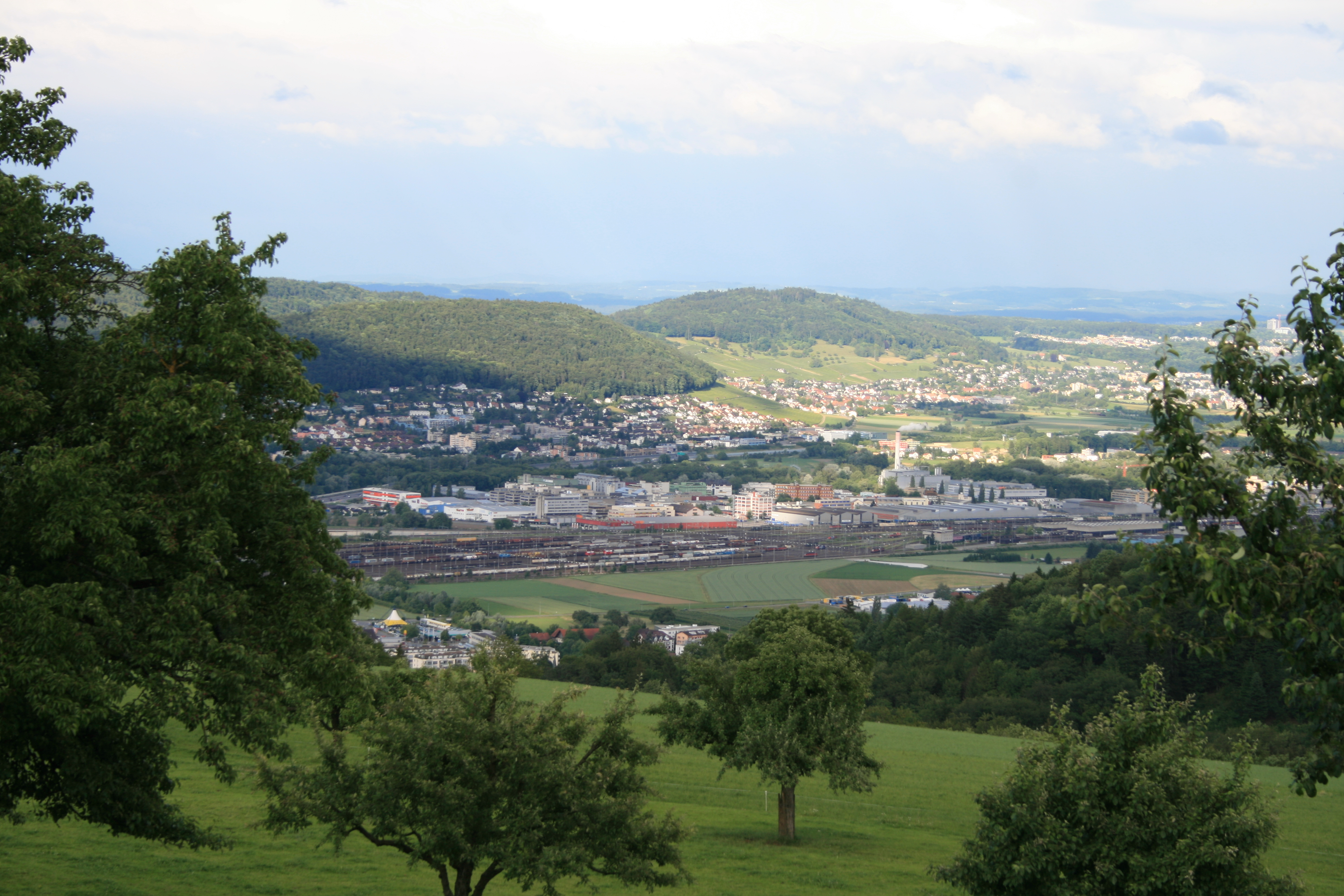
The periurbanised Swiss Limmat Valley.

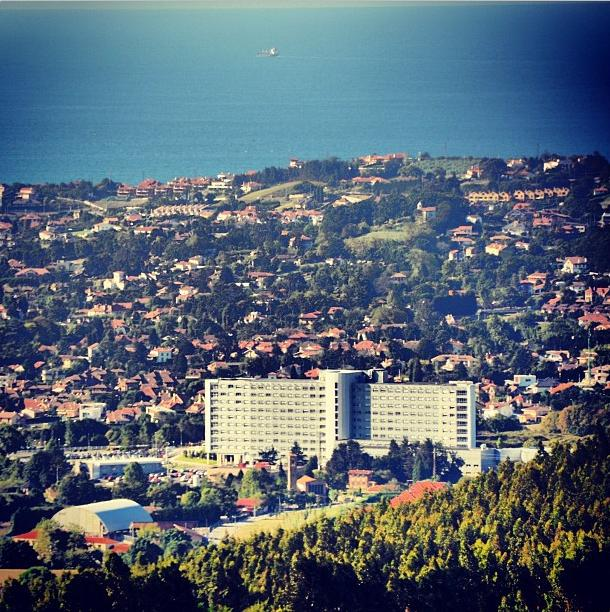
Hospital in a peri-urban area in Gijón.

Peri-urbanisation relates to the processes of scattered and dispersive urban growth that create hybrid landscapes of fragmented and mixed urban and rural characteristics. Such areas may be referred to as the rural–urban fringe, the outskirts or the urban hinterland.

== Etymology ==
The expression originates from the French word périurbanisation ("peri-urban" meaning "around urban"), which is used by the INSEE (the French statistics agency) to describe spaces—between the city and the countryside—that are shaped by the fragmented urbanisation of former rural areas in the urban fringe, both in a qualitative (e.g. diffusion of urban lifestyle) and in a quantitative (e.g. new residential zones) sense. It is frequently seen as a result of post-modernity. In science, the term was used initially in France and Switzerland.

== Structure and function ==
Peri-urban areas (also called urban space, outskirts or the hinterland) are defined by the structure resulting from the process of peri-urbanisation. It can be described as the landscape interface or ecotone between town and countryside, or also as the rural—urban transition zone where urban and rural uses and functions mix and often clash. It can thus be viewed as a new landscape type in its own right, one forged from an interaction of urban and rural land use.

Its definition shifts depending on the global location, but typically in Europe where suburban areas are intensively managed to prevent urban sprawl and protect agricultural land, the urban fringe will be characterised by certain land uses which have either purposely moved from the urban area or require much larger tracts of land. As examples:

- Roads, especially motorways and bypasses
- Waste transfer stations, recycling facilities and landfill sites
- Park and ride sites
- Airports
- Large hospitals
- Power, water and sewerage facilities
- Factories
- Large out-of-town shopping facilities, e.g. large supermarkets
- High-density residential buildings

Despite these urban uses, the fringe remains largely open with the majority of the land for agricultural, woodland or other rural uses. The quality of living of the countryside around urban areas tends to be low with severance between areas of open land and poorly maintained woodlands and hedgerows with the scattered urban facilities.

"Peri-urbanisation" is also sometimes used to fill the gap between suburbanisation and exurbanisation, and thus relates moreover to the movement of people in space. In this case, it implies the expansion of functional rural-urban linkages such as by commuting.

In the United States, urban areas are defined as contiguous territory having a density of at least 1,000 persons per square mile, though in some areas the density may be as low as 500 per square mile. Urban areas also include outlying territory of less density if it is connected to the core of the contiguous area by road and within 2.5 road miles of that core, or within 5 road miles but separated by water or other undevelopable territory. Territory with population density below 1,000 people per square mile is included in the urban fringe if it eliminates an enclave or closes an indentation in the boundary of the urbanized area.

== See also ==
- Desakota
- European Association of Periurban Parks (FEDENATUR)
- Peri Urban Regions Platform Europe
- Peri-urban agriculture
- Urban sprawl
- Urban village
- Urban vitality
- Wildland–urban interface
