= W Mitchell =

American mayor

- Born: William John Schiff III; April 11, 1943 (age 83)
- Occupations: Activist; Businessman; Marine
- Military career
- Allegiance: United States
- Branch: United States Marine Corps

W Mitchell (born William John Schiff III; April 11, 1943) is an American motivational speaker and businessman. He is a former member of the United States Marine Corps, burn victim, paraplegic, and a former small-town mayor.

== Early life ==
Mitchell was born William John Schiff III. He subsequently changed his name to W Mitchell in honor of his stepfather, Luke Mitchell.

== Career ==
At the time of his first injury, Mitchell was a gripman on a cable car route in San Francisco. After his burn accident and recovery, Mitchell completed his training as a pilot and in 1975 co-founded a company called Vermont Castings along with Murray Howell and Duncan Syme. The company made energy-efficient wood-burning stoves and was later valued at $65 million. It was on a business trip for this company where Mitchell injured his spinal cord. In 1977 he was elected Mayor of Crested Butte, Colorado, where he stopped AMAX (now Freeport-McMoRan) from building a billion-dollar molybdenum mine on Mount Emmons. Because of the anticipated environmental impact, Mitchell claims that he "saved a mountain."

Mitchell lectures are often titled "Taking Responsibility For Change". His message often paraphrases the quote of Epictetus: "It's not what happens to you, but how you react to it that matters."

== Personal injuries ==
Mitchell was burned over 65% of his body on July 19, 1971, when a laundry truck turned in front of the motorcycle he was riding in San Francisco. His face and hands were badly scarred and his fingers were badly burned and he lost most of each of his ten fingers. He had just completed his first solo aircraft flight. He later won a $500,000 settlement in a lawsuit against Honda Inc. because the gas cap on his Honda CB750 was deemed faulty for having fallen off during the accident.

On November 11, 1975, he crashed on takeoff in a small aircraft he was piloting due to ice on the wings and injured his spinal cord, leaving him paralyzed from the waist down, but his other passengers escaped injury. The NTSB investigation indicated that the accident was due to his failure to detect the thin layer of ice on the wings during his pre-flight inspection.

== Personal life ==
Mitchell is a millionaire. He lives in Santa Barbara, California and maintains a second home in Hawaii.

== Book ==
- The Man Who Would Not Be Defeated (with Brad Lemley) (1993) ISBN 1-56796-026-X
- It's Not What Happens To You, It's What You Do About It (1997) ISBN 0-9637901-0-2
