= Oh-be-joyful Creek =

Stream in Gunnison County, Colorado, U.S.

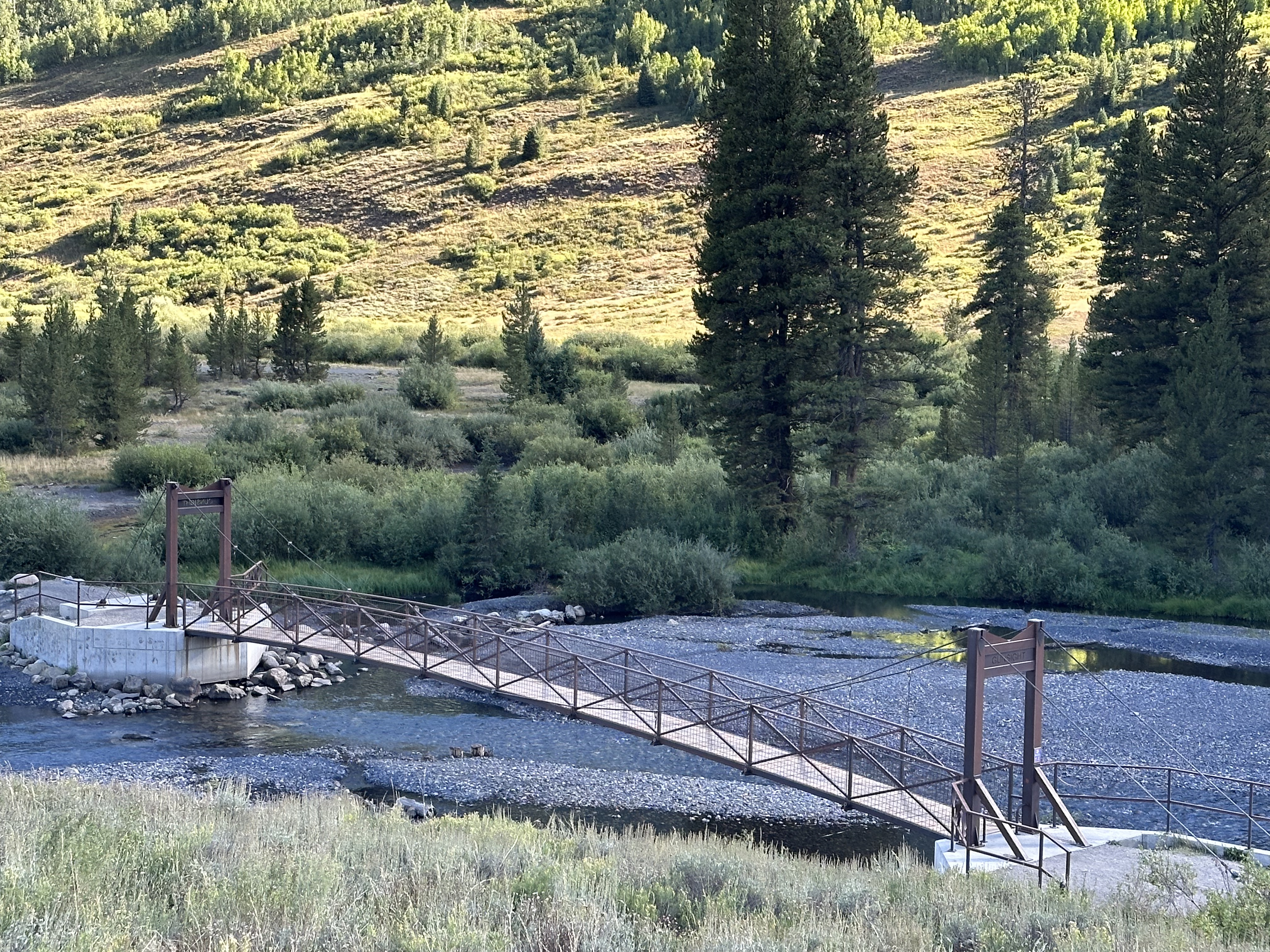
- Bridge over Oh-be-joyful Creek

- Location in Colorado

Location
- Country: United States
- State: Colorado
- County: Gunnison County

Physical characteristics
- Source: East slope of the Ruby Range
- Mouth: Slate River
  - coordinates: 38°54′28.0″N 107°01′29.0″W

Basin features
- River system: Colorado River basin
- GNIS ID: U.S. Geological Survey Geographic Names Information System: Oh-be-joyful Creek

Oh-be-joyful Creek is a stream in Gunnison County, Colorado, in the United States.

Oh-be-joyful Creek was so named in the 19th century after valuable ore was discovered in the gulch.

The creek's headwaters form on the east slope of the Ruby Range in the vicinity of Oh-be-joyful Peak and Afley Peak. The creek is a tributary of the Slate River.

== See also ==
- List of rivers of Colorado
