= Mount Owen (Colorado) =

Mountain in the American state of Colorado

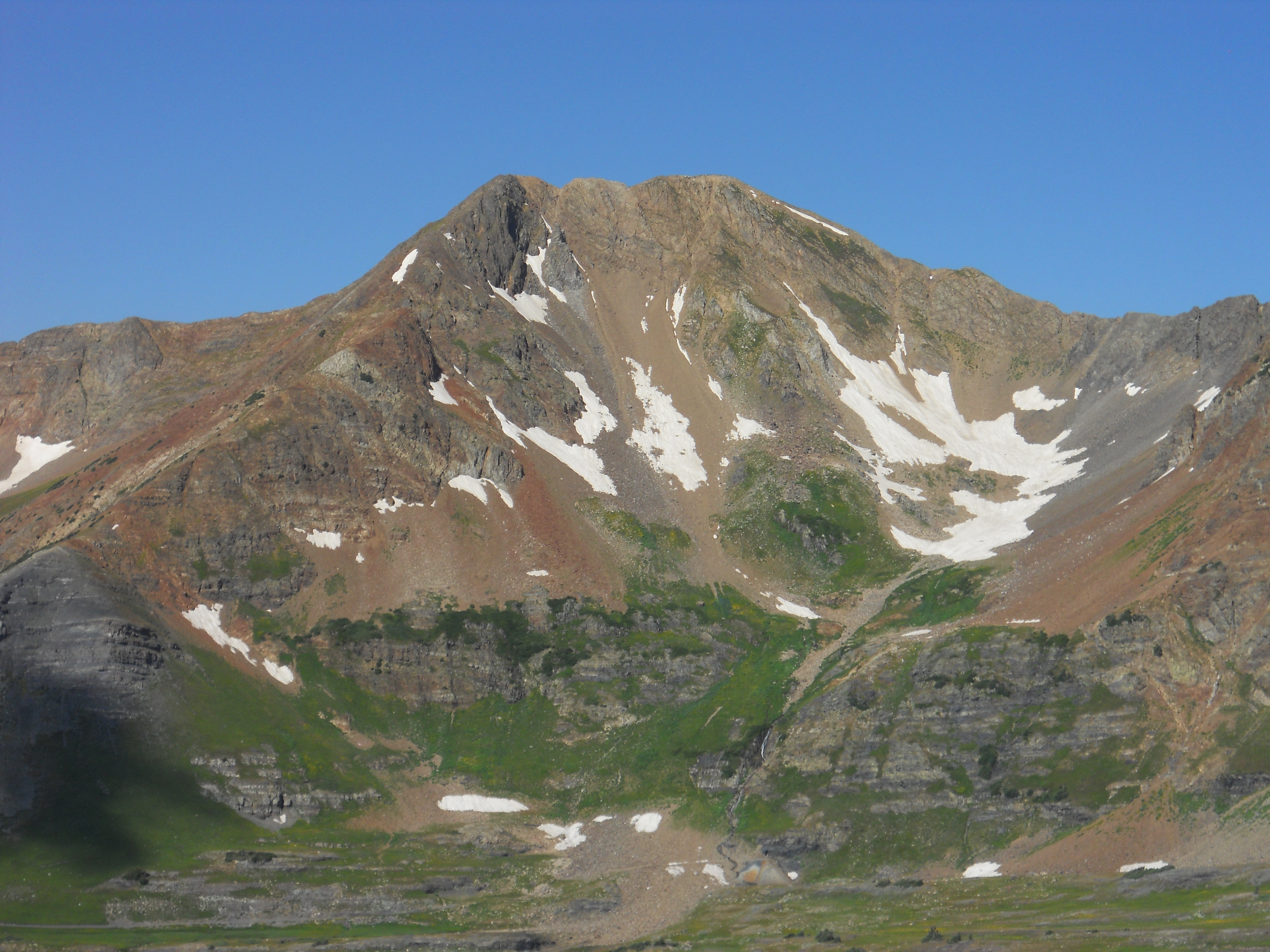
- Mount Owen

Highest point
- Elevation: 13,070 ft (3,984 m)
- Prominence: 1,358 ft (414 m)
- Isolation: 7.39 mi (11.89 km)
- Listing: Colorado range high points
- Coordinates: 38°54′33″N 107°07′30″W

Geography
- Location within Colorado
- Location: Gunnison County, Colorado, U.S.
- Parent range: Elk Mountains, Highest summit of the Ruby Range
- Topo map(s): USGS 7.5' topographic map Oh-be-joyful, Colorado

Mount Owen is the highest summit of the Ruby Range of the Rocky Mountains of North America. The 13,070-foot (3,984 m) thirteener is located in Gunnison National Forest at the edge of the Raggeds Wilderness, 8.5 miles (13.6 km) west-northwest (bearing 290°) of the Town of Crested Butte in Gunnison County, Colorado, United States.

== See also ==
- List of Colorado mountain ranges
- List of Colorado mountain summits
  - List of Colorado fourteeners
  - List of Colorado 4000 meter prominent summits
  - List of the most prominent summits of Colorado
- List of Colorado county high points
