= Peri Urban Regions Platform Europe =

Peri Urban Regions Platform Europe (PURPLE) is a network of European regions. It addresses the virtues and needs of the zone around the core cities of metropolitan areas. This peri-urban area is home to a large proportion of Europe's population and the location of companies from both the services and manufacturing sector, and of agriculture. PURPLE members feel that this zone is not addressed satisfactorily in European as well as national and regional plans and strategies.

== See also ==
- Peri-urbanisation
- FEDENATUR - European Association of Periurban Parks
