= Crested Butte Wildflower Festival =

Annual July festival in Crested Butte, Colorado

Coordinates: 38.870°N 106.988°W

The Crested Butte Wild Flower Festival is a week-long event that takes place annually in July in Crested Butte, Colorado, United States. Established in 1986, the flower-focused festival includes hikes, tours, workshops and performances, and raises awareness of environmental issues, including the importance of preserving wild flowers in the city. Thousands of artists, vendors and people from all over the world gather in the town of Crested Butte for a weekend of art, food, dancing and music.

There was no festival in 2020.
