= Colorado State Highway 135 =

State highway in Colorado, United States

State Highway 135
- SH 135 highlighted in red

Route information
- Maintained by CDOT
- Length: 27.48 mi (44.22 km)

Major junctions
- South end: US 50 in Gunnison
- North end: 6th Street / Elk Avenue in Crested Butte

Location
- Country: United States
- State: Colorado
- Counties: Gunnison

Highway system
- Colorado State Highway System; Interstate; US; State; Scenic
← SH 134	→ SH 136

State Highway 135 (SH 135) is a 27.48-mile-long (44.22 km) state highway in the U.S. state of Colorado. SH 135's southern terminus is at U.S. Route 50 (US 50) in Gunnison, and the northern terminus is at 6th Street in Crested Butte. It is the primary connection between Crested Butte and the outside world and is the only paved road leading to Crested Butte.

== Route description ==
It begins at the intersection of U.S. Highway 50 and Main Street in Gunnison and follows Main Street North out of town. Between miles 10 and 11, it passes through the community of Almont. It terminates at the intersection of Elk Avenue and 6th Street (the Four Way Stop) in Crested Butte.

== History ==
The route was established in the 1920s, when it began at SH 92 in Hotchkiss and ended at Gunnison. The route was paved from its southern terminus to Paonia and from Almont to Gunnison by 1950. SH 135 was split into two discontinuous sections in 1954 when the segment over Kebler Pass was turned back to Gunnison County. The route was completely paved by 1958. The section between Hotchkiss and Bardine was renumbered in 1970 as an extension of SH 133, leaving what is left today.

== Major intersections ==
The entire route is in Gunnison County.

Location	mi	km	Destinations	Notes
Gunnison	0.000	0.000	US 50 – Salida, Montrose	Southern terminus
Crested Butte	27.484	44.231	6th Street / Elk Avenue	Northern terminus
1.000 mi = 1.609 km; 1.000 km = 0.621 mi
