= Star Peak (Colorado) =

Mountain in Colorado, United States

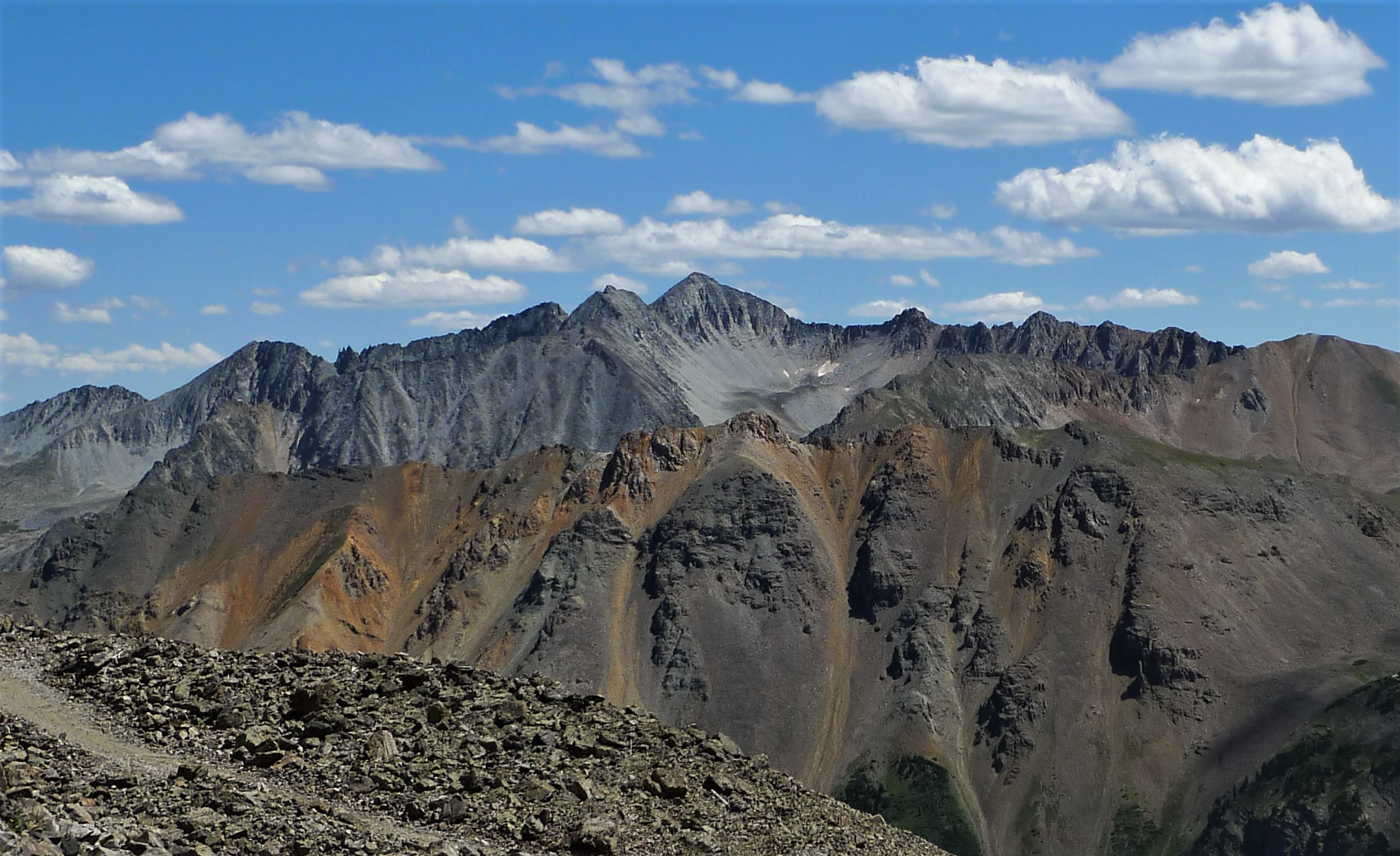
- Northwest aspect centered at top (Greg Mace Peak in front)

Highest point
- Elevation: 13,527 ft (4,123 m)
- Prominence: 817 ft (249 m)
- Parent peak: Castle Peak (14,279 ft)
- Isolation: 3.92 mi (6.31 km)
- Coordinates: 38°58′46″N 106°47′58″W

Geography
- Location within Colorado Location within the United States
- Country: United States
- State: Colorado
- County: Gunnison County / Pitkin County
- Parent range: Rocky Mountains; Elk Mountains
- Topo map: USGS Pearl Pass

Climbing
- Easiest route: class 2+ scrambling

Star Peak is a 13,527-foot (4,123 m) summit on the shared border between Gunnison County and Pitkin County in Colorado, United States.

== Description ==
Star Peak is situated 12 miles (19 km) west of the Continental Divide in the Elk Mountains which are a subrange of the Rocky Mountains. The mountain is located 15 miles (24 km) south of the community of Aspen and set on the boundary shared by White River National Forest and Gunnison National Forest. It ranks as the fourth-highest peak within the Gunnison National Forest. Precipitation runoff from the mountain's north slope drains to the Roaring Fork River via Cooper Creek and Castle Creek, the east slope drains into headwaters of the Taylor River, and the south slope drains into East Brush Creek which is a tributary of the East River. Topographic relief is modest as the summit rises over 2,100 feet (640 m) above Taylor River in one mile (1.6 km). The mountain's toponym has been officially adopted by the United States Board on Geographic Names, and has been recorded in publications since at least 1899.

== Climate ==
According to the Köppen climate classification system, Star Peak is located in an alpine subarctic climate zone with cold, snowy winters, and cool to warm summers. Due to its altitude, it receives precipitation all year, as snow in winter, and as thunderstorms in summer, with a dry period in late spring.

== See also ==
- List of mountain peaks of Colorado
- Thirteener
