= Purple Mountain (Oregon) =

Mountain in Oregon, United States

Highest point
- Elevation: 711 m (2,333 ft)
- Prominence: 92 m (302 ft)
- Coordinates: 42°42′10″N 124°21′11″W

Geography
- Location: Curry County, Oregon, U.S.
- Parent range: Oregon Coast Range
- Topo map: USGS Father Mountain

Purple Mountain is a 2,333-foot (711 m) mountain in the southwest portion of the U.S. state of Oregon. It is one of many densely forested peaks located in the Oregon Coast Range.

Purple Mountain is located in Siskiyou National Forest, 10.5 kilometres (6.5 mi) northeast of Humbug Mountain, which rises from the Pacific Ocean along the Oregon coastline. The Elk River passes by the northern base of the mountain some 2,000 feet (610 m) below the peak, only 900 metres (0.56 mi) away.
