= The Color Purple (disambiguation) =

The Color Purple is a 1982 novel by Alice Walker.

The Color Purple may also refer to:

- The Color Purple (1985 film), a 1985 film directed by Steven Spielberg, based on the novel
  - The Color Purple (1985 soundtrack)
- The Color Purple (musical), a 2005 musical based on the novel
- The Color Purple (2023 film), a film adaptation of the 2005 musical
  - The Color Purple (2023 soundtrack)
- Be Range Arghavan, a 2010 Iranian film directed by Ebrahim Hatamikia

== See also ==
- Purple, a color
