= European Association of Periurban Parks =

FEDENATUR - European Association of Periurban Parks
- Founded: April 1997, Barcelona, Spain
- Type: International Organization
- Purpose: Periurban Parks, Biodiversity, Nature in cities
- Headquarters: Carretera de l’Església, 92, 08017 Barcelona, Spain
- Region served: Europe
- Key people: Marià Martí (Director General) Josep Perpinyà (President)
- Website: www.fedenatur.org

The European Association of Periurban Parks (FEDENATUR) is an association of natural, fluvial and agricultural parks located in metropolitan and periurban areas in Europe. It is headquartered in the Serra de Collserola Natural Park in Barcelona.

FEDENATUR was created in 1997 after the 2nd Symposium on natural areas in periurban and metropolitan zones in Barcelona in 1995. It was inspired by the Rio Earth Summit of 1992.

Conference participants decided to create a network of exchanges between periurban park managers on a European scale. Over 75% of the European population lives in urban and periurban zones. Contrary to "national parks" usually located far from densely populated urban areas and designed exclusively for preservation, the natural areas in periurban zones have to protect biodiversity while being frequented by a large public.

== Projects ==
FEDENATUR has promoted and participated in three European Interreg projects to technical exchanges and raising awareness on the concept of Periurban Parks.

FEDENATUR has also conducted two surveys. The first (in 2004) to identify periurban parks and list their functions (environmental, social, economic). The second one (2009–2012) to analyse more deeply the characteristics of different periurban parks regarding management, social use and equipment.

In 2005, FEDENATUR joined the European Habitats Forum (EHF), which assembles leading European nature conservation organisations to provide advice on the implementation and future development of EU biodiversity policy.

In 2008, FEDENATUR promoted a Recommendation – that was approved- at the IUCN World Congress in favour of protecting periurban natural areas around cities and metropolitan areas.

FEDENATUR is currently giving input through different documents and mechanisms into the current EC Green Infrastructure Strategy.

== FEDENATUR members ==
- Parc Natural de la Serra de Collserola - Barcelona
- Grand Parc Miribel Jonage - Lyon
- Parco Agricolo Sud Milano - Milan
- Green Belt of Vitoria-Gasteiz - Vitoria-Gasteiz
- Forêts rhénanes périurbaines - Strasbourg
- Monsanto Forest Park - Lisbon
- Arche de la Nature - Le Mans
- Xarxa Parcs Naturals Barcelona - Barcelona Province
- Espaces Nature de Tours - Tours
- Parco di Portofino - Genoa
- Espace Naturel Lille Métropole - Lille
- RomaNatura - Rome
- Parc de l’Espai d’Interès Natural de Gallecs - Mollet del Vallès
- Forêt de Soignes - Sonian Forest - Bruxelles
- - Milan
- Aree protette del Po e della Collina Torinese - Torino
- Espaces Verts Seine-Saint-Denis - Bobigny, Paris
- Parco di Montemarcello-Magra - Sarzana
- Red de Espacios Naturales Protegidos de Andalucía
- Parc agrari de Sabadell - Parc Fluvial del Ripoll - Sabadell
- Parc Devesa-Albufera - Valencia
- Parco della Piana - Florence
- Communauté d'agglomération Grenoble Alpes Métropole
- Parco delle Groane - Milan
- Mount Hymettus Aesthetic Forest - Athens, Attica
- Parco fluviale Gesso e Stura - Cuneo
- SPAY - Union for the Protection and Development of Hymettus Mountain - Vyronas, Attica
- Metropolitan Association of Upper Silesia - Katowice
- Natural Park Drahán - Troja, Prague

== See also ==
- Peri-urbanisation
