= Almont, Colorado =

Unincorporated community in Gunnison County, Colorado, United States

- Unincorporated community
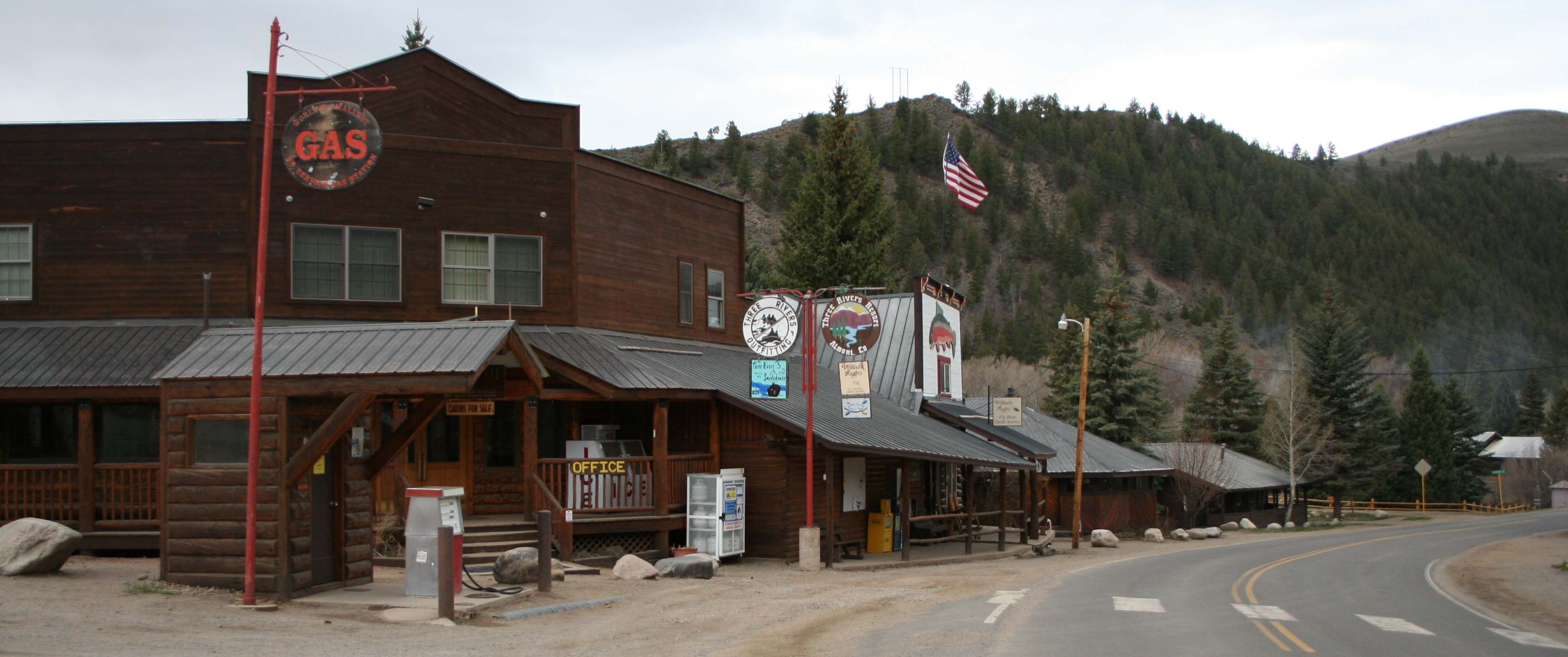
- The business section of Almont

- Location of Almont, Colorado. Almont (Colorado)
- Coordinates: 38°39′53″N 106°50′46″W
- Country: United States
- State: Colorado
- County: Gunnison
- Platted: 1881

Government
  - Type: Unincorporated community
  - Body: Gunnison County
- Elevation: 8,022 ft (2,445 m)
- Time zone: UTC−07:00 (MST)
  - Summer (DST): UTC−06:00 (MDT)
- ZIP Code: 81210
- GNIS pop ID: 188934

Almont is an unincorporated community and U.S. Post Office in Gunnison County, Colorado, United States. The ZIP Code of the Almont Post Office is 81210.

== History ==
The town of Almont was platted in 1881 on the Fisher Ranch. Samual Fisher allegedly named the town for Almont of Kentucky, the horse that sired his favorite stallion. The Almont, Colorado, post office opened on March 6, 1882. In the late 19th century, miners in the area brought their ore to Almont, where it was transported by train to Gunnison. In its present form, the town consists of two four-season resorts and a small year-round population.

== Geography ==
Almont is located on State Highway 135 about 10 miles (16 km) north of the city of Gunnison. The Taylor River and East River meet in Almont where they become the Gunnison River as it flows southwest.

== See also ==
- List of populated places in Colorado
