= Slate River (Colorado) =

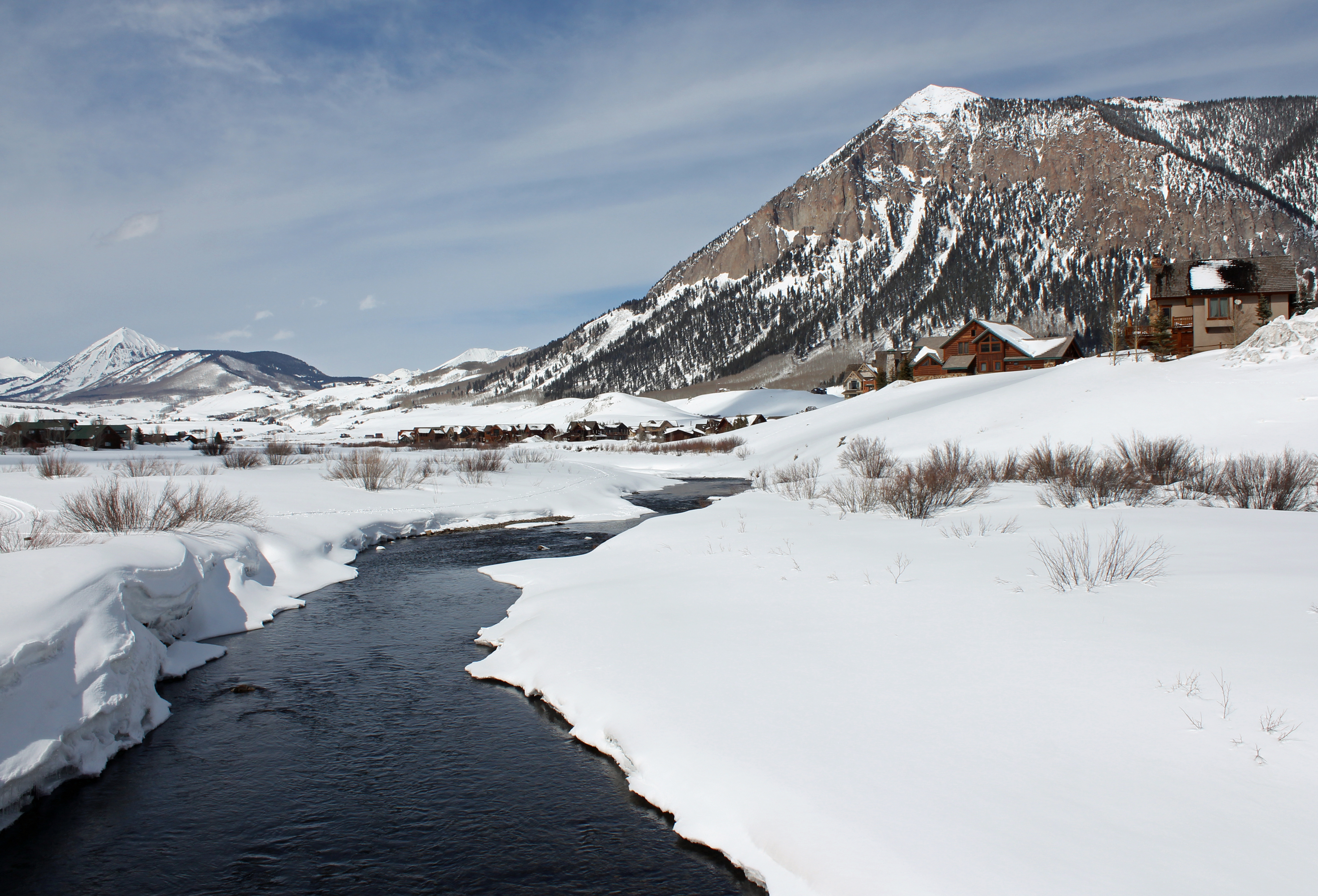
- The river as it passes through the Skyland neighborhood of Crested Butte, March 2014

Physical characteristics
- Source
  - coordinates: 38°59′52″N 107°05′34″W
- Mouth
  - location: Confluence with East River
  - coordinates: 38°48′49″N 106°53′57″W

Basin features
- Progression: East—Gunnison—Colorado

Slate River is a 23.7-mile-long (38.1 km) tributary of the East River in Gunnison County, Colorado, United States. It flows south from a source near Yule Pass in the Raggeds Wilderness to a confluence with the East River southeast of Crested Butte, Colorado.

A BLM-managed campground named Oh Be Joyful lies along the river.

== Usage and conservation ==
Recreational use of the Slate River has risen rapidly during the 2010s. In response, the nearby town of Crested Butte, the Crested Butte Land Trust, the Bureau of Land Management, Colorado Parks and Wildlife, and other people and organizations formed a working group to focus on preserving the river's water quality and ecosystem.

== See also ==
- List of rivers of Colorado
- List of tributaries of the Colorado River
