= East River (Colorado) =

River in Gunnison County, Colorado, United States

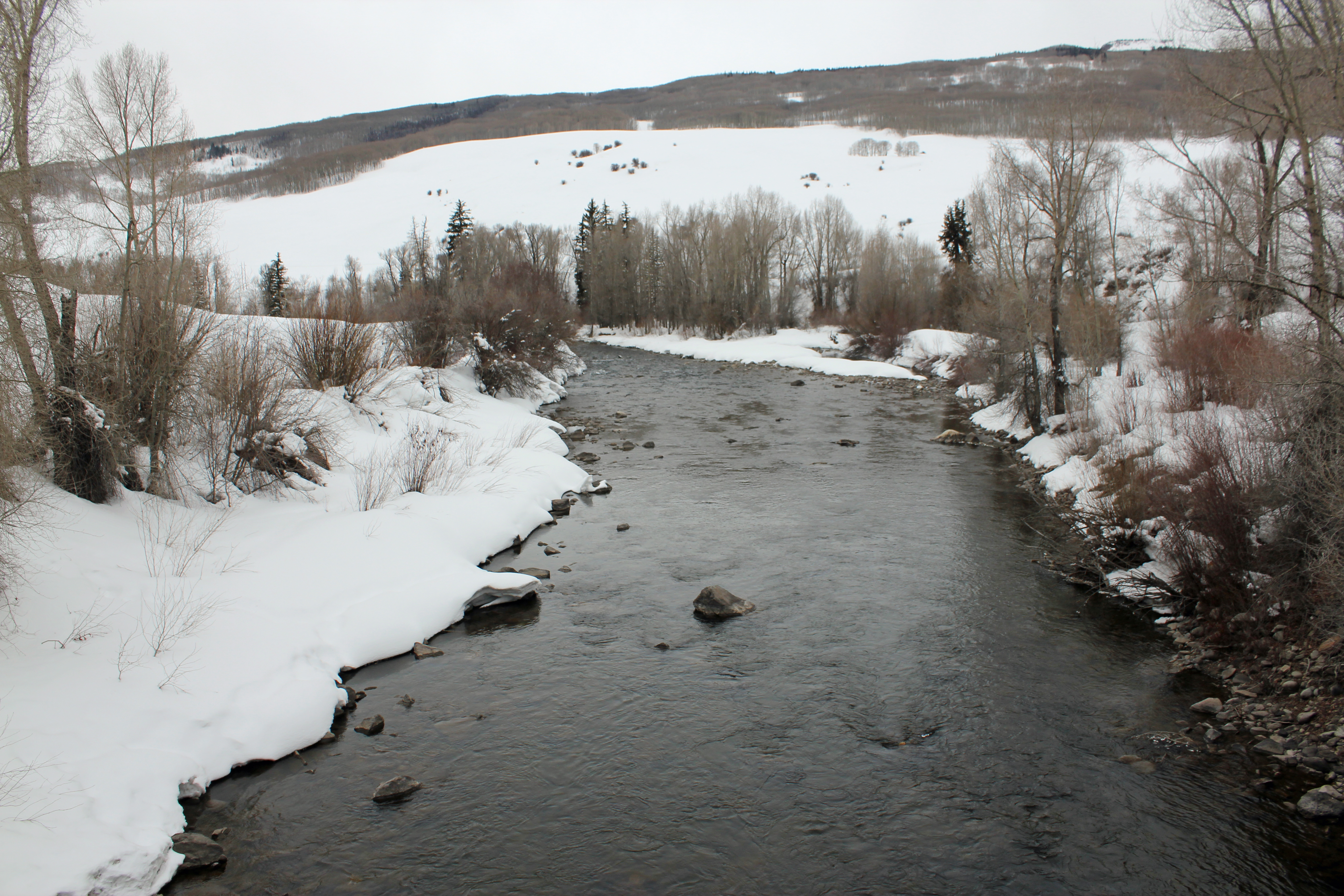
- The river in March 2014

Physical characteristics
- Source
  - location: Emerald Lake
  - coordinates: 39°00′29″N 107°02′29″W
- Mouth
  - location: Confluence with Taylor River
  - coordinates: 38°39′49″N 106°50′50″W
  - elevation: 8,005 ft (2,440 m)

Basin features
- Progression: Gunnison—Colorado
- Tributaries
  - right: Slate River

East River is a 38.3-mile-long (61.6 km) stream in Gunnison County, Colorado, United States. It flows south from Emerald Lake in the Maroon Bells Wilderness to a confluence with the Taylor River that forms the Gunnison River.

== See also ==
- List of rivers of Colorado
- List of tributaries of the Colorado River
