= Raggeds Wilderness =

Wilderness area in Colorado, United States

- IUCN category Ib (wilderness area)
- Location within the United States
- Location: Gunnison County, Colorado, United States
- Nearest city: Crested Butte, CO
- Coordinates: 38°58′00″N 107°10′00″W
- Area: 65,393 acres (264.64 km^{2})
- Established: 1980
- Governing body: U.S. Forest Service

The Raggeds Wilderness is a U.S. Wilderness Area located in the Elk Mountains northwest of Crested Butte, Colorado. The 65,393-acre (264.64 km^{2}) wilderness was established in 1980 in the White River and Gunnison National Forests. Elevations in the wilderness range from 6,840 feet (2,080 m) in Dark Canyon to 13,535 feet (4,125 m) at the summit of Treasure Mountain. Nearly 90 miles (140 km) of trails are within the wilderness.
