= Crested Butte, Colorado =

Town in Colorado, US

- Home rule town
- Town of Crested Butte
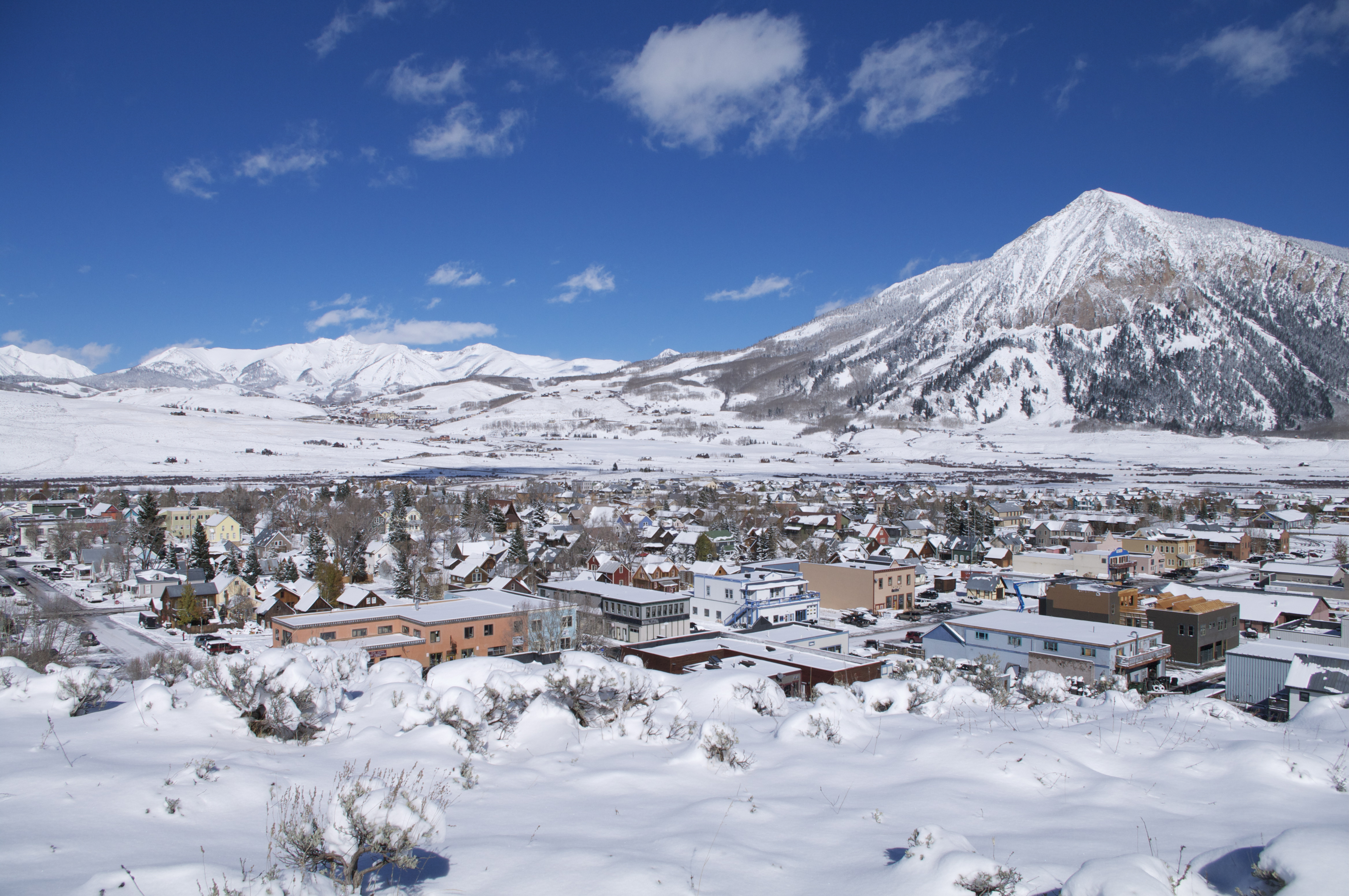
- Crested Butte – the town and mountain
- Nicknames: Wildflower Capital of Colorado
- Location of the Town of Crested Butte in Gunnison County, Colorado
- Coordinates: 38°52′16″N 106°58′39″W
- Country: United States
- State: Colorado
- County: Gunnison
- Incorporated: July 15, 1880

Government
  - Type: Home rule town

Area
  - Total: 0.836 sq mi (2.166 km^{2})
  - Land: 0.836 sq mi (2.166 km^{2})
  - Water: 0 sq mi (0.0 km^{2})
- Elevation: 8,924 ft (2,720 m)

Population (2020)
  - Total: 1,639
  - Density: 1,960/sq mi (760/km^{2})
- Time zone: UTC−07:00 (MST)
  - Summer (DST): UTC−06:00 (MDT)
- ZIP Codes: 81224 & 81225 (PO Box)
- Area codes: 970/748
- GNIS town ID: 2412385
- FIPS code: 08-18310
- Website: townofcrestedbutte.colorado.gov

Crested Butte is a home rule town located in Gunnison County, Colorado, United States. The town population was 1,639 at the 2020 United States census. A former coal mining town nestled in the Slate River Valley, Crested Butte is now known as a destination for skiing, mountain biking, and outdoor activities.

== History ==
The East River Valley where Crested Butte is located was once used as a summer residence by the Ute people. However, they were quickly displaced when European-Americans first entered the area. The first white people to explore the valley were beaver trappers, shortly followed by surveyors. Captain John Gunnison, after whom Gunnison County is named, was one of the early explorers to enter the area, leading an expedition in 1853.

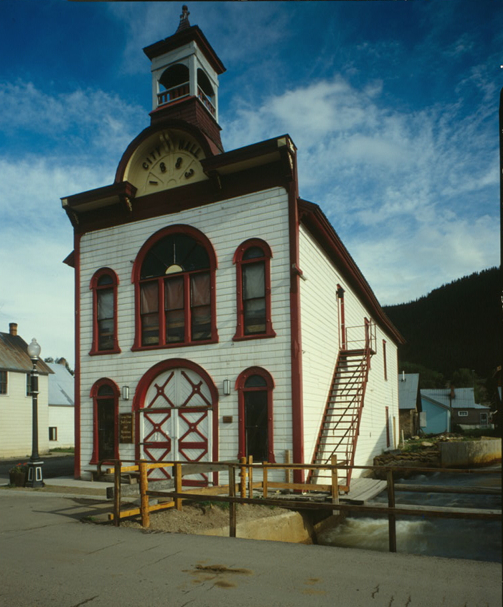
Old Town Hall, built 1883

In the 1860s and 1870s coal and silver mines began to open in the surrounding area, and many little mining towns formed. The Crested Butte, Colorado, post office opened on May 26, 1879, and the Town of Crested Butte was incorporated on July 15, 1880.

Mining, along with ranching, formed the nexus of the local economy. However, when silver mining began to decline, many of these towns failed. Crested Butte, however, was in a better position to survive because it served as a supply town to the surrounding area. When the coal mines closed, the town began to shrink, and eventually the local high school was closed. After graduating the class of 1965 (from 1966 until 1990), the Crested Butte public school only facilitated K-5 students, while 6th grade and higher attended school in Gunnison.

The town did not revive until a ski area was built on Crested Butte Mountain in the 1960s. The ski resort was constructed on the former Malensek Ranch, in what is now the neighboring community of Mt. Crested Butte. The resort rapidly revitalized the town's economy around tourism. As a result of the renewed growth, Crested Butte began to offer middle school in the railroad depot building in 1990. In 1992, a new middle school was completed which allowed the public school to facilitate grades K through 8. Finally in 1997, a new facility for the Crested Butte Community School was completed. This included the addition of a public high school so that the school now serves students in grades K-12. In 1993 the Crested Butte Academy opened in Crested Butte, bringing a private high school into town. However, on July 9, 2008, the academy was closed permanently due to financial difficulties that had plagued its entire existence.

The town has changed from a mining town to a tourist retreat catering to the affluent as the ski resort has taken over the local economy. This has led to a housing crisis- the average home in Crested Butte is worth over $900,000.

The Colorado General Assembly in 1990 designated Crested Butte the Wildflower Capital of Colorado.

== Geography ==
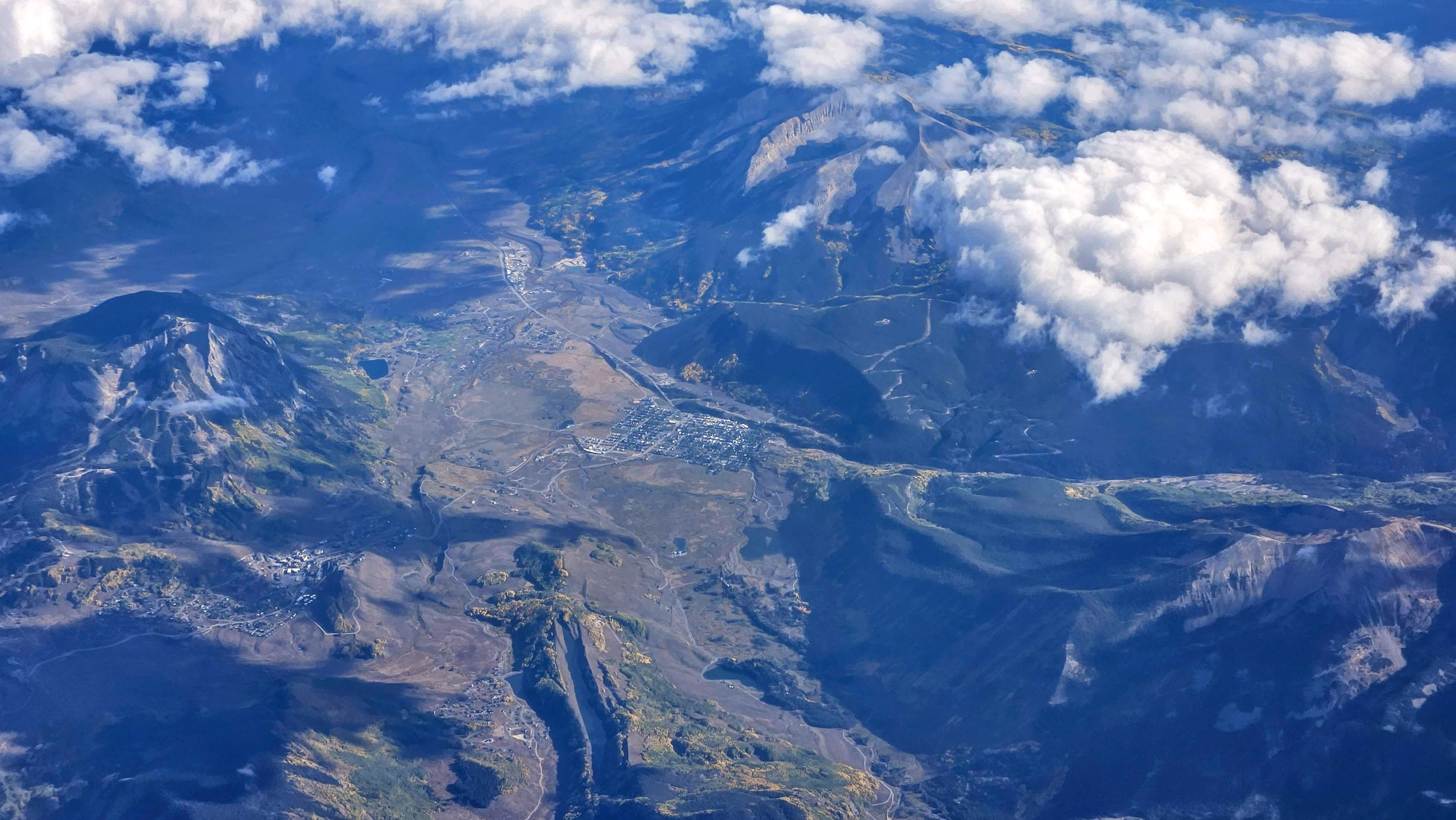
Crested Butte from above in September 2023.

Crested Butte is in north-central Gunnison County on the west side of the valley of the Slate River, along Coal Creek. Colorado State Highway 135 runs south from Crested Butte 27 miles (43 km) to Gunnison, the county seat.

At the 2020 United States census, the town had a total area of 535 acres (2.166 km^{2}), all of it land. Crested Butte lies at an elevation of 8,885 feet (2,708 m) above sea level.

=== Climate ===
The climate type is dominated by the winter season, a long, bitterly cold period with short, clear days, relatively little precipitation in the form of rain, but massive amounts in the form of snow, and low humidity. The Köppen Climate Classification sub-type for this climate is Dfc (Continental Subarctic Climate). The record snowfall amount was 415 inches in the 1977/1978 winter season.

Climate data for Crested Butte, Colorado, 1991–2020 normals, extremes 1910–present
| Month | Jan | Feb | Mar | Apr | May | Jun | Jul | Aug | Sep | Oct | Nov | Dec | Year |
|---|---|---|---|---|---|---|---|---|---|---|---|---|---|
| Record high °F (°C) | 54 (12) | 52 (11) | 58 (14) | 72 (22) | 80 (27) | 89 (32) | 89 (32) | 91 (33) | 87 (31) | 78 (26) | 69 (21) | 60 (16) | 91 (33) |
| Mean maximum °F (°C) | 38.0 (3.3) | 42.4 (5.8) | 50.5 (10.3) | 61.1 (16.2) | 71.7 (22.1) | 80.2 (26.8) | 83.8 (28.8) | 81.0 (27.2) | 77.0 (25.0) | 68.9 (20.5) | 55.7 (13.2) | 41.3 (5.2) | 84.4 (29.1) |
| Mean daily maximum °F (°C) | 25.8 (−3.4) | 29.4 (−1.4) | 37.0 (2.8) | 46.9 (8.3) | 58.3 (14.6) | 70.2 (21.2) | 76.1 (24.5) | 73.5 (23.1) | 65.9 (18.8) | 54.3 (12.4) | 39.4 (4.1) | 26.8 (−2.9) | 50.3 (10.2) |
| Daily mean °F (°C) | 9.6 (−12.4) | 13.7 (−10.2) | 22.4 (−5.3) | 33.0 (0.6) | 43.4 (6.3) | 51.9 (11.1) | 57.8 (14.3) | 55.9 (13.3) | 48.6 (9.2) | 38.2 (3.4) | 24.3 (−4.3) | 11.3 (−11.5) | 34.2 (1.2) |
| Mean daily minimum °F (°C) | −6.5 (−21.4) | −2.1 (−18.9) | 7.0 (−13.9) | 19.1 (−7.2) | 28.5 (−1.9) | 33.7 (0.9) | 39.5 (4.2) | 38.4 (3.6) | 31.2 (−0.4) | 22.0 (−5.6) | 9.3 (−12.6) | −4.2 (−20.1) | 18.0 (−7.8) |
| Mean minimum °F (°C) | −27.8 (−33.2) | −25.4 (−31.9) | −16.4 (−26.9) | 3.0 (−16.1) | 17.4 (−8.1) | 25.6 (−3.6) | 31.3 (−0.4) | 30.6 (−0.8) | 20.2 (−6.6) | 7.0 (−13.9) | −15.4 (−26.3) | −26.1 (−32.3) | −31.0 (−35.0) |
| Record low °F (°C) | −43 (−42) | −47 (−44) | −42 (−41) | −17 (−27) | −1 (−18) | 15 (−9) | 17 (−8) | 17 (−8) | 3 (−16) | −13 (−25) | −30 (−34) | −39 (−39) | −47 (−44) |
| Average precipitation inches (mm) | 2.72 (69) | 2.54 (65) | 2.09 (53) | 2.01 (51) | 1.52 (39) | 0.93 (24) | 1.96 (50) | 1.98 (50) | 1.95 (50) | 1.71 (43) | 2.04 (52) | 2.31 (59) | 23.76 (605) |
| Average snowfall inches (cm) | 42.2 (107) | 35.2 (89) | 29.1 (74) | 19.4 (49) | 6.7 (17) | 0.3 (0.76) | 0.0 (0.0) | 0.0 (0.0) | 1.2 (3.0) | 8.5 (22) | 25.3 (64) | 35.1 (89) | 203.0 (516) |
| Average extreme snow depth inches (cm) | 32.9 (84) | 39.9 (101) | 37.7 (96) | 19.0 (48) | 3.7 (9.4) | 0.1 (0.25) | 0.0 (0.0) | 0.0 (0.0) | 0.3 (0.76) | 3.0 (7.6) | 11.7 (30) | 22.5 (57) | 43.0 (109) |
| Average precipitation days (≥ 0.01 in) | 11.5 | 11.8 | 9.8 | 9.7 | 8.0 | 5.9 | 10.4 | 12.0 | 9.5 | 7.8 | 8.9 | 11.2 | 116.5 |
| Average snowy days (≥ 0.1 in) | 11.7 | 11.7 | 9.7 | 8.3 | 3.3 | 0.2 | 0.0 | 0.0 | 0.5 | 3.9 | 8.5 | 11.3 | 69.1 |
Source: NOAA

== Demographics ==
Historical population
| Census | Pop. | Note | %± |
|---|---|---|---|
| 1890 | 857 | | — |
| 1900 | 988 | | 15.3% |
| 1910 | 904 | | −8.5% |
| 1920 | 1,213 | | 34.2% |
| 1930 | 1,251 | | 3.1% |
| 1940 | 1,145 | | −8.5% |
| 1950 | 730 | | −36.2% |
| 1960 | 289 | | −60.4% |
| 1970 | 372 | | 28.7% |
| 1980 | 959 | | 157.8% |
| 1990 | 878 | | −8.4% |
| 2000 | 1,529 | | 74.1% |
| 2010 | 1,487 | | −2.7% |
| 2020 | 1,639 | | 10.2% |
U.S. Decennial Census

=== 2020 census ===
As of the 2020 census, Crested Butte had a population of 1,639. The median age was 39.5 years. 15.9% of residents were under the age of 18 and 10.5% of residents were 65 years of age or older. For every 100 females there were 106.4 males, and for every 100 females age 18 and over there were 103.8 males age 18 and over.

0.0% of residents lived in urban areas, while 100.0% lived in rural areas.

There were 771 households in Crested Butte, of which 22.2% had children under the age of 18 living in them. Of all households, 34.5% were married-couple households, 25.9% were households with a male householder and no spouse or partner present, and 25.6% were households with a female householder and no spouse or partner present. About 34.2% of all households were made up of individuals and 8.9% had someone living alone who was 65 years of age or older.

There were 1,188 housing units, of which 35.1% were vacant. The homeowner vacancy rate was 1.0% and the rental vacancy rate was 6.0%.

Racial composition as of the 2020 census
| Race | Number | Percent |
|---|---|---|
| White | 1,499 | 91.5% |
| Black or African American | 1 | 0.1% |
| American Indian and Alaska Native | 6 | 0.4% |
| Asian | 27 | 1.6% |
| Native Hawaiian and Other Pacific Islander | 2 | 0.1% |
| Some other race | 17 | 1.0% |
| Two or more races | 87 | 5.3% |
| Hispanic or Latino (of any race) | 79 | 4.8% |

=== 2000 census ===
As of the census of 2000, there were 1,529 people, 692 households, and 253 families residing in the town. The population density was 2,183.1 inhabitants per square mile (842.9/km^{2}). There were 930 housing units at an average density of 1,327.9 units per square mile (512.7 units/km^{2}). The racial makeup of the town was 97.19% White, 0.26% African American, 0.92% Native American, 0.72% Asian, 0.00% Pacific Islander, 0.46% from other races, and 0.46% from two or more races. 2.75% of the population were Hispanic or Latino of any race.

There were 692 households, out of which 19.1% had children under the age of 18 living with them, 28.9% were married couples living together, 5.1% had a female householder with no husband present, and 63.3% were non-families. 28.3% of all households were made up of individuals, and 1.4% had someone living alone who was 65 years of age or older. The average household size was 2.21 and the average family size was 2.69.

In the town, the population was spread out, with 13.5% under the age of 18, 11.5% from 18 to 24, 55.6% from 25 to 44, 17.5% from 45 to 64, and 1.9% who were 65 years of age or older. The median age was 31 years. For every 100 females, there were 124.5 males. For every 100 females age 18 and over, there were 131.9 males.

The median income for a household in the town was $41,250, and the median income for a family was $49,118. Males had a median income of $27,386 versus $23,073 for females. The per capita income for the town was $26,789. 11.4% of the population and 2.7% of families were below the poverty line. Out of the total population, 3.5% of those under the age of 18 and 0.0% of those 65 and older were living below the poverty line.

== Arts and culture ==
=== Festivals ===
Crested Butte hosts a number of festivals and parades throughout the year. These include Torchlight, New Years, Winter Carnival, Butte Bash College Ski Week and Mardi Gras during the winter months; Extreme Board Fest, Slushuck and Flauschink during spring; the Crested Butte Bike Week, Crested Butte Music Festival, Crested Butte International Film Festival, 4th of July, the Crested Butte Wildflower Festival, Alpenglow Concert Series, Festival of the Arts and Ball Bash during summer; and Fall Fest, Vinotok and Paragon Peoples' Fair during fall.

== Parks and recreation ==
The town of Crested Butte has a Nordic Center which has an ice skating rink as well as cross-country skiing trails. The town also has several parks, including Rainbow Park in the western section of town. Several hiking trails also exist, managed by the Crested Butte Land Trust.

The Mountain Bike Hall of Fame was located in Crested Butte before moving in 2014 to Fairfax, California.

== Media ==
Movies filmed in Crested Butte include Snowball Express (1972), Snowbeast (1977), The Further Adventures of the Wilderness Family (1978), and Ink (2009), Aliens vs. Predator: Requiem (2007).

== Infrastructure ==
Crested Butte is served by the Gunnison–Crested Butte Regional Airport in Gunnison. The town runs a free bus service connecting the town of Crested Butte with the ski resort located northeast of town. Additionally, buses connect the town to Gunnison. The town government is currently pursuing a transit and infrastructure strategy to "de-emphasize cars and focusing on walking, biking, rolling and transit".

Since the 1970s, several companies have attempted to mine molybdenum on Mount Emmons (called the "Red Lady") near Crested Butte. In 1977, W Mitchell was elected mayor of Crested Butte and led a campaign which stopped AMAX (now Freeport-McMoRan) from building a billion-dollar molybdenum mine on Mount Emmons. Because of his battle against the anticipated environmental impact, Mitchell is known as the man who "saved a mountain". The same year, 1977, saw the formation of the High Country Citizens' Alliance (HCCA), an environmental organization dedicated to protecting natural resources within the Upper Gunnison River Valley.

Currently the rights for Mount Emmons molybdenum are owned by U.S. Energy Corp. On April 25, 2011, Thomson Creek Metals announced that it had terminated its option agreement with U.S. Energy Corp. to acquire an interest in the Mount Emmons molybdenum project. Although US Energy continued to maintain its commitment to moving the project forward on its own behalf, the withdrawal of Thomson Creek Metals was heralded as a major victory in the town of Crested Butte in its battle against the proposed molybdenum mine.

== See also ==
- Crested Butte
- Crested Butte Film Festival
- Crested Butte Mountain Resort
