= Gunnison National Forest =

National forest in Colorado, United States

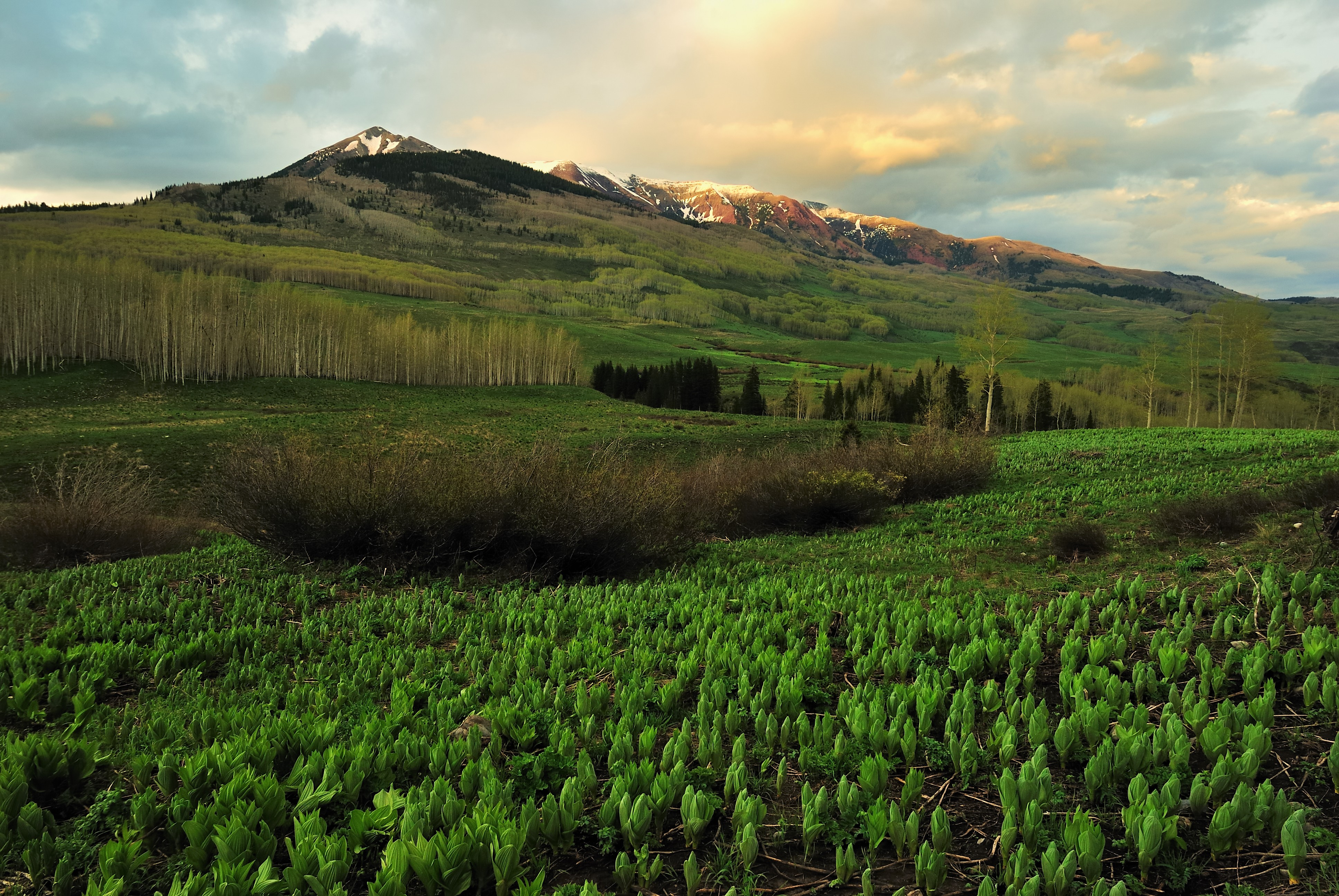
- Copper Lake Trail, near Crested Butte in Gunnison National Forest

- Location within the United States
- Location: Colorado, United States
- Nearest city: Gunnison, CO
- Coordinates: 38.703237°N 107.216700°W
- Area: 1,672,136 acres (6,766.89 km^{2})
- Established: June 13, 1905
- Governing body: U.S. Forest Service
- Website: Grand Mesa Uncompahgre and Gunnison National Forests

The Gunnison National Forest is a U.S. national forest covering 1,672,136 acres (2,612.71 sq mi, or 6,766.89 km^{2}) in Mesa, Gunnison, Hinsdale and Saguache Counties in Western part of the U.S. state of Colorado. It borders the White River National Forest to the north, the Grand Mesa and Uncompahgre National Forests to the west, the San Isabel National Forest to the east and the Rio Grande National Forest to south. It lies in parts of five counties. In descending order of land area within the forest they are Gunnison, Saguache, Hinsdale, Delta, and Montrose counties.

It shares the Maroon Bells-Snowmass Wilderness with the White River and San Isabel National Forests, and the Collegiate Peaks Wilderness Area with the San Isabel National Forest.

The forest was created by Theodore Roosevelt on June 13, 1905 as the Cochetopa Forest Reserve, and named after explorer John W. Gunnison. Today it is administered jointly with the Grand Mesa and Uncompahgre National Forests from offices in Delta. There are local ranger district offices located in Gunnison and Paonia.

== Wilderness areas ==
There are seven officially designated wilderness areas lying within Gunnison National Forest that are part of the National Wilderness Preservation System. Five of them lie partially in neighboring National Forests or on land under the jurisdiction of the Bureau of Land Management (as indicated).

- Collegiate Peaks Wilderness (the largest part in San Isabel NF; partly in White River NF)
- Fossil Ridge Wilderness
- La Garita Wilderness (partly in Rio Grande NF)
- Maroon Bells–Snowmass Wilderness (mostly in White River NF)
- Powderhorn Wilderness (mostly on BLM land)
- Raggeds Wilderness (partly in White River NF)
- West Elk Wilderness
- Uncompahgre Wilderness (partly in Uncompahgre NF)

== See also ==
- List of national forests of the United States
