= Tomichi Creek =

River in Gunnison County, Colorado, US

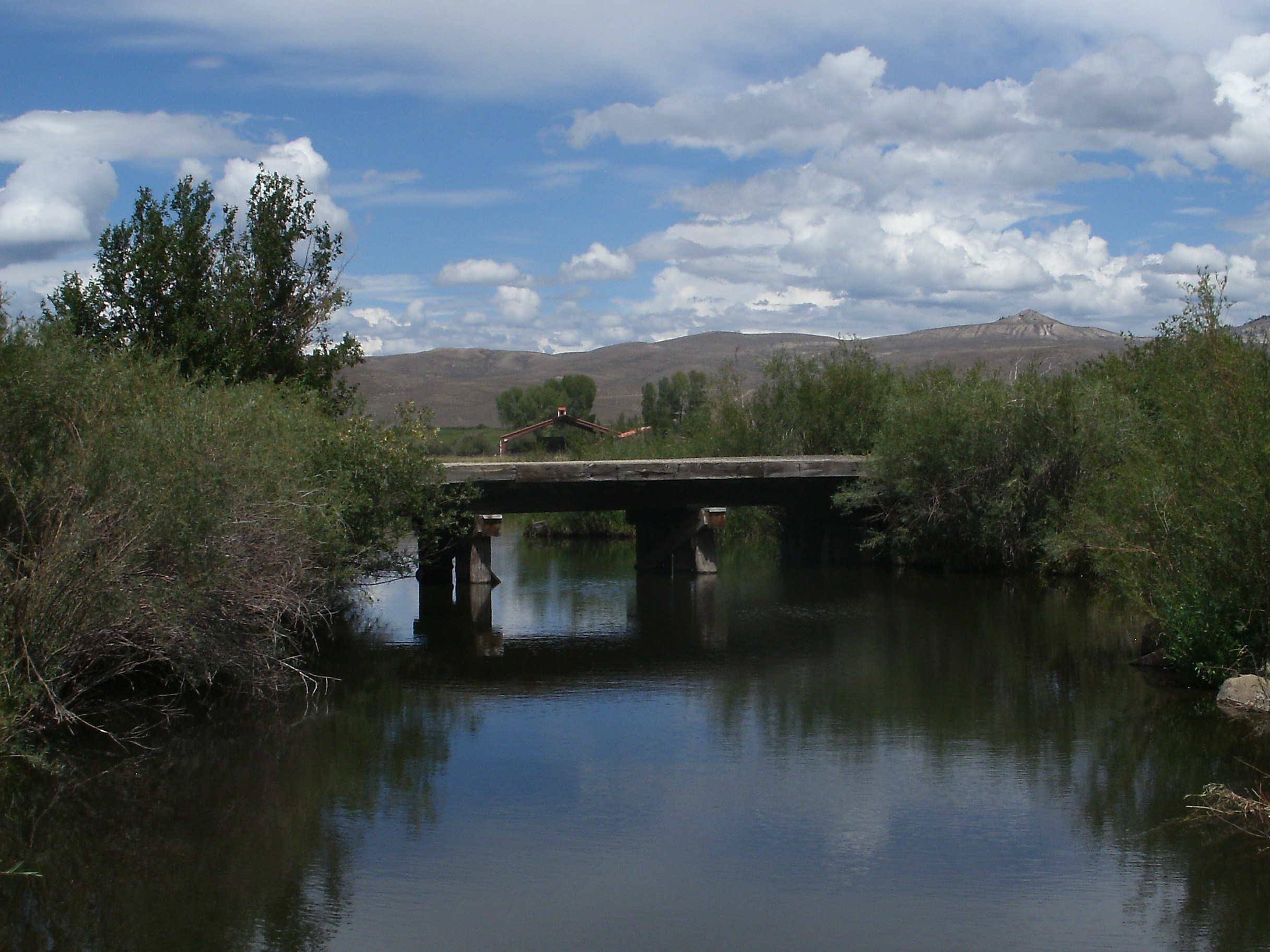
- Bridge over Tomichi Creek on the I Bar Ranch property, July 2012

Physical characteristics
- Source
  - coordinates: 38°36′06″N 106°23′02″W
- Mouth
  - location: Gunnison River
  - coordinates: 38°31′03″N 106°58′08″W
  - elevation: 7,618 ft (2,322 m)

Basin features
- Progression: Gunnison—Colorado

Tomichi Creek (Note: Pronounced /toʊˈmiːtʃiː/.) is a 71.8-mile-long (115.6 km) tributary of the Gunnison River in Gunnison County, Colorado, United States.

== Description ==
Tomichi Creek originates north and west of Monarch Pass and flows to the southwest along the base of Monarch Mountain. Congress Creek drains into Tomichi west of Old Monarch Pass where it flows south toward Sargents. Agate Creek flows into Tomichi just north of Sargents where Marshall Creek flows from Marshall Pass. Just below Sargents, Long Branch Creek, flowing out of Baldy Lake from the south, enters Tomichi Creek which takes a westward course where Needle Creek Reservoir drains into Tomichi east of Doyleville. Hot Springs Reservoir drains down Wanita Canyon flowing into Tomichi Creek just west of Doyleville. The Tomichi Valley is a semi-wide valley allowing Tomichi Creek to meander and split into several waterways creating an excellent livestock range and being largely private ranch lands. At Parlin, Quartz Creek flows from Pitkin and Ohio into Tomichi Creek. Tomichi continues its westward journey, slightly northwest, where the Cochetopa Creek drains into Tomichi at State Highway 114 (SH 114) from the south at the intersection of U.S. Route 50 (US 50) and continues west to Gunnison, where it enters the Gunnison River.

== Public access ==
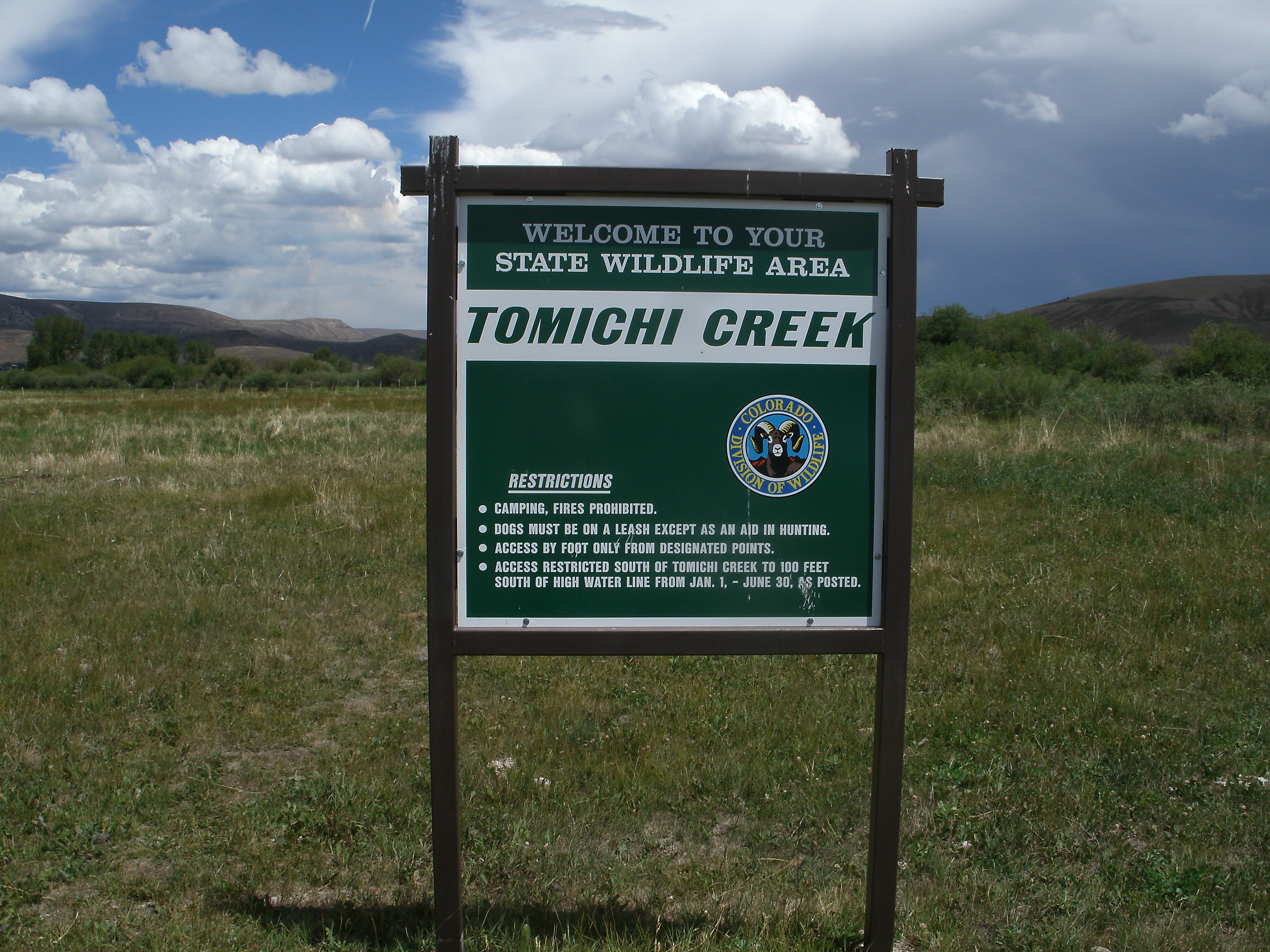
Sign at parking lot to Tomichi Creek State Wildlife Area

=== Tomichi Creek State Wildlife Area ===
Tomichi Creek State Wildlife Area is a gated public access with parking located at the east end of the runway at Gunnison-Crested Butte Regional Airport. This area provides fishing on private lands without required permission. Access to hiking W Mountain is also provided.

=== Sargents ===
Tomichi flows through private property with a one-mile stretch of public access just off US 50 below Sargents at the narrow part of the canyon. Snowblind Campground, upstream nearly two miles toward Whitepine, offers another public access to Tomichi Creek. There are certain sections of Marshall Pass Road that takes off from US 50 at Sargents which offers public fishing areas and access to Needle Creek Reservoir and Razor Creek takes off from US 50 near Doyleville onto County Road 46. There are several picnic areas with parking on the Cochetopa Creek along State Hwy 114 around mile mark 12 and 5 miles upstream. Beyond that signs designate state stocked waters and requires permission to fish. In late summer the creek yields rainbow and brown trout.

=== Coleman easement ===
Near the summit of SH 114 a sign reads National Forest Access - Old Agency, turning south on this gravel road accesses Cochetopa Creek and the middle of Colorado Parks and Wildlife's Coleman Easement, approximately 5 miles (8.0 km) of Cochetopa Creek, 2 miles (3.2 km) of Los Pinos Creek and one-half mile (0.80 km) of lower Archuleta Creek are open to the public, yet are private lands which should be respected. These streams have produced wild trout for the avid angler. Located below Dome Lakes, Coleman Easement is accessible by automobile and other vehicles and designated as Wild Trout water by Colorado Parks and Wildlife. Rainbow trout up to 15 inches (38 cm) are angled by small stream tactics using dry flies. Spinners and heavy nymphs may work during high water but are troubled by the streambed vegetation. Stocked rainbows found in the private stretches require permission to fish.

== See also ==
- List of rivers of Colorado
- List of tributaries of the Colorado River
