= Quartz Creek (Gunnison County, Colorado) =

Stream in Gunnison County, Colorado, United States

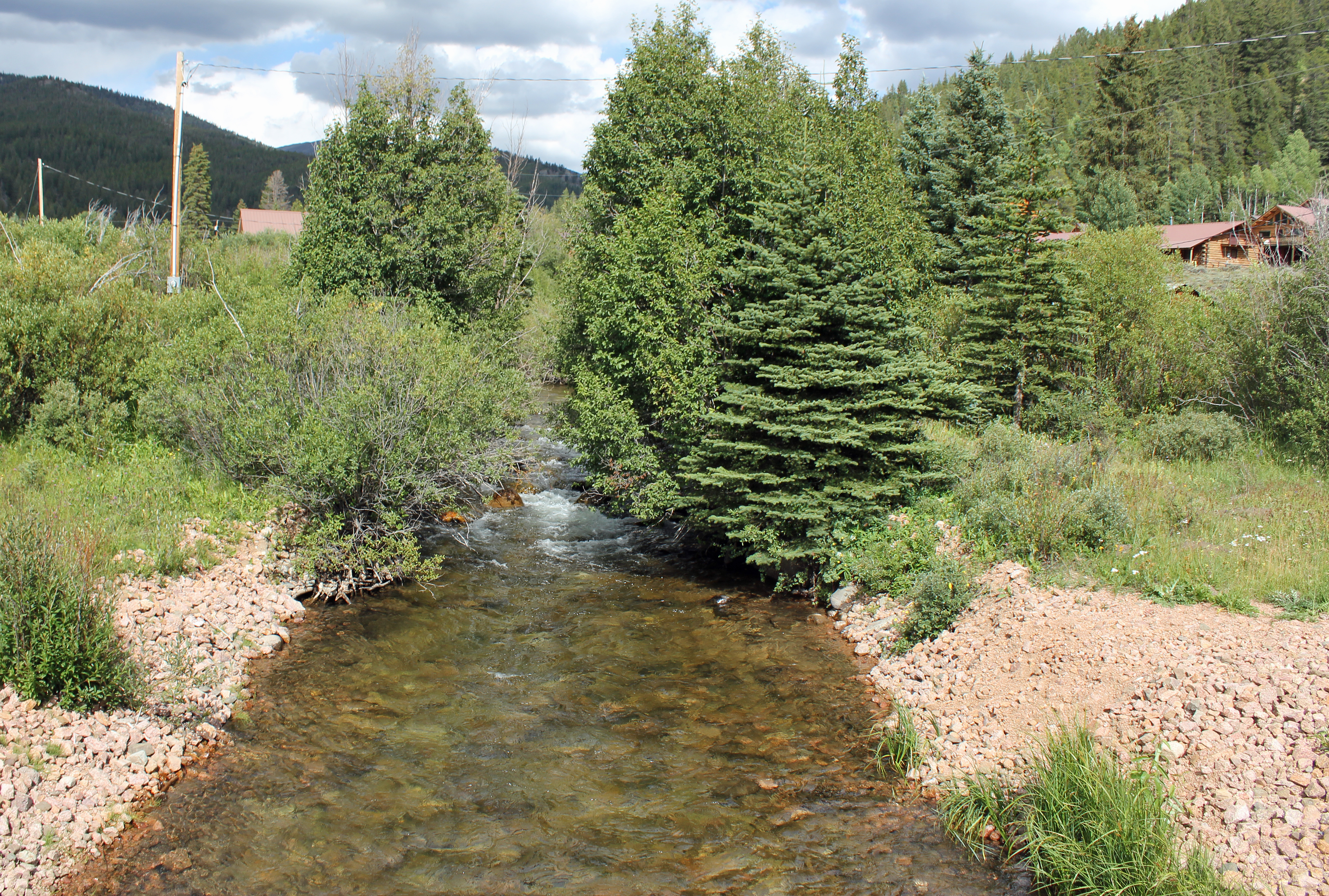
- The creek in the town of Pitkin, Colorado, August 2014

Physical characteristics
- Source
  - location: Gunnison County, Colorado
  - coordinates: 38°36′42″N 106°30′00″W
- Mouth
  - location: Tomichi Creek
  - coordinates: 38°30′03″N 106°43′44″W
  - elevation: 7,926 ft (2,416 m)

Basin features
- Progression: Tomichi—Gunnison—Colorado

Quartz Creek is a stream in Gunnison County, Colorado, United States, that is a tributary of Tomichi Creek.

== Description ==
The creek rises in the Rocky Mountains above the town of Pitkin. It empties into Tomichi Creek near the town of Parlin, along U.S. Route 50. The stream rises in the Gunnison National Forest and is formed by the merger of the North, Middle, and South Quartz creeks.

It flows through the Quartz Creek Valley and through the towns of Pitkin and Ohio City. A non-profit association, the Quartz Creek Property Owners Association, advocates for managing and preserving the Quartz Creek Valley's natural resources.

The State of Colorado operates the Pitkin Hatchery along Quartz Creek near Pitkin. The Hatchery is a cold water facility at 9,200 feet (2,800 m) elevation. Focusing on fingerling- and catchable-size rainbow and cutthroat trout and kokanee salmon, the hatchery is a brood and production facility. Ironically, most of the land along Quartz Creek in the valley is privately held, so there is little public fishing there.

== See also ==
- List of rivers of Colorado
- List of tributaries of the Colorado River
