= Henry Mountain =

Mountain in Colorado, United States

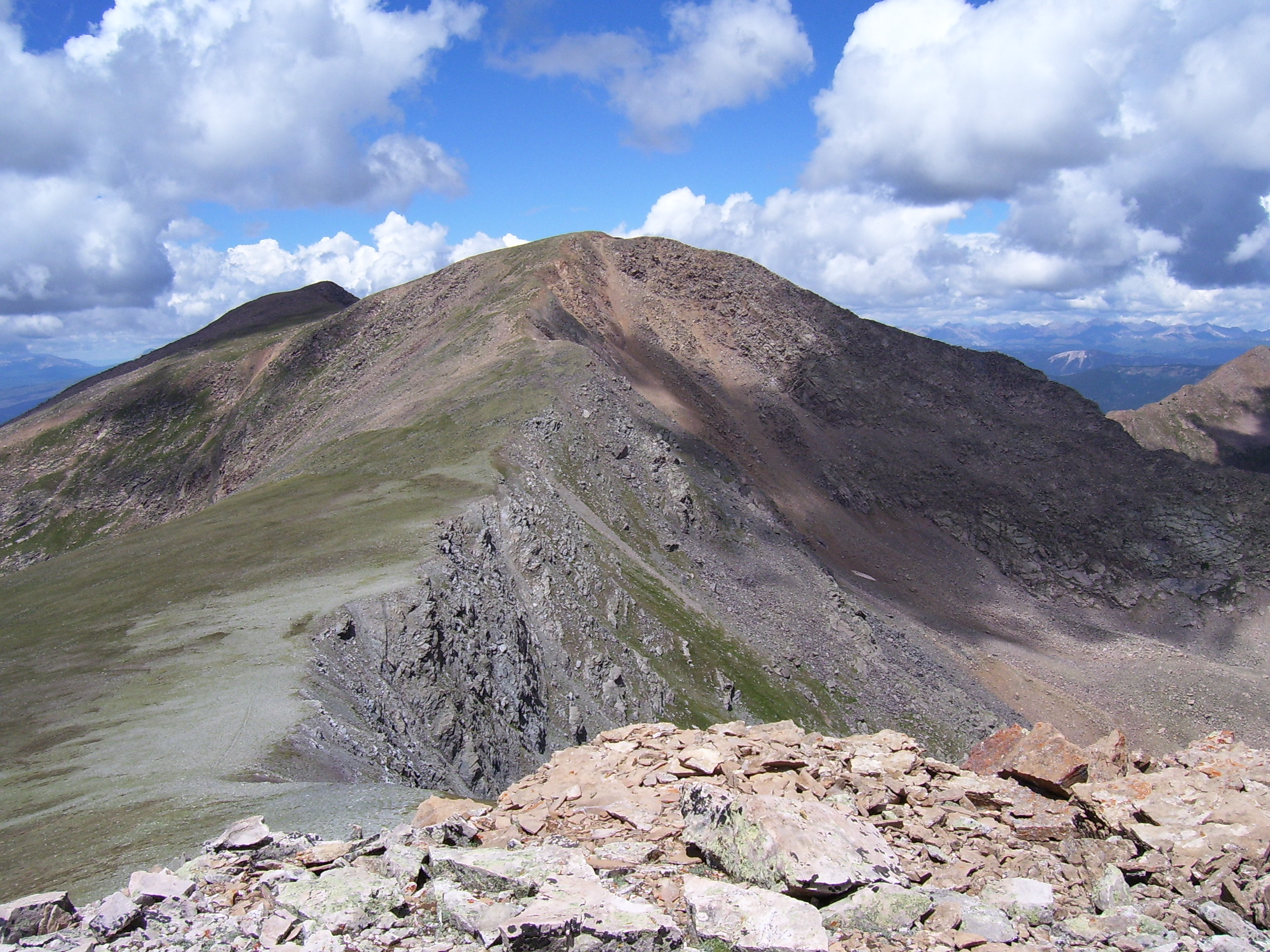
- Henry Mountain viewed from the southeast.

Highest point
- Elevation: 13,261 ft (4,042 m)
- Prominence: 1,674 ft (510 m)
- Isolation: 11.53 mi (18.56 km)
- Listing: North America highest peaks 109th; US highest major peaks 90th; Colorado highest major peaks 49th
- Coordinates: 38°41′08″N 106°37′16″W

Geography
- Location within Colorado
- Location: Gunnison County, Colorado, U.S.
- Parent range: Sawatch Range
- Topo map(s): USGS 7.5' topographic map Fairview Peak, Colorado

Henry Mountain is a high and prominent mountain summit in the southern Sawatch Range of the Rocky Mountains of North America. The 13,261-foot (4,042 m) thirteener is located in the Fossil Ridge Wilderness of Gunnison National Forest, 7.8 miles (12.5 km) northwest (bearing 313°) of the Town of Pitkin in Gunnison County, Colorado, United States.

== See also ==
- List of mountain peaks of North America
  - List of mountain peaks of the United States
    - List of mountain peaks of Colorado
