= List of tributaries of the Colorado River =

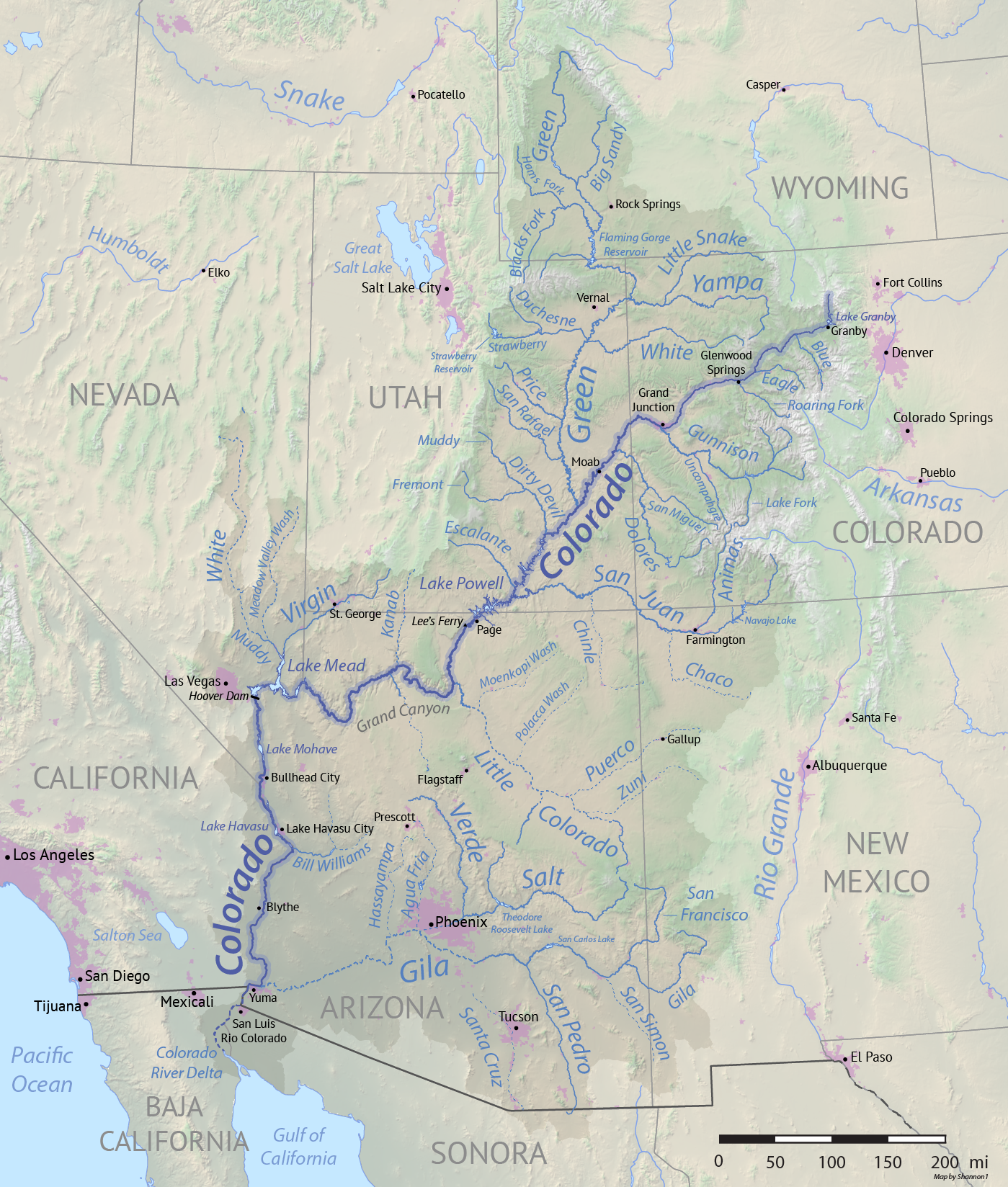
Map of the Colorado River drainage basin

The principal tributaries of the Colorado River of North America are the Gila River, the San Juan River, the Green River, and the Gunnison River.

== Tributary tree ==
The following is a tree demonstrating the points at which the major and minor tributaries of the Colorado River branch off from the main river and from each other.

- (Source-upstream)
  - Fraser River
  - Muddy Creek
  - Blue River
    - Snake River
    - Tenmile Creek
  - Piney River
  - Sweetwater Creek
  - Deep Creek
  - Eagle River
    - Gore Creek
  - Roaring Fork River
    - Fryingpan River
    - Crystal River
  - Elk Creek
  - Plateau Creek
  - Gunnison River
    - East River
      - Slate River
    - Taylor River
    - Tomichi Creek
      - Cochetopa Creek
      - Quartz Creek
    - Lake Fork Gunnison River
      - Henson Creek
    - Uncompahgre River
    - Smith Fork
    - North Fork Gunnison River
  - Little Dolores River
  - Dolores River
    - West Dolores River
    - San Miguel River
  - Green River
    - Big Sandy River
    - Blacks Fork
    - Henry's Fork
    - Sheep Creek
    - Carter Creek
    - Cart Creek
    - Crouse Creek
    - Vermillion Creek
    - Yampa River
      - Bear River
      - Elk River
      - Little Snake River
    - Jones Hole Creek
    - Duchesne River
    - White River
    - Willow River
    - Price River
      - White River
      - Range Creek
    - San Rafael River
  - Dark Canyon
  - Dirty Devil River
    - Muddy Creek
    - Fremont River
  - Escalante River
  - San Juan River
    - East Fork San Juan River
    - West Fork San Juan River
      - Wolf Creek
    - Navajo River
    - Piedra River
    - Los Pinos River
    - Animas River
      - Florida River
    - La Plata River
    - Chaco River
    - Mancos River
    - Chinle Creek
  - Paria River
  - Little Colorado River
    - Zuni River
      - Rio Nutria, tributary to the Zuni River
      - Rio Pescado, tributary to the Zuni River
    - Puerco River
  - Bright Angel Creek
  - Crystal Creek (Arizona)
  - Tapeats Creek
    - Thunder River
  - Deer Creek
  - Kanab Creek
  - Havasu Creek
  - Diamond Creek
  - Virgin River
    - Meadow Valley Wash
    - Muddy River
  - Las Vegas Wash
  - Bill Williams River
    - Santa Maria River
    - Big Sandy River
  - Gila River
    - San Francisco River
      - Tularosa River
    - San Pedro River
    - Santa Cruz River
    - Salt River
      - Black River
      - Tonto Creek
      - Verde River
        - Oak Creek
    - Agua Fria River
    - Hassayampa River
  - Hardy River

== See also ==
- Grand Canyon Rapids and Features
