= Cochetopa Creek =

Stream in Colorado, United States

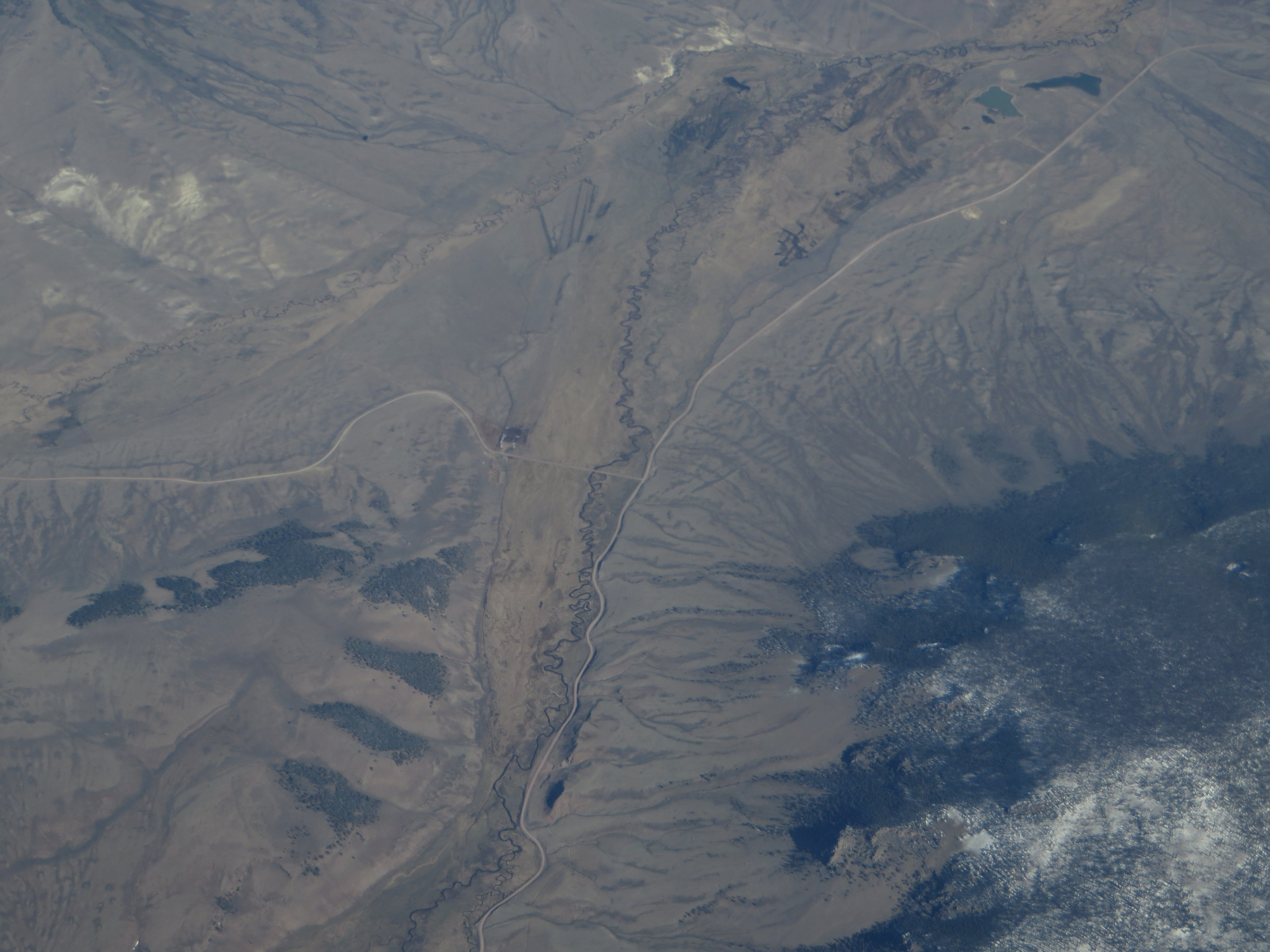
- An aerial view of the creek.

Physical characteristics
- Source
  - location: San Luis Peak in Saguache County, Colorado
  - coordinates: 37°59′15″N 106°55′32″W
- Mouth
  - location: Confluence with Tomichi Creek
  - coordinates: 38°31′10″N 106°47′20″W
  - elevation: 7,821 ft (2,384 m)

Basin features
- Progression: Tomichi—Gunnison—Colorado

Cochetopa Creek is a stream in Saguache and Gunnison counties in Colorado, United States. It rises on San Luis Peak in the La Garita Mountains. It merges with Tomichi Creek near the town of Parlin, Colorado, along Highway 50.

The creek flows through the Cochetopa Caldera in the San Juan volcanic field and through Cochetopa Canyon along Colorado State Highway 114.

== Climate ==
Climate data for Cochetopa Creek, Colorado (8006ft or 2440m), 1991–2020 normals
Month	Jan	Feb	Mar	Apr	May	Jun	Jul	Aug	Sep	Oct	Nov	Dec	Year
Mean daily maximum °F (°C)	27.5 (−2.5)	32.3 (0.2)	43.9 (6.6)	54.6 (12.6)	64.7 (18.2)	75.2 (24.0)	79.5 (26.4)	77.8 (25.4)	71.7 (22.1)	59.8 (15.4)	44.1 (6.7)	30.0 (−1.1)	55.1 (12.8)
Daily mean °F (°C)	11.6 (−11.3)	17.2 (−8.2)	28.9 (−1.7)	38.4 (3.6)	47.0 (8.3)	55.8 (13.2)	61.6 (16.4)	59.8 (15.4)	52.5 (11.4)	40.9 (4.9)	27.7 (−2.4)	14.5 (−9.7)	38.0 (3.3)
Mean daily minimum °F (°C)	−4.2 (−20.1)	2.0 (−16.7)	13.8 (−10.1)	22.2 (−5.4)	29.3 (−1.5)	36.4 (2.4)	43.6 (6.4)	41.9 (5.5)	33.3 (0.7)	22.1 (−5.5)	11.3 (−11.5)	−1.0 (−18.3)	20.9 (−6.2)
Average precipitation inches (mm)	0.72 (18)	0.67 (17)	0.65 (17)	0.90 (23)	0.97 (25)	0.63 (16)	1.35 (34)	1.52 (39)	1.13 (29)	0.72 (18)	0.58 (15)	0.80 (20)	10.64 (271)
Average snowfall inches (cm)	10.80 (27.4)	9.60 (24.4)	6.70 (17.0)	5.90 (15.0)	1.40 (3.6)	0.10 (0.25)	0.0 (0.0)	0.0 (0.0)	0.30 (0.76)	1.90 (4.8)	6.40 (16.3)	11.20 (28.4)	54.3 (137.91)
Source: NOAA

== See also ==
- List of rivers of Colorado
- List of tributaries of the Colorado River
