= Marshall Creek (Tomichi Creek) =

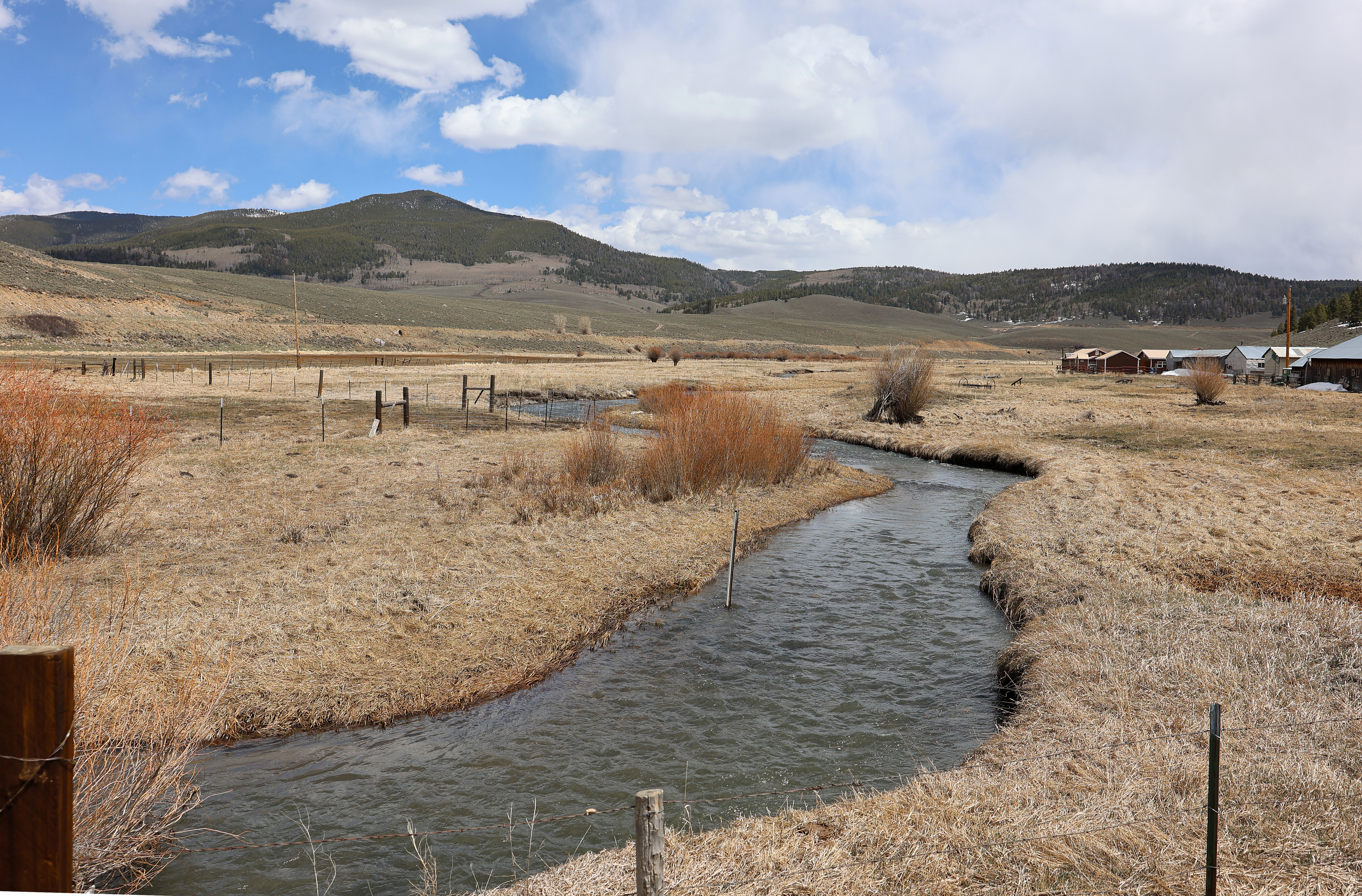
- The creek at Sargents

- Location of the creek's mouth in Colorado

Physical characteristics
- Source
  - location: Near Marshall Pass in Saguache County, Colorado
  - coordinates: 38°23′8″N 106°14′49.08″W
- Mouth
  - location: near Sargents, Colorado
  - coordinates: 38°24′11.99″N 106°25′19.10″W
  - elevation: 8,445 feet (2,574 meters)

Basin features
- Progression: Tomichi Creek→ Gunnison River→ Colorado River
- Tributaries
  - left: Millswitch Creek, Jay Creek, Duncan Creek, Tank Seven Creek, Milk Creek, Big Bend Creek
  - right: Harry Creek, Indian Creek, Nelson Creek, Carlson Creek

Marshall Creek is a tributary of Tomichi Creek in Saguache County, Colorado.

== Course ==
The creek rises near Marshall Pass in the Gunnison National Forest. From there, it flows generally westward until it reaches its confluence with Tomichi Creek at Sargents, Colorado.

== See also ==
- List of rivers of Colorado
