= West Fork San Juan River =

River in Colorado, US

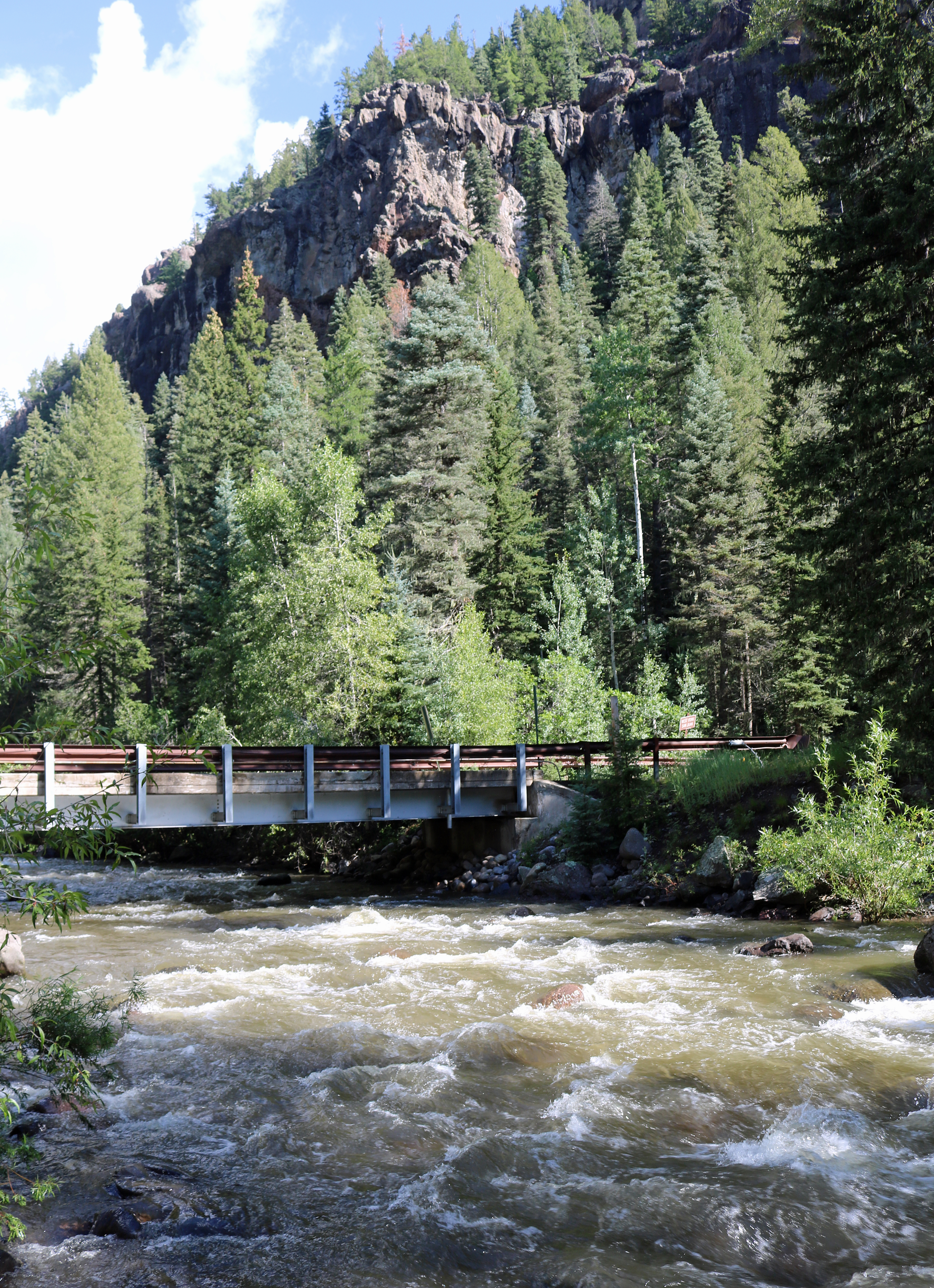
- The river at West Fork Road (Forest Road 648) near the West Fork Campground

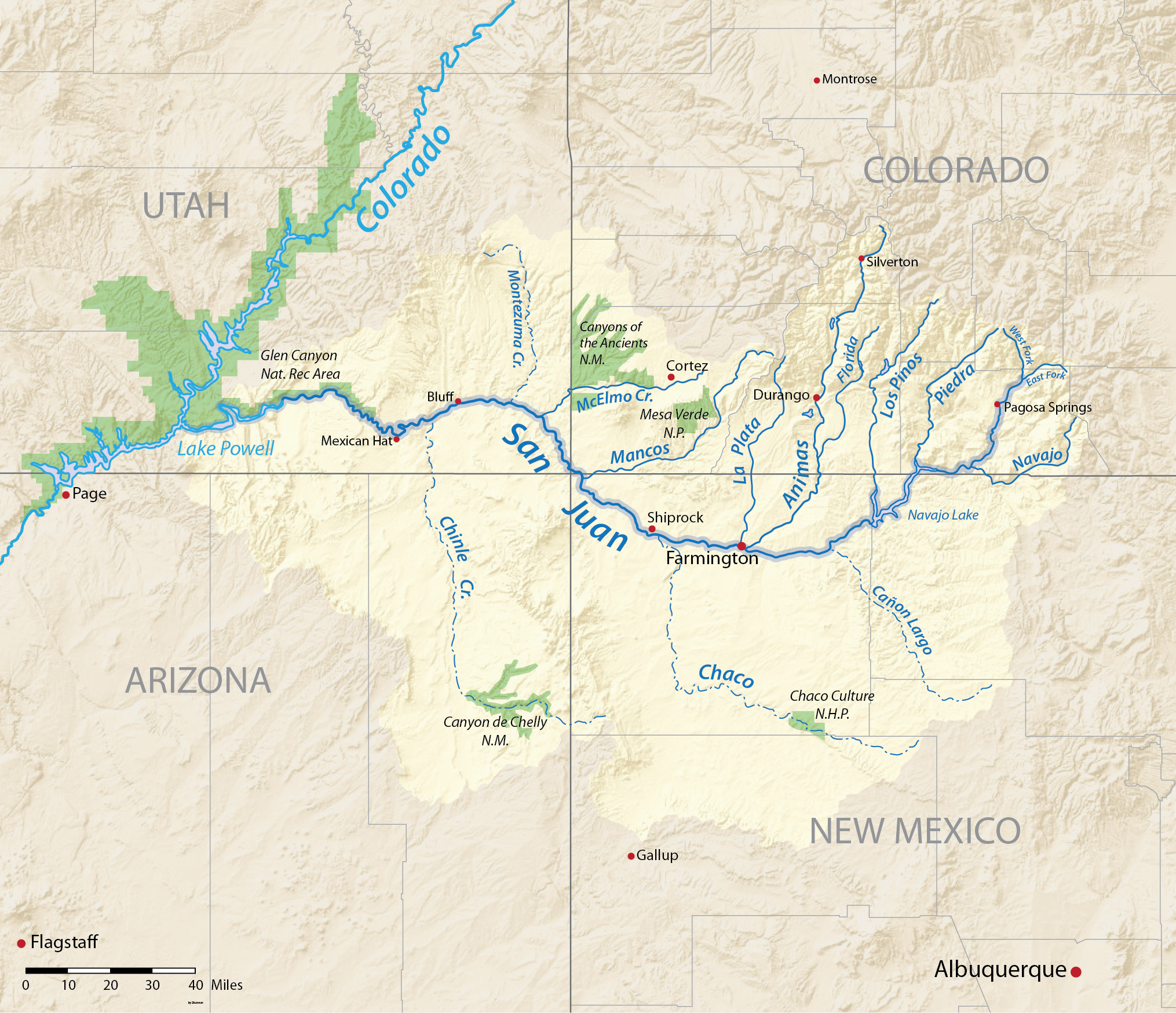
- Map of the San Juan River watershed

Physical characteristics
- Source
  - location: Mineral County, Colorado
  - coordinates: 37°34′05″N 106°58′57″W
- Mouth
  - location: Confluence with East Fork San Juan
  - coordinates: 37°21′55″N 106°54′02″W
  - elevation: 7,549 ft (2,301 m)

Basin features
- Progression: San Juan—Colorado

West Fork San Juan River is a tributary of the San Juan River in Mineral and Archuleta counties in Colorado, United States. The stream flows from a source near South River Peak in Mineral County to a confluence with the East Fork San Juan River in Archuleta County that forms the San Juan River.

== See also ==
- List of rivers of Colorado
- List of tributaries of the Colorado River
