= Fossil Ridge Wilderness =

Protected area in west-central Colorado, US

- IUCN category Ib (wilderness area)
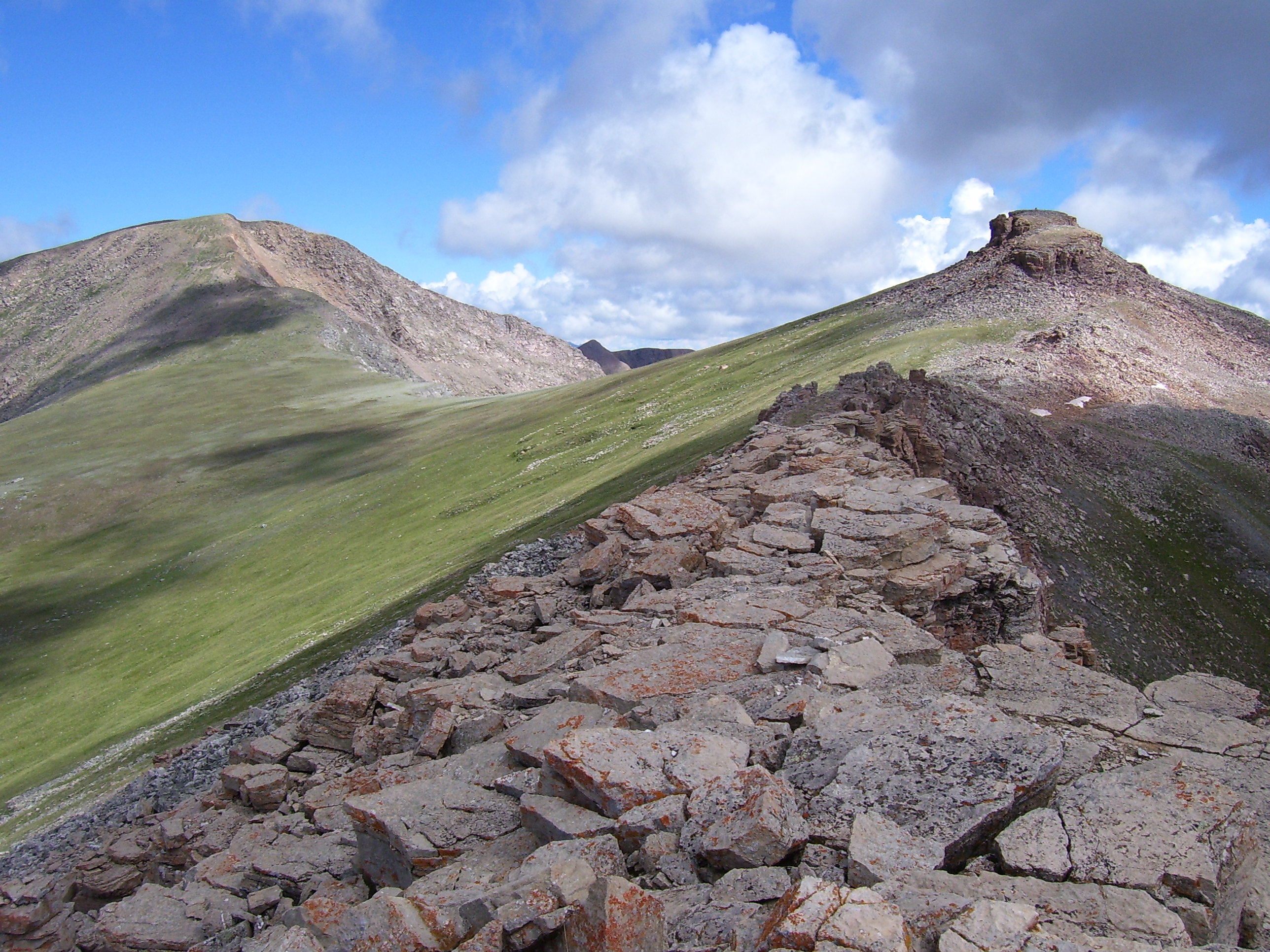
- Henry Mountain and Square Top Mountain in the Fossil Ridge Wilderness.

- Location within Colorado Location within the United States
- Location: Gunnison County, Colorado, USA
- Nearest city: Gunnison, CO
- Coordinates: 38°41′00″N 106°38′00″W
- Area: 13,992 acres (56.62 km^{2})
- Established: 1993
- Governing body: U.S. Forest Service

The Fossil Ridge Wilderness is a U.S. Wilderness Area located approximately 16 miles (26 km) northeast of Gunnison, Colorado in the Gunnison National Forest. The 13,992-acre (56.62 km^{2}) wilderness includes Fossil Ridge, a high, exposed ridge of Paleozoic carbonates that contain epeiric sea fossils. Elevations in the wilderness range from 8,880 feet (2,710 m) at Summerville Creek to 13,254 feet (4,040 m) at the summit of Henry Mountain. Elk, deer, mountain goats, and bighorn sheep can be found in the wilderness.
