= Gunnison County, Colorado =

County in Colorado, United States

- County
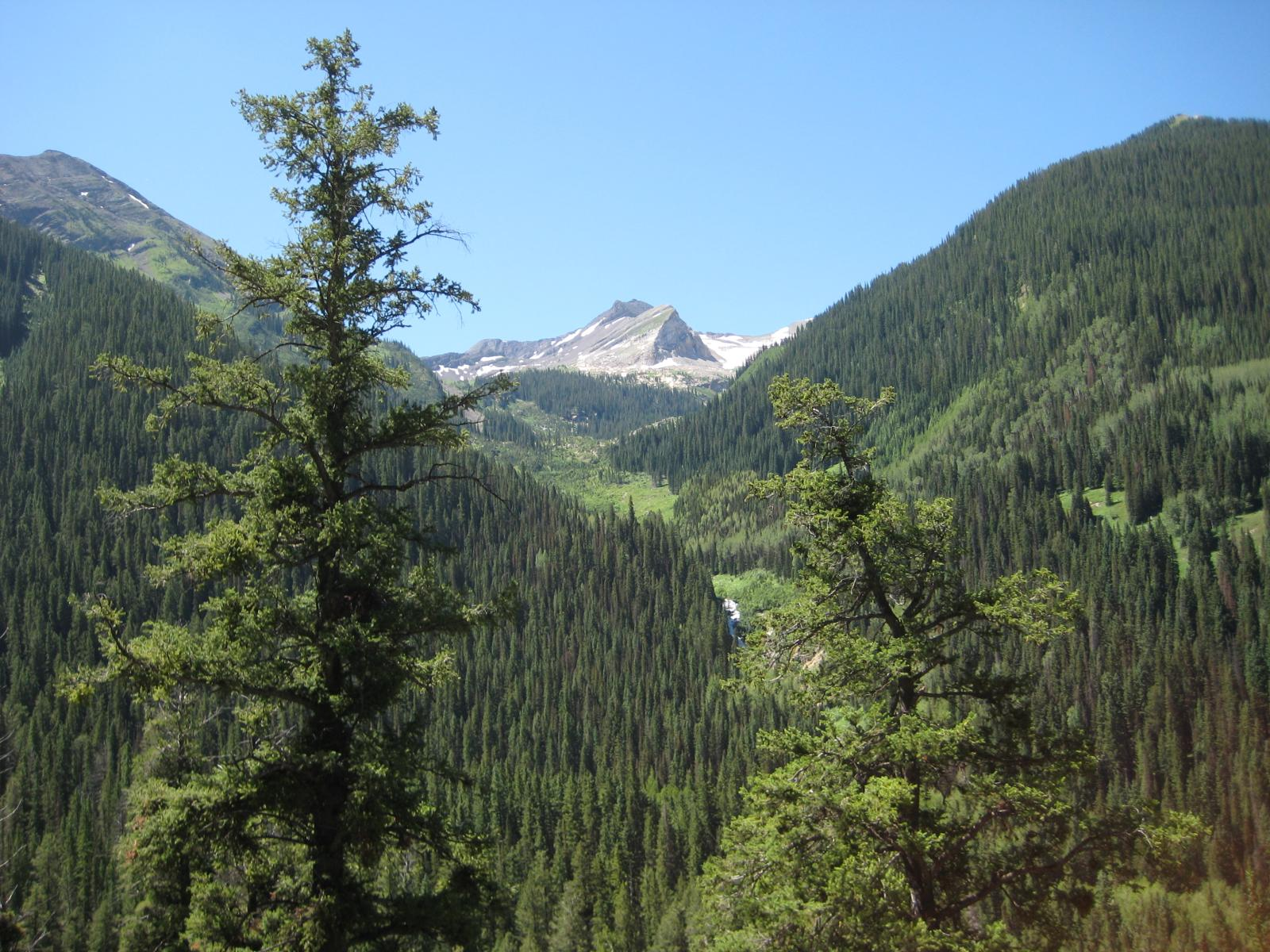
- Treasure Mountain

- Location within the U.S. state of Colorado
- Coordinates: 38.67°N 107.01°W
- Country: United States
- State: Colorado
- Founded: March 9, 1877
- Named for: John W. Gunnison
- Seat: Gunnison
- Largest city: Gunnison

Area
  - Total: 3,260 sq mi (8,400 km^{2})
  - Land: 3,239 sq mi (8,390 km^{2})
  - Water: 21 sq mi (54 km^{2}) 0.6%

Population (2020)
  - Total: 16,918
  - Estimate (2025): 17,439 ▲
  - Density: 5.223/sq mi (2.017/km^{2})
- Time zone: UTC−7 (Mountain)
  - Summer (DST): UTC−6 (MDT)
- Congressional district: 3rd
- Website: www.gunnisoncounty.org

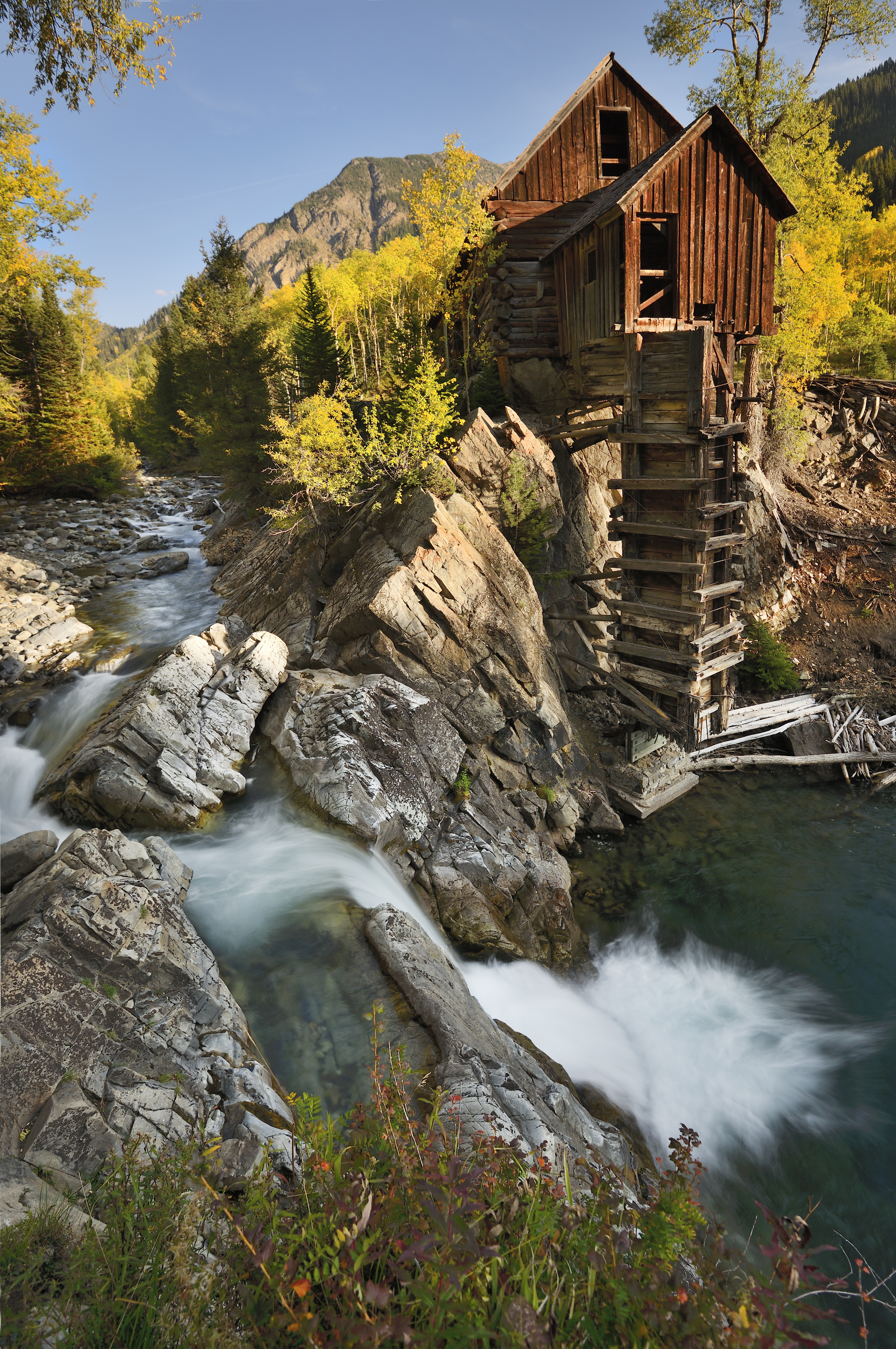
The historic Crystal Mill, built in 1893

Gunnison County is a county located in the U.S. state of Colorado. As of the 2020 census, the population was 16,918. The county seat is Gunnison. The county was named for John W. Gunnison, a United States Army officer and captain in the Army Topographical Engineers, who surveyed for the transcontinental railroad in 1853.

== History ==
Archeological studies have dated the Ute people's appearance in the Uncompahgre region of Colorado as early as 1150 A.D. Possibilities exist that they are descendants of an earlier people living in the area as far back as 1500 B.C. They were a nomadic people moving about the Western Slope of Colorado in the various parts of the year. In the early to mid-1600s the Spaniards of New Mexico introduced the horse which changed their patterns of hunting taking them across the divide to the eastern slopes and into conflict with the Plains Indians which soon became their bitter enemies.

The first recorded expedition of Western Colorado wilderness was led by Don Juan Rivera in 1765. In 1776, two Spanish priests, Fathers Escalante and Domínguez, led a party into the area around Montrose and Paonia.

The 1830s brought the mountainmen into the area to trap beaver. An old cabin located on Cochetopa Creek discovered by Sidney Jocknick was most likely built between 1830 and 1840 and a crude fort was discovered on a tributary of Tomichi Creek bore signs of a conflict.

In 1853, Capt. John W. Gunnison surveyed the area for the transcontinental railroad route.

In 1858, gold was discovered near Denver bringing the white man across the divide into the western slope in search of the precious metal. In 1859 a party settled on Texas Gulch in Union Park.

Placer gold was found at Washington Gulch in 1861 as part of the Colorado Gold Rush.

In 1861, the Territory of Colorado was organized. The territorial governor was made ex officio Superintentant of Indian Affairs. A conference on October 1, 1863, established a boundary line for a reservation. This treaty averted a possible dangerous situation by giving the Utes some cattle and sheep, a blacksmith and 20,000 dollars a year in goods and provisions. The government failed to fulfill any these obligations straining the relations further. The treaty of 1868 recognized Chief Ouray as the sole spokesman for seven tribes of the Ute People. He held this power over his people through diplomacy and understanding.

The Los Pinos Agency was developed through the Treaties of 1868 and 1873. The first agent was 2nd Lieutenant Calvin T. Speer. In 1871, a cow camp was started near the present site of Gunnison with James P. Kelley in charge. In this year, Jabez Nelson Trask, a Harvard grad, relieved Speer as agent upon orders from Governor Edward M. McCook. In 1872 Trask was replaced by Charles Adams.

In 1875, orders from Washington to move the agency to the Uncompahgre Valley were completed in November.

In 1876, Colorado entered the Union and Gunnison County was formed. 1879 was a year of expansion due to the miners, speculators and adventurers seeking wealth. The cattle industry was established by 1880. The short growing season was not conducive to farming and the ranchers had to level fields and construct irrigation ditches to water the fields for hay.

== Geography ==
According to the U.S. Census Bureau, the county has a total area of 3,260 square miles (8,400 km^{2}), of which 3,239 square miles (8,390 km^{2}) is land and 21 square miles (54 km^{2}) (0.6%) is water. It is the fifth-largest county by area in Colorado. The county seat is Gunnison, Colorado which is located in a wide valley at the confluence of Tomichi Creek and Gunnison River. The county rests in the Gunnison Basin formed by the Continental Divide to the east, Collegiate Peaks Wilderness rises in the northeast, Maroon Bells–Snowmass Wilderness and the White River National Forest to the north, the West Elk Wilderness rises in the west of the county with Delta and Montrose Counties on its western slopes. The Uncompahgre Wilderness rises in the southwest of the county and the Powderhorn Wilderness east of there and Saquache County being south of Gunnison county eastward over to Marshall Pass southeast of the county.

Taylor Park Reservoir is a man-made lake created by the Taylor Dam constructed in 1934 with appropriations of 2,725,000 dollars.

=== Adjacent counties ===
- Pitkin County, Colorado — north
- Chaffee County, Colorado — east
- Saguache County, Colorado — southeast
- Hinsdale County, Colorado — south
- Ouray County, Colorado — southwest
- Delta County, Colorado — west
- Montrose County, Colorado — west
- Mesa County, Colorado — northwest

=== Major highways ===
- U.S. Highway 50
- State Highway 92
- State Highway 114
- State Highway 133
- State Highway 135
- State Highway 149

== Demographics ==
Historical population
Census	Pop.	Note	%±
1880	8,235		—
1890	4,359		−47.1%
1900	5,331		22.3%
1910	5,897		10.6%
1920	5,590		−5.2%
1930	5,527		−1.1%
1940	6,192		12.0%
1950	5,716		−7.7%
1960	5,477		−4.2%
1970	7,578		38.4%
1980	10,689		41.1%
1990	10,273		−3.9%
2000	13,956		35.9%
2010	15,324		9.8%
2020	16,918		10.4%
2025 (est.)	17,439	▲	3.1%
U.S. Decennial Census; 1790-1960 1900-1990; 1990-2000 2010-2020

=== 2020 census ===
As of the 2020 census, the county had a population of 16,918. Of the residents, 17.1% were under the age of 18 and 14.8% were 65 years of age or older; the median age was 37.3 years. For every 100 females there were 113.9 males, and for every 100 females age 18 and over there were 114.4 males. 42.7% of residents lived in urban areas and 57.3% lived in rural areas.

Gunnison County, Colorado – Racial and ethnic composition Note: the US Census treats Hispanic/Latino as an ethnic category. This table excludes Latinos from the racial categories and assigns them to a separate category. Hispanics/Latinos may be of any race.
Race / Ethnicity (NH = Non-Hispanic)	Pop 2000	Pop 2010	Pop 2020	% 2000	% 2010	% 2020
White alone (NH)	12,886	13,658	14,254	92.33%	89.13%	84.25%
Black or African American alone (NH)	55	45	77	0.39%	0.29%	0.46%
Native American or Alaska Native alone (NH)	78	61	70	0.56%	0.40%	0.41%
Asian alone (NH)	71	94	121	0.51%	0.61%	0.72%
Pacific Islander alone (NH)	3	4	7	0.02%	0.03%	0.04%
Other race alone (NH)	13	13	111	0.09%	0.08%	0.66%
Mixed race or Multiracial (NH)	150	194	674	1.07%	1.27%	3.98%
Hispanic or Latino (any race)	700	1,255	1,604	5.02%	8.19%	9.48%
Total	13,956	15,324	16,918	100.00%	100.00%	100.00%

The racial makeup of the county was 86.6% White, 0.5% Black or African American, 1.2% American Indian and Alaska Native, 0.7% Asian, 0.0% Native Hawaiian and Pacific Islander, 4.0% from some other race, and 6.9% from two or more races. Hispanic or Latino residents of any race comprised 9.5% of the population.

There were 7,135 households in the county, of which 23.9% had children under the age of 18 living with them and 19.9% had a female householder with no spouse or partner present. About 30.4% of all households were made up of individuals and 9.2% had someone living alone who was 65 years of age or older.

There were 12,131 housing units, of which 41.2% were vacant. Among occupied housing units, 62.5% were owner-occupied and 37.5% were renter-occupied. The homeowner vacancy rate was 1.7% and the rental vacancy rate was 7.3%.

=== 2010 census ===
As of the 2010 census, the total population for Gunnison County was 15,324, with 8,306 males and 7,018 females. The median age was 35.7 years old. Of the races, 14,152 were white, 92.4 percent; 1,255 were Hispanic or Latino (of any race), 8.2 percent; 510 claimed other race, 3.3 percent; 208 were American Indian and Alaska Native, 1.4 percent; 100 were Asian, 0.7 percent.

Total households were 6,516, 100.0 percent; Family households (families) 3,454, 53.0 percent, ("Family households" were based on a householder and one or more other people related to the householder by birth, marriage, or adoption. Same-sex married couples were not included.)

Occupied housing units consisted of 6,516 units, being 100.0 percent, with 3,900 or 59.9 percent being owner-occupied housing units; 2,616 or 40.1 percent being renters.

There were estimated 9,155 employed persons and 459 unemployed. 4,601 people drove to work alone and 1,027 car-pooled; 1,297 people walked to work and 1,052 took other means. Management, business, science, and arts occupations included 2,895 persons; Service occupations included 1,828 persons; Sales and office occupations included 2,192 persons; Natural resources, construction, and maintenance occupations included 1,635 persons; Production, transportation, and material moving occupations included 605 persons. 6,635 people were private wage and salary workers; 1,865 people were government workers; 655 people were self-employed and 49,356 dollars was the median household income and 67,333 dollars was the mean household income.

=== 2000 census ===
As of the 2000 census, there were 13,956 people, 5,649 households, and 2,965 families residing in the county. The population density was 4 people per square mile (1.5 people/km^{2}). There were 9,135 housing units at an average density of 3 units per square mile (1.2 units/km^{2}). The racial makeup of the county was 95.08% White, 0.49% Black or African American, 0.70% Native American, 0.54% Asian, 0.04% Pacific Islander, 1.44% from other races, and 1.72% from two or more races. 5.02% of the population were Hispanic or Latino of any race.

There were 5,649 households, out of which 24.10% had children under the age of 18 living with them, 44.20% were married couples living together, 5.40% had a female householder with no husband present, and 47.50% were non-families. 27.20% of all households were made up of individuals, and 4.60% had someone living alone who was 65 years of age or older. The average household size was 2.30 and the average family size was 2.84.

In the county, the age demographic is distributed, with 17.90% under the age of 18, 21.10% from 18 to 24, 32.90% from 25 to 44, 21.20% from 45 to 64, and 6.90% who were 65 years of age or older. The median age was 30 years. For every 100 females there were 118.30 males. For every 100 females age 18 and over, there were 120.90 males.

The median income for a household in the county was $36,916, and the median income for a family was $51,950. Males had a median income of $30,885 versus $25,000 for females. The per capita income for the county was $21,407. About 6.00% of families and 15.00% of the population were below the poverty line, including 9.40% of those under age 18 and 7.20% of those age 65 or over.

== Education ==
=== K-12 Education ===
Gunnison County is served by Gunnison Watershed School District RE-1J, which operates schools in Gunnison, Crested Butte, and Marble.

=== Higher Education ===
Notably, Gunnison County is home to Western Colorado University, located in the city of Gunnison. WCU is a public four-year university with an enrollment of roughly 3,500 students in the 2022-2023 academic year.

== Recreation ==
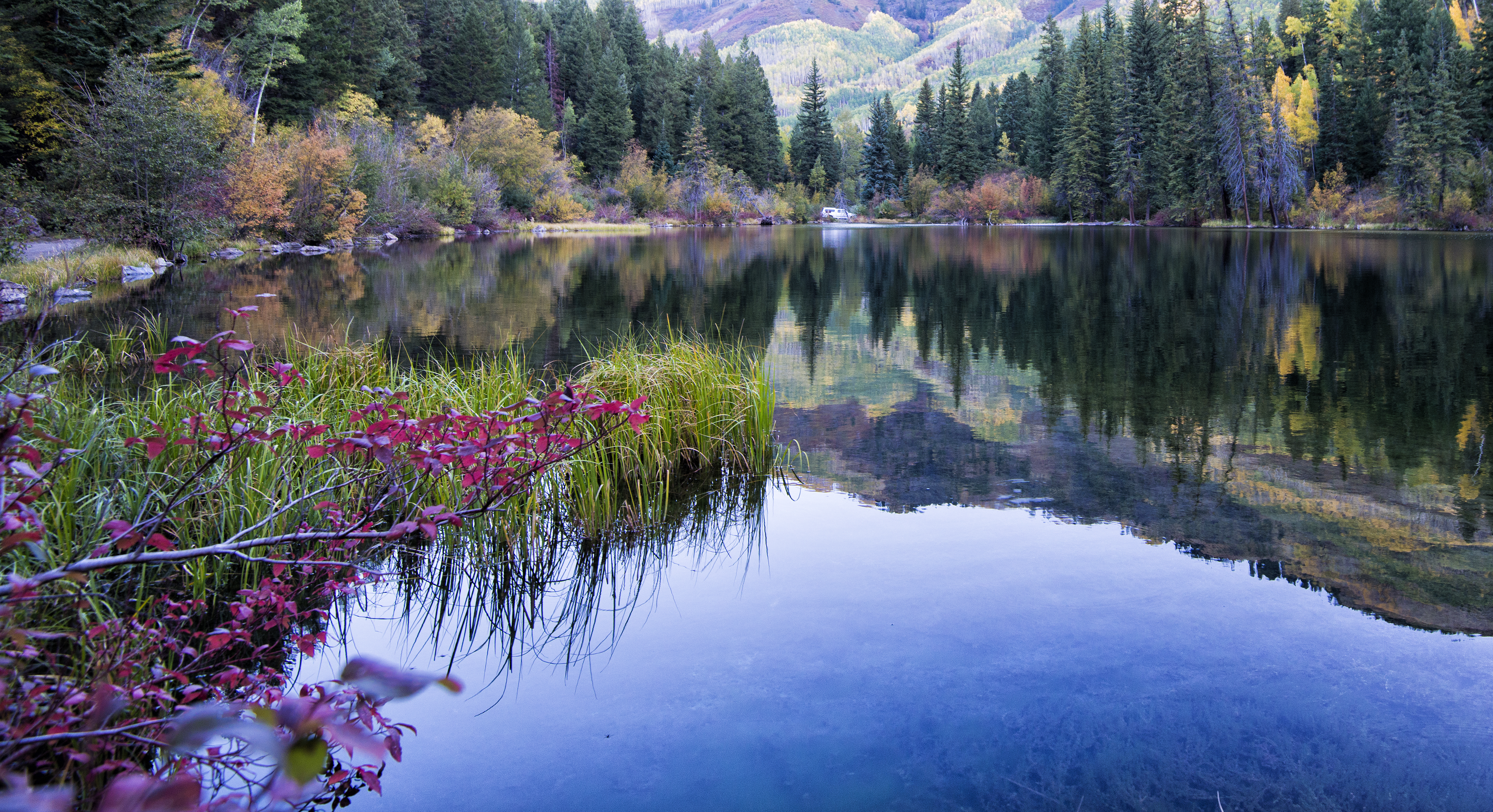
Lizard Lake, in the White River National Forest east of Marble, Colorado

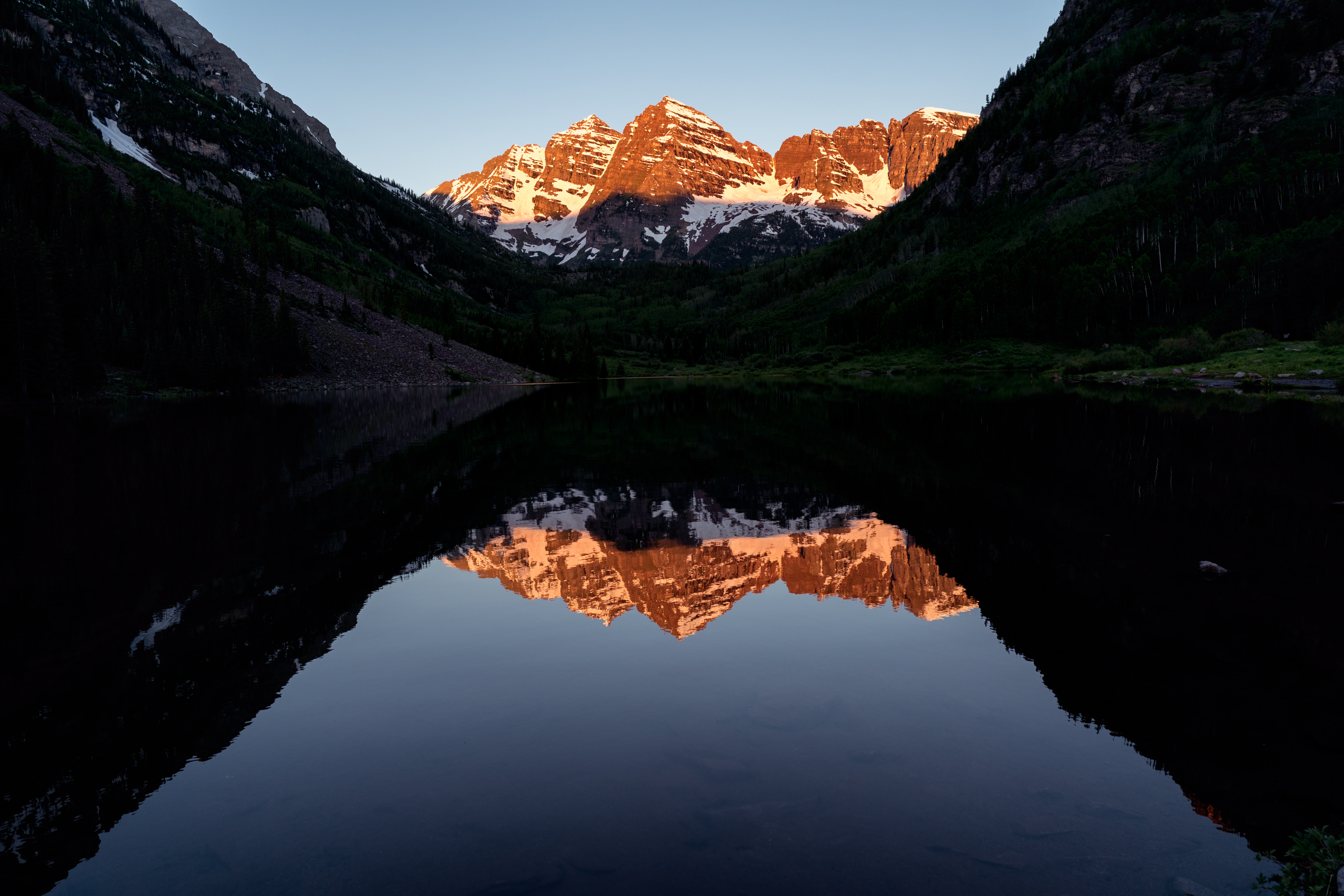
Maroon Bells at sunrise

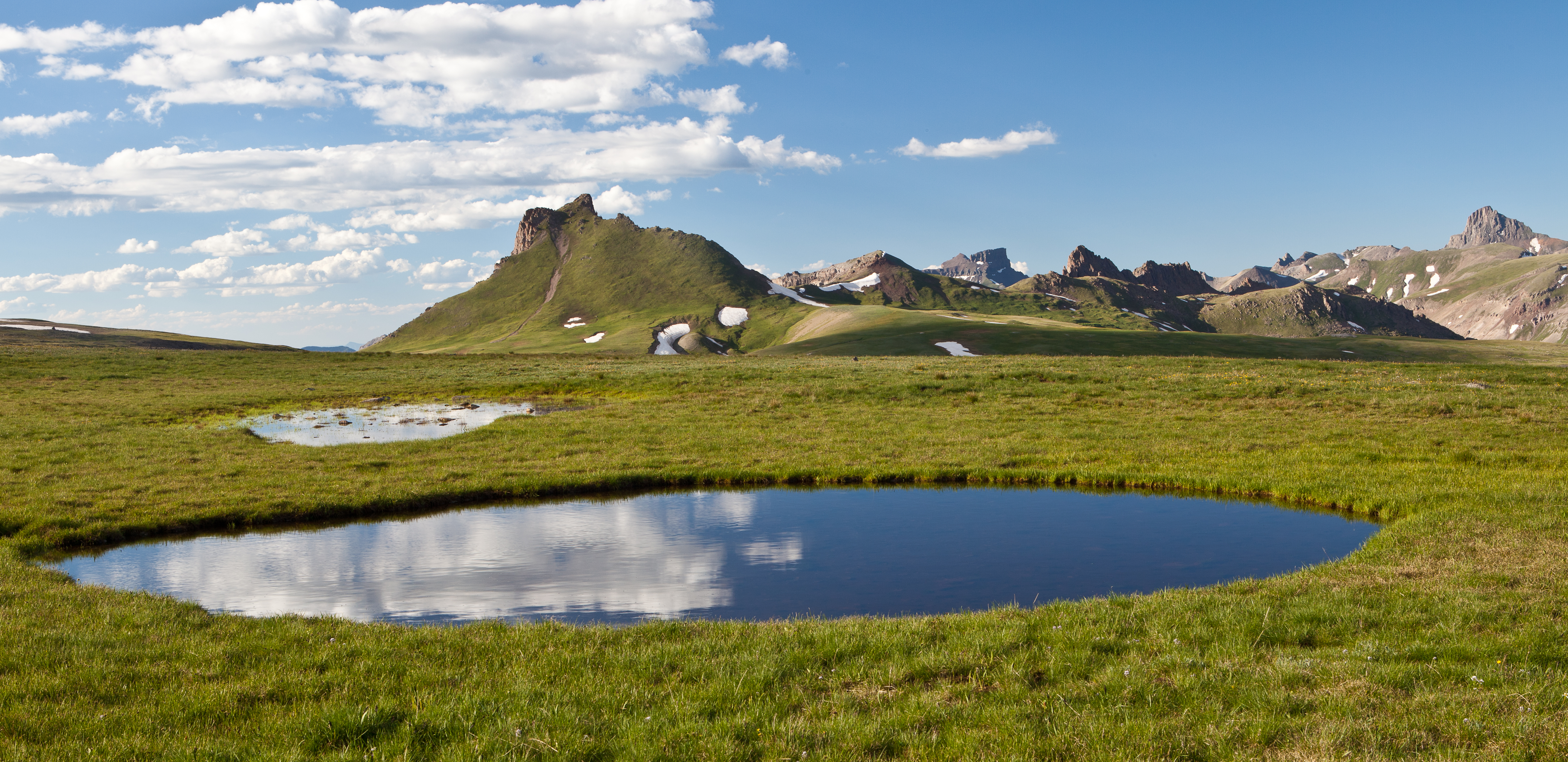
Uncompahgre Wilderness

=== State parks ===
- Paonia State Park

=== National recreation areas ===
- Curecanti National Recreation Area

=== National forests ===
- Gunnison National Forest
- White River National Forest

=== National wilderness areas ===
- Collegiate Peaks Wilderness
- Fossil Ridge Wilderness
- Maroon Bells-Snowmass Wilderness
- Powderhorn Wilderness
- Raggeds Wilderness
- Uncompahgre Wilderness
- West Elk Wilderness

=== Trails ===
- American Discovery Trail
- Colorado Trail
- Continental Divide National Scenic Trail
- Old Spanish National Historic Trail

=== Bicycle routes ===
- Great Parks Bicycle Route
- Western Express Bicycle Route

=== Scenic byways ===
- West Elk Loop Scenic Byway
- Silver Thread Scenic Byway

== Politics ==
For most of the 20th century, except 1964, Gunnison County was a Republican stronghold. Despite the nationwide swing against him, this was one of the few counties that swung towards Gerald Ford in 1976. However, beginning in the late 1980s, it began trending more Democratic, as Bill Clinton won the county both times in 1992 and 1996. The county gave a 43.2% plurality to George W. Bush in the 2000 election, and has voted for the Democratic candidate in every election since. In 2020, Joe Biden won a higher percentage of the vote than any Democrat since 1936.

United States presidential election results for Gunnison County, Colorado
Year	Republican		Democratic		Third party(ies)	
Year	No.	%	No.	%	No.	%
1880	1,012	48.68%	1,060	50.99%	7	0.34%
1884	1,245	54.20%	1,009	43.93%	43	1.87%
1888	904	55.73%	617	38.04%	101	6.23%
1892	588	38.71%	0	0.00%	931	61.29%
1896	150	6.17%	2,268	93.29%	13	0.53%
1900	945	37.02%	1,559	61.07%	49	1.92%
1904	1,348	49.67%	1,260	46.43%	106	3.91%
1908	889	35.35%	1,481	58.89%	145	5.77%
1912	553	24.03%	1,206	52.41%	542	23.55%
1916	736	29.65%	1,618	65.19%	128	5.16%
1920	1,055	47.46%	1,022	45.97%	146	6.57%
1924	1,122	44.70%	598	23.82%	790	31.47%
1928	1,456	55.21%	1,135	43.04%	46	1.74%
1932	985	33.78%	1,807	61.97%	124	4.25%
1936	978	30.42%	2,179	67.78%	58	1.80%
1940	1,556	46.43%	1,771	52.85%	24	0.72%
1944	1,221	46.30%	1,411	53.51%	5	0.19%
1948	1,103	44.23%	1,326	53.17%	65	2.61%
1952	1,533	59.46%	1,045	40.54%	0	0.00%
1956	1,400	62.31%	846	37.65%	1	0.04%
1960	1,296	55.31%	1,044	44.56%	3	0.13%
1964	903	36.96%	1,540	63.04%	0	0.00%
1968	1,411	58.19%	866	35.71%	148	6.10%
1972	2,231	63.60%	1,187	33.84%	90	2.57%
1976	2,568	61.88%	1,250	30.12%	332	8.00%
1980	2,756	55.45%	1,297	26.10%	917	18.45%
1984	3,100	67.32%	1,424	30.92%	81	1.76%
1988	2,520	55.72%	1,897	41.94%	106	2.34%
1992	1,662	28.86%	2,389	41.48%	1,708	29.66%
1996	2,230	37.04%	2,812	46.70%	979	16.26%
2000	3,128	43.23%	3,059	42.27%	1,049	14.50%
2004	3,479	41.32%	4,782	56.79%	159	1.89%
2008	3,131	35.29%	5,557	62.64%	183	2.06%
2012	3,341	38.55%	5,044	58.20%	282	3.25%
2016	3,289	34.94%	5,128	54.48%	995	10.57%
2020	3,735	33.38%	7,132	63.74%	323	2.89%
2024	3,689	33.71%	6,887	62.94%	366	3.34%

United States Senate election results for Gunnison County, Colorado2
Year	Republican		Democratic		Third party(ies)	
Year	No.	%	No.	%	No.	%
2020	3,978	35.71%	6,922	62.13%	241	2.16%

United States Senate election results for Gunnison County, Colorado3
Year	Republican		Democratic		Third party(ies)	
Year	No.	%	No.	%	No.	%
2022	2,905	31.70%	5,993	65.40%	266	2.90%

Colorado Gubernatorial election results for Gunnison County
Year	Republican		Democratic		Third party(ies)	
Year	No.	%	No.	%	No.	%
2022	2,733	29.92%	6,184	67.70%	218	2.39%

== Communities ==
=== City ===
- Gunnison

=== Towns ===
- Crested Butte
- Marble
- Mount Crested Butte
- Pitkin

=== Census Designated Place ===
- Somerset

=== Unincorporated communities ===
- Almont
- Doyleville
- Ohio City
- Parlin
- Powderhorn
- Sapinero
- Tincup

=== Ghost towns ===
- Aberdeen
- Baldwin
- Crystal
- Gothic
- Iola
- Pittsburg
- Vulcan

== In popular culture ==
In 2007, the science fiction horror film Aliens vs. Predator: Requiem was set in and around the town of Gunnison.

== See also ==
- Bibliography of Colorado
- Geography of Colorado
- History of Colorado
  - National Register of Historic Places listings in Gunnison County, Colorado
- Index of Colorado-related articles
- List of Colorado-related lists
  - List of counties in Colorado
- Outline of Colorado
