= Doyleville, Colorado =

Unincorporated community in Colorado, US

- Unincorporated community
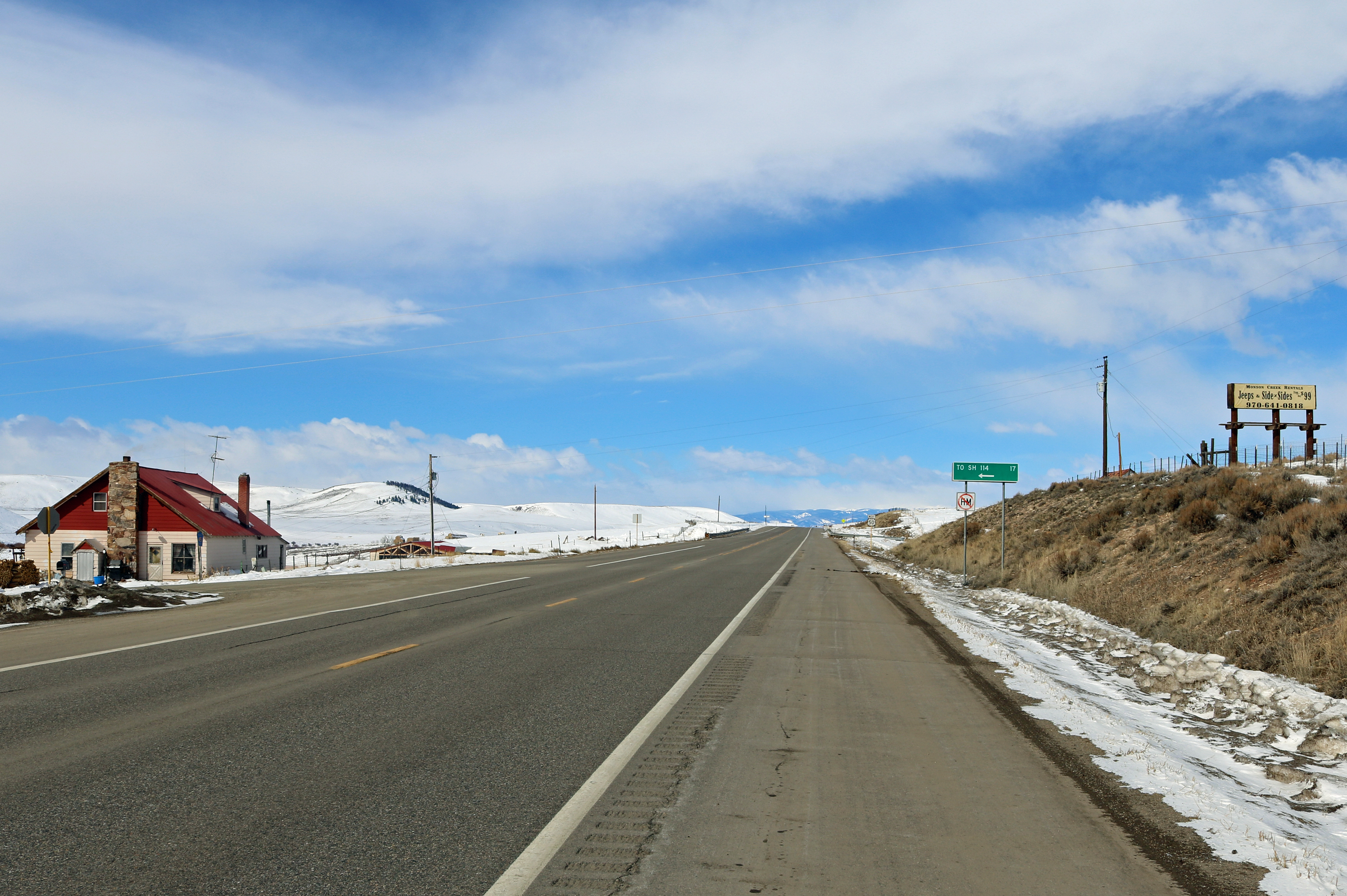
- Doyleville and Highway 50

- Location of Doyleville, Colorado. Doyleville (Colorado)
- Coordinates: 38°27′06″N 106°36′34″W
- Country: United States
- State: Colorado
- County: Gunnison
- <-- Settled -->: 1876
- Named for: Henry Doyle

Government
  - Type: Unincorporated community
  - Body: Gunnison County
- Elevation: 8,055 ft (2,455 m)
- Time zone: UTC−07:00 (MST)
  - Summer (DST): UTC−06:00 (MDT)
- ZIP code: Gunnison 81230
- Area codes: 970/748
- GNIS place ID: 204761

Doyleville is an unincorporated community located in the governed by Gunnison County, Colorado, United States. It is located 19 miles (31 km) east of Gunnison on U.S. Highway 50.

== History ==
Doyleville is named after Henry Doyle who, along with his wife Susan and their children, homesteaded 160 acres along Tomichi Creek in 1876. The settlement became a stop for the Barlow and Sanderson stage, and a train station was later established with the arrival of Denver and Rio Grande Railroad in the summer of 1881. The Doyleville station allowed area ranchers to ship hay and livestock by rail to markets east over the Continental Divide. The station also became active with passengers traveling to and from nearby Waunita Hot Springs. The Doyleville, Colorado, post office operated from October 24, 1881, until April 4, 1969. The Gunnison, Colorado, post office (ZIP code 81230) now serves the area.

Activity in Doyleville greatly diminished when the Denver and Rio Grande Railroad discontinued passenger service in 1940 and completely abandoned the line in 1955. The school was closed in 1966 and the post office was closed in 1969.

In its early years this settlement or its train station briefly assumed various names included Doyle, Doylestown, Gilman, and Hot Springs.

== See also ==
- List of populated places in Colorado
- Shavano (train)
