= East Fork San Juan River =

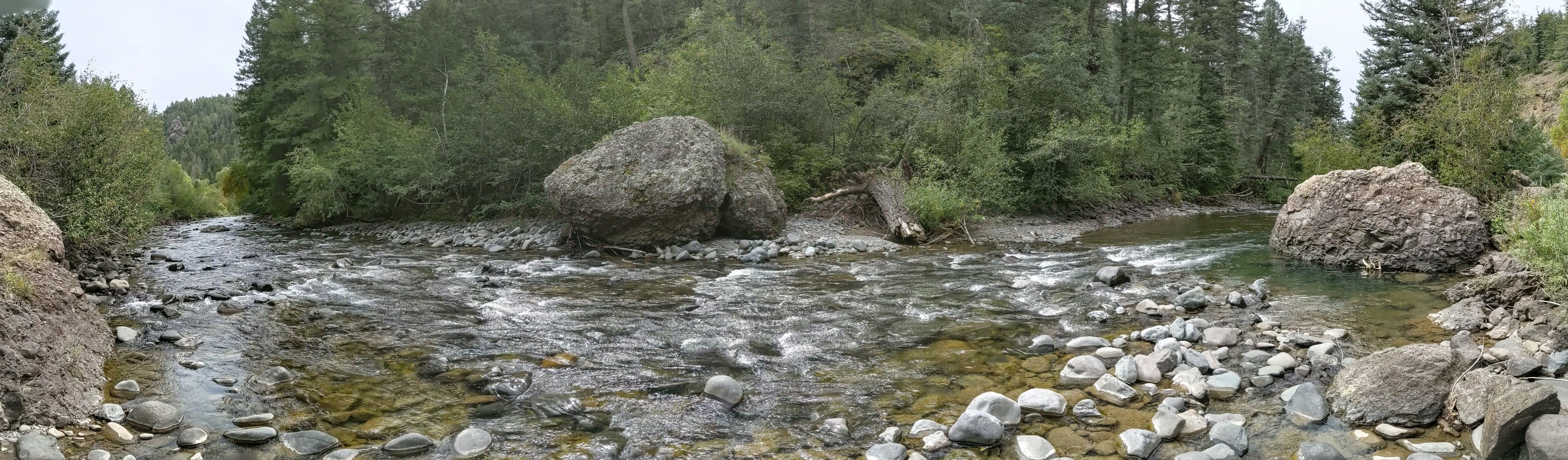

Physical characteristics
- Source
  - location: Mineral County, Colorado
  - coordinates: 37°24′38″N 106°54′02″W
- Mouth
  - location: Confluence with West Fork San Juan
  - coordinates: 37°21′55″N 106°54′02″W
  - elevation: 7,549 ft (2,301 m)

Basin features
- Progression: San Juan—Colorado

East Fork San Juan River is a tributary of the San Juan River in southern Colorado in the United States. The stream flows from the confluence of Crater Creek and Elwood Creek in Mineral County to a confluence with the West Fork San Juan River in Archuleta County that forms the San Juan River.

== See also ==
- List of rivers of Colorado
