= Sargents, Colorado =

Unincorporated community in Saguache County, CO, USA

- Unincorporated community
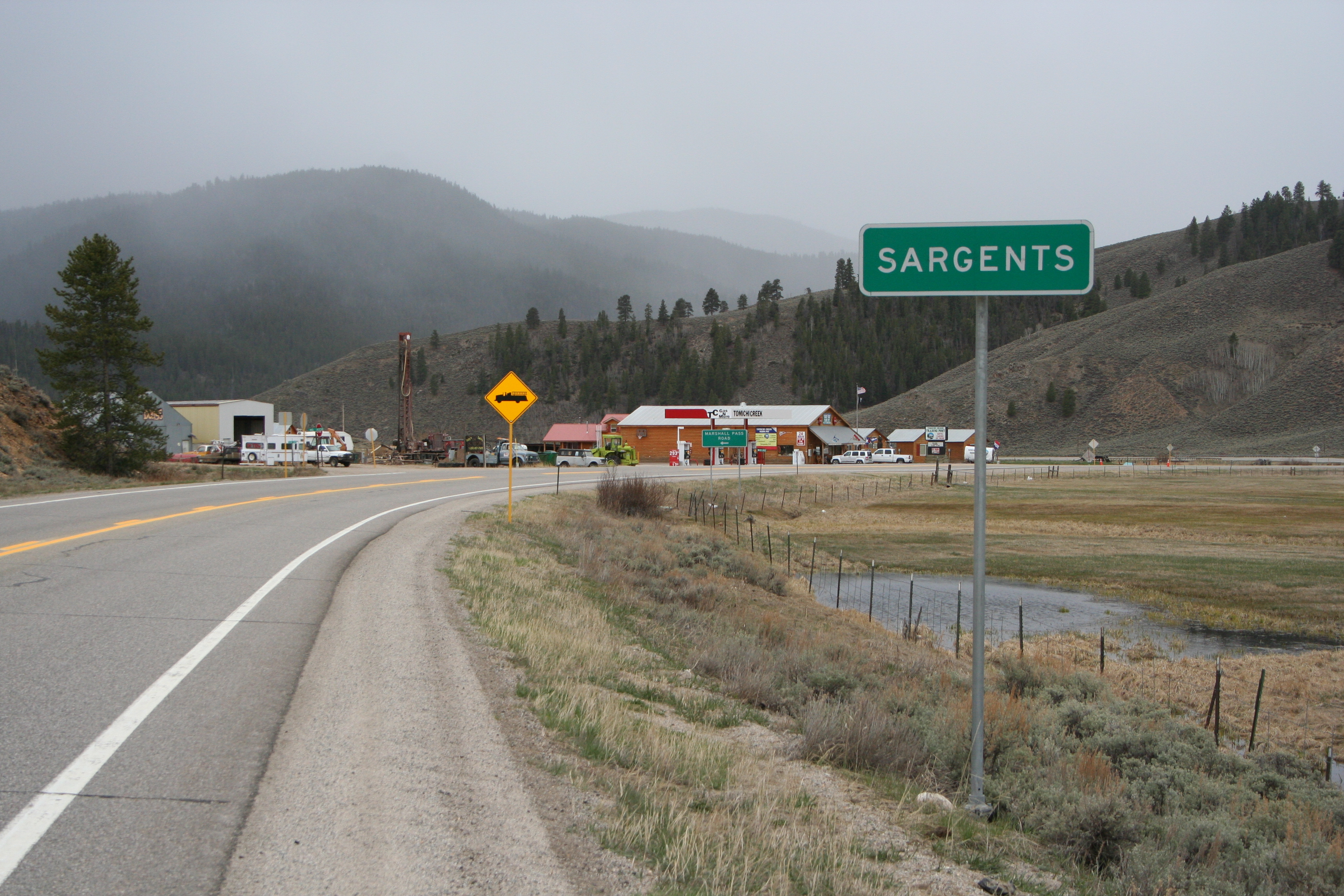
- Entering Sargents from the north.

- Location in Saguache County and the state of Colorado Sargents, Colorado (the United States)
- Coordinates: 38°24′15″N 106°24′54″W
- Country: United States
- State: Colorado
- County: Saguache County
- Elevation: 8,478 ft (2,584 m)
- Time zone: UTC-7 (MST)
  - Summer (DST): UTC-6 (MDT)
- ZIP code: 81248
- GNIS feature ID: 204762

Sargents is an unincorporated community and a U.S. Post Office in Saguache County, Colorado, United States. The Sargents Post Office has the ZIP code 81248.

== History ==
The community was established in 1880 and was originally called Marshalltown, named after nearby Marshall Pass. In 1882 the community was renamed Sargents after Joseph Sargent, a local cattleman and the settlement's first postmaster.

The town owed its existence to the Denver and Rio Grande Railroad which reached Marshalltown in 1881. The railroad line crossed the Continental Divide over Marshall Pass and descended 17 miles (27 km) to Marshalltown before following Tomichi Creek west to Gunnison. This line of the Denver & Rio Grande Railroad ultimately connected Denver, Colorado with Salt Lake City, Utah and points farther west. The station in Sargents was home to helper engines that were used to assist heavily laden trains over the pass. The Sargents station had a roundhouse, a turntable, and a water tank. It was an important depot for the export of mine ore and lumber produced in the area, and it was also used by passengers traveling to and from the mining camps and towns in the upper Tomichi Creek valley.

The population of Sargents greatly diminished when the Denver and Rio Grande Railroad discontinued passenger service in 1940 and completely abandoned the line in 1955. Partially offsetting the loss of the railroad was the construction of the transcontinental U.S. Highway 50. In 1939 the new highway was routed over the Continental Divide at nearby Monarch Pass and southwestward down Agate and Tomichi Creeks and through Sargents. The community still maintains some roadside services for highway travelers.

== Climate ==
According to the Köppen Climate Classification system, Sargents has a warm-summer humid continental climate, abbreviated "Dfb" on climate maps. The hottest temperature recorded in Sargents was 94 °F (34.4 °C) on June 16, 2021, while the coldest temperature recorded was −35 °F (−37.2 °C) on February 3, 2016.

Climate data for Sargents, Colorado, 1991–2020 normals, extremes 2012–present
Month	Jan	Feb	Mar	Apr	May	Jun	Jul	Aug	Sep	Oct	Nov	Dec	Year
Record high °F (°C)	53 (12)	55 (13)	76 (24)	78 (26)	86 (30)	94 (34)	97 (36)	93 (34)	91 (33)	84 (29)	70 (21)	57 (14)	97 (36)
Mean daily maximum °F (°C)	33.0 (0.6)	37.0 (2.8)	44.8 (7.1)	54.2 (12.3)	64.7 (18.2)	76.4 (24.7)	81.6 (27.6)	78.8 (26.0)	72.6 (22.6)	60.9 (16.1)	46.2 (7.9)	34.2 (1.2)	57.0 (13.9)
Daily mean °F (°C)	13.8 (−10.1)	17.1 (−8.3)	27.1 (−2.7)	36.9 (2.7)	45.1 (7.3)	54.0 (12.2)	60.2 (15.7)	57.8 (14.3)	50.1 (10.1)	39.0 (3.9)	27.2 (−2.7)	15.1 (−9.4)	37.0 (2.8)
Mean daily minimum °F (°C)	−5.4 (−20.8)	−2.8 (−19.3)	9.3 (−12.6)	19.6 (−6.9)	25.6 (−3.6)	31.5 (−0.3)	38.7 (3.7)	36.8 (2.7)	27.5 (−2.5)	17.1 (−8.3)	8.2 (−13.2)	−4.0 (−20.0)	16.8 (−8.4)
Record low °F (°C)	−34 (−37)	−35 (−37)	−28 (−33)	−13 (−25)	8 (−13)	18 (−8)	23 (−5)	23 (−5)	10 (−12)	−22 (−30)	−25 (−32)	−34 (−37)	−35 (−37)
Average precipitation inches (mm)	1.27 (32)	1.28 (33)	1.21 (31)	1.47 (37)	1.23 (31)	0.76 (19)	1.63 (41)	1.59 (40)	1.30 (33)	0.98 (25)	0.90 (23)	1.13 (29)	14.75 (374)
Average snowfall inches (cm)	21.5 (55)	19.0 (48)	14.6 (37)	12.1 (31)	2.7 (6.9)	0.2 (0.51)	0.0 (0.0)	0.0 (0.0)	0.2 (0.51)	3.6 (9.1)	11.8 (30)	19.6 (50)	105.3 (268.02)
Average precipitation days (≥ 0.01 in)	7.6	7.4	6.8	7.7	6.8	5.2	12.1	10.6	7.5	6.3	5.6	7.2	90.8
Average snowy days (≥ 0.1 in)	7.4	6.9	5.8	4.0	0.8	0.0	0.0	0.0	0.2	1.8	4.6	6.9	38.4
Source 1: NOAA
Source 2: National Weather Service

== See also ==
- List of municipalities in Colorado
