= Pittsburg, Colorado =

Unincorporated community in Colorado, United States

Coordinates: 38°57′08″N 107°03′45″W

Pittsburg is a former mining town from the late 19th century located about 9 miles north of Crested Butte, Colorado. While Pittsburg is sometimes considered a ghost town, none of the original structures still exist. The only cabins that still exist in the area were built after 1973 and are strictly summer vacation homes, as the area is inaccessible by cars during the winter.

Pittsburg was named in honor of the industrial heritage of Pittsburgh, Pennsylvania. A nearby mountain summit is named Schuylkill Mountain in honor of the Schuylkill River in Pennsylvania.

Pittsburg originally served several mining operations in the late 19th century, including the nearby Pittsburg Mine and the much larger and more well known Augusta Mine.
