= Marshall Pass =

Mountain pass in Colorado, USA

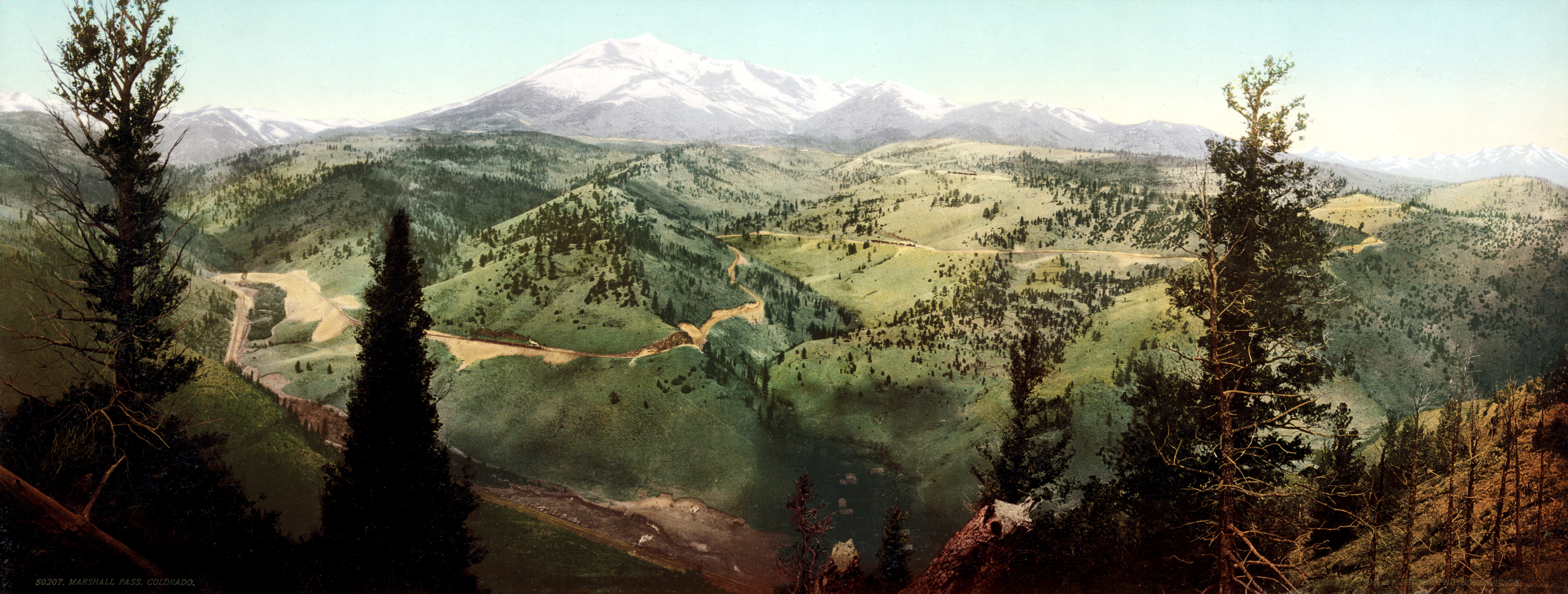
- Marshall Pass in 1899

- Location within Colorado
- Elevation: 10,842 ft (3,305 m)

Third Approach
- Location: Colorado, USA
- Range: Rocky Mountains
- Coordinates: 38°23′29″N 106°14′50″W

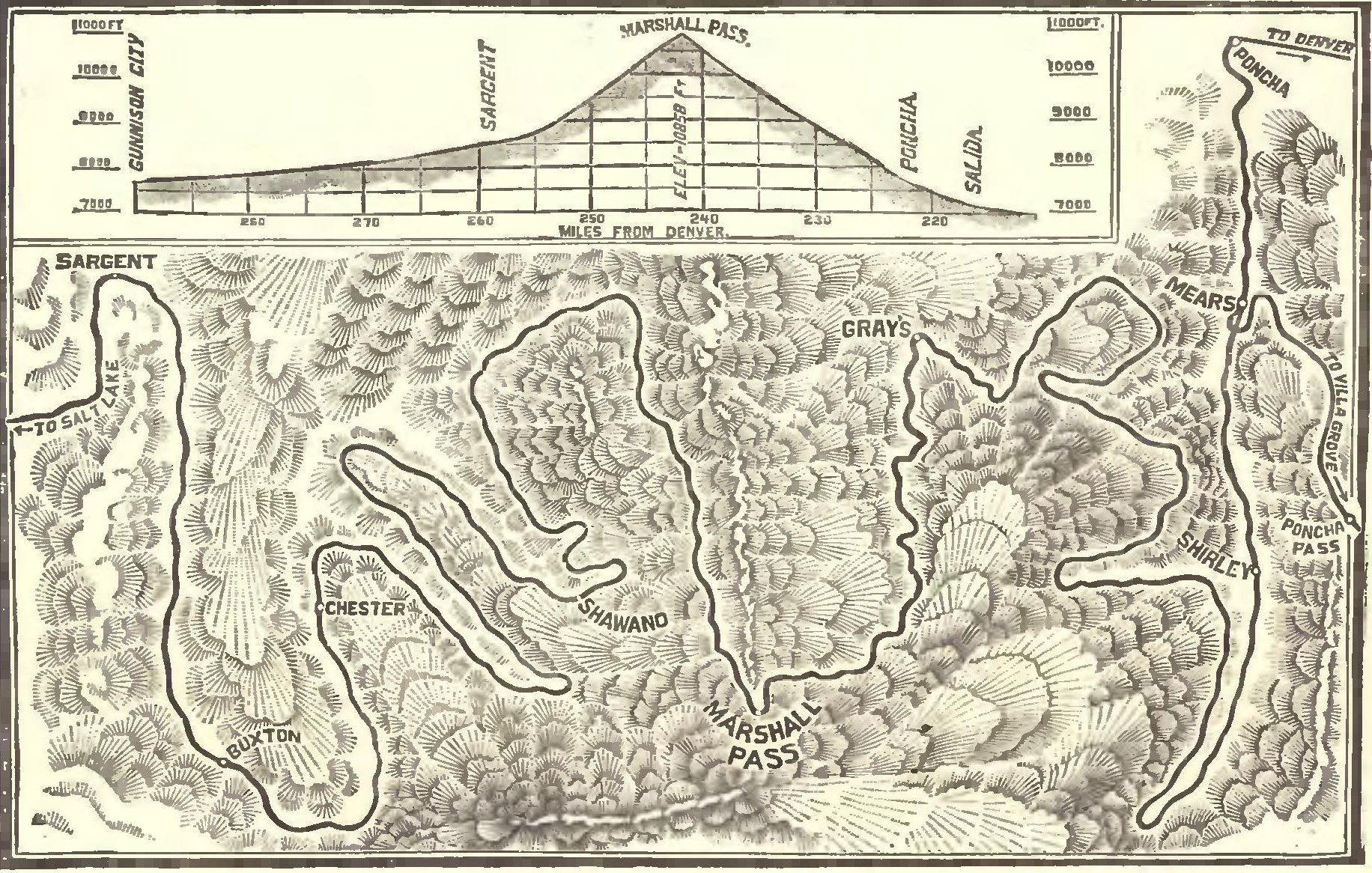
Map of Marshall Pass railroad line around 1895

Marshall Pass, elevation 10,842 ft (3,305 m), is a mountain pass in the Rocky Mountains of central-southern Colorado, US. It lies in northern Saguache County on the Continental Divide between the Sawatch Range to the north and the Cochetopa Hills to the south. The pass is part of a backcountry alternative to U.S. Highway 50 between Salida and Gunnison.

Marshall Pass was discovered by and named for Lt. William L. Marshall, of the Wheeler Survey, in 1873.

== History ==
When William Marshall first crossed the pass he realized that it would be a good route for a road, and shortly after this a company was organized to build a toll road. The Marshall Pass Toll Road was completed in 1880, with stagecoach service from Gunnison to the Arkansas River where it connected with the Denver and Rio Grande Western Railroad. The new road at the pass summit was barely passable, and the grades on both sides of the pass were reported to be very steep.

In 1881, the narrow gauge mainline of the Denver and Rio Grande Western Railroad was built across Marshall Pass on the way from Denver to Salt Lake City. This railroad line was completed before the Denver, South Park and Pacific Railroad completed the Alpine Tunnel, so it was the first crossing of the continental divide in Colorado by any railroad. The line reached Sargents, Colorado in August 1881. By 1884, the line was complete from Ogden, Utah to Denver.

The line saw the daily Shavano passenger train until closure. Interestingly, there are many reports of a phantom train chasing the Shavano along the route. The line closed with the Gunnison Division in 1955, and the rails were removed the same year.

Marshall Pass, Colorado was a small settlement, railroad station and post office, located at the pass. The population was 11 in 1948; there were six buildings then. Time Magazine called it "the U.S.'s smallest post office."

=== Water diversion ===
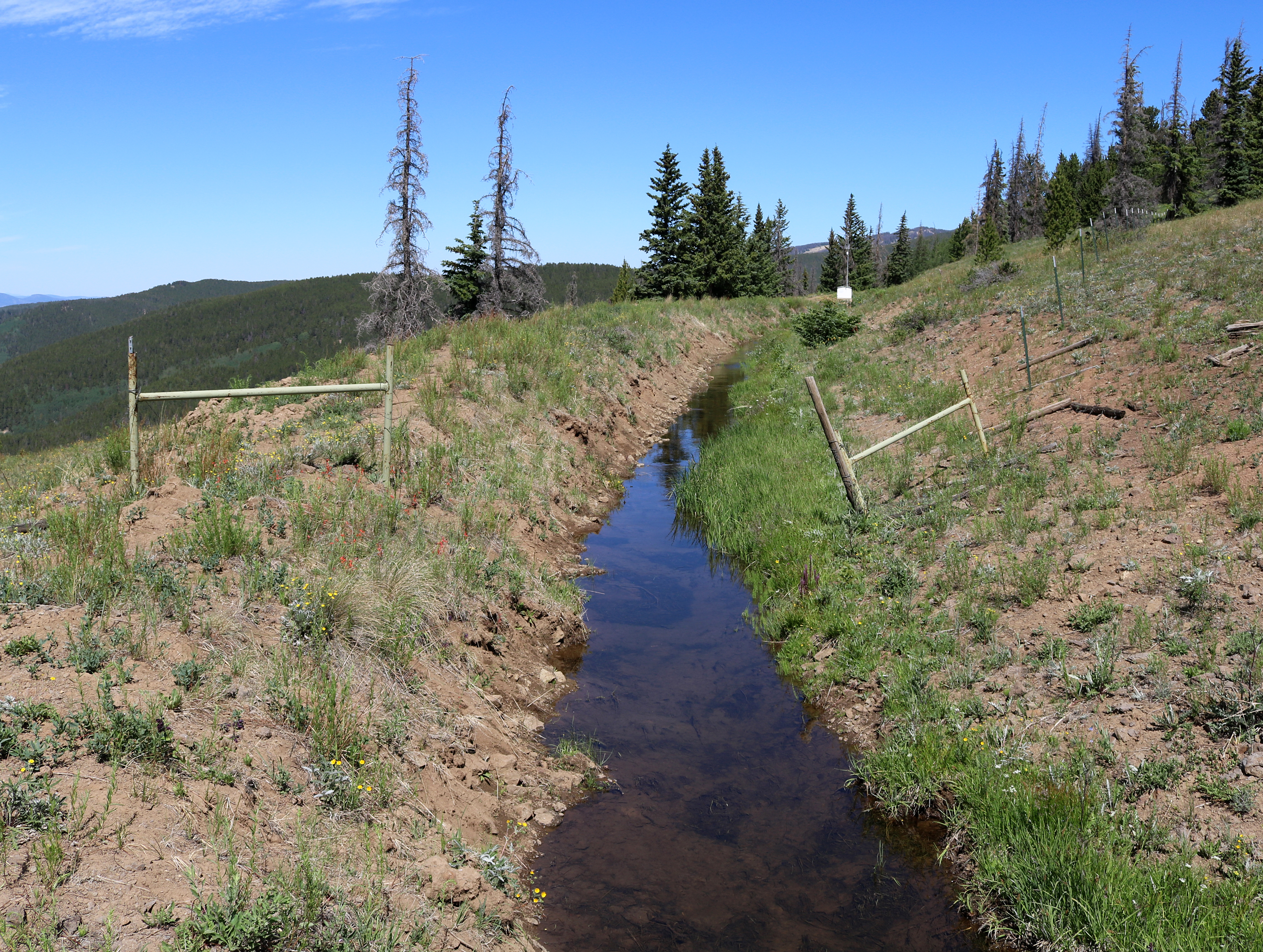
Larkspur Ditch at Marshall Pass

In 1939, the Catlin Canal Company built the Larkspur ditch to divert water from upper Harry Creek (a tributary of Marshall Creek and eventually Tomichi Creek) south over the continental divide at Marshall Pass, delivering its water into Poncha Creek and thence to the South Arkansas River. The 1.5 miles (2.4 km) ditch has a capacity of approximately 8 cubic feet per second (0.23 m^{3}/s) and average annual deliveries between 1990 and 1999 were 31 acre-feet (38,000 m^{3}).

The Lower Arkansas Valley Water Conservancy District entered a cooperative agreement with the Catlin Canal Company to improve the ditch in 2004, doubling the length of the ditch and increasing its average annual delivery to over 300 acre-feet (370,000 m^{3}). The water district completed purchase of the ditch in 2011.

== Geography ==
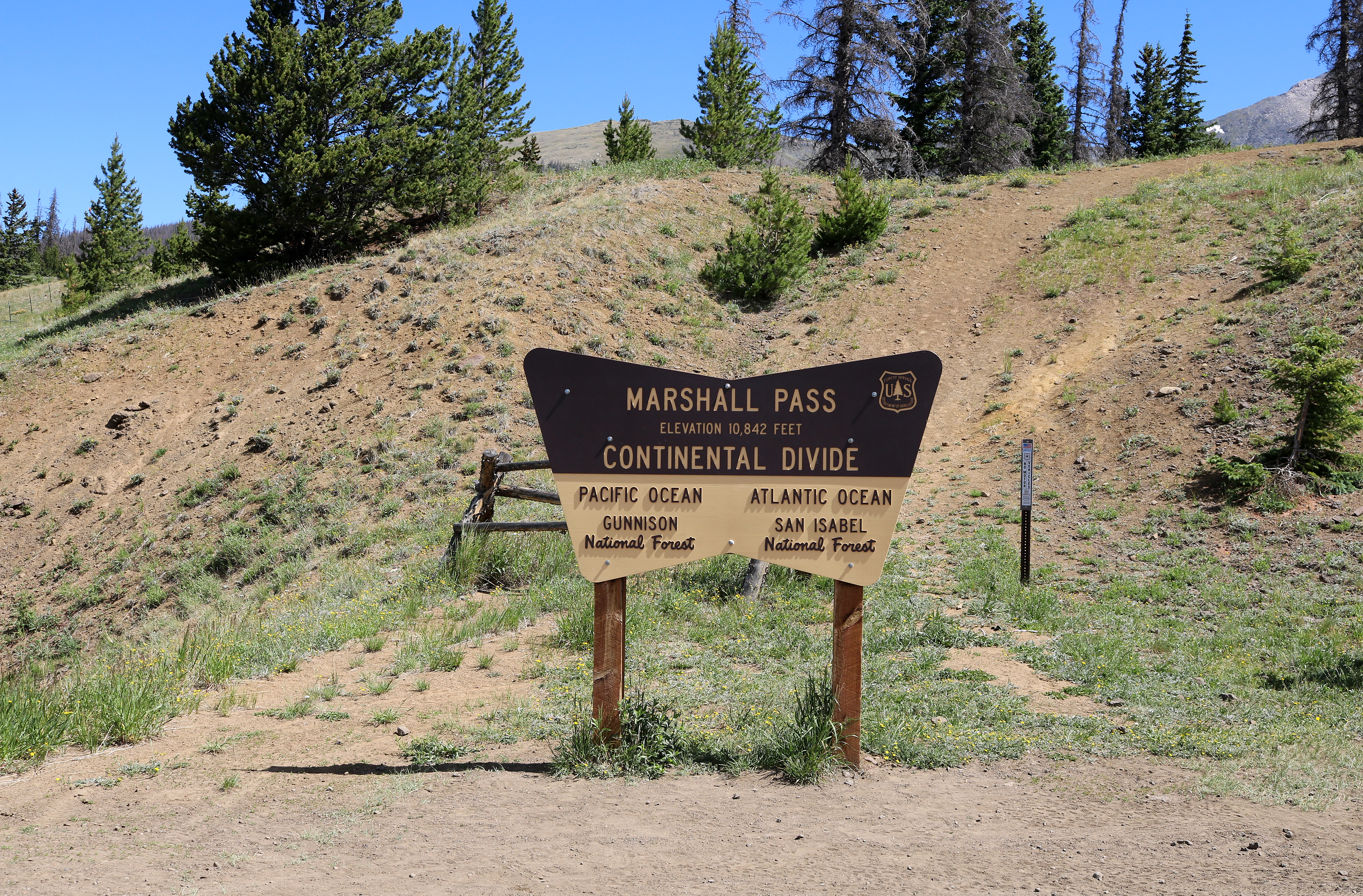
The sign at the top of the pass

Marshall Pass is just a few miles south of Monarch Pass, and in fact, both were considered as potential routes for U.S. 50, with the latter ultimately being chosen. Today, a gravel road still follows the old railroad route over Marshall Pass. In the summer and late fall, this drive is especially beautiful. It may be driven by regular passenger cars in good conditions.

From the east, take U.S. 285 south from Poncha Springs (near Salida) about 6 miles to County Road 200 and turn right; from the west turn right off U.S. 50 at Sargents. While grades are gentler (the railroad had a ruling grade of 4%) than on U.S. 50 over Monarch Pass (7% grades), please note that the Marshall Pass Road is closed to wheeled vehicles during the winter months. Marshall Pass is usually—but not always—a better route for small aircraft passing over the Continental Divide than is Monarch Pass.

== Gallery ==
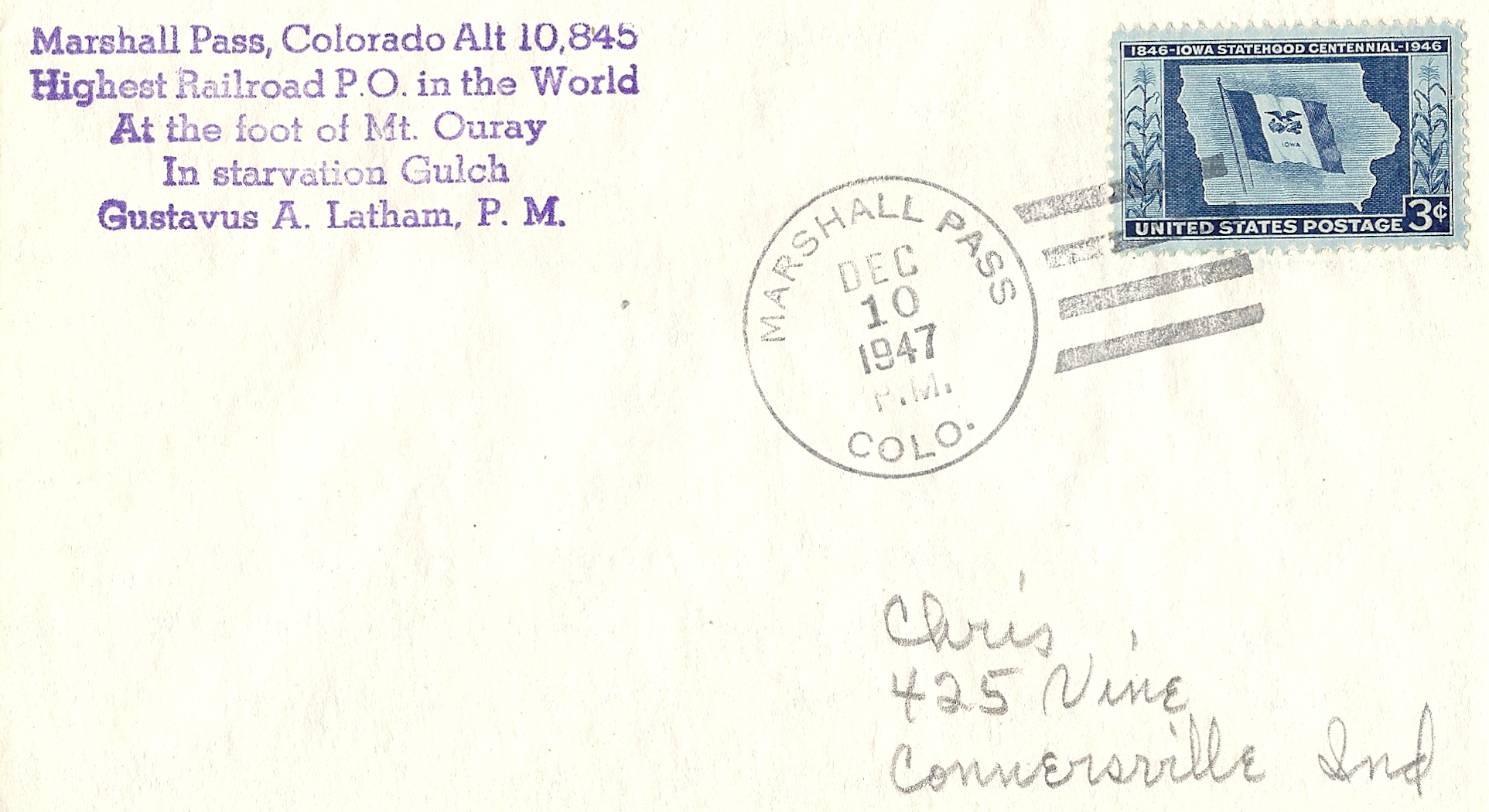
A great deal of Philatelic mail originated at the post office at Marshall Pass

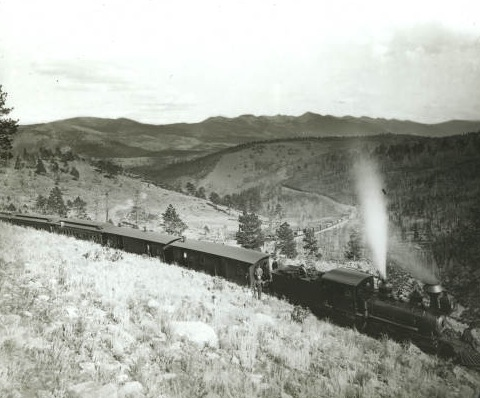
Denver & Rio Grande Railroad train at Marshall Pass, around 1890. Photo by William Henry Jackson.
