= Ohio City, Colorado =

Unincorporated community in Gunnison County, CO, USA

Ohio City, Colorado Ohio, Colorado
- Unincorporated community
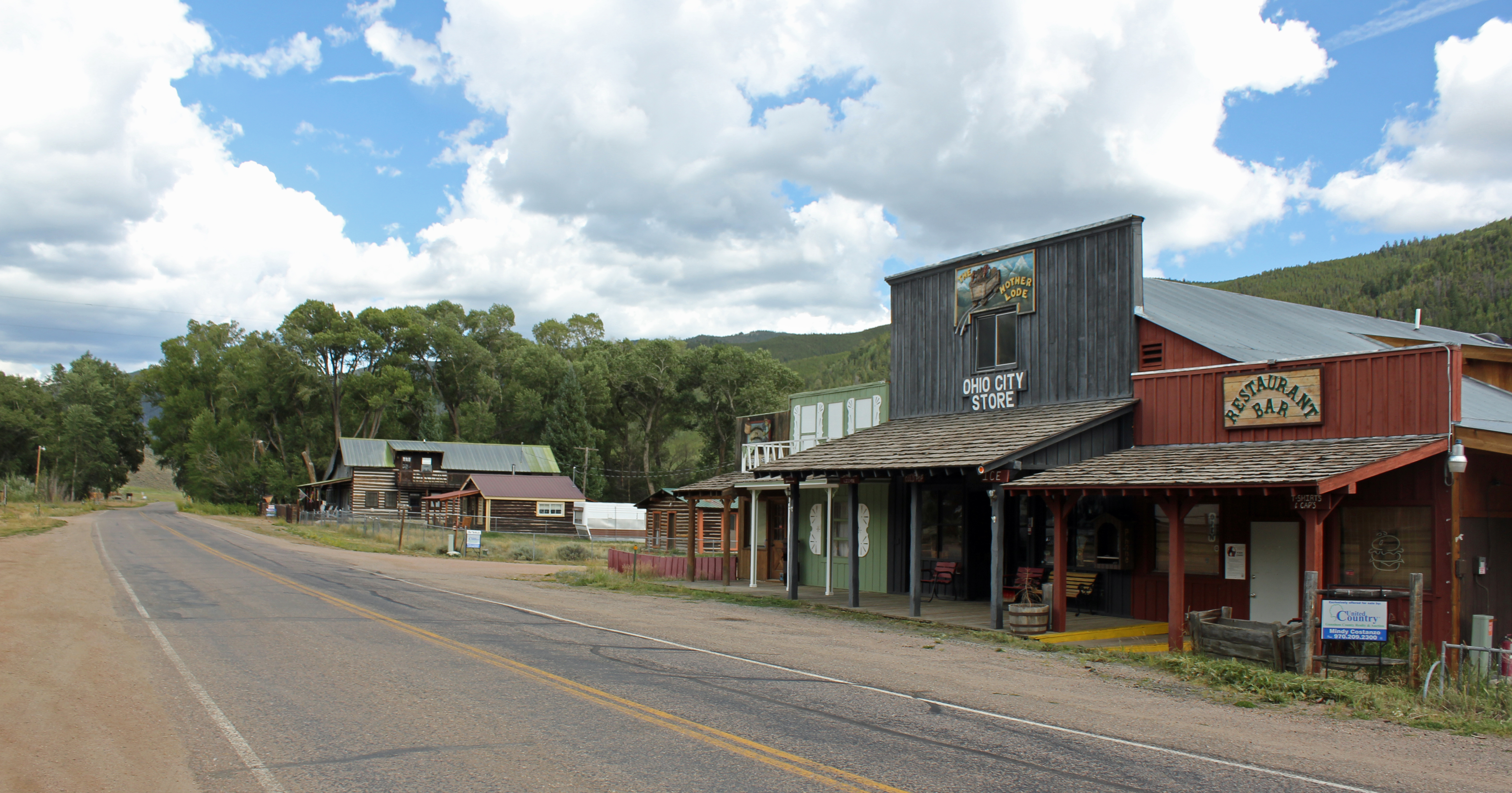
- Ohio City, August 2014

- Location within Colorado Location within the United States
- Coordinates: 38°34′00″N 106°36′42″W
- Country: United States
- State: Colorado
- County: Gunnison
- Elevation: 8,570 ft (2,610 m)
- Time zone: UTC-7 (MST)
  - Summer (DST): UTC-6 (MDT)
- ZIP code: 81237
- GNIS feature ID: 189049

Ohio City is an unincorporated community and a U.S. Post Office in Gunnison County, Colorado, United States. The Ohio City Post Office has the ZIP Code 81237.

== History ==
The community came into being around placer gold mining in the 1860s, although the source of the nuggets remained elusive. In 1879, a prospector, miner, and assayer named Jacob Hess discovered silver in Ohio Creek, until then known as Gold Creek. Hess moved his camp to Ohio Creek and named his settlement Eagle City, and officially became its first settler. In 1881, Ohio City was surveyed and platted. The following year, the Denver, South Park and Pacific Railroad was built through the town. After the collapse of the silver market in 1893 the community dwindled in population, and by 1898, Ohio City was nearly deserted.

However, the source of the first gold nuggets, having been discovered in 1896, prompted the multiple lucrative excavations including the Willow Creek Mine, which still yields feldspar, quartz, muscovite mica, graphic granite, and flakes of salvageable gold. Opportunity Mine (GPS N38 30.676 / W106 39.995) is also a popular source for blue beryl, cleavelandite, black tourmaline, and pink lepidolite.

== Mines ==
In 1898, the Cortland Mine in McIntyre Gulch was the only mine operating in the district. Three Harvard University students, the Carter brothers, surveyed land during the summers at the turn of the century. One brother, Carroll M. Carter, organized the Carter Mining Company.

Around the same time, E. M. Lamont organized the Raymond Consolidated Mines Company which mined locally.

From 1908-1912, the Colorado Smelting and Mining Company, headed by A. E. Reynolds, mined the Sacramento mine and the Silver Islet mine.

== Climate ==
Climate type is dominated by the winter season, a long, bitterly cold period with short, clear days, relatively little precipitation mostly in the form of snow, and low humidity. The Köppen Climate Classification sub-type for this climate is "Dfc" (Continental Subarctic Climate).

Climate data for Ohio City, Colorado
Month	Jan	Feb	Mar	Apr	May	Jun	Jul	Aug	Sep	Oct	Nov	Dec	Year
Mean daily maximum °C (°F)	−3 (26)	−1 (31)	6 (42)	13 (56)	19 (66)	24 (76)	27 (81)	26 (79)	22 (72)	16 (61)	7 (45)	−1 (30)	13 (55)
Mean daily minimum °C (°F)	−22 (−7)	−19 (−2)	−12 (11)	−6 (22)	−2 (29)	2 (36)	6 (43)	5 (41)	0 (32)	−6 (22)	−12 (10)	−19 (−3)	−7 (19)
Average precipitation mm (inches)	20 (0.8)	20 (0.8)	18 (0.7)	18 (0.7)	20 (0.8)	18 (0.7)	38 (1.5)	36 (1.4)	25 (1)	18 (0.7)	15 (0.6)	20 (0.8)	260 (10.3)
Source: Weatherbase
