= Pitkin, Colorado =

Town in Gunnison County, Colorado, United States

Town of Pitkin, Colorado
- Town
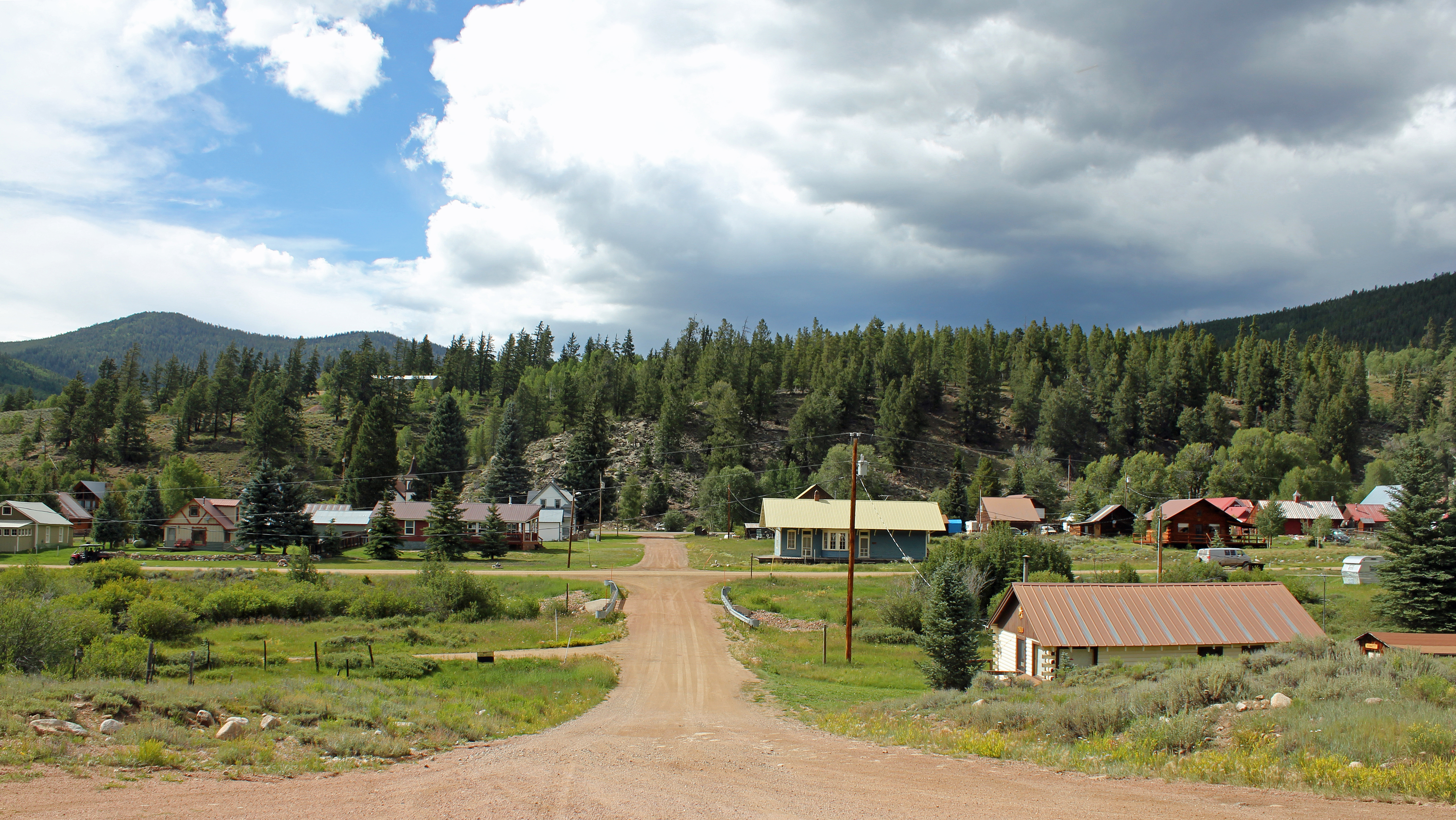
- Pitkin, August 2014

- Location of Pitkin in Gunnison County, Colorado.
- Coordinates: 38°36′31″N 106°30′54″W
- Country: United States
- State: Colorado
- County: Gunnison
- Incorporated: April 5, 1880

Government
  - Type: Statutory town

Area
  - Total: 0.26 sq mi (0.67 km^{2})
  - Land: 0.26 sq mi (0.67 km^{2})
  - Water: 0 sq mi (0.00 km^{2})
- Elevation: 9,229 ft (2,813 m)

Population (2020)
  - Total: 72
  - Density: 280/sq mi (110/km^{2})
- Time zone: UTC-7 (MST)
  - Summer (DST): UTC-6 (MDT)
- ZIP code: 81241
- Area code: 970
- FIPS code: 08-59830
- GNIS feature ID: 2413138
- Website: townofpitkin.colorado.gov

Pitkin is a statutory town in Gunnison County, Colorado, United States. The population was 72 at the 2020 census.

Pitkin was founded in 1879, and is said to be Colorado's first mining camp west of the Continental Divide. Originally named Quartzville, it was renamed to honor Governor Frederick Walker Pitkin.

== Geography ==
Pitkin is about 28 miles northeast of Gunnison, Colorado.

According to the United States Census Bureau, the town has a total area of 0.3 square miles (0.78 km^{2}), all of it land.

== Demographics ==
Historical population
| Census | Pop. | Note | %± |
|---|---|---|---|
| 1880 | 1,891 | | — |
| 1890 | 371 | | −80.4% |
| 1900 | 203 | | −45.3% |
| 1910 | 250 | | 23.2% |
| 1920 | 165 | | −34.0% |
| 1930 | 228 | | 38.2% |
| 1940 | 156 | | −31.6% |
| 1950 | 152 | | −2.6% |
| 1960 | 94 | | −38.2% |
| 1970 | 44 | | −53.2% |
| 1980 | 59 | | 34.1% |
| 1990 | 53 | | −10.2% |
| 2000 | 124 | | 134.0% |
| 2010 | 66 | | −46.8% |
| 2020 | 72 | | 9.1% |
U.S. Decennial Census

== See also ==
- List of municipalities in Colorado
