= Parlin, Colorado =

Unincorporated community in Gunnison County, CO, USA

- Unincorporated community
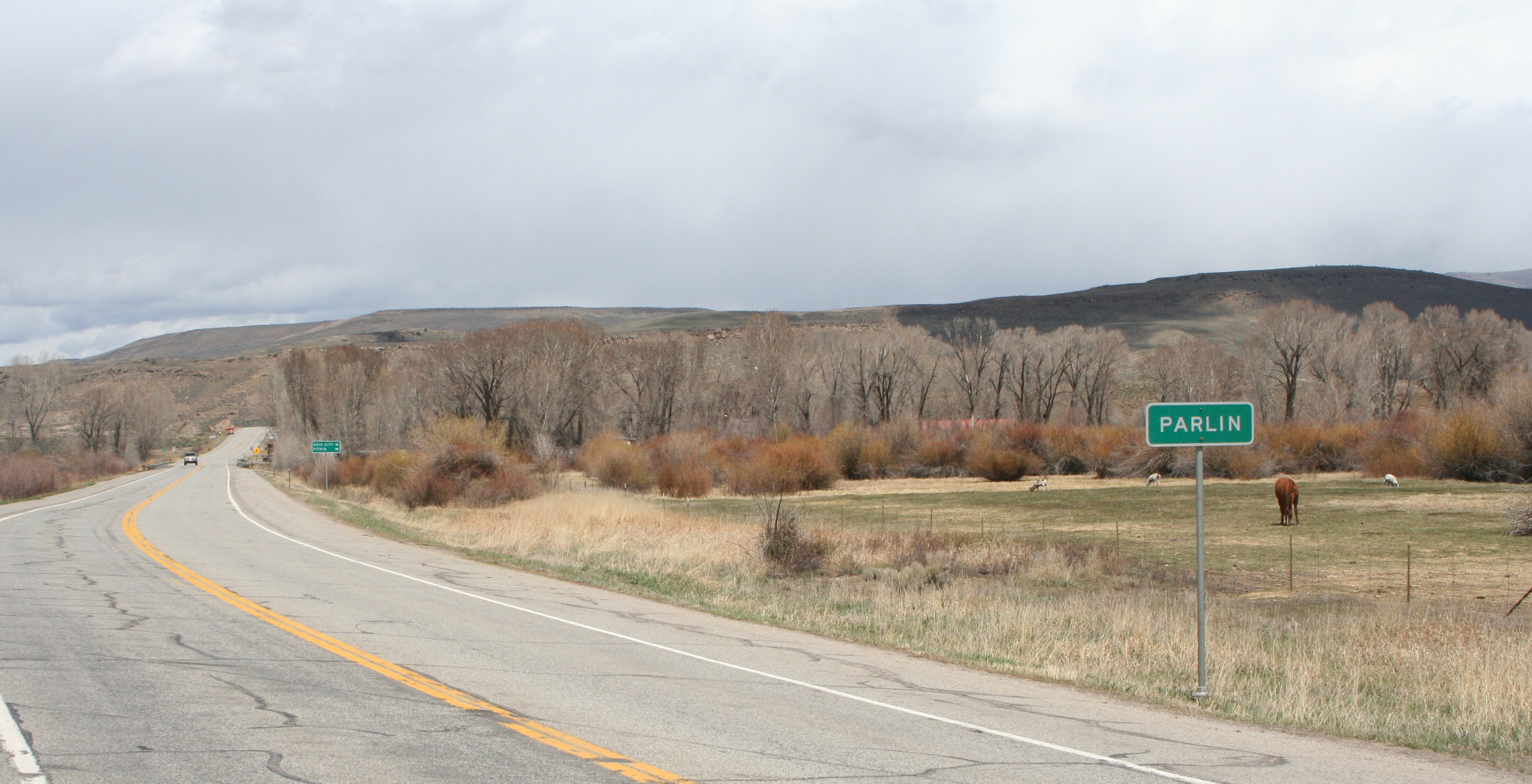
- Entering Parlin

- Location within Colorado Location within the United States
- Coordinates: 38°30′10″N 106°43′42″W
- Country: United States
- State: Colorado
- County: Gunnison County
- <-- Settled -->: 1877
- Elevation: 7,933 ft (2,418 m)
- Time zone: UTC-7 (MST)
  - Summer (DST): UTC-6 (MDT)
- ZIP code: 81239
- GNIS feature ID: 189019

Parlin is an unincorporated community and a U.S. Post Office in Gunnison County, Colorado, United States. The Parlin Post Office has the ZIP Code 81239.

== History ==
The town is named after rancher John Tufts Parlin who moved to the area from Maine in 1876. The Parlin ranch was called the 76 ranch and cattle were all branded with the numbers "76". County Road 76 is named after the ranch. The local hot springs, Waunita Hot Springs is named after Parlin's niece, Waunita.

== Climate ==
Climate type is dominated by the winter season, a long, bitterly cold period with short, clear days, relatively little precipitation mostly in the form of snow, and low humidity. The Köppen Climate Classification sub-type for this climate is "Dfc" (Continental Subarctic Climate).

Climate data for Parlin, Colorado
Month	Jan	Feb	Mar	Apr	May	Jun	Jul	Aug	Sep	Oct	Nov	Dec	Year
Mean daily maximum °C (°F)	−2 (28)	1 (33)	6 (43)	12 (54)	18 (65)	24 (76)	27 (81)	26 (79)	22 (72)	16 (61)	7 (45)	−1 (31)	13 (56)
Mean daily minimum °C (°F)	−21 (−5)	−18 (0)	−11 (12)	−6 (21)	−2 (29)	2 (35)	6 (42)	5 (41)	0 (32)	−6 (22)	−12 (11)	−18 (−1)	−7 (20)
Average precipitation mm (inches)	18 (0.7)	15 (0.6)	18 (0.7)	20 (0.8)	23 (0.9)	18 (0.7)	41 (1.6)	46 (1.8)	25 (1)	20 (0.8)	15 (0.6)	20 (0.8)	280 (11)
Average precipitation days	6	6	6	6	6	5	9	10	6	5	5	6	76
Source: Weatherbase

== See also ==
- List of cities and towns in Colorado
- Old Spanish Trail (trade route)
