= List of Colorado placenames of Native American origin =

Coordinates: 38.9972°N 105.5478°W

The location of the State of Colorado in the United States of America.

The following list includes settlements, geographic features, and political subdivisions of Colorado whose names are derived from Native American languages.

== Listings ==
=== Counties ===
- Arapahoe County – named for the Arapahoe people.
  - Village of Arapahoe
  - Arapahoe City
- Cheyenne County – named for the Cheyenne people.
  - Village of Cheyenne Wells
  - Cheyenne Mountain State Park
- Kiowa County – named for the Kiowa people.
- Montezuma County – named for the Aztec emperor Moctezuma II of Mexico.
  - Montezuma
  - Montezuma Creek
- Ouray County - named Ute chief Ouray
  - City of Ouray
  - Mount Ouray
- Saguache County – name comes from the Ute language noun "sawup" /səˈwʌp/ meaning "sand dunes". (Note: The name "Saguache" is pronounced /səˈwætʃ/. This name comes from the Ute language noun "sawup" /səˈwʌp/ meaning "sand dunes". The Spanish language version of this name is usually spelled "Saguache", while the English language version is usually spelled "Sawatch".)
  - City of Saguache
  - Saguache Creek
- Yuma County – named for the Quechan people of Arizona and California.
  - City of Yuma

=== Settlements ===
- Cheraw
- Chipita Park
  - Cascade-Chipita Park
- Comanche Creek – named after the Comanche people.
- Cotopaxi – named after the Cotopaxi volcano in Ecuador.
- Dakota Ridge – named after the Dakota people.
- Erie – named after Erie, Pennsylvania
- Fort Massachusetts named after the state of Massachusetts.
- Fort Namaqua
- Fort Uncompahgre – from the Ute word for "red lake"
  - Uncompahgre River
  - Uncompahgre Wilderness
  - Uncompahgre Peak
  - Uncompahgre Plateau
  - Uncompahgre National Forest
  - Uncompahgre Gorge
- Genesee
- Kinikinik – named for the kinnickinnick plant.
- Kiowa – named after the Kiowa people.
  - Kiowa Creek
- Kokomo – named after Kokomo, Indiana.
- Manitou Springs
- Niwot – named after Chief Niwot.
- Olathe – named after Olathe, Kansas.
- Pagosa Springs
- Peoria – named after the Peoria people.
- Shawnee – named after the Shawnee people.
- Southern Ute – named after the Southern Ute people.
- Towaoc
- Yampa – named after the Snake Indian word for perideridia.
  - Yampa River
  - Yampa River State Park

=== Bodies of water ===
- Apishapa River – Ute word for "smelly".
  - North Fork Apishapa River
- Arikaree River – named after the Arikara people.
  - North Fork Arikaree River
- Arkansas River – named after the state of Arkansas.
  - South Arkansas River
  - East Fork Arkansas River
  - North Fork South Arkansas River
  - Middle Fork South Arkansas River
  - Arkansas Headwaters Recreation Area
- Canadian River – named after the country of Canada.
  - North Fork Canadian River
  - South Fork Canadian River
  - Canadian River (North Platte River tributary)
- Chamita River
- Cochetopa Creek
- Illinois River named after the state of Illinois.
- Michigan River – named after the state of Michigan.
  - North Fork Michigan River
  - South Fork Michigan River
  - Dry Fork Michigan River
- Navajo River – named after the Navajo people.
  - Little Navajo River
  - East Fork Navajo River
  - Navajo State Park
- Pawnee Creek – named after the Pawnee people.
  - Pawnee National Grassland
- Piceance Creek – from the Shoshone word piasonittsi, meaning "tall grass".
- Rio Chama
  - West Fork Rio Chama
  - East Fork Rio Chama
- Tennessee Creek – named after the state of Tennessee.
- Tomichi Creek

=== Other ===
- Amache National Historic Site – named after Amache Prowers.
- Mount Antero – named after Antero, a Ute chief.
- Arapaho National Wildlife Refuge
- Comanche National Grassland named after the Comanche people.
  - Comanche Peak Wilderness
- Neota Wilderness
- Rawah Wilderness
- Uncompahgre Wilderness -gets its name from a Ute Indian word meaning, in one translation, "dirty water".
- Weminuche Wilderness named after the Weminuche people.

== See also ==
- List of place names in the United States of Native American origin
- Bibliography of Colorado
- Geography of Colorado
- History of Colorado
- Index of Colorado-related articles
- List of Colorado-related lists
- Outline of Colorado
