= Tennessee Creek =

Tennessee Creek may refer to:

- Tennessee Creek (Arkansas River), a stream in Colorado
- Tennessee Creek (Mississippi), a stream in Mississippi
- Tennessee Creek (Missouri), a stream in Missouri
