= Mount Tweto =

Mountain in the state of Colorado

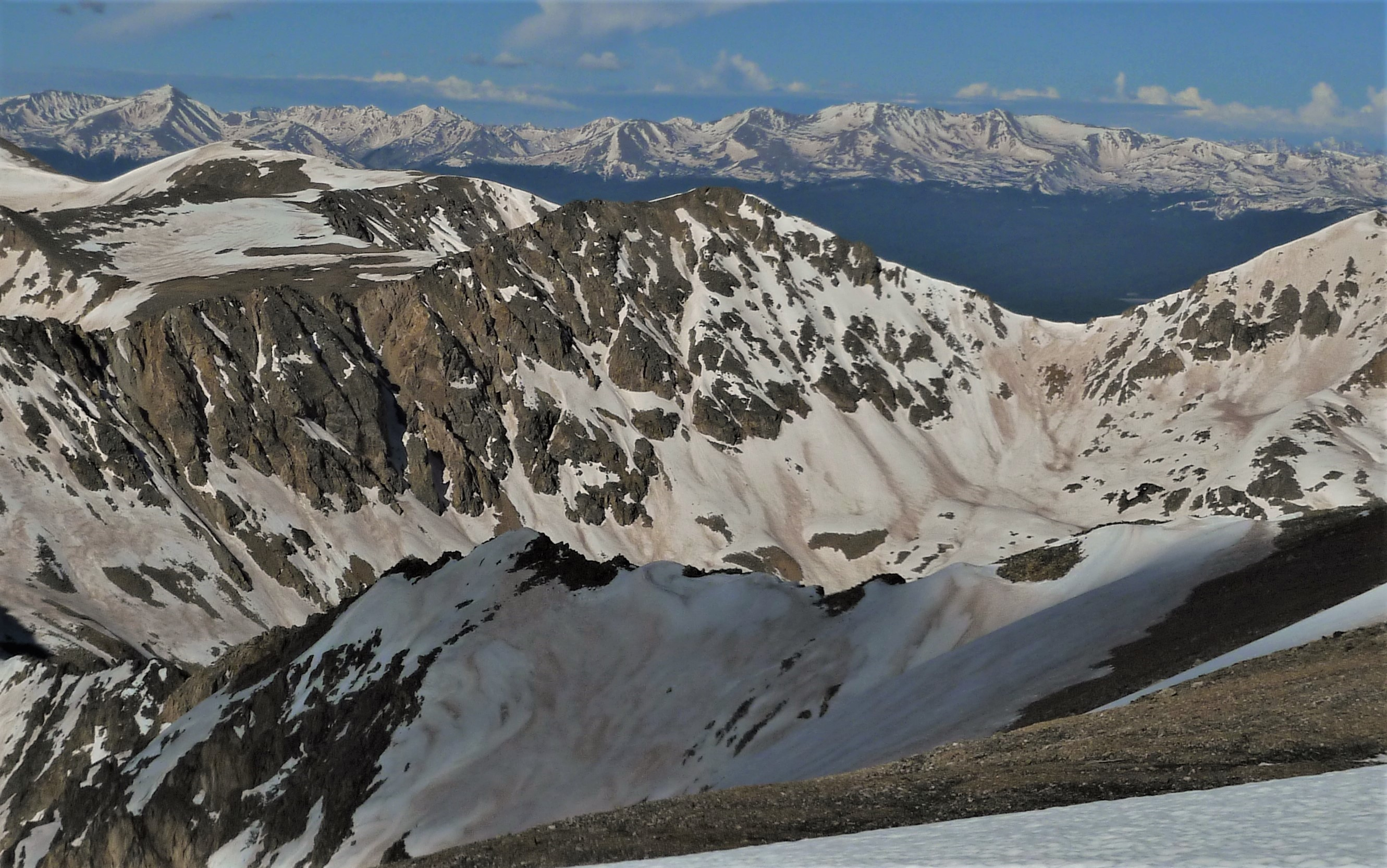
- Northeast aspect centered, view from Mt. Democrat

Highest point
- Elevation: 13,672 ft (4,167 m)
- Prominence: 428 ft (130 m)
- Parent peak: Mount Arkansas (13,795 ft)
- Isolation: 0.85 mi (1.37 km)
- Coordinates: 39°19′20″N 106°10′10″W

Naming
- Etymology: Ogden Tweto

Geography
- Location within Colorado Location within the United States
- Country: United States
- State: Colorado
- County: Lake / Park
- Protected area: San Isabel National Forest; Pike National Forest
- Parent range: Rocky Mountains; Mosquito Range
- Topo map: USGS Climax

Climbing
- Easiest route: Hiking class 2

Mount Tweto is a 13,672-foot (4,167 m) mountain summit on the boundary shared by Lake County and Park County, in Colorado, United States.

== Description ==
Mount Tweto is set just east of the Continental Divide in the Mosquito Range, which is a subrange of the Rocky Mountains. It ranks as the 12th-highest peak in Park County and the 157th-highest in Colorado. The mountain is located eight miles (13 km) northeast of the community of Leadville on land managed by San Isabel National Forest and Pike National Forest. Precipitation runoff from the mountain's north and west slopes drains into the headwaters of the East Fork Arkansas River, whereas the south slope drains into the headwaters of Mosquito Creek which is a tributary of the Middle Fork South Platte River. Topographic relief is significant as the summit rises 3,400 feet (1,036 m) above the East Fork Arkansas in 2.75 miles (4.43 km) and 2,100 feet (640 m) above Mosquito Creek in 1.5 miles (2.4 km). An ascent of the peak involves hiking seven miles (11 km) with 2,900 feet (884 m) of elevation gain. The mountain's toponym was officially adopted in 1986 by the United States Board on Geographic Names to honor Ogden L. Tweto (1912–1983), U.S. Geological Survey geologist who spent the major part of his career studying the geology of Colorado, in particular the area of this peak.

== Climate ==
According to the Köppen climate classification system, Mount Tweto is located in an alpine subarctic climate zone with cold, snowy winters, and cool to warm summers. Due to its altitude, it receives precipitation all year, as snow in winter and as thunderstorms in summer, with a dry period in late spring.

== See also ==
- List of mountain peaks of Colorado
- Thirteener
