= Mount Arkansas =

Mountain in Colorado, United States

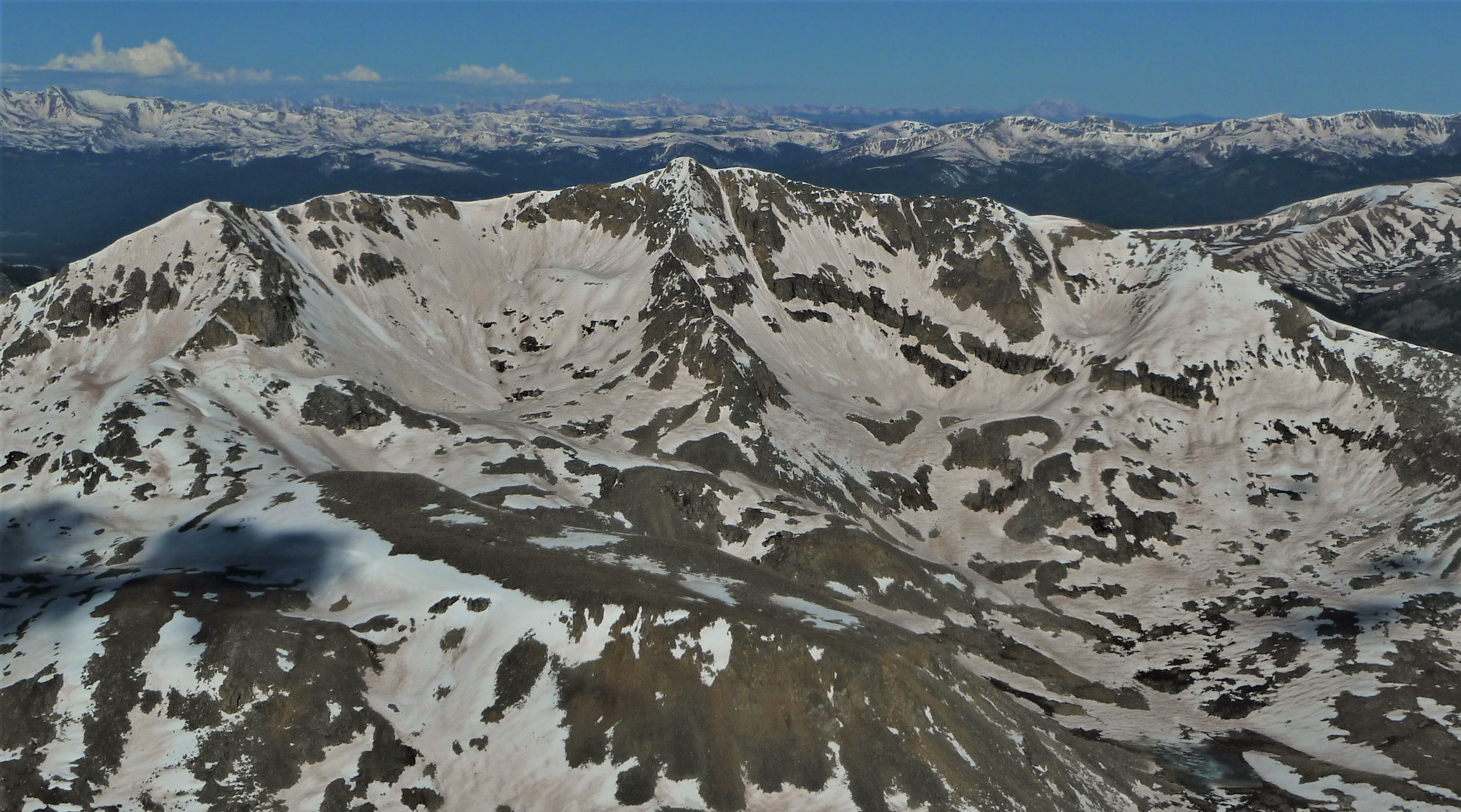
- East aspect, viewed from Mt. Democrat

Highest point
- Elevation: 13,795 ft (4,205 m)
- Prominence: 555 ft (169 m)
- Parent peak: Mount Buckskin (13,872 ft)
- Isolation: 1.89 mi (3.04 km)
- Coordinates: 39°19′57″N 106°10′42″W

Naming
- Etymology: Arkansas River

Geography
- Location within Colorado Location within the United States
- Country: United States
- State: Colorado
- County: Lake
- Protected area: San Isabel National Forest
- Parent range: Rocky Mountains; Mosquito Range
- Topo map: USGS Climax

Climbing
- Easiest route: Hiking class 2

Mount Arkansas is a 13,795-foot (4,205 m) mountain summit in Lake County, Colorado, United States.

== Description ==
Mount Arkansas is set just east of the Continental Divide in the Mosquito Range, which is a subrange of the Rocky Mountains. It ranks as the 12th-highest peak in Lake County and the 107th-highest in Colorado. The mountain is located eight miles (13 km) northeast of the community of Leadville on land managed by San Isabel National Forest. It dominates the view from Highway 91 south of Fremont Pass. Precipitation runoff from the mountain's slopes drains into headwaters of the East Fork Arkansas River. Topographic relief is significant as the summit rises 3,400 feet (1,036 m) above the river in two miles (3.2 km). An ascent of the peak involves hiking seven miles (11 km) with 2,900 feet (884 m) of elevation gain. The mountain's toponym has been officially adopted by the United States Board on Geographic Names, and has been recorded in publications since 1877.

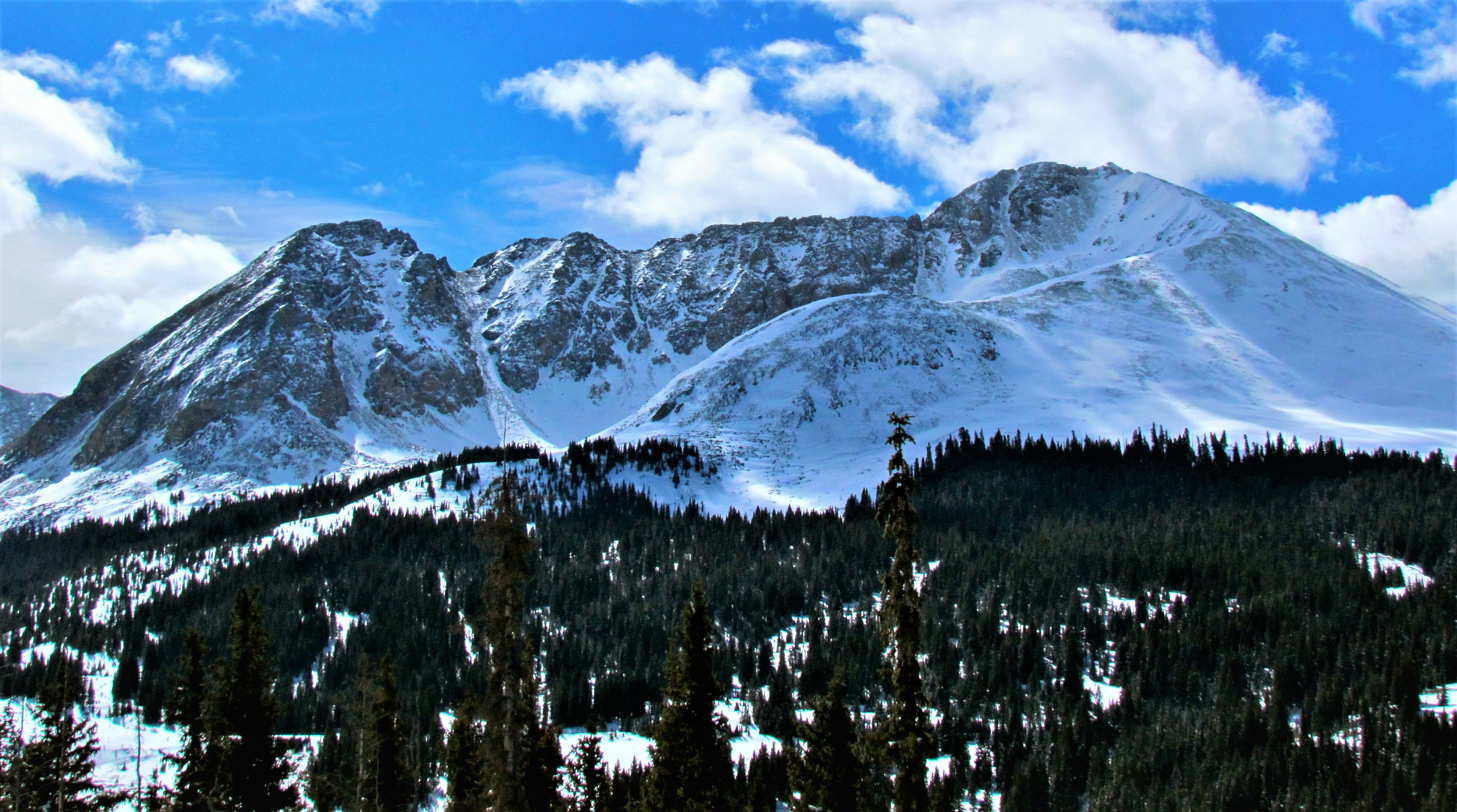
North side of Mt. Arkansas

== Climate ==
According to the Köppen climate classification system, Mount Arkansas is located in an alpine subarctic climate zone with cold, snowy winters, and cool to warm summers. Due to its altitude, it receives precipitation all year, as snow in winter and as thunderstorms in summer, with a dry period in late spring.

== See also ==
- List of mountain peaks of Colorado
- Thirteener
