= Cronin Peak =

Mountain in the state of Colorado

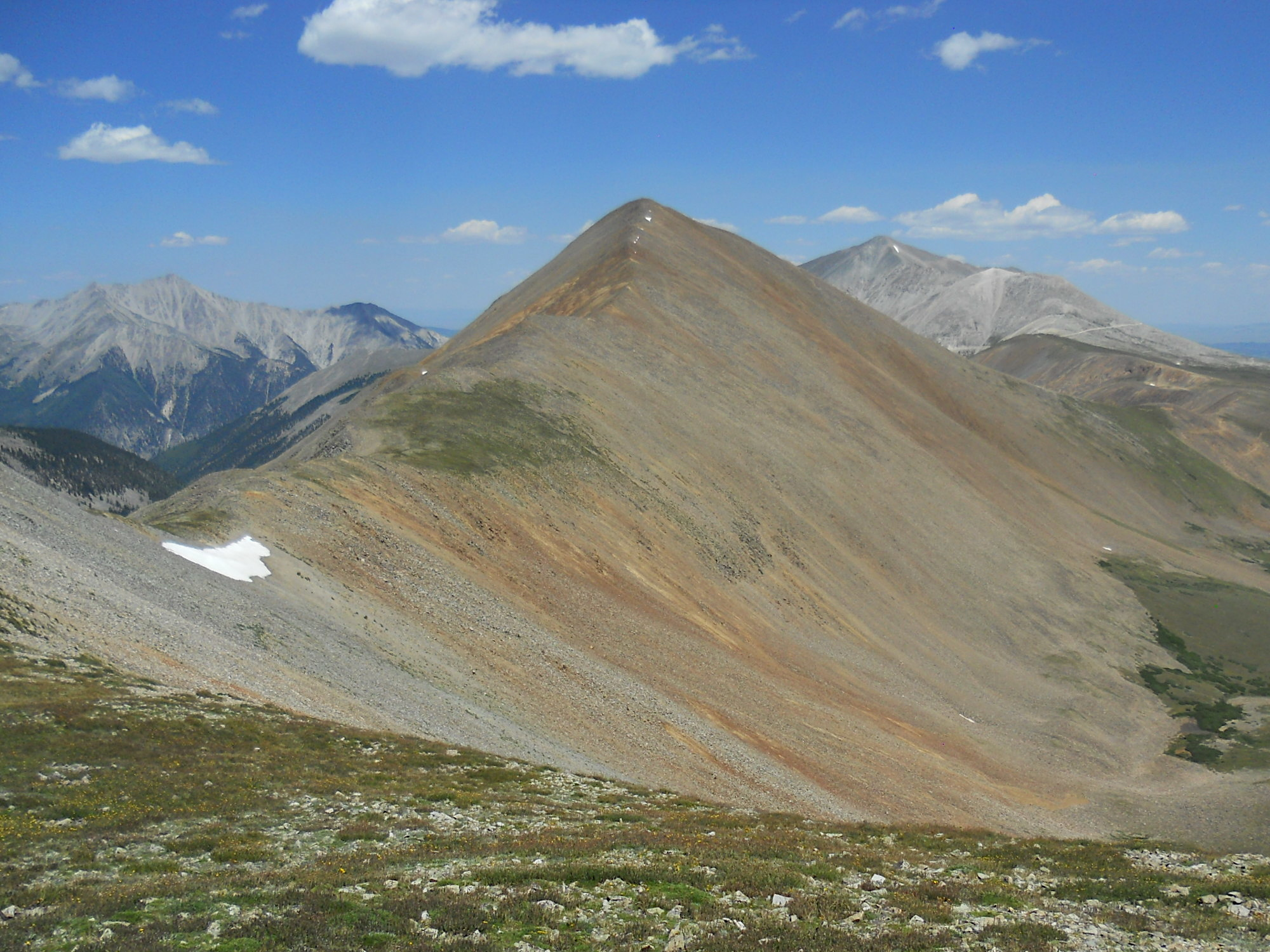
- Cronin Peak viewed from the southwest

Highest point
- Elevation: 13,877 ft (4,230 m)
- Prominence: 1,050 ft (320 m)
- Isolation: 2.39 mi (3.85 km)
- Coordinates: 38°39′20″N 106°17′00″W

Geography
- Location within Colorado
- Location: Chaffee County, Colorado, U.S.
- Parent range: Sawatch Range
- Topo map(s): USGS 7.5' topographic map Saint Elmo, Colorado

Cronin Peak is a high mountain summit in the southern Sawatch Range of the Rocky Mountains of North America. The 13,877-foot (4,230 m) thirteener is located in San Isabel National Forest, 12.9 miles (20.8 km) southwest by west (bearing 241°) of the community of Nathrop in Chaffee County, Colorado, United States. Cronin Peak was named in honor of Mary Cronin, who in 1934 become the first woman to climb all 53 Colorado fourteeners.

== See also ==
- List of Colorado mountain ranges
- List of Colorado mountain summits
  - List of Colorado fourteeners
  - List of Colorado 4000 meter prominent summits
  - List of the most prominent summits of Colorado
- List of Colorado county high points
