= Nathrop, Colorado =

Census-designated place in Chaffee County, CO, USA

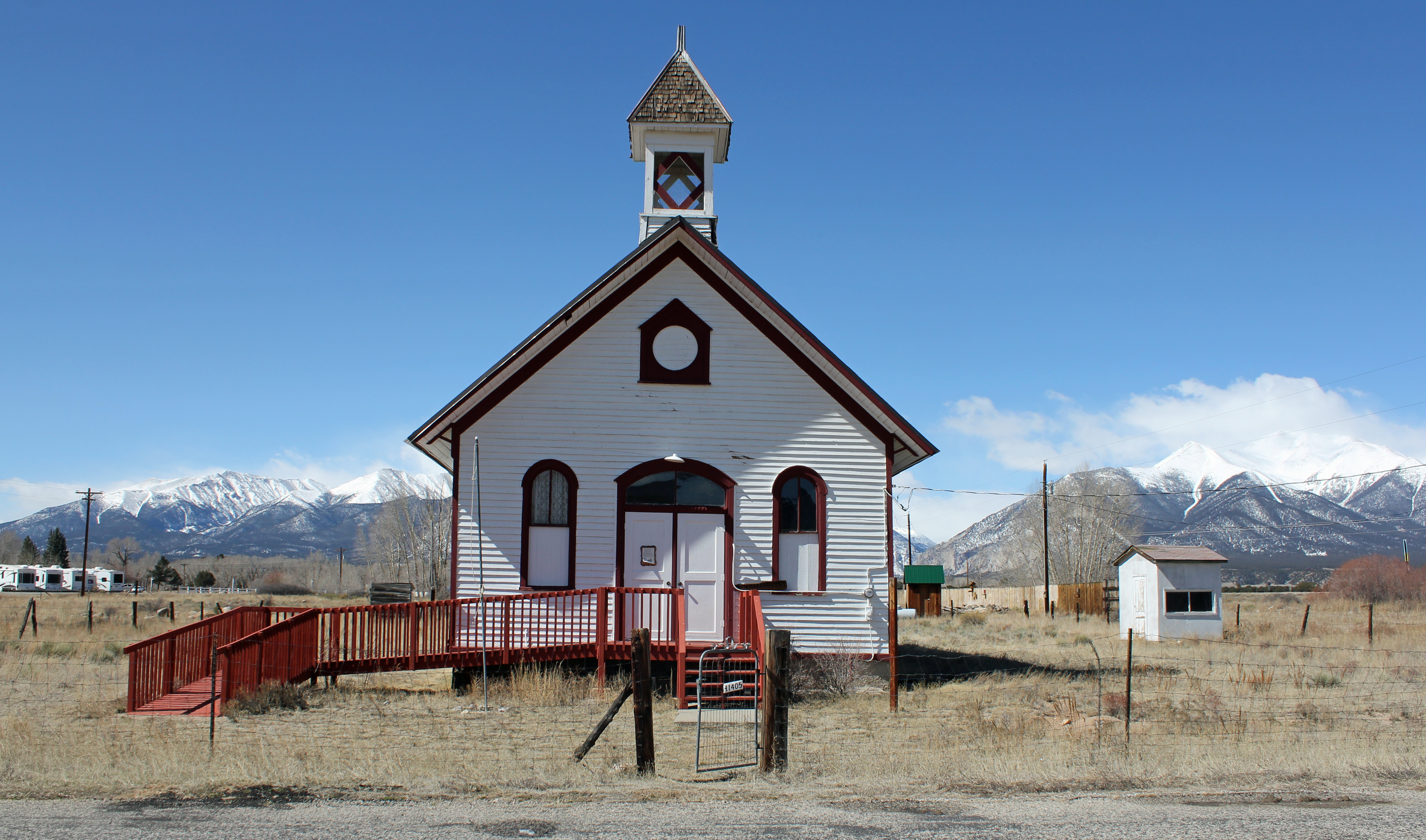
- An old school in Nathrop.

- Location of the Nathrop CDP in the State of Colorado
- Coordinates: 38°45′05″N 106°04′39″W
- Country: United States
- State: Colorado
- County: Chaffee

Government
  - Type: Unincorporated town

Area
  - Total: 1.873 km^{2} (0.723 sq mi)
  - Land: 1.873 km^{2} (0.723 sq mi)
  - Water: 0.000 km^{2} (0 sq mi)
- Elevation: 2,343 m (7,687 ft)

Population (2020)
  - Total: 288
  - Density: 154/km^{2} (398/sq mi)
- Time zone: UTC-7 (MST)
  - Summer (DST): UTC-6 (MDT)
- ZIP Code: 81236
- Area code: 719
- GNIS feature ID: 2805910

Nathrop is an unincorporated town, a post office, and a census-designated place (CDP) located in and governed by Chaffee County, Colorado, United States. The population was 288 at the 2020 census. The Nathrop post office has the ZIP code 81236.

== History ==
Nathrop was named for Charles Nachtrieb, owner of the townsite. In 1880, the Denver and Rio Grande Railroad built through Nathrop as part of their Tennessee Pass line. The tracks were placed out of service in 1997, but Union Pacific, present-day owner of the line, may reach an agreement to reopen it.

== Geography ==
The Nathrop CDP has an area of 463 acres (1.873 km^{2}), all land.

=== Ruby Mountain ===
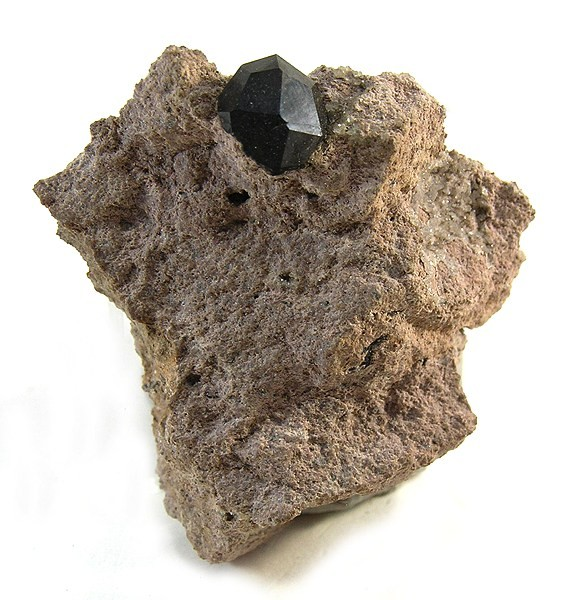
Spessartine-49374

Ruby Mountain is a rhyolite outcrop located about one mile northeast of Nathrop. Small spessartite garnet crystals are found throughout the outcropping. Small pebbles of black obsidian referred to as "Apache tears" by collectors can also be found in the talus rock at the base of the cliffs.

== Demographics ==
The United States Census Bureau defined the Nathrop CDP for the United States Census 2020.

Nathrop CDP, Colorado
Year	Pop.	±%
2020	288	—
Source: United States Census Bureau

== Attractions ==
- Alpine Tunnel
- Arkansas Headwaters Recreation Area
- Browns Canyon National Monument
- Mount Princeton
- San Isabel National Forest
- St. Elmo

== See also ==
- Arkansas Headwaters Recreation Area
- Browns Canyon National Monument
