= Ogden Tweto =

Ogden Tweto (1912 - 1983) created the now-classic Geologic Map of Colorado which is held as one of the finest examples of a state geologic map.

Tweto received awards including the Distinguished Service Award of the Department of the Interior (1970) and the Scientist of the Year Award by the Rocky Mountain Association of Geologists (1978). While working in Leadville, Colorado, he discovered features dating to the Proterozoic. He is also known for his work involving the Arapahoe Formation, the Leadville Mining District, and the Colorado Mineral Belt.

In 1986, Mount Tweto near Leadville was named in his honor.
