= Arkansas Headwaters Recreation Area =

State park in the U.S. state of Colorado

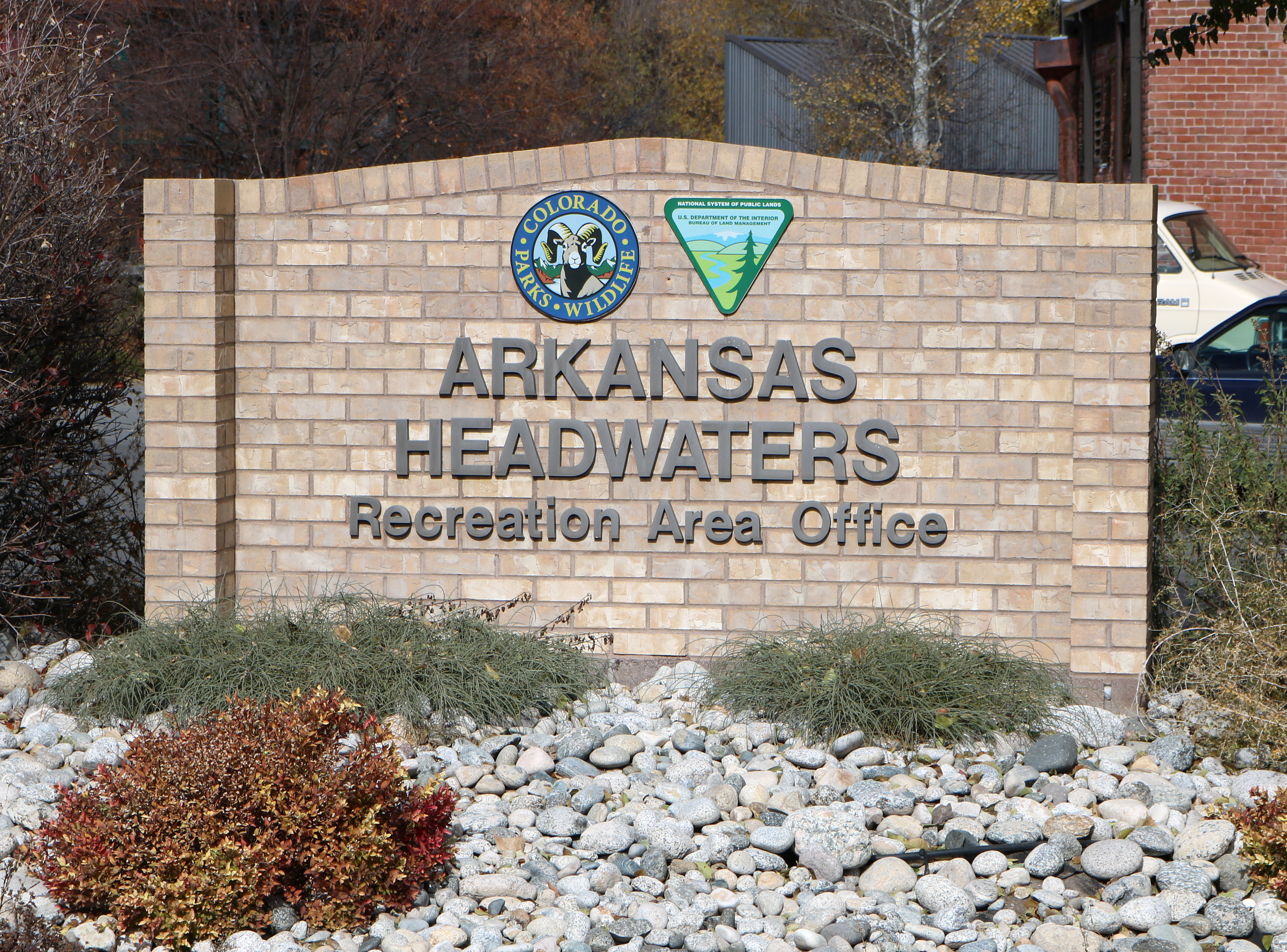
- Recreation Area office sign in Salida

- Location within Colorado
- Location: Chaffee / Fremont / Lake / Pueblo counties, Colorado, USA
- Nearest city: Salida, Colorado
- Coordinates: 38°32′16″N 105°59′33″W
- Area: 6,193 acres (25.06 km^{2})
- Established: 1998
- Visitors: 1.2 million (in 2023)
- Governing body: Colorado Parks and Wildlife; Bureau of Land Management; United States Forest Service

The Arkansas Headwaters Recreation Area (AHRA) is a state park in Colorado, U.S. The park is jointly administered by Colorado Parks and Wildlife, the Bureau of Land Management, and the United States Forest Service. The park's joint headquarters and visitor center is in Salida, Colorado.

== Geography ==
The recreation area stretches along the Arkansas River for approximately 148 miles (238 kilometers) from Leadville, Colorado to the Pueblo Reservoir near Pueblo West, Colorado. The area includes more than 25 developed recreation sites and fishing easements along the river adjacent to U.S. Highway 24 / U.S. Highway 285 and adjacent to U.S. Highway 50. The recreation area includes sections in and near the Colorado towns of Buena Vista, Salida, Cañon City and Florence. The recreation area includes parts of Browns Canyon National Monument, established in 2015. The national monument is accessible through the recreation area's Ruby Mountain and Hecla Junction river sites. In a 152-mile (245-kilometer) stretch that includes the recreation area, the Arkansas River decreases 4,650 feet (1,420 meters) in elevation.

== Activities ==
Chief among the activities available in the park is whitewater rafting down the Arkansas River. Most river rafters choose to hire local commercial outfitters to supply rafts and guides to manage their rafting trips. The recreation area is one of the country's most popular rafting sites. The rapids range from Class II to Class V. Additional activities include fishing, picnicking, hiking, wildlife viewing, horseback riding, mountain biking, camping and OHV riding. Other activities include kayaking, boating, gold panning, rock climbing, snowmobiling, and ice fishing.

== Fees ==
Visitors are subject to Colorado State Park Fees. As of 2024, the fees are $10 per day per vehicle and $4 per day per person for any non-vehicle access to the recreation area (for example, walking, bicycling, riding a horse). Yearly passes are also available for purchase. The area includes about six established campgrounds, and dispersed camping is allowed in some areas with certain restrictions. Camping fees are charged in addition to visitor fees.
