= Tennessee Creek (Missouri) =

Stream in the American state of Missouri

Coordinates: 38.515569°N 94.356615°W

Tennessee Creek is a stream in Cass County in the U.S. state of Missouri.

Tennessee Creek was named for the fact that a share of the pioneer settlers in the area came from the state of Tennessee.

== See also ==
- List of rivers of Missouri
