= Apishapa River =

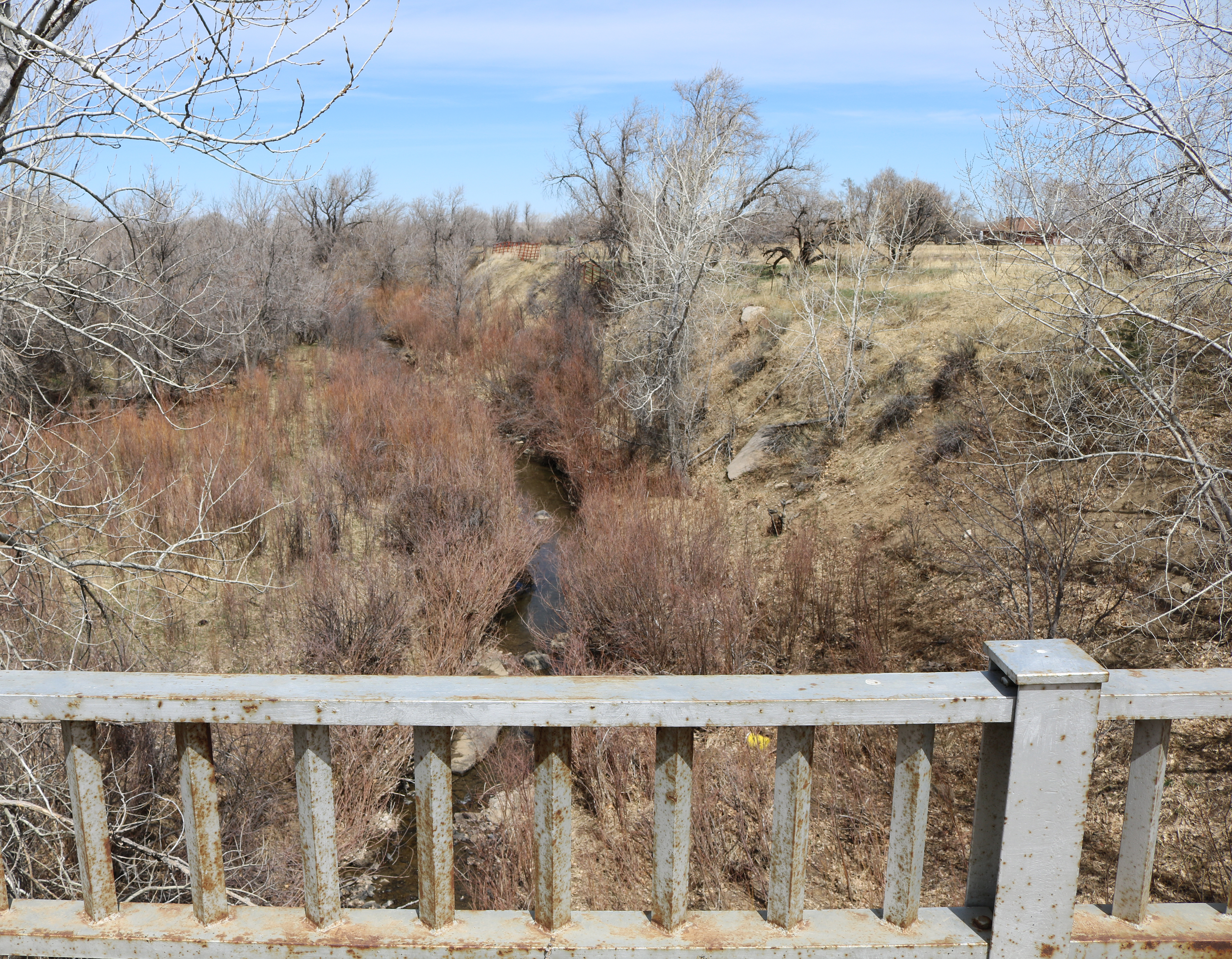
- The river at Aguilar, Colorado.

Physical characteristics
- Source
  - coordinates: 37°21′12″N 105°01′04″W
- Mouth
  - location: Confluence with Arkansas
  - coordinates: 38°07′40″N 103°56′57″W
  - elevation: 4,268 ft (1,301 m)
- Basin size: 1,080 mi^{2} (2,800 km^{2})

Basin features
- Progression: Arkansas—Mississippi

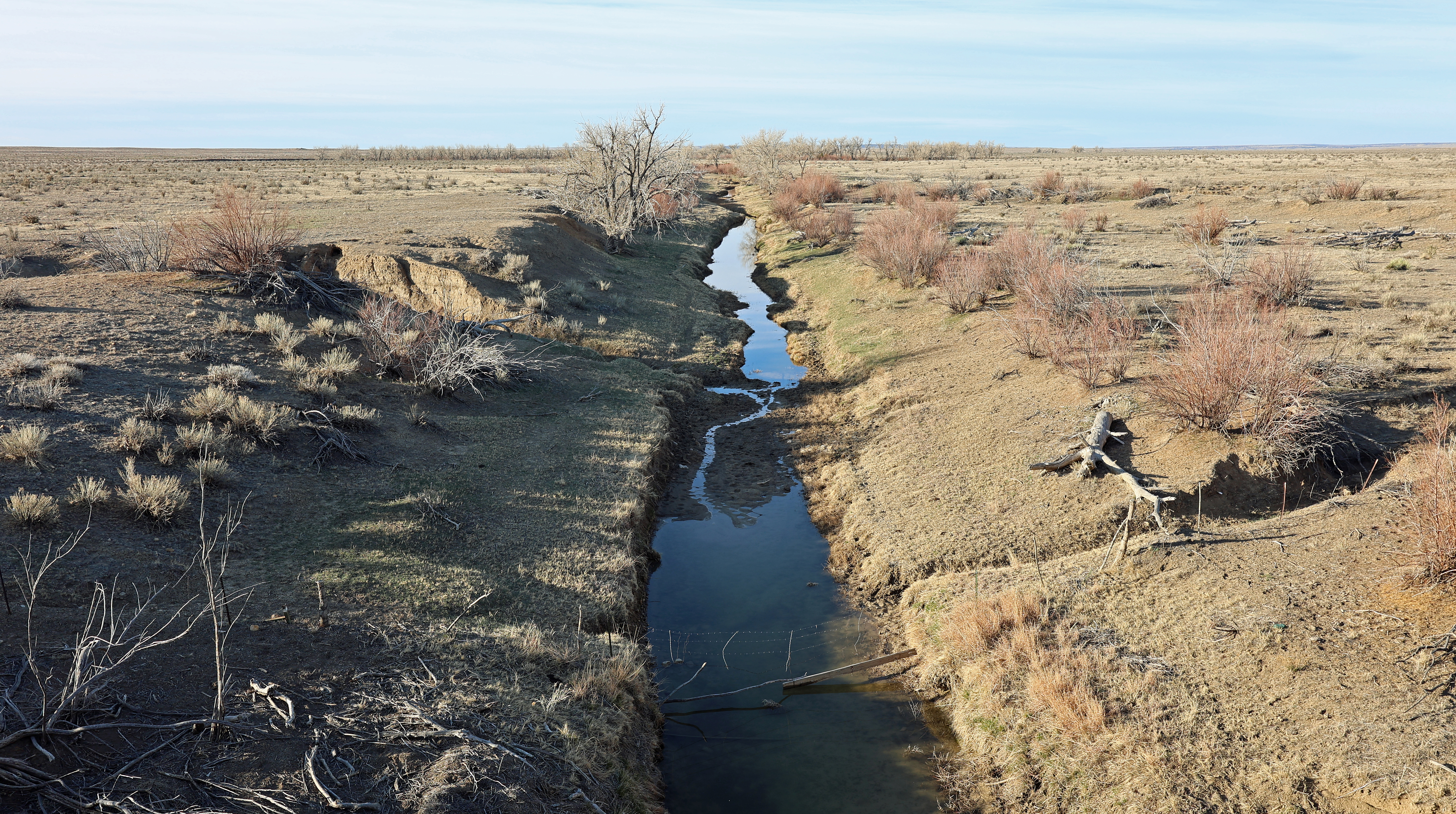
The river near Colorado State Highway 10

Apishapa River is a 139-mile-long (224 km) tributary of the Arkansas River that flows from a source near West Spanish Peak in southern Colorado. It joins the Arkansas east of Fowler, Colorado. A U.S. Geological Survey (USGS) station, #07119500, located along this river near Fowler measures the river's discharge.

The level and salinity levels of the Apishapa River are monitored by gaging stations installed at three locations along the headwaters of the river in 2007.

== See also ==
- List of rivers of Colorado
