= Tennessee Creek (Mississippi) =

Stream in Mississippi, United States

Coordinates: 30.9399078°N 88.4525161°W

Tennessee Creek is a stream in the U.S. state of Mississippi.

The name "Tennessee Creek" is derived from the Cherokee village Tanasi.
