= Mount Buckskin =

Mountain in the state of Colorado

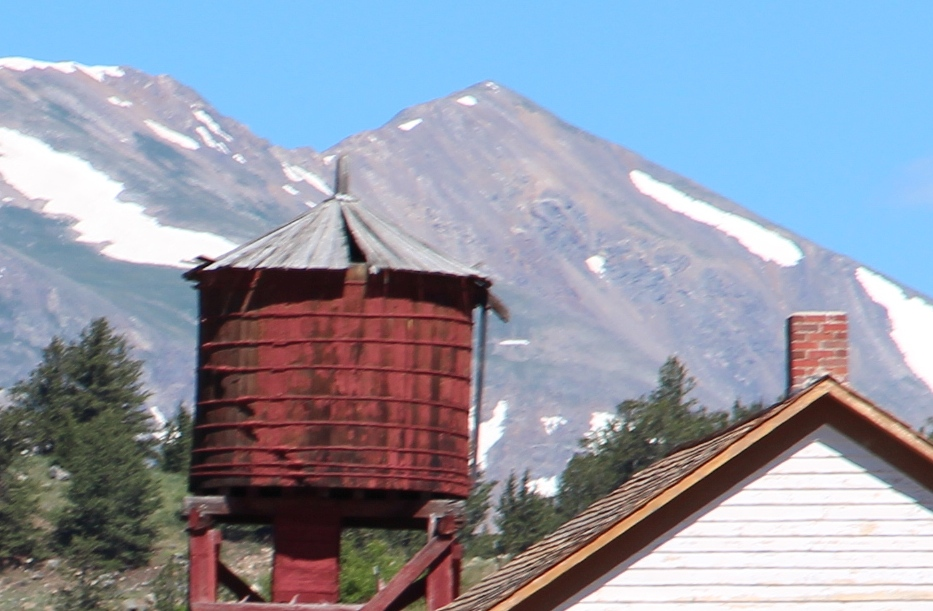
- Mount Buckskin viewed from Fairplay

Highest point
- Elevation: 13,872 ft (4,228 m)
- Prominence: 679 ft (207 m)
- Isolation: 1.49 mi (2.40 km)
- Coordinates: 39°19′07″N 106°08′50″W

Geography
- Location within Colorado
- Location: Park County, Colorado, U.S.
- Parent range: Mosquito Range
- Topo map(s): USGS 7.5' topographic map Climax, Colorado

Mount Buckskin is a high mountain summit in the Mosquito Range of the Rocky Mountains of North America. The 13,872-foot (4,228 m) thirteener is located in Pike National Forest, 4.9 miles (7.9 km) west-northwest (bearing 297°) of the Town of Alma in Park County, Colorado, United States.

== See also ==
- List of Colorado mountain ranges
- List of Colorado mountain summits
  - List of Colorado fourteeners
  - List of Colorado 4000 meter prominent summits
  - List of the most prominent summits of Colorado
- List of Colorado county high points
