= Tennessee Creek (Arkansas River tributary) =

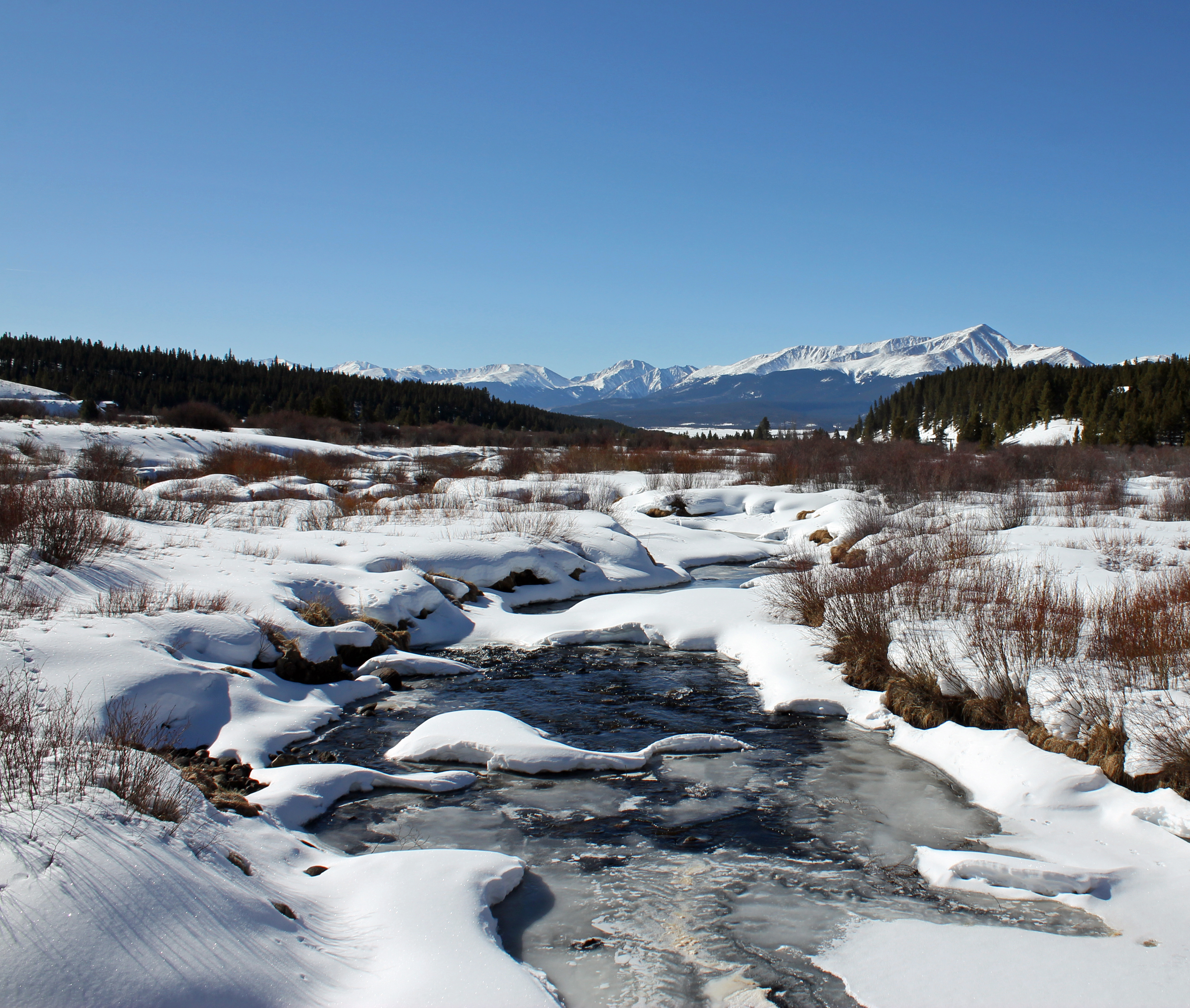
- The creek just after it goes under Lake County Road 9. Its confluence with the East Fork Arkansas River, where the Arkansas River begins, is about 100 yards in front of the camera.

Physical characteristics
- Source
  - location: Lake County, Colorado
  - coordinates: 39°21′43″N 106°18′28″W
- Mouth
  - location: Confluence with East Fork Arkansas River
  - coordinates: 39°15′30″N 106°20′37″W
  - elevation: 9,728 ft (2,965 m)

Basin features
- Progression: Arkansas—Mississippi

Tennessee Creek is a stream in Lake County, Colorado. It rises on the south side of Tennessee Pass near the Eagle County-Lake County line.

The creek joins with the East Fork Arkansas River northwest of Leadville to form the Arkansas River. At the confluence of Tennessee Creek and East Fork Arkansas River, the river that bears only the name "Arkansas River" begins.

== See also ==
- List of rivers of Colorado
- List of tributaries of the Colorado River
