= East Fork Arkansas River =

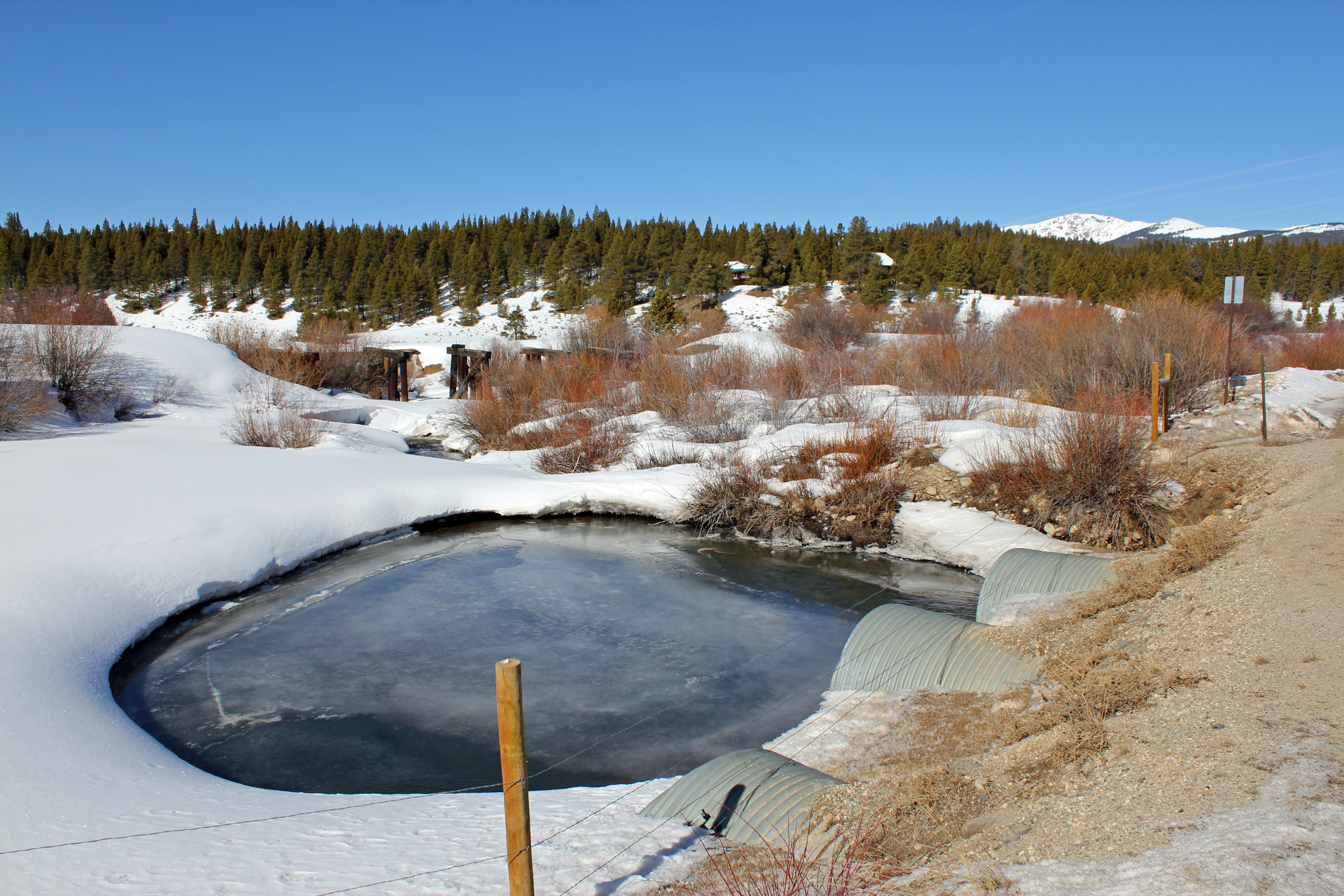
- The East Fork just after it goes under County Road 9 and just before it merges with Tennessee Creek to form the Arkansas River.

Physical characteristics
- Source
  - location: Mosquito Range
  - coordinates: 39°19′38″N 106°09′56″W
  - elevation: 13,200 ft (4,000 m)
- Mouth
  - location: Confluence with Arkansas
  - coordinates: 39°15′25″N 106°20′38″W
  - elevation: 9,728 ft (2,965 m)

Basin features
- Progression: Arkansas—Mississippi

East Fork Arkansas River is a 20.6-mile-long (33.2 km) tributary of the Arkansas River that flows from a source on Mount Arkansas in the Mosquito Range of central Colorado. It joins with Tennessee Creek to form the Arkansas River west of Leadville, Colorado.

== See also ==
- List of rivers of Colorado
