= Browns Canyon National Monument =

National Monument in Chaffee County, Colorado, United States

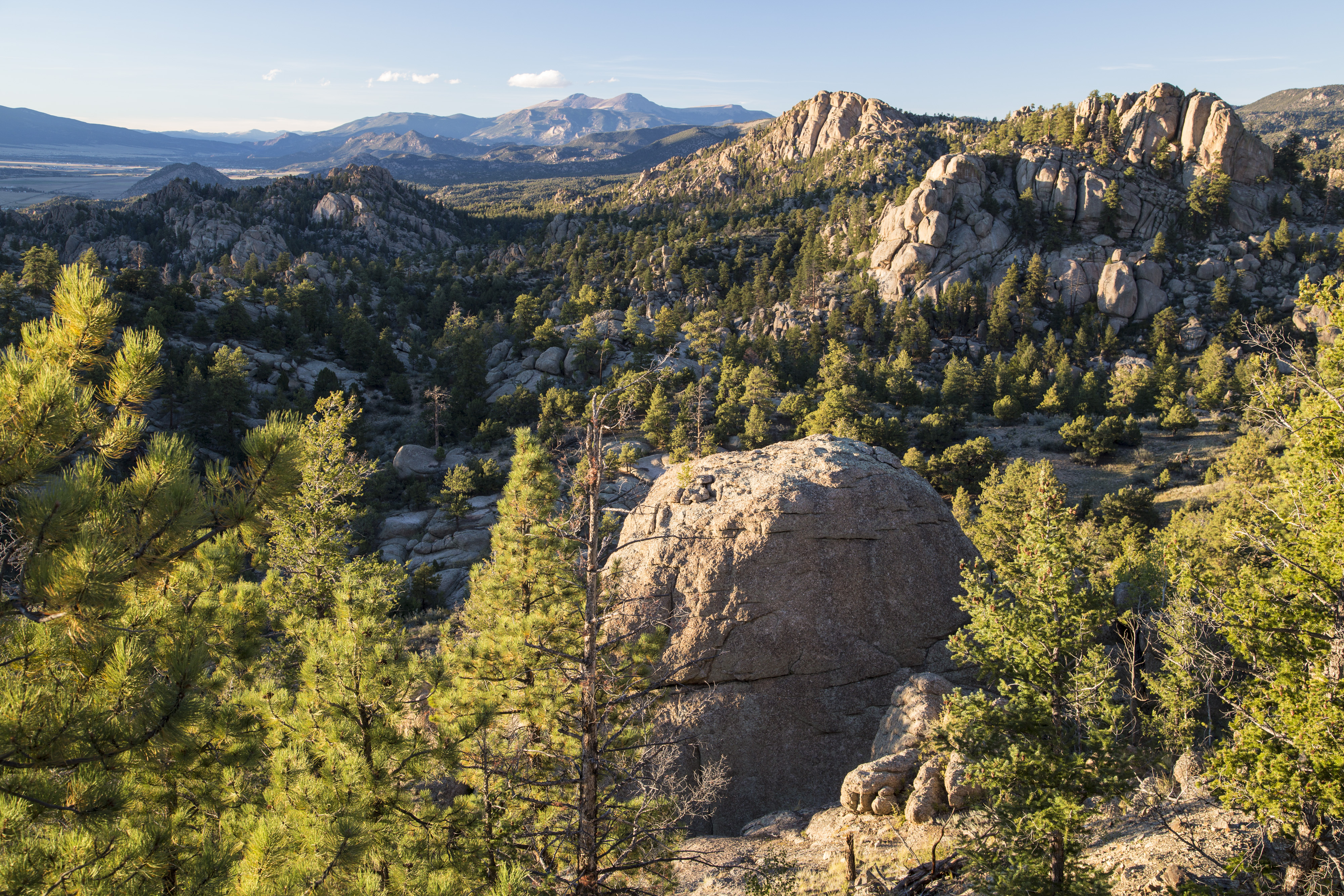
- Rock outcroppings in Browns Canyon

- Location within the United States Location within Colorado
- Location: Chaffee County, Colorado, USA
- Nearest city: Salida, Colorado
- Coordinates: 38.6119°N 106.0600°W
- Area: 21,586 acres (8,736 ha)
- Authorized: February 19, 2015
- Governing body: Bureau of Land Management and U.S. Forest Service
- Website: Browns Canyon National Monument

Browns Canyon National Monument is a 21,586 acres (87 km^{2}) national monument in Chaffee County, Colorado, that was designated as such by President Barack Obama under the Antiquities Act on February 19, 2015. The site will be centered along the Arkansas River between Buena Vista and Salida. Browns Canyon is the most popular destination for whitewater rafting in the country, and is also known for its fishing and hiking. The monument will provide habitat protection for bighorn sheep, peregrine falcons, elk, and golden eagles.

Designation of the monument was requested by numerous Colorado lawmakers, including Senators Michael Bennet and Mark Udall, Representative Joel Hefley and Governor John Hickenlooper. It was opposed by Representatives Ken Buck and Doug Lamborn, who objected to the president's use of executive action in declaring the monument. Lamborn also objected to the effect that the monument's creation would have on grazing, mineral and water rights; in response, the White House stated that the designation would honor "valid and existing rights, but withdraws the area from future mineral leasing."

The monument is run jointly by the Bureau of Land Management and United States Forest Service.

== History ==
In 1972, the Forest Service completed the original Roadless Area Review and Evaluation (RARE I), identifying Inventoried roadless areas. RARE I determined that all U.S. Forest Service lands within Browns Canyon and surrounding areas, tens of thousands of acres, were suitable to be designated as wilderness. In 1976, the BLM, as directed by the Federal Land Policy and Management Act, proposed protection of Browns Canyon for primitive values, initiating a review for wilderness designation. In 1979, the Forest Service completed the RARE II process, identifying 23,500 acres of Forest Service land near Browns Canyon as roadless. Also in 1979, the BLM identified 6,614 acres in and around Browns Canyon as possessing wilderness characteristics. The BLM officially designated 7,451 acres as a wilderness study area in 1993.

The Colorado Wilderness Act of 1991, introduced by Representatives Wayne Allard and Dan Schaefer, would have named hundreds of thousands of acres in the state as wilderness, including the Browns Canyon area, but the bill never passed beyond the committee stage. In 2005, Joel Hefley and six other Colorado lawmakers introduced the Browns Canyon Wilderness Act; a companion bill was introduced in the Senate by Wayne Allard. The legislation failed due to the influence of the National Rifle Association of America, which claimed that a wilderness designation would limit hunting in Browns Canyon. An attempt to reintroduce the Act by Senator Ken Salazar once again failed to clear its committee. Mark Udall and Michael Bennet attempted to introduce legislation designating the canyon as a national monument in 2013, but it, too, failed. Udall's bill also contained over 10,000 acres (4,000 ha) of wilderness protections, which are not included in the proclamation, as such protections may only be enacted by Congress. The monument as designated otherwise substantially follows the acreage designated in the bill.

== See also ==
- Bibliography of Colorado
- Geography of Colorado
- History of Colorado
- Index of Colorado-related articles
- List of Colorado-related lists
- List of national monuments of the United States
- Outline of Colorado
