= Arkansas River =

Major tributary of the Mississippi River, United States

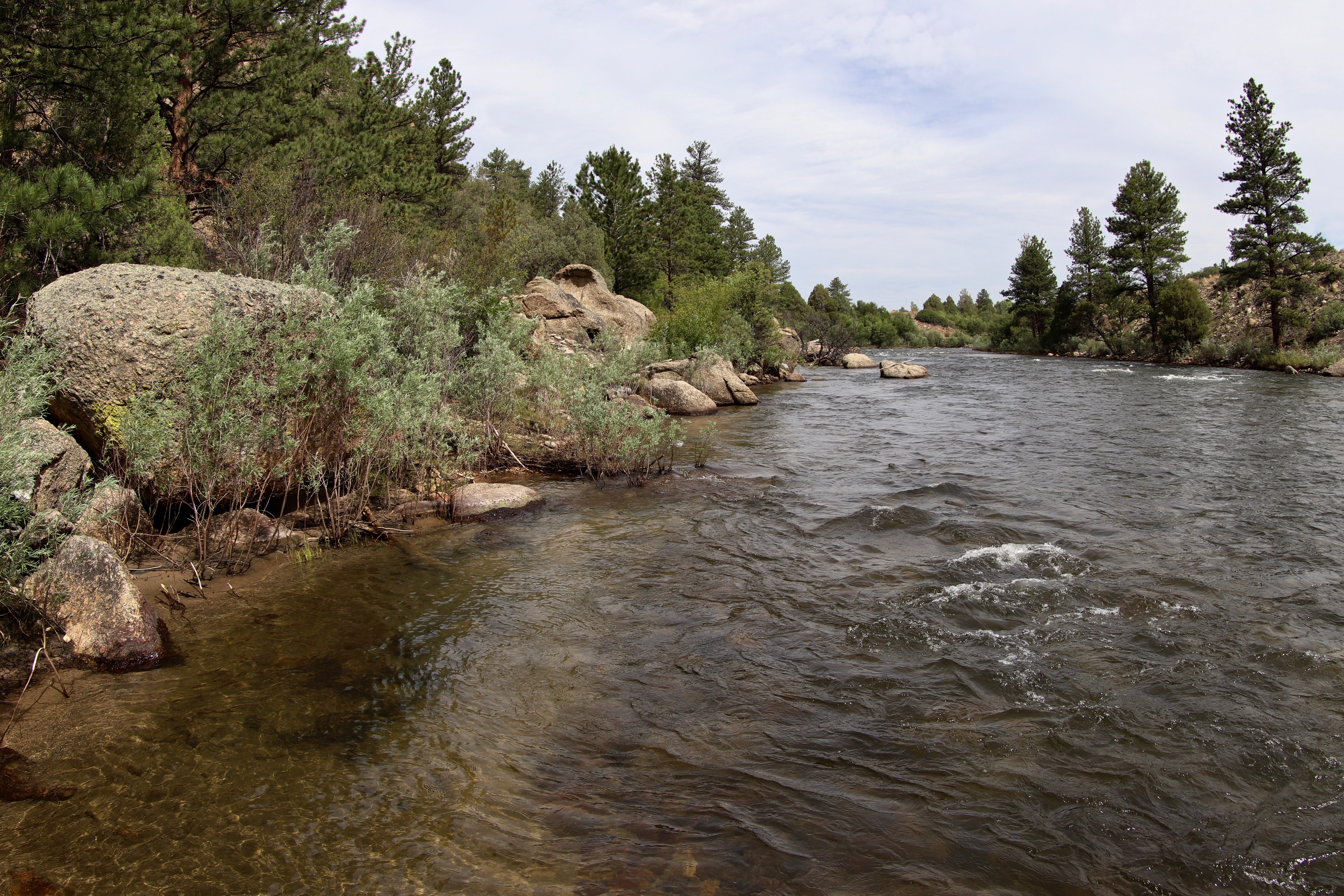
- Arkansas River headwaters in Colorado

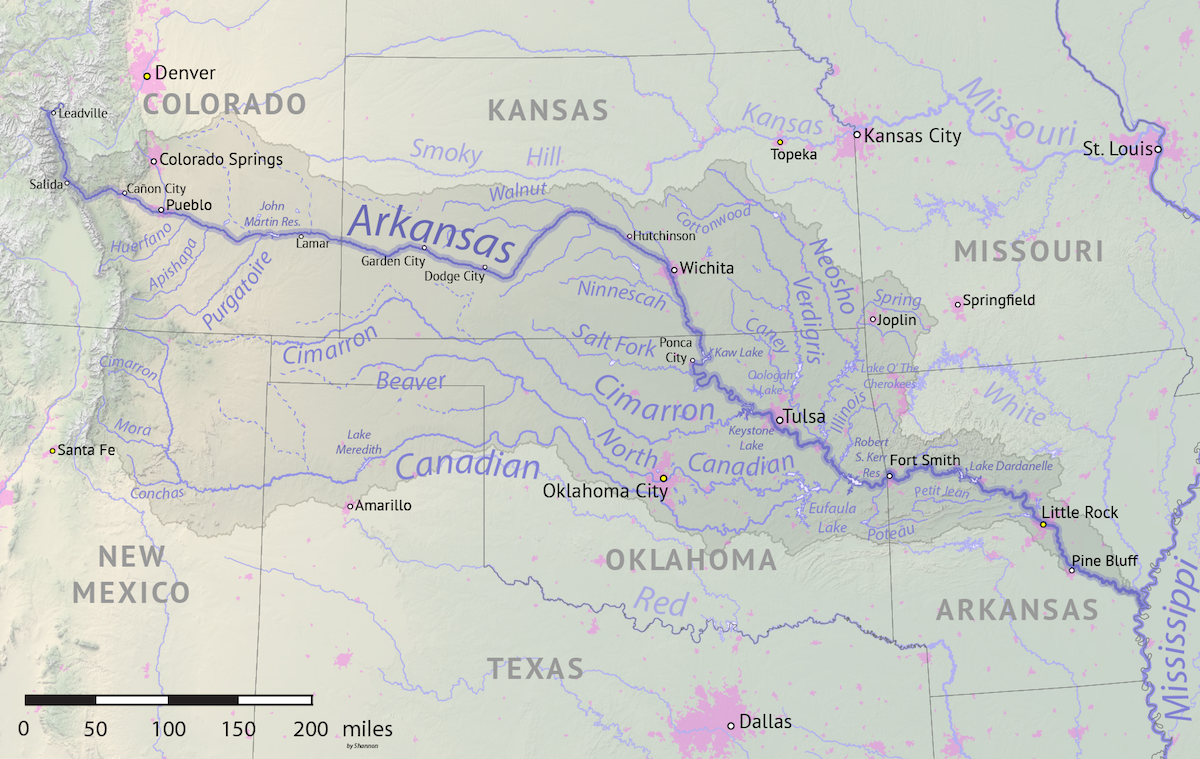
- The Arkansas River flows through Colorado, Kansas, Oklahoma, and Arkansas, and its watershed also drains parts of Texas, New Mexico and Missouri.

Location
- Country: United States
- State: Colorado, Kansas, Oklahoma, Arkansas
- Region: Great Plains
- Cities: Pueblo, CO, Wichita, KS, Tulsa, OK, Muskogee, OK, Fort Smith, AR, Little Rock, AR, Pine Bluff, AR

Physical characteristics
- Source: Confluence of East Fork Arkansas River and Tennessee Creek
  - location: Near Leadville, Rocky Mountains, Colorado
  - coordinates: 39°15′30″N 106°20′38″W
  - elevation: 9,728 ft (2,965 m)
- Mouth: Mississippi River
  - location: Franklin Township, Desha County, near Napoleon, Arkansas
  - coordinates: 33°46′30″N 91°6′30″W
  - elevation: 108 ft (33 m)
- Length: 1,469 mi (2,364 km), West-east
- Basin size: 168,000 sq mi (440,000 km^{2})
- Discharge
  - location: Little Rock, AR
  - average: 39,850 cu ft/s (1,128 m^{3}/s)
  - minimum: 1,141 cu ft/s (32.3 m^{3}/s)
  - maximum: 536,000 cu ft/s (15,200 m^{3}/s)

Basin features
- River system: Mississippi River watershed
- Tributaries
  - left: Fountain Creek, Pawnee River, Little Arkansas River, Walnut River, Verdigris River, Neosho River
  - right: Cimarron River, Salt Fork Arkansas River, La Flecha, Canadian River, Poteau River

The Arkansas River is a major tributary of the Mississippi River. It generally flows to the east and southeast as it traverses the U.S. states of Colorado, Kansas, Oklahoma, and Arkansas. The river's source basin lies in Colorado, specifically the Arkansas River Valley. The headwaters derive from the snowpack in the Sawatch and Mosquito mountain ranges. It flows east into Kansas and finally through Oklahoma and Arkansas, where it meets the Mississippi River.

At 1,469 miles (2,364 km), it is the sixth-longest river in the United States, the second-longest tributary in the Mississippi–Missouri system, and the 47th longest river in the world. Its origin is in the Rocky Mountains in Lake County, Colorado, near Leadville. In 1859, placer gold discovered in the Leadville area brought thousands seeking to strike it rich, but the easily recovered placer gold was quickly exhausted. The Arkansas River's mouth is at Napoleon, Arkansas, and its drainage basin covers nearly 170,000 square miles (440,000 km^{2}). Its volume is much smaller than the Missouri and Ohio rivers, with a mean discharge of about 40,000 cubic feet per second (1,100 m^{3}/s).

The Arkansas from its headwaters to the 100th meridian west formed part of the U.S.–Mexico border from the Adams–Onís Treaty (in force 1821) until the Texas Annexation or Treaty of Guadalupe Hidalgo.

== Pronunciations ==
The river is pronounced /ɑːrˈkænzəs/ ar-KAN-zəs in Kansas, and /ˈɑːrkənsɔː/ AR-kən-saw in the other three states that it crosses.

== Physical geography ==
=== Course changes ===
The path of the Arkansas River has changed over time. Sediments from the river found in a palaeochannel next to Nolan, a site in the Tensas Basin, show that part of the river's meander belt flowed through that area up to 3200 BCE. While it was previously thought that this relict channel was active at the same time as another relict of the Mississippi River's meander belt, it has been shown that this channel of the Arkansas was inactive approximately 400 years before the Mississippi channel was active.

=== Hydrography ===
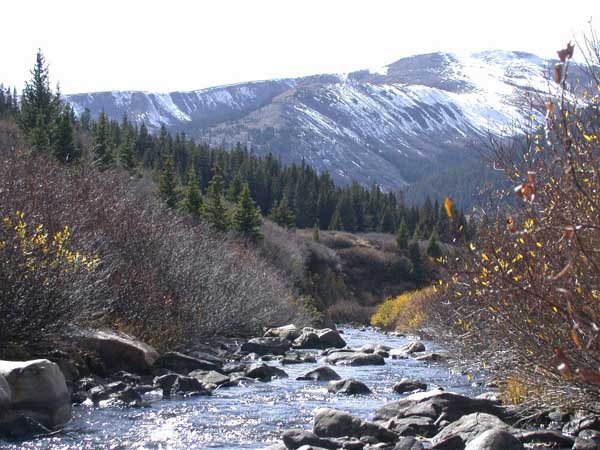
The headwaters of the Arkansas near Leadville, Colorado

The Arkansas has three distinct sections in its long path through central North America. At its headwaters beginning near Leadville, Colorado, the Arkansas runs as a steep fast-flowing mountain river through the Rockies in its narrow valley, dropping 4,600 feet (1,400 m) in 120 miles (190 km). This section supports extensive whitewater rafting, including The Numbers (near Granite, Colorado), Brown's Canyon, and the Royal Gorge.

At Cañon City, Colorado, the Arkansas River valley widens and flattens markedly. Just west of Pueblo, Colorado, the river enters the Great Plains. Through the rest of Colorado, Kansas, and much of Oklahoma, it is a typical Great Plains riverway, with wide, shallow banks subject to seasonal flooding and periods of dwindling flow. Tributaries include the Cimarron and the Salt Fork Arkansas rivers.

In eastern Oklahoma, the river begins to widen further into a more contained consistent channel. To maintain more reliable flow rates, a series of dams and large reservoir lakes have been built on the Arkansas and its intersecting tributaries, including the Canadian, Verdigris, Neosho (Grand), Illinois, and Poteau rivers. These locks and dams enable the river to be navigable by barges and large river craft downriver of Muskogee, Oklahoma, where the McClellan-Kerr Arkansas River Navigation System joins the Verdigris River.

Into western Arkansas, the river path works between the encroaching Boston and Ouachita mountains, including many isolated, flat-topped mesas, buttes, or monadnocks such as Mount Nebo, Petit Jean Mountain, and Mount Magazine, the highest point in the state. The river valley expands as it encounters much flatter land beginning just west of Little Rock, Arkansas. It continues eastward across the plains and forests of eastern Arkansas until it flows into the Mississippi River near Napoleon, Arkansas.

Water flow in the Arkansas River (as measured in central Kansas) has dropped from approximately 248 cubic feet per second (7.0 m^{3}/s) average from 1944–1963 to 53 cubic feet per second (1.5 m^{3}/s) average from 1984–2003, largely because of the pumping of groundwater for irrigation in eastern Colorado and western Kansas.

Important cities along the Arkansas River include Canon City, Pueblo, La Junta, and Lamar, Colorado; Garden City, Dodge City, Hutchinson, and Wichita, Kansas; Tulsa, Oklahoma; and Fort Smith and Little Rock, Arkansas.

The May 2002 I-40 bridge disaster took place on I-40's crossing of Kerr Reservoir on the Arkansas River near Webbers Falls, Oklahoma.

=== Table of primary tributaries ===
Waterway	Orientation	Length	Mouth coordinates	Mouth altitude	Mouth location	Source coordinates	Source location
East Fork Arkansas River	left	21 mi (33 km)	39°15′25″N 106°20′38″W	9,718 ft (2,962 m)	Leadville, Colorado	39°19′38″N 106°09′56″W	Lake County, Colorado
Lake Creek	right	14 mi (23 km)	39°04′41″N 106°16′52″W	9,036 ft (2,754 m)	Lake County, Colorado	39°03′57″N 106°30′00″W	Chaffee County, Colorado
Chalk Creek	right	27 mi (44 km)	38°44′27″N 106°04′00″W	7,605 ft (2,318 m)	Chaffee County, Colorado	38°36′20″N 106°21′32″W	Gunnison County, Colorado
South Arkansas River	right	24 mi (39 km)	38°31′16″N 105°58′40″W	6,989 ft (2,130 m)	Chaffee County, Colorado	38°29′53″N 106°19′53″W	Chaffee County, Colorado
Hardscrabble Creek	right	19 mi (30 km)	38°23′53″N 105°01′42″W	5,046 ft (1,538 m)	Fremont County, Colorado	38°11′13″N 105°06′13″W	Custer County, Colorado
Fountain Creek	left	75 mi (120 km)	38°15′15″N 104°35′20″W	4,636 ft (1,413 m)	Pueblo, Colorado	38°59′48″N 105°01′44″W	El Paso County, Colorado
Saint Charles River	right	65 mi (104 km)	38°15′56″N 104°28′11″W	4,551 ft (1,387 m)	Custer County, Colorado	37°59′53″N 105°09′00″W	Pueblo County, Colorado
Chico Creek	left	54 mi (87 km)	38°14′33″N 104°21′57″W	4,505 ft (1,373 m)	Pueblo County, Colorado	38°45′50″N 104°33′14″W	El Paso County, Colorado
Huerfano River	right	113 mi (182 km)	38°13′43″N 104°14′45″W	4,442 ft (1,354 m)	Pueblo County, Colorado	37°35′50″N 105°29′40″W	Huerfano County, Colorado
Apishapa River	right	139 mi (224 km)	38°07′40″N 103°56′57″W	4,269 ft (1,301 m)	Olney Springs, Colorado	37°21′12″N 105°01′04″W	Huerfano County, Colorado
Horse Creek	left	129 mi (208 km)	38°04′12″N 103°19′12″W	3,944 ft (1,202 m)	Otero County, Colorado	38°59′32″N 104°18′59″W	El Paso County, Colorado
Purgatoire River	right	196 mi (315 km)	38°03′54″N 103°10′37″W	3,862 ft (1,177 m)	Bent County, Colorado	37°09′26″N 104°56′27″W	Las Animas County, Colorado
Two Butte Creek	right	152 mi (245 km)	38°02′33″N 102°07′33″W	3,389 ft (1,033 m)	Prowers County, Colorado	37°16′11″N 103°20′31″W	Las Animas County, Colorado
Bear Creek	right	160 mi (260 km)	37°50′42″N 101°19′21″W	3,038 ft (926 m)	Kearny County, Kansas	37°22′05″N 102°59′59″W	Baca County, Colorado
Pawnee River	left	198 mi (319 km)	38°10′07″N 99°05′45″W	1,988 ft (606 m)	Larned, Kansas	37°57′57″N 100°35′55″W	Gray County, Kansas
Rattlesnake Creek	right	95 mi (153 km)	38°12′53″N 98°21′01″W	1,732 ft (528 m)	Stafford County, Kansas	37°28′30″N 99°46′35″W	Ford County, Kansas
Cow Creek	left	110 mi (180 km)	37°58′47″N 97°50′24″W	1,480 ft (450 m)	Hutchinson, Kansas	38°38′37″N 98°39′10″W	Barton County, Kansas
Little Arkansas River	left	128 mi (206 km)	37°41′29″N 97°20′57″W	1,283 ft (391 m)	Sedgwick County, Kansas	38°31′46″N 98°09′18″W	Rice County, Kansas
Ninnescah River	right	57 mi (91 km)	37°19′17″N 97°09′59″W	1,152 ft (351 m)	Sumner County, Kansas	37°34′05″N 97°42′19″W	Sedgwick County, Kansas
Walnut River	left	154 mi (248 km)	37°02′57″N 97°00′02″W	1,043 ft (318 m)	Cowley County, Kansas	38°01′17″N 96°33′12″W	Butler County, Kansas
Grouse Creek	left	75 mi (120 km)	37°00′12″N 96°55′19″W	1,027 ft (313 m)	Cowley County, Kansas	37°35′02″N 96°32′05″W	Butler County, Kansas
Salt Fork Arkansas River	right	239 mi (385 km)	36°35′58″N 97°03′11″W	896 ft (273 m)	Kay County, Oklahoma	37°10′40″N 99°21′49″W	Comanche County, Kansas
Cimarron River	right	698 mi (1,123 km)	36°10′14″N 96°16′19″W	722 ft (220 m)	Pawnee County, Oklahoma	36°54′24″N 102°59′12″W	Cimarron County, Oklahoma
Neosho River	left	463 mi (745 km)	35°47′32″N 95°17′40″W	489 ft (149 m)	Muskogee County, Oklahoma	38°47′22″N 96°44′39″W	Morris County, Kansas
Verdigris River	left	310 mi (500 km)	35°48′01″N 95°18′28″W	489 ft (149 m)	Muskogee County, Oklahoma	38°09′08″N 96°10′01″W	Madison, Kansas
Canadian River	right	906 mi (1,458 km)	35°27′12″N 95°01′58″W	459 ft (140 m)	Haskell County, Oklahoma	37°01′00″N 105°03′00″W	Las Animas County, Colorado
Illinois River	left	99 mi (159 km)	35°29′21″N 95°05′52″W	459 ft (140 m)	Sequoyah County, Oklahoma	35°51′08″N 94°17′23″W	Pope County, Arkansas
Poteau River	right	141 mi (227 km)	35°23′15″N 94°26′03″W	407 ft (124 m)	Le Flore County, Oklahoma	34°54′44″N 93°55′29″W	Izard County, Arkansas
Mulberry River	left	70 mi (112 km)	35°28′00″N 94°02′31″W	371 ft (113 m)	Franklin County, Arkansas	35°44′45″N 93°27′01″W	Newton County, Arkansas
Big Piney Creek	left	71 mi (114 km)	35°20′34″N 93°19′44″W	338 ft (103 m)	Pope County, Arkansas	35°45′24″N 93°26′34″W	Newton County, Arkansas
Fourche La Fave River	right	140 mi (225 km)	34°58′01″N 92°35′05″W	249 ft (76 m)	Bigelow, Arkansas	34°46′08″N 94°09′33″W	Scott County, Arkansas
Bayou Meto	left	150 mi (240 km)	34°04′51″N 91°26′36″W	161 ft (49 m)	Arkansas County, Arkansas	34°59′37″N 92°18′41″W	Faulkner County, Arkansas

== Allocation problems ==
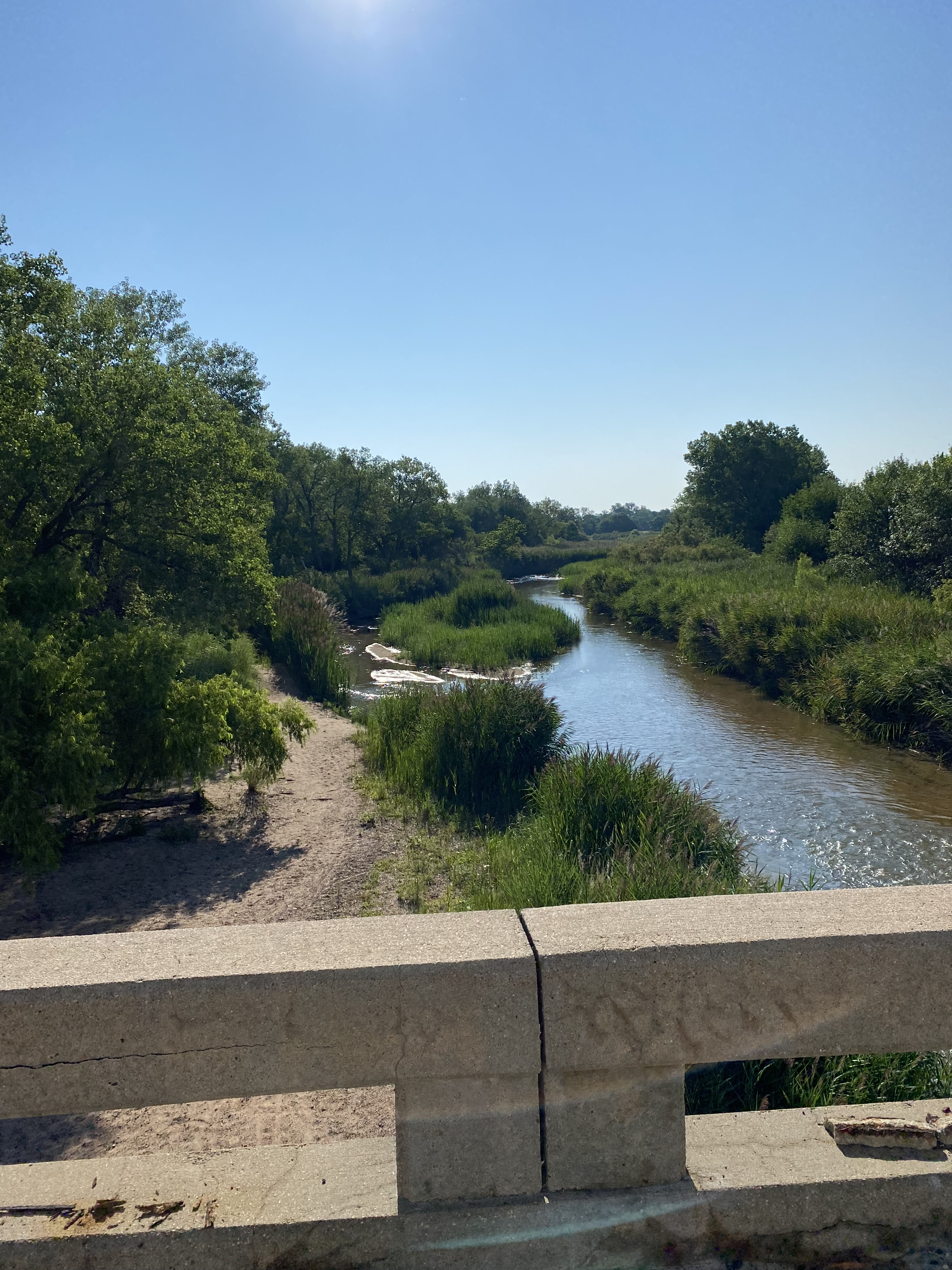
Arkansas River near Sterling Kansas

Since 1902, Kansas has claimed that Colorado takes too much of the river's water; it has filed numerous lawsuits over this issue in the U.S. Supreme Court that continue to this day, generally under the name of Kansas v. Colorado. The problems over the possession and use of Arkansas River water by Colorado and Kansas led to the creation of an interstate compact or agreement between the two states. While Congress approved the Arkansas River Compact in 1949, the compact did not stop further disputes by the two states over water rights to the river.

The Kansas–Oklahoma Arkansas River Basin Compact was created in 1965 to promote mutual consideration and equity over water use in the basin shared by those states. The Kansas–Oklahoma Arkansas River Commission was established, charged with administering the compact and reducing pollution. The compact was approved and implemented by both states in 1970 and has been in force since then.

== Riverway commerce ==
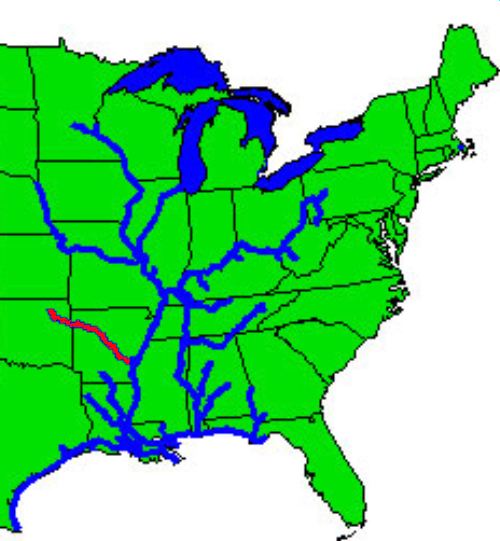
Navigable inland waterway system with McClellan-Kerr Navigational Channel shown in red

The McClellan–Kerr Arkansas River Navigation System begins at the Tulsa Port of Catoosa on the Verdigris River, enters the Arkansas River near Muskogee, and runs via an extensive lock and dam system to the Mississippi River. Through Oklahoma and Arkansas, dams which artificially deepen and widen the river to sustain commercial barge traffic and recreational use give the river the appearance of a series of reservoirs.

The McClellan–Kerr Arkansas River Navigation System diverts from the Arkansas River 2.5 mi (4.0 km) upstream of the Wilbur D. Mills Dam to avoid the long winding route which the lower Arkansas River follows. This circuitous portion of the Arkansas River between the Wilbur D. Mills Dam and the Mississippi River was historically bypassed by river vessels. Early steamboats instead followed a network of rivers—known as the Arkansas Post Canal—which flowed north of the lower Arkansas River and followed a shorter and more direct route to the Mississippi River. When the McClellan–Kerr Arkansas River Navigation System was constructed between 1963 and 1970, the Arkansas Post Canal was significantly improved, while the lower Arkansas River continued to be bypassed by commercial vessels.

== In history ==
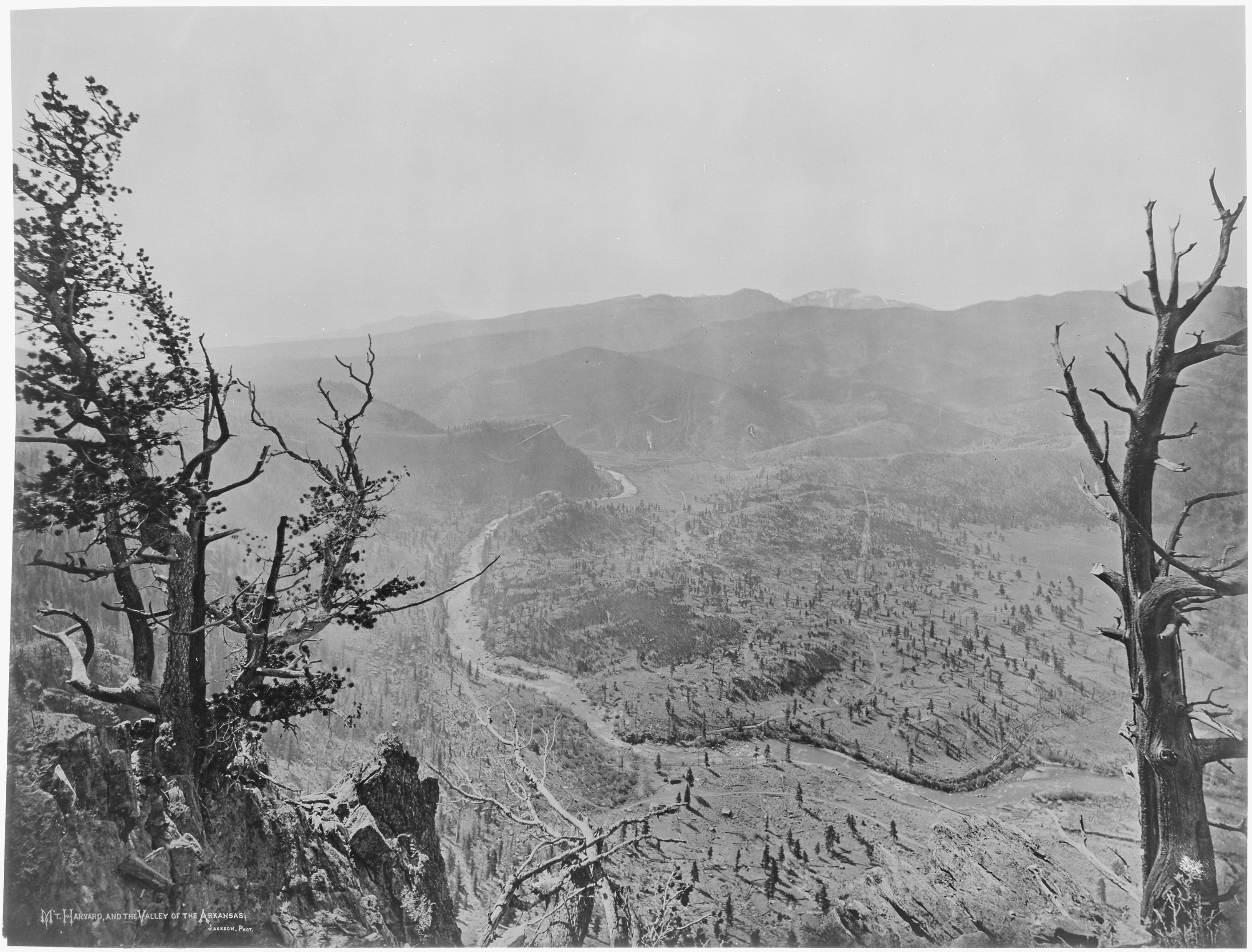
Arkansas River in Colorado, with Mount Harvard in distance, circa 1867. Photo by William Henry Jackson.

Many nations of Native Americans lived near, or along, the 1,450-mile (2,334-km) stretch of the Arkansas River for thousands of years. The first Europeans to see the river were members of the Spanish Coronado expedition on June 29, 1541. Also in the 1540s, Hernando de Soto discovered the junction of the Arkansas with the Mississippi. The Spanish originally called the river Napeste. "The name "Arkansas" was first applied by French Father Jacques Marquette, who called the river Akansa in his journal of 1673, naming it the same name as the French called the tribal people who lived on the Arkansas River. Today this tribe is known as Quapaw. The Joliet-Marquette expedition travelled the Mississippi River from Prairie du Chien, Wisconsin toward the Gulf of Mexico, but turned back at the mouth of the Arkansas River. By that time, they had encountered Native Americans carrying European trinkets and feared confrontation with Spanish conquistadors.

Jean-Baptiste Bénard de la Harpe, a French trader, explorer, and nobleman had led an expedition into what is now Oklahoma in 1718–19. His original objective was to establish a trading post near the present city of Texarkana, Arkansas, but he extended his trip overland as far north as the Arkansas River (which he designated as the Alcansas). The explorer wrote that he and nine other men, including three Caddo guides and 22 horses loaded with trade goods, had come to a native settlement overlooking the river, where there were about 6,000 natives, who gave the strangers a warm welcome. La Harpe's party was honored with the calumet ceremony and spent ten days at this location.

In 1988, evidence of a native village was discovered along the Arkansas River 13 miles (21 km) south of present-day Tulsa, Oklahoma. By then, the site was known as the Lasley Vore Site. (Note: A team led by Dr. George H. Odell, an anthropology professor from the University of Tulsa, uncovered artifacts that showed the natives were members of the Wichita people, and that the European artifacts also found there were of the same time period. Dr. Odell concluded this was most likely the place where la Harpe met the natives he described.)

French traders and trappers who had opened up trade with Indian tribes in Canada and the areas around the Great Lakes began exploring the Mississippi and some of its northern tributaries. They soon learned that the birchbark canoes, which had served them so well on the northern waterways, were too light for use on southern rivers such as the Arkansas. They turned to making and using dugout canoes, which they called pirogues, made by hollowing out the trunks of cottonwood trees. (Note: Pirogues are still used in the swamps and marshes of South Louisiana by descendants of the "Cajuns," who were exiled from eastern Canada by the British.) Cottonwoods are plentiful along the streams of the southwest and grow to large sizes. The wood is soft and easily worked with the crude tools carried by both the French and Indians. The pirogues were sturdier and could be more useful for navigating the sandbars and snags of the Southern waterways.

In 1819, the Adams–Onís Treaty set the Arkansas as part of the frontier between the United States and Spanish Mexico. This continued until the United States annexed Texas after the Mexican–American War, in 1846. The treaty was made shortly after the "Old Settler" Cherokee were pushed out of Texas and moved near what became known as Webbers Falls on the Arkansas River. They planned to reunite with the Cherokee who had moved there on the Trail of Tears in 1839. That area, then part of Arkansas Territory, would become Indian Territory and later Oklahoma.

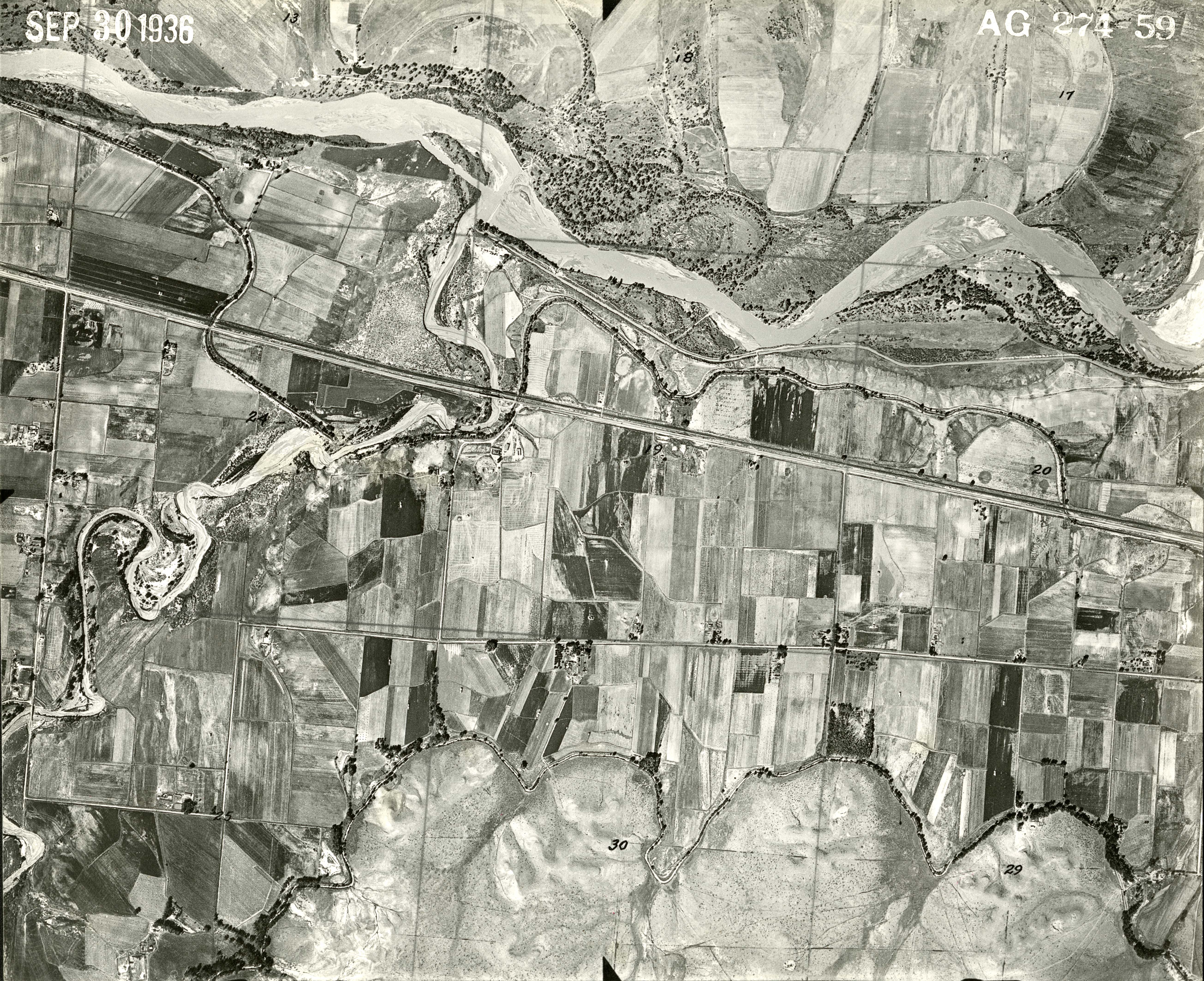
The confluence of the Arkansas and its tributary, the Apishapa River, in Colorado, 1936.

This area had long been the traditional territory of the Osage. They resisted the new Native Americans moving in with armed conflict. The US encouraged a peace treaty made in 1828 but the territory issue was still unresolved by the time thousands of additional Cherokee refugees moved to the area during the Trail of Tears.

By the time Fort Smith was established in 1817, larger capacity watercraft became available to transport goods up and down the Arkansas. These included flatboats (bateaus) and keelboats. Along with the pirogues, they transported piles of deer, bear, otter, beaver, and buffalo skins up and down the river. Agricultural products such as corn, rice, dried peaches, beans, peanuts, snakeroot, sarsaparilla, and ginseng had grown in economic importance.

On March 31, 1820, the Comet became the first steamboat to successfully navigate part of the Arkansas River, reaching a place called Arkansas Post, (Note: Arkansas Post is said to have been the first European settlement in the Mississippi Valley,) about 60 miles (97 km) above the confluence of the Arkansas and the Mississippi rivers. In mid-April 1822, the Robert Thompson, towing a keelboat, was the first steamboat to navigate the Arkansas as far as Fort Smith. For five years, Fort Smith was known as the head of navigation for steamboats on the river. It lost the title to Fort Gibson in April 1832, when three steamboats, Velocipede, Scioto, and Catawba, all arrived at Fort Gibson later that month. (Note: Fort Gibson had been built in 1824 on the bank of the Verdigris River in what had been called the "Three Forks" area of Indian Territory.)

Later, the Santa Fe Trail followed the Arkansas through much of Kansas, picking it up near Great Bend and continuing through to La Junta, Colorado. Some users elected to take the challenging Cimarron Cutoff starting at Cimarron, Kansas.

=== American Civil War ===
During the American Civil War, each side tried to prevent the other from using the Arkansas River and its tributaries as a route for moving reinforcements. Initially, the Union Army abandoned its forts in the Indian Territory, including Fort Gibson and Fort Smith, to maximize its strength for campaigns elsewhere. The Confederate Army sent troops from Texas to support its Native American allies. Union troops returned to the area later in the war, after defeating the Confederates at the Battle of Pea Ridge and the Battle of Fort Smith. They began recovering the position it had previously abandoned, most notably Fort Gibson and reopened the Arkansas River as a supply route. In September 1864, a body of Confederate irregulars led by General Stand Watie (Cherokee) successfully ambushed a Union supply ship bound for Fort Gibson. The vessel was destroyed, and a part of its cargo was looted by the Confederates.

=== Post Civil War ===
By 1890, water from the Arkansas River was being used to irrigate more than 20,000 acres (8,100 ha) of farmland in Kansas. By 1910, irrigation projects in Colorado had caused the river to stop flowing in July and August.

Flooding in 1927 severely damaged or destroyed nearly every levee downstream of Fort Smith, and led to the development of the Arkansas River Flood Control Association. It also resulted in the Federal government assigning responsibility for flood control and navigation on the Arkansas River to the U.S. Army Corps of Engineers (USACOE).

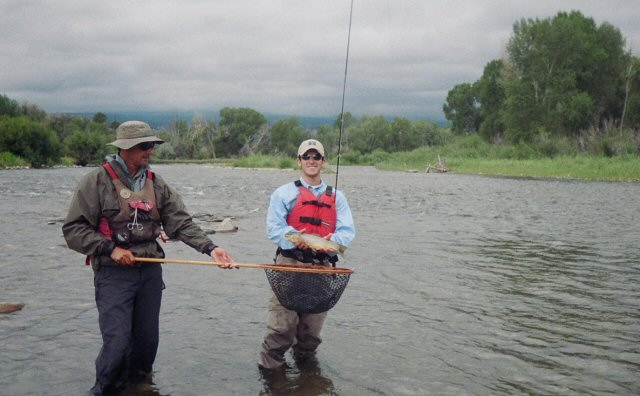
Fly fishermen on the Arkansas River near Salida, Colorado

== Angling ==
The headwaters of the Arkansas River in central Colorado have been known for exceptional trout fishing, particularly fly fishing, since the 19th century, when greenback cutthroat trout dominated the river. Today, brown trout dominate the river, which also contains rainbow trout. Trout Unlimited considers the Arkansas one of the top 100 trout streams in America, a reputation the river has had since the 1950s. From Leadville to Pueblo, the Arkansas River is serviced by numerous fly shops and guides operating in Buena Vista, Salida, Cañon City, and Pueblo. Colorado Parks and Wildlife provides regular online fishing reports for the river.

A fish kill occurred on December 29, 2010, in which an estimated 100,000 freshwater drum lined the Arkansas River bank. An investigation, conducted by the Arkansas Game and Fish Commission, found the dead fish "... cover 17 miles [27 km] of the river from the Ozark Lock and Dam downstream to River Mile 240, directly south of Hartman, Arkansas." Tests later indicated the likely cause of the kill was gas bubble trauma caused by opening the spillways on the Ozark Dam.

== Image gallery ==
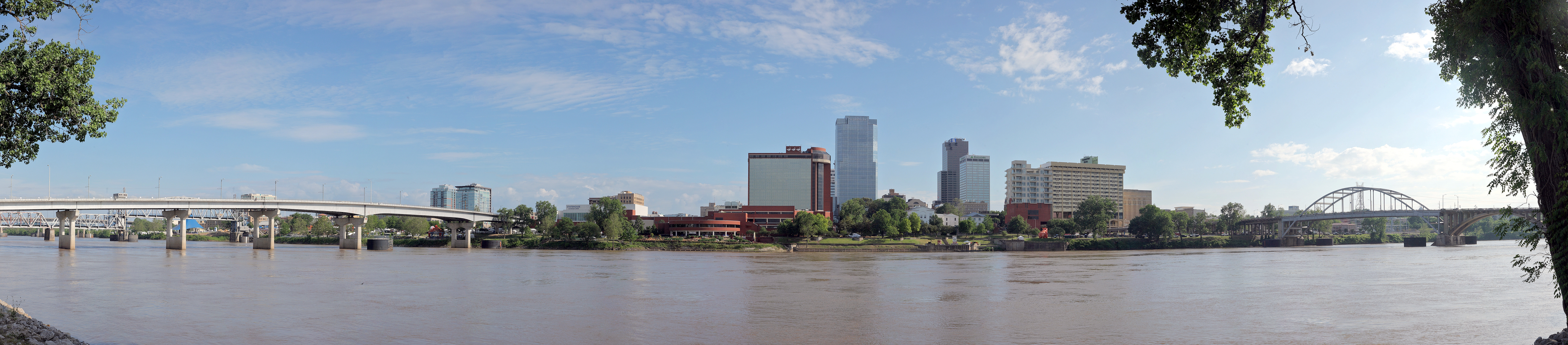
The Arkansas River passing through Little Rock, Arkansas, as viewed from the north bank in North Little Rock
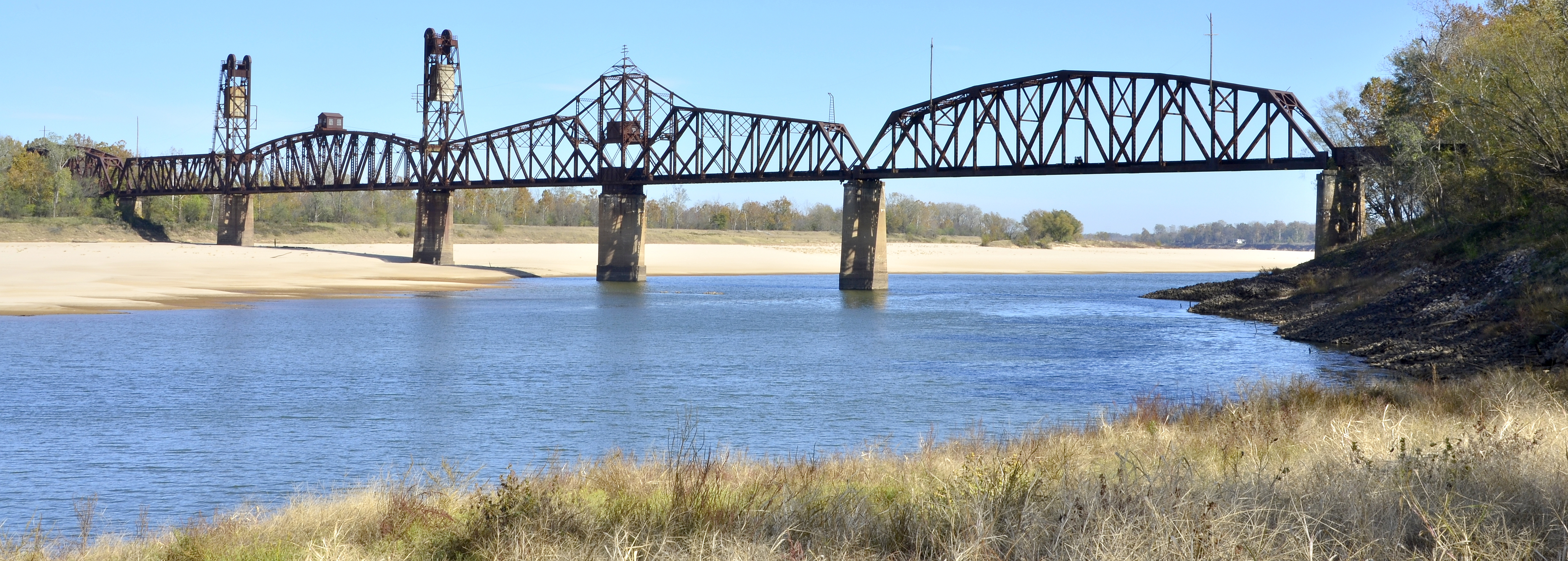
The Yancopin Bridge is the last crossing of the Arkansas River before it flows into the Mississippi River
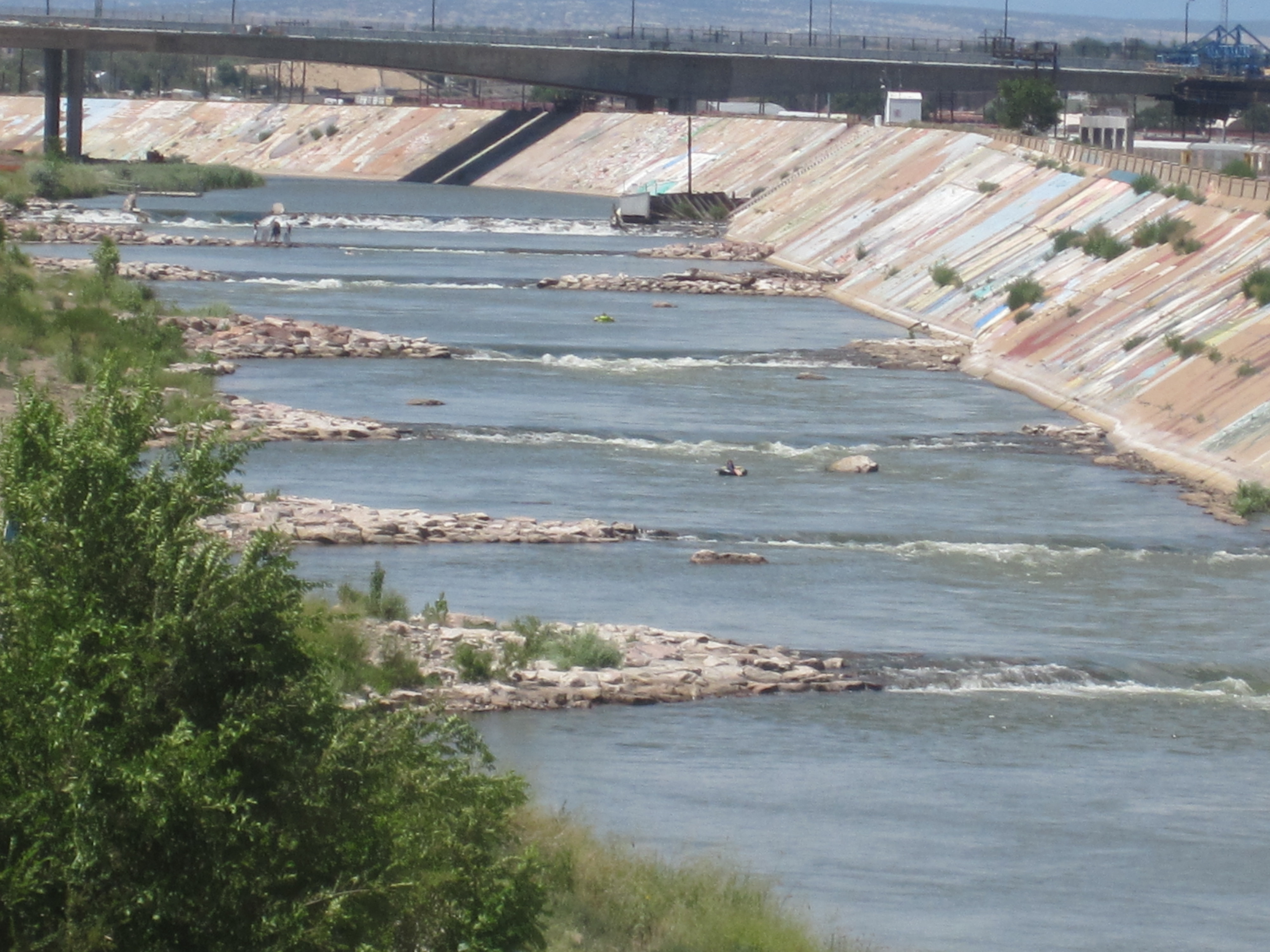
Arkansas River in downtown Pueblo, Colorado

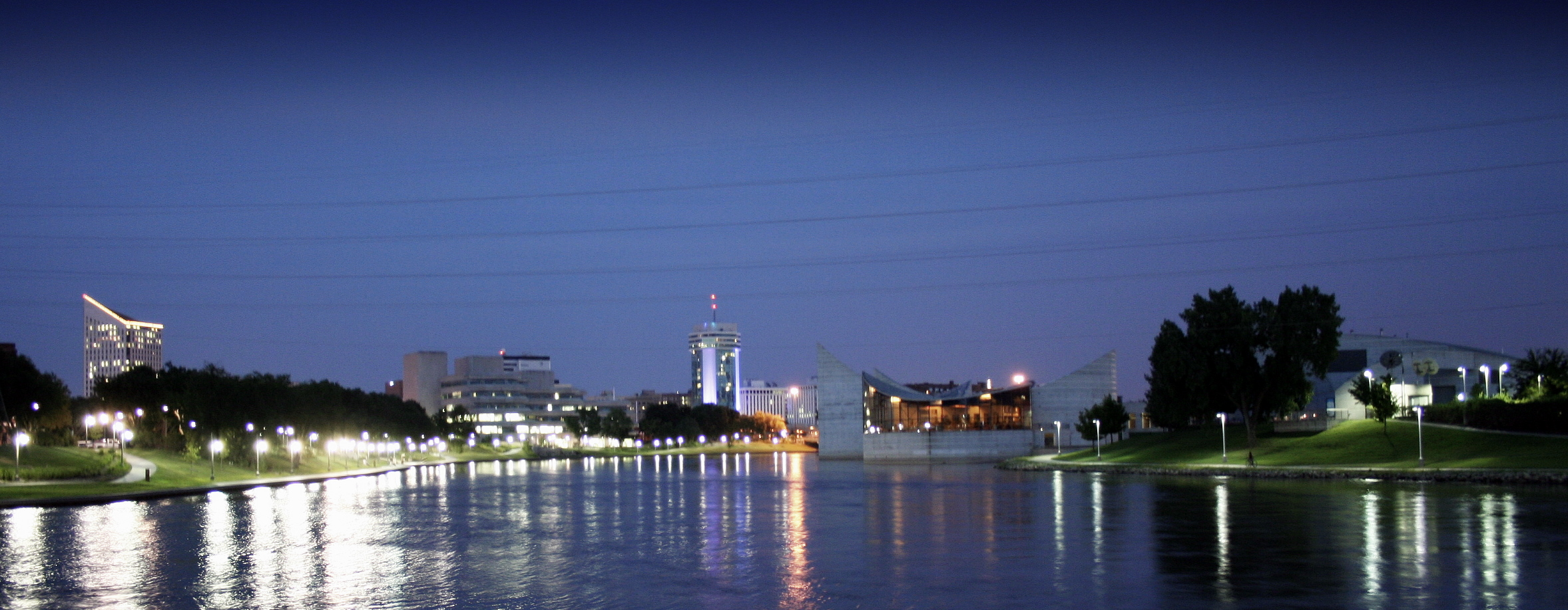
Downtown Wichita, Kansas, skyline at night from The Keeper of the Plains at the Arkansas River

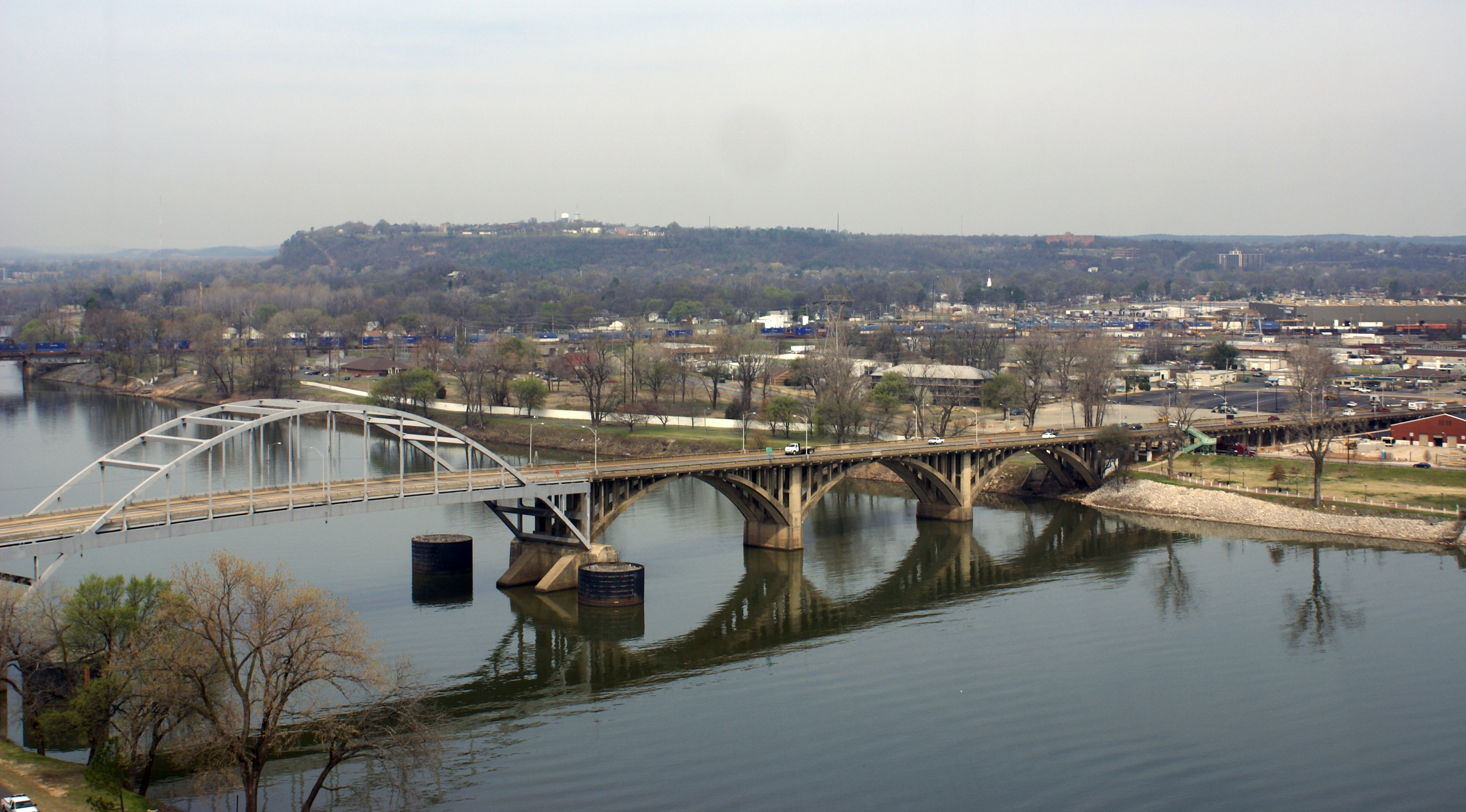
Arkansas River, looking across to North Little Rock

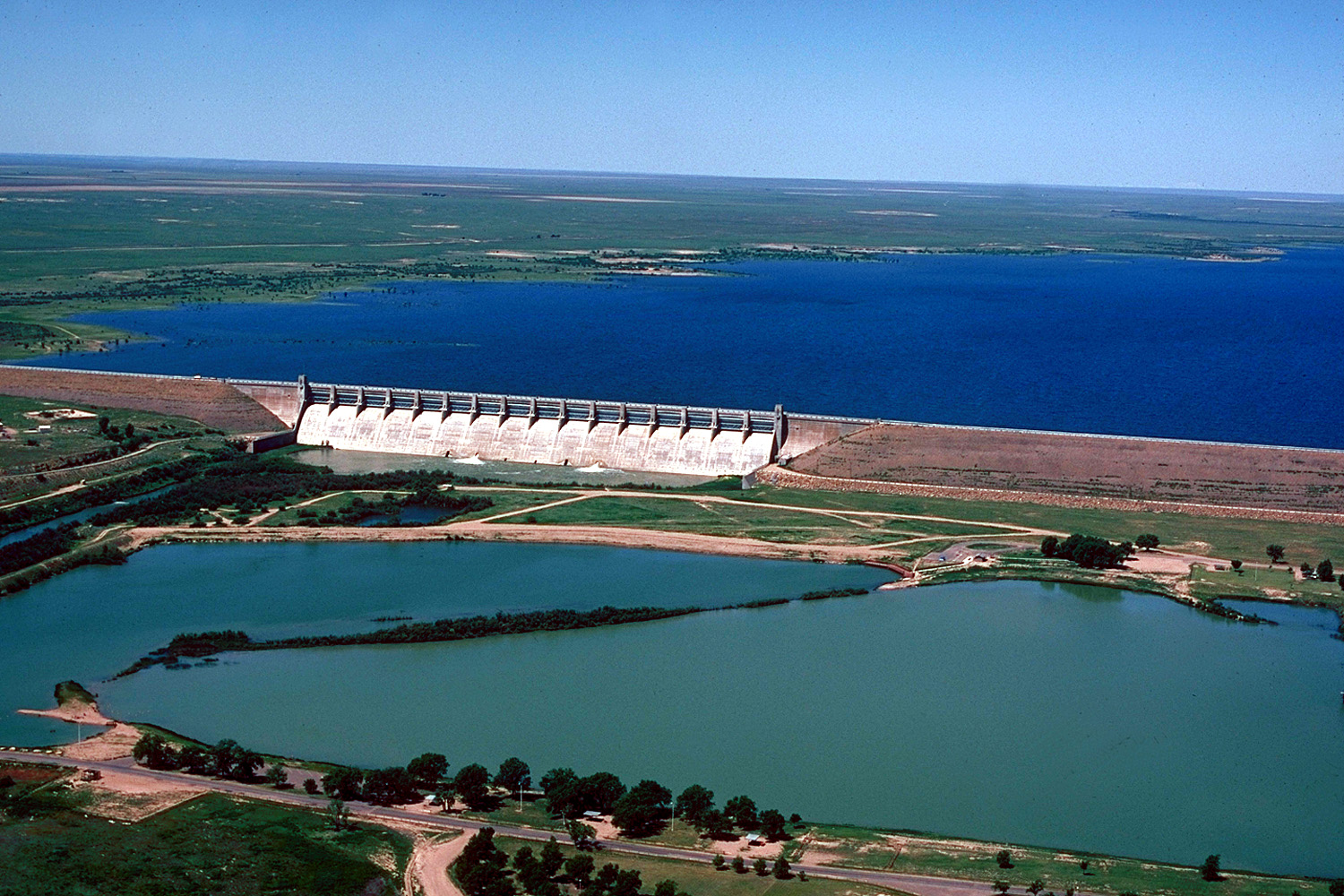
John Martin Dam and Reservoir on the Arkansas River in Bent County, Colorado

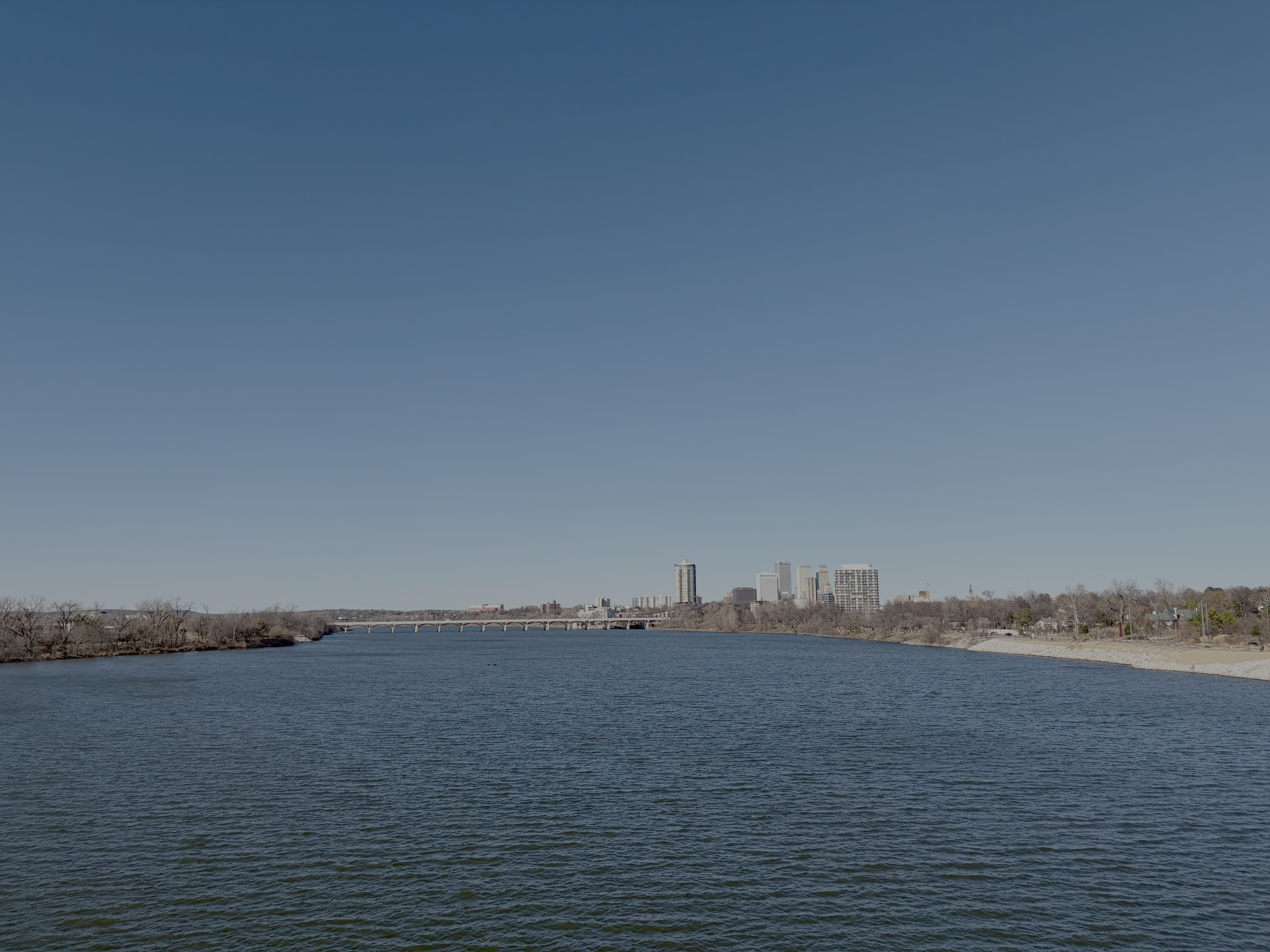
The Arkansas River in Tulsa, Oklahoma

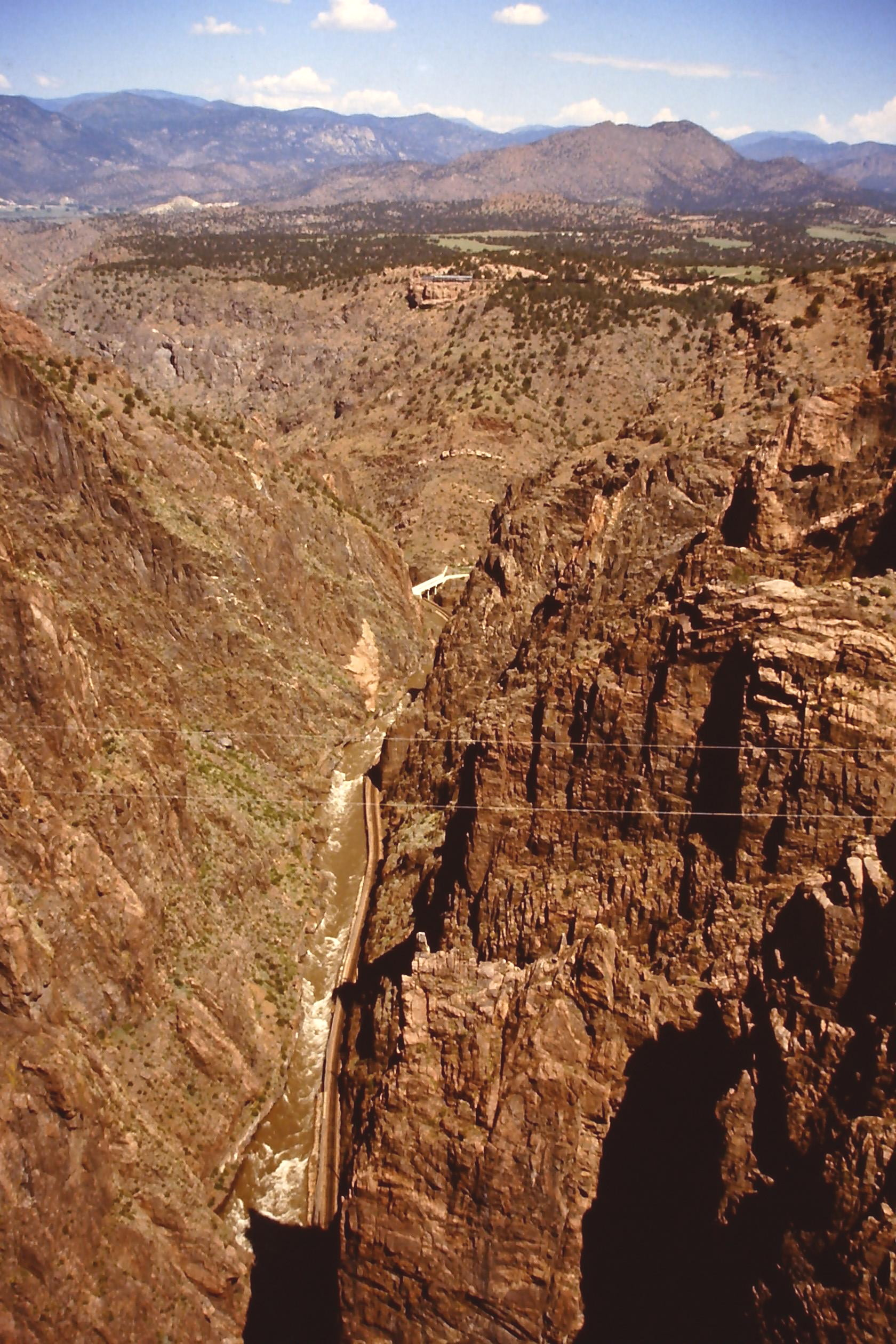
Royal Gorge

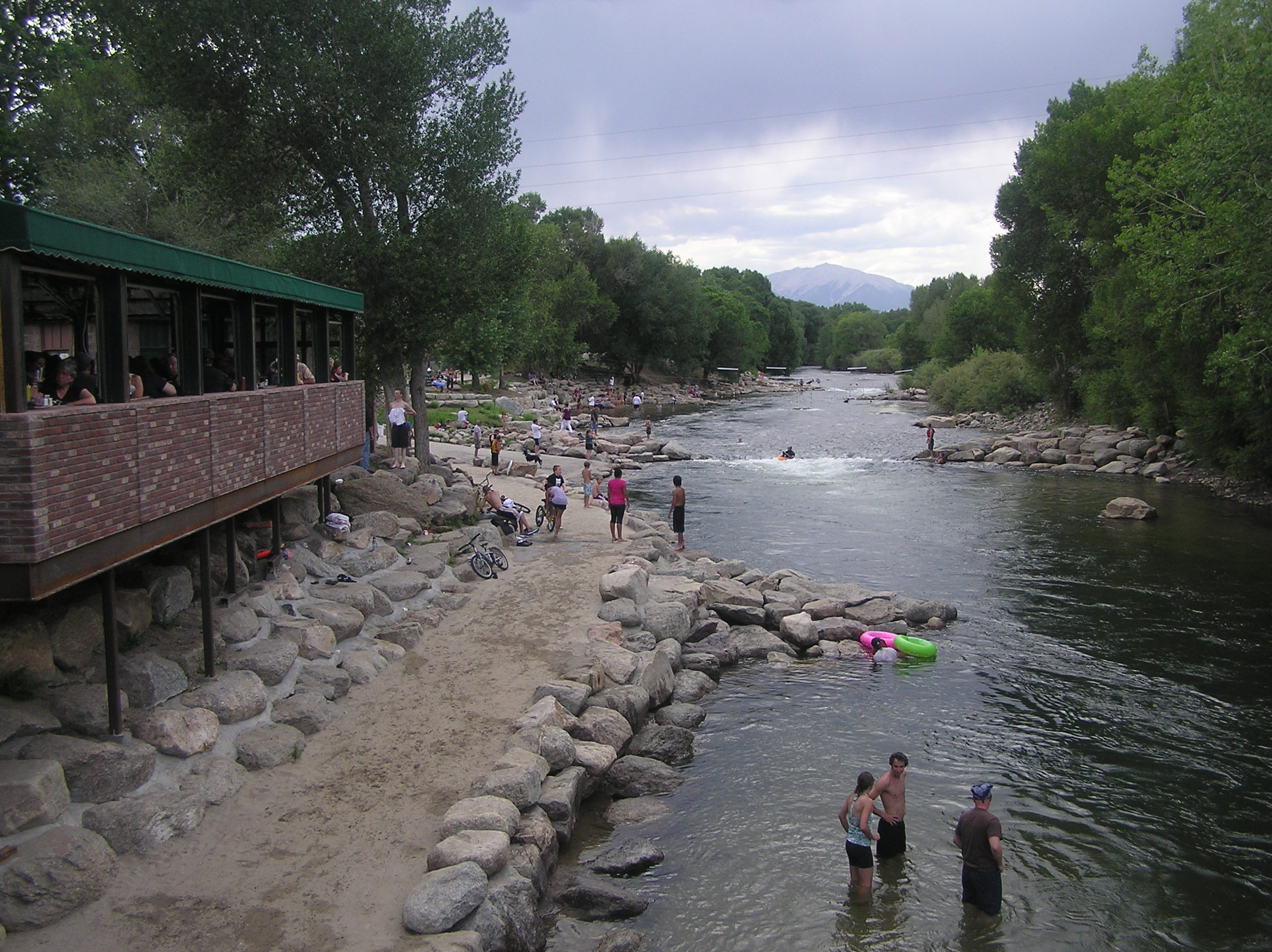
Arkansas River in Salida, Colorado

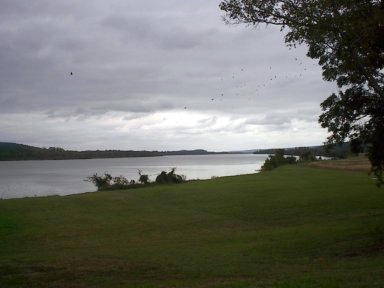
The Arkansas River in Natural Steps, Arkansas

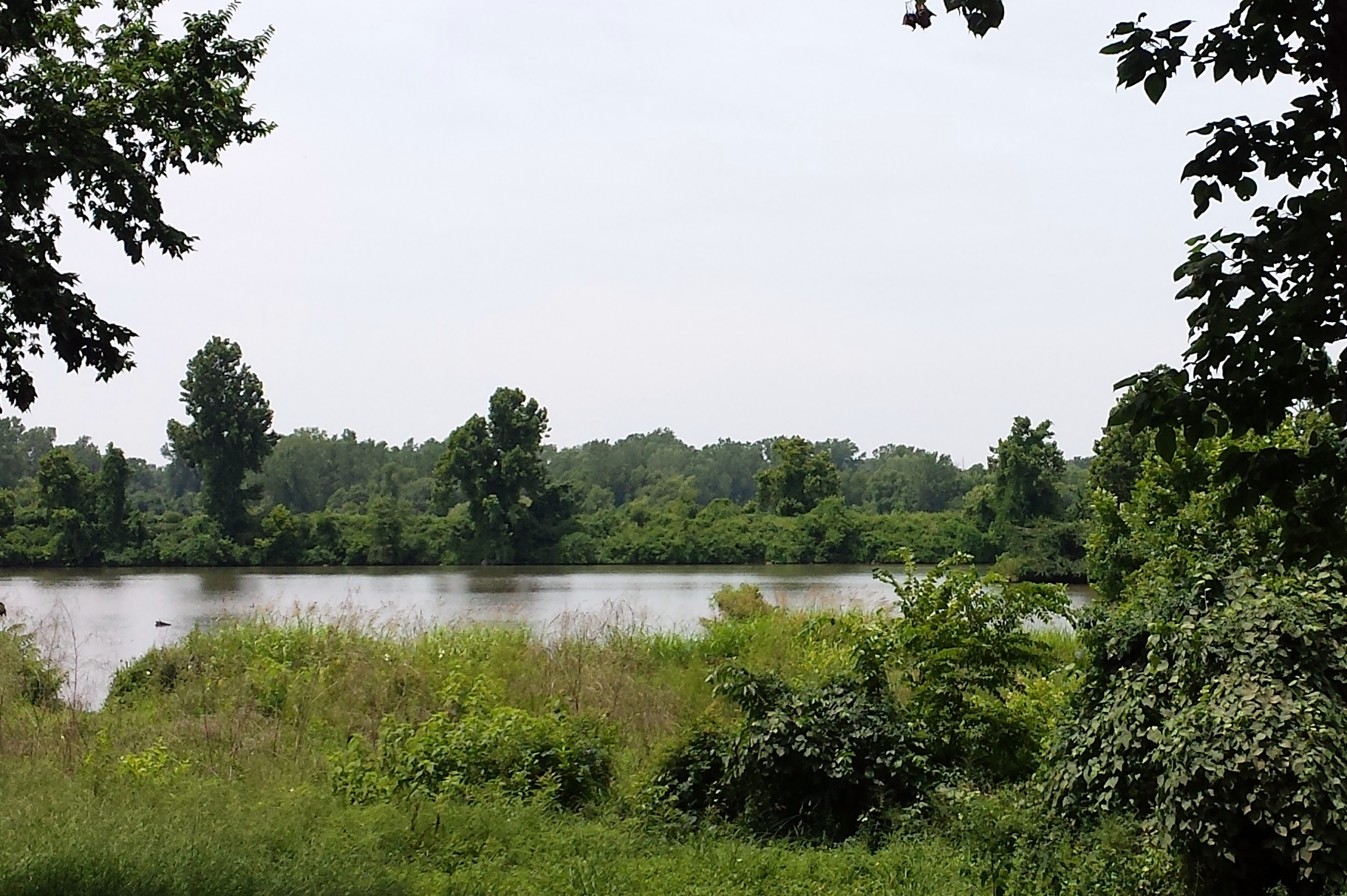
Arkansas River between Van Buren and Fort Smith, Arkansas

== See also ==
- Ackerman Island
- Cherokee in Arkansas
- Kansas v. Colorado
- List of crossings of the Arkansas River
- List of longest rivers of the United States (by main stem)
- Listing of rivers for each state: Colorado, Kansas, Oklahoma, Arkansas
- McClellan–Kerr Arkansas River Navigation System
