= The Castles (Colorado) =

Geological formation in Colorado, US

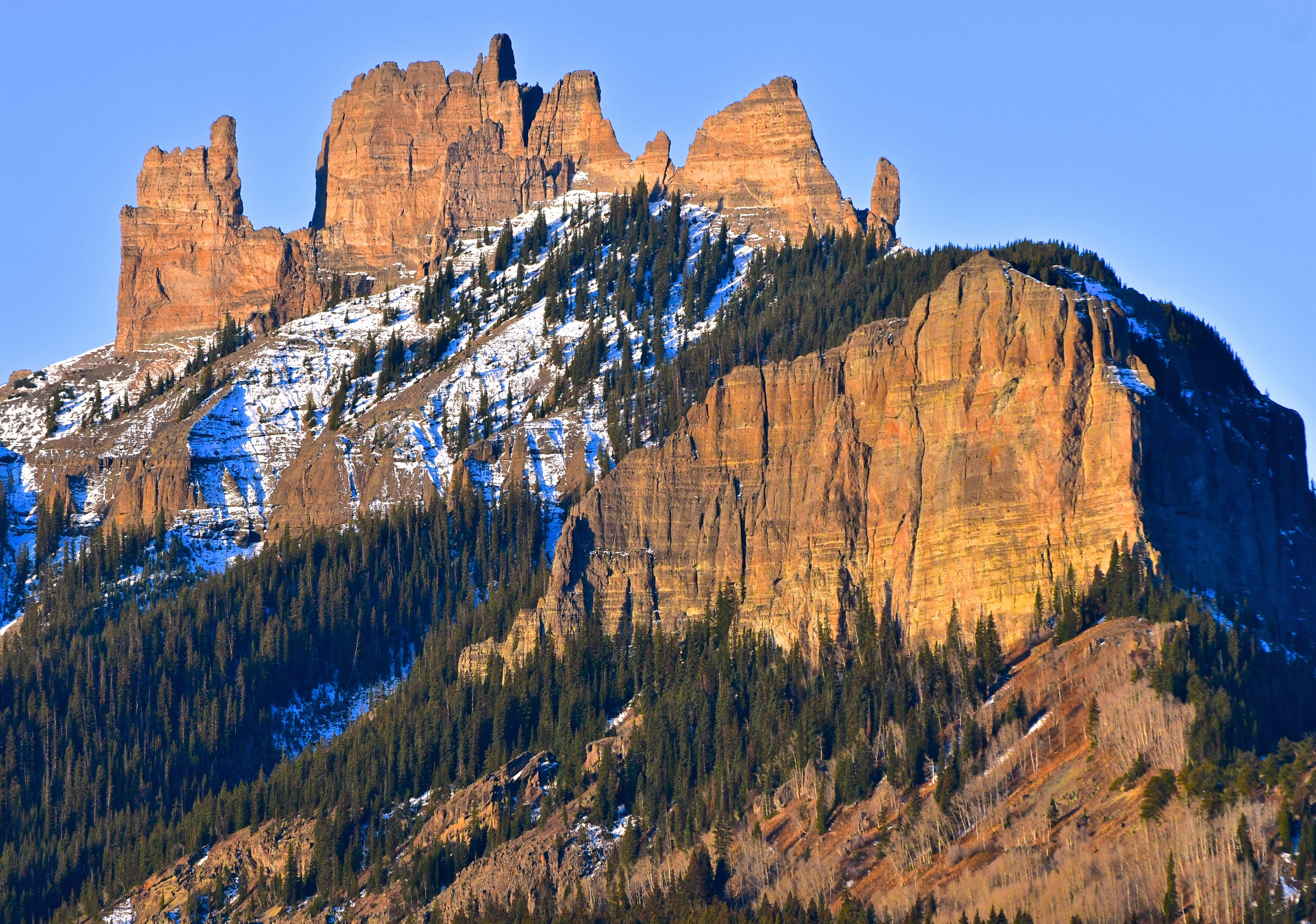
- Northeast aspect

Highest point
- Elevation: 12,296 ft (3,748 m)
- Prominence: 452 ft (138 m)
- Parent peak: West Elk Peak (13,042 ft)
- Isolation: 2.02 mi (3.25 km)
- Coordinates: 38°44′13″N 107°10′07″W

Geography
- Location within Colorado Location within the United States
- Country: United States
- State: Colorado
- County: Gunnison County
- Protected area: West Elk Wilderness
- Parent range: Rocky Mountains; West Elk Mountains
- Topo map: USGS West Elk Peak

Geology
- Rock type: Stratified Breccia

Climbing
- Easiest route: class 5.10 climbing

The Castles are naturally occurring pillars of stone in Gunnison County, Colorado, United States.

== Description ==
The Castles, elevation 12,296-feet (3,748 m), are situated in the West Elk Mountains which are a subrange of the Rocky Mountains. The landform is located 18 miles (29 km) northwest of Gunnison in the West Elk Wilderness on land managed by Gunnison National Forest. These 500-ft high pillars are the signature landmark of the West Elk Wilderness, and are one of Colorado's most unique rock formations. Precipitation runoff from the mountain's slopes drains into Castle Creek → Ohio Creek → Gunnison River. Topographic relief is significant as the summit rises 2,500 feet (762 m) above South Castle Creek in one mile (1.6 km). The landform's toponym has been officially adopted by the United States Board on Geographic Names.

== Climate ==
According to the Köppen climate classification system, The Castles is located in an alpine subarctic climate zone with cold, snowy winters, and cool to warm summers. Due to its altitude, it receives precipitation all year, as snow in winter, and as thunderstorms in summer, with a dry period in late spring.

== See also ==
- List of mountain peaks of Colorado

== Gallery ==
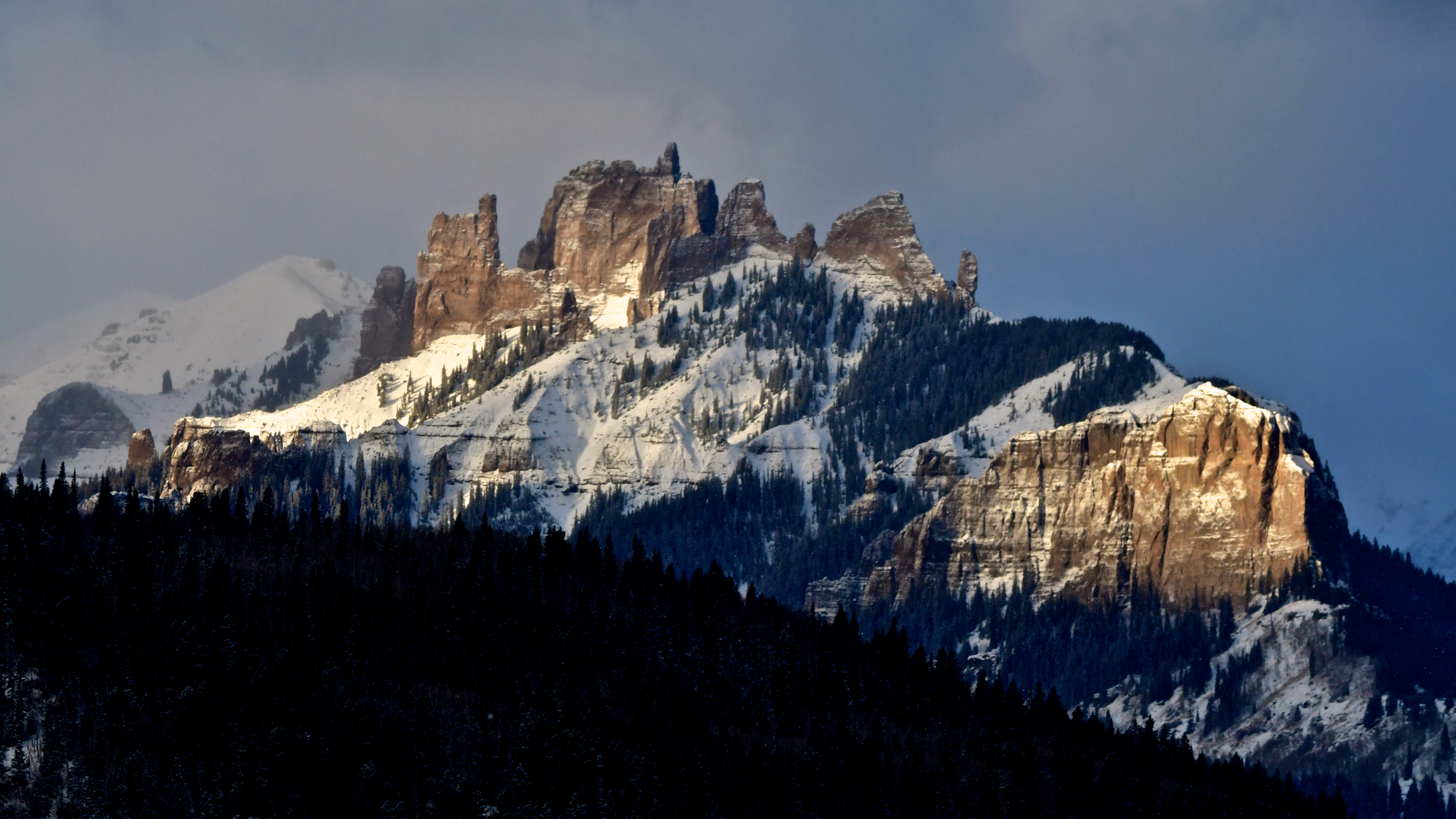

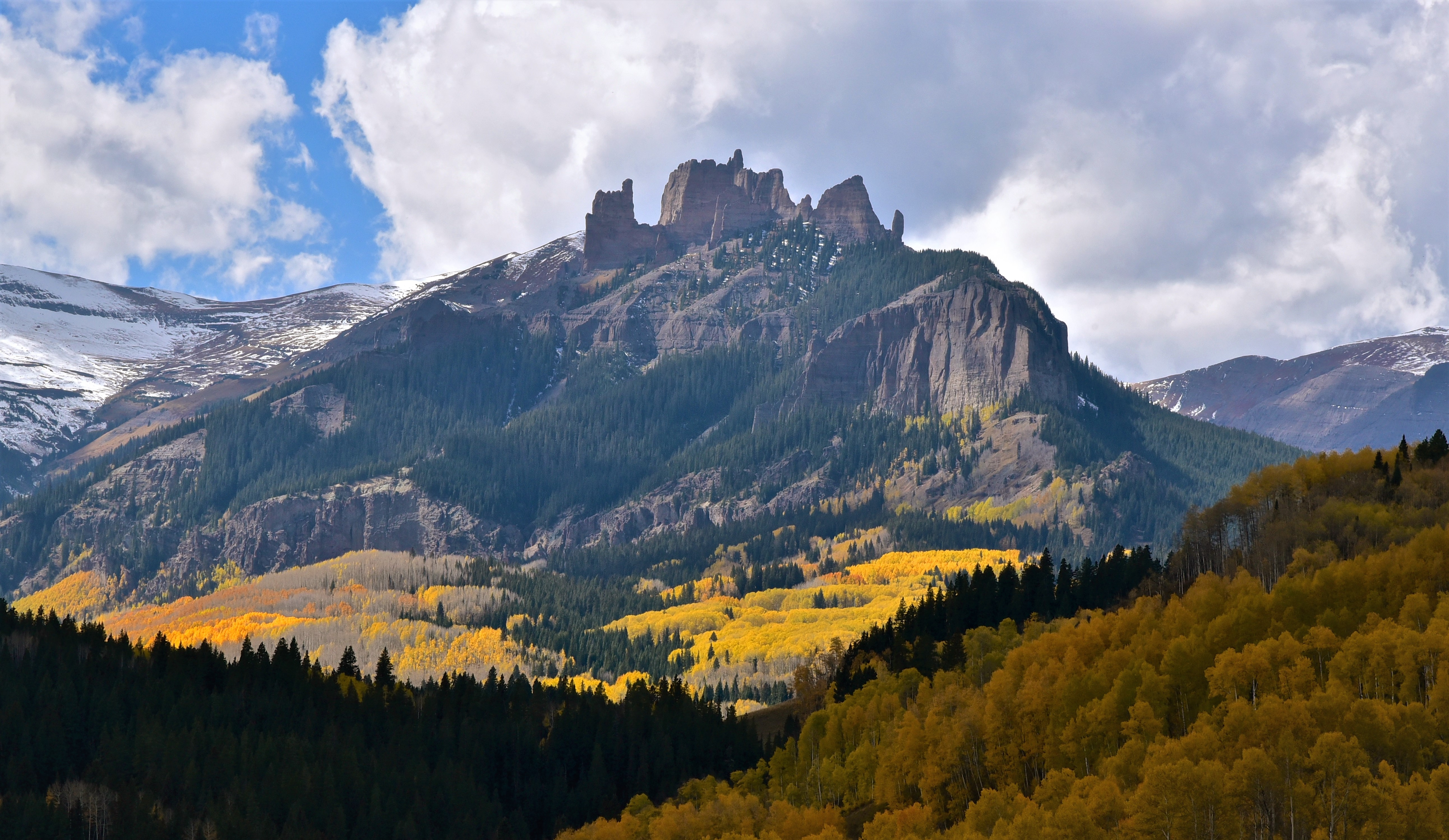

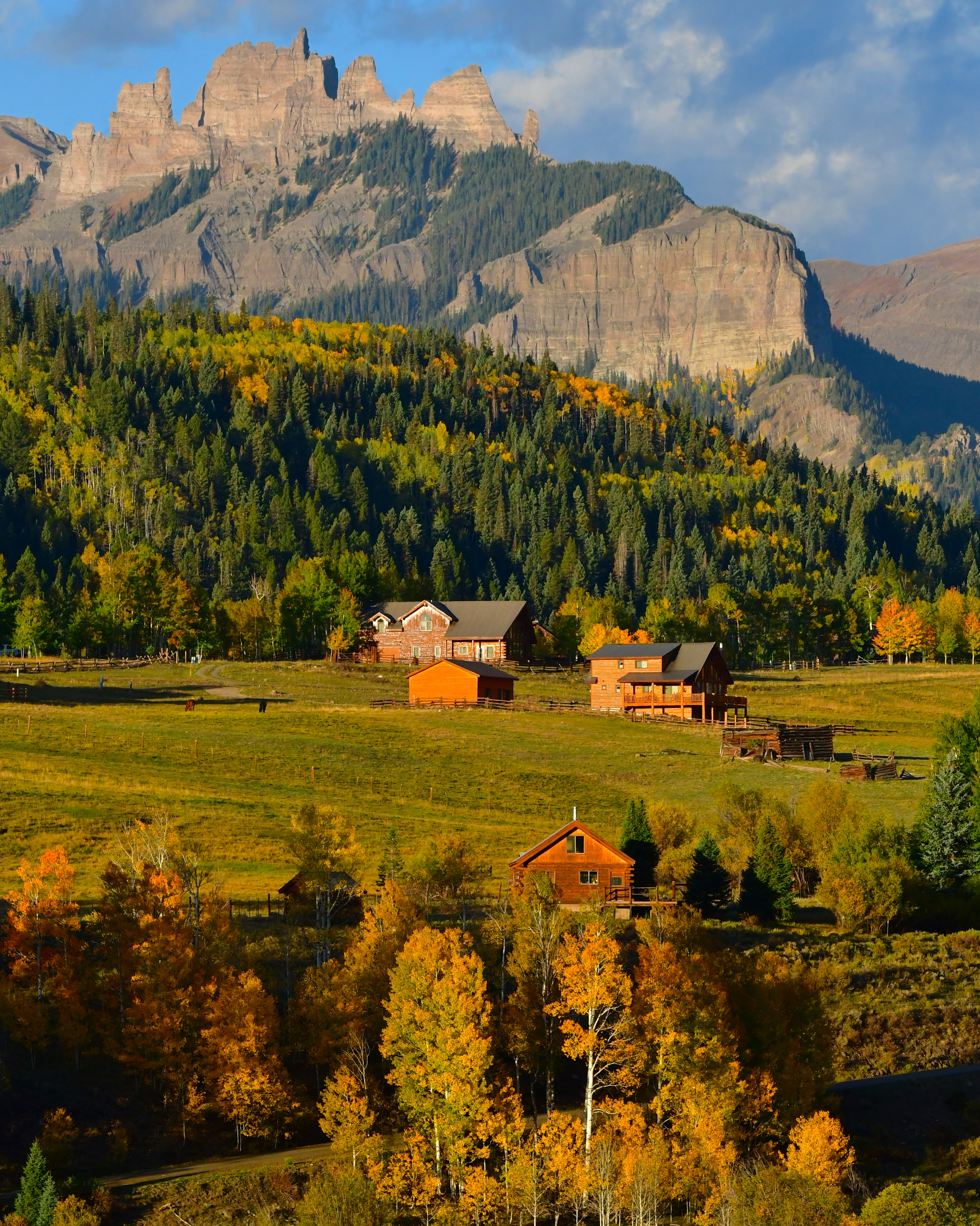

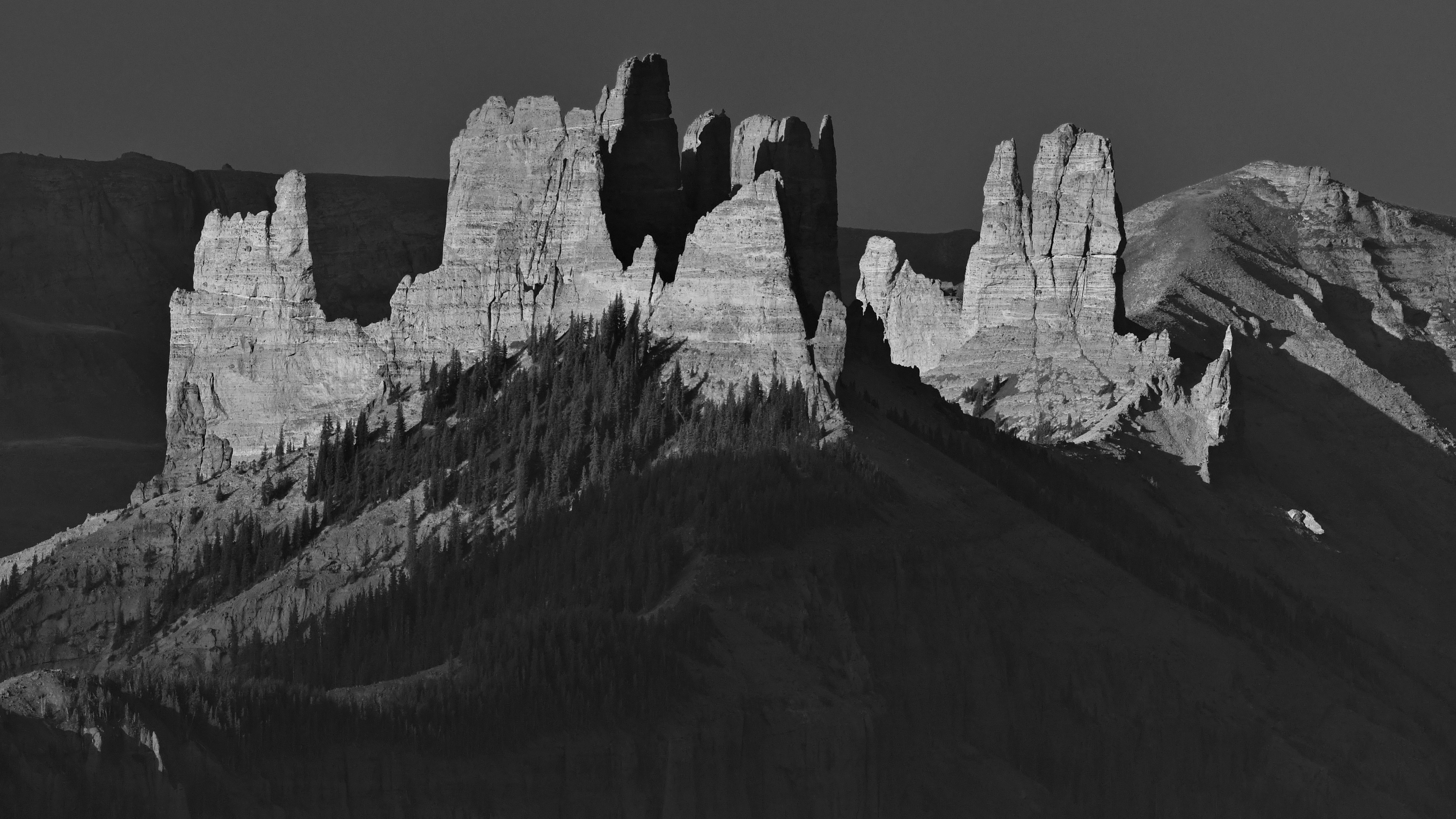

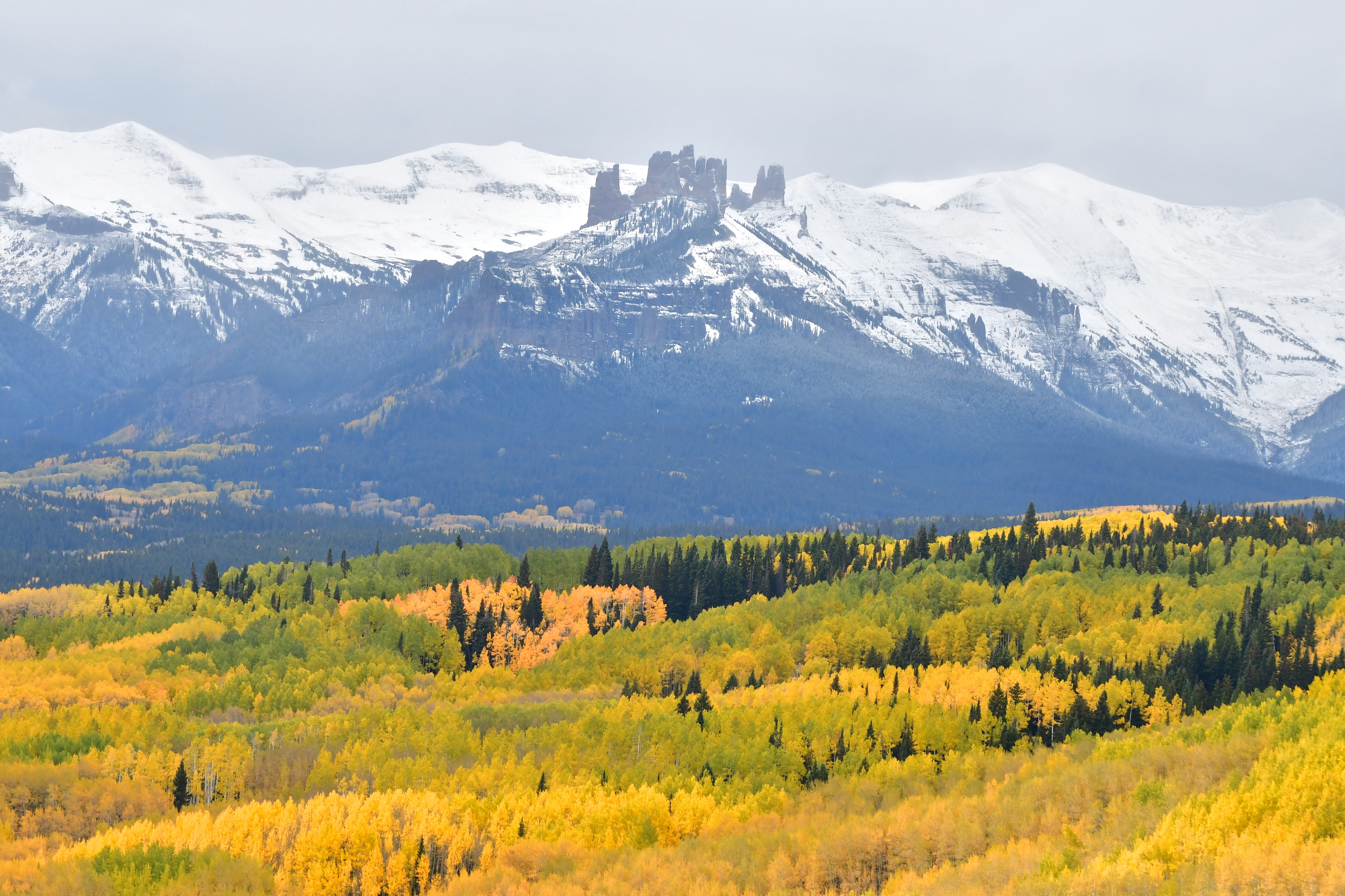
