= Bald Mountain (Gunnison County, Colorado) =

Mountain in Gunnison County, Colorado, United States

- Location within Colorado

Highest point
- Elevation: 11,787 ft (3,593 m)
- Coordinates: 38°39′40″N 107°24′37″W

Geography
- Location: Gunnison County, Colorado, U.S.
- Parent range: West Elk Mountains
- Topo map: USGS 7.5' topographic map

Climbing
- Easiest route: hike

Bald Mountain is a mountain summit in the West Elk Mountains range of the Rocky Mountains of North America. The 11,787-foot (3,593 m) peak is located in the West Elk Wilderness of the Gunnison National Forest, 11 miles (18 km) east-southeast of Crawford, Colorado in Gunnison County, Colorado, United States.

== See also ==
- Peaks of the West Elk Wilderness on ListsOfJohn.com.
- List of Colorado mountain ranges
