= West Beckwith Mountain =

Mountain in Colorado, United States

- West Beckwith Peak
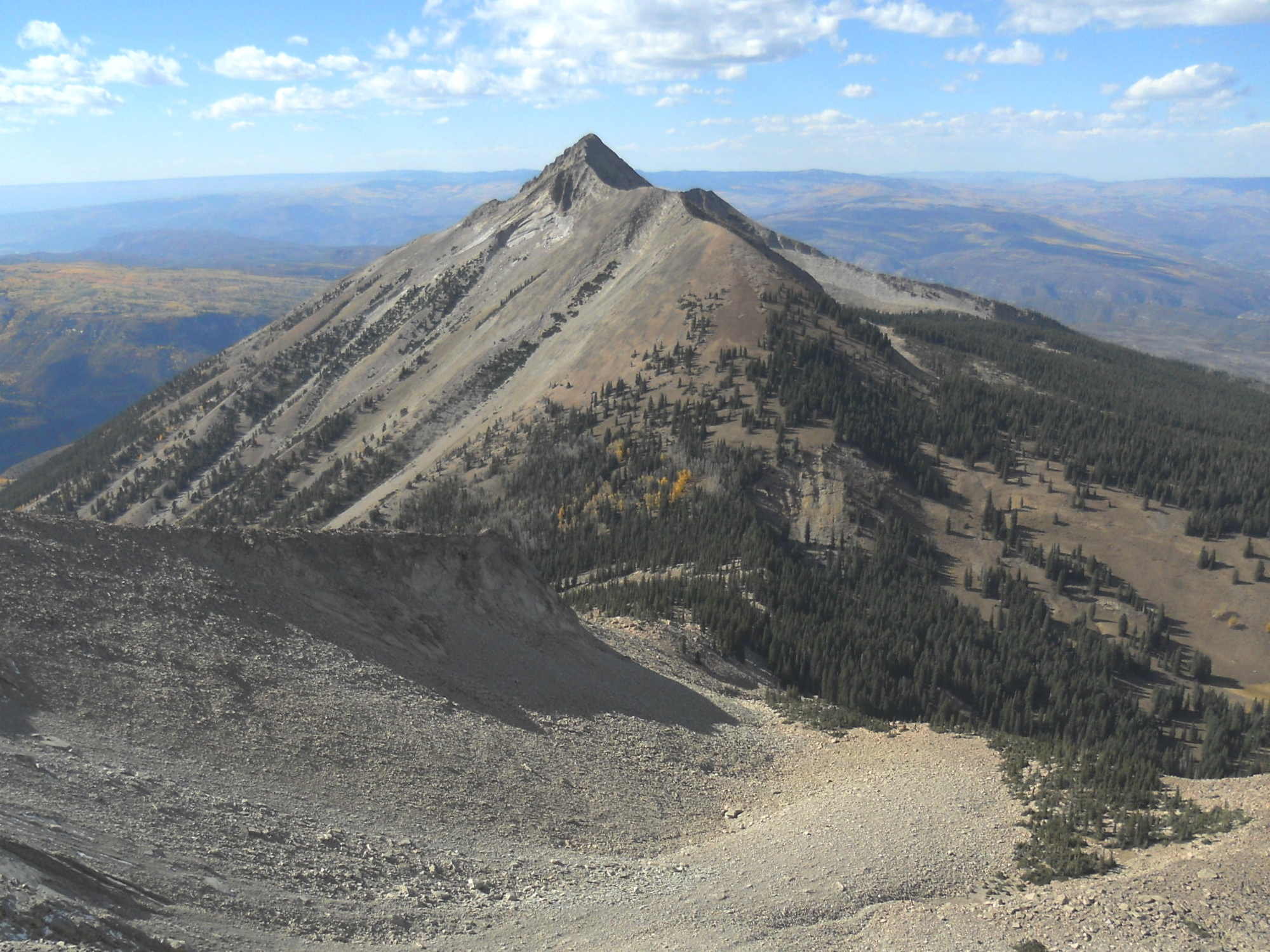
- West Beckwith Mountain viewed from the southeast.

Highest point
- Elevation: 12,185 ft (3,714 m)
- Prominence: 1,465 ft (447 m)
- Isolation: 1.8 mi (2.9 km)
- Coordinates: 38°51′35″N 107°16′27″W

Geography
- Location within Colorado
- Location: Gunnison County, Colorado, US
- Parent range: West Elk Mountains
- Topo map(s): USGS 7.5' topographic map West Beckwith Mountain, Colorado

Climbing
- Easiest route: hike

West Beckwith Mountain is a prominent mountain summit in the West Elk Mountains range of the Rocky Mountains of North America. The 12,185-foot (3,714 m) peak is located in the West Elk Wilderness of Gunnison National Forest, about 16.5 miles (26.5 km) southwest of Crested Butte in Gunnison County, Colorado, United States.

West Beckwith Mountain is a laccolith, formed when magma intruded into Mancos Shale some 30 million years ago. Since then, erosion has removed the softer, overlying sedimentary rock, exposing the more resistant igneous rock. West Beckwith Mountain is one of over a dozen laccoliths in the West Elk and adjacent Elk Mountains.

== Historical names ==
- West Beckwith Peak

== See also ==
- East Beckwith Mountain
- List of Colorado mountain ranges
