= Anthracite Range =

Mountain range in Colorado, United States

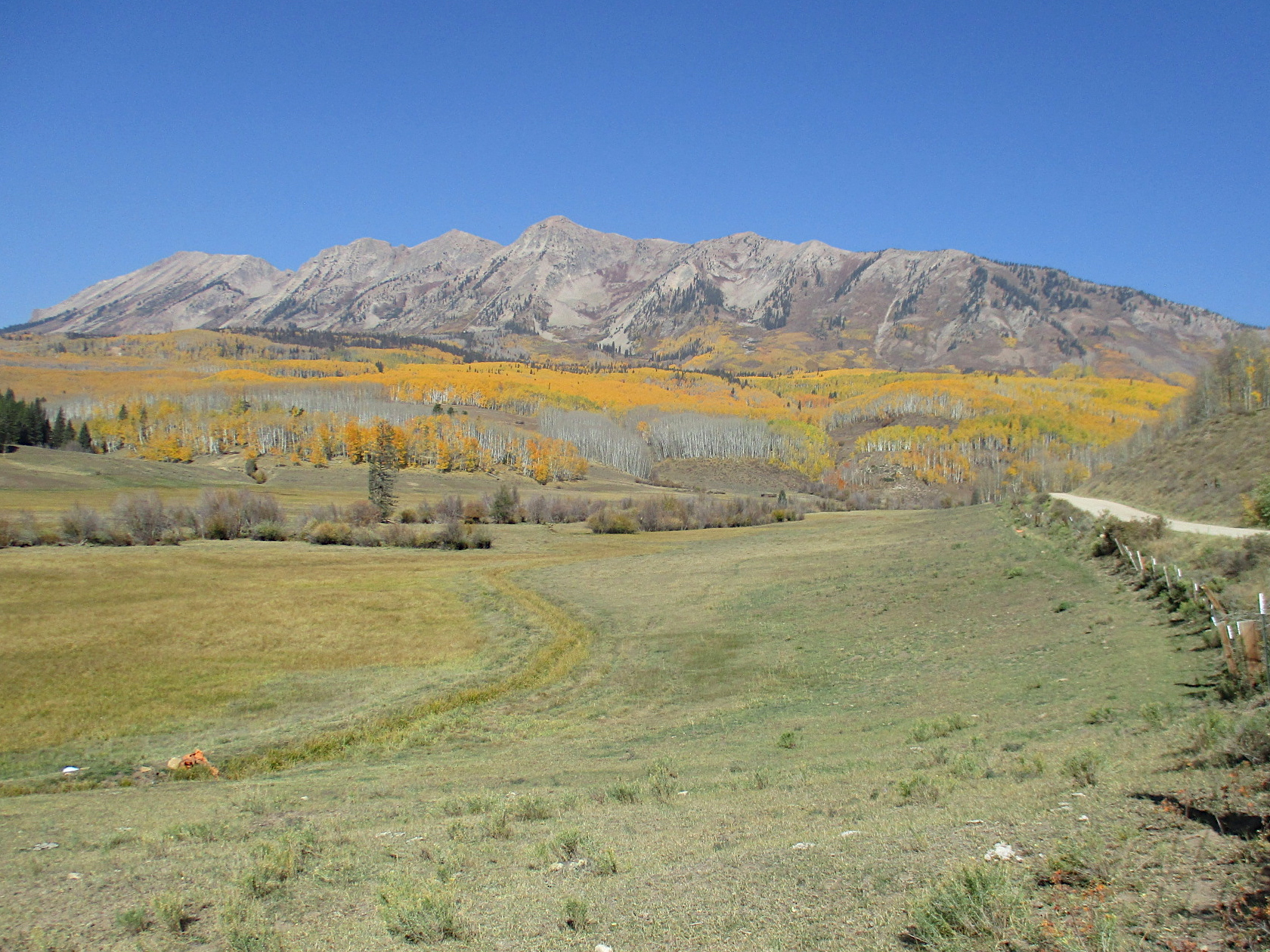
- Anthracite Range

Highest point
- Peak: Anthracite Range High Point
- Elevation: 12,394 ft (3,778 m)
- Prominence: 2,105 ft (642 m)
- Coordinates: 38°48′52″N 107°08′40″W

Geography
- Location within Colorado
- Country: United States
- State: Colorado
- County: Gunnison
- Parent range: West Elk Mountains, Rocky Mountains

The Anthracite Range is a mountain range in the West Elk Mountains, a sub-range of the Rocky Mountains of North America. The range is located in Gunnison County of western Colorado and lies within the West Elk Wilderness of the Gunnison National Forest. The Anthracite Range is one of several prominent laccoliths found in the West Elk Mountains.

== Geology ==
The Anthracite Range is a laccolith, formed when magma intruded into sedimentary strata of the Mesaverde Formation approximately 30 million years ago. Subsequent erosion has removed the softer, overlying sedimentary rock thereby exposing the more resistant igneous rock that characterizes the mountain today. The range is composed of quartz monzonite porphyry and granodiorite porphyry. The Anthracite Range was glaciated, and the most prominent glacial cirques are located on the north and east sides of the range.

The range is named after anthracite, a high-quality, metamorphized coal found in the sedimentary rock of the Mesaverde Formation at the base of this and nearby laccoliths.

== Summits ==
The Anthracite Range is an east-west oriented ridge less than 5 miles (8 km) in length, but there are several summits of interest to mountaineers and peakbaggers. From west to east, these summits include: the Anthracite Range High Point (elevation 12,385 ft (3,775 m)), prominence 2,125 ft (648 m)); Unnamed Peak 12,300 (elevation 12,300 ft (3,700 m)); Ohio Peak (elevation 12,271 ft (3,740 m)); and Unnamed Peak 11,555 (elevation 11,555 ft (3,522 m)). These summits are most often accessed from Ohio Pass where a climber's trail enters the wilderness area, traverses southwest across talus slopes then up through a cirque to the ridge just west of Unnamed Peak 11,555. From there, the summits are reached by hiking along the ridge.

== Gallery ==
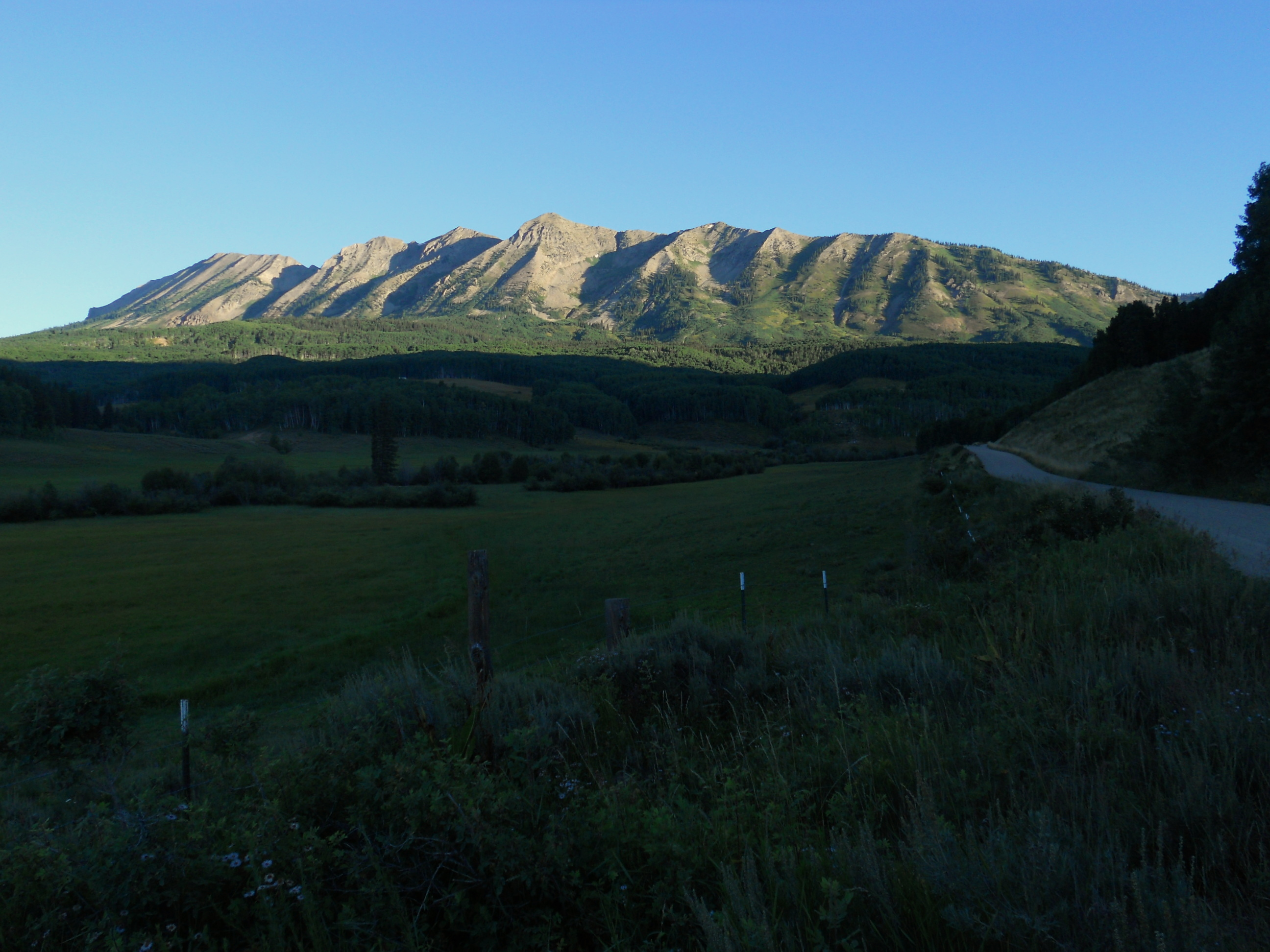
Anthracite Range from the southeast

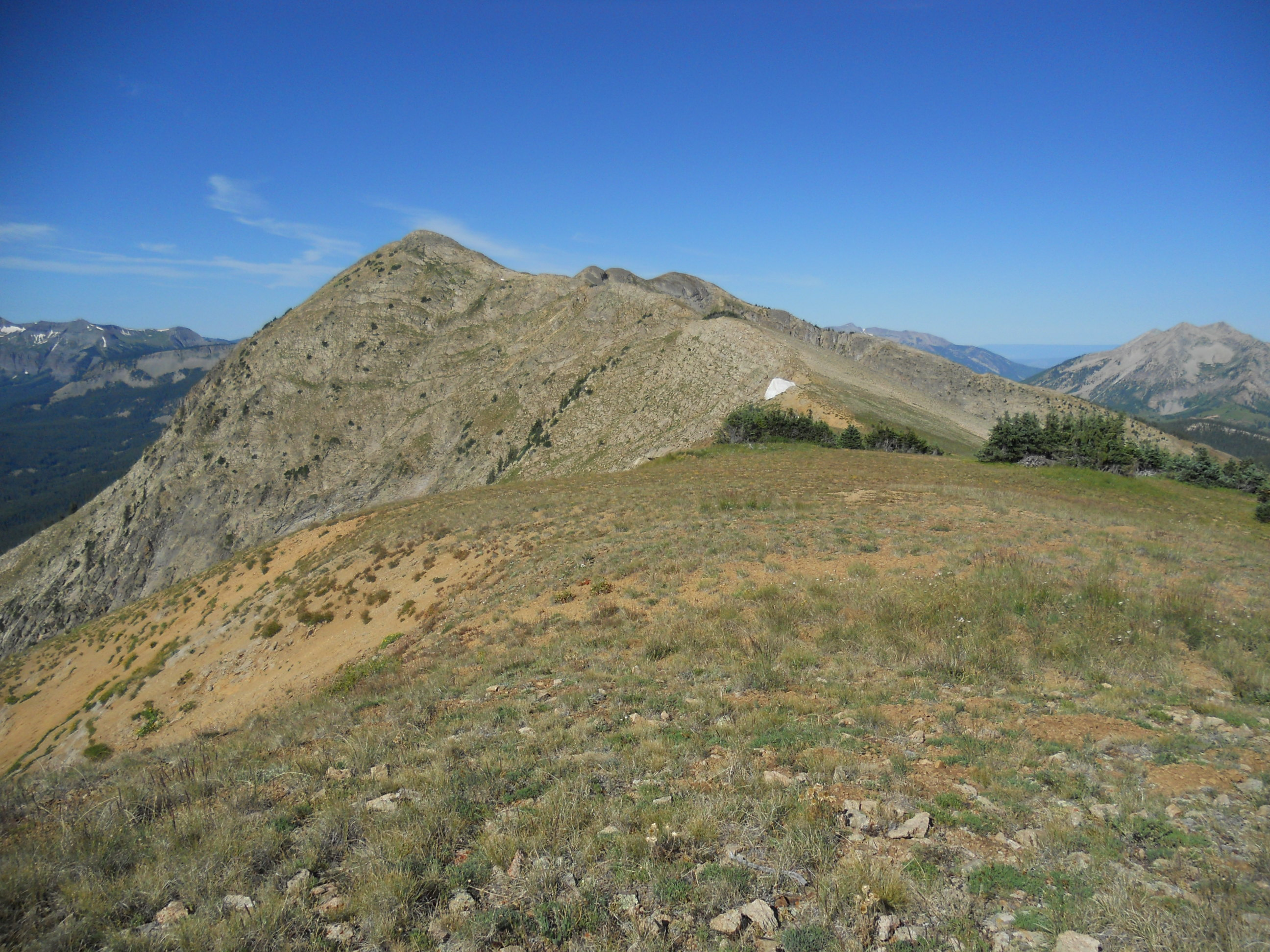
Ohio Peak, the only officially named summit in the Anthracite Range

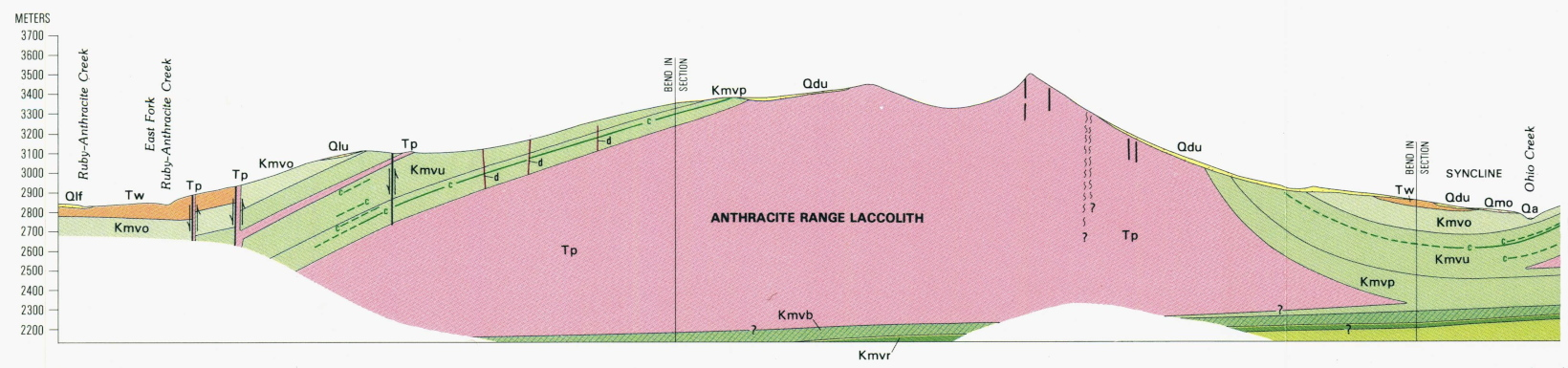
Geologic cross section of the Anthracite Range

== See also ==
List of the most prominent summits of Colorado
