= Ohio Pass =

Mountain pass in Colorado, USA

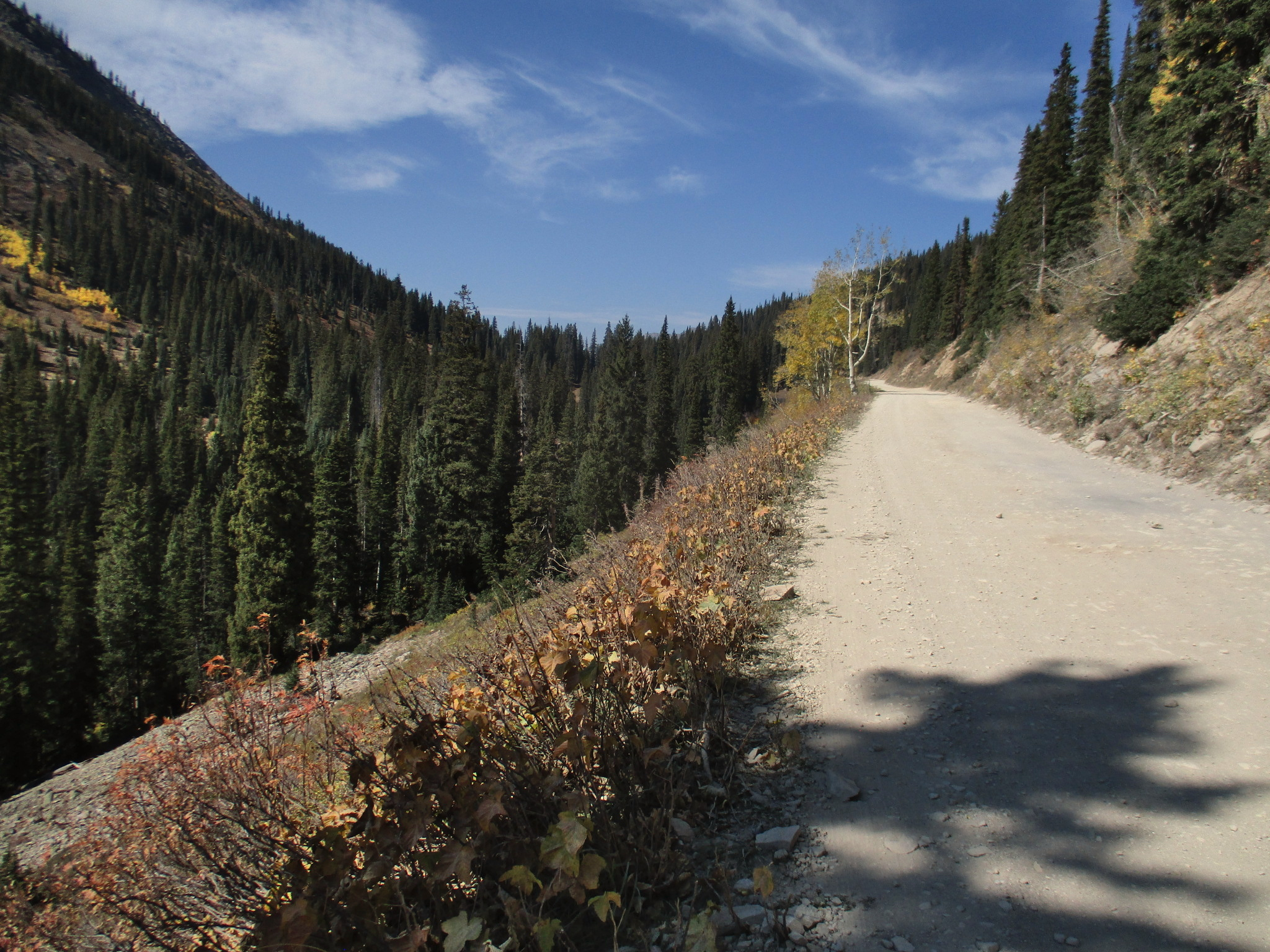
- Ohio Pass
- Interactive map of Ohio Pass
- Elevation: 10,065 ft (3,068 m)
- Traversed by: Gunnison County Road 730 (Unpaved road)

Third Approach
- Location: Gunnison County, Colorado, United States
- Range: West Elk Mountains
- Coordinates: 38°50′05″N 107°05′30″W
- Topo map: USGS Mount Axtell

Ohio Pass (elevation 10,065 feet (3,068 m)) is a mountain pass in Gunnison County, Colorado, located one mile southeast of Kebler Pass. Gunnison County Road 730 (Forest Road 730) traverses the pass, which is a gap between Mount Axtell and Ohio Peak in the Anthracite Range, part of the West Elk Mountains. The pass divides the waters of Ruby Anthracite Creek to the north and Ohio Creek to the south.

== History ==
In 1874, the Hayden Survey found a well established Ute trail traversing Ohio Pass. With the rush of miners to the area in 1879, a wagon road was constructed over the pass to link the new mining camps of Ruby and Irwin to the north with the town of Gunnison to the south. By 1881, the Denver, South Park and Pacific Railroad began constructing a railroad grade over Ohio Pass but this effort was abandoned in early 1883. Ultimately the tracks stopped at coal mines 7 miles (11 km) south of the pass. Portions of the old wagon road and the partially constructed railroad bed are detectable today, particularly on the south side of the pass.
