= Mount Guero =

Mountain in the state of Colorado

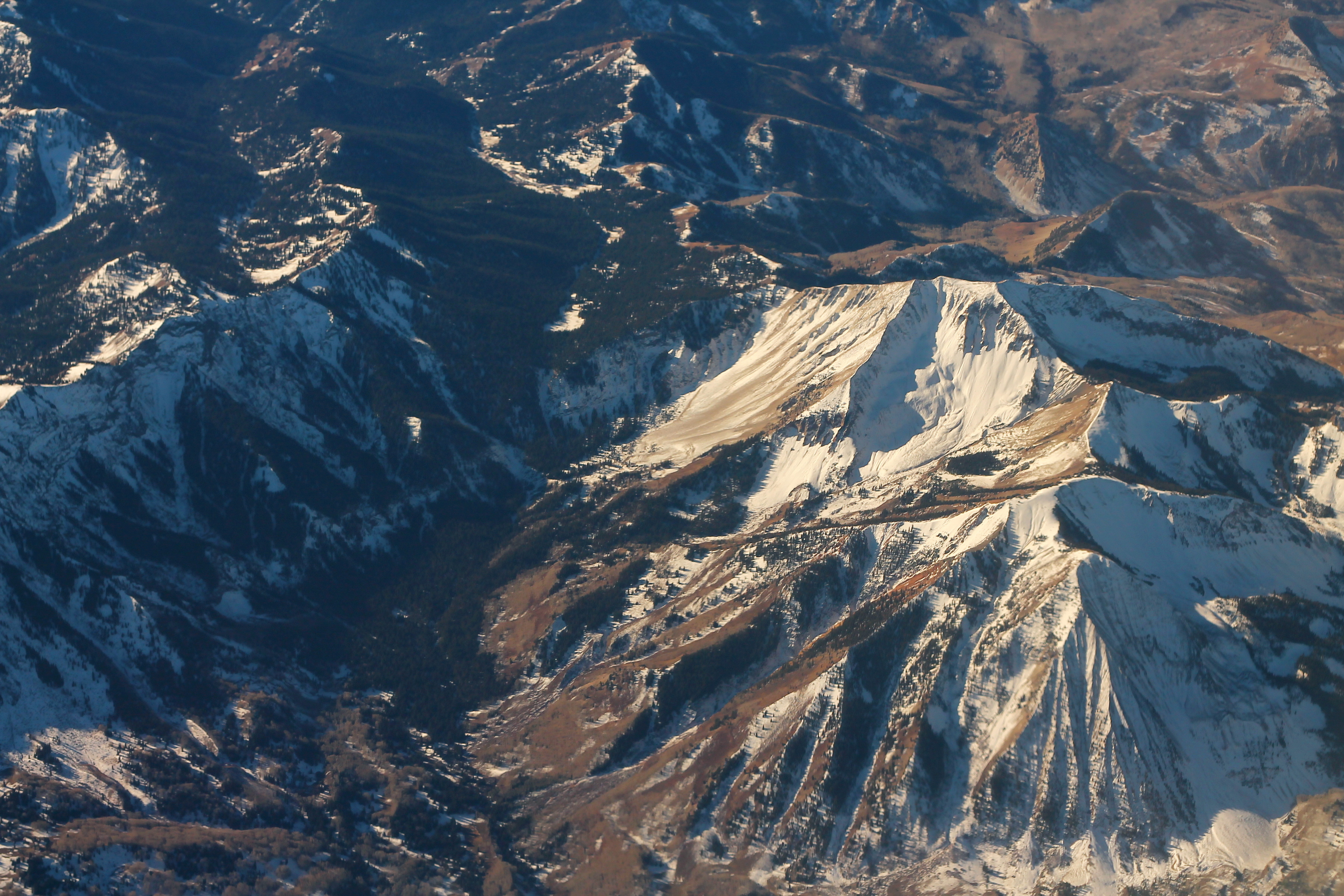
- An aerial photograph of Mount Guero with Sheep Mountain

Highest point
- Elevation: 12,058 ft (3,675 m)
- Prominence: 2,432 ft (741 m)
- Isolation: 6.38 mi (10.27 km)
- Listing: Colorado prominent summits
- Coordinates: 38°43′11″N 107°23′10″W

Geography
- Location within Colorado
- Location: Gunnison County, Colorado, U.S.
- Parent range: West Elk Mountains
- Topo map(s): USGS 7.5' topographic map Mount Guero, Colorado

Climbing
- Easiest route: hike

Mount Guero is a prominent mountain summit in the West Elk Mountains range of the Rocky Mountains of North America. The 12,058-foot (3,675 m) peak is located in the West Elk Wilderness of the Gunnison National Forest, 13 miles (21 km) east of Crawford, Colorado in Delta County and 24.3 miles (39.1 km) west-southwest (bearing 245°) of the Town of Crested Butte in Gunnison County, Colorado, United States.

== See also ==
- List of Colorado mountain ranges
- List of Colorado mountain summits
  - List of Colorado fourteeners
  - List of Colorado 4000 meter prominent summits
  - List of the most prominent summits of Colorado
- List of Colorado county high points
