= East Beckwith Mountain =

Mountain in Colorado, United States

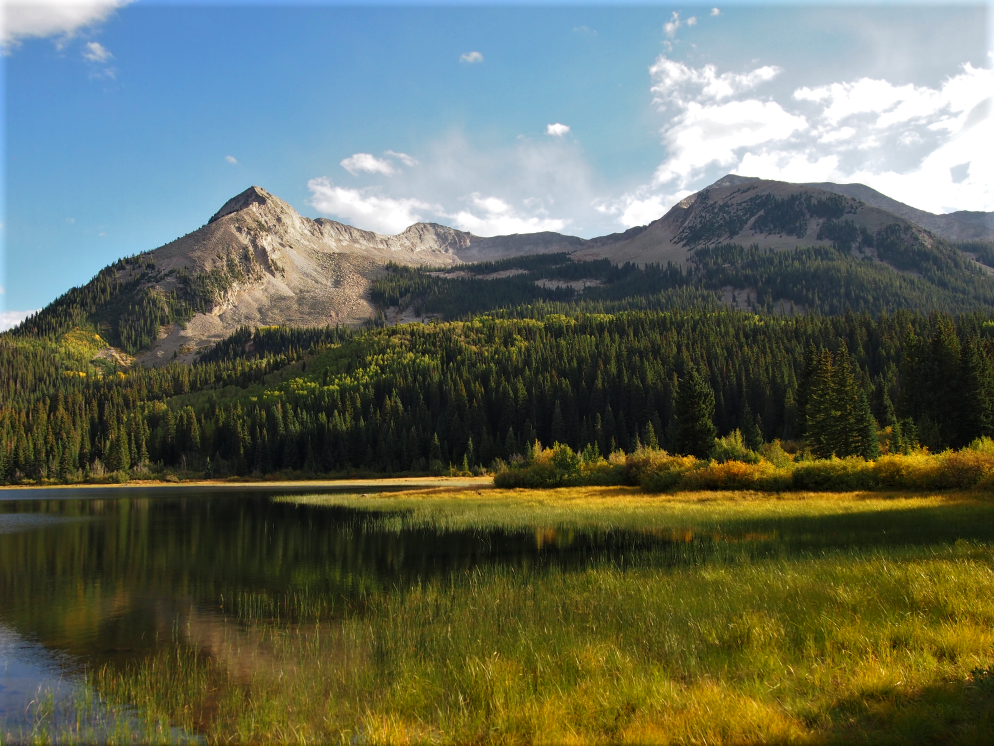
- East Beckwith Mountain viewed from the northeast. The high point is the summit on the right.

Highest point
- Elevation: 12,441 ft (3,792 m)
- Prominence: 2,492 ft (760 m)
- Isolation: 6.24 mi (10.04 km)
- Listing: Colorado prominent summits
- Coordinates: 38°50′47″N 107°13′24″W

Geography
- Location within Colorado
- Location: Gunnison County, Colorado, U.S.
- Parent range: West Elk Mountains
- Topo map(s): USGS 7.5' topographic map Anthracite Range, Colorado

Climbing
- Easiest route: hike

East Beckwith Mountain is a prominent mountain summit in the West Elk Mountains range of the Rocky Mountains of North America. The 12,441-foot (3,792 m) peak is located in the West Elk Wilderness of Gunnison National Forest, 13.4 miles (21.5 km) west by south (bearing 264°) of the Town of Crested Butte in Gunnison County, Colorado, United States.

== Geology ==
East Beckwith Mountain is a laccolith, formed when magma intruded into Mancos Shale approximately 30 million years ago. Subsequently, the softer, overlying sedimentary rock has eroded away, exposing the more resistant igneous rock. East Beckwith Mountain is one of over a dozen laccoliths in the West Elk and adjacent Elk Mountains. Of these laccoliths, East Beckwith Mountain is noted for its distinctive glacial landforms. On the north side of this elongated, east–west oriented mountain, there are five glacially carved cirques with intervening arêtes, and moraines fan out from the mountain's base.

== Historical names ==
- East Beckwith Mountain
- Mount Beckwith

== See also ==
- West Beckwith Mountain
- List of Colorado mountain ranges
- West Elk Mountains
