= Mount Gunnison =

Mountain in the state of Colorado

- Location within Colorado

Highest point
- Elevation: 12,725 ft (3,879 m)
- Prominence: 3,539 ft (1,079 m)
- Isolation: 11.84 mi (19.05 km)
- Listing: Colorado prominent summits
- Coordinates: 38°48′43″N 107°22′58″W

Naming
- Etymology: John Williams Gunnison

Geography
- Location: Gunnison County, Colorado, U.S.
- Parent range: West Elk Mountains
- Topo map(s): USGS 7.5' topographic map Minnesota Pass, Colorado

Mount Gunnison is a prominent mountain summit in the West Elk Mountains range of the Rocky Mountains of North America. The 12,725-foot (3,879 m) peak is located in the West Elk Wilderness of Gunnison National Forest, 22.2 miles (35.7 km) west by south (bearing 260°) of the Town of Crested Butte in Gunnison County, Colorado, United States. The mountain is named in honor of John Williams Gunnison who explored the area.

== See also ==
- List of Colorado mountain ranges
- List of Colorado mountain summits
  - List of Colorado fourteeners
  - List of Colorado 4000 meter prominent summits
  - List of the most prominent summits of Colorado
- List of Colorado county high points
