= Carbon Peak =

Mountain in Colorado, United States

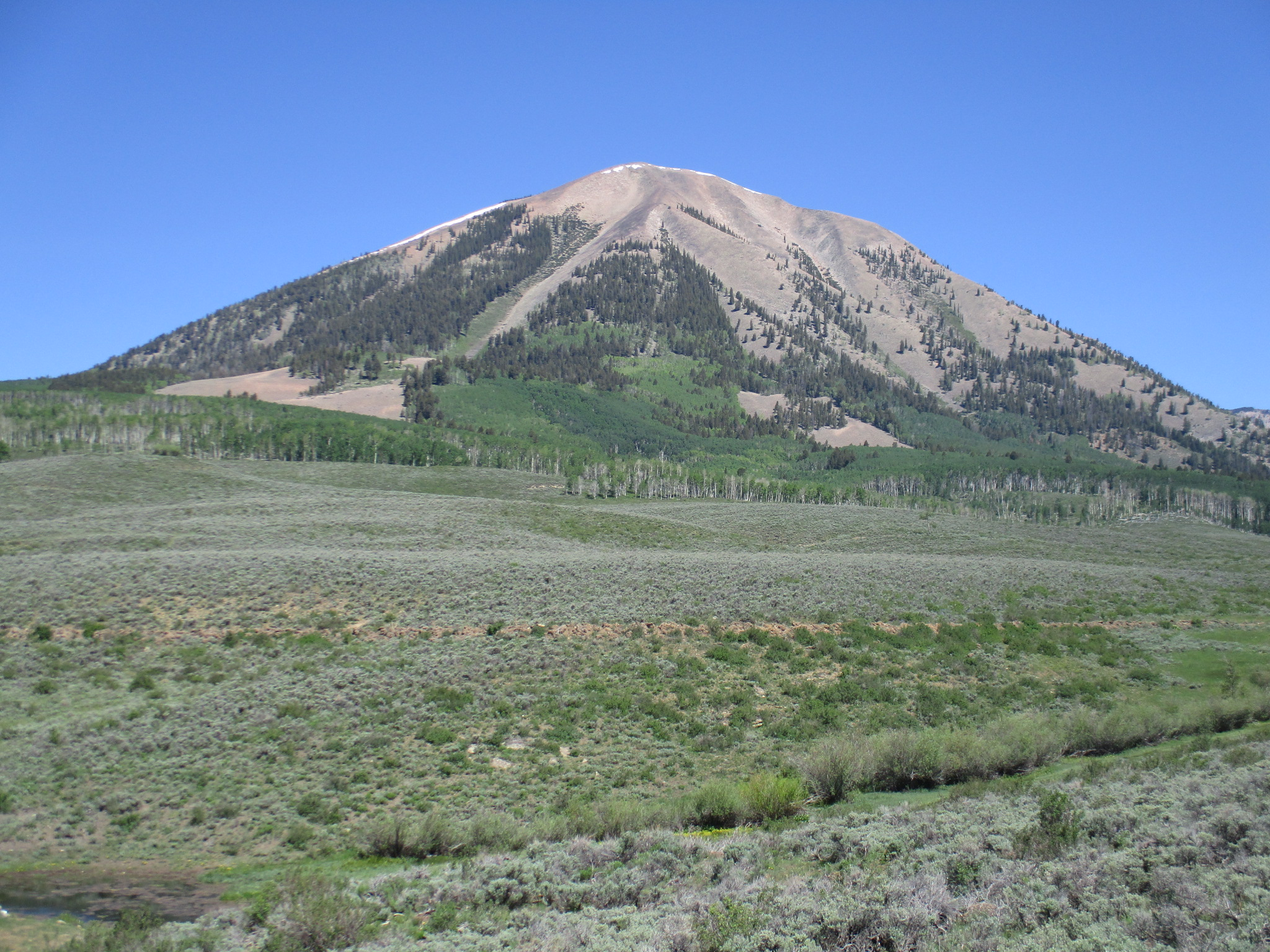
- Carbon Peak

Highest point
- Elevation: 12,088 ft (3,684 m) NAVD 88
- Prominence: 2,159 ft (658 m)
- Listing: Colorado prominent summits
- Coordinates: 38°47′39″N 107°02′35″W

Geography
- Location within Colorado
- Location: Gunnison County, Colorado, U.S.
- Parent range: West Elk Mountains
- Topo map: USGS Mount Axtell

Climbing
- Easiest route: hike

Carbon Peak, elevation 12,088 ft (3,684 m), is a summit in the West Elk Mountains of Colorado. The peak is southwest of Crested Butte in the Gunnison National Forest. Carbon Peak is one of several prominent laccoliths found in the West Elk Mountains.

== Geology ==
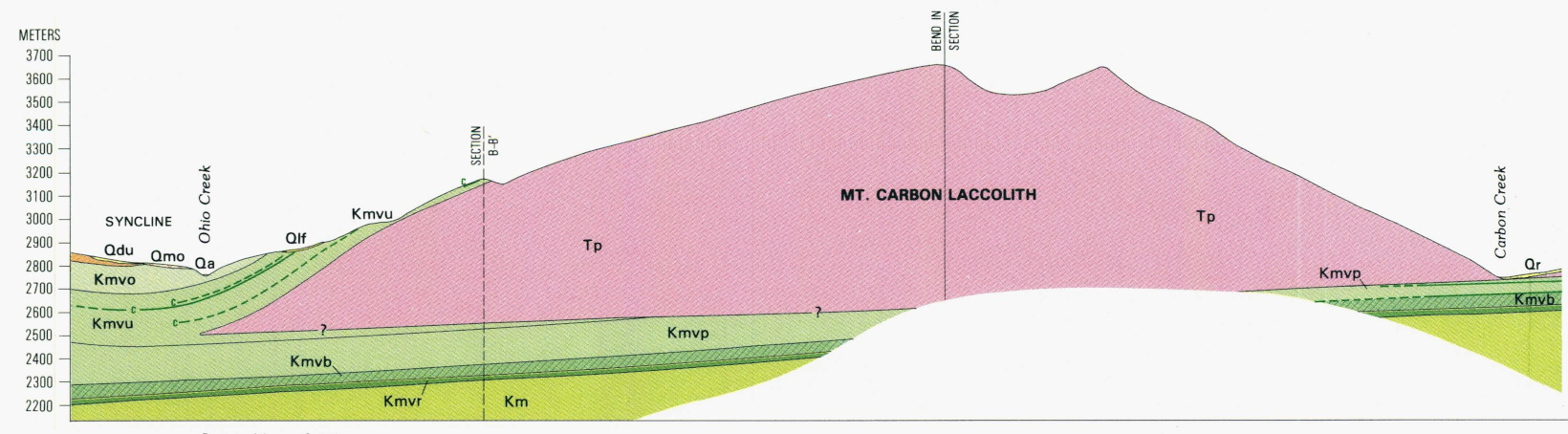
Geologic cross section of Carbon Peak.

Carbon Peak is a laccolith, formed when magma intruded into sedimentary strata of the Mesaverde Formation approximately 30 million years ago. Subsequent erosion has removed the softer, overlying sedimentary rock thereby exposing the more resistant igneous rock that characterizes the mountain today. The mountain is composed of quartz monzonite porphyry and granodiorite porphyry. Carbon Peak was glaciated, and the most prominent glacial cirque is located on the north side of the mountain.

Carbon Peak, along with adjacent Carbon Creek, are named after the coal (a carbon-rich rock) found in the Mesaverde Formation at the base of this and nearby laccoliths.

== See also ==
- Mountain peaks of Colorado
- Mountain ranges of Colorado
