= West Elk Peak =

Mountain in west-central Colorado, US

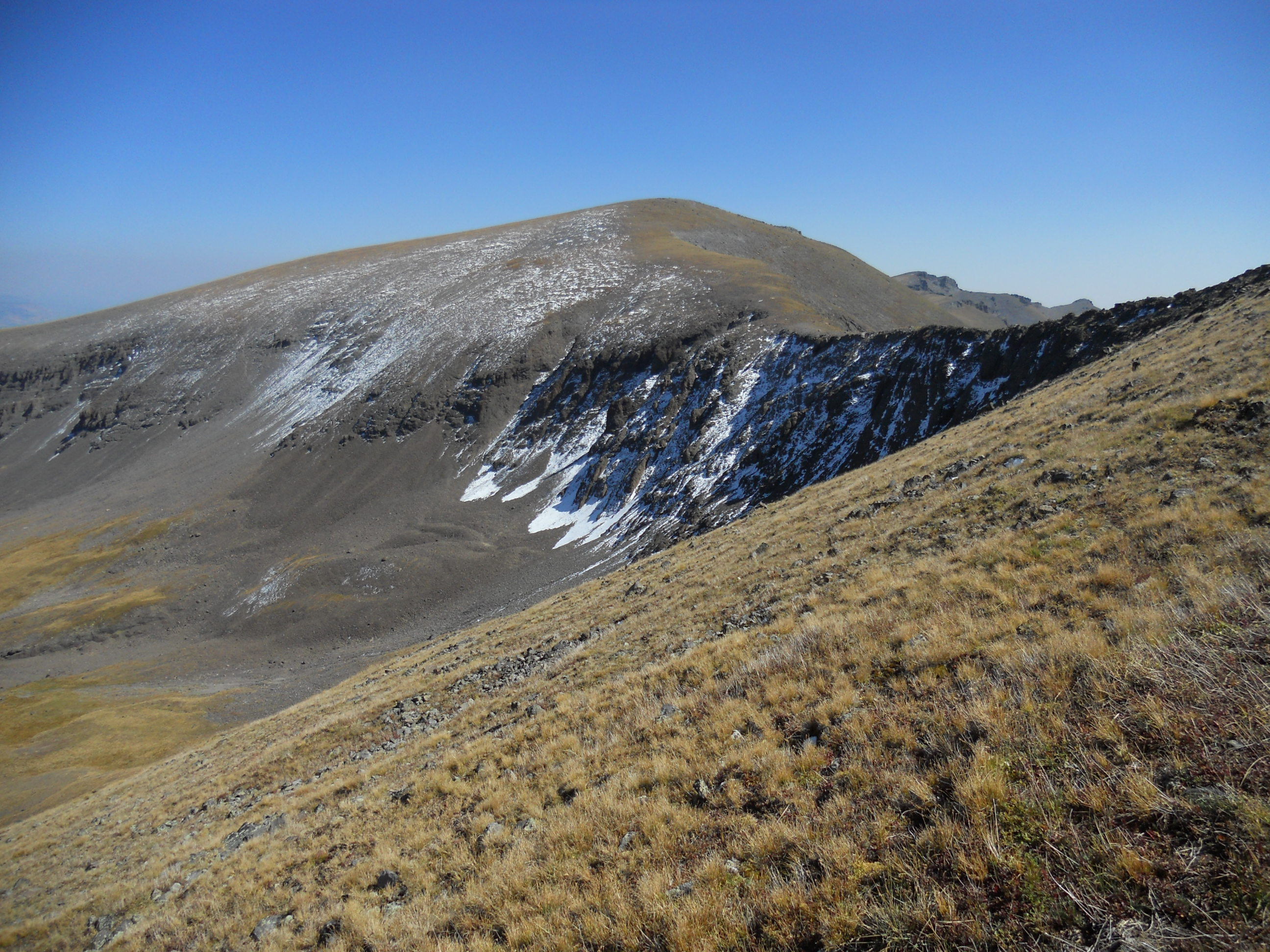
- West Elk Peak

Highest point
- Elevation: 13,042 ft (3,975 m)
- Prominence: 3,095 ft (943 m)
- Isolation: 13.78 mi (22.18 km)
- Listing: Colorado prominent summits Colorado range high points
- Coordinates: 38°43′04″N 107°11′58″W

Geography
- Location within Colorado
- Location: Gunnison County, Colorado, U.S.
- Parent range: Highest summit of the West Elk Mountains
- Topo map(s): USGS 7.5' topographic map West Elk Peak, Colorado

West Elk Peak, elevation 13,042 ft (3,975 m), is the highest summit in the West Elk Mountains of Gunnison County, Colorado. The mountain is in the West Elk Wilderness, northwest of Gunnison.

== Geology ==
The decipherable known geological history of this peak began in the late Paleozoic, where it formed into the eastern edge of the Uncompahgre highland. Around 10,000 to 15,000 feet of sediment covered the old highland surface in the Mesozoic and early Cenozoic. During the Oligocene, the Colorado mineral belt began to form with the intrusion of two batholiths. One of these batholiths rose sufficiently near the surface, enough to feed volcanoes in the West Elk and San Juan Mountains. The resulting volcanic pile has been subjected to intermittent, occasional uplift as well as being shaped by water and ice. The terrain consists mostly of volcanic breccia, known in this area as West Elk Breccia, dated at 35 to 30 million years old. Mineral deposits are somewhat scarce in the surrounding area of the peak, but bituminous coal has been mined on the northern and eastern flanks.

== Historical names ==
- West Elk Mountain
- West Elk Peak

== See also ==
- List of Colorado mountain ranges
- List of Colorado mountain summits
  - List of Colorado fourteeners
  - List of Colorado 4000 meter prominent summits
  - List of the most prominent summits of Colorado
- List of Colorado county high points
- The Castles
