= Marcellina Mountain =

Mountain in Colorado, United States

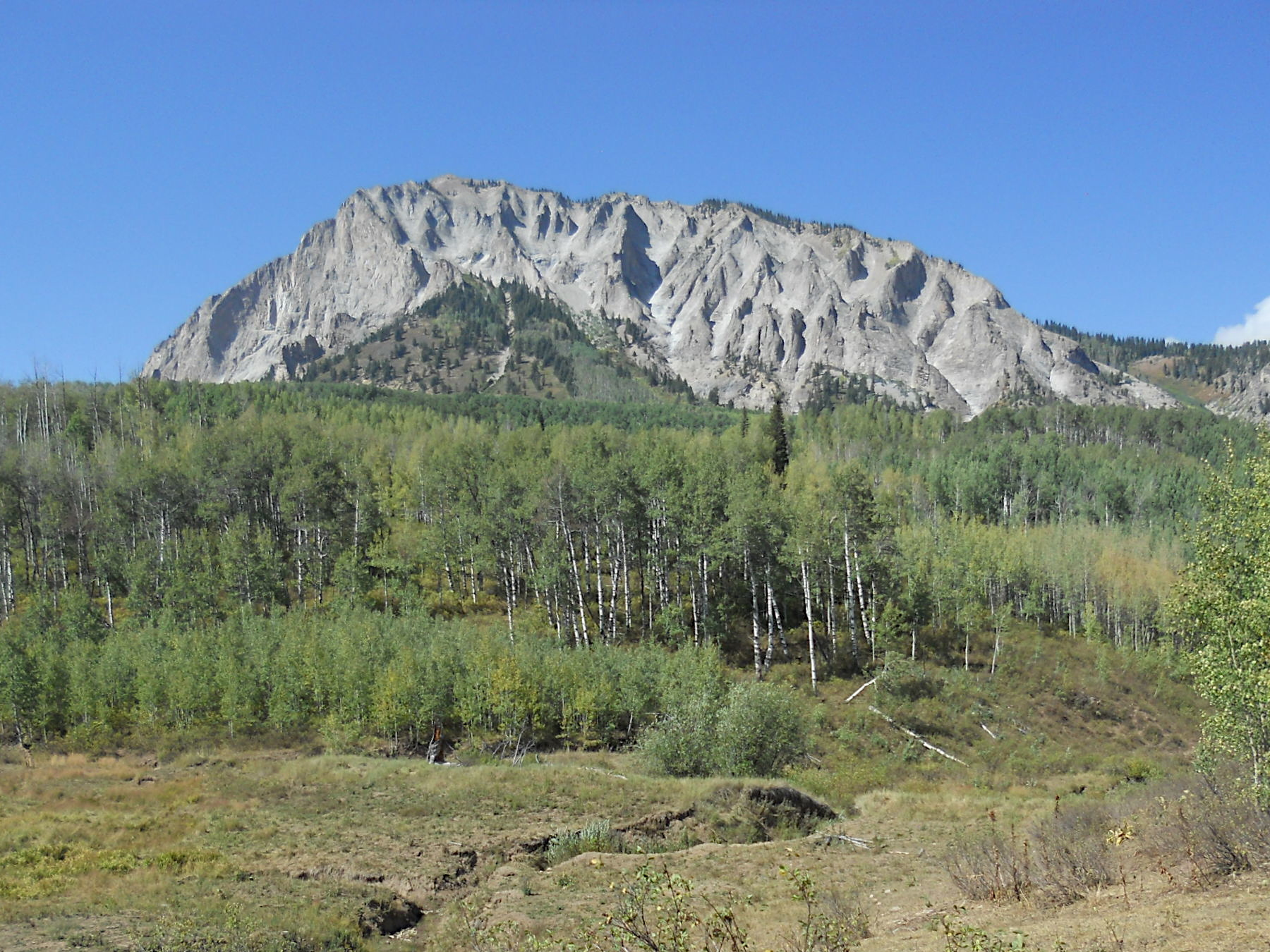
- Marcellina Mountain

Highest point
- Elevation: 11,353 ft (3,460 m)
- Prominence: 2,728 ft (831 m)
- Isolation: 5.08 mi (8.18 km)
- Listing: Colorado prominent summits
- Coordinates: 38°55′48″N 107°14′38″W

Geography
- Location within Colorado
- Location: Gunnison County, Colorado, U.S.
- Parent range: West Elk Mountains
- Topo map(s): USGS 7.5' topographic map Marcellina Mountain, Colorado

Marcellina Mountain is a prominent mountain summit in the West Elk Mountains range of the Rocky Mountains of North America. The 11,353-foot (3,460 m) peak is located in the Raggeds Wilderness of Gunnison National Forest, 15.0 miles (24.1 km) west by north (bearing 287°) of the Town of Crested Butte in Gunnison County, Colorado, United States.

== See also ==
- List of Colorado mountain ranges
- List of Colorado mountain summits
  - List of Colorado fourteeners
  - List of Colorado 4000 meter prominent summits
  - List of the most prominent summits of Colorado
- List of Colorado county high points
