= Whetstone Mountain =

Mountain in Colorado, United States

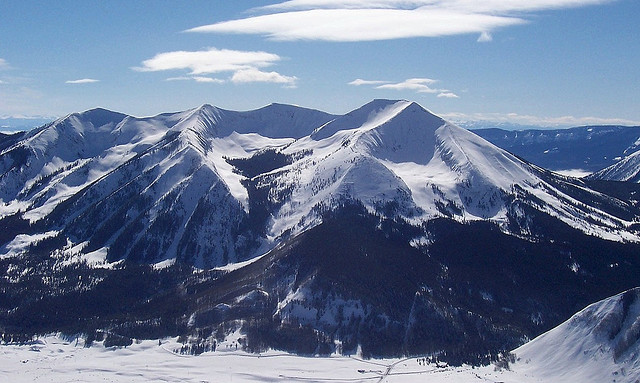

Highest point
- Elevation: 12,527 ft (3,818 m)
- Prominence: 2,456 ft (749 m)
- Isolation: 9.39 mi (15.11 km)
- Listing: Colorado prominent summits
- Coordinates: 38°49′20″N 106°58′48″W

Geography
- Location within Colorado
- Location: Gunnison County, Colorado, United States
- Parent range: West Elk Mountains
- Topo map(s): USGS 7.5' topographic map Crested Butte, Colorado

Climbing
- Easiest route: hike

Whetstone Mountain, elevation 12,527 ft (3,818 m), is a summit in the Gunnison National Forest of western Colorado. The mountain is located 3 mi (4.8 km) south of Crested Butte in Gunnison County. Whetstone Mountain is one of several prominent laccoliths found in the West Elk Mountains.

== Geology ==
Whetstone Mountain is a laccolith, formed when magma intruded into sedimentary strata of Mancos Shale and the Mesaverde Formation approximately 30 million years ago. Subsequent erosion has removed the softer, overlying sedimentary rock thereby exposing the more resistant igneous rock that characterizes the mountain today. The mountain is composed of quartz monzonite porphyry and granodiorite porphyry. Whetstone Mountain was glaciated, and the most prominent glacial cirques are located on the north side of the mountain.

The mountain's name stems from rock collected in the area by the Hayden Survey during the early 1870s. Whetstones (also called hornfels) are contact metamorphic rocks useful for sharpening tools.

== Historical names ==
- Wheatstone Mountain
- Whetstone Mountain – 1927

== See also ==
- List of Colorado mountain ranges
- List of Colorado mountain summits
  - List of Colorado fourteeners
  - List of Colorado 4000 meter prominent summits
  - List of the most prominent summits of Colorado
- List of Colorado county high points
