= Ohio Creek =

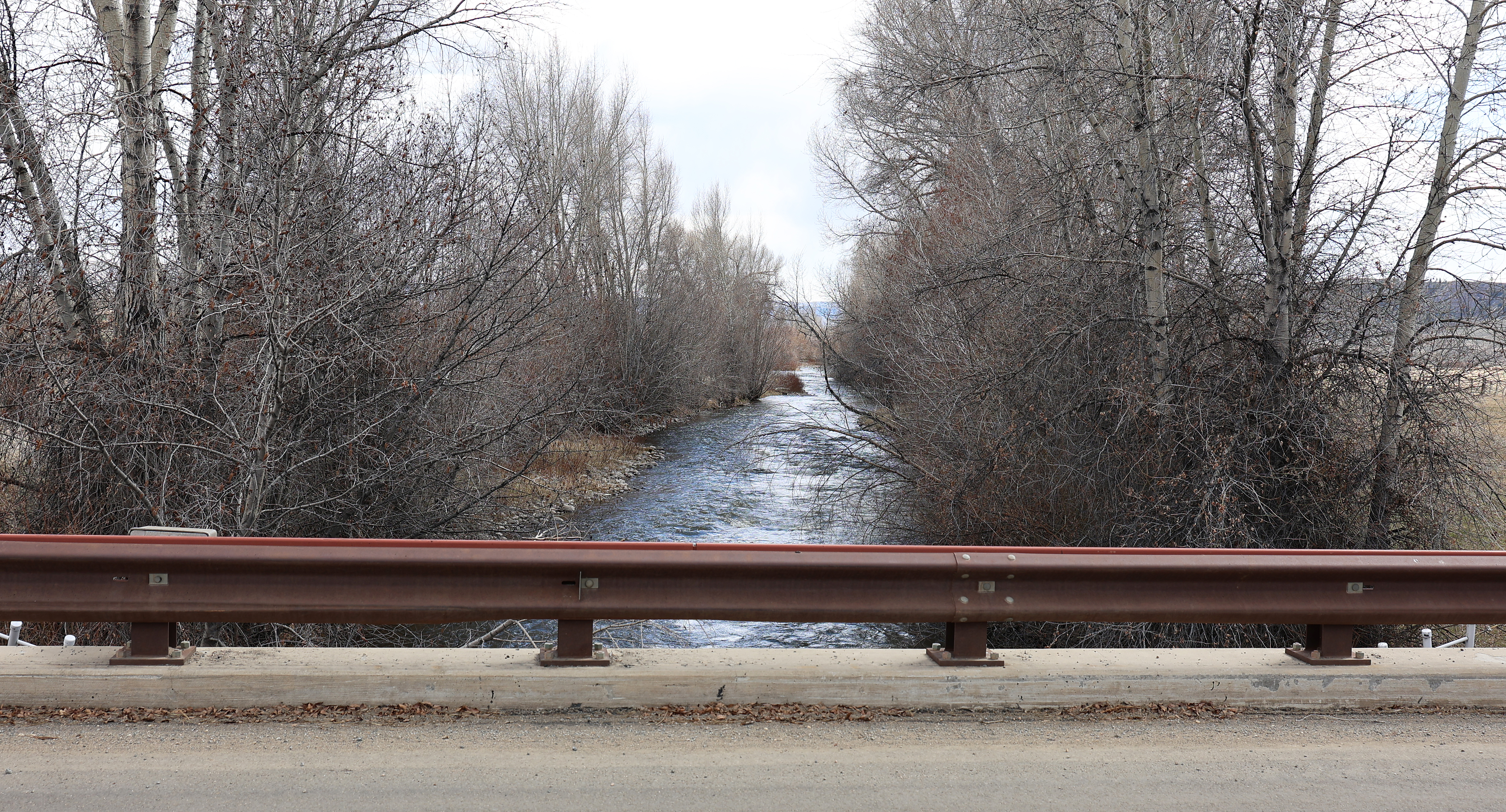
- The creek viewed from a bridge on Castle Mountain Road

- Location of the creek's mouth in Colorado

Physical characteristics
- Source
  - location: Near Ohio Pass in Gunnison County, Colorado
  - coordinates: 38°50′1.98″N 107°5′27.17″W
- Mouth
  - location: near Gunnison, Colorado
  - coordinates: 39°34′22.97″N 106°56′17.16″W
  - elevation: 7,737 feet (2,358 meters)
- Length: 21 miles (34 kilometers)

Basin features
- Progression: Gunnison River—Colorado River
- Tributaries
  - left: Carbon Creek, Wilson Creek
  - right: Pass Creek, Castle Creek, Price Creek, Middle Creek, Squirrel Creek, Mill Creek

Ohio Creek is a tributary of the Gunnison River in Gunnison County, Colorado. In the Ohio Creek Valley, ditch diversions from the creek supply irrigation water for pasture grass production, both for cattle and horses. A total of 11,680 acres (4,730 hectares) are irrigated using water diverted from the creek or its tributaries.

== Course ==
The creek rises near Ohio Pass in the Gunnison National Forest. From there, it flows generally southeastward until it reaches its confluence with the Gunnison River about 1.5 miles (2.4 kilometers) north of Gunnison.

== Geological formation ==
The Ohio Creek Formation takes its name from the creek.

== See also ==
- List of rivers of Colorado
