= West Elk Mountains =

Mountain in the state of Colorado

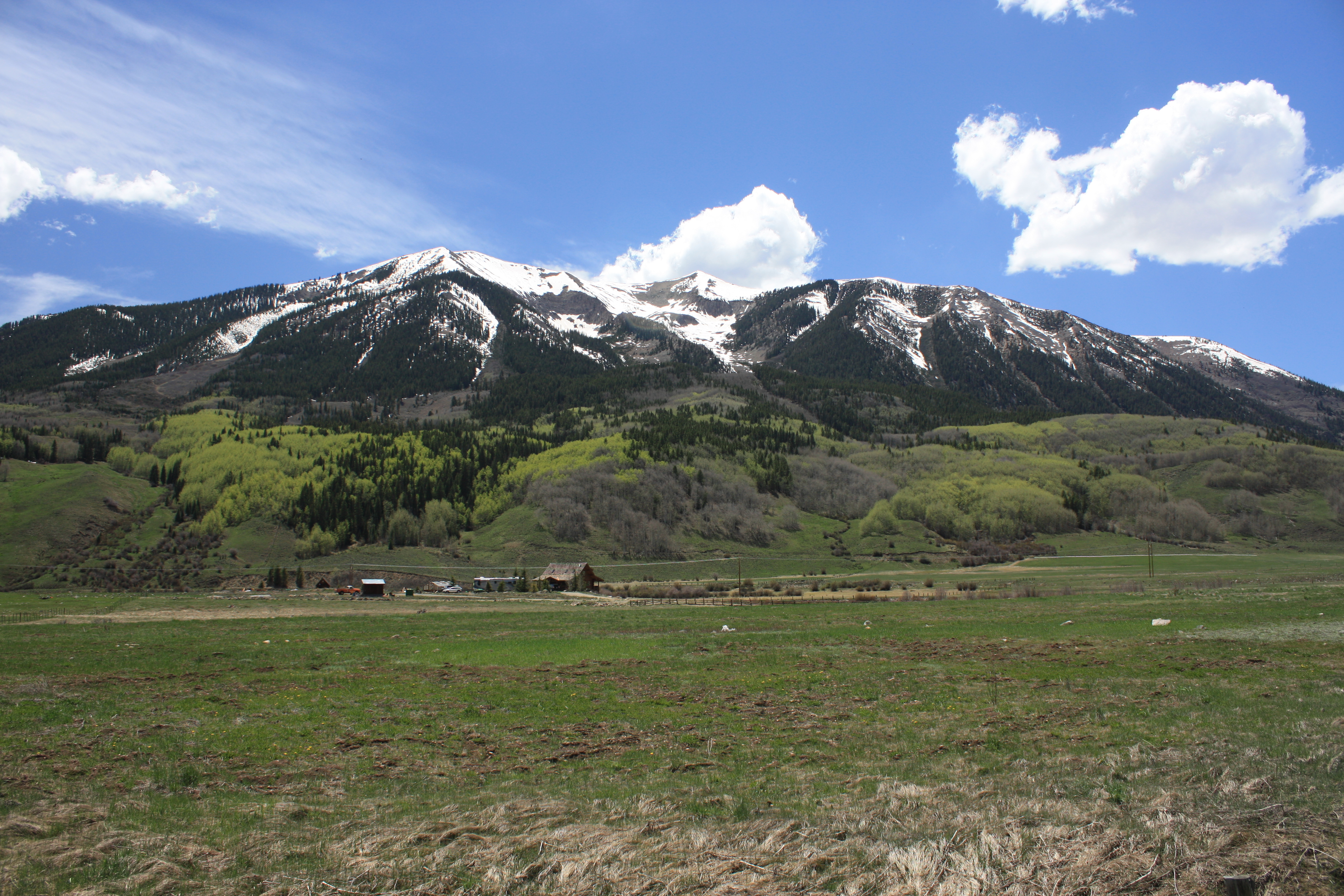
- Whetstone Mountain in the West Elk Mountains

Highest point
- Peak: West Elk Peak
- Elevation: 13,042 ft (3,975 m)
- Coordinates: 38°43′05″N 107°11′57″W

Geography
- Country: United States
- State: Colorado
- Counties: Gunnison, Delta and Montrose
- Parent range: Rocky Mountains
- Borders on: Elk Mountains

The West Elk Mountains are a high mountain range in the west-central part of the U.S. state of Colorado. They lie primarily within the Gunnison National Forest, and part of the range is protected as the West Elk Wilderness. The range is primarily located in Gunnison County, with small parts in eastern Delta and Montrose counties.

The West Elks are surrounded by tributaries of the Gunnison River. The range is bounded on the north by the North Fork of the Gunnison and on the east by the East River, another tributary of the Gunnison. On the south and west it is contiguous with Black Mesa and Fruitland Mesa, both part of the uplift in which sits the Black Canyon of the Gunnison. On the northeast it is contiguous with the Elk Mountains, being separated from them by Anthracite Creek and Coal Creek. Nearby towns include Gunnison, Paonia, and the ski resort of Crested Butte.

== Geology ==
The northern and southern West Elk Mountains have contrasting geologic histories and surface features. In the north, the prominent peaks are laccoliths, formed when magma intruded into Mancos Shale about 30 million years ago. Since then, the overlying Mesozoic sedimentary rock, including the relatively soft Mancos Shale, has eroded away, exposing the laccoliths. Laccoliths in the West Elk Mountains include Marcellina Mountain, Mount Gunnison, East Beckwith Mountain, the Anthracite Range, Mount Axtell, Carbon Peak, and Whetstone Mountain.

In contrast, volcanic rocks dominate the southern portion of the range. Shortly after the laccolith intrusions in the north, volcanic activity began to the south. A large stratovolcano and other vents ejected material that accumulated over what is now the southern West Elk Mountains. Most of these volcanic rocks are included in the West Elk Breccia Formation, a heterogeneous collection of volcanic materials including extensive mudflow deposits. West Elk Breccia is in places over 3,500 feet (1,100 m) thick.

On top of the West Elk Breccia, volcanic ash was deposited through repeated eruptions in the San Juan volcanic field to the south. Most of the ash was deposited 26 to 27 million years ago. The resulting rock, tuff, is relatively soft, but the ash landing toward the southern edge of the West Elk volcanic field was hot enough to fuse into harder welded tuff. These welded tuffs are more resistant to weathering than the underlying breccia and today they cap multiple south-sloping mesas in the southern West Elk Mountains.

Erosion has cut valleys and defined the mesas and peaks we see today. The highest point in the West Elk Mountains is West Elk Peak, which is located near the center of the large volcano that once dominated this landscape. Stratigraphic profiles of these rock layers can be seen at the southern edge of the West Elk Mountains where the Gunnison River has eroded through the volcanic strata. A good example can be seen at the Dillion Pinnacles in Curecanti National Recreation Area. The resistant welded tuff that caps Dillon Mesa is on top, overlying the West Elk Breccia, which has eroded into the pinnacles. Exposed under the breccia are the older, underlying Mesozoic sedimentary rocks including the Mancos, Dakota, and Morrison Formations.

== Prominent peaks ==
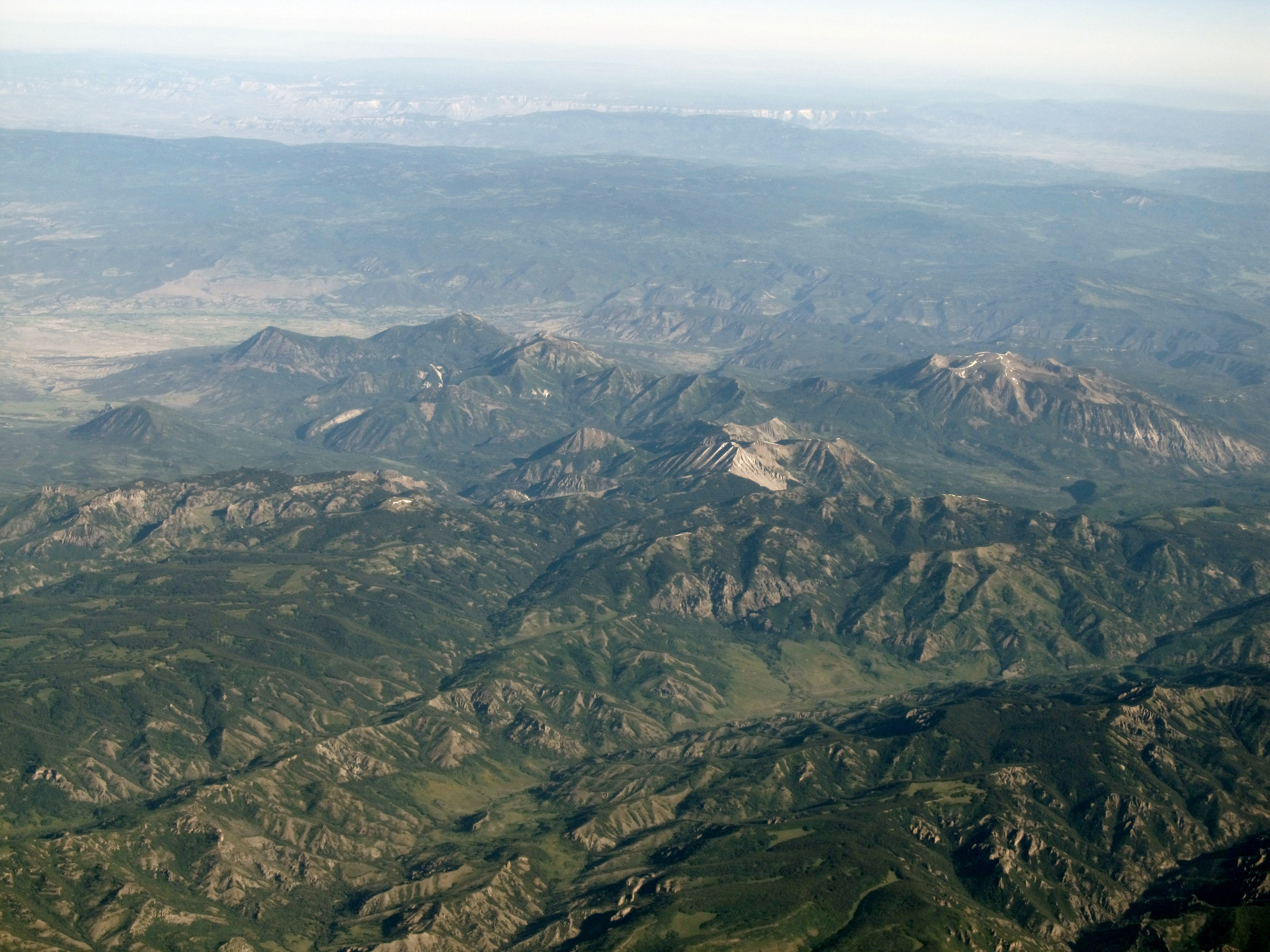
2013 aerial photo

The 9 Peaks of the West Elk Mountains With At Least 500 Meters of Topographic Prominence
Rank	Mountain Peak	Elevation	Prominence	Isolation
1	West Elk Peak NGS PB	13,042 feet 3975 m	3,095 feet 943 m	13.8 miles 22.2 km
2	Mount Gunnison NGS PB	12,725 feet 3879 m	3,549 feet 1082 m	11.8 miles 19.1 km
3	Whetstone Mountain NGS PB	12,527 feet 3818 m	2,456 feet 749 m	9.4 miles 15.1 km
4	East Beckwith Mountain NGS PB	12,441 feet 3792 m	2,492 feet 760 m	6.8 miles 11.0 km
5	Anthracite Range High Point NGS PB	12,394 feet 3778 m	2,125 feet 648 m	4.8 miles 7.7 km
6	Carbon Peak NGS PB	12,088 feet 3684 m	2,179 feet 664 m	3.9 miles 6.3 km
7	Mount Guero NGS PB	12,058 feet 3675 m	2,432 feet 741 m	6.4 miles 10.3 km
8	Coal Mountain PB	11,710 feet 3570 m	1,715 feet 523 m	4.8 miles 7.8 km
9	Marcellina Mountain PB	11,353 feet 3461 m	2,728 feet 831 m	5.1 miles 8.2 km
