= West Elk Wilderness =

Protected area in west-central Colorado, US

- IUCN category Ib (wilderness area)
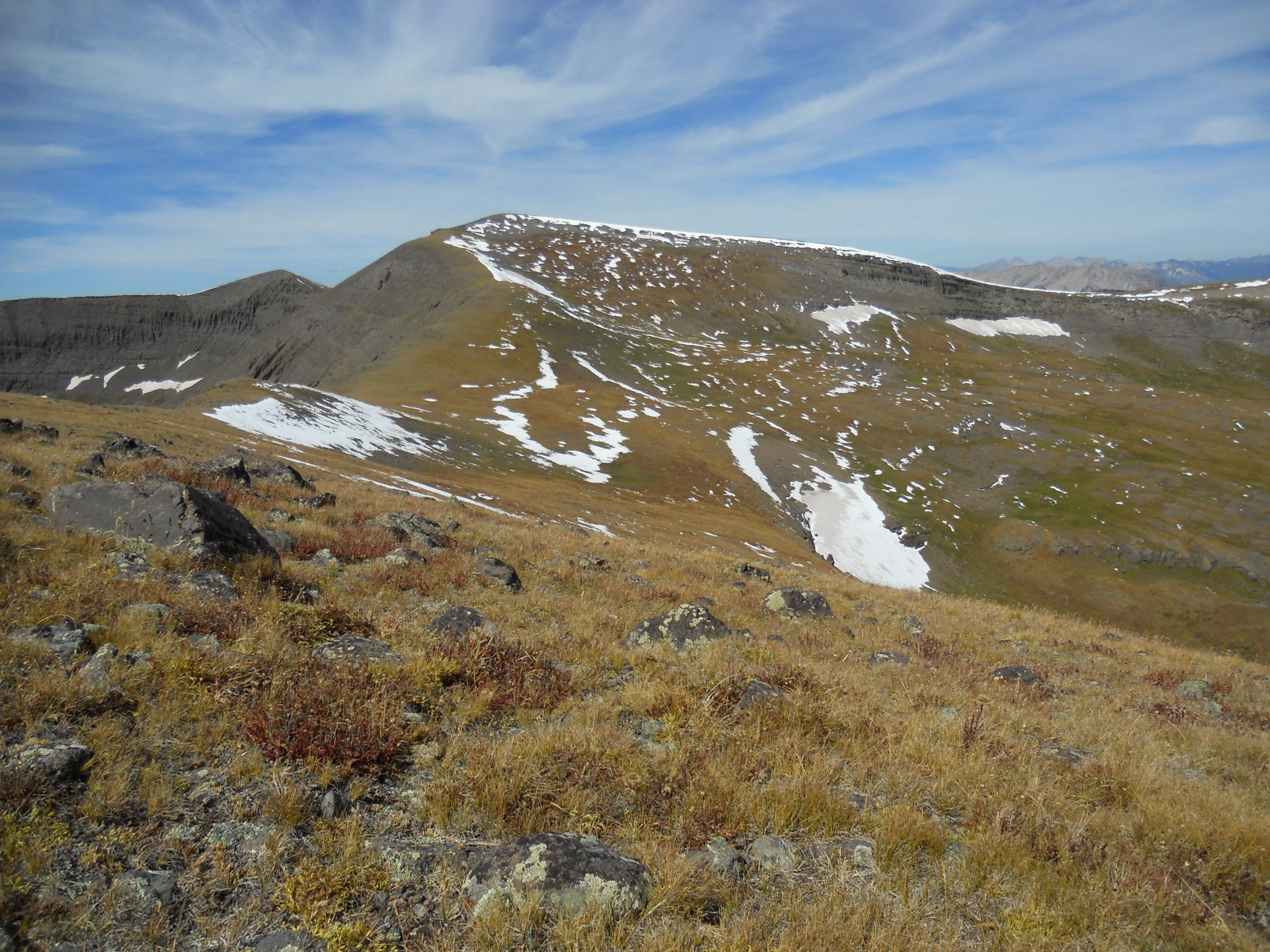
- West Elk Peak is the highest point in the West Elk Wilderness

- Location within the United States
- Location: Gunnison County, Colorado, USA
- Nearest city: Gunnison, CO
- Coordinates: 38.7215196341°N 107.265293934°W
- Area: 176,412 acres (713.91 km^{2})
- Established: 1964
- Governing body: U.S. Forest Service

The West Elk Wilderness is a U.S. Wilderness Area located northwest of Gunnison, Colorado in the West Elk Mountains.

== History ==
The wilderness was established in 1964 and now protects 176,412 acres (713.91 km^{2}) within the Gunnison National Forest.

== Geography ==
Elevations in the wilderness range from 6,800 feet (2,100 m) along Coal Creek to 13,042 feet (3,975 m) at the summit of West Elk Peak. The area supports large elk and deer populations and is busiest during the fall hunting season.
