= Osgood–Kuhnhausen House =

Historic house in Colorado, United States

- U.S. National Register of Historic Places
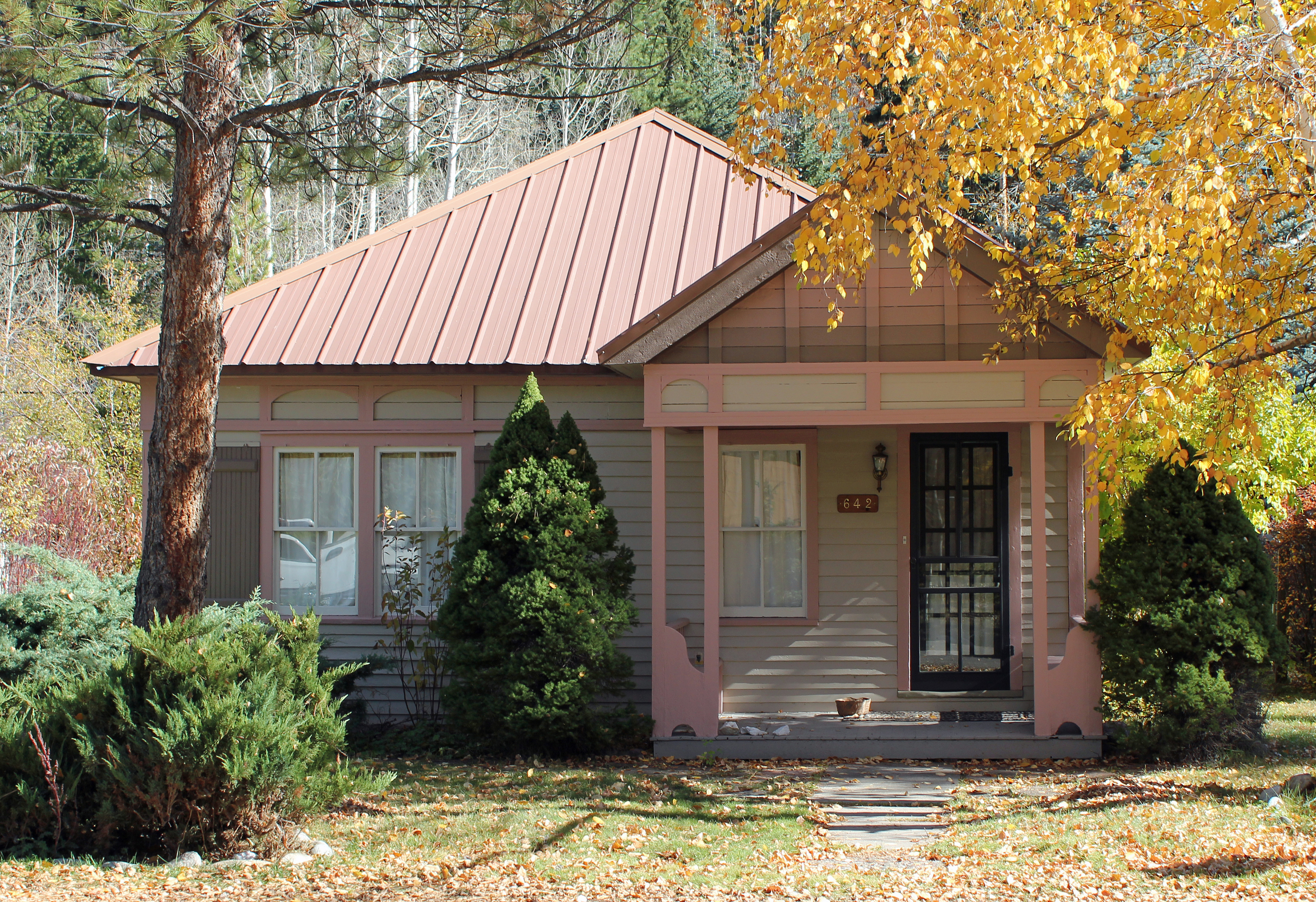
- West elevation, 2011

- Location within Colorado
- Location: Redstone, CO
- Nearest city: Aspen
- Coordinates: 39°11′13″N 107°14′4″W
- Built: 1901
- Architectural style: Tudor Revival
- NRHP reference No.: 83001327
- Added to NRHP: August 18, 1983

The Osgood–Kuhnhausen House, also known as Carina's Cottage, is located on Redstone Boulevard in Redstone, Colorado, United States. It is a timber frame structure built at the beginning of the 20th century in the Tudor Revival architectural style. In 1983 it was listed on the National Register of Historic Places.

Redstone was established at that time by John C. Osgood, founder of the Colorado Fuel and Iron (CF&I) company, one of the largest mining companies in the state. Wanting the coal miners and coking workers at the nearby mines and coke ovens to live in comfortable housing, Osgood built hundreds of cottages as part of his company town. Most were abandoned a decade later when CF&I shut the facilities down, and were eventually demolished or moved. The Kuhnhausen house was one of the few that have remained largely intact on their original sites.

== Building ==
The house is located near the north end of the unincorporated community of Redstone. It is on the east side of Redstone Boulevard, a few lots south of where East Creek Trail rejoins the street from the east and the pavement ends. On the neighboring lots on both sides of the street are houses of more modern construction. To the west the lots back on the Crystal River, beyond which is State Highway 133 and the mountains on the other side of the valley in Grand Mesa National Forest. On the east are also mountain slopes; most of that land is in the White River National Forest's Maroon Bells–Snowmass Wilderness. A quarter-mile (500 m) to the south is the older portion of town at the northern end of the Redstone Historic District, also listed on the National Register.

The building itself is a one-story square-shaped wood frame structure sided in clapboard with a pyramidal metal roof. A small porch projects from the south corner of the west (front) facade; there is a larger, gabled projection on the east. Several mature trees shelter the house; there are shrubs planted in the front.

On the front is a double two-over-two double-hung sash window with battened wooden shutters in the north bay and a single one next to the front door. Wood pillars from benches along either side support the porch's gabled roof. Above the window lintels a pair of wooden courses creates a frieze effect, with arched openings above the windows and the porch support posts. At the roof there is an overhanging eave.

== History ==
During the late 19th century in Colorado and other Western states, miners often built improvised houses or log cabins of wood, sod and whatever leftover materials they could scavenge for themselves and their families near the remote mines they worked at. In addition to being unsightly, they were often of poor quality. Housing became an issue in much of the labor unrest of the era.

In the late 1890s, John C. Osgood began to realize long-held plans of his to mine the high-quality coal of the upper Crystal valley. By 1899 CF&I, his company, had built almost 250 coke ovens along the west side of the river near Coal Creek. Similar dwellings were built nearby, but Osgood thought he could do better.

At the cost of $5 million ($186 million in modern dollars) to the company, he built Redstone. The company town had a dormitory for unmarried workers, lodges, a school, library and firehouse amid more than 80 small wooden cottages with running water and electricity, both luxuries by the standards of mines of that era. Architect Theodore Boal designed all the buildings in various Victorian styles of the era, particularly the Swiss chalet and Tudor Revival modes, adapting them to the mountain setting. Many show the influence of Andrew Jackson Davis's mid-century pattern book, The Architecture of Country Houses.

They were usually one-story buildings painted in soft, pleasing pastel colors. They differed from houses in other mine towns by using horizontal clapboard siding instead of board-and-batten. Many had, like the Osgood–Kuhnhausen house, a large pyramidal or hipped roof with gabled extensions and projections, usually sheltering a porch. While the houses used a standard form to keep costs down, the decorative elements on the Osgood–Kuhnhausen and some other houses suggest the houses were structurally superior enough to allow for the additional expense.

The community was completed in 1903. Osgood lost control of CF&I to interests connected to the Rockefeller family that same year, so he was unable to develop his paternalist model to the extent he originally planned as he founded the Victor American Fuel Company, one of CF&I's chief competitors. In 1909 the mines and coke ovens were shut down when the company found it was no longer profitable to ship coal to its new plant in Pueblo.

Redstone was abandoned very quickly, going from a bustling community of hundreds to a near ghost town almost overnight. In the years afterwards, many of the buildings including the cottages were demolished or moved to other locations. The Osgood–Kuhnhausen House was not, and remained in the family, rented to various remaining miners. A garage was built on the property in 1930.

The Osgoods put a rear addition on the house in 1940, and then sold it to Harry Kuhnhausen in 1945. He sold it to Fred Potter two months later, and his wife joined him on the deed when they married the next year. In 1950 the Potters sold it back to Kuhnhausen and his wife. The only alteration since then has been a metal roof, added in 1981.

== See also ==
- National Register of Historic Places listings in Pitkin County, Colorado
