= Osgood Gamekeeper's Lodge =

Historic house in Colorado, United States

- U.S. National Register of Historic Places
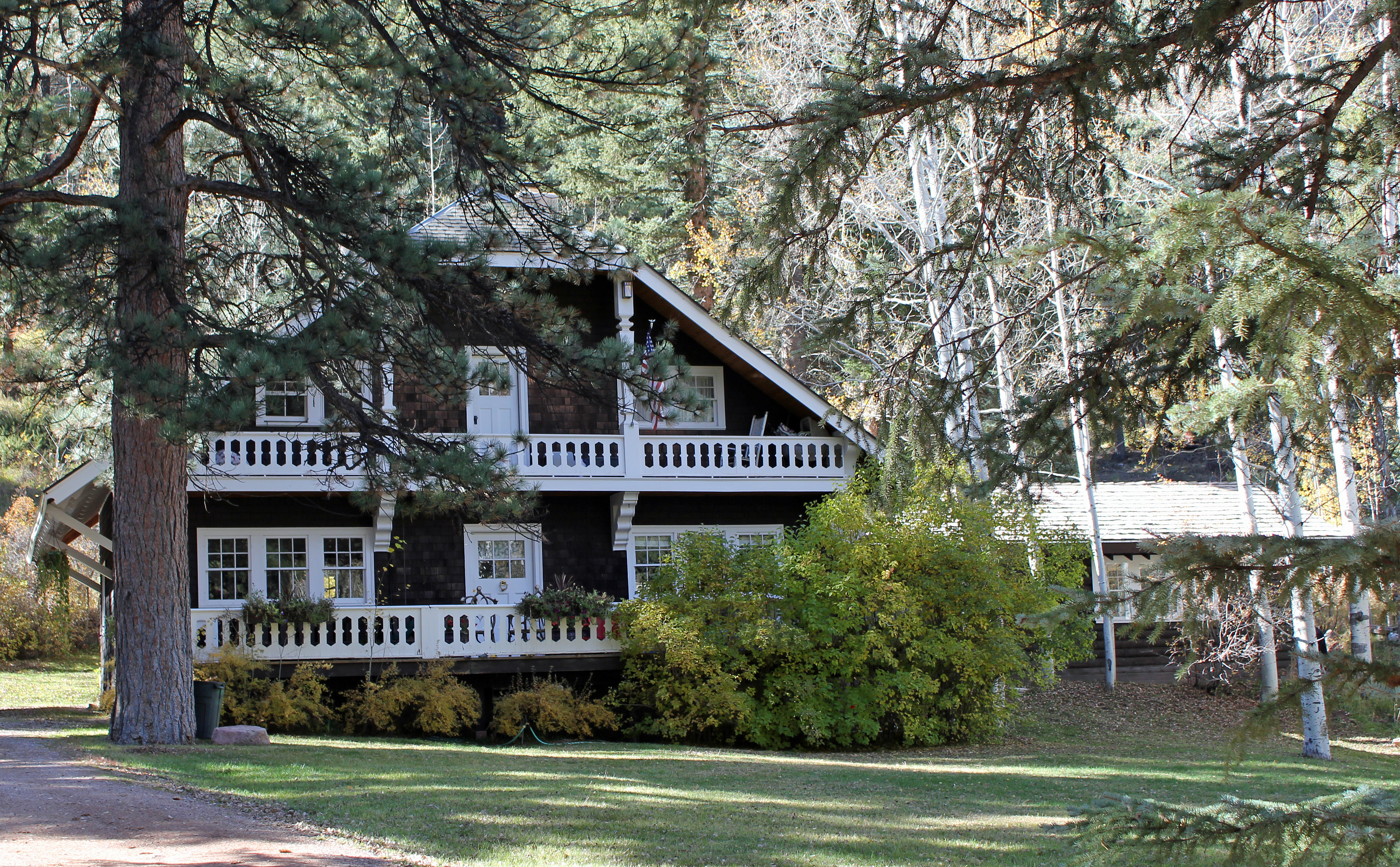
- South (front) elevation, 2011

- Location within Colorado
- Location: Redstone, CO
- Nearest city: Aspen
- Coordinates: 39°10′14″N 107°14′42″W
- Area: 6 acres (2.4 ha)
- Built: 1901
- Architect: Theodore Boal
- Architectural style: Swiss chalet style
- MPS: Historic Resources of Redstone, Colorado
- NRHP reference No.: 89000933)
- Added to NRHP: July 19, 1989

The Osgood Gamekeeper's Lodge is located along State Highway 133 near Redstone, Colorado, United States. It is a timber frame structure built at the beginning of the 20th century. In 1989 it was listed on the National Register of Historic Places.

Architect Theodore Boal designed the house in the Swiss chalet style, one of many in Redstone at that time. He had been commissioned by John C. Osgood, then owner of the Colorado Fuel and Iron (CFI) company, who designed the small community as a company town for the coal miners and other workers CFI employed in the area. Osgood's estate included two large private game preserves for himself and his guests, who included Theodore Roosevelt, John D. Rockefeller and King Leopold II.

Less than a decade after it was built, Redstone was almost completely abandoned. Many of its original houses and cottages were torn down or moved in later decades, even as Redstone itself revived slightly as an arts colony. The gamekeeper's cottage is one of the few outside the village that remain relatively unaltered. It continues to be used as a private residence.

== Buildings and grounds ==
The lodge is on a 6-acre (2.4 ha) complex on the west side of Highway 133, approximately a mile (1.6 km) south of the turnoff to Redstone, at an elevation of 7,280 feet (2,220 m) above sea level. To the east, across the Crystal River, is Osgood Castle, the main building of the mining magnate's estate. On both sides of the valley steep wooded mountain slopes rise to alpine summits as high as 12,000 feet (3,700 m) in White River and Gunnison national forests.

Much of the neighboring land is undeveloped. To the south is a small subdivision along Chair Mountain Road. A quarter-mile (500 m) to the north is another subdivision. The land along the road is open, giving way to forest further back. There is no development between the highway and the river.

An unpaved driveway leads into the property from the road. There are three buildings around its end. The original gamekeeper's lodge is to the north, its carriage house to the west and a modern building to the south. All are sheltered by mature trees, predominantly a mixture of aspen and pine.

The lodge building is a one-and-a-half-story timber frame house sided with wooden shingles stained dark brown. It is topped by a clipped-gable roof with broad overhanging eaves pierced by two chimneys near the center. The lower story has a full-length porch on the south (front) facade, complemented by a balcony above it.

Both the porch and the balcony have full-length saw-cut wooden balustrades. Two large white brackets support the balcony on either side of the main entrance. Next to them on either side are triple six-over-three double-hung sash windows. The main entrance itself has a white paneled wooden door with six-pane window.

Above the brackets two turned spindles rise to the roof. The plainer door to the balcony is flanked by four-over-two double-hung sash. On the east and west elevations, plain brackets support the roof.

The carriage house is similar but more restrained. Its eaves are lower, supported by smaller brackets, with the roof pierced by a large shed dormer on the south side. Entrances are located on the sides, with three modern bay windows between them. The east facade has a similar but shorter balustrade along its balcony.

== History ==
John C. Osgood came to Colorado in 1882 to survey the new state's coal resources for the Chicago, Burlington and Quincy Railroad. He soon established the Colorado Fuel Company to supply it and other railroads with coal mined, initially, by others. His goal was to open mines in the remote Crystal Valley, where he had found high-quality coal suitable for coking during his surveys.

He began buying land in the valley, primarily for the company but also with an eye toward creating an estate for himself. Central to that latter concept was a hunting lodge and game preserves. In 1892 he merged his company with the rival Colorado Coal and Iron Company to form Colorado Fuel and Iron (CF&I), which soon became one of the largest mining concerns in the state and indeed the entire West.

Despite this economic prowess, CF&I was unable to develop the Crystal Valley at first. In the wake of the Panic of 1893, which hit Colorado's mining sector very hard, banks were unwilling to lend the money to build the necessary railroad connection until the closing years of the century. After that was finished, Osgood began implementing his plans.

Like many mine owners of the time, Osgood had a strong dislike for labor unions. He embraced paternal capitalism as an alternative, and planned a company town to be called Redstone, as the center of CF&I's operations in the Crystal Valley. After setting up a large coke oven complex, he hired architect Theodore Boal to design both his estate and the town.

Influenced by the writings of Andrew Jackson Downing earlier in the century, which had led to the Carpenter Gothic movement and other early Victorian styles that tried to harmonize country houses with their natural setting, Boal built primarily in the Tudor Revival and Swiss Chalet styles, the latter of which finds one of its fullest expressions in Redstone in the gamekeeper's cottage.

Both were well-suited to the mountainous surroundings, and Boal adapted them even further to that end. The building's design elements serve both aesthetic and functional purposes. For example, the shingles are as durable as they are rustic and picturesque, per Downing's recommendations. The balcony is not only an element of many actual Swiss chalets, but allowed the gamekeeper to survey the animals in the winter enclosure that would have been before him.

In addition to Osgood's hunting lodge, which eventually became his Cleveholm mansion, Boal designed small cottages for the workers and a dormitory for unmarried miners that is today the Redstone Inn, in the same styles. In addition to being high-quality workmanship, in contrast to the makeshift shacks and cabins that dominated most mining camps of the era, the cottages and dormitory had amenities such as electricity and running water that were considered luxuries at the time by any standard.

For several years Osgood enjoyed the life he had envisioned for himself two decades before. He made daily rounds in the streets of Redstone to hear from his employees how things were going and resolve their complaints. Both he and his Swedish-born wife Alma, an avid outdoorswoman, took advantage of the ample game on the preserves. Their guests, who frequently accompanied them on their hunting expeditions, included John D. Rockefeller, Theodore Roosevelt and King Leopold II of Belgium.

In 1903, interests connected to the Rockefeller family took control of CF&I. Osgood became less involved in the company and a less frequent presence in the valley he had developed. Six years later, CF&I's completion of a new coke plant and economic shifts made Redstone's mines unprofitable, and the town was nearly abandoned within days.

Osgood shut down the estate and game preserves in 1913, leaving the few remaining residents to take care of them. The next year the bitter strike that culminated in the Ludlow massacre demonstrated the unsustainability of the paternalist philosophy that had motivated him to build Redstone. In the mid-1920s he returned to the Crystal Valley, terminally ill. After his death in 1926, his ashes were scattered over the valley per his wish. His widow Lucille tried to redevelop the estate into a resort, but its remoteness and the onset of the Great Depression frustrated those hopes.

Lucille was forced to sell the property in increments to survive. Some of the original buildings, such as the greenhouses, were moved; others were demolished. The gamekeeper's cottage remained, even after she sold the main estate house itself in the early 1940s. By 1949 the barn had been converted for resort use and cottages were built on the neighboring property.

In the 1950s a small log wing was added at the northwest corner. It was joined by a gallery on the lower front in the 1960s. That work also put in new side joists and a concrete foundation. The resort failed, and the house was vacant until 1965, when it reverted to use as a home.

Since then Redstone has experienced a slight revival. The gamekeeper's cottage remains largely unaltered other than the work done in the middle of the 20th century. Its current occupants have remodeled the carriage house and rent it out as overnight lodgings.

== See also ==
- National Register of Historic Places in Pitkin County, Colorado
