= Theodore Davis Boal =

American architect and army officer

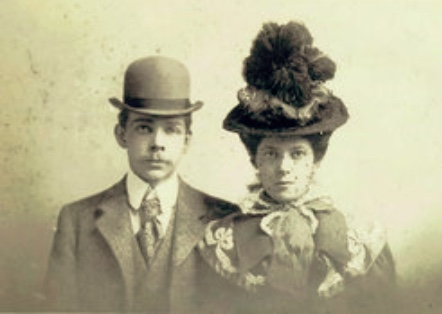
Theodore and Mathilde Boal

Theodore Davis Boal, also known as Terry Boal (June 14, 1867 – August 22, 1938), was an American army officer and architect. He entered into several partnerships over his career, the Boal and Harnois architectural firm in Denver, Colorado and a partnership with Ward Brown in Washington D.C. He designed a number of important mansions that are listed with the National Register of Historic Places. One of his important works, also an NRHP property, is the ancestral family estate, Boal Mansion.

During World War I, Boal and his son volunteered in France before the United States engaged in the war. In 1916, Boal returned to the United States and established the "Boal Troop", a horse-mounted machine gun unit. He was made a Lieutenant Colonel and was awarded the Distinguished Service Cross for valor and the Croix de Guerre in recognition of his service in France.

== Early life and education ==
Boal was born in Iowa City, Iowa on June 14, 1867, to Malvina Amanda (Buttles) Boal and George Jack Boal, who were from wealthy pioneer families. His father was an attorney who also lectured on medical jurisprudence at the Iowa State Medical University. His parents had five children, three of whom lived past infancy, George Buttles, who died at age 17, Theodore, and his brother Montgomery Davis Boal. The family lived in Iowa City, but often traveled to his father's birthplace in Boalsburg, Pennsylvania.

Due to his mother's ill health, he went to live with his Davis relatives in Newport, Rhode Island and New York City during his childhood. He lived with his aunt Annie (Buttles) Davis and his uncle, Egyptologist Theodore M. Davis, for whom he was named. He attended private schools.

In 1887, his parents moved to Denver, where his father worked as an attorney and mining executive for Jerome B. Wheeler. Boal graduated with a degree in architecture from Iowa State University in 1889. He then traveled throughout Europe.

== Business career and life ==
Boal entered into a brief partnership, Hughes and Boal, with Mark T. Hughes in 1890. He opened a practice, Lee and Boal, with Charles Herbert Lee in 1891 at Denver. They designed the Lowell Elementary School in Colorado Springs and the St. Peter's Episcopal Church in Denver. Over three years, Boal spent much of his time traveling and occasionally commissioning his own work. The firm dissolved in 1894.

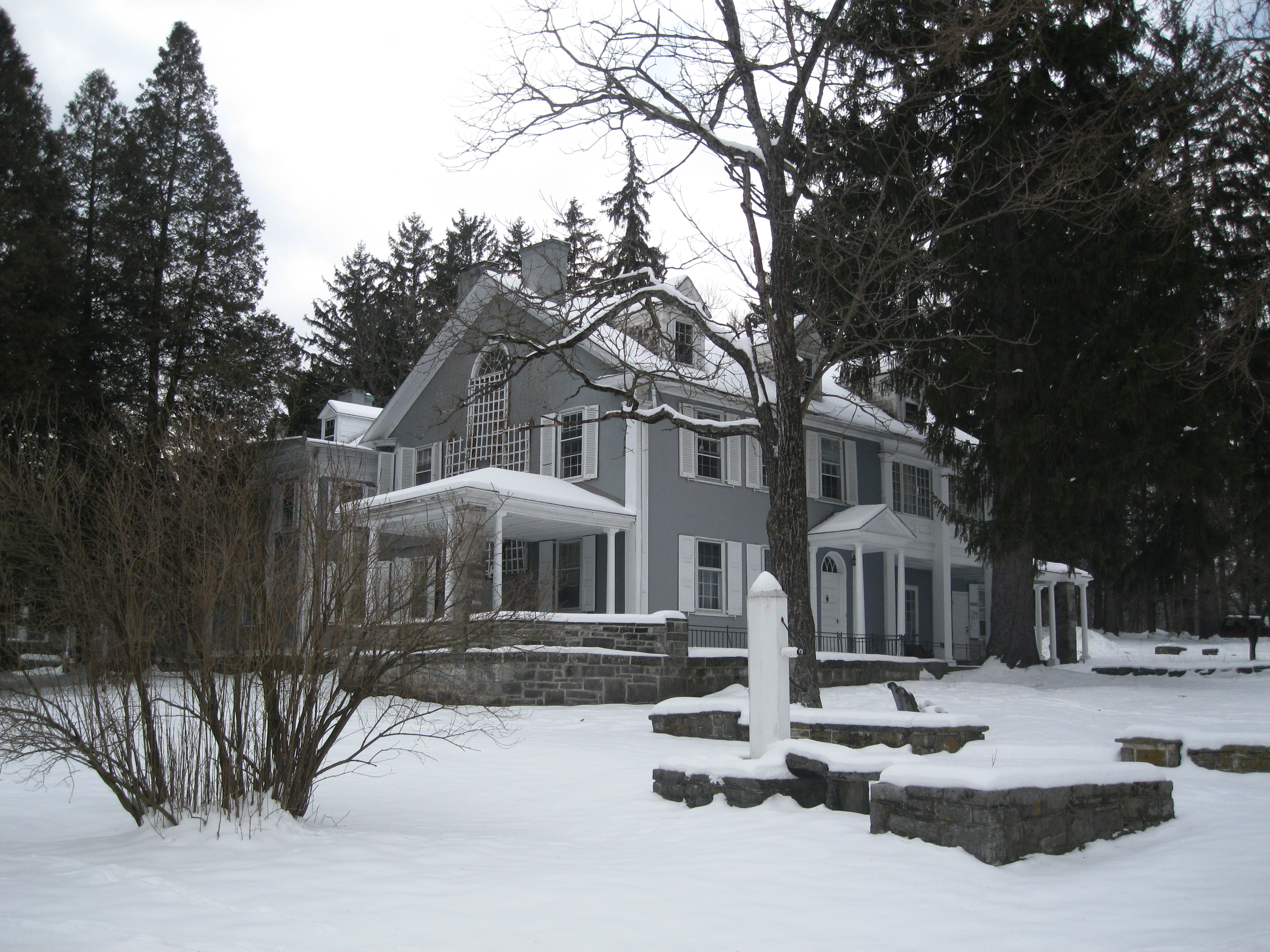
The Boal Mansion is in the village of Boalsburg, in Harris Township, Centre County, Pennsylvania. The house was started in 1789 and expanded between 1898 and 1905. It was listed on the National Register of Historic Places in 1978.

Boal went to France to study architecture at the École des Beaux-Arts de Paris. He met and married Mathilde Denis de LaGarde, an aristocrat, in 1894. Mathilde's aunt had married a descendant of Christopher Columbus giving the family a loose claim to a relationship with the explorer. They lived in Tours de Chignon, France and Boal gave lectures about architecture to professional and society groups over a four-year period. They had one child, Pierre de Lagarde Boal.

In 1898, Boal returned to the United States and established an office in the Equitable Building in Denver. He designed the Ferguson House, which was completed in 1899. Following his father's death in 1895 and his brothers's death in November 1898, Boal returned to the family's Boal Mansion in Boalsburg, Pennsylvania. He made major style changes and additions from 1898 through 1905.

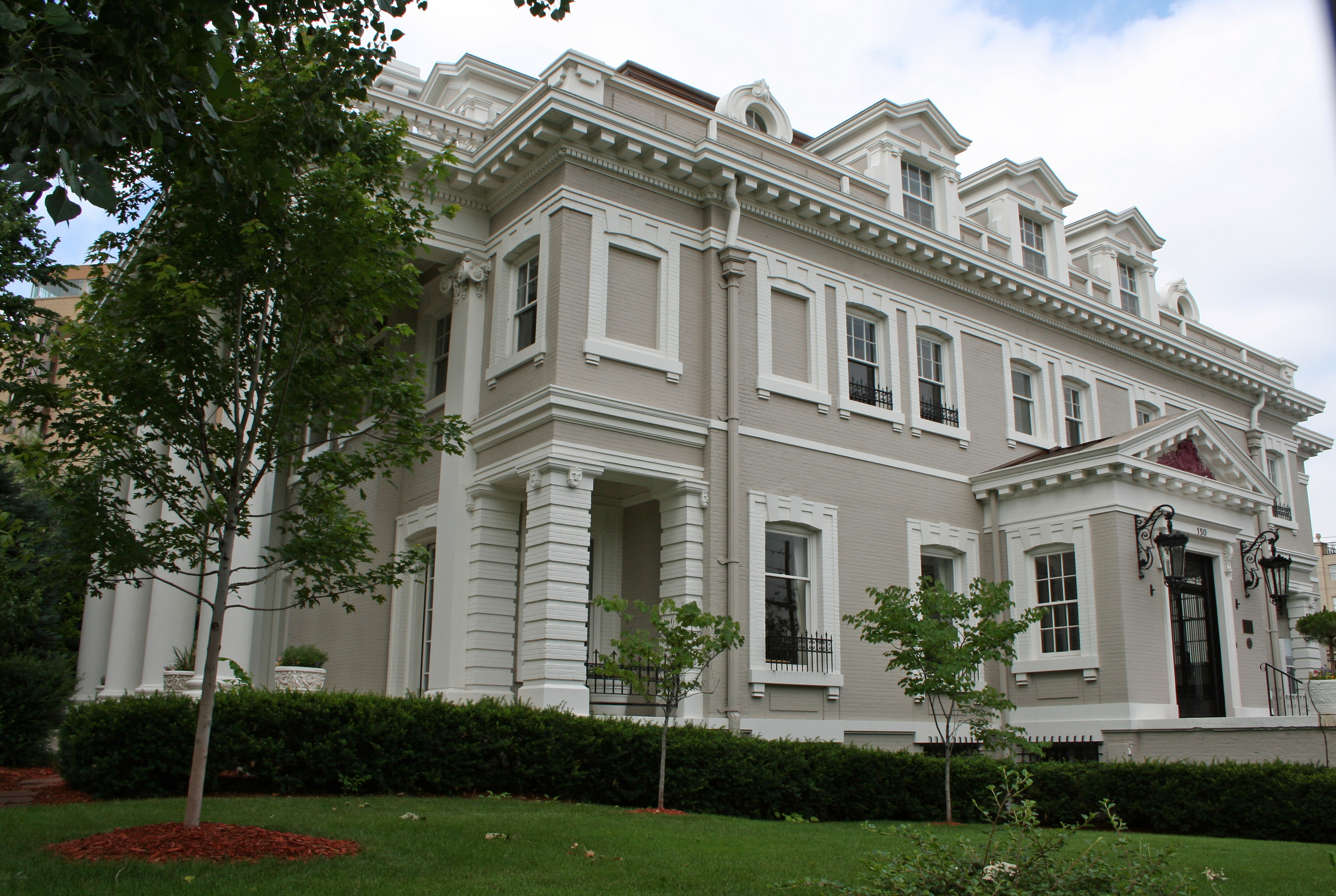
Crawford Hill Mansion, Tenth and Sherman Streets, Denver, Colorado

Boal partnered with Frederick Louis Harnois, Boal and Harnois, which was active from about 1900 to 1907. Between 1899 and 1902, Boal designed the 42-room Redstone Castle in Redstone, Colorado. Boal & Harnois design Crawford Hill Mansion and the Grant–Humphreys Mansion. During that time, Boal lived with his wife, son, and mother in Denver. He then moved to Washington D.C. and was a partner with Ward Brown until 1929. His business activities also included the Boalsburg Water Company (1903–1929), the Boalsburg Electric Company (1915–1932), and Boalsburg Autobus company (1919–1934).

== Columbus Chapel ==
After the death of Victoria Colon (née Montalvo) in 1905, the Boal family inherited the Cristobal Colon (Christopher Columbus) Chapel, which Boal had shipped over in 1909. In addition to the Chapel itself, he acquired numerous other heirlooms including documentation of the Columbus and Torquemada family's records, Baroque and Renaissance oil paintings, an Admiral's Desk believed to have belonged to Columbus himself, and two supposed pieces of the True Cross.

== Military career ==
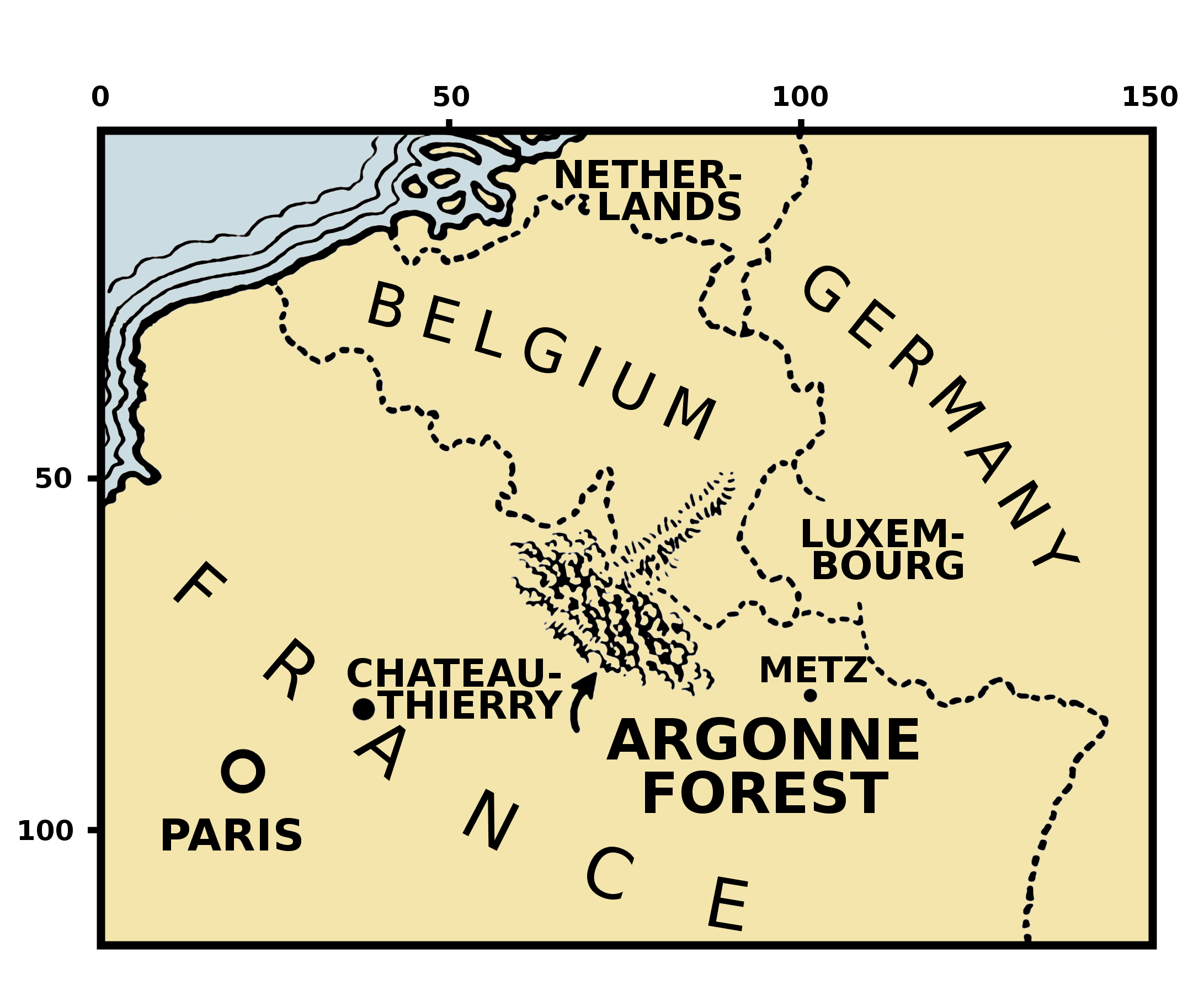
Location of Forest of Argonne in north-eastern France

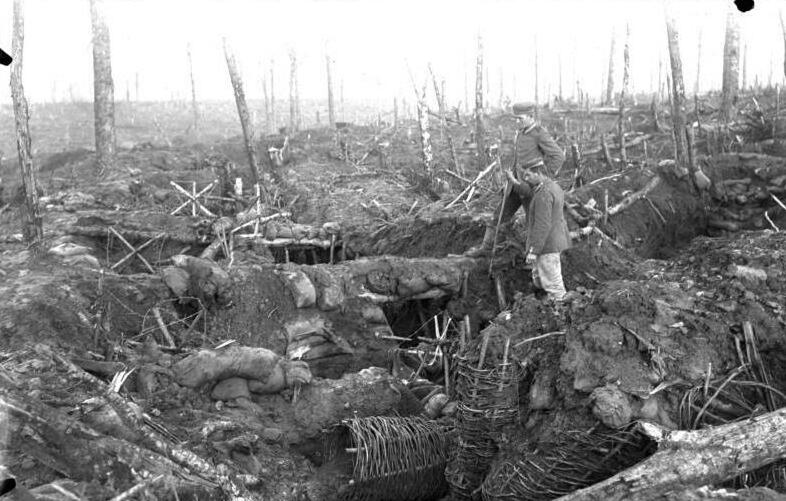
Forest of Argonne in 1915.

In 1914, both he and his son volunteered for service in France. His son joined the cavalry and Boal organized military canteens and donated to French hospitals. Two years later, Boal returned to the United States and formed the "Boal Troop", a horse-mounted machine gun unit which was accepted as a provisional unit of the Pennsylvania Army National Guard. In April 1917, the Boal Troop was reconfigured as an infantry unit, Company A of the 107th Machine Gun Battalion, and deployed to France for service in World War I. Boal served as an aide-de-camp to General Charles M. Clement and later for Major General Charles H. Muir in Pennsylvania's 28th Infantry Division. He was made a Lieutenant Colonel and was awarded the Distinguished Service Cross for valor and the French Croix de Guerre with gilt star in recognition of his service in the Argonne Forest and between the Marne and Vesle Rivers. A shrine dedicated to the 28th Infantry Division is located on the grounds of the Pennsylvania Military Museum in Boalsburg, Pennsylvania. The site was formerly Boal's estate.

== Later years and death ==
Boal died in Boalsburg on August 22, 1938. He was buried in a crypt at the Christopher Columbus Chapel in Boalsburg, Pennsylvania.

== Architectural works ==
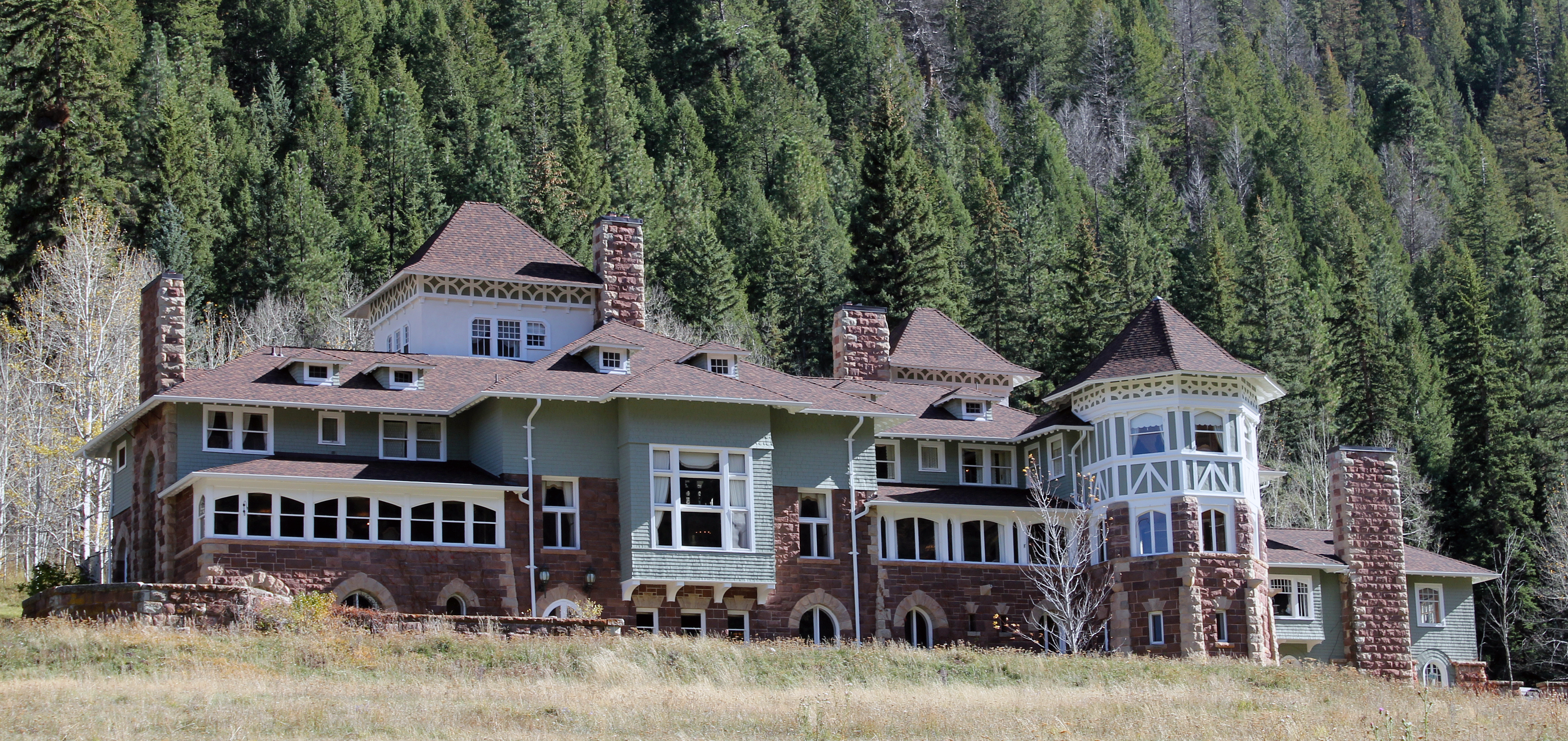
Redstone Castle (1903), also called Cleveholm or Osgood Castle, south of Redstone, National Register of Historic Places

Some of Boal's works are:

- Ferguson-Gano House (1897), Denver Local Landmark
- Boal Mansion (1898–1905), in Boalsburg, Pennsylvania, National Register of Historic Places
- Redstone Historic District (1900–1903), in Redstone, National Register of Historic Places
- Osgood Gamekeeper's Lodge (1901), near Redstone, National Register of Historic Places
- Osgood–Kuhnhausen House (1901), in Redstone, National Register of Historic Places
- Grant–Humphreys Mansion (1902), in Denver, National Register of Historic Places
- Redstone Castle (1903), also called Cleveholm or Osgood Castle, south of Redstone, National Register of Historic Places
- Crawford Hill Mansion (1906), in Denver, National Register of Historic Places
