= Boal and Harnois =

American architecture firm

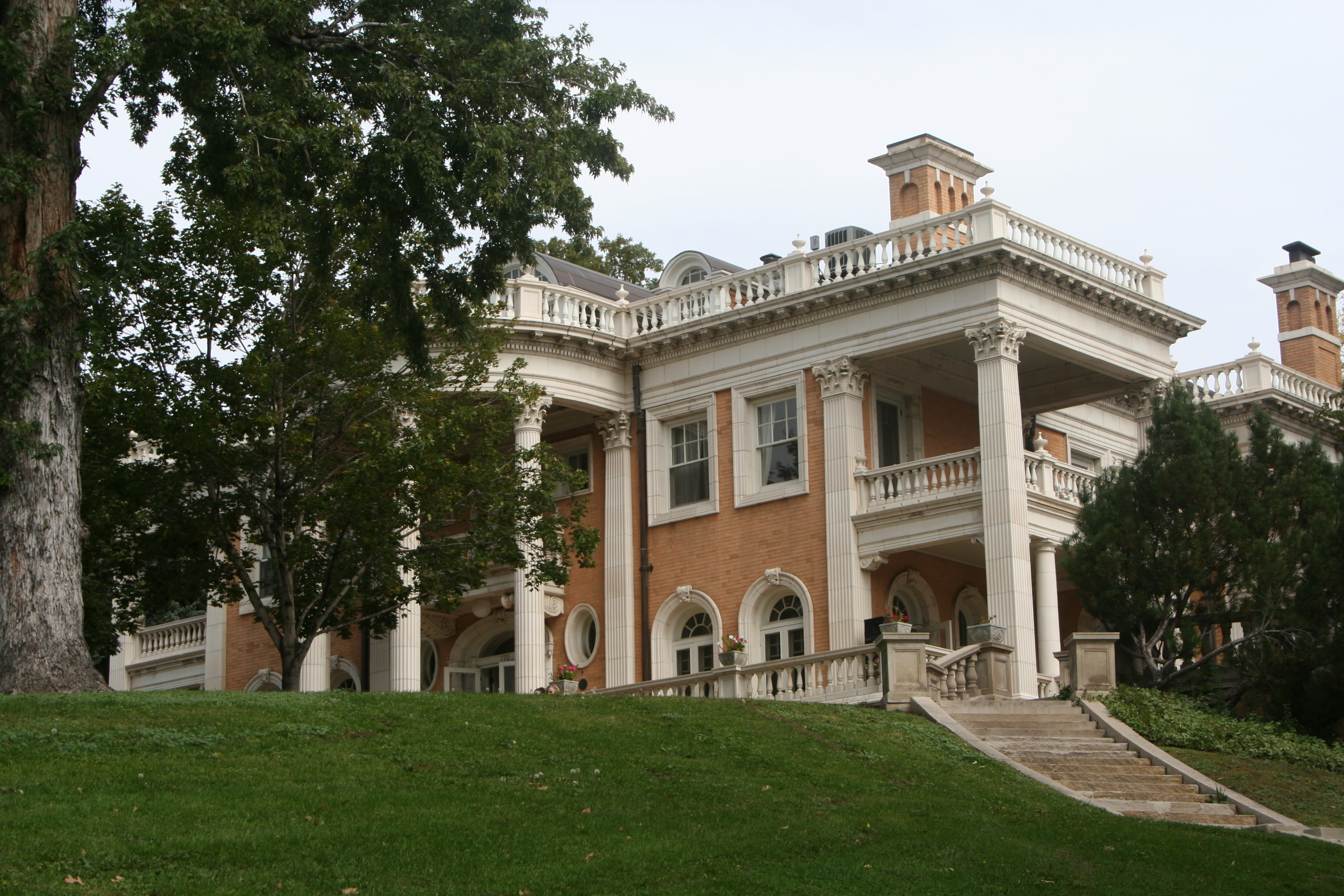
The Grant-Humphreys Mansion on Pennsylvania Street in Denver, Colorado

Boal and Harnois was an architectural firm active from 1901 until 1907 in Colorado. Theodore Davis Boal (1867-1938) and Frederick Louis Harnois (1872-1921) were its partners. The firm created the Ferguson-Gano House (1897), the Grant-Humphreys Mansion (1902), other buildings located in Denver, and Osgood Castle (1903) in Redstone.
