= Boal Mansion =

Historic house in Pennsylvania, United States

- U.S. National Register of Historic Places
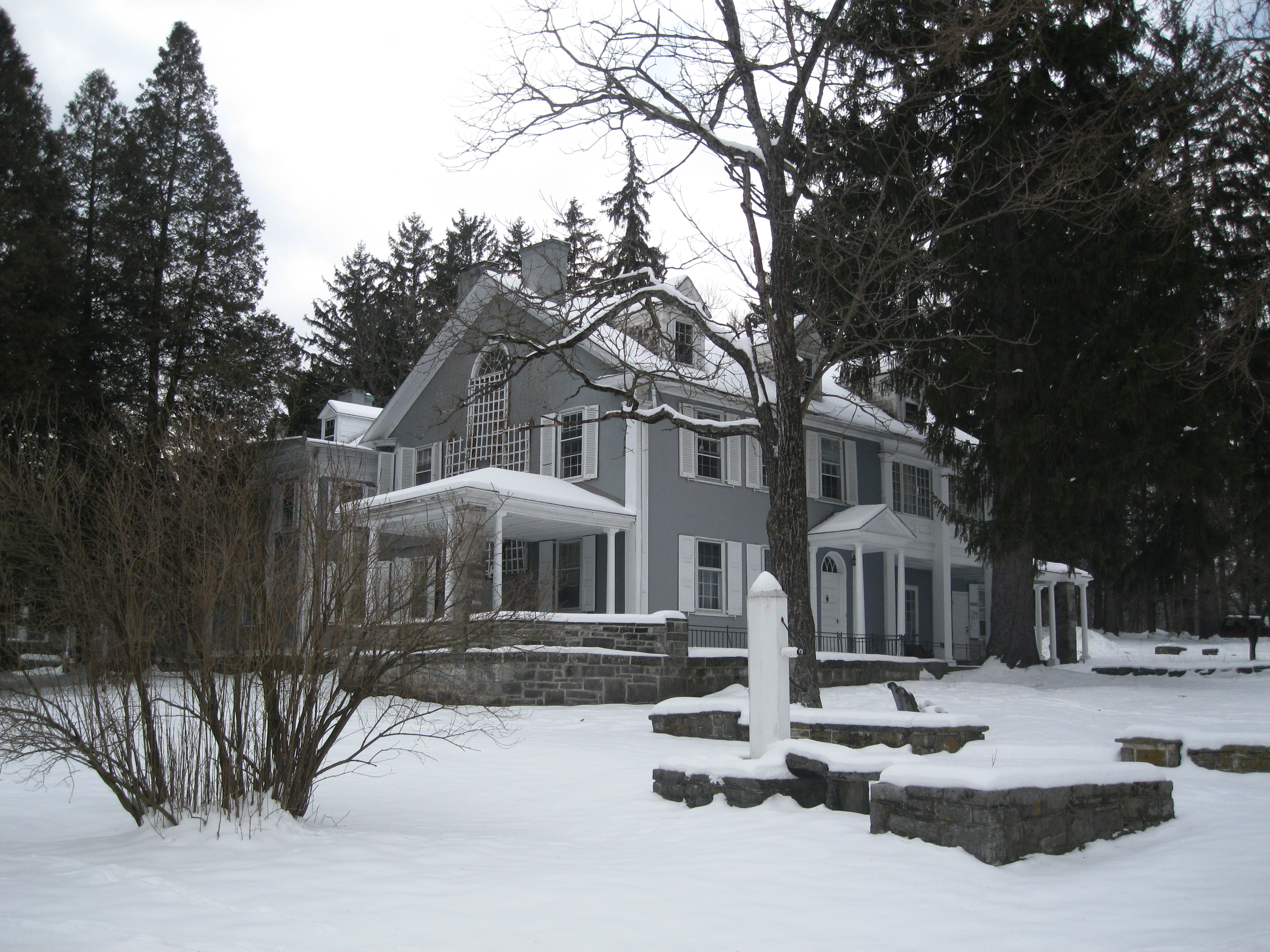
- The mansion in 2013

- Location within Pennsylvania Location within the United States
- Interactive map showing the location of Boal Mansion
- Location: U.S. Route 322 and Pennsylvania Route 45 in Boalsburg, Harris Township, Pennsylvania
- Coordinates: 40°46′44″N 77°48′1″W
- Area: 38 acres (15 ha)
- Built: 1809-1820
- Built by: David Boal; Theodore Davis Boal
- Architectural style: Beaux Arts, Georgian
- Restored: 1952
- NRHP reference No.: 78002361

Significant dates
- Expanded: 1898-1905
- Designated NRHP: December 4, 1978

Boal Mansion is a historic home located at Boalsburg, Harris Township, Centre County, Pennsylvania. The original pioneer cabin was built in 1809 and was a simple 1 1/2-story stone house. It was incorporated as the kitchen and kitchen hall when the house was expanded. The expansion is a two-story stone house in the Georgian style which measures 30 by 50 feet (9.1 by 15.2 m) and has a side hall plan. The house was expanded again between 1898 and 1905 by Theodore Davis Boal and introduced some Beaux-Arts style design. The main façade was expanded from three to five bays.

The collection on display includes the admiral's desk of Christopher Columbus, a lock of hair of Napoleon, two pieces of the true cross of Jesus and the carriages, tools and weapons of eight generations of Boals. Also on the property is the 16th century Columbus Chapel, which was imported from Spain in 1909; an 1898 hipped-roof carriage house; a silo and Boal Barn, previously a summer theater; a stone smoke house; and two outdoor fireplaces. The house, open as a historic house museum, was added to the National Register of Historic Places in 1978.

== Nittany Theatre at the Barn ==
The Barn housed a theatre on the Boal Mansion property which was used as a playhouse during the summer months by the Nittany Theatre. There were usually around six plays or musicals each summer with professional and local actors and actresses, as well as smaller theater projects. Penn State playwrights have also had premieres, read-throughs and dress rehearsals at the Barn.

== Gallery ==
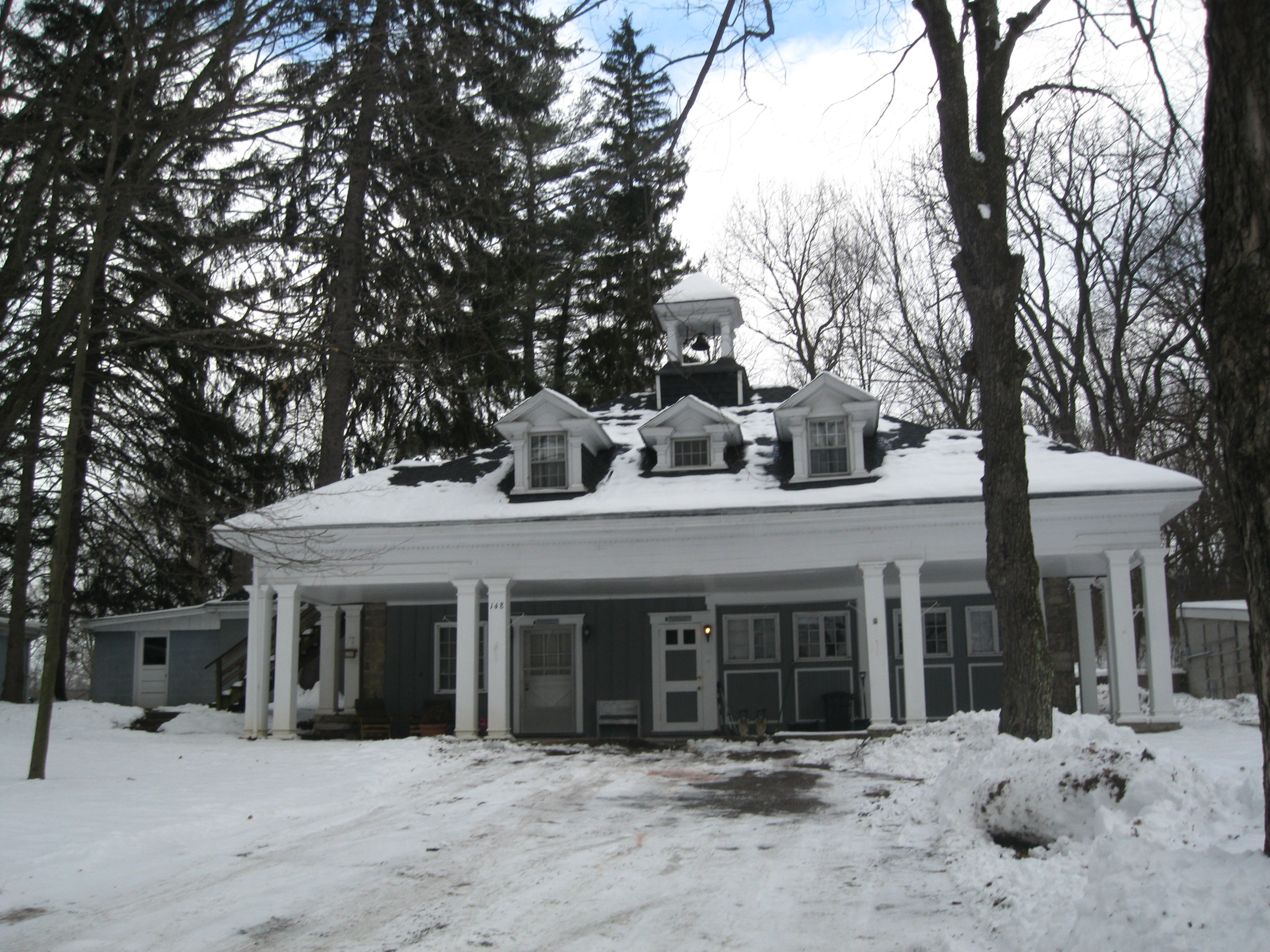
The 1898 carriage house

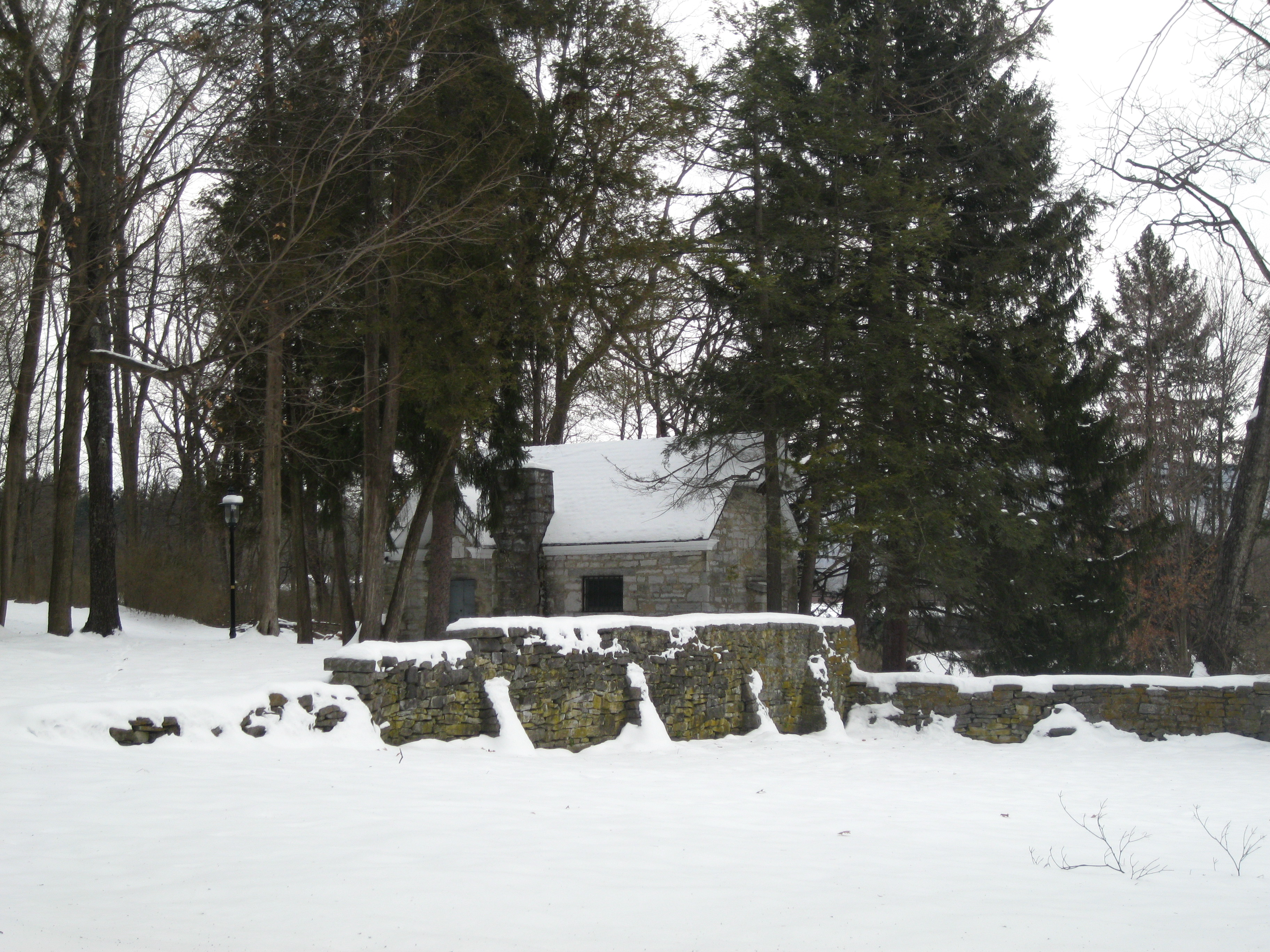
The 1909 Christopher Columbus chapel

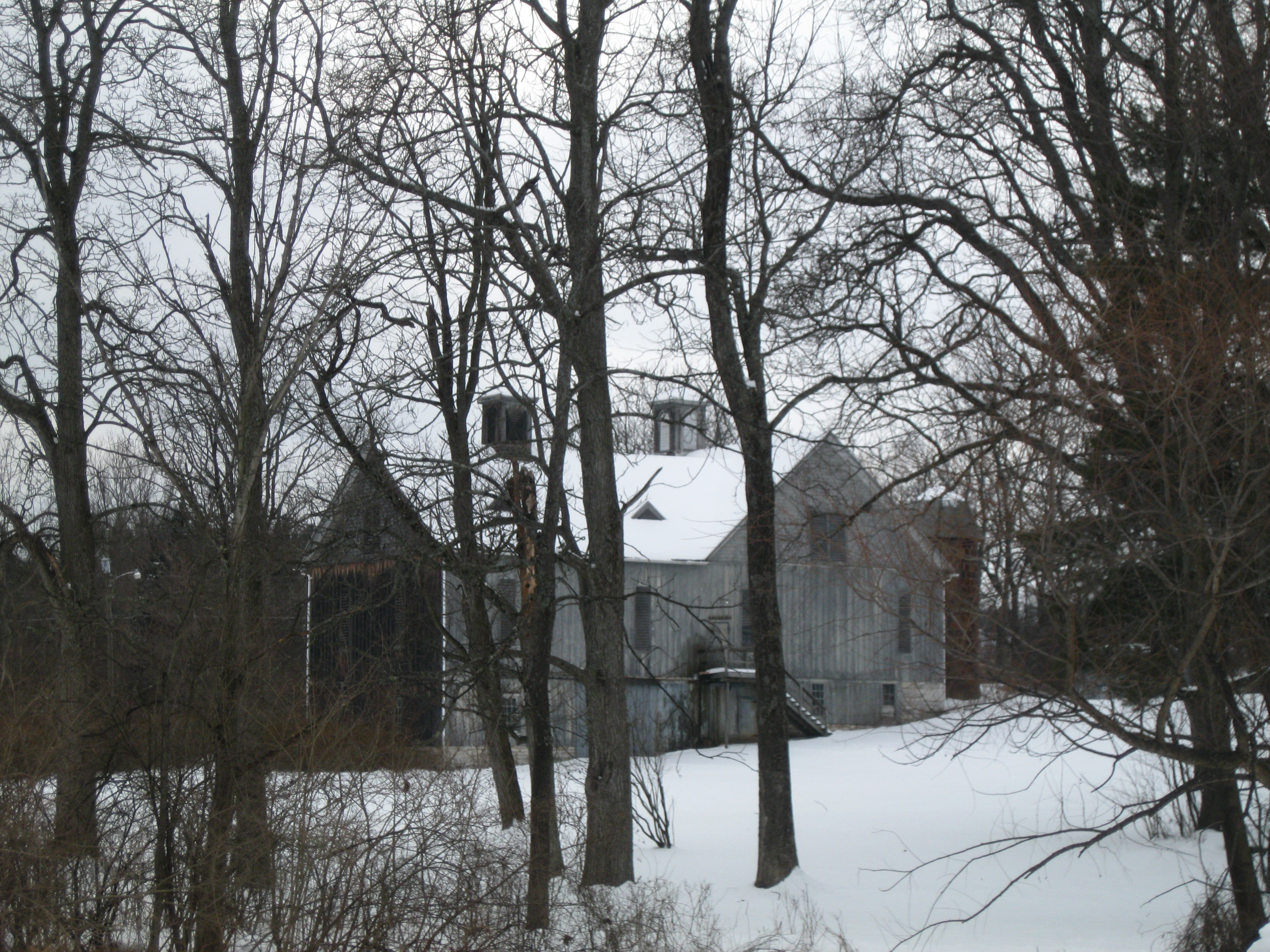
The barn
