= John C. Osgood =

American industrialist (1851–1926)

John Cleveland Osgood
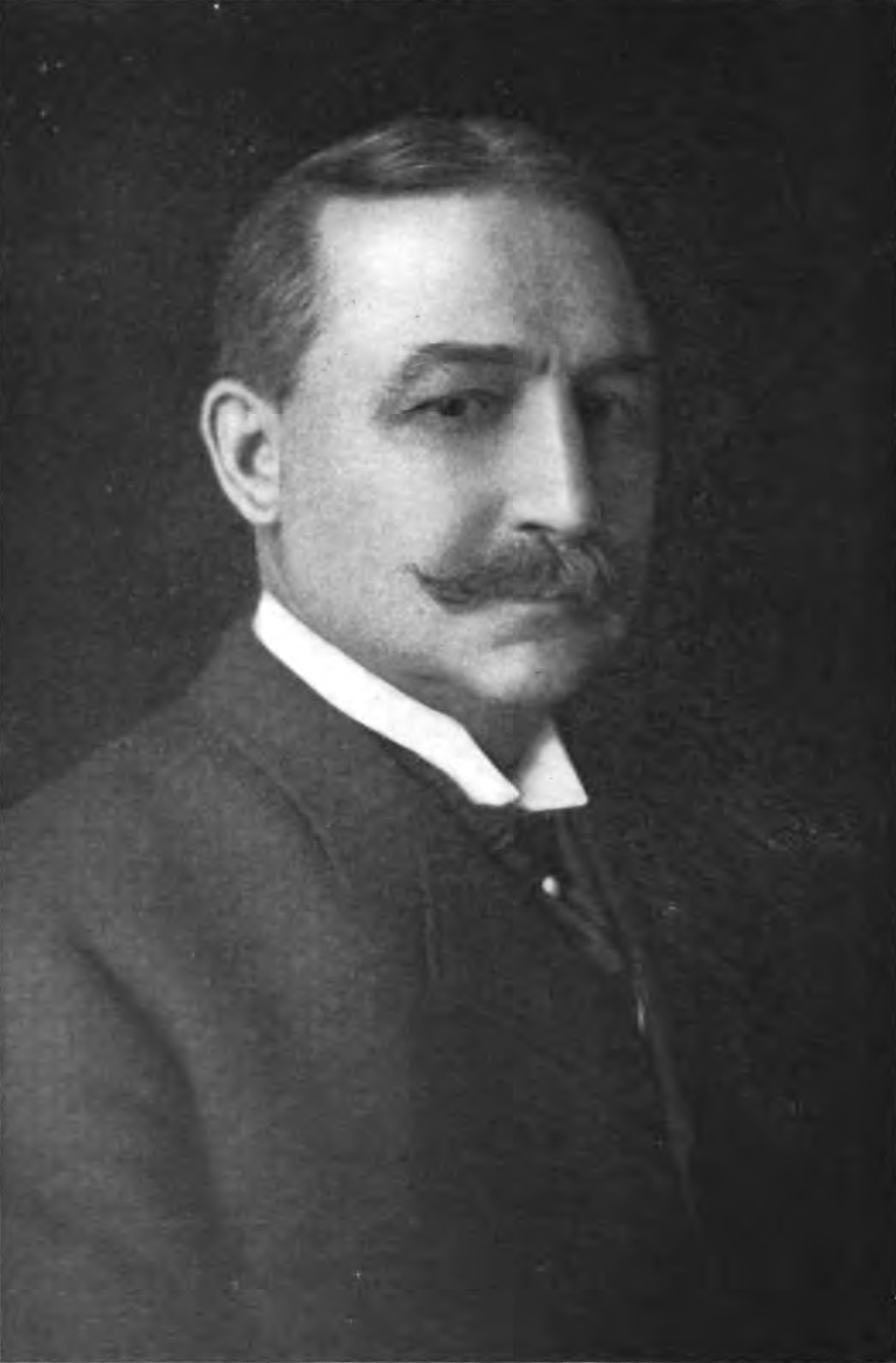
- Born: March 6, 1851; Brooklyn, New York, US
- Died: January 3, 1926 (aged 74); Redstone, Colorado, US
- Occupation: Industrialist
- Spouse: Nannie Irene Belote (m. 1887; div. 1899) Alma Regina Shelgren (m. 1899; div. 1920) Lucille Reid (m. 1908)

John Cleveland Osgood (March 6, 1851 – January 3, 1926) was an American industrialist who founded the Colorado Fuel and Iron Company and Victor-American Fuel Company. A self-made man, he has been called a robber baron. He also founded Redstone, Colorado.

== Biography ==
=== Early life ===
Osgood was born in Brooklyn, but moved with his father to Burlington, Iowa at age 6. He had a younger sister, Julia, and a brother, Charles. After his father died in 1859, he was sent to Providence, Rhode Island to live with family and attend school. At age 14, he was on his own, working in the office of a cotton mill where he gained business knowledge. He left for New York City at age 16 and clerked for a Produce Exchange Commission firm while attending night school. After three years there, he returned to southeast Iowa as cashier of the White Breast Fuel Company, then learned the banking business as cashier of the First National Bank of Burlington. At age 26, he took over the White Breast Fuel Company.

=== Colorado ===
In the winter of 1882, Osgood was sent to Colorado to research that state's coal resources for the Chicago, Burlington and Quincy Railroad. He visited every mine in the state and absorbed every detail. Colorado had been a state for fewer than six years, and few people besides John Osgood had the vision to see the possibilities of coal. He began to obtain huge tracts of coal land, and formed the Colorado Fuel Company in 1887. The business grew quickly, and five years later, they merged with the Colorado Coal and Iron Company to form the Colorado Fuel and Iron Company (CF&I), the largest in the state. The Bessemer iron works at Pueblo, Colorado became the headquarters of the new company.

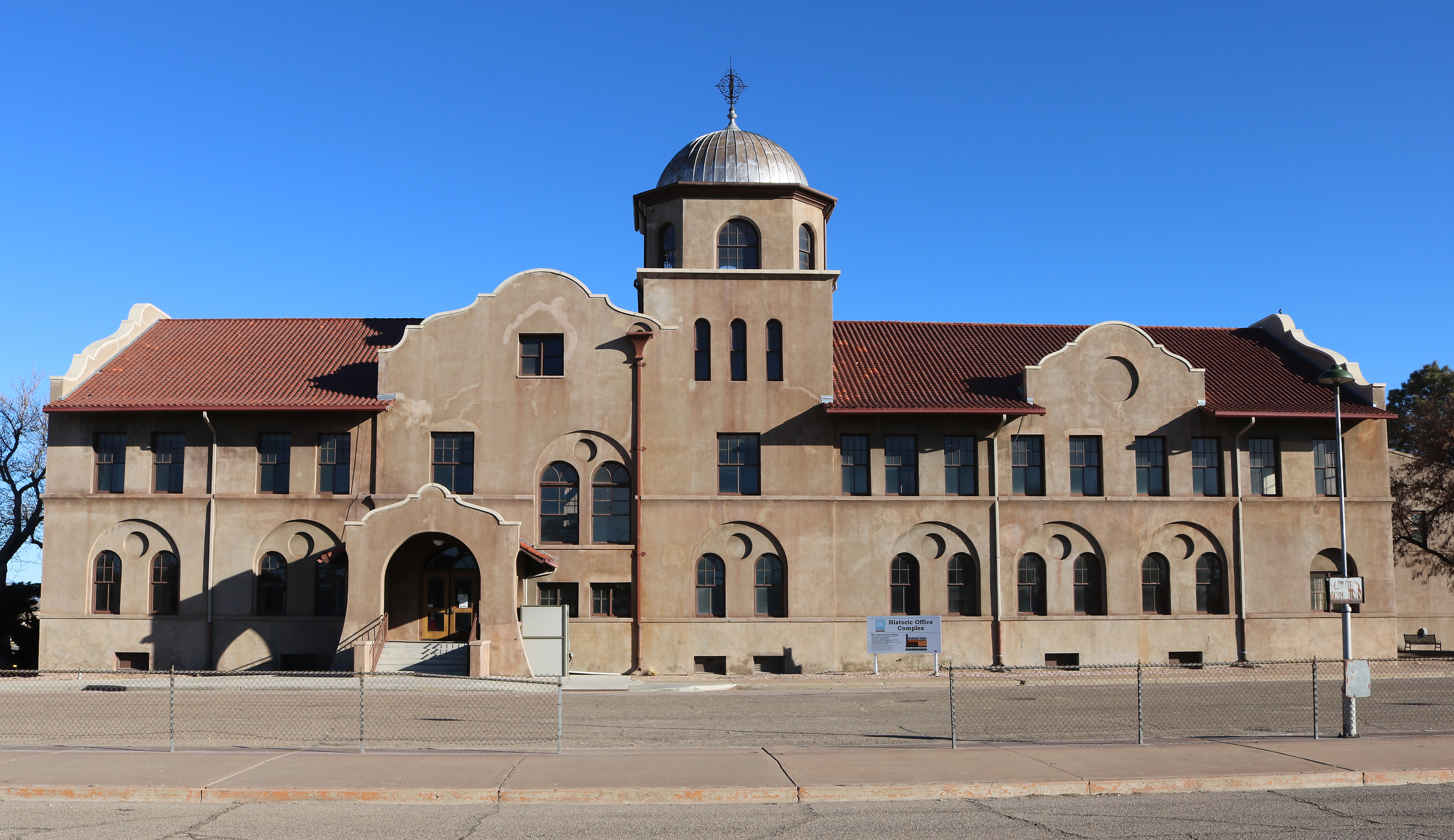
The 1901 Colorado Fuel and Iron Company office

Miner strikes in 1894 and 1901 were costly to CF&I, and they were mining three quarters of the state's coal in 1892. Osgood testified at a committee hearing of the Colorado General Assembly following the 1901 strike. He insisted that management knew what was best for the miners and labor unions were a threat to the United States.

Osgood decided to try welfare capitalism, which was becoming a popular program to eliminate the need for unions and improve the company image. In theory, contented workers are more productive and don't strike. The system provided for and controlled all the workers' needs. To address healthcare needs, CF&I built a modern hospital in Pueblo for use by their employees throughout the state.

=== Redstone ===
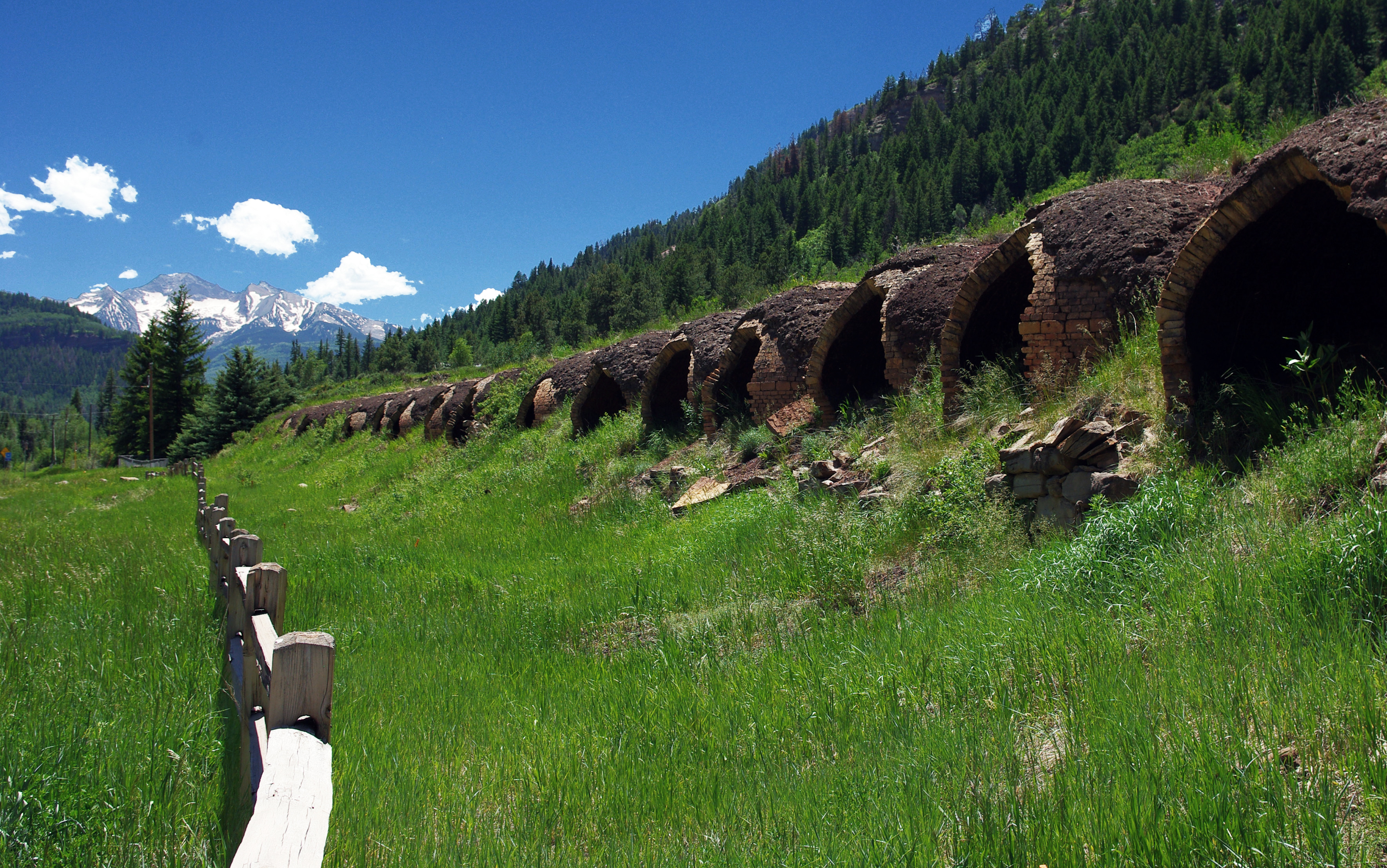
Old Coke ovens

Osgood established Redstone, Colorado in the late 19th century as a company town. 249 coke ovens were built to turn coal into coke. The Crystal River Railroad was constructed to facilitate transportation of the coal from the mines at Coalbasin just over four miles to the west, and the coke to the foundries in Pueblo.

Redstone became Osgood's experiment in welfare capitalism. Worker housing in mining towns was typically primitive; most were poorly built shacks. Osgood constructed 84 Craftsman-era Swiss chalet style cottages (for married workers) and a 40-room dormitory (for bachelors), all with indoor plumbing and electricity.

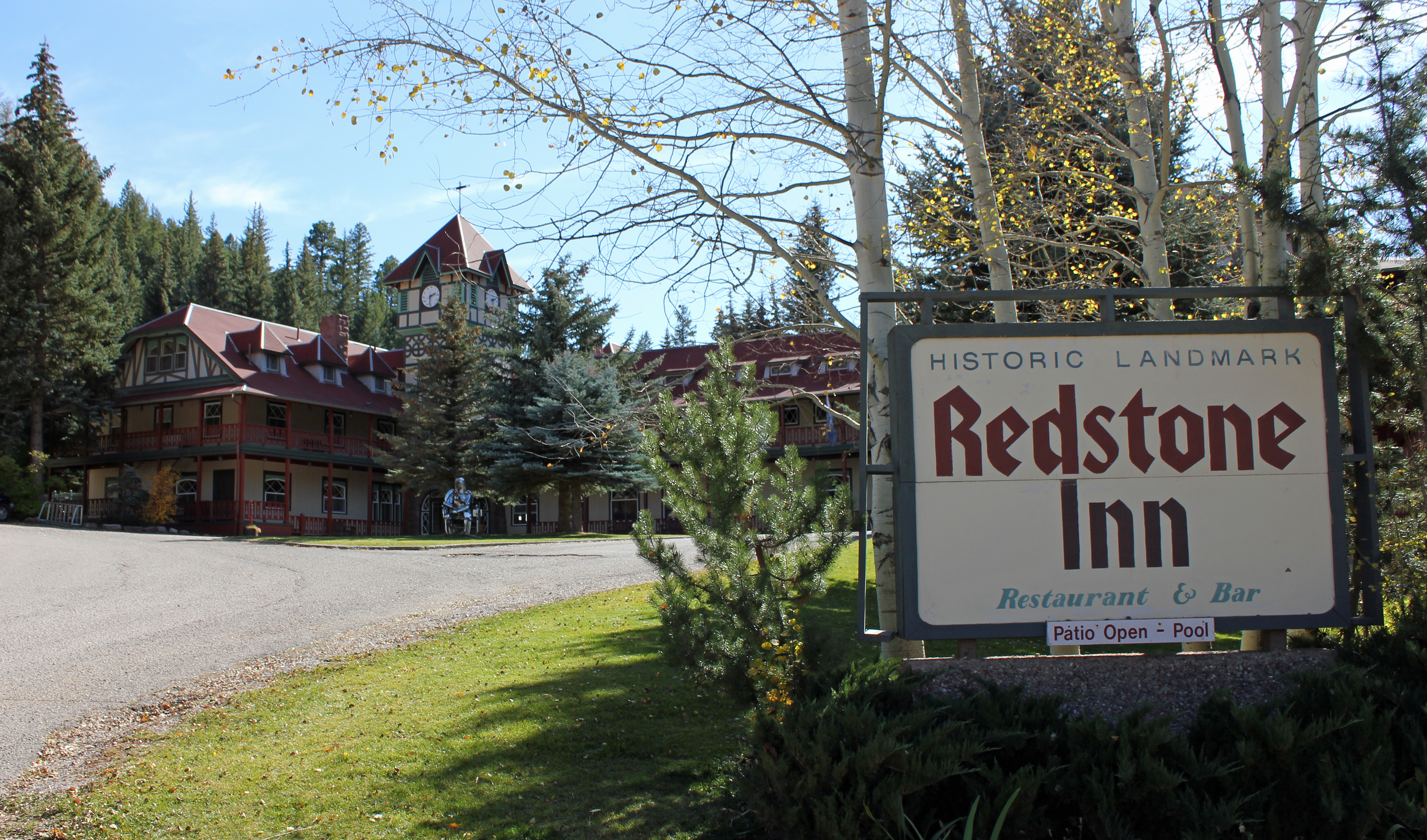
Bachelor's dormitory

A school was constructed to educate the children of workers, and the Redstone Club was completed in 1902 at a cost of $25,000 ($930,000 in modern dollars). It contained reading rooms stocked, according to a New York Times article, "with papers in different languages, the best of the weeklies and magazines". A library, a small theater, and a bathhouse were also part of the structure. The latter permitted workers to shower or bathe and change clothes after work.

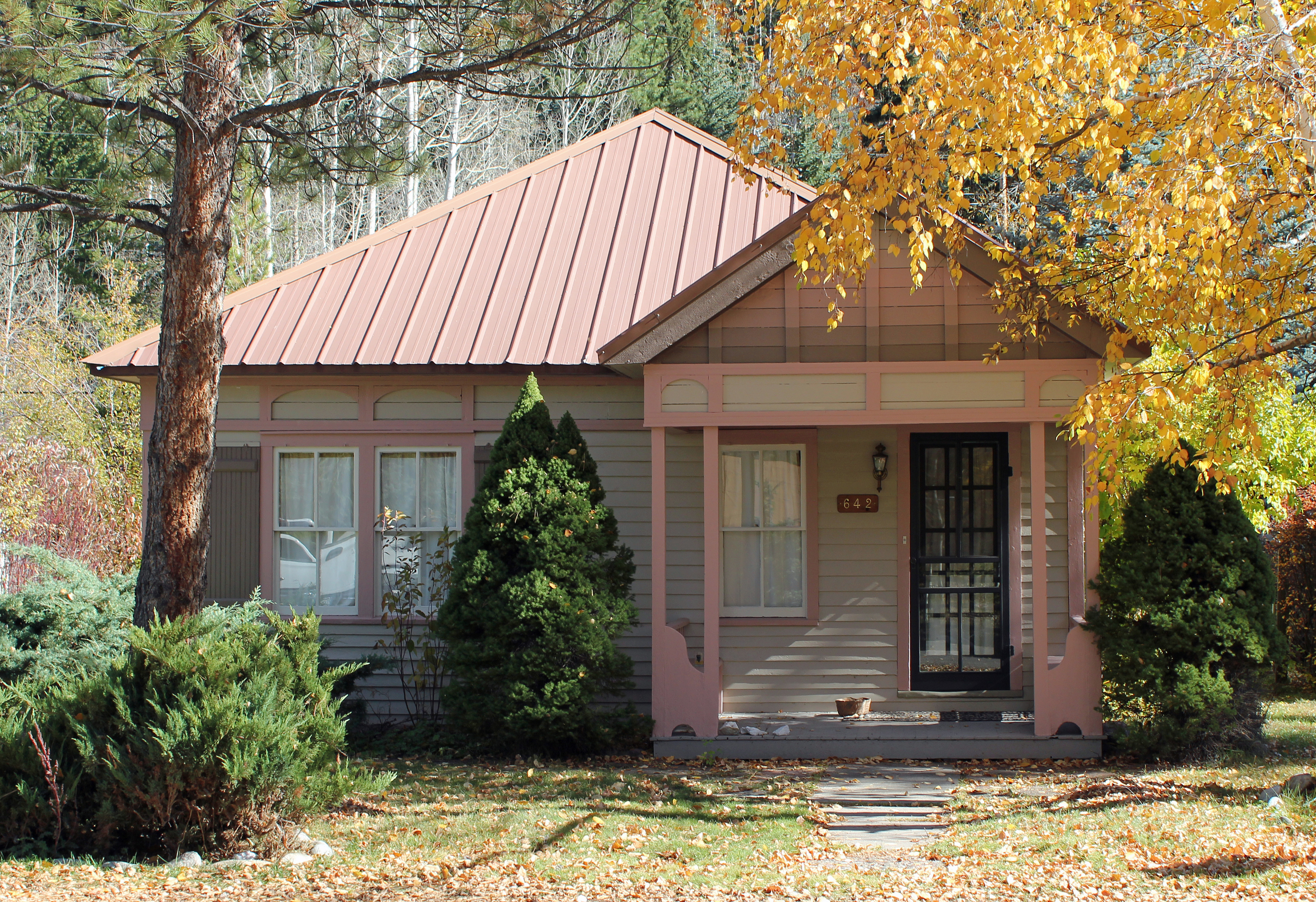
Swiss chalet style cottage

A saloon was also part of the Club, with card tables and pool tables, but specific rules were strictly enforced. To avoid drunkenness, the "No treating" rule prohibited buying rounds of drinks. The only gambling allowed was penny ante poker and dime wagers on pocket billiards.

Other community facilities included an irrigated garden with a couple of acres available to each employee to grow vegetables, a public barn for worker's livestock, and a wash house for laundering clothes and linens.

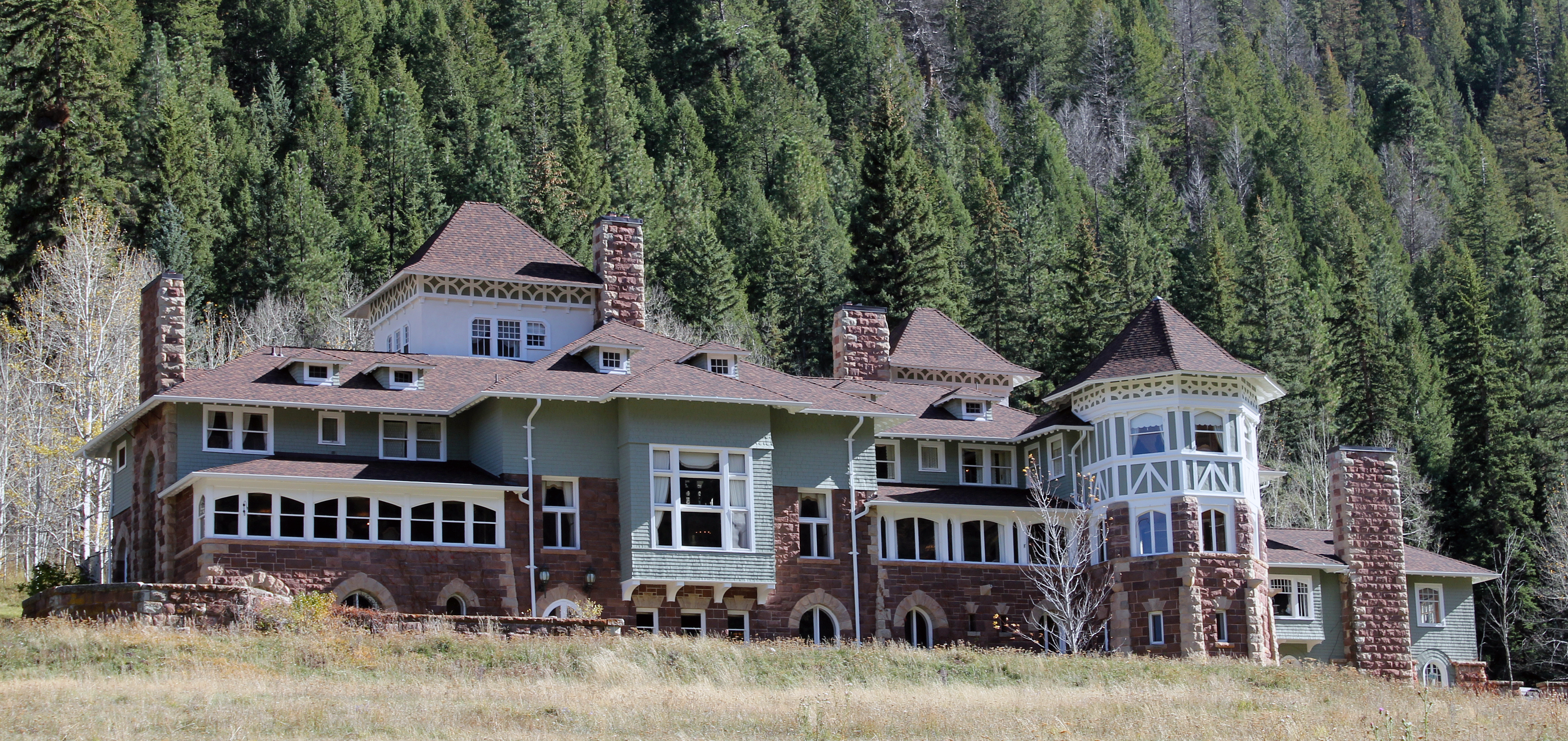
Cleveholm Manor, aka Osgood Castle

=== Castle ===
A dominant feature one mile from Redstone is Cleveholm Manor, commonly called "Redstone Castle" or "Osgood Castle", an opulent 42-room Tudor-style mansion that Osgood built for his second wife, Swedish Countess Alma Regina Shelgrem. Construction of the 24,000 ft^{2} residence, which was designed by New York architects Boal and Harnois, began in 1897 and was completed in 1901 at a cost of $50,000 ($1.86 million in modern dollars).

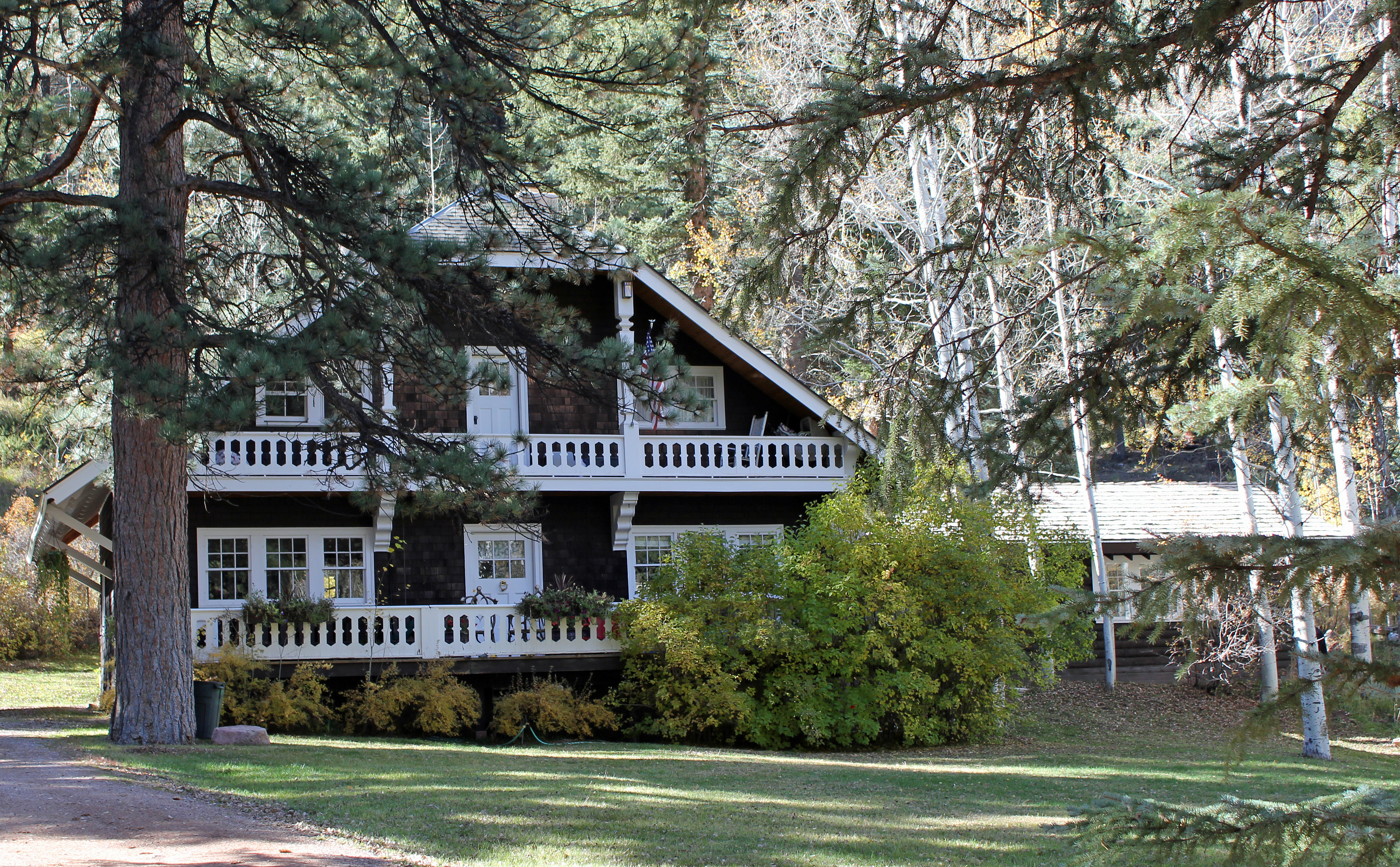
Gamekeeper's Lodge

The Castle was part of a 72-acre (29 ha) estate that also included servants' quarters, a gamekeeper's lodge, a carriage house, and a greenhouse. Two gatekeeper's lodges were built, one each on the north and south boundaries. There was a kennel for the dogs, and the stable could shelter 25 horses, as well as cattle, hogs, and chickens. The adjacent game preserve had abundant deer, elk and bighorn sheep; a stocked pond was available for fishing.

=== Stock fight ===
A collier strike at other Colorado mines left CF&I financially weakened, and Osgood successfully defended a takeover bid by John W. Gates of Chicago. However, billionaire John D. Rockefeller and heirs of Jay Gould eventually won a stock war in 1903.

Osgood had lost control of CF&I, but he still owned the town of Redstone and Cleveholm. The new CF&I management was unsupportive of social programs, and Osgood was forced to abandon his experiment, devoting no time to the endeavor, and no subsequent social programs were ever attempted. To combat unionization, he used violence to intimidate union organizers and members, imported unskilled immigrants, hired ethnic or racial groups that disliked each other, became influential in local and state governments, and colluded with other mine operators.

After he started the Victor-American Fuel Company, his stays at Cleveholm became infrequent. His principal residence became New York City, but he traveled frequently, spending time at Palm Beach and cruising to Europe. Cleveholm was boarded up in 1913.

=== Strike ===
There was a general mine strike throughout Colorado from 1913 to 1914. By this time, John D. Rockefeller Jr. controlled CF&I, but for the most part, he was an absentee owner.

The three largest mining companies involved, Colorado Fuel and Iron, Victor American, and Rocky Mountain Fuel, had a joint committee for establishing policy concerning the strike, but Osgood was the dominant voice. Osgood organized a publicity campaign to discredit the workers and union. He pressured Colorado Governor Elias M. Ammons to deploy the National Guard to the mines. Following the strike, he used his influence to persuade the judiciary to prosecute strikers. The reforms proposed by Rockefeller were delayed at Osgood's insistence. Rockefeller speculated that Osgood was trying to embarrass Rockefeller into selling his ownership of CF&I back to Osgood.

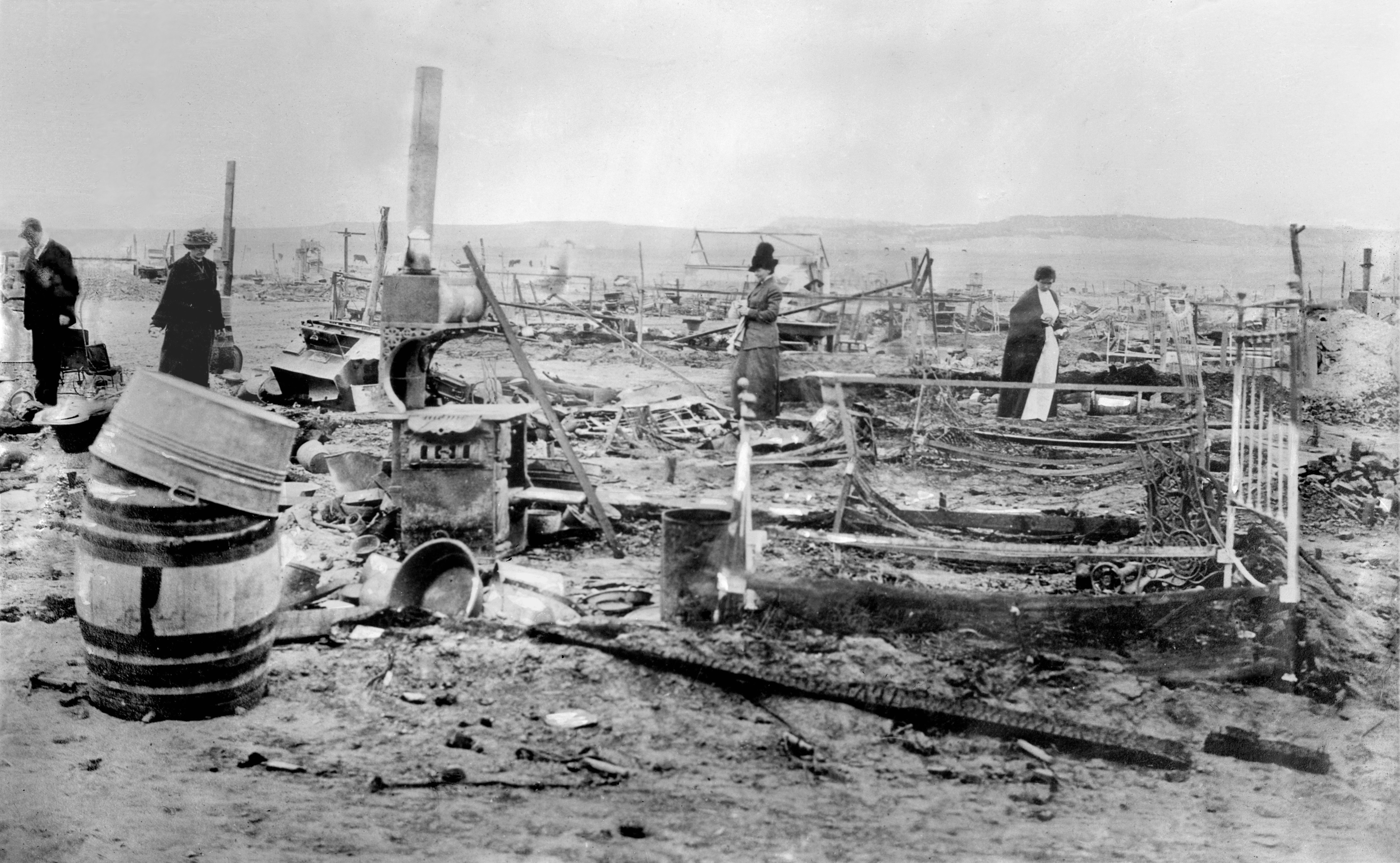
Burned tent city, where women and children died

The mine operators steadfastly refused to negotiate with the union or agree to government arbitration. Over the course of a year, frustration and anger on both sides grew and led to the Ludlow Massacre in 1914.

The Hastings Mine disaster occurred in 1917, killing 121.

=== Personal life, death, and legacy ===
Osgood married three times, but had no children. In June 1887, he married his first wife Nannie Irene Belote, better known as novelist Irene Osgood, in New York. They divorced in July 1899. Three months later, Osgood married his second wife, Alma Regina Shelgren. They divorced in 1920, and he married his third wife, Lucille Reid, the same year.

After touring Europe, he and Lucille returned to Redstone in 1925 when he was diagnosed with terminal cancer. Osgood died at Cleveholm in 1926 and his ashes were scattered throughout the Crystal River valley. Lucille tried to transform the estate into a resort, but the worldwide depression of 1929 doomed that plan.

Cleveholm Manor and the gamekeeper's cottage are both independently listed on the National Register as Osgood Castle and Osgood Gamekeeper's Lodge, respectively. As of 2004, the Castle still contained 75 percent of its original furnishings. The historic dormitory in Redstone, which is independently listed on the National Register as Redstone Inn, is now operated as a resort inn, offering year-round accommodations. Many of the cottages are still used as homes. The Redstone Coke Oven Historic District was established, and several dozen ovens will be stabilized, with a few completely restored.
