= Redstone Castle =

Historic house in Colorado, United States

- Osgood Castle
- U.S. National Register of Historic Places
- U.S. Historic district – Contributing property
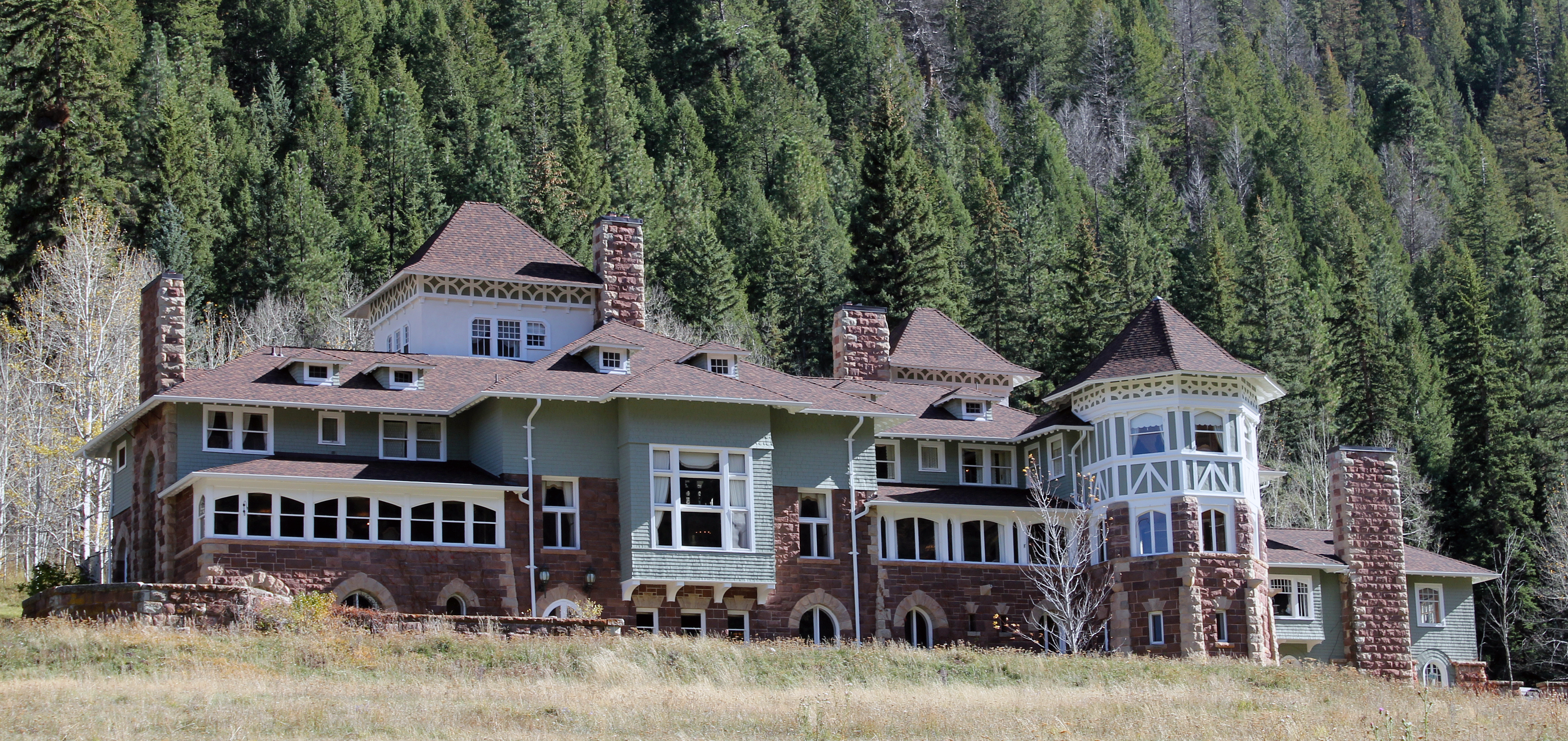
- West (front) elevation, 2011

- Location within Colorado
- Location: Redstone, CO
- Nearest city: Aspen
- Coordinates: 39°10′9″N 107°14′29″W
- Area: 150 acres (61 ha)
- Built: 1903
- Architect: Theodore Boal
- Architectural style: Stick style
- Part of: Redstone Historic District (ID89000934)
- NRHP reference No.: 71000216
- Added to NRHP: June 28, 1971

Redstone Castle, also known as Cleveholm or Osgood Castle, is a mansion south of Redstone, Colorado, United States. It is a large timber frame structure built in the early 20th century as the home of John C. Osgood, founder of the Colorado Fuel and Iron Company, in a simplified version of the Stick style. In 1971 it was added to the National Register of Historic Places, the first property in Pitkin County to be listed. It was later additionally listed as a contributing property to the Redstone Historic District.

The castle was at the south end of the planned company town of Redstone, meant by Osgood to be an improvement over the usual housing and conditions in Western mining towns of the late 19th century. Just across the Crystal River were the coke ovens that processed coal mined higher up in the mountains and loaded onto a rail line. Miners and cokers in the town lived in cottages with electricity and running water, considered luxury items at the time. At his mansion, Osgood, at the time one of the country's richest men, entertained guests like Theodore Roosevelt, John D. Rockefeller and King Leopold of Belgium, who joined him on hunts. The lush interior features European antique furniture and work by Gustav Stickley and Louis Comfort Tiffany. Its design was supposedly based on the ancestral home of Osgood's wife Alma.

Redstone's prosperity ended within a decade, after Osgood lost control of the company, and he spent less time there. He returned to the property in the late 1920s to die. His wife tried to convert the house into a resort, but the Great Depression made that economically unviable; however, later owners were able to run it as a hotel into the 1990s.

A recent owner who tried to refurbish was indicted in a financial fraud scheme, and the Internal Revenue Service sold it to compensate victims in its first-ever online auction of seized real property. It was sold again in 2016, and after a renovation, owners Steve and April Carver opened a ten-room boutique hotel in the castle in November 2018. It is also open for daily public tours. The 2006 film The Prestige used the castle as a location.

== Buildings and grounds ==
The mansion and its surviving outbuildings are located on 150 acres (61 ha) approximately one mile (1.6 km) south of Redstone at the south end of Redstone Boulevard, which makes a loop to form the house's main driveway. It is located on high ground overlooking the Crystal River and State Highway 133 to the west, at an elevation of almost 7,400 feet (2,300 m) above sea level. On either side of the narrow valley are steep, undeveloped mountain slopes towards summits above 12,000 feet (3,700 m). They rise into White River National Forest, with the eastern slopes part of the Maroon Bells–Snowmass Wilderness between Redstone and Aspen.

=== Exterior ===
The main house sits at the east end of a cleared area that slopes up from the river, its west elevation visible from Highway 133. A walled terrace is attached to the southeast corner, and a cobbled courtyard on the east. The carriage path crossing it leads to the main entrance arch.

It is an irregularly shaped three-story structure on a foundation of locally quarried rough-cut sandstone, irregularly exposed due to the slope, that also serves as the facade material for most of the first story. Lighter-toned stone serves as trim on some of the arched windows, keystones and quoins.

Above the stone the house is faced in either wood shingles or stucco. Most windows are one-over-one double-hung sash windows. Those set in shingled faces are simply treated, while those in stone are trimmed in contrasting stone with radiating voussoirs.

On the south and west facades are oriel windows supported by brackets. There are some decorative half-timbered friezes. The sections have variously peaked or hipped shingled roofs, pierced by occasional hip-roofed dormers and four tall stone chimneys. At the southwest corner is a three-story octagonal tower with a conical roof and stone buttresses, complemented by two peaked-roof towers on the eastern (rear) elevation.

=== Interior ===
Inside, the house's 24,000 square feet (2,200 m^{2}) are divided among 42 rooms. The first floor is dominated by the English-style Great Hall, with 18-foot (5.5 m) ceilings and a large sandstone fireplace carved with Osgood's lion-based coat of arms and topped by a trophy elk mount. Three large brass globes designed by Louis Comfort Tiffany, themselves decorated with lions, pineapples and angels, light the room. A special "peeping window" in the ceiling allowed Alma Osgood to see how female visitors were dressed so that she could adjust her own attire before receiving them.

Persian carpets cover the floors in the hall and other first-floor rooms. Much of the furniture is antiques brought over from Europe by the Osgoods. The wooden paneling on the walls, made of English oak and Honduran mahogany, was designed by Gustav Stickley. The dining room reflects Russian tsarist tastes, with its hand-rubbed mahogany stained cherry red and covered with ruby velvet. The ceilings are finished in gold leaf.

The library, overlooking the front lawn, has a Persian theme, evoking the private railcars tycoons like Osgood traveled in. Its walls and shelves are of mahogany, topped with green leather stamped in gold leaf. On the ceiling is a gold leaf border, hand-stenciled in a peacock motif. A French-styled music parlor, meant as the ladies' drawing room, has green silk damask walls, frescoed plaster ceiling and a Carrara marble fireplace topped with a diamond dust mirror. The corresponding gentleman's game room down in the basement has its original billiards and card tables.

Upstairs are the bedrooms for the Osgoods and their guests. All feature bathrooms with oversized claw-foot porcelain bathtubs and sinks. Each has a fireplace of Italian marble or colored tile paneling. In the south tower is a two-room suite whose domed ceiling has been painted with birds and flowers.

=== Outbuildings ===
Several of the original outbuildings remain. The northern of the two gatehouses is located on Redstone Boulevard. It is architecturally similar to the main house, with a rusticated stone foundation and shingled siding. At the roofline's overhanging eaves are decorative vergeboards. The gabled roof is pierced by similarly gabled dormers.

Closer to the house is a stable and carriage house. It, too, is similar to the main house, with a randomly laid stone foundation, shingled walls, towers and gabled dormers. Inside it has oak walls and a special glass case for the harnesses. It has been converted into a house. To the west, near the river, is a small open pagoda used for concerts in the summertime.

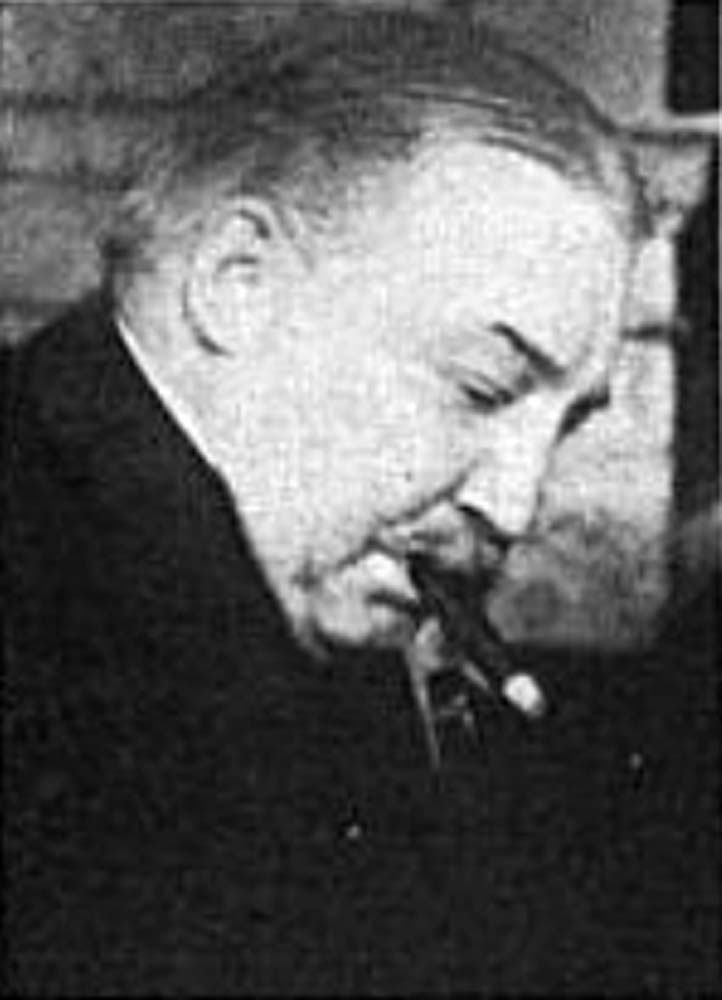
John C. Osgood

== History ==
The history of the castle has three periods: Osgood's early trips to the Crystal Valley and plans for the estate, the realization of that dream, and the years since his death in which it has been used as a hotel.

=== 1882–1899: Osgood comes to the Crystal Valley ===
A native of Brooklyn, New York, John C. Osgood first came to Colorado in 1882 to survey the state's coal resources for the Chicago, Burlington and Quincy Railroad. The next year, he formed the Colorado Fuel Company to supply the railroads with coal mined elsewhere. He intended to go into the mining business himself, and had his eye on the lands of the remote Crystal Valley, recently opened up to European settlement through a treaty with the Ute people, the Native American tribe that had long lived in the area.

During his surveys, Osgood had found that the valley's coal was of particularly high quality, low in ash and with few impurities. Coal that pure could not only be used as it was, it could be made into coke, useful in the production of steel. He began buying land in the valley, eventually owning thousands of acres. Most of it he eventually sold to his company, but he held onto a desirable portion for the hunting lodge he planned to build, with its surrounding game preserves.

For both the estate and the mining to happen, the valley had to be made accessible. Various schemes to build toll roads and railroads were launched over the next ten years, and some construction was undertaken, but not enough financing was available to complete them. In 1892 Osgood's company merged with its rival, the Colorado Coal and Iron Company, to form Colorado Fuel and Iron (CFI), the largest such concern in the West. The combined firm had the assets to borrow against, but in the wake of the Panic of 1893 and its effect in Colorado, where many mining towns including nearby Aspen went into precipitous decline when the federal government stopped buying their silver, it was difficult to find banks willing to lend enough to pay for the railroad extension down the valley.

=== 1899–1925: Estate years ===
By 1899 the economy had improved. Osgood and CFI were able to build first the coke ovens, and then the company town of Redstone. Architect Theodore Boal designed small wooden cottages for the coke oven workers with running water and electricity, then luxury items rare in most Colorado mining towns. He adapted various contemporary architectural styles, particularly the Swiss chalet style, to the mountain setting.

For himself, Osgood had reserved and fenced off 4,200 acres (17 km^{2}), to which access was controlled by two gates. He had Boal design the mansion, which like the Redstone Inn to the north, then a dormitory for unmarried mine workers, used elements of the Tudor Revival style in addition to the Swiss Chalet forms. Originally it was intended to be a hunting lodge, as both Osgood and his Swedish-born wife, Alma, were avid outdoor sportspeople. It was completed in 1903 at a cost of $2.5 million ($89.6 million in modern dollars).

Additional outbuildings no longer extant include the southern gatehouse, similar to its northern counterpart with a rusticated foundation of local sandstone, Tudor arches, overhanging eaves, gabled dormer windows and half-timber detailing. Next to it the large wrought iron gates were in a large stone arch with Osgood's crest carved into the center and a bell.

Glaziers from New Jersey, then the center of the industry, were brought in to build a greenhouse, also no longer in existence. It consisted of an octagonal central pavilion and four radiating wings. Its southern entry used the same Tudor styling as the other buildings on the estate, with a half-timbered gabled entrance, decorative vergeboards and slanted lintels. It grew fresh flowers year-round, offsetting the valley's naturally short growing season.

A stone reservoir held water both for the extensive lawns and fire suppression. It was complemented with a hose house storing the linen and rubber hoses needed for both purposes. Neither are extant.

The stable was originally designed with both automobiles and horses in mind, reflecting the time of its construction. It also included a kennel for Osgood's hunting dogs. Horses were kept in a style almost as high as their owners, with paneled walls in their stalls and glass cases for their harnesses.

John and Alma Osgood lived in the house at nearby Crystal River ranch while they waited for the house to be complete. They entertained many prominent guests there. J.P. Morgan, Theodore Roosevelt, John D. Rockefeller and King Leopold II of Belgium came to enjoy the hunting on the private preserves, where elk and other game were abundant and rare bighorn sheep roamed (one of the stories told about the history of the house holds that Roosevelt took pleasure in shooting for game while standing on the mansion's front porch.) An extensive network of foot and bridle paths linked them with the house. After returning to the main house, guests shared dinner with their hosts, served on fine china with silver service, in the dining room. Following the meal, the women would retire to the music room with Alma while male guests would go downstairs to the game room and smoke cigars. A faint scent of cigar smoke can still be detected in the room.

These parties became less common after 1903. Interests controlled by Rockefeller's family gained control of CFI. Osgood started the Victor American Fuel Company, which became CFI's chief competitor, but spent less time in the Crystal Valley and more in New York. In 1909 changes in the economy made the shipment of Crystal Valley coke unprofitable despite its quality, and the town and coke ovens were shut down. Almost overnight, Redstone was nearly abandoned.

Osgood closed down the estate in 1913, leaving it to the care of the dozen or so who had remained in Redstone. After serving as a spokesperson for the mining companies during the labor disputes the following year which culminated in the Ludlow massacre, he did not return to the Crystal Valley until 1925. Suffering from terminal cancer, he worked to the extent he could with his third wife, Lucille, to redevelop the property, including what remained of the town, as a resort.

=== 1926–present: Resort years ===
In January 1926 Osgood died. His ashes were scattered over the valley. Lucille continued with the resort plans, but the onset of the Great Depression made that unworkable as too few people had the money to spare on trips to such a remote location. To make ends meet, she sold some of the major public buildings in the town, long out of use, and some of the estate's buildings like the southern gatehouse, for scrap. Some of these structures were moved—a part of the greenhouse still stands in Glenwood Springs. Finally, in the 1940s, she sold the house itself.

The coal mines were reopened by another company in the early 1950s. This revival gave the mansion's new owner, Frank Kistler, who also owned the Hotel Colorado in Glenwood Springs, the impetus to tap into the house's potential as an all-season resort. He added a new wing to the building, and on the grounds built additional recreational facilities such as an enclosed swimming pool and tennis courts. The front lawn was converted into a golf course. The northern gatehouse was converted into a ski lodge after a ski lift was built.

While some of the remaining cottages and estate outbuildings did become second homes, the resort plans were not successful as the four ski areas at nearby Aspen were attracting all the skiers and contributing to that city's renaissance in the second half of the 20th century. Kistler's death in 1960 also stalled the plans. In 1974 the mansion was purchased by Kenneth E Johnson a newspaper publisher from Grand Junction Colorado. He oversaw a major restoration of the buildings and for a time kept it as a family home. During this time tours of the building were open to the public. The mansion was later opened as a Bed and Breakfast and for special events such as weddings and conferences. In 1997 Johnson sold the property to a Canadian company. They soon defaulted on the mortgage for the property, and it was foreclosed and sold at auction. Leon Harte, one of the new owners, said he hoped to make it a "party palace" with rock concerts on the front lawn.

In 2003 the Internal Revenue Service (IRS) seized it. Harte died two months later and the IRS announced that it would hold an online auction of the castle in March 2005, the first time it had ever disposed of a seized piece of real property that way. Bidders were required to put down a $100,000 deposit.

By the early 21st century Redstone's population had grown to about 120, counting the remaining village and its environs. They were worried that a developer would buy it and demolish the castle, which they considered an important part of the community's history, to build expensive homes for the Aspen-area market. They were not opposed to doing that on some of the property, but a few years earlier, one developer had proposed a 1,500-unit condominium on the site and the castle's demolition. The IRS allayed their concerns by putting in easements to protect about 13 acres (5.3 ha) around the castle and carriage house.

Interest in the auction was high. The page advertising the property received over 50,000 hits in the weeks leading up to it. Interest in bidding came from overseas as well as domestically. The winning bidder, Ralli Dimitrius, a developer who divided his time between Aspen and Southern California, paid $4 million. He did not disclose his identity as the buyer for almost a week. A dejected fellow bidder who felt the IRS had not given prospective buyers enough time to do due diligence offered him an additional million to sell it to her, but he refused.

Dimitrius planned to do extensive restoration on the property. In 2007, he reopened it for tours, bringing much-desired tourist traffic to Redstone. Four years later, the tours had proven so successful that they were expanded to every day rather than just weekends. In the meantime, Dimitrius restored the plumbing and heating, relined the chimneys, put in a new sprinkler system and had the roofs and gutters replaced and the exterior stucco repaired. As of 2011, he was awaiting approval from Pitkin County for a new sewage treatment system, needed if any sort of expanded resort operations were to resume or begin.

In September 2016, it was once again listed for auction, by Sotheby's. Two months later, it was sold to the owners of The Hotel Denver in Glenwood Springs who are continuing the historic tours and have opened up a ten-room, boutique hotel in the castle.

== See also ==
- List of castles in the United States
- National Register of Historic Places listings in Pitkin County, Colorado
