= Redstone, Colorado =

Census-designated place in Pitkin County, CO, USA

- Census-designated place
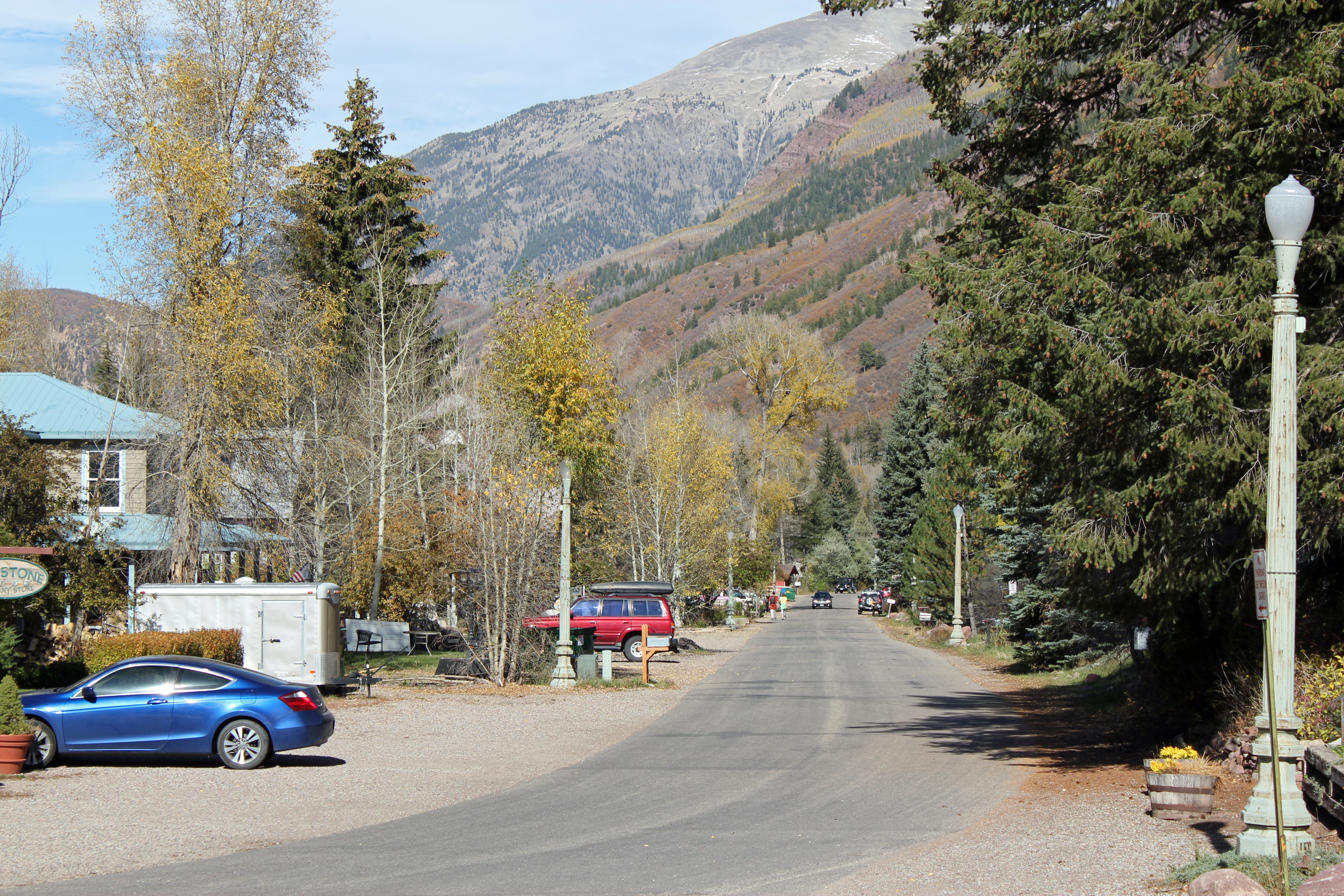
- View north up Redstone Boulevard
- Etymology: Red sandstone on nearby cliffs
- Nickname: The Ruby of the Rockies
- Location of the Redstone CDP in Pitkin County, Colorado
- Coordinates: 39°11′10″N 107°14′45″W
- Country: United States
- State: Colorado
- County: Pitkin
- Founded: 1898

Government
  - Type: Unincorporated town

Area
  - Total: 0.438 sq mi (1.134 km^{2})
  - Land: 0.438 sq mi (1.134 km^{2})
  - Water: 0 sq mi (0.000 km^{2})
- Elevation: 7,176 ft (2,187 m)

Population (2020)
  - Total: 127
  - Density: 290/sq mi (112/km^{2})
- Time zone: UTC-7 (MST)
  - Summer (DST): UTC-6 (MDT)
- ZIP Code: 81623
- Area code: 970
- GNIS feature ID: 2583286

Redstone is an unincorporated town and a census-designated place (CDP) located in and governed by Pitkin County, Colorado, United States. The CDP is a part of the Glenwood Springs, CO Micropolitan Statistical Area. The population of the Redstone CDP was 127 at the 2020 United States census. The Carbondale post office (Zip Code 81623) serves Redstone postal addresses.

The village is listed on the National Register of Historic Places as a historic district and includes several properties that are also separately listed on the National Register.

== History ==
Redstone was established in the late 19th century by industrialist John Cleveland Osgood as part of a coal mining enterprise. Osgood's coal empire also spurred construction of the Crystal River Railroad and Redstone's historic dwellings.

As an experiment in "enlightened industrial paternalism," Osgood constructed 84 cottages and a 40-room inn, all with indoor plumbing and electricity, for his coal miners and cokers, as well as modern bathhouse facilities, a club house with a library and a theatre, and a school. Most of these Craftsman-era Swiss-style cottages are still used as homes.

=== Cleveholm ===
A dominant feature of Redstone is Cleveholm Manor, commonly called "Redstone Castle," an opulent 42-room Tudor-style mansion that Osgood built for his second wife, Swedish Countess Alma Regina Shelgrem. Construction of Cleveholm Manor, which was designed by New York architects Boal and Harnois, began in 1897 and was completed in 1901. The Castle was part of a 72-acre (29 ha) estate that also included servants' quarters, a gamekeeper's lodge, a carriage house, and a greenhouse. Cleveholm Manor and the gamekeeper's cottage are both independently listed on the National Register as Osgood Castle and Osgood Gamekeeper's Lodge, respectively. As of 2004, the Castle still contained 75 percent of its original furnishings.

The historic inn in Redstone, which is independently listed on the National Register as Redstone Inn, is now operated as a resort inn, offering year-round accommodations.

== Geography ==
The Redstone CDP has an area of 280 acres (1.134 km^{2}), all land.

=== Climate ===
Redstone has a humid continental climate (Koppen: Dfb). Summers are warm with cool nights and winters are cold with extremely heavy snowfall averaging 170 inches (430 cm) annually.

Climate data for Redstone, Colorado
Month	Jan	Feb	Mar	Apr	May	Jun	Jul	Aug	Sep	Oct	Nov	Dec	Year
Mean daily maximum °F (°C)	33.1 (0.6)	36.2 (2.3)	42.7 (5.9)	51.1 (10.6)	60.5 (15.8)	71.8 (22.1)	76.4 (24.7)	74.6 (23.7)	67.0 (19.4)	55.3 (12.9)	39.2 (4.0)	31.5 (−0.3)	53.3 (11.8)
Mean daily minimum °F (°C)	7.7 (−13.5)	11.5 (−11.4)	17.3 (−8.2)	24.5 (−4.2)	31.9 (−0.1)	39.4 (4.1)	44.2 (6.8)	43.8 (6.6)	36.7 (2.6)	28.0 (−2.2)	17.5 (−8.1)	9.0 (−12.8)	26.0 (−3.4)
Average precipitation inches (mm)	1.78 (45)	2.41 (61)	3.09 (78)	2.04 (52)	2.30 (58)	1.48 (38)	2.23 (57)	1.67 (42)	2.98 (76)	3.02 (77)	2.64 (67)	2.03 (52)	27.67 (703)
Average snowfall inches (cm)	26.0 (66)	29.9 (76)	32.4 (82)	12.1 (31)	5.3 (13)	0.5 (1.3)	0 (0)	0 (0)	0.5 (1.3)	6.9 (18)	26.4 (67)	29.5 (75)	170.4 (433)
Source: The Western Regional Climate Center

== Demographics ==
The United States Census Bureau initially defined the Redstone CDP for the 2010 United States census.

Redstone CDP, Colorado
Year	Pop.	±%
2010	130	—
2020	127	−2.3%
Source: United States Census Bureau

== Education ==
It is in the Roaring Fork School District RE-1.

== See also ==
- Glenwood Springs, CO Micropolitan Statistical Area
- National Register of Historic Places listings in Pitkin County, Colorado
