= National Register of Historic Places listings in Gunnison County, Colorado =

Location of Gunnison County in Colorado

This is a list of the National Register of Historic Places listings in Gunnison County, Colorado.

This is intended to be a complete list of the properties and districts on the National Register of Historic Places in Gunnison County, Colorado, United States. The locations of National Register properties and districts for which the latitude and longitude coordinates are included below, may be seen in a map.

There are 22 properties and districts listed on the National Register in the county.

This National Park Service list is complete through NPS recent listings posted July 10, 2026.

== Current listings ==
	Name on the Register	Image	Date listed	Location	City or town	Description
1	Alpine Tunnel Historic District	Alpine Tunnel Historic District	April 1, 1996 (#80004632)	Along the Denver, South Park and Pacific Railroad tracks from Quartz to Hancock; 38°37′46″N 106°24′02″W	Pitkin vicinity	First railroad tunnel over the Continental Divide, now sealed shut.
2	Chance Gulch Site		December 6, 2006 (#06001102)	Address Restricted	Gunnison vicinity	
3	Crested Butte Denver and Rio Grande Railroad Depot	Crested Butte Denver and Rio Grande Railroad Depot	May 10, 2001 (#01000444)	716 Elk Ave. 38°52′11″N 106°58′41″W	Crested Butte	
4	Crystal Mill	Crystal Mill	July 5, 1985 (#85001493)	County Road 3, 7 miles southeast of Marble; 39°03′32″N 107°06′14″W	Crystal	
5	Curecanti Archeological District	Curecanti Archeological District	August 15, 1984 (#84000852)	Curecanti National Recreation Area; 38°28′14″N 107°18′05″W	Gunnison vicinity	5,000 acre area of the Curecanti National Recreation Area
6	Edgerton House	Edgerton House	April 1, 1998 (#98000293)	514 W. Gunnison Ave. 38°32′33″N 106°55′58″W	Gunnison	
7	Fisher-Zugelder House and Smith Cottage	Fisher-Zugelder House and Smith Cottage	January 5, 1984 (#84000853)	601 N. Wisconsin St. 38°33′00″N 106°55′41″W	Gunnison	
8	Gunnison River Bridge I	Gunnison River Bridge I	October 15, 2002 (#02001152)	U.S. Highway 50 service road at milepost 155.41; 38°31′58″N 106°57′08″W	Gunnison vicinity	Pratt through truss bridge spanning Gunnison River overflow
9	Gunnison River Bridge II	Gunnison River Bridge II	October 15, 2002 (#02001151)	U.S. Highway 50 service road at milepost 155.59; 38°32′02″N 106°56′57″W	Gunnison	Pratt through truss bridge spanning Gunnison River
10	Haxby House	Haxby House	April 4, 1996 (#96000355)	101 W. Silver; 39°04′22″N 107°11′16″W	Marble	
11	Johnson Stage Station	Johnson Stage Station	August 28, 2017 (#16000667)	2.2 mi. S. of the jct. of Cty. Rd. 64 & US 149; 38°19′14″N 107°13′23″W	Powderhorn vicinity	
12	Marble City State Bank Building	Marble City State Bank Building	September 17, 1999 (#99001146)	105 W. Main St. 39°04′19″N 107°11′17″W	Marble	
13	Marble High School	Marble High School	August 3, 1989 (#89000989)	412 Main St. 39°04′18″N 107°11′32″W	Marble	
14	Marble Jailhouse	Marble Jailhouse	November 22, 2016 (#16000783)	209 E. State St. 39°04′16″N 107°11′06″W	Marble	
15	Marble Mill Site	Marble Mill Site	February 7, 1979 (#79000610)	Park and W. 3rd Sts. 39°04′09″N 107°11′31″W	Marble	
16	Marble Town Hall	Marble Town Hall	August 3, 1989 (#89000988)	407 Main St. 39°04′19″N 107°11′31″W	Marble	
17	William D. Parry House	William D. Parry House	August 3, 1989 (#89000987)	115 Main St. 39°04′19″N 107°11′19″W	Marble	
18	Rimrock School	Rimrock School	October 12, 2000 (#00001195)	County Road 24; 38°23′21″N 107°29′05″W	Sapinero vicinity	
19	St. Paul's Church	St. Paul's Church	August 3, 1989 (#89000990)	123 State St. 39°04′16″N 107°11′21″W	Marble	
20	Town of Crested Butte	Town of Crested Butte	May 29, 1974 (#74002279)	Roughly bounded by Maroon Ave., 8th St., White Rock Ave., and 1st St.; also roughly bounded by Gothic Ave., 6th St., White Rock Ave., and 1st St. 38°52′12″N 106°58′39″W	Crested Butte	Second set of addresses represents a boundary increase
21	Vienna Bakery-Johnson Restaurant	Vienna Bakery-Johnson Restaurant	January 5, 2005 (#04001425)	122-124 N. Main St. 38°32′42″N 106°55′34″W	Gunnison	
22	Webster Building	Webster Building	May 17, 1984 (#84000857)	229 N. Main St. 38°32′45″N 106°55′36″W	Gunnison	

== See also ==
- List of National Historic Landmarks in Colorado
- List of National Register of Historic Places in Colorado
- Bibliography of Colorado
- Geography of Colorado
- History of Colorado
- Index of Colorado-related articles
- List of Colorado-related lists
- Outline of Colorado
