= Marble High School =

- U.S. National Register of Historic Places
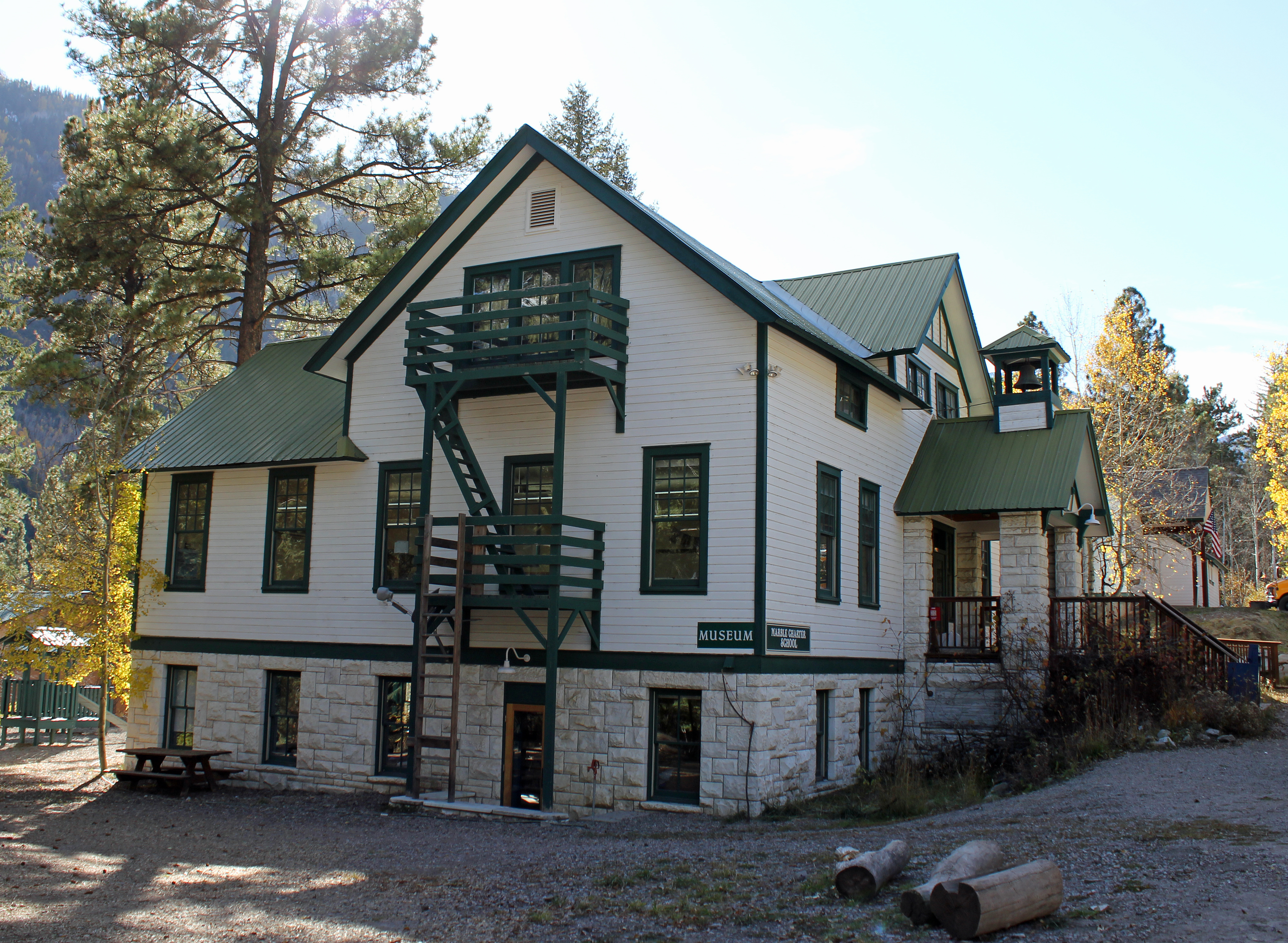
- Marble High School in October 2011

- Location within Colorado Location within the United States
- Nearest city: Marble, Colorado
- Coordinates: 39°04′18.46″N 107°11′32.43″W
- Area: Less than one acre
- Built: 1910
- Architectural style: Craftsman-style
- NRHP reference No.: 89000989
- Added to NRHP: June 2nd, 1989

Location of Gunnison County in Colorado

Marble High School is a school and historical site preserved by the National Register of Historic Places located in Marble, Colorado. It was built in 1910, and is the only surviving building in Marble that utilizes marble in its construction, despite the name of the town. It is currently owned by Marble Historical Society, who operate the building as a museum.

== History ==
=== Background ===
Marble High School is located at 412 Main Street in Marble, Colorado. The town was founded in northern Gunnison County in 1899 by settlers and miners. A surge in the population of the town began in 1905, when the Colorado-Yule Marble Company was founded to mine the marble deposits found in the area. The marble around the town is known as Yule Marble, and is considered to be some of the finest and purest marble in the world. Yule marble from the town has been used in the construction of places such as:

- Lincoln Memorial in Washington, D.C.
- Tomb of the Unknown Soldier in Arlington National Cemetery
- Colorado State Capitol Building in Denver, Colorado
- Arkansas State Capitol Building in Little Rock, Arkansas
- Utah State Capitol Building in Salt Lake City, Utah
- San Francisco City Hall in San Francisco, California

The success of the Colorado-Yule Marble Company and the local mining operations caused a significant population spike. The town grew from 150 inhabitants in 1905 to approximately 1,500 by the year 1915. The major increase in residents made the need for the town to build a new schoolhouse.

=== Design and construction ===
Construction efforts began in 1910 and ran until the school opened in 1912. The design of the structure can be described as "pattern-book", a common style for schoolhouses in the time period it was built in. The building has changed very little since its construction, and still contains much of its original furnishings and interior.

When describing the structure, Barbara Sudler of the National Park Service stated:

"...the Marble High School exhibits Craftsman-style influences, which can be seen in the form of its overhanging eaves, "elephantine" marble porch piers, and nine-over-one windows... The Marble High School is a symmetrically arranged, two-story, side-gabled, wood-frame building with a raised marble foundation and a marble porch. The building has shiplap siding and is painted white with green trim, the colors of the Colorado-Yule Marble Company, which donated the original paint for the school. The building footprint is U-shaped; the inset bay at the rear of the building leads to an entrance to the furnace room."

Despite the name of the town, Marble High School is the only surviving structure in Marble to feature Yule Marble in its construction.

=== Functions ===
The school was completed and opened to the children of Marble in 1912. As many of the marble workers in the town had arrived from Italy, a number of the classes were taught in both English and Italian. The first teacher at the school was A.R. Ambrosini, an Italian immigrant. The curriculum of the school was centered around these things: English language lessons and classes related to the marble production of the town. These latter classes included subjects such as mechanical drawing, design, architecture, and sculpting.

The prosperity and population of the town dwindled massively during World War I when a majority of the town's 1,500 residents returned to their native Italy to serve in the Italian Army. By 1918, the population of the town had dropped to approximately 50 residents. The exodus of the town's craftsmen and both the Great Depression and World War II effectively doomed Marble, and in 1948 the Gunnison Watershed School District opted to close the high school.

== Restoration ==
=== Museum ===
The high school is currently home to a museum operated by the Marble Historical Society, who came into possession of the building in 1985. Up until that time, the building had been left abandoned and empty for decades. The Marble Historical Society refurbished and renovated the building, restoring it to its original appearance and state. The museum features original furnishings, interiors, and items from the town. Visitors are able to tour the museum in the spring and summer months.
