= Alpine Tunnel =

Tunnel in Colorado

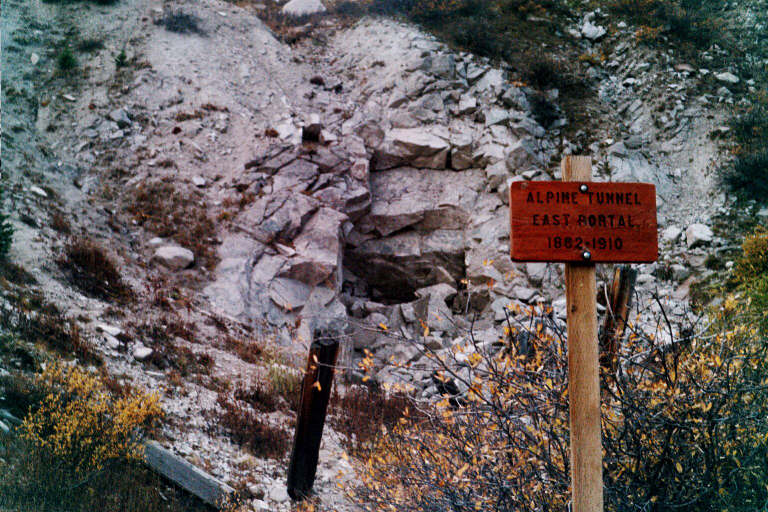
- Interactive map of Alpine Tunnel

Overview
- Official name: Alpine Tunnel
- Location: Continental Divide, Chaffee / Gunnison counties, Colorado
- Coordinates: 38°38′45″N 106°24′32″W
- System: DSP&P Railroad

Operation
- Opened: 1882
- Closed: 1910

Technical
- Length: 1,772 ft (540 m)

Alpine Tunnel is a 1,772 ft (540 m) narrow gauge railroad tunnel located east of Pitkin, Colorado, on the former Denver, South Park and Pacific Railroad route from Denver to Gunnison. At an elevation of 11,523 feet (3,512 m), it was the first tunnel constructed across the Continental Divide in Colorado and was the highest railroad tunnel in North America at the time of its construction in 1882. The line was abandoned less than 30 years later, in 1910, after a series of accidents and problems in and around the tunnel. Now the tunnel is sealed, and the remaining trackbed serves as a trail for ohv enthusiasts, hikers and bicyclists.

== History ==
Location of the tunnel portals and establishing a center line of the bore were completed in December 1879. Construction took place from 1880–1881, by Cummings & Co. Construction company, and the tunnel was "holed through" on July 26, 1881. This was the highest and most expensive tunnel built up until that time. It is more than two miles (3 km) above sea level, with its highest point at 11,523.7 feet (3,512.4 m). It is 500 feet (150 m) under Altman Pass, later to be renamed Alpine Pass to prevent confusion, with a 1,825-foot (556 m) bore. It took 18 months to complete, with most of the construction done during the winter months.

The DSP&P had anticipated boring the Alpine tunnel through solid rock, taking about 6 months to complete. In the event, the line of the tunnel was found to run primarily through loose rock and clay; this very unstable ground required substantial timbering. The additional work necessitated by the unexpected ground conditions was a major contributor to the 18 month construction time.

The tunnel was abandoned in 1910 by the Colorado & Southern due to minor damage in the interior. This was not considered to be worth repairing due to a lack of traffic, as the line failed to get much beyond Gunnison on the west side. The Gunnison Division of the Colorado & Southern was abandoned from St. Elmo on the east side of the pass to Quartz on the west side. The line from Quartz to Baldwin was given to the Denver & Rio Grande Western in exchange for some little used lines around Leadville.

== Present day ==
The east portal of the tunnel has collapsed and the west portal has been covered by landslides. The former railbed is now a hiking trail on the east side, and a rough road over the former railbed on the west side leads to a restored train station. The road to the west portal was damaged in 2016 and was reopened on August 1, 2022, until August 31, 2022.

Little remains of the station complex built by the railroad to service its trains and workers at this remote and inhospitable location. Volunteers have restored the railroad's 1883 Alpine Tunnel telegraph office and reconstructed the station platform, 120 feet (37 m) of rail track, a turntable, and an outhouse. Only ruins remain of the section house and engine house, and other buildings and railroad infrastructure have disappeared. In 2023, work began to reinforce the Palisade Wall with the intent of reopening public access to the Alpine Tunnel Road.

The Alpine Tunnel Historic District was placed on the National Register of Historic Places in April 1996. It is typically open from July to September.

== Gallery ==
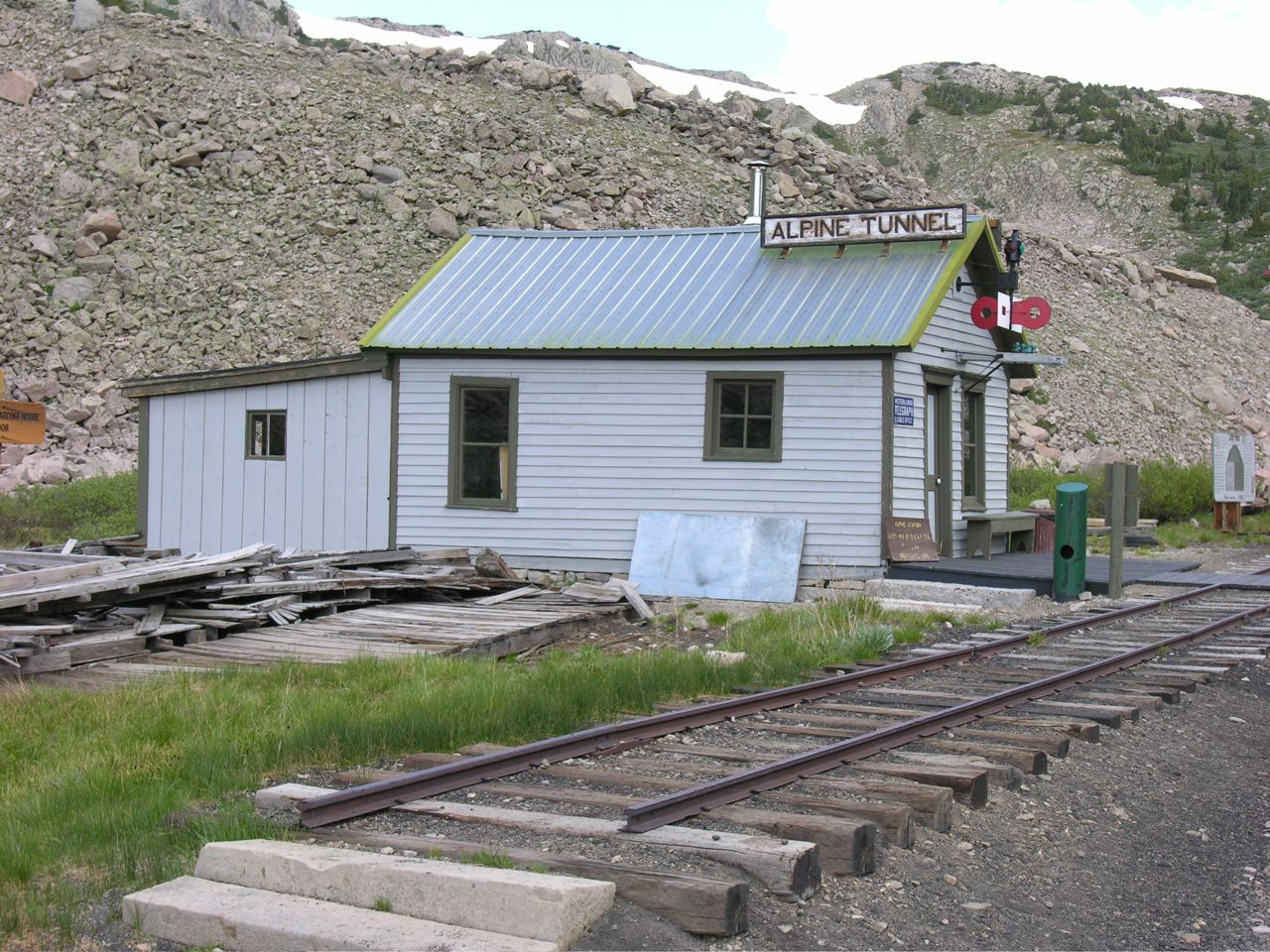
Alpine Tunnel telegraph station

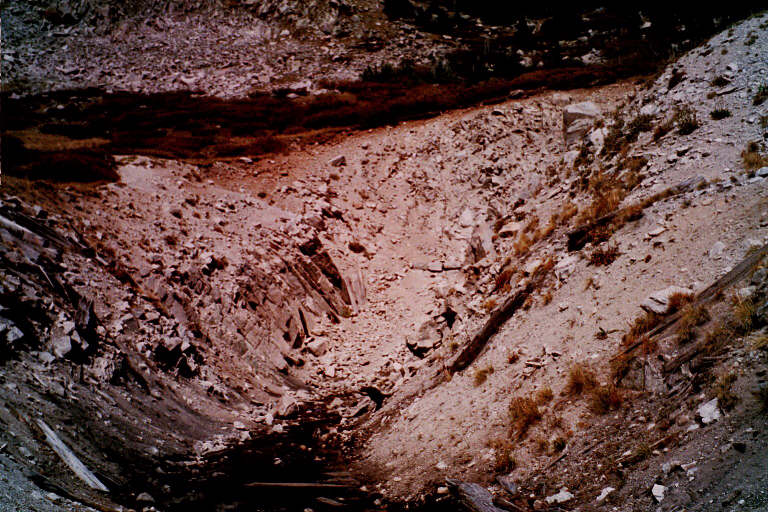
Western Portal

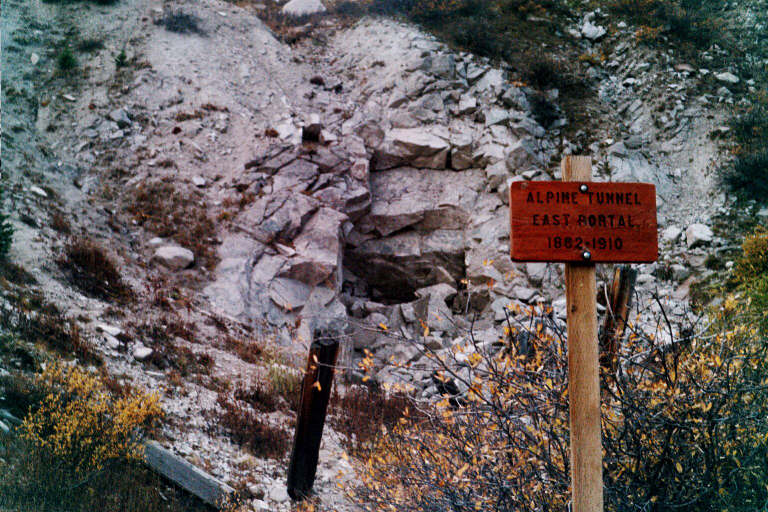
Eastern Portal

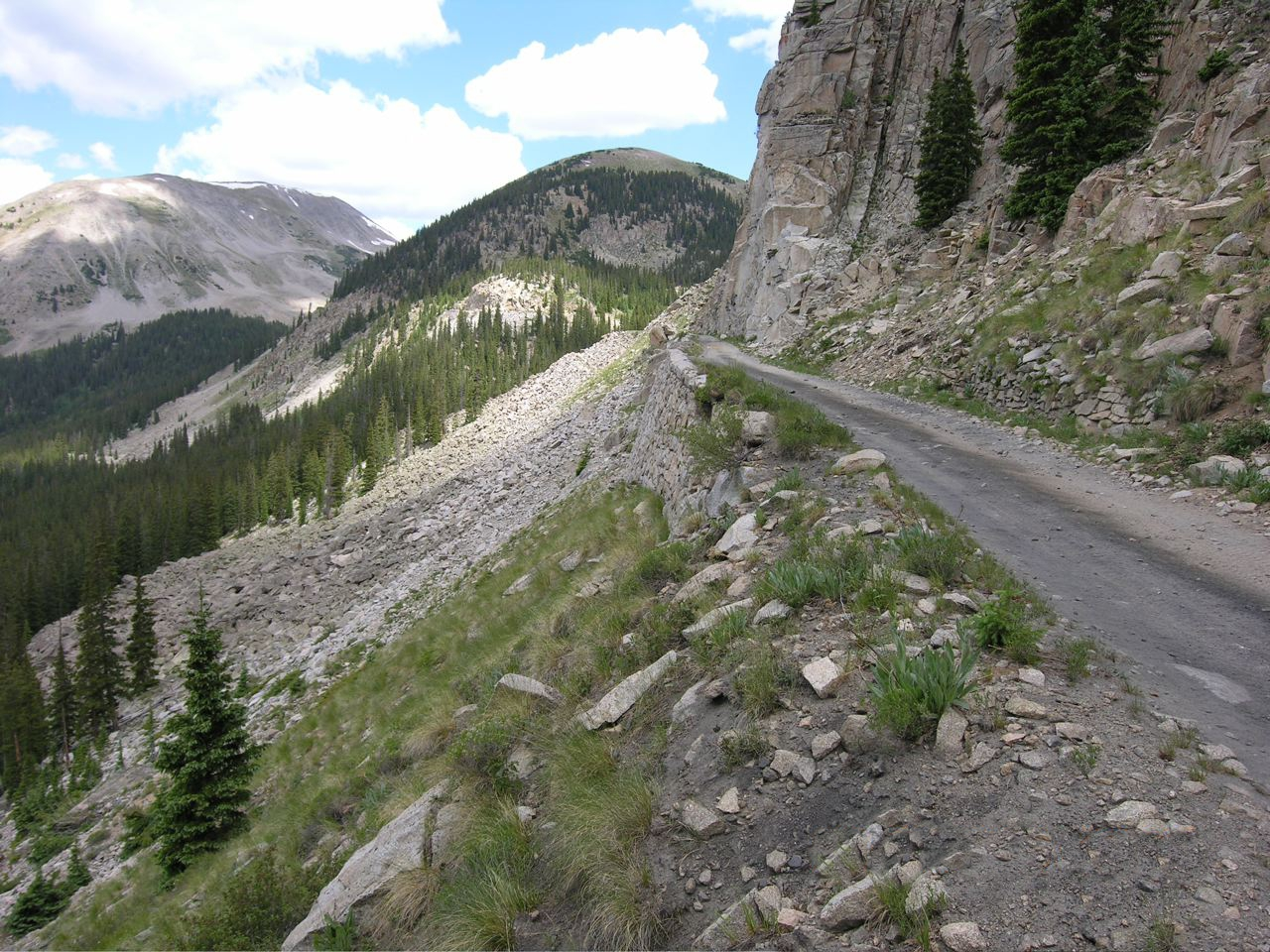
Palisades west of Alpine Tunnel

== See also ==
- National Register of Historic Places listings in Gunnison County, Colorado
- Railroad tunnel
- Rail trail
- Narrow gauge railroads in the United States
- Historic preservation
