= Gunnison River Bridges I & II =

- Gunnison River Bridge I Gunnison River Bridge II
- U.S. National Register of Historic Places
- Location within Colorado Location within the United States
- Location: Gunnison, Colorado and vicinity
- Area: less than one acre
- NRHP reference No.: 02001151 and 02001152
- Added to NRHP: October 15, 2002

Gunnison River Bridge I and Gunnison River Bridge II are two 129 feet (39 m) long bridges built during 1926–27. They were separately listed on the National Register of Historic Places in 2002.

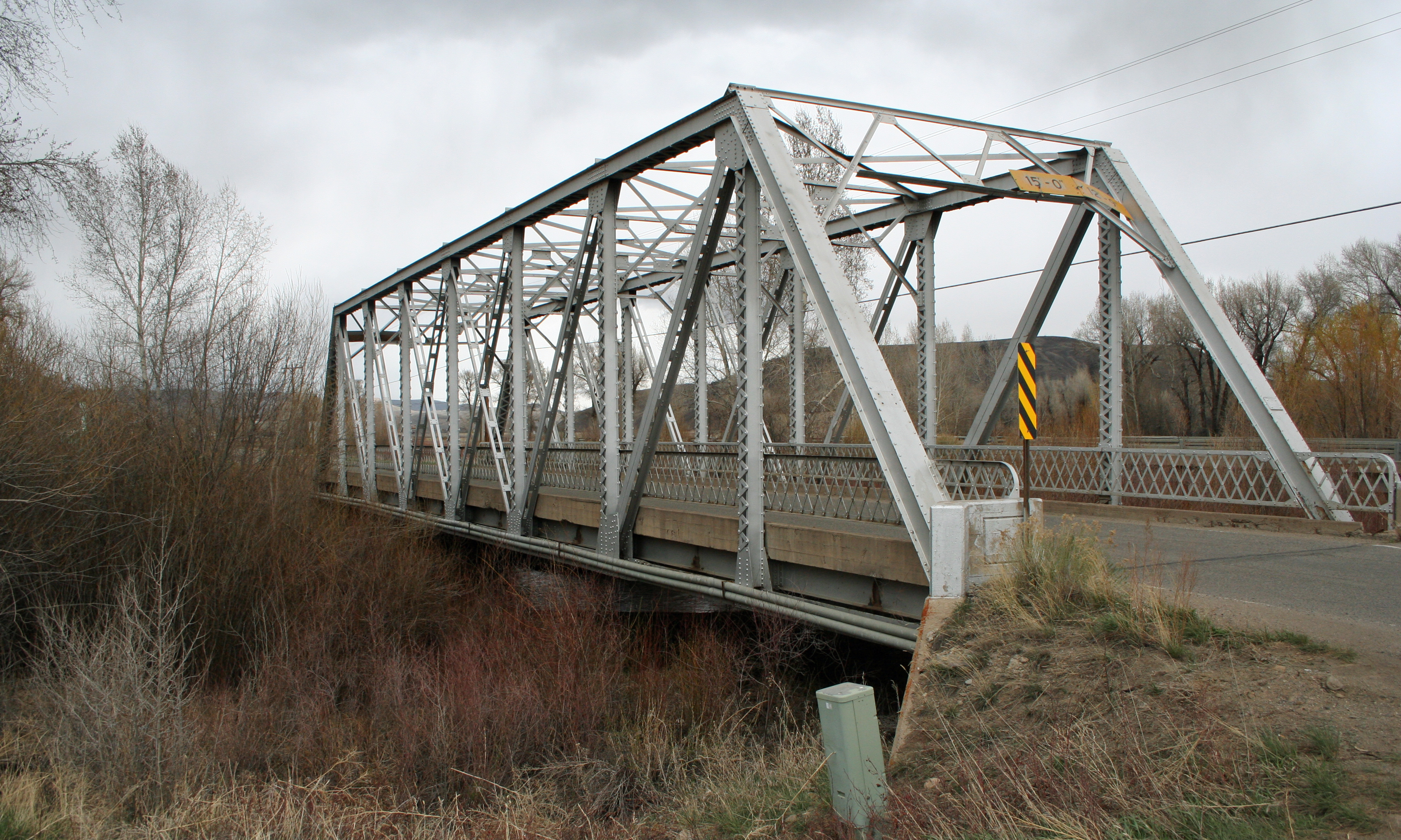
I

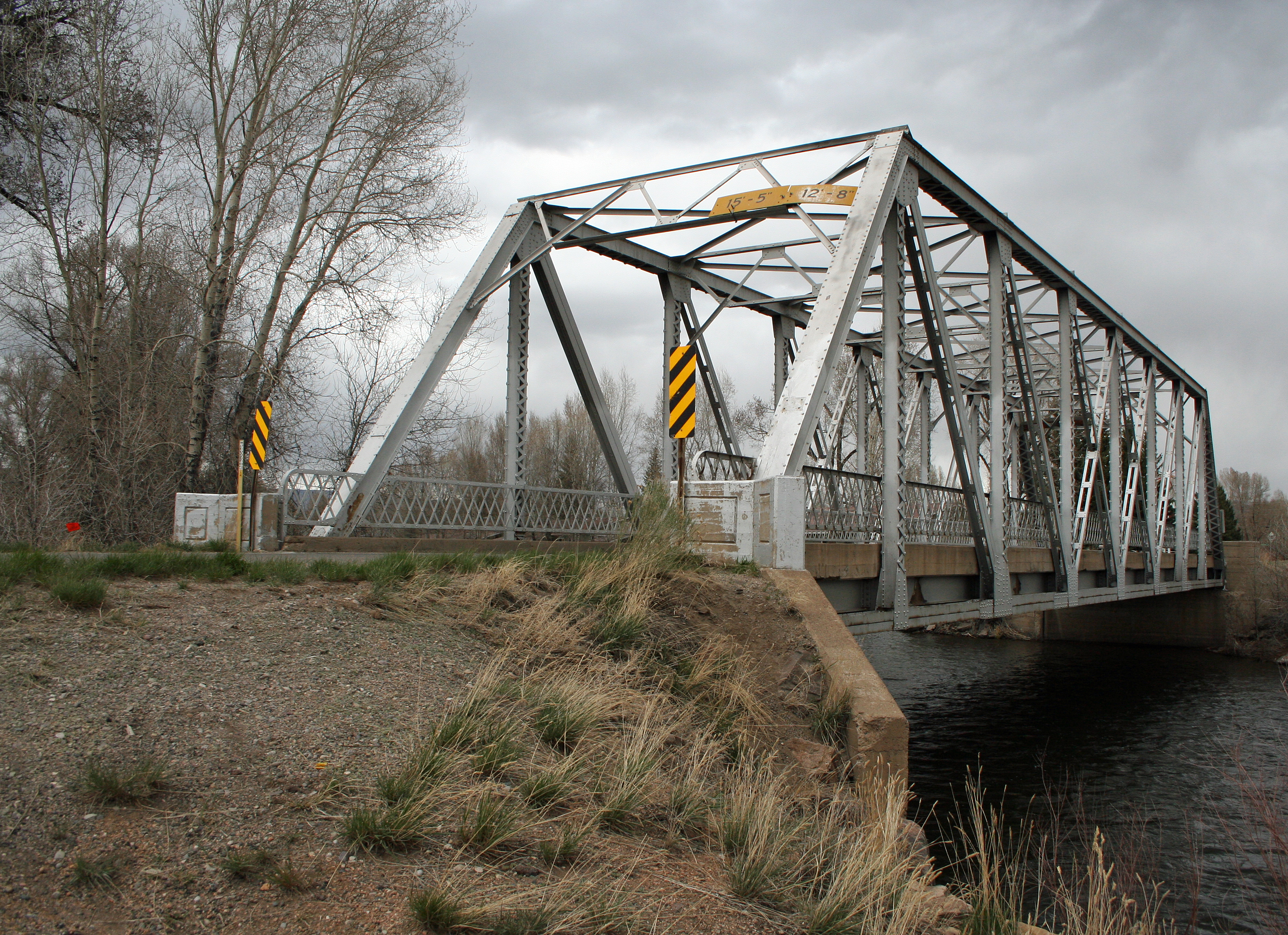
II

The bridges carry what is now the U.S. Highway 50 service road. Bridge I brings it over Gunnison River overflow at mileposts 155.41 just outside the city of Gunnison while Bridge II, at 155.59, brings it over the Gunnison River proper into the city limits.

The bridges are located at 38.532711°N 106.952259°W (Bridge I, further to the west, spanning overflow) and 38.533947°N 106.949168°W (Bridge II, further to the east, spanning the main river).

The two bridges are Pratt truss through truss bridges, 129 feet (39 m) long. Their trusses were fabricated by the American Bridge Company.

== See also ==
- National Register of Historic Places listings in Gunnison County, Colorado
