= Marble Community Church =

Historic church in Colorado, United States

- St. Paul's Church
- U.S. National Register of Historic Places
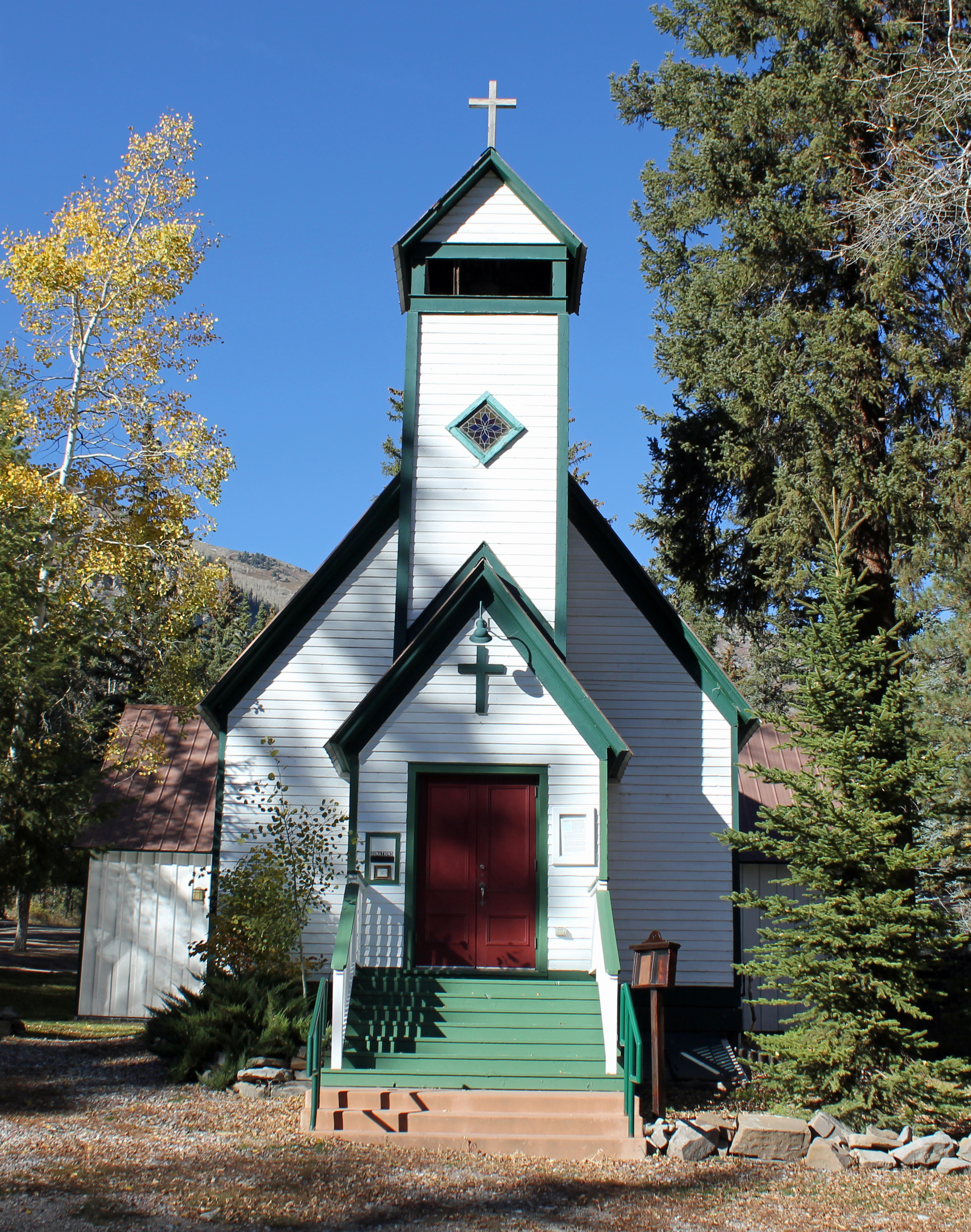
- The church in 2011

- Location within Colorado Location within the United States
- Location: Marble, Colorado
- Coordinates: 39°4′16″N 107°11′21″W
- Built: 1908
- Architectural style: Gothic
- MPS: Historic Resources of Marble, Colorado and Vicinity
- NRHP reference No.: 89000990
- Added to NRHP: August 3, 1989

Marble Community Church, formerly called St. Paul's Church, is a historic Episcopal church at 123 State Street in Marble, Colorado. The church's main building was originally the building of the St. John's Episcopal Chapel, which was built in Aspen, Colorado in 1886. The church was listed on the National Register of Historic Places in 1989.

== History ==
=== Construction and early History ===
By the beginning of the 20th century, Marble was home to an active children's sunday school, though the town lacked a church building for which to hold the school. In 1908, the one-room St. John's Episcopal Chapel in Aspen was no longer required and the diocese made it available for relocation to Marble. The chapel, originally constructed in 1886, was dismantled and moved by railroad car to Marble where it was reassembled on two lots of land at 123 State Street that had been purchased with a $2500 donation from the Episcopal Women's Guild. The new church was renamed and dedicated as St. Paul's. Shortly after the establishment, an extension was carried out to enlarge the church through the addition of two side rooms. Further enlargement of the church was carried out in 1911, with the addition of a belfry containing a 500-pound bell.

=== Re-establishment ===
St. Paul's Church was a center for religious and social activities and provided for three congregations: Episcopal, Union Congregational, and Catholic, as well as acting as a meeting place for other groups. The imminence of the approaching World War II however, brought about the closure of the town's local marble quarries and Marble Company mill. As a result, the town saw a decline in its population which resulted in the closure of the church in 1941. The building was left empty and unused for a number of years and was given over to the care of a local family, the Williams brothers.

The church would remain empty for more than ten years, until the early 1950s, when permission was granted to reuse the old building to hold prayer meetings and services. Renewed interest in these services grew, and shortly after a congregation had formed and adopted the name Marble Community Church. George A. Drake, who would later become a president of Grinnell College served the congregation throughout 1960 and 1961. In 1974, the congregation received permission to move back into the old church in exchange for assuming responsibility for the care and maintenance of the building.

In 1983, The Marble Community Church became incorporated under the laws of Colorado and after negotiation the Rev. Fr. Cyril Coverly of the Episcopal Diocese was able to present the deed to the building and land back to the congregation on July 7, 1985. The church was listed on the National Register of Historic Places in 1989 as a Historic Place in Gunnison County, Colorado.

The church represents an example of an early religious structure in a mining community and is the town's only example of Gothic architecture. In 2002 renovations were begun to update the original church building as well as to add a fellowship hall. The project was subsequently completed in 2004, at which time a breezeway to connect these two buildings was also carried out. The church celebrated its 100th anniversary in 2008.

== See also ==
- National Register of Historic Places listings in Gunnison County, Colorado
