= Edgerton House =

- U.S. National Register of Historic Places
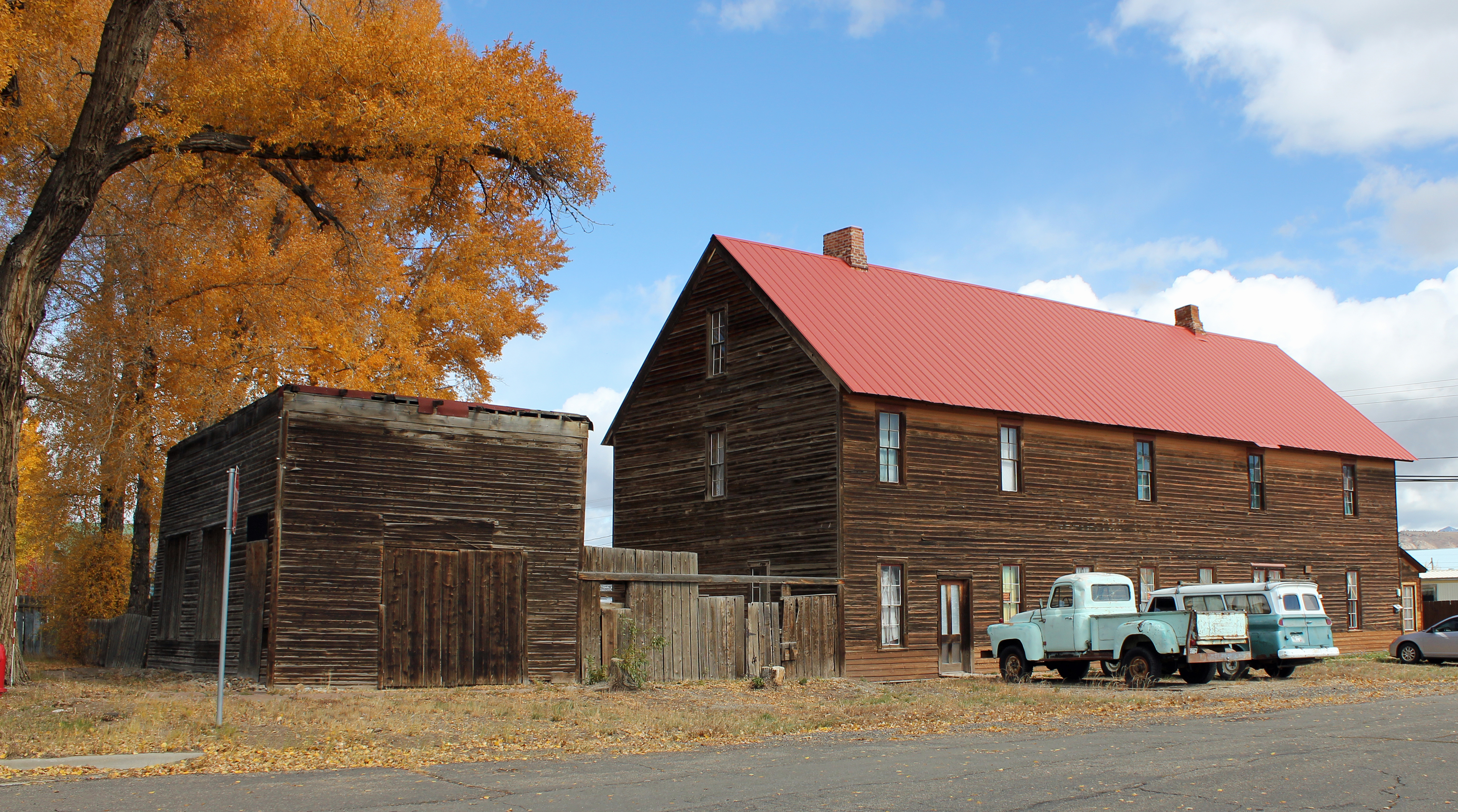

- Location within Colorado Location within the United States
- Location: 514 W. Gunnison Ave., Gunnison, Colorado
- Coordinates: 38°32′33″N 106°55′58″W
- Area: less than one acre
- Built: 1881
- NRHP reference No.: 98000293
- Added to NRHP: April 1, 1998

Edgerton House, at 514 W. Gunnison Ave. in Gunnison, Colorado, was listed on the National Register of Historic Places in 1998.

The property includes three contributing buildings: a two-story boarding house/hotel which closed in 1931, a lunch counter/cafe which operated from 1898 to 1929, and a privy.

== See also ==
- National Register of Historic Places listings in Gunnison County, Colorado
