= Cascade Building =

Historic building in Portland, Oregon, U.S.

- Bedell Building
- U.S. National Register of Historic Places
- Portland Historic Landmark
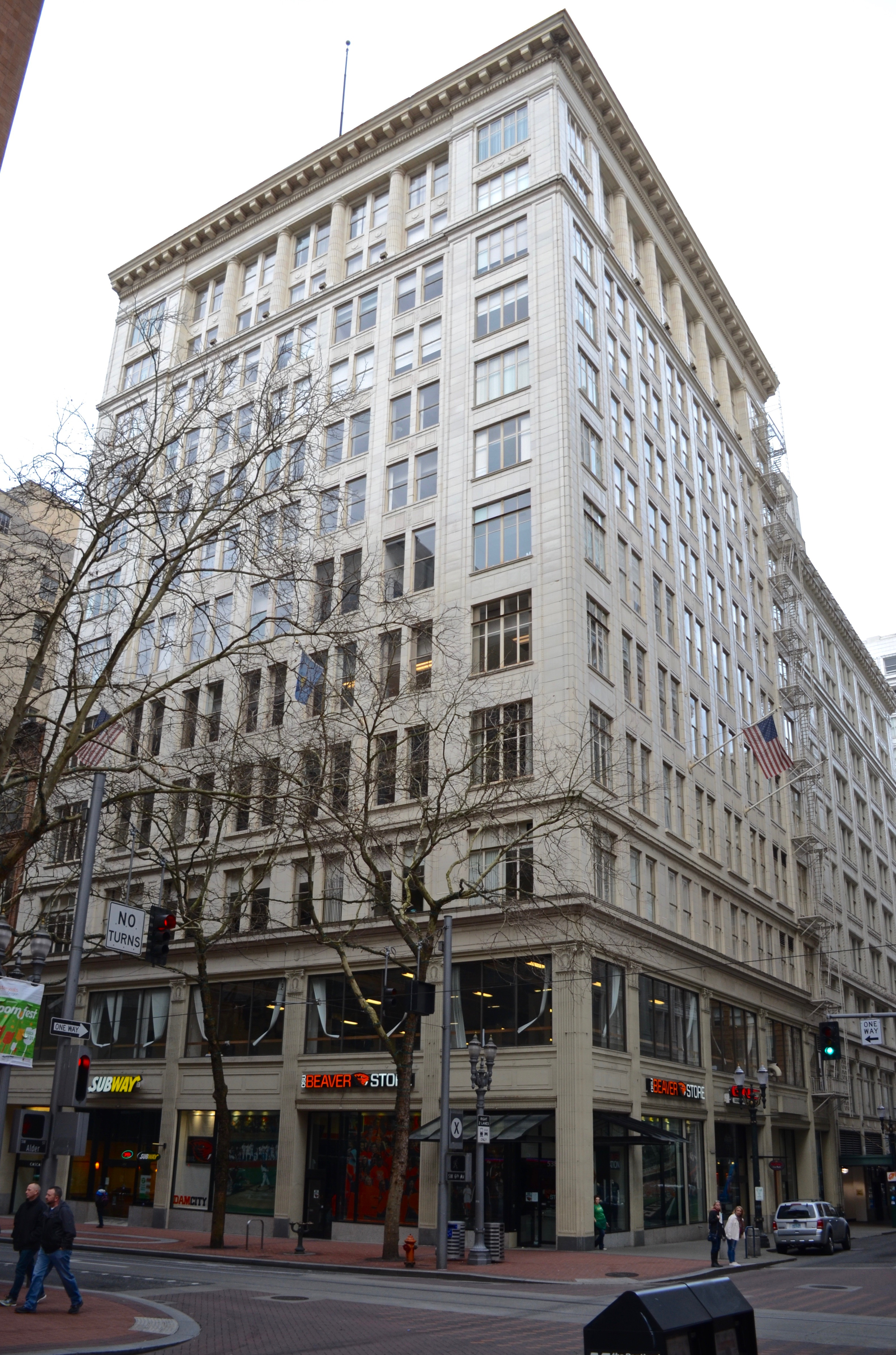
- The building's exterior in 2018

- Location within Portland, Oregon
- Location: 520–538 SW 6th Avenue; Portland, Oregon
- Coordinates: 45°31′11″N 122°40′40″W
- Area: 0.2 acres (0.081 ha)
- Built: 1925
- Architect: George A. Schonewald, Albert E. Doyle
- Architectural style: Late 19th and Early 20th Century American Movements, Commercial Style
- NRHP reference No.: 89000066
- Added to NRHP: February 23, 1989

The Cascade Building (formerly known as the Bedell Building) is a historic high-rise located at 520–538 SW 6th Avenue in Downtown Portland, Oregon. It was built in 1925 and was listed on the National Register of Historic Places on February 23, 1989.

== See also ==
- National Register of Historic Places listings in Southwest Portland, Oregon
- Yule marble
