= Chance Gulch Site =

Archaeological site in Colorado, US

- U.S. National Register of Historic Places
- Location: Address restricted, near Gunnison, Colorado
- NRHP reference No.: 06001102
- Added to NRHP: December 6, 2006

The Chance Gulch Site is an archaeological site in Gunnison County, Colorado, located about 2.5 miles (4.0 km) southeast of Gunnison. It was listed on the National Register of Historic Places in 2016.

It has been studied by Western Colorado University students.
