= Yule Marble =

Marble from Colorado

Coordinates: 39°2.16′N 107°10.10′W

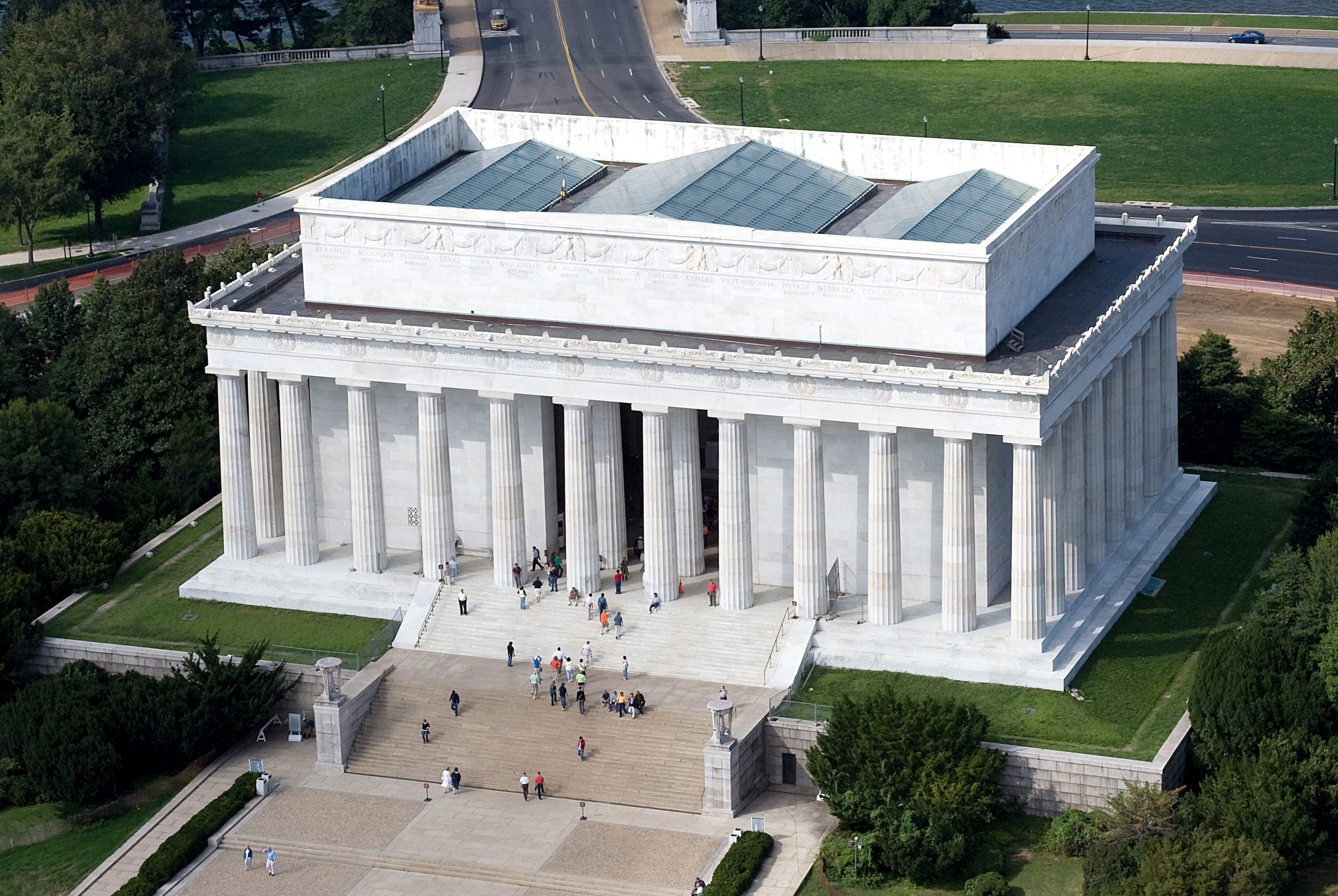
Lincoln Memorial: exterior is all Yule marble

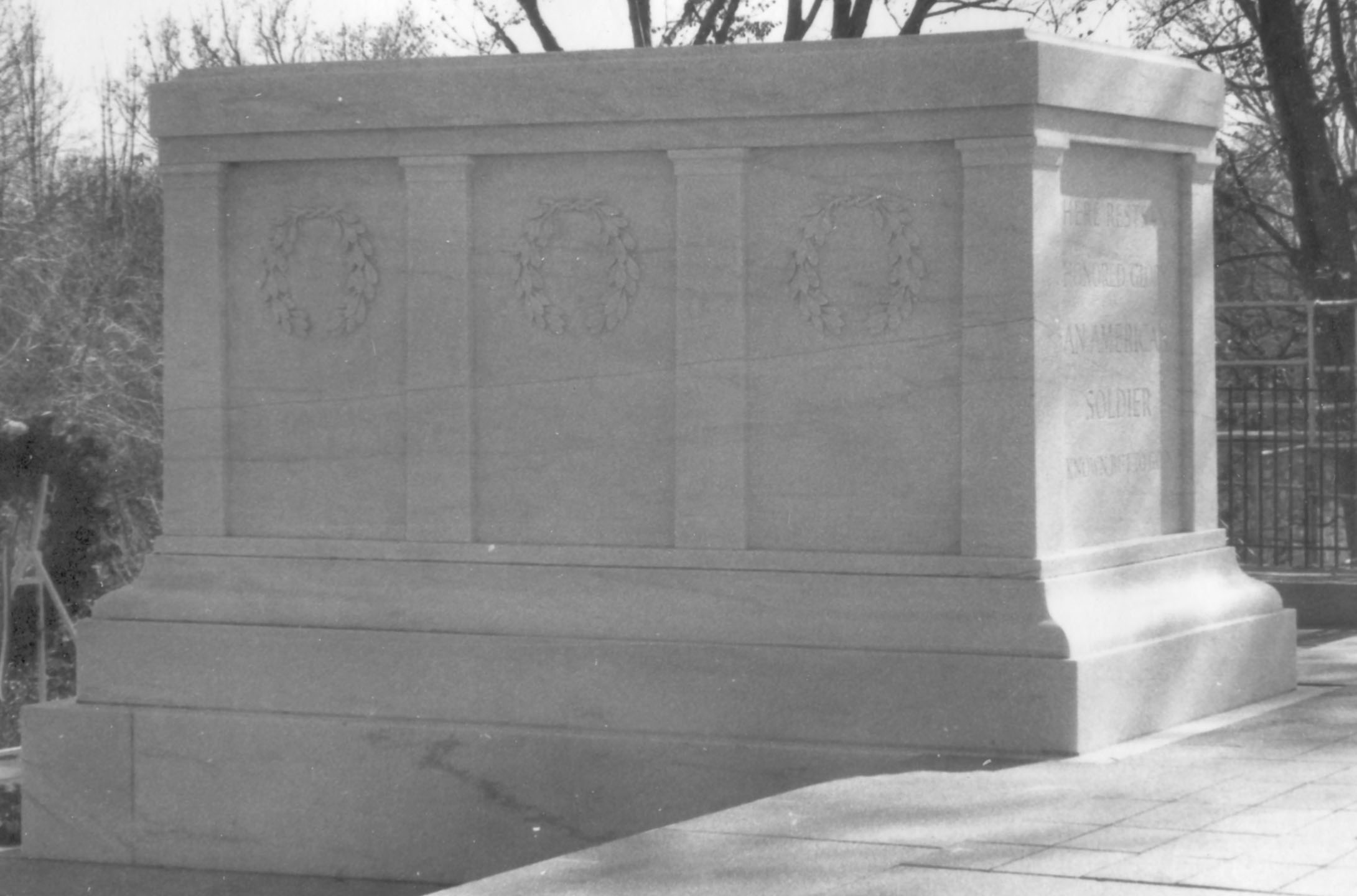
The Tomb of the Unknown Soldier at Arlington is Yule marble

Yule Marble is a marble of metamorphosed Leadville Limestone found only in the Yule Creek Valley, in the West Elk Mountains of Colorado, 2.8 miles (4.5 km) southeast of the town of Marble, Colorado. Discovered in 1873, it is quarried underground at an elevation of 9,300 feet (2,800 m) above sea level—in contrast to most marble, which is quarried from an open pit and at much lower elevations.

The localized geology created a marble that is 99.5% pure calcite, with a grain structure that gives a smooth texture, a homogeneous look, and a luminous surface. It is these qualities for which it was selected to clad the exterior of the Lincoln Memorial and a variety of other buildings throughout the United States, in spite of being more expensive than other marbles. The size of the deposits enables large blocks to be quarried, which is why the marble for the Tomb of the Unknown Soldier at Arlington National Cemetery, with its 56-long-ton (57 t) die block, was quarried from Yule Marble.

Yule's quality comes at a high price due to the cost of quarrying in a high-altitude mountain environment. This challenge has caused the industry and the town of Marble to undergo many boom-and-bust periods during the 20th Century from the time quarrying started in the mid-1880s, making the town emblematic of the economic fluctuations that beset the predominantly single-industry economy that existed before the 1990s. Technology advancements in quarrying machinery and transportation had reduced, but not solved, the cost problem that afflicts the operations prior to the 2000s.

== Geology ==
=== Development ===
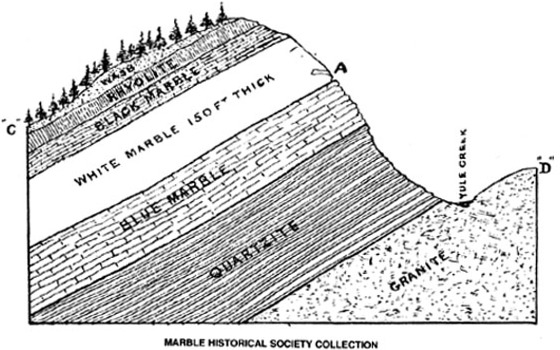
Cross Section: Yule Marble deposit of the present-day quarry. The granite of the Treasure Mountain Dome is visible on the right.

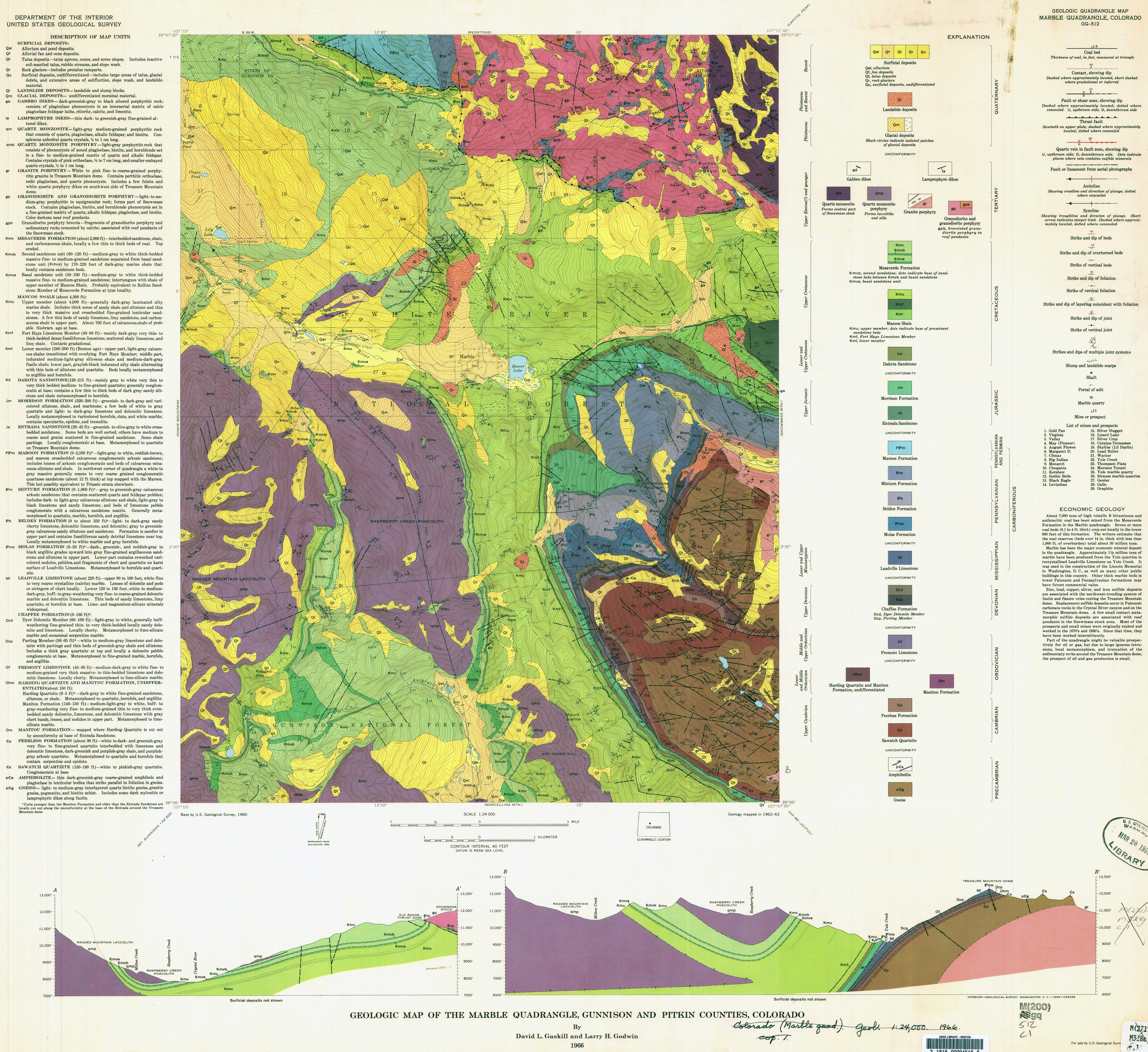
Geologic Map of Yule Creek Valley – US Geological Survey. Full-size map, zoomable.

The forces that created Yule Marble make it distinct from all other American marbles. It was formed by contact metamorphism, unlike Vermont marble and Georgia marble, which are the result of regional metamorphism, a process more associated with the orogeny and erosion of mountain ranges on a regional scale. Geologists still debate over Tennessee marble which did not undergo the same type of metamorphism, leaving it in a very unique property somewhere between metamorphic marble and sedimentary limestone.

In evaluating the marble cross-section, the United States Geological Survey found the marble is bounded above and below by unconformities. This lack of conformable contact resulted in the early dating of the limestone as Silurian rather than the currently accepted Mississippian. The lack of conformable boundaries in exposures along the Treasure Mountain dome explains the variation in reported thicknesses in the quarry area west of Yule Creek of 166–239 feet (51–73 m) about 2,000 feet (610 m) southeast of the quarry. The overlying Pennsylvanian Molas Formation was an argillite unit which was converted to hornfels and quartzite. Stratigraphically below the Leadville, the chert bearing Devonian Dyer Dolomite Member of the Chaffee Formation was altered by the metamorphism to impure silica-rich marble and occasional serpentine-bearing marble.

The Yule Marble is a metamorphic facies of the regionally distributed Leadville Limestone of Mississippian age deposited 350 million to 324 million years ago. The Leadville within the Yule area was transformed by contact metamorphism that occurred during the latest Eocene and Oligocene epochs (34 to 28 million years ago) associated with the intrusion and uplift of the nearby granitic Treasure Mountain Dome. The uplift of the Treasure Mountain Dome tilted the limestone away from the intrusion resulting in the marble bed dipping at an angle into the mountain. The marble unit along with older and younger adjacent units in the Yule Valley have a north-northwest strike paralleling the valley and variable dips of 35 to 50 degrees to the west-southwest. This local contact with the heat and pressure from the intrusion of hot granitic magma recrystallized the Leadville Limestone into a distinctive white marble. Although the Leadville Limestone covered hundreds of square miles and was the ore host at the Leadville mining district, the Yule Creek Valley is the only known location of marble in the region. When the magma cooled, it crystallized into granite.

This local geological activity resulted in a type of marble that is 99.5% pure calcite, with trace amounts of non-calcite inclusions (mainly quartz), and has a density of 170 pounds per cubic foot (2,700 kg/m^{3}). The non-calcite inclusions were caused through penetrations along the seams created by the dome uplift rather than through metamorphic contact with the uplifted dome. Though marble is on both sides of the creek, the only visible marble is the 1-mile-long (1.6 km) seam of the present-day quarry on the west side of Yule Creek. (Note: Table to right: "Chemical analysis reported on Yule Marble; Colorado Yule Marble: Building Stone of the Lincoln Memorial, US Geological Survey, 1999, Bulletin 2162, p. 4)

==== Timeline ====
Development of Yule Marble is put into context with Colorado geology by showing the passage of time from earliest rock units to the present with "Ga" = billions of years ago and "Ma" = millions of years ago.

Start	End	Geologic activity
1.78Ga	1.65Ga	Colorado forms (age of oldest exposed rocks found to date).
350Ma	324Ma	Leadville Limestone formed in a shallow, warm sea that covered Central Colorado through the accumulation of calcite from the remains of marine life. Today that limestone, which became Yule Marble, is 9,300 feet (2,800 m) above sea level.
300Ma	248Ma	Ancestral Rockies start and eroded away. The town of Marble was located at the edge of the Ancestral Rockies. Limestone was stripped away by erosion leaving the rest buried until 72 million years ago.
248Ma	70Ma	Area was a flat coastal plain over which dinosaurs roamed and during the later part was covered by another shallow sea.
72Ma	40Ma	1st of 3 uplifts (Laramide orogeny) of present-day Rockies but partially erodes.
34Ma	28Ma	2nd of 3 uplifts of the present-day Rockies. Volcanic activity with magma intrusions pushing up from below crystallized the limestone into marble. When the magma cooled it crystallized turning into granite. The upward push of the magma against the limestone resulted in the marble being tilted upward and way from the intrusion, creating the 7-mile diameter Treasure Mountain Dome. The town of Marble lies at the edge of the dome.
25Ma	5Ma	Colorado Mineral Belt forms
10Ma	Present	3rd of 3 uplifts of the Rockies – Colorado

=== Characteristics ===
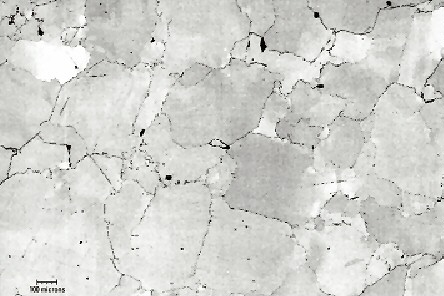
Backscattered electron image of Yule Marble grains

It is the grain of Yule Marble that gives an appearance of smooth texture, a homogeneous look, and a luminous surface that polishes well. These qualities are why it has been chosen for a number of major national and state landmarks, most notably the Lincoln Memorial. Because of its aesthetic value, architect Henry Bacon successfully urged that it be used to clad the whole exterior of the Memorial, even though it was the most expensive material. (Note: As of 1992 there were four grades of marble sold that had variances of grain size and density. "Calcite grain size of the four grades of Yule marble sold, table 4". Bulletin 2162 US Geological Survey. p. 9.)

The overall configuration of the grain is small, irregularly shaped, generally equidimensional to slightly elongated with irregular edges and does not vary significantly among the different grades (in 1992). The edges of the calcite grains are deeply crenulated (irregularly and minutely notched and scalloped). Grain sizes range primarily from 0.1 mm (0.00393 in) to 0.6 mm (0.0236 in), as determined by scanning electron microscope images. There are 2,000–3,000 grains to the square centimeter (0.1550 square inches). Where the marble is in direct contact with the intrusive granite, the most consistent change in the marble is that it becomes extremely coarse-grained, with the grain size in the contact zone being 10 mm to 20 mm (0.3937–0.7874 inches). The grains in turn are tightly bonded in the shape of a jigsaw puzzle, forming crystals which are aligned so that the long axes of the grains are essentially perpendicular to the principal veining in the deposit.

When marble does break down, the cause is weak boundaries between the grains that permit water or solutions to penetrate into the marble. As water enters, the calcite grains dissolve slightly, and the opening between the grains widens. With time, as the grain openings widen, the edges become smooth, and the grains become rounded. As the surface grains become round, they loosen and fall off the surface of the stone. Because Yule Marble is finely grained with tight bonding, water is not likely to react as quickly as with a coarse-grained, loose-textured marble. Also the crenulated boundaries of Yule Marble crystals may account for the weathering resistance, because the spaces between grains must be widened enough to free adjoining crystals.

Included in the grains are intrusions (non-calcite material) which does not vary significantly among the four grades; tests in the late 1990s confirm the 1910 amount of 0.5%. Constant inclusions in all Yules are magnesium oxide (MgO), manganese oxide (MnO), iron oxide (FeO), and strontium oxide (SrO) while other inclusions vary by quarry location. Inclusions are in four groups: quartz (the most abundant and gray in color); muscovite (mica, occurs as thin gold lines and streaks, and also occurs with quartz in clouds of gray mixed with brown); feldspar (with larger grain size 0.591 inches (15 mm) to 1.379 inches (35 mm) and gray in color but less translucent than quartz inclusions); and pyrite. Other minor inclusions are sphene, apatite, rutile, zircon, and sphalerite. An example of inclusion affect is gold veining, the result of iron or manganese, that is still quarried today.

When the physical characteristics of Yule Marble are compared to the other US marble, the results are about the same for general characteristics of weight, hardness, specific gravity, porosity, absorption, and coefficient of thermal expansion. In strength characteristics, the properties of Yule Marble are lower than most of the other marbles for compressive strength and transverse strength, but they are not unreasonably low. For ordinary uses, stone having a compressive strength of 5,000 lb per square inch is satisfactory. Test results from 1913 to 1937 ranged from 6,694 to 10,195 pounds per square inch (471 to 717 kg per square cm); in 1996, results were 14,874 (1,046 kg per square cm).

=== Quarry ===
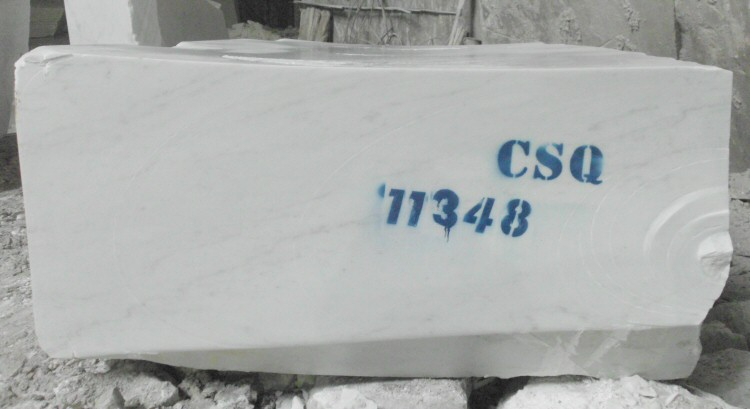
July 2011: Block of Yule Marble in the quarry, 1,300 feet (400 m) above and 3.9 miles (6.3 km) from the town of Marble, Colorado.

The same geology that created the marble also created a host of problems in quarrying the stone. Quarrying in this high altitude environment with steep slopes, deep snow, and snow-mud slides is so expensive that advances in technology have not been able to overcome the challenges. These factors limit periods of operation and the amount of marble that can be brought down from the quarry. In the early years a lack of transportation to move enough of the stone out of Marble added to the difficulties. The transportation problem was largely mitigated by the advent of a railroad (1906 through 1941) and by road and truck since 1990. The cutting rates of late-1900s equipment were much faster than the 1911 technology.

Located along and above the east and west side of Yule Creek, from an elevation of 9,000 feet (2,700 m) to 9,500 feet (2,900 m) were five quarries, of which only one on the west side was in operation by 1996. Those on the west were the most productive being the John Osgood quarry (pit-type started in the early 1890s) and the present-day quarry started in 1905 by the Colorado-Yule Marble Company inside the mountain. The east side quarry, started in 1904 by the Strauss brothers, was quarried inside Whitehouse Mountain. Most marble quarries in the world by the late-20th century were pit-type operations, such as Carrara, Italy. The amount of Yule Marble remaining for quarrying in 1996 was expected to last for hundreds of years.

Use of Yule Marble has grown through several periods of boom and bust from local to national, and by the 1990s was international. The first major use was in the Colorado State Capitol building in 1895. Yule Marble quarried between 1907 and 1941 can be found in banks, mausoleums, libraries, schools, hotels, and government buildings from the west coast (Seattle south to Los Angeles) to the east coast, including the Equitable Building skyscraper in New York City. The dimension of the deposit enables large blocks to be quarried, which is why Yule Marble was selected for the Tomb of the Unknowns (Tomb of the Unknown Soldier) in Arlington National Cemetery. In 1931, the 56-ton (55.86 metric ton) block for the die section (on which six wreaths, three Greek figures, and the inscription were carved) was the largest single piece of marble ever quarried at that time. As of the 2010s, the marble is primarily shipped to Italy to supply fabricators throughout Europe. Blocks also go to Saudi Arabia, Peru, and other developing international markets. Finished marble is used for tile and slabs (walls, countertops, etc.).

As the marble industry was cyclical, the town's economy, being principally based on a single industry, also fluctuated. At the same time, had Marble not made the transition from its origins as a mining town to quarrying Yule Marble, the town would have died, as did other Colorado mining towns such as nearby Crystal and Schofield.

==== State rock ====
On 9 March 2004, Yule Marble became the official state rock of Colorado. The designation was the result of petitioning by Girl Scout Troop 357 of Lakewood, Colorado of the Colorado General Assembly, who in turn passed a bill that was signed by Governor Bill Owens (R).

== Discovered: 1873 to mid-1880s ==
Yule Marble was discovered in the Crystal River Valley in the spring of 1873 by geologist Sylvester Richardson. George Yule (Note: Yule was born 30 June 1835 in Grange Parish of Banffshire, Scotland. His parents were John Yule and Janet Thompson, and in 1896 he married Lizzie McBurney. He died 8 August 1910 in Gunnison County, Colorado. "Yule Marble". Yule Family website.) (for whom the marble was later named) was the prospector who "rediscovered" the marble in 1874. In the same year, an unknown person took some marble—from which polished samples were made—and appeared in Denver but failed to generate interest. The marble became lost again, and was rediscovered 10 years later, yet again by accident. By this time, prospectors were digging into Whitehouse Mountain for silver and gold when they encountered the Treasure Mountain Dome and thick marble. This time a transition started that moved the town away from mining to one of quarrying marble, although some locals were still involved with mining in 1910. The transition enabled the town to survive while nearby towns such as Crystal and Schofield became ghost towns. The town was still a one-industry economy, and its future followed that of the marble operation.

== First quarries come and go: 1884 to 1905 ==
The local miners never had sufficient capital to develop marble quarries and in the 1890s they began selling their marble claims:

- Colorado Marble and Mining was formed in 1891, by Steven Keene with capital stock of $1,000,000. In 1909 the lease was transferred to Monarch Marble, in 1921 to Colorado White Marble Company (by the Morman Church of Missouri) and out of business in 1926. Attempted to restart in 1937 but were unable to so.
- Crystal Land and Development was formed in 1892, by John C. Osgood and started quarrying the same year with an open-pit quarry on west side of Yule Creek. Osgood was also the president of Colorado Fuel and Iron, with major coal and coke operations in Redstone, Colorado, 12 miles (19 km) from the town of Marble. In the late 1890s, he formed Yule Creek White Marble Company, then reorganized in 1905 as Redstone Marble. The reorganization did not result in any quarrying and the company was out of business on 5 September 1917.
- Marble City Quarry Company was formed on 29 September 1893, by Dr. R.H. Kline. The marble deposit was sold to Channing Meek, 28 February 1905 and the company was dissolved.
- Crystal River Marble Company was formed on 12 April 1904, by the Strauss brothers. The quarry was on the east side of Yule Creek inside Treasure Mountain. In support of their operation they completed the Treasury Mountain Railway in August 1910. They had little marble production with no major contracts and were bankrupt in 1917.

Though better financed, the new companies had little success in spite of growing interest in Yule Marble generated by glowing test results from London (1887), the St Louis Exposition (1890) and the Chicago Exposition (1893). The companies had different degrees of development and success with the quarry of John Osgood obtaining a major contract in 1895 to supply 140,000 square feet (13,000 m^{2}) of marble for the new state capitol in Denver, Colorado. After this initial success, little production has accomplished by Osgood or the other two companies. The Osgood operation was well financed but even he was afflicted by the problems associated with developing and operating a quarry in the Yule Creek Valley. Also the lack of transportation to move enough of the stone out of Marble added to the difficulties. Taken together, these factors resulted in high operating costs that could not be covered by marble revenue. The high cost problems would also affect the next quarry and its operators up to 1996.

In 1905, another major transfer of leases took place with acquisitions by the newly formed Colorado-Yule Marble Company (CYMC). First was Channing Meek (Note: Meek, born in Iowa on 26 September 1865, was an industrialist in diverse activities from the Shredded Wheat Company to various railroads. As a child he had been a marble cutter. As president of Colorado Coal and Iron he merged with John C. Osgood's Colorado Fuel Company in 1893 to form Colorado Fuel and Iron. In April 1905 he became president of the Colorado-Yule Marble Company and was the driving force behind the operation. He died 14 August 1912 from injuries sustained when he jumped from a runaway tram coming down from the quarry. "Marble Colorado: City of Stone" and "Marble: A Town Build on Dreams") purchasing the marble deposits of the Marble City Quarry Company on 28 February 1905. He in turn sold the deposits to the newly formed CYMC on 11 April 1905 and subsequently became the CYMC president. The marble deposit that became the quarry of the CYMC was acquired on 14 November 1905 from Osgood. (Osgood never quarried the marble because of financial problems.) Because the three remaining quarries were not in production at the time, this left only the quarry started by the CYMC in 1905. (Note: Chart on right: "Marble Quarries Operators – Yule Creek Area, Marble, Colorado – 1884 to Present"; by Charles Moore, Museum Director, Marble Historical Society, Marble, Colorado: City of Stone, Vandenbusche, Duane and Myers, Rex; Golden Bell Press, Denver, Colorado; February 1996, 6th printing)

== Primary quarry: 1905 to today ==
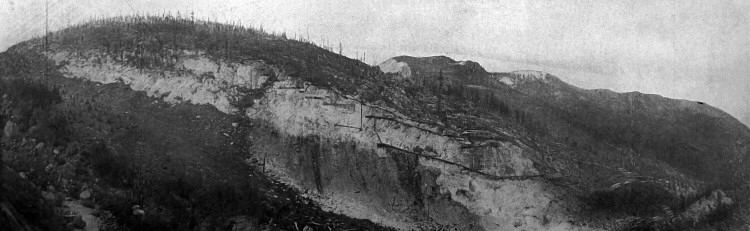
1907: Looking east at the CYMC quarry, west side of Yule Creek. Visible is the marble vein over one mile (1.6 km) wide with thickness of 169 feet (52 m)169 to 239 feet (73 m).

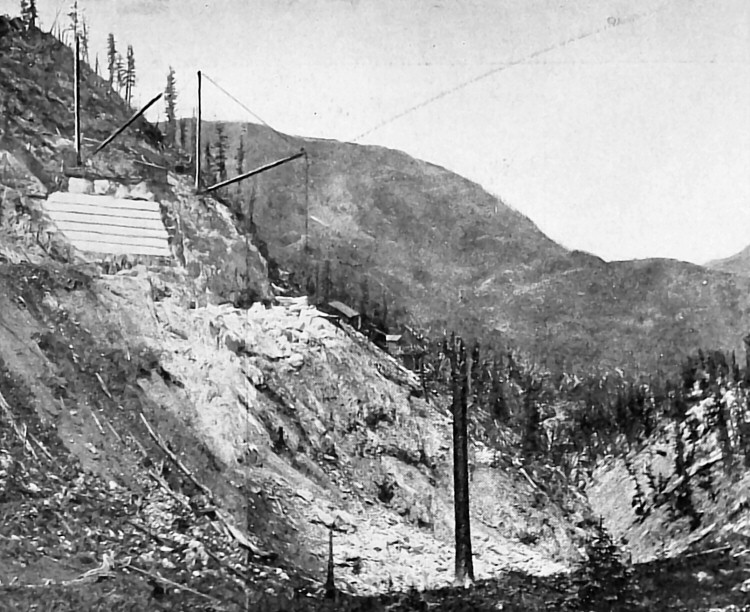
1906: Looking north through the Yule Creek Valley leading down to Marble (out of view) 1,300 feet (400 m) below. Left is Quarry 2 in the mountain side. Far right-below is Yule Creek at approx. 300 feet (91 m) below the bottom of Quarry 2.

When the Colorado-Yule Marble Company (CYMC) arrived in Marble in 1905 they developed the last Yule Marble quarry, which is still in production today. The operation showed the unrealized promise of the previous 20 years with a 10-year boom in which marble was shipped to the east and west coasts with contracts reaching one million dollars. The marble boom also resulted in one for the town of Marble. While the CYMC overcame some quarry problems of the previous 20 years, other difficulties ultimately led to their bankruptcy in April 1917. Subsequent operations from 1922 through 1941 were on a much smaller scale with several different operators and dramatic fluctuations in quarrying until the next bust at the end of 1941 After almost 50 years the quarry reopened in September 1990. The 1905 problems of transporting marble out of the town have been largely solved (by road and trucks) but the high costs of working in a mountain environment still exist today, and there have been several operator changes with the last one in 2010.

=== Integrated operation: 1905 to 1941 ===
The quarry was part of the integrated operation created by the CYMC during 1905 into 1907, and was retained by subsequent operators until the quarry shut down in 1941. Once marble was out of the quarry, it was lowered onto CYMC transport for movement down to Marble, a descent of 1,300 feet (400 m) over 3.9 miles (6.3 km) with grades up to 54% (17% starting in 1910). In Marble, the stone entered an enormous CYMC mill site and was transformed into a variety of finished objects. The site was 150 feet (46 m) feet at its widest point and almost 1,400 feet (430 m) long under one roof, totaling 108,000 square feet (10,000 m^{2}). (It was the largest operation of its kind in the world.) Finished marble was moved into railroad cars of the CYMC-built Crystal River & San Juan Railway (CR&SJ) for shipment throughout the country.

Building the CR&SJ solved a major problem of no viable transportation to move large quantities of the stone out of Marble. In November 1906, the CR&SJ completed a 6-mile (10 km) railway line from Marble to Placita, where it connected to the Crystal River Railway (CRR). (To support his coal and coke operations in the Redstone area, Osgood started building the CRR line in the late 1890s from Carbondale, Colorado southward reaching Redstone in June 1900. By the early 1900s, the line reached its final destination of Placita.) In 1910, the CR&SJ obtained a right-of-way to operate on the CRR line to Carbondale, 28 miles (45 km) from Marble. The railway also increased the efficiency of getting supplies to the operation from outside the Crystal River Valley. The town's residents benefited by the railroad for transportation with the depot on the grounds of the mill site. In later years, livestock was transported out of the Crystal River Valley by the railroad.

Development of the integrated operation also created a large debt that led directly to receivership in July 1916 and bankruptcy in April 1917. Although the spending created an operation using the best equipment and was technically efficient, the company was unable to repay the debt with marble revenue because of high operating costs. By 1913 CYMC was in financial trouble when a loan of $1,868,000 was approved early in 1913 and used to refinance the debt.

=== Configuration ===
==== Exterior ====
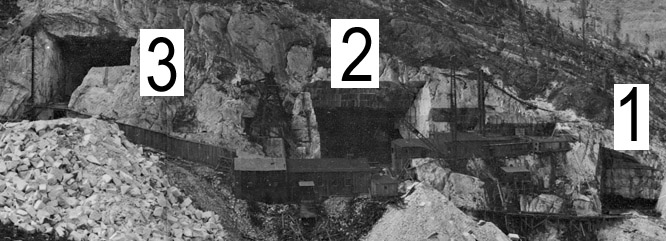
As of 1914: Quarries 1, 2 and 3 of the Colorado-Yule Marble Company. Quarry opening span is approximately 500 feet (150 m) from right side of #1 to left side of #3.

1905 development started the first of three quarry openings with #2 in 1905. When Quarry 2 cutting started, none of the workers wanted to hang off the edge of the cliff sitting on a wooden bench attached to an overhead derrick. So the company president, Channing Meek, came up to the quarry, sat on the wooden bench, was lowered over the mountainside, and started cutting marble. After that no worker refused to go over the side and cut marble. Quarry 2 was followed by #3 in 1907 and #1 in 1912. A fourth opening to the left of #3 (out of view) was started but did not become a producing quarry.

To operate the quarries, structures for various functions were built around the quarry exterior. Wooden derricks were located by and above the openings to lift blocks out of the quarries. The boiler house (providing steam power for quarrying equipment) was the last major addition (second building to the right of opening 2). In front of the boiler house is a 50-ton (49.875 metric ton) electric hoist and the hoist electric power house is to the right of the boiler house. Below the boiler house area near the bottom of the photo is the Pea Vine (winch-cable powered carts on rails) used to move marble from the quarry to the loading station several hundred feet away, where it was placed on wagons for transport to the mill site. There are other facilities to the right of opening 1; compressor house, machine shop, and bunk house. To provide the needed electricity, the company built a hydro-electric plant with the generators located just east of the town limits and completed in July 1907.

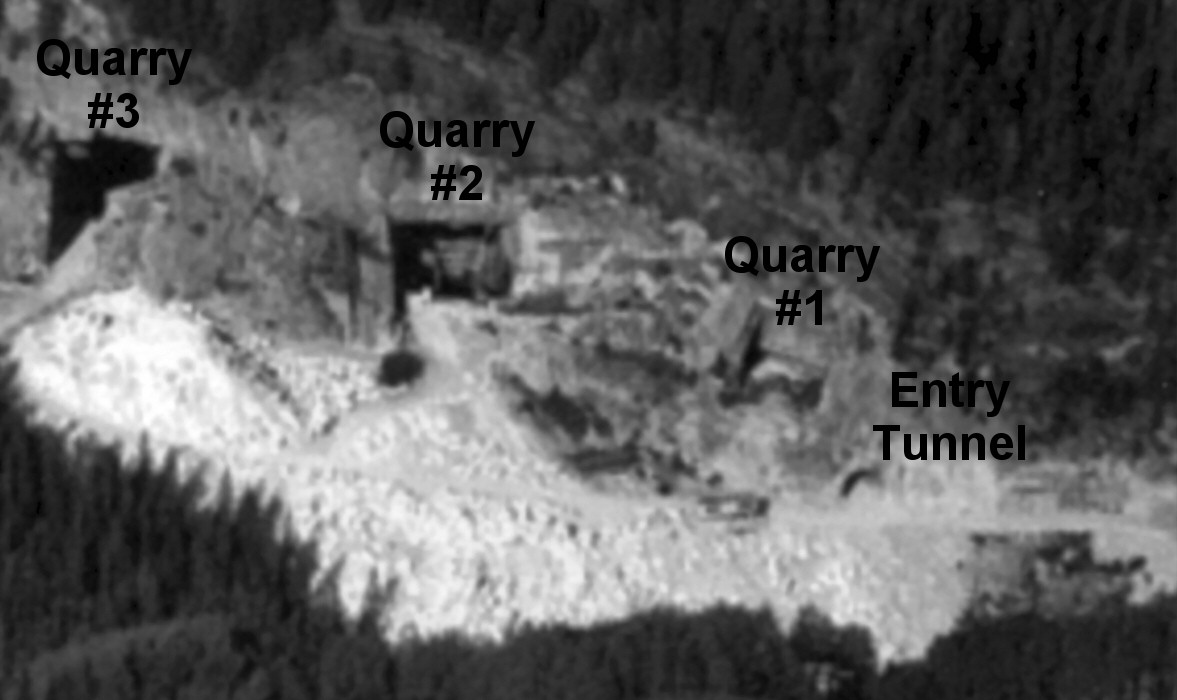
Present-day quarry exterior with the 1990 made entry tunnel on the right

By 1914 the quarry configuration had gone through several changes but from then on remained largely unchanged until the shut down in 1941. Several buildings located to the right of opening 1 had been relocated to opening 3, such as the machine shop (first building to the left of opening 2), offices (to the left of the machine shop), and the compressor house (first building on the right of opening 2 and left of the boiler house). The boarding house (not visible to the right of opening 1) was also relocated. In 1910, a new system was finished to get the stone from the quarry down to the finishing mill in the town of Marble. Two tall wooden derricks (one to the left opening 2 and another on the east side of Yule Creek) suspended an 880 feet (270 m) long cable. The 50-ton (49.875 metric ton) electric hoist attached a block to the cable for lowering marble 225 feet (69 m) to the new loading station and onto a railroad car (on standard gauge track) towed by the new electric tram finished in 1910. The electric tram replaced the Pea Vine. After closing in October 1941, the equipment inside was removed and the wood structures fell apart.

When the quarry reopened in 1990, the functions of the previous structures that were needed were located inside the quarry. The only structures remaining from prior to 1942 are the two cable derricks. One major 1990 alteration to the cliff was the blasting of a 16-by-16-foot (4.9 by 4.9 m) tunnel for access to the quarry interior. Today the marble is loaded onto a truck inside the mountain and driven out.

==== Interior ====
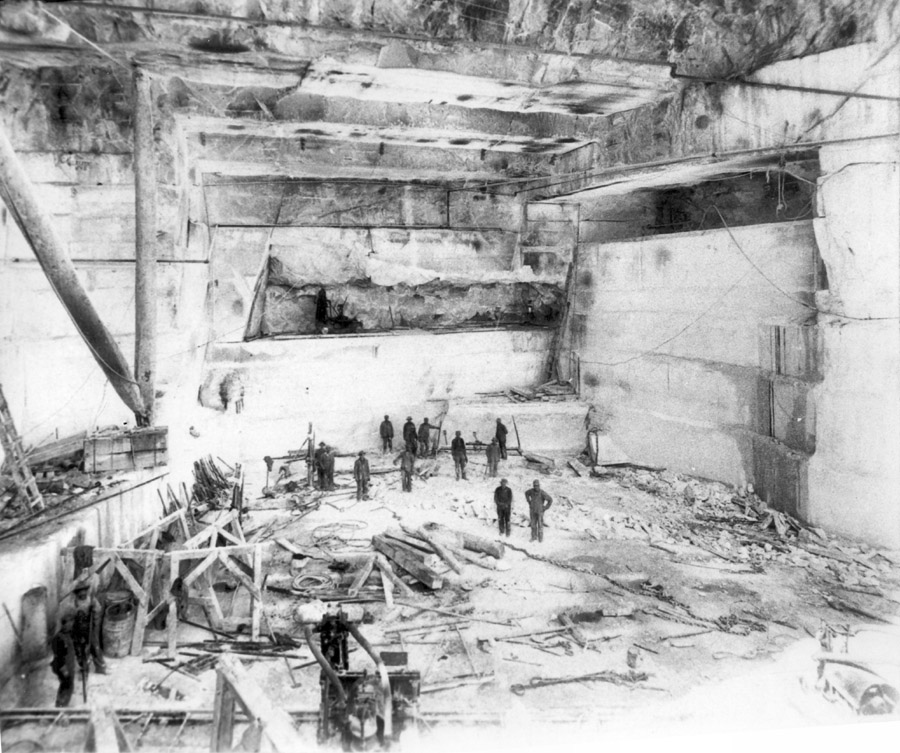
Between 1908 and 1916: Quarry interior walls showing marble blocks removed were 7 feet (2.1 m) tall.

Distance	Dimension	Area covered
750 feet (230 m)	Portal span	Right side of #1 to 250 feet (76 m) past the left side of #3
300 feet (91 m)	Down	Through #3 as of 1996, in 1931 – 125 feet (38 m)
225 feet (69 m)	Depth	Through #3 as of today

In the early years, the quarry was three separate caverns inside the marble formation. By 1914 a tunnel connected the three caverns. As the quarry went further down into the marble the three caverns eventually joined into one. The marble quarry is similar to coal mines and other underground mines in the need to constantly pump out water. With the marble dust created from the cutting, the floor is covered with marble mud. The interior temperature normally varies no more than 20 °F (11 °C) ranging from 20 to 40 °F (−7 to 4 °C), although temperatures have reached from −40 °F (−40 °C) to a high of 49 °F (9 °C).

=== Workers: 1908 to 1917 ===
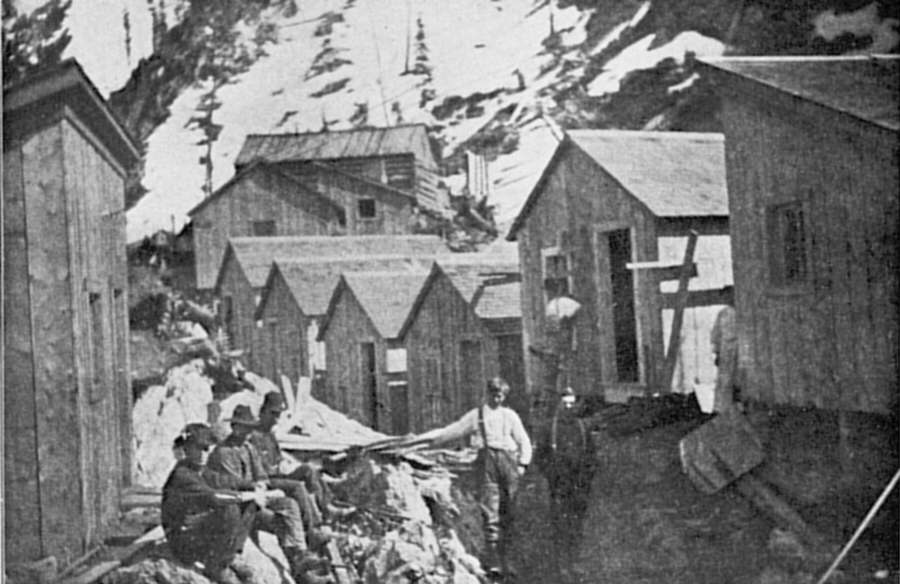
Quarry Town: looking south towards the quarry

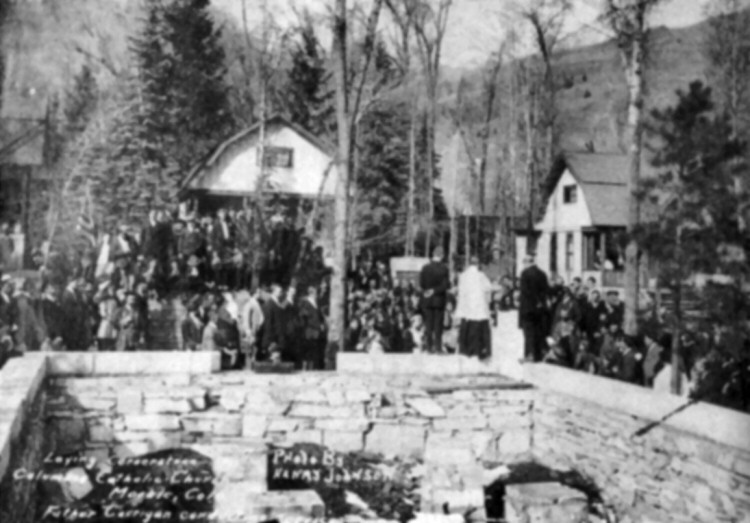
1912: foundation cornerstone ceremony for the Columbus Catholic Church

The number of people working in the quarry varied from 57 in 1910 to a maximum during the 1905–1917 boom of about 125. (By 2003, that number varied between 15 and 20.) The 1910 census showed that most quarry personnel were American born, although the mill site employed more Italian-born workers. The 1910 census recorded 57 quarry workers with 50 American born, 4 Italian, 2 German, and 1 Austrian. The marble mill employed 291 people of which 110 were American born and 120 born in Italy. As a side note, of the 481 town residents who were employed in 1910, 326 (66%) worked in the marble operation.

Residence location showed only a few of the workers lived in Marble; the 1910 census recorded 14 quarry employees there, and the rest lived in Quarry Town. Built by the CYMC, Quarry Town (Note: Not to be confused with the other Quarry Town – Lyons, Colorado, of the 1870s, named after the red sandstone or "Lyons Sandstone" from the Fountain Formation for building construction: "The Stone Industry in Quarry Town, Colorado" (PDF). Lyons-Colorado.com. Archived from the original (PDF) on 30 October 2011.) came into existence shortly after November 1908 as a settlement of bunkhouses and shacks just to the west and north of Quarry 1. It was built to alleviate a housing shortage caused by hiring more workers for the first large CYMC contract, the Cuyahoga County Court House, in Cleveland, Ohio. Though intended for single men, the 1910 census recorded 66 residents of which 44 were men, 9 were women, and 13 were children. In the winter time, Quarry Town folk would ski down to Marble then return by holding onto an electric tram going up to the quarry (an early Colorado ski lift). Quarry Town was abandoned after the quarry closed in 1941 and only a few scraps remain located behind the quarry fence.

Bootlegging started when Marble went dry after alcohol prohibition was passed by the voters on 3 December 1908. Prohibition was backed by the company because drunkenness was affecting the operation. Prohibition left workers in Quarry Town and folks in Marble without a close liquor supply (the town of Redstone was 12 miles (19 km) away). For those purchasing liquor from a bootlegger there were no legal worries for the law only made it illegal to sell or give away liquor; it was not illegal to purchase alcohol.

Wages became a source of conflict during this period. In 1909, daily wages ranged from $5 to $8 but no overtime pay was provided. During the 1930s Great Depression, they earned 40 cents an hour. A strike lasting three months started at the mill on 4 August 1909, and by the next day quarry workers started to join. The strikers were demanding an 8-hour day, time-and-a-half for overtime, and double time on Sunday. The company management quickly won the support of the public. By September, only 20 men were working at the mill and even fewer at the quarry. The strike lasted until 2 November with the workers going back to work at reduced wages. Full operations were resumed within a week.

The civic-mindedness of the workers and the company was demonstrated through their donations to build the all-marble Columbus Catholic Church in Marble (on Park Street, between West 3rd Street and West 2nd Street). The company was donating the marble and the workers their time to quarry and cut it and build the church. The foundation was laid and a cornerstone ceremony was held in 1912. However, the quarrying stopped in August 1912 when company president Channing Meek died of injuries received from an electric tram accident on the quarry road and his successor did not want to continue the marble donation. In the 1990s, much of the foundation was still present as was the cabin across the street to the right.

=== Quarrying methods ===
==== 1905 to 1916 ====
Quarring techniques had changed since the miners initial quarrying of the mid-1880s with blasting being replaced with equipment to drill and cut. The miners were familiar with explosives plus they did not have the capital for machinery. The machinery reduced waste because blasting damaged a lot of the surrounding marble.

Cutting a block involved a channeling machine (consisting of several drill bits and powered by electricity or steam) that made vertical holes from the top down. Next the bottom was cut by drilling horizontal holes. The block was then freed from the mountainside by inserting wedges into the horizontal holes, then inserting feathers until the block broke free. Sometimes in winter, water was poured into the holes so the expansion of the freezing water would break the block loose. Sometimes a wire saw would cut the quarried block inside the quarry into individual blocks before it was lifted out.

Lifting out of the quarry required a hole to be made through the block so a cable could be inserted to pull the block away so other cables could be attached for lifting out of the quarry. The lifting was done with wooden derricks above and outside of the quarry or the 50-ton electric hoist if in Quarry 2 (which was Quarry 3 during the boom period of 1905 to 1916).

Once out of the quarry, a block was moved to a loading station for transport to the mill site. The first method (1906 through 1909) used the 50-ton electric hoist, which lowered the block down and onto a Pea Vine cable-powered cart. The cart then moved on rails with downgrades to 54% to a loading station where the block was transferred to a wagon for towing to the mill site. The wagons were first towed by teams of four horses then in 1908 by a 110-horsepower steam tractor previously used for logging. The road to the mill site was built in the 1890s by John Osgood to his quarry, which was just below the CYMC started quarry. By 1910, the method changed with the 50-ton hoist attaching a block to an overhead cable for lowering 225 feet (69 m) to a new loading station. Here the block was placed on a flatcar for towing by an electric tram (designed by General Electric) on standard-gauge railroad track to the town of Marble and into the mill site. Electricity to power the tram came from the CYMC-built hydro-electric plant located just east of the town.

Reaching the mill site, the marble went into an expansive finishing mill built by CYMC from 1907 through 1910. At its widest point the mill site was 150 feet (46 m) and almost 1,400 feet (430 m) long totaling 108,000 square feet (10,000 m^{2}) (the largest finishing mill in the world under one roof). Here the marble was transformed into a variety of objects for shipment throughout the country.

Shipment of the finished marble was done by the Crystal River and San Juan Railway (created by CYMC and completed November 1906). Railroad tracks were parallel with the mill site and the marble was rolled on a cart out a mill site building and into the railroad car. In some shops the railroad cars were brought into the shop for loading. The company railroad then transported the marble 28 miles (45 km) north to Carbondale, Colorado, where the cars were connected to other railway trains.

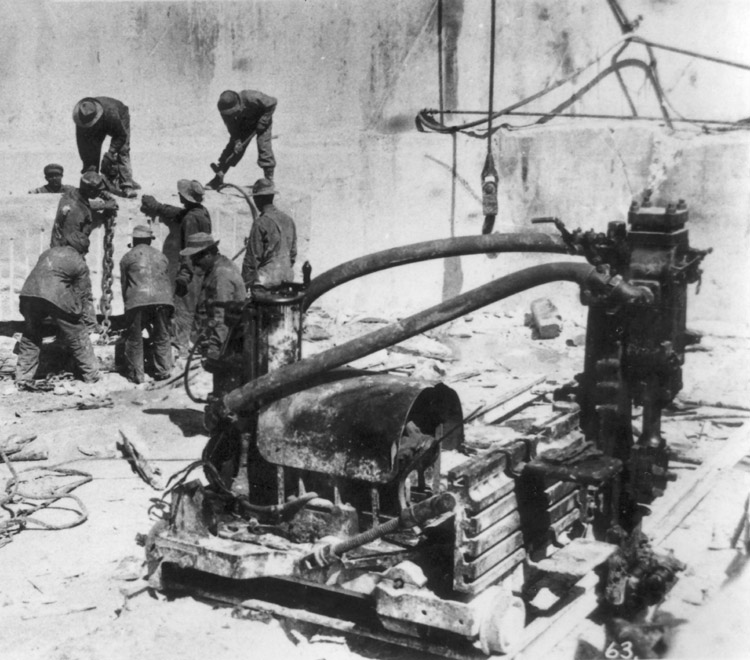
Channeling machine (a series of drills) for making vertical holes in marble. Background-block being rigged for lifting out of the quarry.

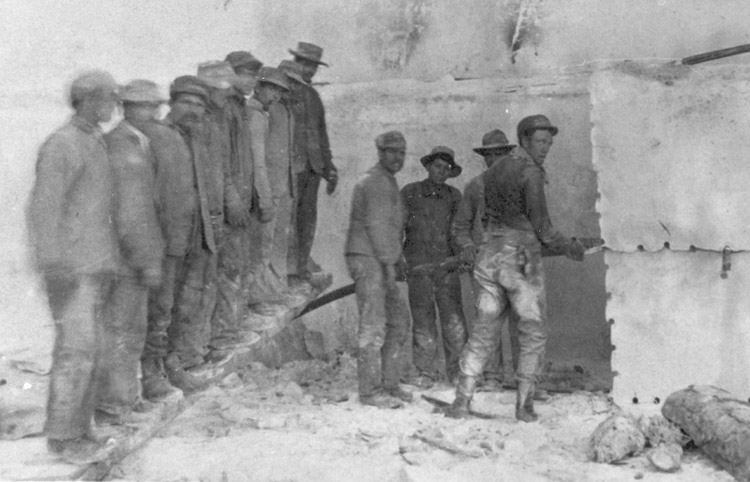
Marble block being broken loose from the mountain with leverage. Holes have been drilled and feathers-wedges inserted into the holes.

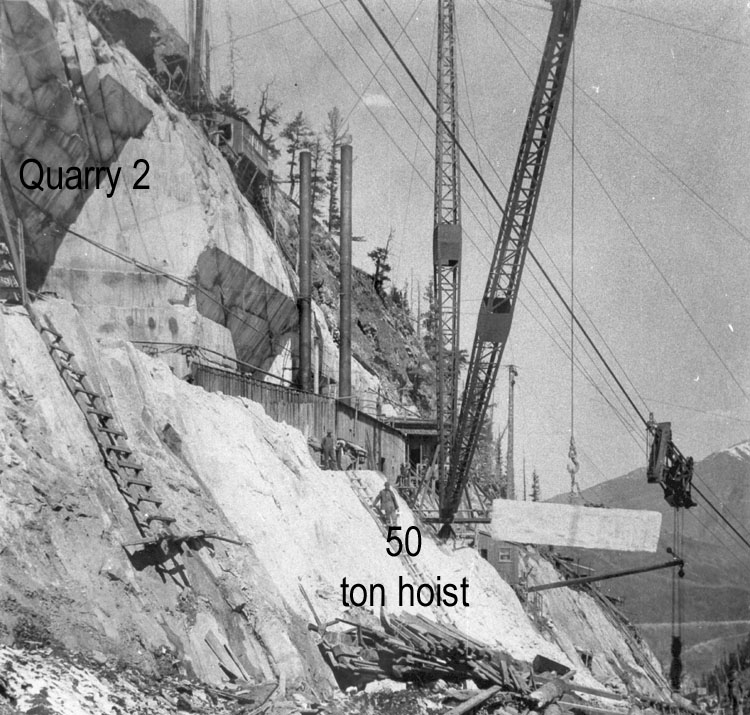
The marble block hanging from the 50-ton electric hoist will be transferred to the carrier (right).

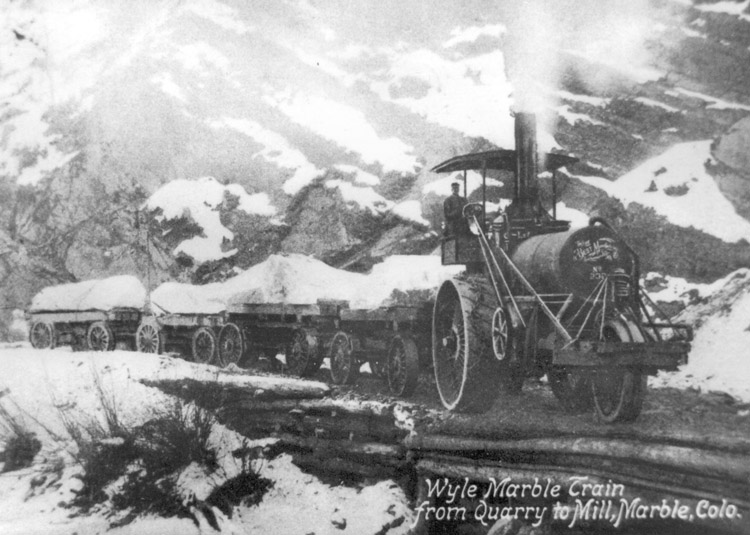
110-horsepower steam tractor bringing marble to the mill site (on the right side of the bridge over the Crystal River). Rear tractor wheels are 8 feet tall.

==== 21st century ====
Methods for cutting a block can vary depending on the formation and other factors, but usually involve three types of saws (wire and two chain types of which all three are diamond edged). The usual approach starts with a horizontal cut at the bottom after which metal rollers are inserted (on which to move the block away from the mountain after all sides have been cut). Next is the back cut with a wire saw followed by chain saws to cut the vertical sides. A metal bag is then inserted behind the back cut and filled with water, which pushes the block away from the rock face (on the metal rollers). The block is then rigged for lifting by forklift and placed on a haul truck and driven out of the mountain and down to the staging area on the grounds of the old mill site. When the quarry opened in 1990, a 16-by-16-foot (4.9 by 4.9 m) tunnel had been blasted through the mountain and into the quarry interior to enable marble to be driven out of the quarry.

The cutting rates of 2000 were many factors greater than in 1911 when a wire saw was sometimes used before a block was removed. In 1911, such a saw was new technology and had a cut rate of about 2 inches (51 mm) an hour. A modern wire or chain saw can cut more than 50 inches (1,300 mm) in the same time.

=== Operations ===
==== Boom: 1905 to 1916 ====
By July 1907 the initial construction of the quarry and the rest of the system was finished but marble was being shipped out before though only in small amounts and advertising pieces. The first major contract came in late October 1907 to supply $500,000 worth of marble for the Cuyahoga County Court House, in Cleveland, Ohio, and set off a quarrying boom. In spite of the increased quarrying, by 1913 the company was in financial trouble due to the huge start-up debt and high operating costs not generating enough revenue to pay down the debt. A loan of $1,868,000 was obtained in early February 1913 and used to refinance to debt. In spite of the financial difficulty orders kept coming in with the first contract of one million dollars for the Equitable Building, New York City, in August 1913 for 1,200,000 square feet (110,000 m^{2}) of marble.

As the quarry boomed, so did the town reaching its population peak from 1912 through 1914 of 1,400 to 1,500 residents, including a large number of skilled Italian marble worker immigrants with most of them in the mill site. There were two newspapers, three hotels, movie theater, ice cream parlor, five ice houses, and nine stables among other businesses. In January 1910, a movie was premiered in Marble, Bear Hunt in the Rockies by Edwin Stanton Porter, director of the 1903 landmark movie The Great Train Robbery.

===== Lincoln Memorial: March 1914 to June 1916 =====
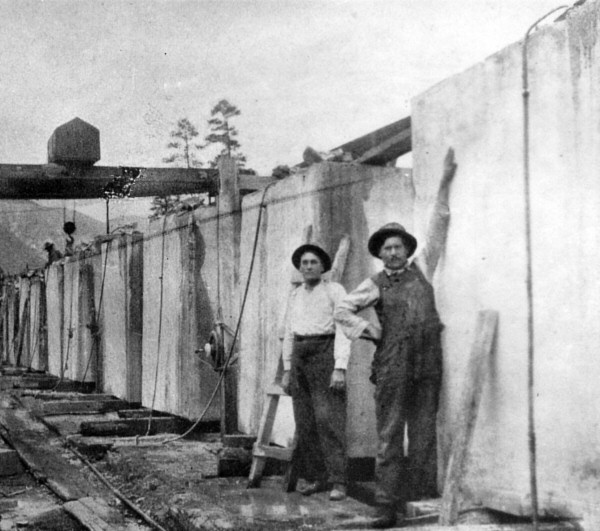
April 1914 – June 1916:marble blocks for Lincoln Memorial column sections (aka drums) at 8.333 feet (2.540 m) x 8.333 feet (2.540 m) x 4.5 feet (1.4 m) weighing 26.25 tons (26.18 metric tons) each. The man on the left is Henry Johnson, the photographer for the Colorado-Yule Marble Company.

Selecting the marble for the exterior was a competitive process with five samples submitted to the Lincoln Memorial Commission for consideration; three from Georgia (Cherokee, Southern and Amicalola), one from Vermont (Dorset White) and Yule marble. Of the samples, Memorial architect Henry Bacon wanted to use Yule marble in spite of its higher cost because the stones "whiteness and delicate veining" placed it "above any white building marble in appearance that I have seen here or abroad". The Memorial commission voted to award the marble contract for Yule marble on 26 September 1913 but the matter was not settled. Other bidders raised objections about Yule quality, ability to quarry the needed quantity and its durability. Colonel W. W. Harts, the US Army Engineer Officer in charge of Public Grounds and overseer of the project, commissioned geologist George Perkins Merrill to make a determination. After visiting the quarry, Merrill concluded Yule marble met the needed requirements. Yet Secretary of War Lindsley Garrison called for testing by Bureau of Standards which gave a positive report on the use of Yule marble. He also sent a 17 January 1914 letter to United States Commission of Fine Arts about the use of Yule marble, and a reply was sent five days later that compared to the other marbles submitted for consideration Yule "fit pre-eminently for a structure of the character of the Lincoln Memorial". The contract for Yule marble was awarded 14 March 1914.

The contract was the most expensive and most demanding in the history of Yule marble at $1,080,000. The marble came out of Quarry 3, with the first shipment leaving Marble on 25 May 1914 and the final on 16 June 1916. The high standards resulted in a high rejection rate, yet the contract was completed 5 months ahead of schedule. Only a small amount of the marble quarried ever reached the finishing mill. The amount of rejection is based on summary statements given by the company president J.F. Manning. In June 1914, Manning estimated that a monthly quarrying of 80,000 square feet (7,400 m^{2}) would yield 12,000 square feet (1,100 m^{2}) to 15,000 square feet (1,400 m^{2}) of acceptable marble. In 1915, Manning stated sometimes less than 10% of the quarried marble was shipped to the Memorial site. Once delivered to the mill site, marble blocks for other than the columns were taken to Shop 3 after being sawed into multiple pieces with a wire saw and the gang saws in one of the two mills. The wire saw and 20 of the 30 gangs saws were cutting nothing but Memorial marble 24 hours a day in May 1914. Marble for the 38 columns was offloaded in front of Shop 4. Each column comprised 11 drums and the top piece, with each of the 418 marble drums taking more than 18 hours to fashion.

==== Bust: 1916 to 1921 ====
The bust came barely one month after the final June 1916 shipment of marble for the Lincoln Memorial when the company went into receivership on 18 July 1916 and ceased operations 15 April 1917. The bust was caused by many factors such as the loss of skilled foreign-born craftsmen who returned to their native country to fight in World War I and a decline in the demand for marble brought about by the war. But the main cause was the huge debt incurred with the development of the integrated operation during 1905–1907. Even though the quarry had received a lot of contracts and some very lucrative, the operation (quarry, mill site and railroad) never made enough profit to pay off the start-up funding. A final disposition of the quarry was not completed until 4 April 1921 due to various groups vying for the assets.

The town declined rapidly to a population of 50 people in 1920 according to the 1920 census. The bank closed in 1918 as did the remaining newspaper. The last train left Marble in 1918.

==== Revival: 1922 to 1941 ====
Out of bankruptcy in April 1921, the operation was on a much smaller scale than before the 1917 bust. The amount quarried was greatly reduced and experienced several fluctuations in output and changes in operators. The fortunes of the town also went up and down with the marble fluctuation as reflected by the changes in population by climbing to 600 by 1926, 550 as 1930, then dropping to 175 by 1933 with a rise to 225 from 1939 and into 1941.

Though the quarry was out of bankruptcy in April 1921, quarrying did not resume until April 1922 and with divided ownership. The bankruptcy settlement resulted in the Carrara Company owning the quarry and the tram line to the mill site while Yule Marble of Colorado owned the mill site and the railroad. Both companies realized the need to cooperate and functioned as an integrated operation and later merged into Consolidated Yule Marble Company, 24 April 1924. There were other changes of owner and operators with the Vermont Marble Company, taking over as of November 1928. They in turn formed Yule Colorado Company on 14 December 1928 which continued up to the shut down at the end of 1941.

===== Tomb of the Unknowns: 1930 to December 1931 =====
Marble for the Tomb of the Unknowns was quarried in seven pieces for four layers; cap, die, base and sub-base (plinth) from Quarry 3 at 125 feet (38 m) below the opening from early in 1930 to January 1931. The cap was quarried on the first try while the base required three attempts. (No data available as to quarrying the plinth). The die was worked by 75 men for one year and three attempts until a 56-ton (55.86 metric) block came out of the quarry in late January 1931. When the block was cut from the mountain it weighed 124 tons (123.69 metric). A wire saw was then brought in to cut the block down to 56 tons (55.68 metric). Because of the weight, Vermont Marble Company sent to the quarry a special derrick that was reinforced and heavily rigged. The initial lift was just enough to clear the quarry floor so the block could hang for 15 minutes while the hoist was inspected for stress. Once out of the quarry, the trip to down to Marble took four days with the die block arriving on the grounds of the mill site on 3 February 1931. On 8 February, the block was shipped to Vermont for cutting to final dimensions and carving the pilasters and bas-relief. The work was completed in September and arrived at Arlington National Cemetery the same month. Assembly started in September but after the base piece was put in place, imperfections were discovered halting the work until a replacement was received. Three attempts were made before an acceptable piece was quarried. In December, the replacement base arrived and the assembly was completed 31 December 1931. This was followed by the carving work on the die block by the Piccirilli Brothers (who also carved the statue of Lincoln for the Lincoln Memorial) under the supervision of Tomb sculptor William Hudson Jones. When the Tomb assembly was completed 9 April 1932, the structure had the following dimensions.

Level	Length	Width	Height	Cubic area	Tons
Cap	12'-5.4" (3.794 m)	6'-6.7" (1.998 m)	1'-3.3" (0.388 m)	100.69 cubic feet (2.851 m^{3})	8.56 (8.538 metric)
Die (quarried)	14'-0" (4.267 m)	7'-4.8" (2.255 m)	6"-0" (1.828 m)	621.6 cubic feet (17.60 m^{3})	56 (55.86 metric) -a
Die (finished)	12'-3.0" (3.733 m)	6'-6.4" (1.991 m)	5'-2.1" (1.577 m)	385.43 cubic feet (10.914 m^{3})	32.76 (32.678 metric)
Base	13'-10.0" (4.216 m)	7'-11.9" (2.435 m)	1'-11.1" (0.586 m)	198.64 cubic feet (5.625 m^{3})	16.88 (16.837 metric)
Sub-Base	14'-10.4" (4.531 m)	9'-0.2" (2.748 m)	1'-10.9" (0.581 m)	255.81 cubic feet (7.244 m^{3})	21.74 (21.685 metric)

one metric ton is 5 pounds more than one standard ton
a; 52.84 tons (52.708 metric) is the calculated weight from the three dimensions while 56 tons is the cited amount.

==== Bust: 1941 to 1988 ====
Although there was some increased activity in the late 1930s, World War II ostensibly ended it. In 1942 the mill site was taken apart and the railroad tracks removed. A hoped for renewed marble demand did not happen after World War II ended. The quarry sat idle and the interior filled with water.

The town also declined but had some revival. The marble shutdown and a 1941 flood led to a population decline to about 30 people and the post office closing in 1943. After the war ended and a 1945 flood, more people moved out leaving only Theresa Herman (the school teacher). The population did revive with 26 registered voters in 1956 increasing to a 2011 year-round population of about 110.

==== Revival: 1988 to present ====
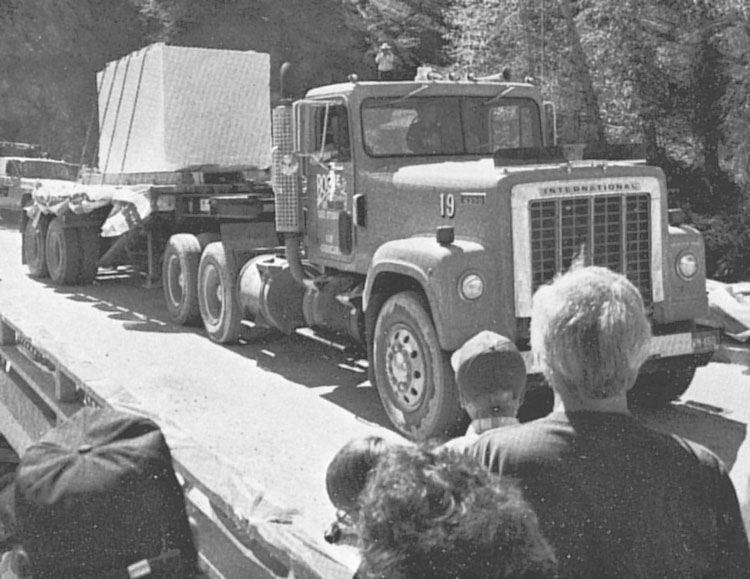
First marble block quarried since 1941 coming into Marble crossing the bridge over the Crystal River (15 September 1990)

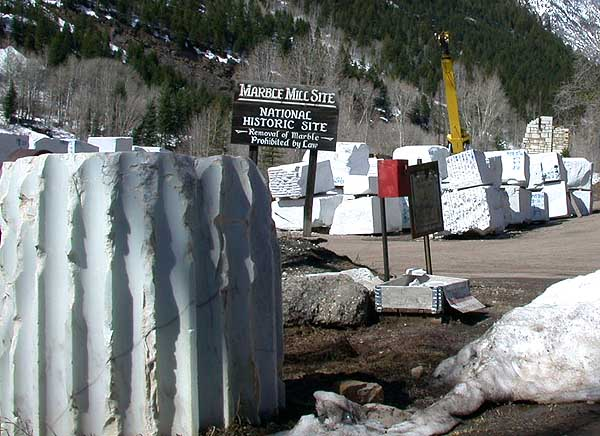
As of 2005: Background – inventory blocks of Yule Marble on the grounds of the former mill site. Foreground – fluted column section carved in the mill site prior to 1942.

In 1988, Denver oilman Stacy Dunn and another associate undertook the reopening of the quarry forming the new Colorado-Yule Marble Company. Mr Dunn though was killed in a car accident before the opening. Getting the quarry to operating condition required pumping out millions of gallons of water among other repairs. On 15 September 1990, the first marble block to come out of the quarry since 1941 arrived in Marble. Riding in the truck was Elmer Bair, the 1931 motorman of the lead electric tram that brought down the body block for the Tomb of the Unknown Soldier in February 1931. But as with the original Colorado-Yule Marble Company 80 years before, the new company went bankrupt in 1997. Since that time there have been several changes of operator.

From	To	Operator
1997	1999	Bath Stoneworks (of England)
1999	2004	Rex Loesby (Sierra Minerals), who was involved in the formation of Colorado Yule Marble Company, but had pulled out
2004	Present	Colorado Stone Quarries Inc. (United States)

Since 1988 Marble Colorado has been the site of annual Sculpting Symposia. These symposia are attended by professional and amateur sculptors from the US and foreign countries. These symposia utilize the marble from this mountain.

By 2012, only a few people of the 110 or so full-time Marble residents made up the 15–20 quarry employees. The town received a monthly rent from the quarry company to use part of the old mill site grounds (West 3rd Street and the Crystal River) to store quarried blocks until they are shipped to customers.

== Replace vs. repair: Tomb of the Unknowns ==
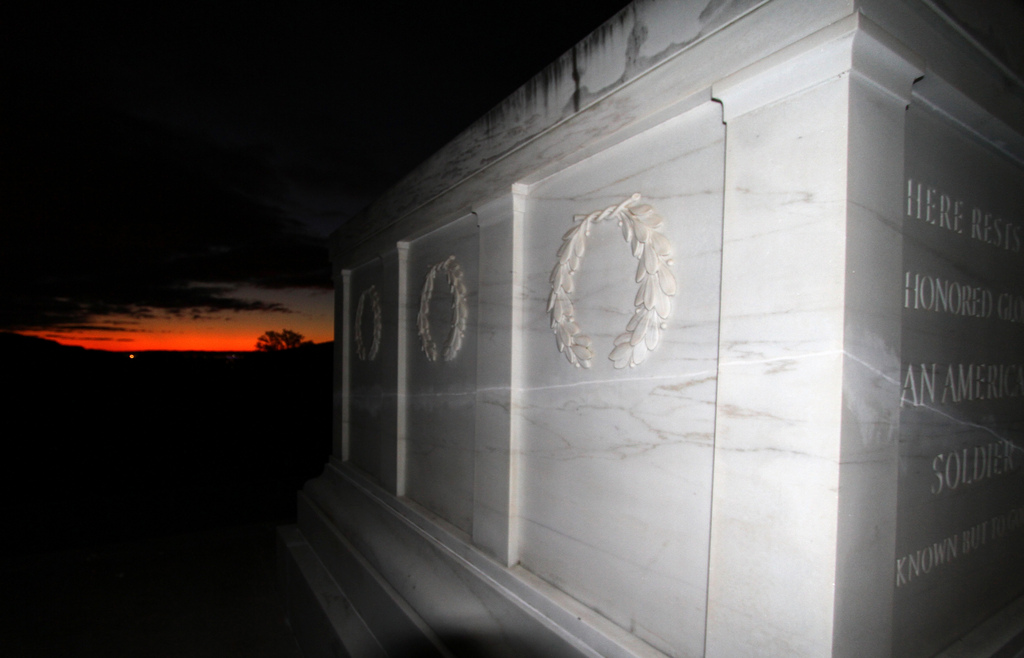
21 October 2011: inspection day of the September 2011 completed repairs of the cracks in the Tomb

Shortly after assembly of the Tomb was completed on 9 April 1932, cracks developed in the main block (wreaths, Greek figures and the inscription) and grew longer over time. The cracks were filled in 1974 and 1989. By 1990, the Arlington National Cemetery (ANC) was studying options, including replacing the damaged block. ANC prepared a 15 August 2006 draft memorandum of agreement to replace the damaged marble.

While ANC was studying the situation, a donated replacement block was provided by George Haines, a retired entrepreneur and car dealer in Glenwood Springs, Colorado. In September 2002, he read that the quarry crew "was getting ready to look for and replace the tomb's marble and that the (Veterans Administration) and Arlington were accepting bids on the replacement piece." With that he decided to pay the $31,000 for the replacement block. Arlington National Cemetery Superintendent John Metzler requested a letter on the donation and was sent one. Mr Haines also arranged for free transportation to Arlington National Cemetery. In 2003 a prospective block was found and quarrying began. To record the activity, Ron Bailey photographed the event. When the block came free from the mountain, imperfections were found so the block was rejected. The heart of the block was used for a statue of President George H. W. Bush. Another search started with a flawless block quarried and brought down to the storage area in Marble in 2005. Since 2005, the block has remained on the same yellow flatbed trailer in the north-west corner of the storage yard due to replacement opposition. (Note: See, Tomb of the Unknowns repair controversy and Damage and repair to the Tomb Monument.)

Opposition to replacing the block had been growing and included such groups as the National Trust for Historic Preservation. On 26 September 2007, the Senate passed the Akaka-Webb amendment to prohibit replacing the cracked Tomb marble. On 26 June 2009, the Army and ANC announced the Tomb would be repaired. The repairs of April 2010 failed after two months and were redone in September 2011. A 21 October 2011 inspection by the Army Corps of Engineers and other experts pronounced the repairs successful.

== Quarry access ==
Because it is a working mine, casual visitors are not permitted. Marble pieces are available for purchase, however.

== Structures with Yule marble ==
A partial list of structures containing Yule marble, 1905 to 1941, from the quarry started by the Colorado-Yule Marble Company. The Colorado state capitol was an 1895 contract with the quarry of John Osgood. The dollar amount after a building name is the amount of marble. Marble ranged from a single item (such as the baptism font now in the Episcopal church in Glenwood Springs, Colorado) to entire exteriors.

State	Location	Structure	Image	Year	Notes
Arizona	Kingman	Mohave County Court House			
Arizona	Phoenix	Adam's Hotel			Cost of marble: $2,500
Arkansas	Hot Springs	Rammelsburg Bathhouse			Cost of marble: $9,500
Arkansas	Little Rock	Arkansas State Capitol Building			
California	Los Angeles	Los Angeles Athletic Club			Cost of marble: $4,800
California		Bankers Trust Building			Cost of marble: $200,000
California		Builder Home Association Building			
California		Citizen's National Bank			
California		Los Angeles County Fair			
California		Herald Examiner Building			
California		Fidelity Building			
California		Goodfellow Office Building			
California		Hellman National Bank			Cost of marble: $6,000
California		Merchants Fireproof Building			
California		Merchants National Bank			
California		Merritt Building			Cost of marble: $50,000
California		Pan-American Building			
California		Judson D. River residence (fireplace mantel)			
California		Trinity Auditorium			
California	Oakland	Tribune Tower			
California	Pasadena	Forest Lawn Chapel & Crematory			Cost of marble: $10,000
California		Huntington Memorial Hospital			
California		Pasadena Post Office			Cost of marble: $25,000
California		Federal Building			
California	San Francisco	American Marble & Title Co			
California		City Hall			
California		Irvine Sarcophagus			
California		Municipal Building			
California		Saint Francis Hotel			
California		Sub-Treasury Building			Cost of marble: $21,000
California		Trinity Natatorium			
California	San Simeon	Hearst Mansion			
California	Statewide	40 School Buildings			
Colorado	Denver	Barth Mausoleum			
Colorado		Broadway Bank			
Colorado	Denver	Capitol Life Insurance Building			
Colorado	Denver	Cheesman Memorial			
Colorado	Denver	City and County Building			
Colorado		Colorado National Bank			Cost of marble: $85,000
Colorado	Denver	Colorado State Capitol Building			Marble from Osgood Quarry
Colorado	Denver	Colorado State Museum			Cost of marble: $118,200
Colorado	Denver	Daniels & Fisher Tower			
Colorado	Denver	Denver Gas & Electric			
Colorado	Denver	Denver Post Office			Cost of marble: $533,000
Colorado		Empire Building			
Colorado	Denver	Federal Reserve Bank			
Colorado	Denver	Fitzsimmons Army Hospital			
Colorado	Denver	Foster Building			Cost of marble: $20,000
Colorado	Denver	Hamilton National Bank			Cost of marble: $20,000
Colorado	Denver	Immaculate Conception Cathedral			
Colorado	Denver	Metropolitan Building			
Colorado	Denver	New Customs House			
Colorado		Old Customs House			
Colorado		Pioneer Building			
Colorado		Saint James Hotel			
Colorado		Shubert Theater (aka Denham Theater)			Cost of marble: $22,000
Colorado	Denver	Symes Building			
Colorado		Thatcher Memorial Vault			
Colorado	Denver	Union Station			Cost of marble: $10,000
Colorado	Glenwood Springs	Citizens National Bank			Cost of marble: $899
Colorado		Federal Building (floors)			
Colorado		Taylor Mausoleum			
Colorado	Greeley	Post Office			
Colorado	Gunnison	Post Office			
Colorado	La Junta	Santa Fe Office Building			Cost of marble: $3,550
Colorado	Marble	High School			
Colorado	Glenwood Springs	Baptismal font, St Paul's Church			Now installed at St. Barnabas Episcopal Church, Glenwood Springs, Colorado
Colorado		Mantel & overmantel, St Paul's Clubhouse for Boys			
Colorado	Pueblo	Vail Hotel			Cost of marble: $2,182
District of Columbia		Barnes Hospital			Cost of marble: $15,000
District of Columbia		W. Seely Hutchinson			Cost of marble: $1,619
District of Columbia		Lincoln Memorial			Cost of marble: $1,080,000
District of Columbia		Real Estate Trust Building			Cost of marble: $5,540
District of Columbia		Colorado Memorial Stone, Washington Monument			
Idaho	Pocatello	Post Office and Courthouse		1911	
Illinois	Chicago	Field Building			
Illinois		Otis Building			
Illinois		Rosehill Mausoleum			Cost of marble: $50,000
Illinois		Telephone Building			Cost of marble: $76,000
Indiana	Crawford	Davis Mausoleum			
Indiana	Evansville	First National Bank			
Indiana	Morocco	Mausoleum			Cost of marble: $8,000
Indiana	South Bend	Studebaker Building			
Iowa	Davenport	Davenport Hotel			Cost of marble: $30,000
Iowa	Smithland	Rice Tomb			Cost of marble: $10,000 (120,000 lbs.)
Kansas	Independence	Court House Post Office			Cost of marble: $3,000
Kansas	Wichita	Public Library			Cost of marble: $2,000
Kansas	Winfield	Mausoleum			
Kentucky	Paducah	Mausoleum			Cost of marble: $7,000
Louisiana	Shreveport	Commercial National Bank			Cost of marble: $12,500
Massachusetts	Cambridge	Widener Library, Harvard University			
Michigan	Detroit	Office Building – 43 story			
Minnesota	Minneapolis	McKnight Building			Cost of marble: $18,582
Missouri	Independence	Auditorium – Community of Christ aka Reorganized Church of Jesus Christ of Latter Day Saints (RLDS)			
Missouri	Kansas City	Chambers Office Building			Cost of marble: $10,000
Missouri		Community Mausoleum			
Missouri		Rialto Building			Cost of marble: $28,000
Missouri	Saint Louis	German-American Institute			
Missouri		German Savings Bank			
Missouri		Monward Realty Building			Cost of marble: $30,000
Montana	Billings	Montana Power House			
Montana	Helena	Montana State Capitol			
Montana	Great Falls	Rainbow Hotel			
Montana		United Savings and Trust			
Nebraska	Broken Bow	I.O.O.F. Building			
Nebraska	Columbus	Evans Hotel			Cost of marble: $10,000 (Note: A brief account of the Evans Hotel can be found in Margaret Curry, The History of Platte County, Nebraska, p. 554. A recent photograph can be seen at Wikimedia Commons.)
Nebraska	Greeley	Greeley County Court House (Note: Photos of the exterior of the courthouse can be seen at Category:Greeley County Courthouse (Nebraska). However, all marble work is on the interior of the building. The National Register of Historic Places nomination form for the courthouse discusses the use of marble, but does not state its provenance. See: "Greeley County Courthouse form" (PDF). National Register of Historic Places. Archived from the original on 16 June 2010.)			
Nebraska	Hastings	Masonic Temple			Cost of marble: $1,125
Nebraska	Lincoln	Bencroft Ward School; University of Nebraska at Lincoln			
Nebraska		Chaplin Building			
Nebraska		Lincoln High School			Cost of marble: $23,500
Nebraska	Omaha	Brandeis Subway Building			
Nebraska		Douglas County Court House			Cost of marble: $111,000
Nebraska		Fontenelle Hotel			
Nebraska		Forest Lawn Chapel & Crematorium			
Nebraska		Union Pacific Building			Cost of marble: $25,000
Nebraska		West Lawn Mausoleum			Cost of marble: $104,000
Nebraska		Woodmen of the World Building			Cost of marble: $64,000
Nebraska	Saint Paul	Howard County Court House			Cost of marble: $10,000
Nebraska	Sidney	First National Exchange Bank			
New York	New York City	Cambridge Building			
New York		Equitable Life Building			
New York		Metropolitan Museum of Art			
New York		Municipal Building			
New York	Syracuse	Third National Bank of Syracuse			
New York	Schenectady	Cross and seal design			
Ohio	Belefontaine	Post Office			Cost of marble: $707
Ohio	Cleveland	City Hall			Cost of marble: $125,000
Ohio		Cuyahoga County Courthouse			Cost of marble: $500,000
Ohio	Jayville	Abbottsville Memorial			
Ohio	Sidney	First National Bank			
Ohio	Versailles	Mausoleum			Cost of marble: $6,000
Ohio	Wooster	Post Office			Cost of marble: $777
Ohio	Youngstown	Mahoning County Court House			
Oregon	Portland	Bedell Building			
Oregon		First National Bank Building			
Oregon		Northwest National Bank			
Oklahoma	Enid	High School			
Oklahoma	Tulsa	Studebaker Company Building			
Oklahoma		Tulsa County Court House (demolished)			Cost of marble: $4,360
Oklahoma		Tulsa High School			
Rhode Island	Providence	Providence County Courthouse			
South Dakota	Aberdeen	United States Post Office and Courthouse			
Tennessee	Memphis	Commercial Trust & Savings Bank			
Texas	Houston	Southern Pacific Building (today – Bayou Lofts)			Cost of marble: $13,000 (Note: Converted in 1998 to lofts, with an effort to preserve the architectural integrity of the building. "Historic Adaptive Restoration: Bayou Lofts". Gabriel Architects. Bivins, Ralph (11 January 1998). "Spire buys Southern Pacific Building, to build loft condos". Business. Houston Chronicle. p. 10.)
Texas		Union National Bank (today Hotel Icon)			Cost of marble: $1,000
Utah	Salt Lake City	Boston Building			
Utah		Denver & Rio Grand / Western Pacific Railroad Station (Union Building)			
Utah		Holmes-Knox Building			
Utah		Latter Day Saints Gymnasium			
Utah		Newhouse Hotel			Cost of marble: $10,000
Utah		Utah State Capitol			Cost of marble: $167,000
Utah		Stock & Mining Exchange			
Virginia	Arlington	Tomb of the Unknowns (aka Tomb of the Unknown Soldier)			
Washington	Seattle	Union Bank			Cost of marble: $698
Washington	Walla Walla	Court House			Cost of marble: $10,000
Wisconsin	Oshkosh	Private Vault			Cost of marble: $309
Wyoming	Sheridan	Bank			

== See also ==
- List of types of marble
