= Johnson Stage Station =

- U.S. National Register of Historic Places
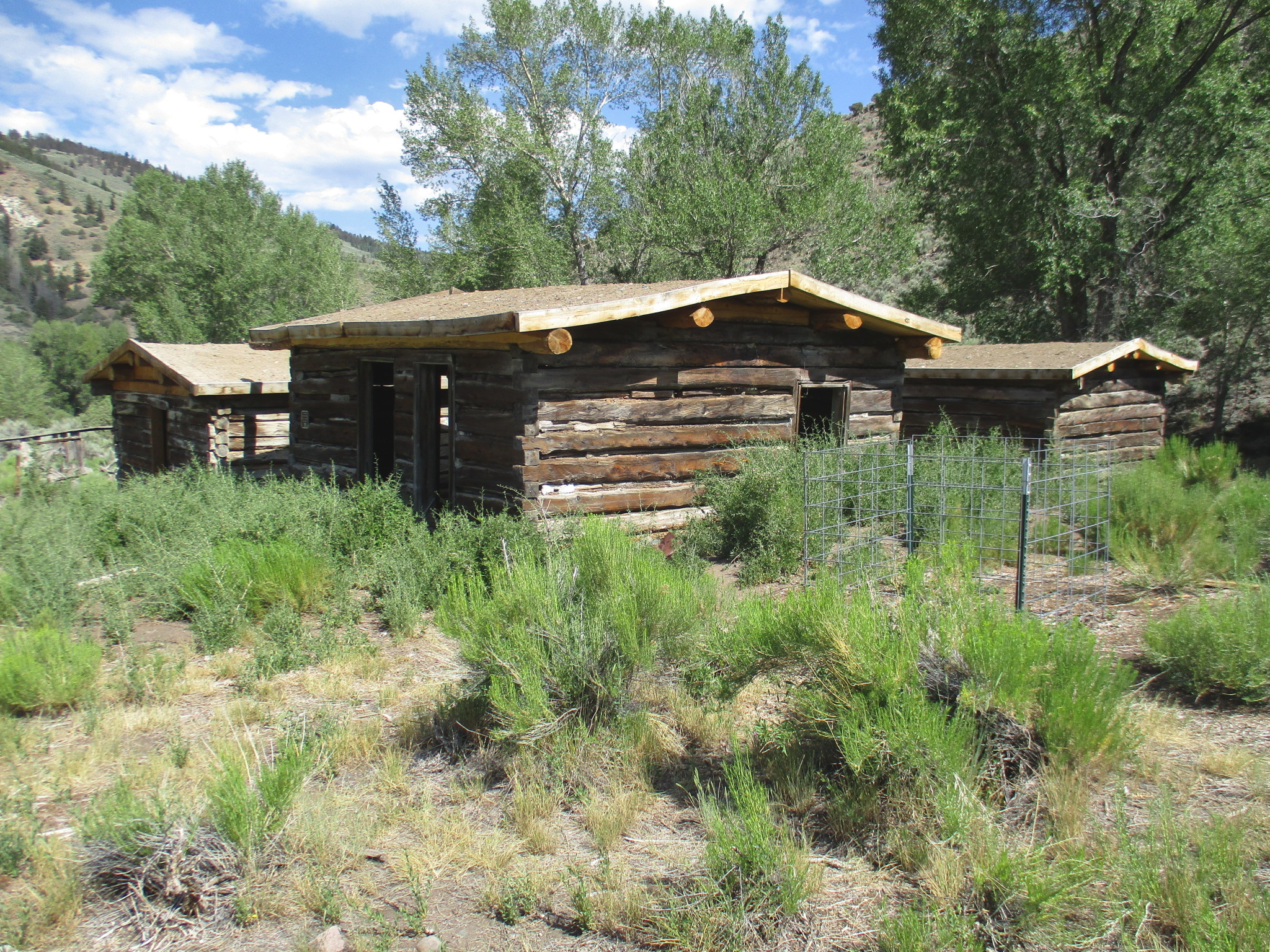
- Johnson Stage Station, 2021

- Location within Colorado
- Location: Powderhorn, Colorado vicinity, Gunnison, Colorado
- Coordinates: 38°19′14″N 107°13′23″W
- Area: 1.9 acres (0.77 ha)
- Built: 1878
- NRHP reference No.: 16000667
- Added to NRHP: August 28, 2017

The Johnson Stage Station, between Gunnison, Colorado and Lake City, Colorado, was listed on the National Register of Historic Places in 2017.

It is the site of a stage station built in 1878 and is located at the junction of routes south to the mining town of Lake City, north to Sapinero, and northeast to Gunnison. Charley Johnson based his freight service there and also provided layover shelter for travelers and other freight haulers.

The station was bought in 1890 by Nathan C. Carr and sons, who developed it as a productive ranch. The station became the residence and headquarters of the family's sawmill and ranching operations. The site also includes a family cemetery.

Ownership was transferred to the Bureau of Land Management in 1997.

In 2015 a historic structure assessment was done of four historic cabins at the site.

It is located about 2.2 miles (3.5 km) north (Note: The source says "south" where "north" would be correct.") of the junction of County Road 64 & Colorado State Highway 149. (Note: Source misstates highway as a U.S. Route; it is a Colorado State Highway.)
