= Marble, Colorado =

Town in Colorado, United States

Town of Marble, Colorado
- Statutory town
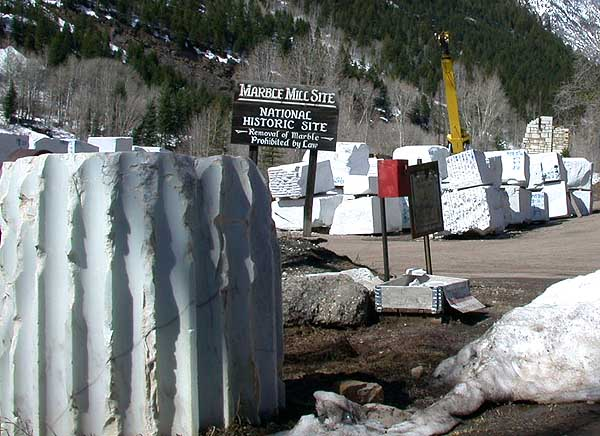
- Blocks of cut marble at the historic quarry in Marble

- Location of Marble in Gunnison County, Colorado.
- Coordinates: 39°04′18″N 107°11′27″W
- Country: United States
- State: Colorado
- County: Gunnison
- Incorporated: 1899

Government
  - Type: Statutory town

Area
  - Total: 0.36 sq mi (0.93 km^{2})
  - Land: 0.36 sq mi (0.93 km^{2})
  - Water: 0 sq mi (0.00 km^{2})
- Elevation: 8,009 ft (2,441 m)

Population (2020)
  - Total: 133
  - Density: 370/sq mi (140/km^{2})
- Time zone: UTC-7 (Mountain (MST))
  - Summer (DST): UTC-6 (MDT)
- ZIP code: 81623
- Area code: 970
- FIPS code: 08-48555
- GNIS feature ID: 2412952
- Website: www.townofmarble.com

The Town of Marble is a statutory town in Gunnison County, Colorado, United States. The town population was 133 at the 2020 United States census.

== History ==
The Town of Marble was first incorporated in 1899. Marble remains a statutory town of the State of Colorado today.

=== The quarry ===
The town is the location of a historic Yule Marble quarry along the mountains that began operations in the late 19th century, and from which the town draws its name. It has been used for the Tomb of the Unknowns, as well as for parts of the Lincoln Memorial in Washington, D.C., and civic buildings in San Francisco. It was also used for the construction of the Equitable Building, a historically important early skyscraper in New York City.

The marble of the quarry is considered to be of exceptional quality, praised as one of the purest marbles ever quarried and a rival to classical Italian and Greek marble. It is nearly pure calcite marble with minor inclusions of mica, quartz, and feldspar, and has irregularly shaped calcite grains ranging from 100 to 600 micrometers in diameter. According to physical tests of the marble, its strength is comparable to marble typically used in building construction.

The quarry has enjoyed a renaissance since its acquisition in 2004 by Polycor, a Canadian-based dimension stone company, and subsequent sale to Italian group R.E.D. Graniti S.p.A. In spite of significant transportation costs, this high-quality stone is now exported in large quantities to Europe and Asia for transformation and use throughout the world, as well as being sold into the US market.

=== Tourism ===
In the late 20th century and the 21st century, Marble has become a summer tourist destination. It is also the gateway to the nearby Crystal townsite. It is the site of the Marble/marble sculpting symposium held every summer since 1988.

Eight sites within Marble have been listed on the National Register of Historic Places.

- Haxby House
- William D. Parry House
- St. Paul's Church
- Marble City State Bank building
- Marble High School
- Marble Jailhouse
- Marble Mill Site
- Marble Town Hall

== Geography ==
According to the United States Census Bureau, the town has a total area of 0.4 square miles (1.0 km^{2}), all of it land.

The community is located in a valley of the upper Crystal River along the Elk Mountains, accessible by a paved road from State Highway 133. Unlike most of Gunnison County, the town is located on the north side of Schofield Pass which is inaccessible to most cars and thus is separated geographically from the rest of Gunnison County.

== Demographics ==
Historical population
Census	Pop.	Note	%±
1900	101		—
1910	782		674.3%
1920	81		−89.6%
1930	217		167.9%
1940	240		10.6%
1950	8		−96.7%
1960	5		−37.5%
1970	13		160.0%
1980	30		130.8%
1990	64		113.3%
2000	105		64.1%
2010	131		24.8%
2020	133		1.5%

== Education ==
Marble Charter School (MCS) is a public, tuition-free charter school located in Marble. The school serves K-8 students in the Crystal River Valley.

== See also ==
- West Elk Mountains
- Yule Marble
