= Old Mill =

Old Mill may refer to:

== Animations ==
- The Old Mill, a 1937 Academy Award-winning Silly Symphonies cartoon produced by Walt Disney
- The Old Mill Pond, a 1936 Academy Award nominated short film directed by Hugh Harman

== Places ==
=== Canada ===
- Old Mill Park (Shawnigan Lake), in Shawnigan Lake, British Columbia
- Old Mill, Toronto, a neighbourhood of Toronto
  - Old Mill Toronto, an historic mill in Toronto
  - Old Mill (TTC), a subway station there

=== United Kingdom ===
- Old Mill, Cornwall, a place in Cornwall

=== United States ===
- John Wood Old Mill, Merrillville, Indiana
- Old Mill House, Le Claire, Iowa
- Old Mill Site Historic District, a historic district in Hatfield, Massachusetts
- Old Mill (West Tisbury, Massachusetts)
- Old Mill State Park WPA/Rustic Style Historic Resources, Argyle, Minnesota, listed on the NRHP in Minnesota
- Ramsey Mill and Old Mill Park, ruin of a water-powered gristmill in Hastings, Minnesota
- Old Mill at Montauk State Park, Salem, Missouri, listed on the NRHP in Missouri
- Old Mill at Tinton Falls, Tinton Falls, New Jersey
- Old Mill Museum (Dundee, Michigan)
- The Old Mill (Nantucket, Massachusetts)
- The Old Mill (San Marino, California), a former grist mill in San Marino, California
- Old Mill (University of Vermont), a historic campus building in Burlington, Vermont
- Calvert Mill/Washington Mill or The Old Mill, an historic mill located on Old Mill Road in Washington, Virginia
- Crystal Mill or The Old Mill
- Pigeon Forge Mill, commonly called the "Old Mill," a historic gristmill in Pigeon Forge, Tennessee
- T. R. Pugh Memorial Park or The Old Mill, a re-creation of an 1880s era water-powered grist mill in North Little Rock, Arkansas

== Windmills ==
=== Australia ===
- Old Mill, Perth

=== England ===
- Old Mill, Aldbrough, a windmill in the East Riding of Yorkshire
- Old Mill, Amberley, a windmill in West Sussex
- Old Mill, Ashington, a windmill in West Sussex
- Old Mill, Barnham, a windmill in West Sussex
- Old Mill, Barrow, a windmill in Suffolk
- Old Mill, Beckley, a windmill in East Sussex
- Old Mill, Beddingham, a windmill in East Sussex
- Old Mill, Bethersden, a windmill in Kent
- Old Mill, Bosham, a windmill in West Sussex
- Old Mill, Bramford, Coseley, a windmill in Staffordshire
- Old Mill, The Dicker, Chiddingly, a windmill in East Sussex
- Old Mill, Chidham, a windmill in West Sussex
- Old Mill, Compton, a windmill in West Sussex
- Old Mill, Cross in Hand, a windmill in East Sussex
- Old Mill, Eastbourne, a windmill in East Sussex
- Old Mill, East Ruston, a windmill in Norfolk
- Old Mill, Fairlight, a windmill in East Sussex
- Old Mill, Falmer, a windmill in East Sussex
- Old Mill, Findon, a windmill in West Sussex
- Old Mill, Forest Row, a windmill in East Sussex
- Old Mill, Guestling, a windmill in East Sussex
- Old Mill, Hawkinge, a windmill in Kent
- Old Mill, Hellingly, a windmill in East Sussex
- Old Mill, Henfield, a windmill in West Sussex
- Old Mill, Keyingham, a windmill in the East Riding of Yorkshire
- Old Mill, Little Horsted, a windmill in East Sussex
- Old Mill, Lydd, a windmill in Kent
- Old Mill, Margate, Kent
- Old Mill, Newick, a windmill in East Sussex
- Old Mill, New Romney, a windmill in Kent
- Old Mill, Northbourne, a windmill in Kent
- Old Mill, Northchapel, a windmill in West Sussex
- Old Mill, Northiam, a windmill in East Sussex
- Old Mill, Oving, a windmill in West Sussex
- Old Mill, Petworth, a windmill in West Sussex
- Old Mill, Playden, a windmill in East Sussex
- Old Mill, Plumstead, a windmill in Norfolk
- Old Mill, Preston next Wingham, a windmill in Kent
- Old Mill, Prittlewell, a windmill in Essex
- Old Mill, Ripe, a windmill in East Sussex
- Old Mill, Rodmell, a windmill in East Sussex
- Old Mill, Rusper, a windmill in West Sussex
- Old Mill, Rye, a windmill in East Sussex
- Old Mill, Seaton Ross, a windmill in the East Riding of Yorkshire
- Old Mill, Shoreham, a windmill in West Sussex
- Old Mill, Southam, a windmill in Warwickshire
- Old Mill, Swingfield, a windmill in Kent
- Old Mill, Takeley, a windmill in Essex
- Old Mill, Thaxted, a windmill in Essex
- Old Mill, Uckfield, a windmill in East Sussex
- Old Mill, West Kingsdown, Kent
- Old Mill, Whatlington, a windmill in East Sussex
- Old Mill, Wicklewood, a windmill in Norfolk
- Old Mill, Wighton, a windmill in Norfolk
- Old Mill, Willesborough, a windmill in Kent
- Old Mill, Willingdon, a windmill in East Sussex
- Old Mill, Wittersham, a windmill in Kent
- Old Mill, Woodham Mortimer, a windmill in Essex
- Old Mill, Worlingworth, a windmill in Suffolk
- Glover's Old Mill, Blean, a windmill in Kent
- Lashmar's Old Mill, Brighton, a windmill in East Sussex
- Tivoli Old Mill, St Leonard's, a windmill in East Sussex
- Dilnot's Old Mill, Waltham, a windmill in Kent
- Old Mill Green Mill, Wetheringsett, a windmill in Suffolk
- Ruiton Old Mill, Sedgeley, a windmill in Staffordshire

=== United States ===
- Old Mill, Addison, a windmill in Illinois
- Old Mill, East Orleans, a windmill in Massachusetts
- Old Mill, Nantucket, a windmill in Massachusetts
- Old Mill, Sandwich, a windmill in Massachusetts
- Old Mill, Tinley Park, a windmill in Illinois
- Franzen's Old Mill, Golden, a windmill in Illinois
- Old Emmon's Estate Mill, Falmouth, a windmill in Massachusetts
- Old Higgins Farm Mill, Brewster, a windmill in Massachusetts
- Old Mill Farm Mill, Winnetka, a windmill in Illinois

== Watermills ==
=== England ===
- Old Mill, Bexley, on the River Cray, Kent
- Old Mill, Borough Green, on the River Bourne, Kent
- Old Mill, Eynsford, on the River Darent, Kent
- Old Mill, Hollingbourne, also known as Old Mill, Leeds, on the River Len, Kent
- Old Mill, Loose, on the Loose Stream, Kent
- Old Mill, South Darenth, on the River Darent, Kent
- The Old Mill, Hampsthwaite, North Yorkshire

=== United States ===
- Old Mill (West Tisbury, Massachusetts)
- Old Mill (Vermilion, Ohio), listed on the NRHP in Erie County, Ohio
- Old Mill, Crystal, Colorado

== Other uses ==
- The Old Mill, former location of and alternative name for the National Motor Museum, Birdwood, South Australia
- Old Mill (ride), a type of amusement ride
- Old Mill, Manchester, part of the Murrays' Mills complex in North West England
- The Old Mill, part of Fantasyland in Disneyland Park, Paris, France

== See also ==
- Old Mill Road Bridge, Rocky Ridge, MD
- Old Mill School (disambiguation)
- Old Dutch Mill (disambiguation)
- Oudemolen (disambiguation)
- The Old Windmill, Coventry, England
- The Old Windmill, Appleton Roebuck, England
- The Old Windmill, Brisbane, Queensland, Australia
