= Redstone Historic District (Colorado) =

Historic district in Colorado, United States

- U.S. National Register of Historic Places
- U.S. Historic district
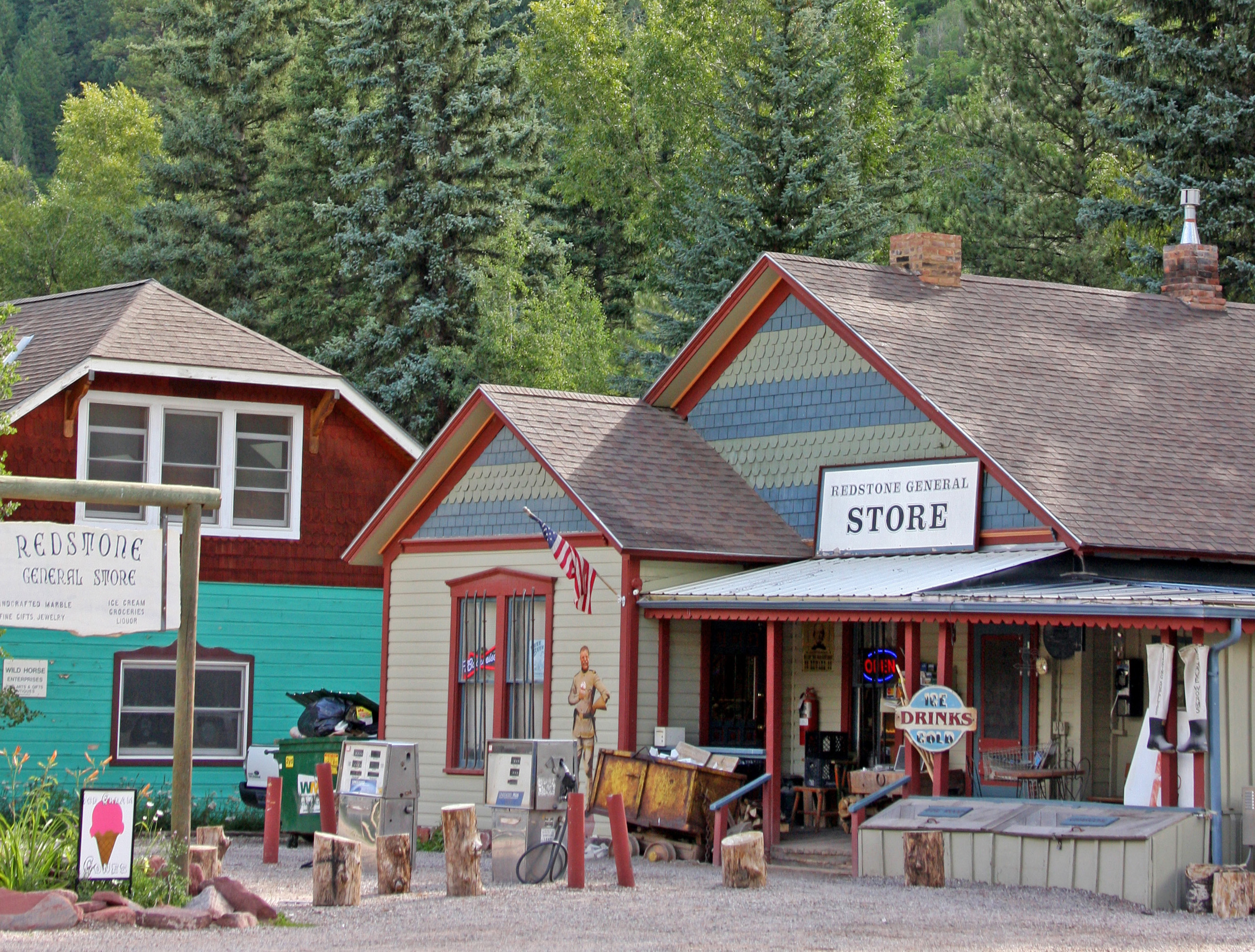
- General store and adjacent cottage, 2010

- Location within Colorado
- Location: Redstone, CO
- Nearest city: Aspen
- Coordinates: 39°10′51″N 107°14′22″W
- Area: 493 acres (200 ha)
- Built: 1900–1903
- Architect: Theodore Boal
- Architectural style: Various Victorian
- MPS: Historic Resources of Redstone, Mining Industry in Colorado
- NRHP reference No.: 89000934
- Added to NRHP: July 19, 1989

The Redstone Historic District is located in the unincorporated community of Redstone in western Pitkin County, Colorado, in the United States. It includes the original community of Redstone as built by Colorado Fuel and Iron (CFI) for the coal miners it employed. In 1989, it was recognized as a historic district and listed on the National Register of Historic Places.

== Background ==
Redstone was originally a company town. John Cleveland Osgood, CFI's president at the time, spent lavishly to create quality housing for miners and their families, as well as various other public buildings, in an effort to forestall unionization. Architect Theodore Boal designed simple yet attractive structures by adapting various Victorian architectural styles. The district includes as contributing properties Osgood's estate, Cleveholm, and the Redstone Inn.

At first, very populous and successful due to the high production capacity of the nearby coke ovens, Redstone was almost abandoned within a decade when it became too costly to transport coke from the remote community to CFI's new steel mill. A handful of residents remained, keeping Redstone from becoming another one of Colorado's many ghost towns. Some of its original buildings were demolished over the years. Eventually, the town rebounded slightly, and today it is home to a small arts community. Many of the remaining buildings have been restored, making it one of the few intact company towns remaining in the state.

== Geography ==
The district is formed by the original townsite for Redstone, using original surveyed lot boundaries on the north, south, and east. It is a strip of land running north–south along the Crystal River for a mile and a half (2.4 km). Redstone Boulevard (also County Route 3), lined with some of its original Llewellyn Westinghouse cast-iron streetlamps, is the backbone of the district.

On the west, its boundary follows either State Highway 133 or the east bank of the river for roughly one mile from 242 Redstone, and the parallel point on Hill Road, in the north, the limit of the historic portion of town, to where Hawk Creek flows into the Crystal south of Osgood Castle. The 493 acres (200 ha) within those boundaries make it the largest of the four historic districts in the county.

It includes 32 buildings, three structures, and one object. Most of the buildings are small wood-framed cottages; the larger buildings are primarily located along the mountain slopes. Two of the larger buildings, the castle and the Redstone Inn, are themselves listed on the Register.

A bridge leads across the river to Highway 133, the only road to Redstone. Just across it is the smaller Redstone Coke Oven Historic District, the remains of the coking facilities that employed many Redstone residents during the peak of its prosperity. On either side of Redstone, mountains rise to summits over 12,000 feet (3,700 m). Their slopes are mostly undeveloped and part of White River National Forest. The eastern slopes are additionally part of the Maroon Bells–Snowmass Wilderness that separates Redstone from the county seat, Aspen, 22.5 miles (36.2 km) due east.

== History ==
The history of Redstone parallels the history of the industrialization of the West. After a long prehistory of exploration and colonization, the town's remote resources were exploited and made accessible for a brief period of prosperity. Once the mining stopped, the town faded almost as quickly as it grew. It has avoided becoming a ghost town by embracing tourism.

=== 1700s–1860: European settlement of the Crystal River Valley ===
Traders and trappers working for the Astor family in the 1830s were the first Europeans to visit the region. John C. Frémont led two American expeditions during the 1840s. Prospectors would come looking unsuccessfully for gold.

Treaties with the Utes, the Native American tribe that had long claimed the Crystal Valley and other lands in today's Pitkin County as home, made it more amenable to settlement after the Civil War. The state and federal governments hoped that mineral resources in the region might be developed that way, but did not know what those resources might be. Ferdinand Vandeveer Hayden's 1873 survey provided some answers, in the form of rich coal deposits in the mountains. He also gave many of the mountains and streams their names.

=== 1880–1900: Early mine development ===
In the portions of the upper Crystal Valley located in what is today Gunnison County, settlement, Crystal and Schofield, now ghost towns, sprang up around early silver and lead strikes. By 1880, the Ute had been forced to cede their land and leave the area for reservations. With this last impediment to potential riches removed, prospectors and other fortune seekers were everywhere in the valley.

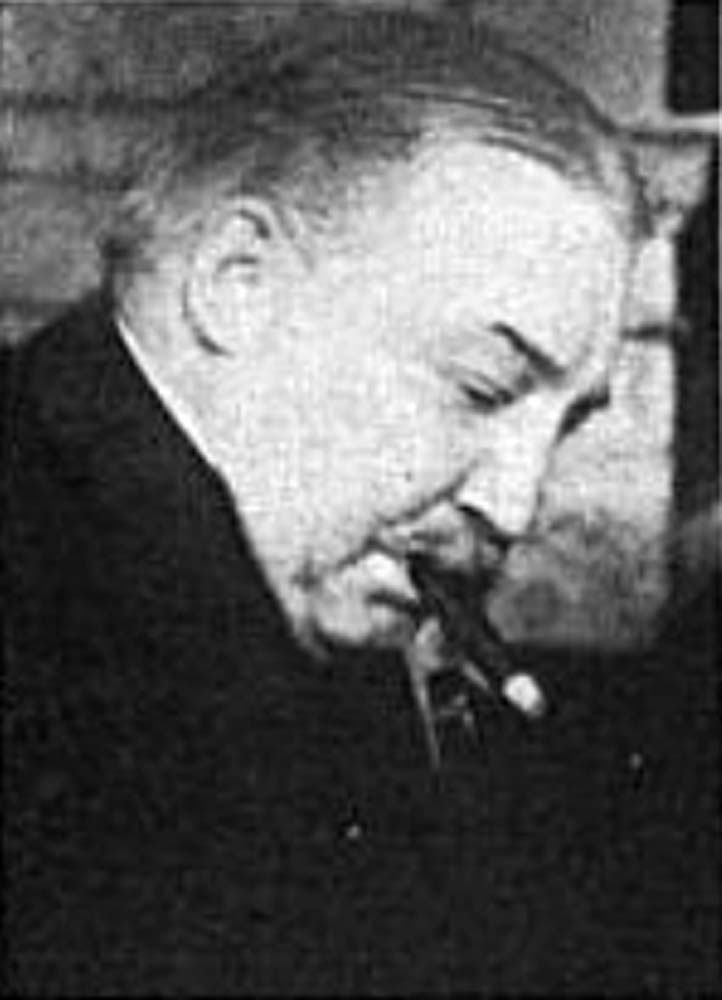
John Cleveland Osgood

Among them was John C. Osgood, doing a survey of the state's coal resources for the coal company he worked for and the Chicago, Burlington and Quincy Railroad (CBQRR), one of its major customers. The coal in the Crystal Valley was plentiful and of high enough quality that he started his own company, Colorado Fuel. His main customer was a CBQRR subsidiary, the Burlington and Missouri River Railroad. As he sold to them, he bought land, hoping to exploit one day deposits of coal that would make high-quality coke.

To realize these plans, it would be necessary to build transportation infrastructure. The company took the legal steps necessary to build both a toll road and a railroad. Apart from some surveying, nothing else was accomplished. A line that might have connected to the valley, the Aspen and Western Railway, was built to coalfields at Willow Park near Carbondale in 1888 by Colorado Fuel's main rival at the time. It was abandoned as quickly as it had been built when the coal proved inferior.

The two companies merged in 1892 and became Colorado Fuel and Iron (CF&I). It soon became the largest coal mining company in the entire West, responsible for two-thirds of Colorado's output. The profits from these endeavors at last gave Osgood the capital he needed to fully exploit the Crystal Valley. Due to bank failures around Colorado and other aftereffects of the Panic of 1893, it took the rest of the 1890s before financing was in place and actual construction could start. Another delay, caused by a United Mine Workers of America strike, left Osgood bitterly opposed to unions.

From the railroad line, a narrow gauge spur would parallel Coal Creek, climbing up 12 miles (19 km) and 2,200 feet (670 m) to an area where the coal was pure, with almost no ash, thus ideal for coking. At that site, the town of Coalbasin was built. Where it reached the main line in the valley, at the coke ovens, the coal and coke would be taken to Carbondale and points elsewhere by the Denver and Rio Grande Western and Colorado Midland. The town around that junction was named Redstone, for the high cliffs of orange sandstone in the mountains above.

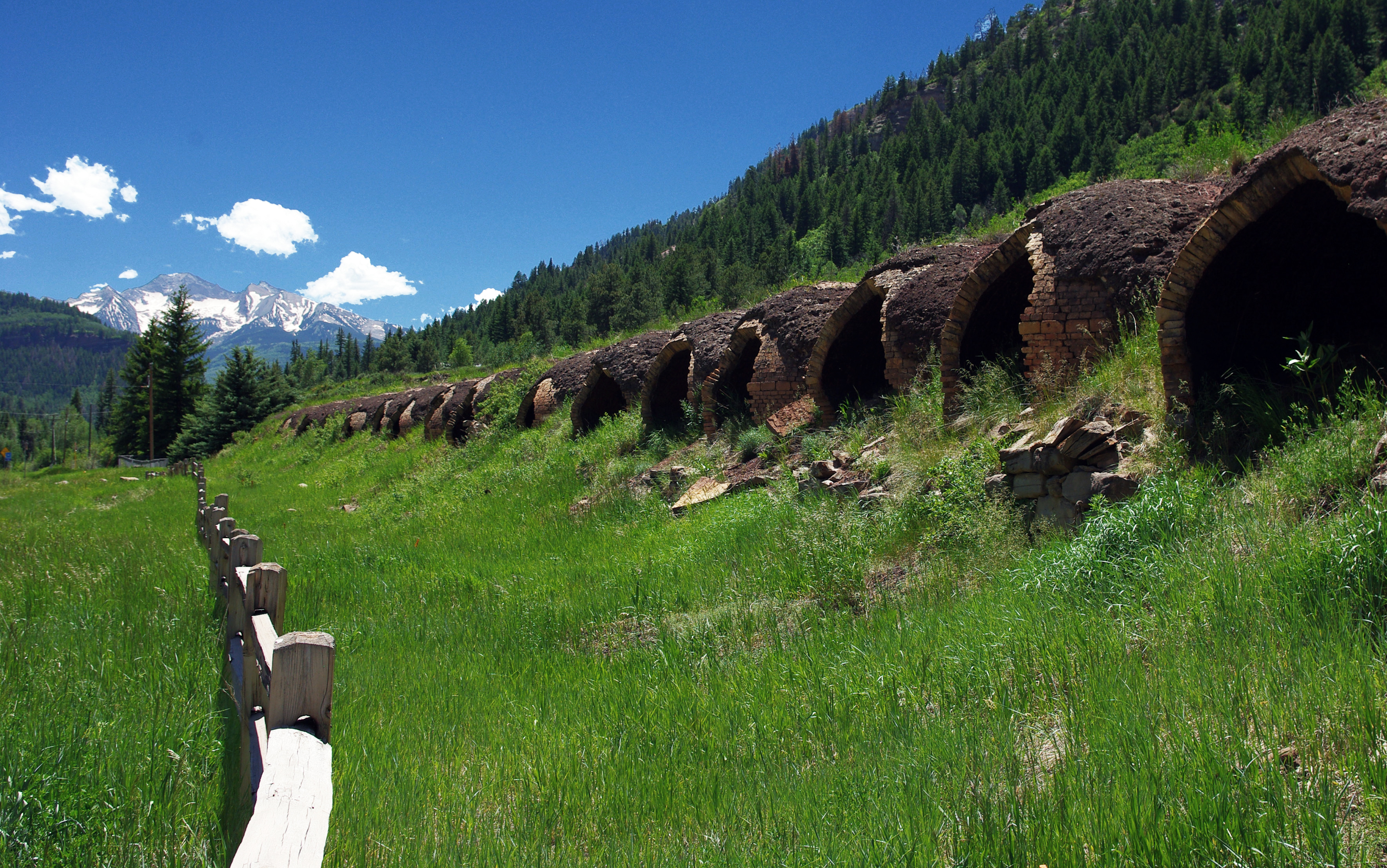
Remaining coke ovens

=== 1900–1903: Company town ===
Almost 250 ovens were built by workers from Denver to handle the Coalbasin coal, making it the largest such facility in the state. The workers there, 10 percent of all the workers in the state at that time, were predominantly immigrants from Eastern Europe whom the company had recruited from the East. The miners, by contrast, were usually longtime Colorado residents who had worked in mines elsewhere.

Mining towns in 19th-century Colorado had often been built by the miners themselves out of whatever material they could find and assemble in their spare time. Often, these wound up being log cabins covered with rock and dirt. The companies had to provide other public services due to the remoteness of many camps, but did nothing to provide living quarters. In the labor unrest of the era, the shabby and unsafe housing, which miners often shared with their families, was a frequent source of complaint.

Osgood, who had built his estate nearby, thought it was time to change that. The miners would be happier if they lived in decent accommodations, and happier miners would be more productive and less likely to strike. Inspired by the company towns built in New England, and more recently Pullman, Illinois, established by that company for its workers, he decided that Redstone would be a model for other CFI towns. He had personally acquired much land in the valley and spent nearly $5 million ($186 million in modern dollars) to build it.

After adding running water and building homes at El Moro, a camp near Trinidad, CFI concluded it was possible to do the same on a larger scale with Redstone. At the time, the miners' shacks were clustered around the coke ovens on the western side of the river. Osgood decided the company town would be on the other side, away from an improvised, unplanned development that represented the way mining communities had been to that point. There, he hoped, the workers would live "free of strife and want." CFI established a Sociological Department to oversee education, social and industrial training, housing, and communications.

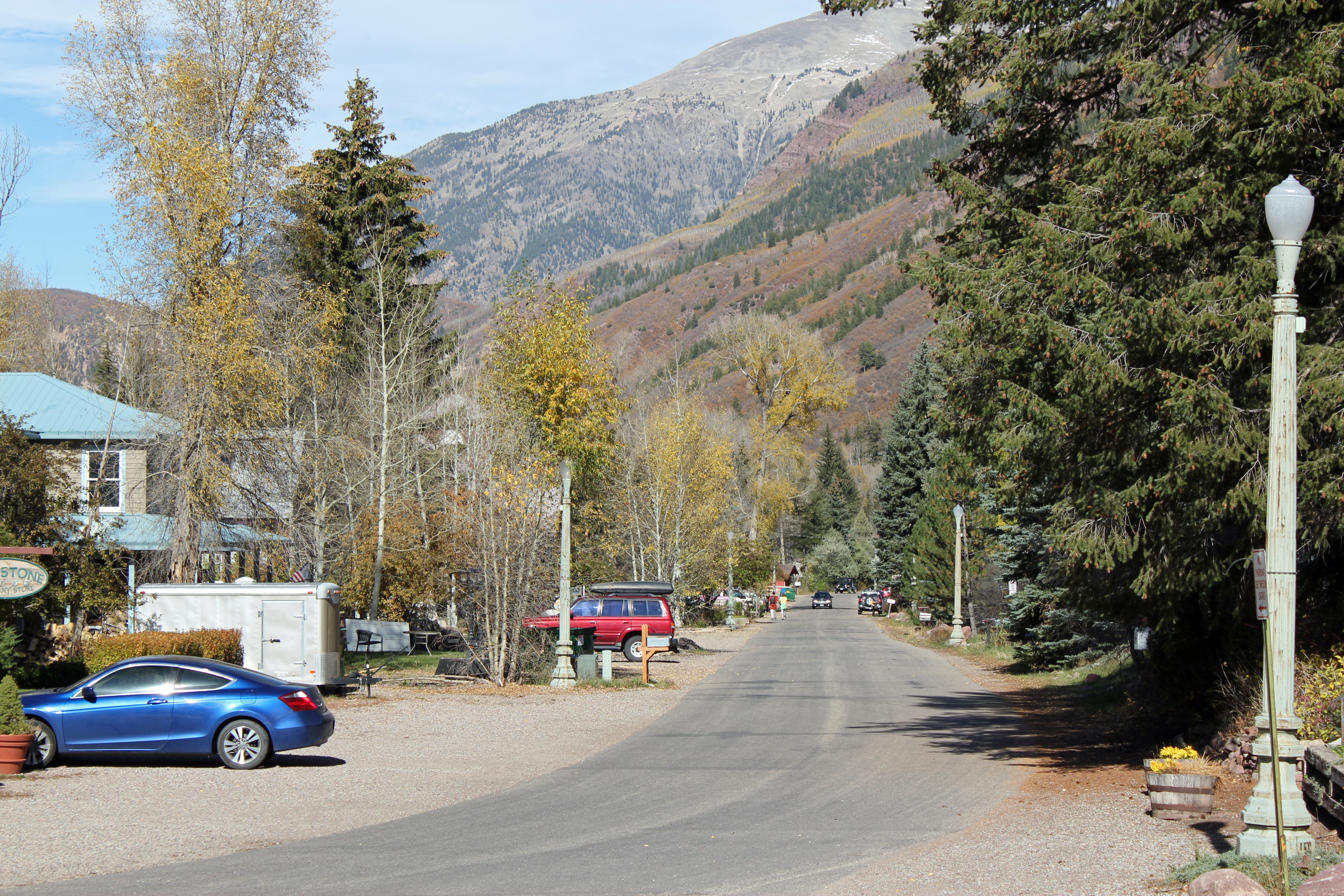
View north along Redstone Boulevard, 2011

==== Plan ====
A planned townsite was laid out. There would be two streets: River Road (now Redstone Boulevard), the main street, and Hill Road, a side street slightly uphill from it to the east. In between, there were occasional alleys and back streets with switchbacks. River Road ran all the way south to Osgood's estate. A railroad spur crossed the Crystal to run between River Road and the river, for passenger traffic and freight shipments to the town, allowing the main line to be used exclusively for coal and coke loading and unloading at the ovens. The commercial center of Redstone would be at the rail depot, just opposite the coke ovens; the rest of the town would be residential.

Theodore Boal, who had designed Osgood Castle, was commissioned to supervise the design of Redstone's buildings. He adapted many popular Victorian styles to the mountain setting. In particular, he was enamored of the Swiss chalet style, popularized a half-century earlier by the influential Eastern architect and critic Andrew Jackson Downing in his pattern book The Architecture of Country Houses. On that basic form, he chose decorative elements from the Shingle, Dutch Colonial Revival, and Tudorbethan styles.

The first group of one-story frame cottages, meant for the coke oven workers, was finished in 1901. Structurally, they were an improvement over the improvised shacks they were intended to replace. Instead of the board-and-batten siding common in other late 19th-century Colorado mining towns, they had clapboard or shiplap, painted in pleasant, "restful" pastel colors. Half-timber was a common decorative feature. Windows were generally two-over-two double-hung sash. At the rooflines were wide overhanging eaves meant to provide shelter from bad weather, decorated with wavy vergeboards and shaped wooden brackets. Their main blocks' hipped roofs, considered more picturesque by Downing, were pierced by gabled dormers and center chimneys. They were complemented by gabled or shed roofs on the porches. Many had outbuildings, some even themselves with decoration. Inside, the houses had three to five rooms. Amenities included electricity, provided at 35 cents ($10) a month in modern dollars a month from a hydroelectric plant the company built on the Crystal, and running water, luxuries unknown to worker housing in previous mining towns.

Larger buildings included the Tudor Revival Redstone Inn, originally a 40-room dormitory for the unmarried employees, at the south end of the center of town. In addition to electricity and running water, it had telephones, a barbershop, a laundry, and a reading room. The company store at the north end was a timber-frame building closer in style to the cottages. Behind it was a fenced park and Lake Gibb, which froze over and allowed for ice skating in the winter.

On Hill Road near the store was the Tudor Revival school, with a stone entrance tower. The company paid for the teachers and textbooks. The school had one of the earliest kindergartens in Colorado. In addition to educating the children of the miners, the school also did what is today called adult education. English classes were offered to students' parents, particularly those employed at the ovens, so they could work more efficiently. Workers' wives attended classes in "domestic science," which is known today as home economics.

Nearby was the two-and-a-half-story wood-frame Redstone Club, recreational facilities for the workers. It included a billiard and pool room, a reading room, and a bar. At the latter facility, treating others to drinks was prohibited, a policy that CFI had implemented in Coalbasin and found effective in limiting the impact of alcohol consumption on the quality of life. Upstairs was a theater; the basement held showers, baths, and dressing rooms.

The club was complemented by the Big Horn Lodge across the river, meant for company meetings, banquets, and entertaining guests from out of town. Its amenities included a bowling alley in the basement. It was less preferable for this purpose since the air around it was often polluted by smoke from the coke ovens. Nearby was the town cemetery and public gardens. Each family was offered a plot where, it was hoped, they could grow fresh vegetables, and perhaps raise a cow as well for milk. The company built a 195-foot (59 m) barn to house workers' livestock. Near the power plant was the firehouse. It was a two-story frame building with half-timbers, wood shingles, and diamond-paned windows. Inside was one hand-drawn pumper.

Construction continued throughout 1902, as the ovens went full blast. Redstone attracted national attention. At that year's St. Louis Exposition, it received an award. The New York Times wrote about "The Ruby of the Rockies", as the community came to be nicknamed, calling it "a town to rave over ... the most beautiful town in Colorado."

By 1903, 83 cottages had been completed. South of the center of town, a second group was started. These were intended for miners, middle managers, and white-collar workers. They were located between two of the larger houses meant for senior managers. Architecturally, they were similar to the workers' cottages in the center of town, but they were located on larger lots on the hillside with greater setbacks from the road, giving them a view over the valley. Mature trees were left standing, making the neighborhood seem carefully landscaped

Just north of Osgood's estate, at the south end of River Road, were the houses of senior managers. They were the largest (save the castle), with more sweeping views and more elaborate ornamentation. A map from the time identifies one on the hillside above Hill Road as the superintendent's house.

While they lived at the estate, Osgood and his wife, Alma, were a frequent presence among the workers. The two regularly attended public ceremonies and celebrations. Osgood personally checked on how miners were doing and donated supplies when needed. Alma, known as Lady Bountiful by the workers, entertained visitors at the estate and made sure that all the latest fashions were available at the store. During construction, Boal was frequently about town reporting to Osgood.

=== 1904–present: Decline and preservation ===
As construction was completed, CFI was encountering financial difficulties due to strikes at its facilities elsewhere in the state and its heavy investment in its Pueblo plant. To resolve them, Osgood was forced to surrender control of the company to interests controlled by the Gould and Rockefeller families. He remained active in the state, starting the Victor American Fuel Company, which became CFI's major competitor. But he began spending more time back in New York and less in Redstone, making him less able to guide the town's progress. The new managers cared less about the community than he had.

In 1908, CFI decided to consolidate all coke production at Pueblo, as it was too expensive to maintain the Redstone facility. The ovens were shut down that year; the mines at Coalbasin the next. Families left their possessions behind in a hurry to catch the last train out. Redstone dwindled to a small caretaker population of less than a dozen.

Osgood eventually closed down his estate in 1913. He continued to be involved in the Colorado mining industry, and was questioned by both state and federal investigators in the wake of the Ludlow Massacre the following year, in which workers at CFI mines in the south central region of the state revolted against the paternalist approach the company took, where it had provided schools, libraries and churches for miners yet continued to engage in exploitative labor practices in the mines. In the aftermath, John D. Rockefeller felt that Osgood's recalcitrance and apparent insensitivity to the miners' concerns vindicated his belief that poor character led to social conflict.

In 1924 Osgood returned to Redstone. He and his third wife, Lucille, took up residence in the castle once again and began redeveloping it as a resort. Ill with cancer, he died the following year and his ashes were scattered over the valley. Lucille inherited the estate, and finished the redevelopment, only to have the hotel fail quickly as the Great Depression ruined the tourist trade.

Just 14 people lived in Redstone by 1941. During the war, many of its larger buildings, such as the school, clubhouse and Big Horn Lodge, were demolished and sold for salvage. The community's decline stopped the following year, when another company resumed coal mining operations in the Coalbasin area. But the loss of the original buildings continued, as many of the cottages were either demolished as a result of the neglect after so many winters at 7,200 feet (2,200 m) above sea level in the mountains, or moved. After the resurgence of Aspen as a resort in the late 20th century, Redstone began to gain residents and attract tourists who valued its historic buildings. The Redstone Inn was eventually restored and reopened in its present use, and the castle was opened for tours. Some of the remaining cottages have become bed and breakfasts; the town is also home to a small informal art colony.

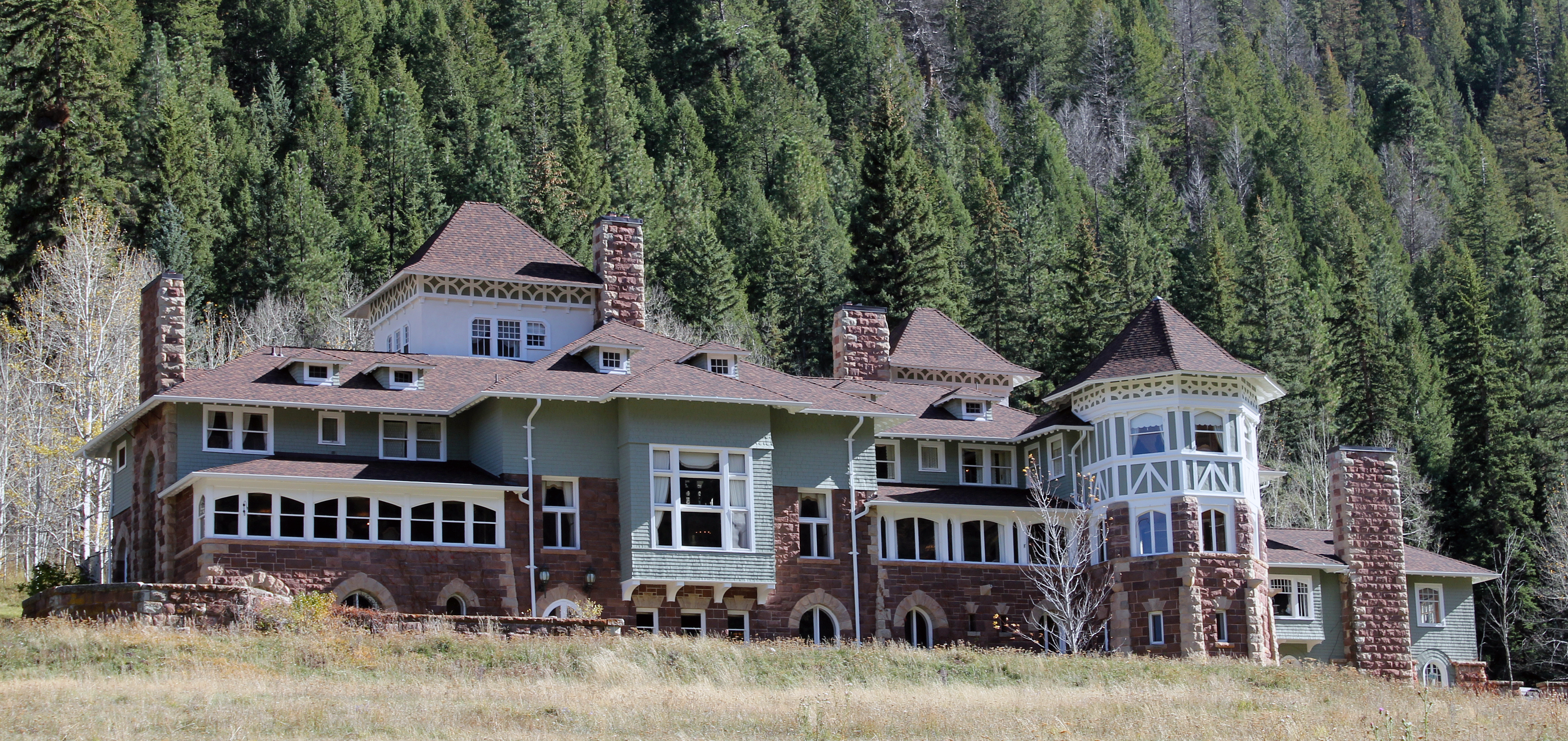
Osgood Castle

== Significant contributing properties ==
Many of the original cottages and most of the larger buildings from Redstone's peak years have been demolished, but some noteworthy structures remain from the era. Two have been listed on the National Register themselves.

- General Store, 292 Redstone Boulevard. The Palace Company ran this one-and-half-story timber-frame building with clipped gables, shingle and shiplap siding and diamond-paned windows. It was the best-equipped company store at any CFI location after Pueblo.
- North Gatekeeper's Lodge, 58 Redstone Boulevard. The only one of the two such building's for Osgood's estate left. It is a frame building on a rusticated stone foundation, topped by a cross-gabled roof with decorative vergeboards and broad overhanging eaves. The remains of a ski lift, from brief mid-20th century use as a ski resort, are nearby.
- Osgood Castle, south end of Redstone Boulevard, also known as Cleveholm or Redstone Castle. Osgood's estate, designed by Boal, was a 42-room Tudor Revival mansion with interior furnishings personally chosen by the Osgoods on trips to Europe. He entertained guests including King Leopold II of Belgium, John D. Rockefeller and President Theodore Roosevelt. It was listed on the National Register in 1971, the first property in Pitkin County to be so recognized. There are currently plans to convert it into a resort; tours are offered to visitors.
- Power Plant, off Highway 133. The only contributing property in the district west of the river, the deteriorating ruins of the hydroelectric power plant are mainly down to its stone foundation, now covered in concrete. It is a rare early example of a power generation station.
- Redstone Inn, 82 Redstone Boulevard. Built as the dormitory for unmarried workers, this two-and-a-half-story Tudor building has a distinctive clock tower that has become as much a local landmark as the coke ovens. After falling into disuse when the mines and ovens were shut down, it was eventually restored and reused in its present purpose. It was listed on the Register in 1980.

== See also ==
- National Register of Historic Places in Pitkin County, Colorado
