= Redstone Inn =

- U.S. National Register of Historic Places
- U.S. Historic district – Contributing property
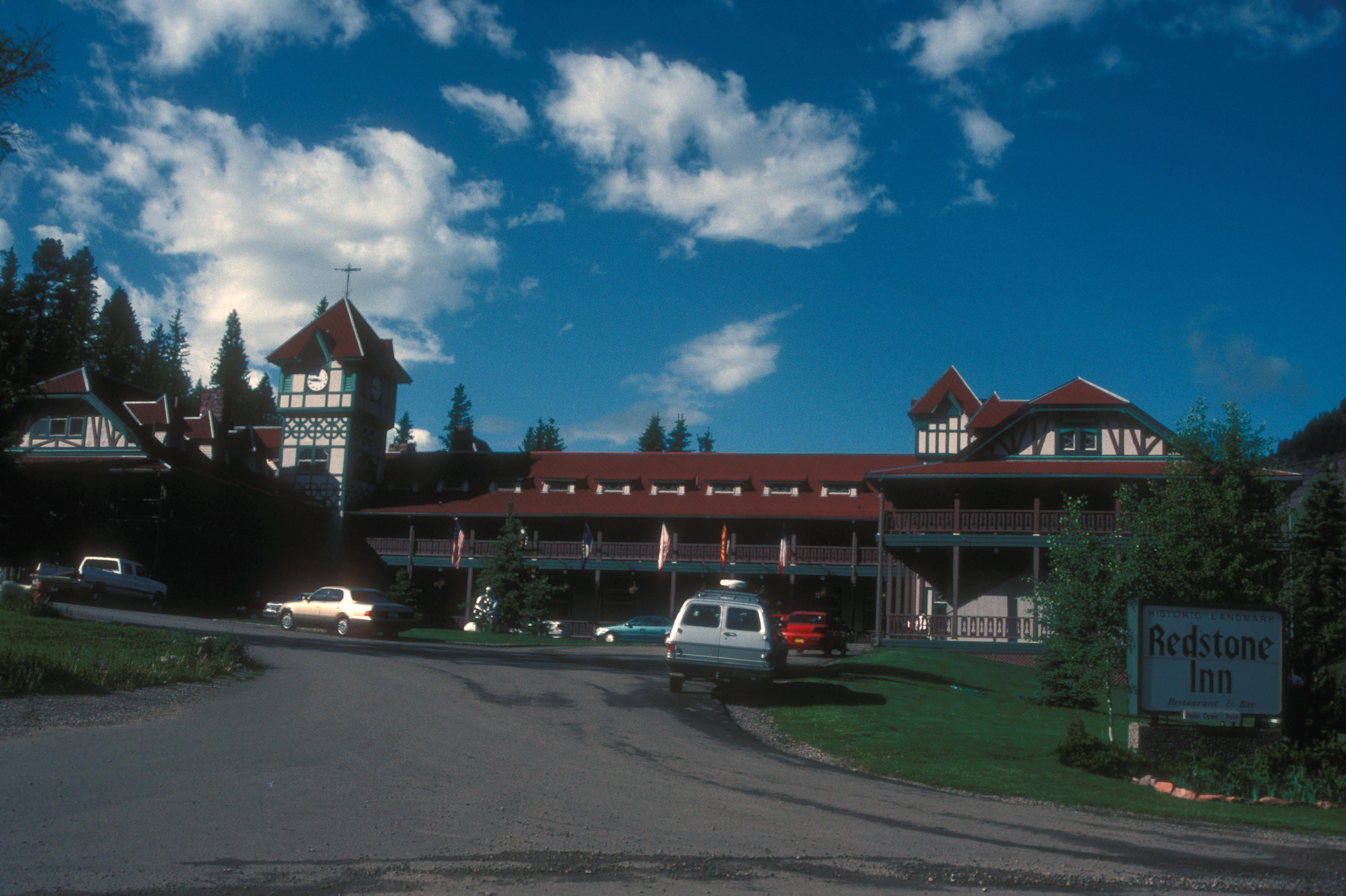
- North elevation from driveway, 2007

- Location within Colorado
- Location: Redstone, CO
- Nearest city: Aspen
- Coordinates: 39°10′48″N 107°14′22″W
- Area: 22 acres (8.9 ha)
- Built: 1902
- Architect: Theodore Boal
- Architectural style: Tudor Revival
- Part of: Redstone Historic District (ID89000934)
- MPS: Mining Industry in Colorado
- NRHP reference No.: 80000920
- Added to NRHP: March 27, 1980

The Redstone Inn is located on Redstone Boulevard in Redstone, Colorado, United States. It is a structure in the Tudor Revival architectural styles built at the beginning of the 20th century. In 1980 it was listed on the National Register of Historic Places. It is also a contributing property to the Redstone Historic District listed on the register nine years later.

When it was built, it served as a dormitory for unmarried male workers, primarily miners, at the Colorado Fuel & Iron (CF&I) company's coal mines and coking ovens nearby. It was part of the company town, with modest cottages for the miners and their families as well as a school, recreation center, firehouse and other public buildings, that CF&I president John Cleveland Osgood, had spent lavishly to create along with his nearby estate. The mines were closed in 1908, and the village nearly abandoned, the dormitory among them. Most of its original buildings were demolished or moved, but the dormitory survived, and was restored and converted to its current use in mid-century.

== Buildings and grounds ==
The 22-acre (8.9 ha) inn complex is located at the junction of Redstone and Firehouse Road just opposite the bridge over the Crystal River from State Highway 133, the main entrance to Redstone for visitors and passing traffic, just opposite the old coke ovens. It is at the southern end of the central portion of Redstone. To the north are the small surviving wood frame cottages along the two streets. Redstone Boulevard continues south, unpaved, along the east bank of the Crystal for over a mile, to Osgood Castle. On the east and west mountain slopes rise ultimately to summits above 12,000 feet (3,700 m); the land is mostly part of White River National Forest and additionally in the Maroon Bells–Snowmass Wilderness on the east.

A C-shaped driveway provides access to the front of the similarly shaped main inn building from Firehouse. It is a two-and-half–story wood-frame building on a sandstone foundation sided in stucco and wood shingle, with half-timber on the clipped gable ends. The roof is pierced by gabled dormer windows, their fronts sloped backward suggesting a pyramid, on the inside of the C's arms, and shed dormers in the middle section. A sandstone chimney rises from the east arm, and where it and the middle intersect is a clock tower that rises an additional story. Several small gabled extensions project to the south behind it, and another chimney rises above them.

On the front facade, both stories have a similar treatment, with a wooden balustrade running continuously around, allowing access to the rooms. The veranda on the second floor is supported by square full-height wooden pillars. Windows on the exposed gable ends are diamond-paned, complementing the half-timbering. The upper section of the clock tower flares outward slightly, and it is topped by a pyramidal roof with overhanging eaves pierced by small centrally located gables on each side. Inside there are 35 guest rooms of varying sizes, a restaurant, kitchen and bar, and offices. The older guest rooms have original Arts and Crafts furniture, some from designs by Gustav Stickley.

To the rear is a swimming pool surrounded by a large concrete deck. A pool house is to the south, and tennis courts are on the east. At the southeast, on the riverbank, is a small chalet with two rooms.

== History ==
In the 1880s, John Cleveland Osgood, a Brooklyn native who had worked his way west, did surveys for the state of Colorado and found many areas with quality coal. He went into the business of mining and processing it, becoming head of the merged Colorado Fuel and Iron (CF&I) company in 1892. Through it, Osgood controlled over half the state's coal, and became one of the wealthiest men in the country.

He had for many years had his eye on the coal found in the upper Crystal valley, which he had found would yield high-quality coke, useful in the manufacture of steel. Longstanding plans to develop mines in the area had to wait due to the Panic of 1893 and the economic uncertainty it created. Only just before the turn of the century were banks again willing to finance a large-scale venture.

A large part of the venture was the construction of a planned company town at Redstone, where the coke ovens were. Most miners just built crude shacks or log cabins for themselves and, if they had come along, their families, out of whatever was available. It was often unsightly, and its poor quality became an issue in labor disputes. Osgood wanted to change that.

By the end of 1899, 249 ovens, the largest coking facility in the state, had been built by contractors from Denver. They were operated by a work force that accounted for 10% of all Colorado's workers at the time. Coking workers were predominantly immigrants from Eastern Europe whom the company had recruited from the East. The miners, by contrast, were usually longtime Colorado residents who had worked in mines elsewhere.

Starting the next year, Osgood built Redstone, a project that ultimately cost $5 million ($186 million in modern dollars). Architect Theodore Boal designed cottages in styles that worked well with the mountain setting, particularly the Swiss Chalet style as advocated a half-century before by Andrew Jackson Downing in his seminal work The Architecture of Country Houses. Larger cottages with electricity and running water were built for the more senior miners and managers, and Osgood's estate south of town was the largest.

For the unmarried workers there was a 40-room dormitory at the south end of the first section of town built, just across the river from the ovens. It was described as being in the "old English style", what has since been called Tudor Revival, with half-timbering on a stucco face. The clock tower was copied from a similar one at an inn in Rotterdam, Netherlands. Inside, amenities for the residents included a barbershop, telephones and reading room as well as the electricity and water.

Such luxuries, unheard of even for management in most mountain mining camps, earned Redstone the nickname of "Ruby of the Rockies". "Could any coal camp ask more?" wrote The New York Times on a 1902 visit, marveling that the miners changed out of their dirty work clothes for dinner. At their club elsewhere in the village, the newspaper reported, compromises minimized the negative effects of drinking and gambling, two longstanding sources of social problems in remote mining communities, without the difficulties created by the attempt to enforce total bans on them. The miners were allowed to purchase alcoholic beverages only for personal consumption, thus preventing the public drunkenness that often ensued when groups of drinkers treated each other to rounds. Penny-ante poker was the only game of chance permitted. That same year, the village won an award at the St. Louis Exposition.

Due to financial problems resulting from labor stoppages at its other facilities in Colorado, Osgood lost control of CF&I to representatives of the Rockefeller and Gould families in 1903. He was less able to control the direction of Redstone, and although he started the competing Victor-American Fuel Company he spent more time back East. The mining and coking continued until 1909, when it became unprofitable to ship coal and coke from the mines to the company's new steel mill in Pueblo. Redstone's inhabitants left very quickly, with barely a dozen remaining to keep it from becoming a ghost town. The dormitory was abandoned and fell into neglect.

Over the next several decades, many of the Redstone buildings were moved or demolished. Osgood returned in his dying years, hoping to re-open his estate as a resort, but the Depression prevented that from happening. In the early 1940s many of the other larger buildings of Redstone, such as its school, firehouse and its two lodges, were dismantled for scrap metal needed to fight World War II.

After the war, coal mining and coking returned to Redstone, on a smaller scale, in the early 1950s. The dormitory was restored and reopened as an inn. In the process, it was expanded slightly on the west in a style sympathetic to the original. Some new rooms, referred to as the terrace rooms, were added.

== Rates and services ==
The inn is open year-round. Room rates vary from $99 for a vintage style room to over $200 for a suite, rates that compare favorably with those charged by lodging in the nearby Aspen area. The small single room in the clock tower may be rented for $85. Pets are allowed to stay in the terrace rooms for an additional $20 per pet per night, and may be left alone in the room; however the hotel's housekeeping staff will not enter a room with a dog alone.

Rooms are equipped with flat-screen TVs and most have DVD players. All rooms have satellite TV. The inn has wireless Internet available throughout the hotel, complemented by a business center located on the main floor in the library. Irons and ironing boards are available on request. There is no elevator.

A free continental breakfast is offered mornings in the winter and early spring. The inn's bar and grill serves lunch daily, both inside and at poolside (in the summer months). The Dining Room is available Friday and Saturday nights in the winter months and nightly in the summer months.

The inn offers other tourism services offsite. It coordinates tours of the Redstone Castle. It also hosts destination weddings.

== Reviews ==
In addition to the location, travel writers staying at the Redstone have complimented its period furniture and interior decoration, calling it "striking." "I love old Arts and Crafts-style lodges in remote locations", says Nicholas Trotter in Colorado & The Rockies For Dummies, "and the Redstone Inn may be my favorite anywhere." "The rooms are by no means opulent, if opulence is what you're looking for," agrees Evelyn Spence in the Explorer's Club guide Colorado's Classic Mountain Towns: A Great Destination, "but the Stickley–Roycroft period furniture, antiques and outdated wallpaper seem to go together swimmingly."

== See also ==
- List of hotels in the United States
- National Register of Historic Places listings in Pitkin County, Colorado
