= East Fork South Fork Crystal River =

Physical characteristics
- Source
  - coordinates: 39°02′05″N 107°00′04″W
- Mouth
  - location: Confluence with Rock Creek
  - coordinates: 39°01′26″N 107°03′09″W
  - elevation: 10,397 ft (3,169 m)

Basin features
- Progression: South Fork—Crystal; Roaring Fork—Colorado

East Fork South Fork Crystal River is a tributary of the South Fork Crystal River in Gunnison County, Colorado. The stream's source is on the west side of West Maroon Peak in the Maroon Bells-Snowmass Wilderness. It flows west to a confluence with Rock Creek in the White River National Forest that forms the South Fork Crystal River.

== See also ==
- List of rivers of Colorado
