= Town Mill =

Town Mill is the name of a number of mills in the United Kingdom.

== Windmills ==
In the United Kingdom

- Town Mill, Biddenden, a windmill in Kent
- Town Mill, Bluntisham, a windmill in Cambridgeshire
- Town Mill, Margate, a windmill in Margate, Kent
- Town Mill, Sandwich, a windmill in Sandwich, Kent
- Town Mill, Shoreham, a windmill in West Sussex
- Town Mill, Southwold, a windmill in Suffolk
- Town Mill, Sutton Valence, a windmill in Kent
- Town Mill, Swindon, a windmill in Wiltshire

In the United States

- Town Mill, Edgartown, a windmill in Massachusetts

== Watermills ==
- Town Mill, Edenbridge, on the River Eden, Kent
- Town Mill, Guildford, on the River Wey, Surrey
- Town Mill, King's Lynn, on the Gaywood River, Norfolk
- Town Mill, Lyme Regis, on the River Lym, Dorset
- Town Mill, Mansfield, on the River Maun, Nottinghamshire
- Town Mill, Partick, on the Molendinar Burn, Dunbartonshire
- Town Mill, Sheffield, on the River Sheaf, Yorkshire
- Town Mill, Tonbridge, on the River Medway, Kent
- Town Mill, Whitchurch, on the River Test, Hampshire
