= South Fork Crystal River =

Physical characteristics
- Source
  - coordinates: 39°01′25″N 107°03′07″W
- Mouth
  - location: Confluence with North Fork
  - coordinates: 39°03′33″N 107°06′14″W
  - elevation: 8,894 ft (2,711 m)

Basin features
- Progression: Crystal—Roaring Fork; Colorado

South Fork Crystal River is a tributary of the Crystal River in Gunnison County, Colorado, United States. The stream's source is the confluence of Rock Creek and the East Fork in the White River National Forest. It flows through Crystal Canyon to a confluence with the North Fork Crystal River that forms the Crystal River.

== See also ==
- List of rivers of Colorado
