= Old Mill School =

Old Mill School may refer to:

- Old Mill School (Mill Valley, California)
- Old Mill School, a public school in Sea Girt, New Jersey
- Old Mill High School, a public high school in Millersville, Maryland

== See also ==
- Old Mill (disambiguation)
