= Old Dutch Mill =

Old Dutch Mill may refer to:

- Old Dutch Mill, Barrington, a windmill in Illinois
- Old Dutch Mill, Chicago, a windmill in Illinois
- Old Dutch Mill, Elmhurst, a windmill in Illinois
- Fabyan Windmill or Old Dutch Mill, Geneva, a windmill in Illinois
- Old Dutch Mill, Schiller Park, a windmill in Illinois
- Old Dutch Mill, Smith Center, a windmill in Arizona
- Old Dutch Mill, Wamego, a windmill in Arizona
