= Crystal Mill =

- U.S. National Register of Historic Places
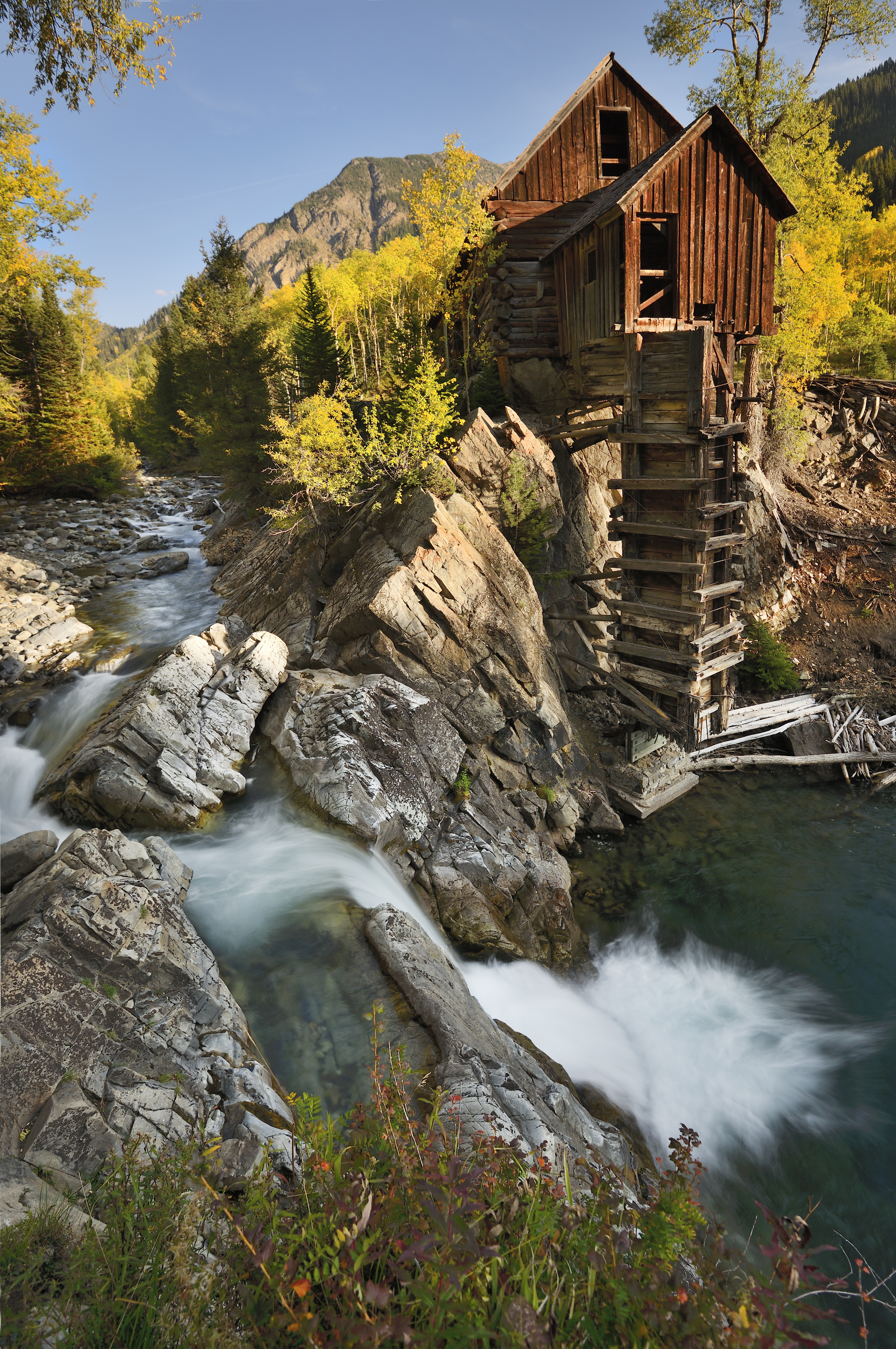

- Location within Colorado Location within the United States
- Nearest city: Crystal, Colorado
- Coordinates: 39°3′32″N 107°6′14″W
- Area: less than one acre
- NRHP reference No.: 85001493
- Added to NRHP: July 05, 1985

The Crystal Mill, or the Old Mill is an 1892 wooden powerhouse located on an outcrop above the Crystal River in Crystal, Colorado, United States. It is accessible from Marble, Colorado via four-wheel drive. Although called a Watermill, it is more correctly denoted as a compressor station, which used a water turbine to drive an air compressor, and was originally built with a horizontal wheel. The compressed air was then used to power other machinery or tools.

== Names ==
In the 21st century, the mill is usually called the Crystal Mill or the Old Crystal Mill. Many decades ago, when the mill was still in use, it was called the Sheep Mountain Power House at the Lost Horse Millsite, or simply the Lost Horse Mill. The building is built on a mining claim named "Lost Horse". The site is referred to as a "mill" because there was a 3-stamp mill for crushing ore, in a building directly adjacent to the south of the surviving structure.

== History ==
The mill was constructed in 1893 by George C. Eaton and B.S. Phillips, promoters of the Sheep Mountain Tunnel and Mining Company. It was built as a power plant for the Sheep Mountain Tunnel. Originally it had a horizontal waterwheel that generated compressed air for miners in the nearby silver mines. It fell into disuse in 1917 when the Sheep Mountain Tunnel mine closed. The mill was placed on the National Register of Historic Places on July 5, 1985.

== See also ==
- National Register of Historic Places listings in Gunnison County, Colorado

== Gallery ==
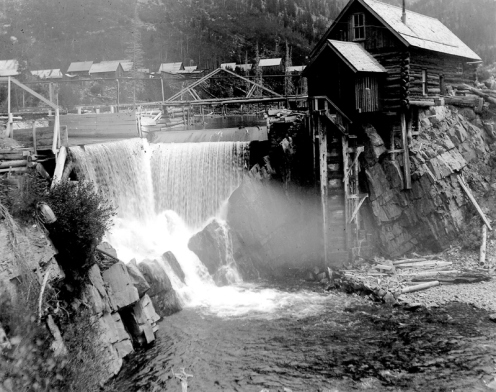
The Crystal Mill in operation, 1890s

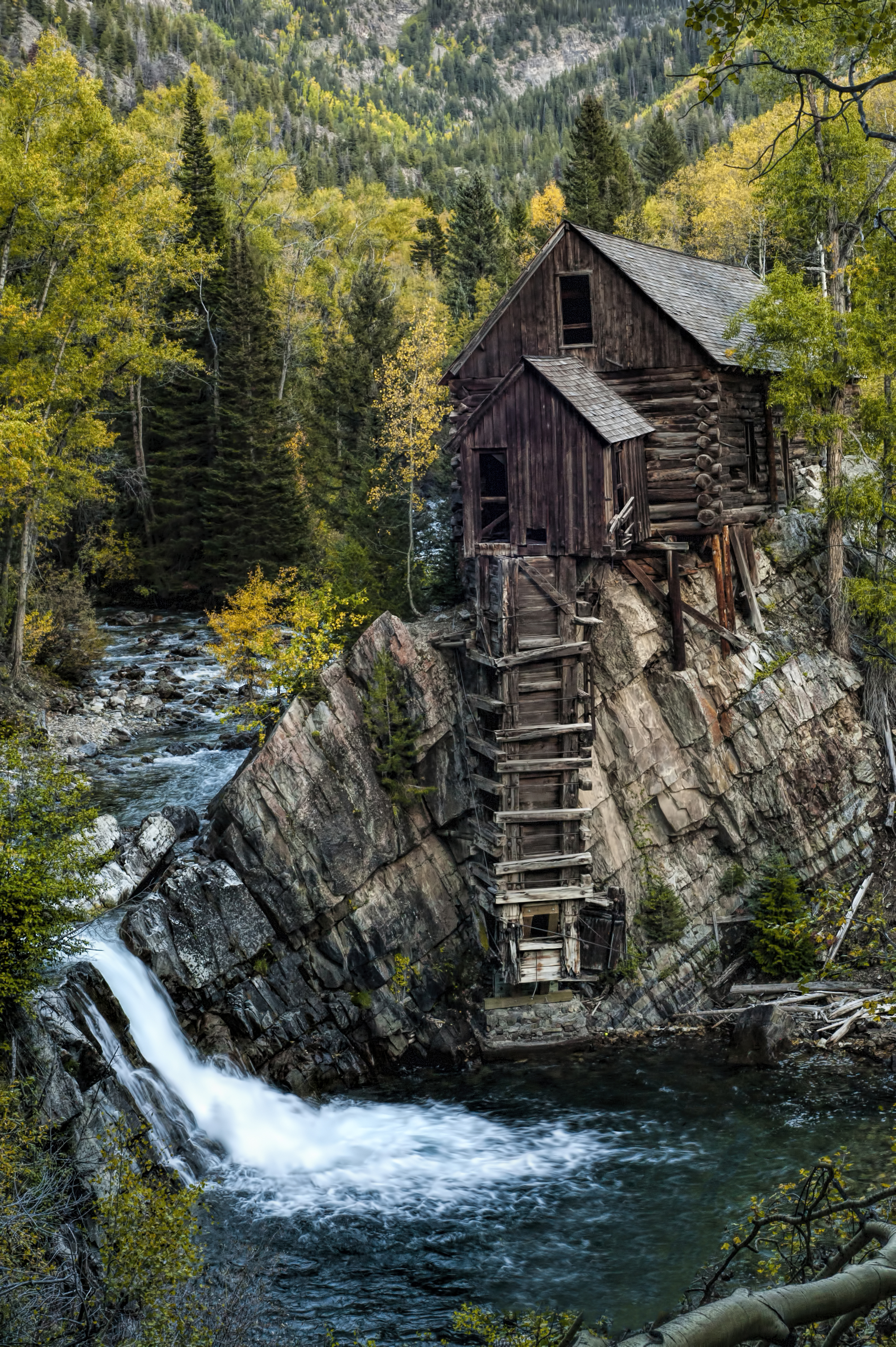
Another view of the mill

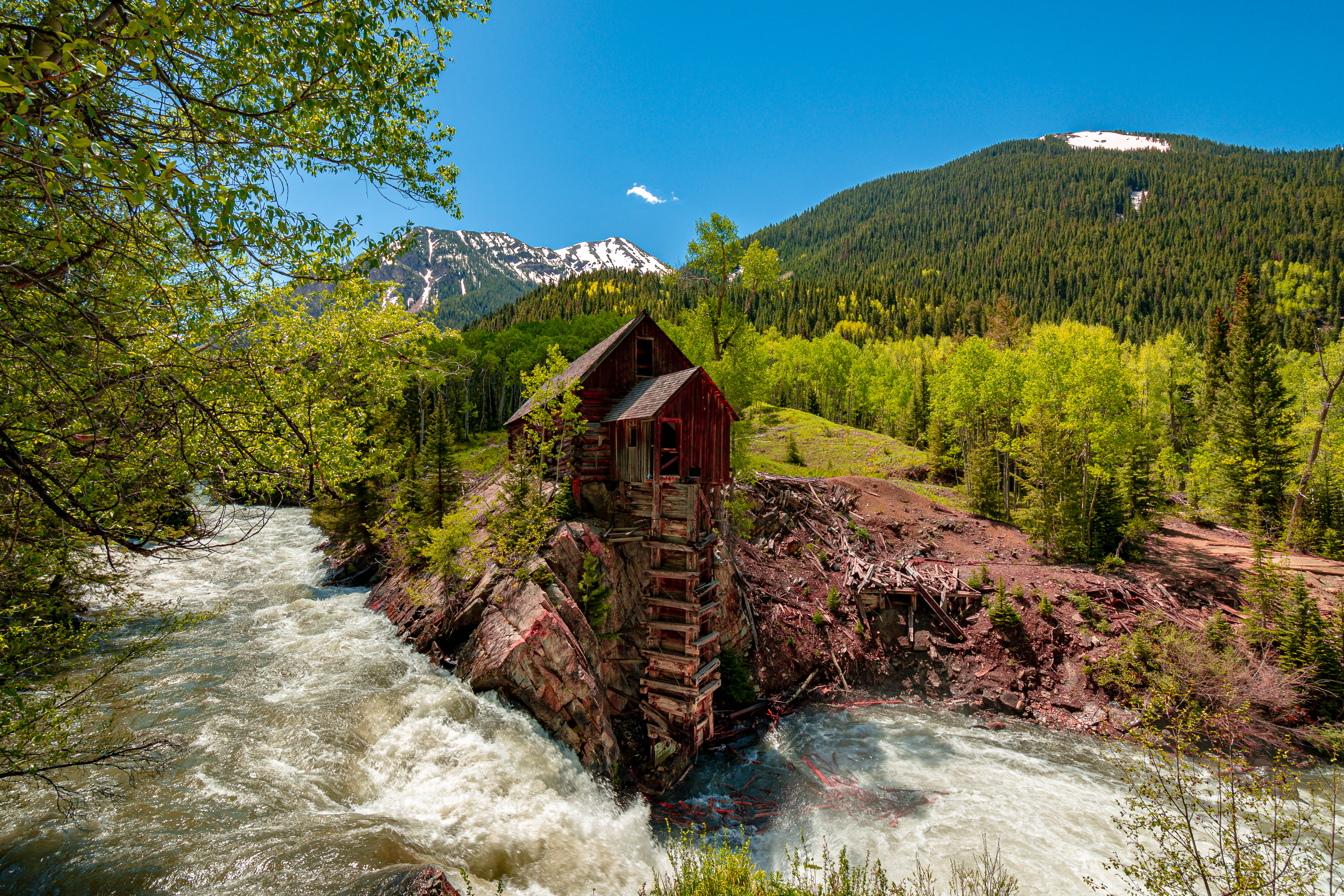
The Crystal Mill 2014
