= North Fork Crystal River =

Physical characteristics
- Source
  - coordinates: 39°02′58″N 107°00′11″W
- Mouth
  - location: Confluence with South Fork
  - coordinates: 39°03′33″N 107°06′14″W
  - elevation: 8,894 ft (2,711 m)

Basin features
- Progression: Crystal—Roaring Fork; Colorado

North Fork Crystal River is a tributary of the Crystal River in Gunnison County, Colorado. The stream flows from a source in the Maroon Bells-Snowmass Wilderness to a confluence with the South Fork Crystal River in the White River National Forest that forms the Crystal River. Class VI rapids not usually run, do not attempt to run at peak or high flows. Short but very continuous whitewater.

== See also ==
- List of rivers of Colorado
