= List of windmills in Massachusetts =

This is a list of traditional windmills in the American state of Massachusetts.

Check out the locations in linked "map all coordinates using OpenSourcMap":

== Mills ==
Known building dates are in bold text. Non-bold text denotes first known date. Iron windpumps are outside the scope of this list unless listed on the National Register of Historic Places.

Location	Name of mill and coordinates	Type	Built	Notes	Photograph
Barnstable			**1687**		
Barnstable			**1785**		
Beverly	Chipman's Tannery	Vertical axis mill	1795		
Bourne	Joe Jefferson's Mill	Smock	**1889**	Moved within Bourne, 1971	
Bourne; 41.74104°N 70.60430°W	Aptucxet Trading Post Museum Mill	Smock	**1971**	Windmill World Replica	
Boston	Copp's Mill		**1632**	Standing 1659	
Boston	Copp's Hill Mill	Smock		Moved to Salem, 1773	
Boston	Windmill Point		1636		
Boston	Windmill Point (2nd mill)		1650		
Boston	Windmill Point (3rd mill)		1650	1822	
Boston	Windmill Point (4th mill)		1650	1824	
Boston	Windmill Point (5th mill?)	Tower	1833		
Boston	Widow Tuthill's Mill		1642		
Boston	South Mill		1643	1644	
Boston	Windmill Hill		**1636**		
Brewster	Ellis Landing Road Mill	Smock	**1795**	Moved within Brewster unknown date	
Brewster		Smock	1845	Moved within Brewster 1890	
Brewster		Smock	**1890**	Moved within Brewster 1974	
Brewster	**Old Higgins Farm Mill**; 41°45′08″N 70°07′16″W	Smock	**1974**	Windmill World	
Brewster	Golf course			Windmill World	
Brockton			**1781**		
Brockton	West Falmouth Mill	Smock	**1922**	Burned down, unknown date	
Buzzards Bay	**Beach House Mill**	Smock		Windmill World	
Cataumet	Red Brook Mill	Smock	**1853**	Moved within Cataumet 1850s	
Cataumet	Red Brook Mill	Smock	1850s	Moved within Cataumet 1905	
Cataumet	**Red Brook Mill**	Smock	**1905**		
Cataumet	**Rothery Mill**	Smock	**1900**		
Cataumet	**Rothery Mill** (2nd mill)	Smock	Early 1900s		
Chatham	**Chatham Windmill**; 41°40′34″N 69°57′33″W	**1797**		Windmill World	
Chatham		Smock	**1820**	Moved within Chatham 1911	
Chatham	**Sur Mer Mill**	Smock	**1911**	Windmill World	
Chatham	Chatham Bars Inn Mill	Smock	c. 1730	Moved to South Orleans 1830	
Chatham	Benjamin Godfrey Mill, Mill Hill	Smock	**1797**	Moved within Chatham 1956	
Chatham	**Benjamin Godfrey Mill**	Smock	**1956**		
Chatham	Dolphin Inn Mill	Smock	1980s		
Chatham	Robert Horne Mill	Smock	1920s		
Chilmark	Elmer Bliss Mill	Smock	**1938**		
Dennis	Uncle Rufus Howes' Mill; South Mill		Late 18th century	Demolished 1874	
Dennis Port	Reuben Burgess Mill	Smock		Burned down unknown date, gone by 1885.	
East Dennis	Hatsel Kelly Mill		**1775**	Struck by lightning and burnt down 1869.	
Eastham			**1660**		
Eastham	Kaskaogansett Mill		**1682**		
Eastham	Eastham Mill	Smock	**1793**	Moved within Eastham, 1808	
Eastham	**Eastham Mill**	Smock	**1808**	Windmill World	
East Orleans	Old Mill	Smock	**1800**	Moved to Sandwich 1819	
Edgartown	Town Mill				
Edgartown	(three other mills)				
Fairhaven	Macomber Mill	Smock	**1821**	Moved to Cataumet 1853	
Falmouth	**Old Emmon's Estate Mill**			Windmill World	
Fall River		Smock		Moved from Warren, Rhode Island. Moved to Portsmouth, Rhode Island at unknown date.	
Fall River		smock		Moved from Bristol, Rhode Island. Moved to Tiverton, Rhode Island at unknown date.	
Fall River	Littlefield Mill	Smock	1815	Moved to Block Island, Rhode Island, unknown date. Gone by 1877	
Harwichport	SW side of South St	Smock	**1792**	Moved to NE side of South St at unknown date	
Harwichport	NE side of South St	Smock		Moved to Wychmere Harbor 1890s	
Harwichport	Wychmere Harbor (north site)	Smock	1890s	Moved within Wychmere Harbor 1900s	
Harwichport	Wychmere Harbour (south site)	Smock	1900s	Moved a short distance (50 feet (15 m)) early 1940s	
Harwichport	**John Smith Mill**	Smock	Early 1940s		
Hyannisport	Jonathan Young Mill	Smock	**1897**	Moved to Orleans 1983; Windmill World Contradictory info: Originally constructed in 1798 and located at Kendrick's Hill, East Orleans, it was moved multiple times over its life, but at has been at this location since 1983. 33 Route 6A, Orleans, MA.	
Hyannisport	Landmark Tower, Holbrook Tower "Windmill", Hyannisport "Lighthouse", “Salt Shaker”, water tower	Smock	**1911**		
Hyannisport	Wright Mill	Smock	c. 1900		
Ipswich	Windmill Hill Mill		1667		
Marblehead	Rhodes Hill Mill		**1678**	1681	
Marblehead	Saltworks (two mills)		1804	One blown down October 1804	
Marblehead	Goodwin Mill		**1819**		
Marstons Mills	Cape Cod Airfield Mill	Smock	1950s		
Martha's Vineyard	Lothrop Merry's Mill; Tisbury Mill	Smock	1815	Moved within Martha's Vineyard 1842	
Martha's Vineyard	Lothrop Merry's Mill; Tisbury Mill	Smock	**1842**	Moved with Martha's Vineyard 1888	
Martha's Vineyard	**Lothrop Merry's Mill**; **Tisbury Mill**	Smock	**1888**		
Martha's Vineyard	Timothy Chase Mill		18th century	Collapsed 1818	
Martha's Vineyard	Tailer Mill	Post	**1985**	Moved to Etzikom, Alberta, Canada 1995.	
Nantucket	Frederick Macy Mill, Mill Hill	Post	**1723**	Demolished 7 December 1837	
Nantucket	Mill Hill (2nd mill)	Post	1810		
Nantucket	Mill Hill (3rd mill)	Post	1810		
Nantucket	Mill Hill (4th mill)	Post	1810		
Nantucket	**The Old Mill**	Smock	**1746**	Nantucket Historical Association	
Newbury			1703	1774	
Newbury	Saltworks		c. 1784		
Orleans	Jonathan Young Mill	Smock	**1839**	Moved to Hyannisport 1897. Windmill World	
Orleans	**Jonathan Young Mill**	Smock	**1983**	Windmill World	
Osterville	Le Petit Moulin	Smock	1950s		
Osterville	Oyster Harbours Mill	Smock	**1925**		
Plymouth	Plimoth Mill	Smock	**1680**	Moved to Truro, 1770	
Provincetown	Salt works (six mills)			Windmill World	
Sagamore	**Christmas Tree Shop Mill**	Smock	**1983**	At the eastern base of the Sagamore Bridge and attached to the Christmas Tree Shop	
Salem	near the burial ground		**1637**		
Salem			**1733**	1771	
Salem	East Street Bark Mill		**1794**ref name=New/>		
Sandwich	**Heritage Plantation Mill**	Smock		Windmill World	
Sandwich	Old Mill	Smock	**1819**	Moved within Sandwich 1957	
Sandwich	**Old Mill**	Smock	**1957**		
South Chatham	Seth Bearse Mill		c. 1850		
South Dartmouth	**Chase Mill**	Smock	**1924**		
South Dennis		Smock	**1791**	Moved to West Dennis	
South Orleans	Captain Arey's Mill	Smock	**1830**	Moved within South Orleans 1870	
South Orleans	Center Mill; Captain Arey's Mill	Smock	**1830**	Moved to Cataumet 1900	
South Orleans	East Mill				
South Orleans	Kenrick's Hill	Smock	Mid-18th century	Moved to Orleans 1839	
South Yarmouth	Farris Mill	Smock	1750s	Moved to Indian Town 1782	
South Yarmouth	Judah Baker Mill	Smock	**1866**	Moved within South Yarmouth, 1875	
South Yarmouth	Judah Baker Mill	Smock	**1875**	Moved within South Yarmouth 1916	
South Yarmouth	Judah Baker Mill	Smock	**1916**	Moved to Yarmouth 1953	
Swansea	Potter's Mill			Standing 1931	
Truro	near the Highland Light		**1711**		
Truro	Truro Mill	Smock	**1770**	Moved to Eastham, 1793	
Truro	**Castle Hill Mill**	Smock			
Truro	Truro Highlands Mill	Smock	Early 19th century		
Watertown				Moved to Boston 1632	
Wellfleet	David Baker Mill				
Wellfleet	Thomas Higgins Mill				
Wellfleet	Freeman's Mill				
Wellfleet	Samuel Chipman's Mill				
Wellfleet	Ryder Mill	Smock	**1838**	Moved within Wellfleet 1870	
Wellfleet	**Morning Glory Mill**	Smock	**1870**		
Wellfleet	Wellfleet Harbor		**1978**		
West Dennis	Kelley's Pond Mill	Smock		Moved to South Yarmouth 1866	
West Falmouth	Bowerman Mill	Smock	**1787**	Moved to Brockton, 1922	
West Harwich		Smock		Moved to Cataumet early 1900s	
West Harwich	The Windmill House Mill	Smock	1920s		
West Yarmouth	Farris Mill	Smock	**1782**	Moved to Ford Museum, Dearborn, Michigan 1935	
Yarmouth	Sautucket Mill		**1661**		
Yarmouth			c. 1687		
Yarmouth	**Judah Baker Mill**	Smock	**1953**	Windmill World	
Yarmouth			**1766**	Moved to East Dennis 1775	
unknown location (north side of Cape Cod)		Smock	Mid-17th century	Moved to South Yarmouth 1750s	

== Sources ==
- Lombardo, Donald (2003). Windmills of New England, Their Genius, Madness, History & Future. Cape Cod, MA: On Cape Publications. ISBN 0-9719547-7-1.
