= The Old Windmill =

Public house in Coventry, England

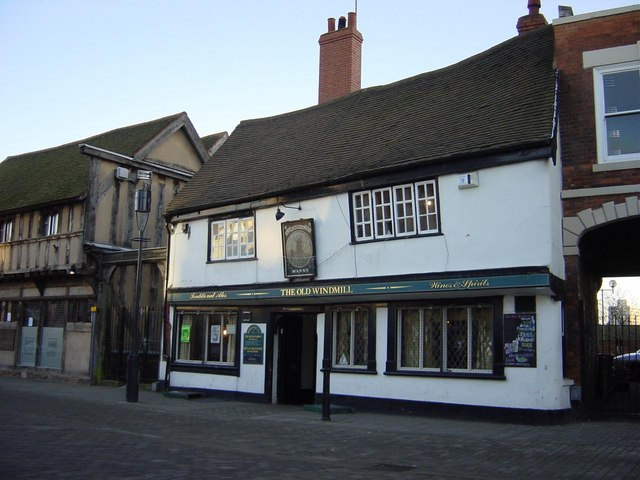
- In 2003
- Interactive map of the The Old Windmill area
- Former names: The Windmill, Ma Brown's

General information
- Location: 21 Spon Street, Coventry, England
- Coordinates: 52.40827°N 1.51791°W

Website
- www.facebook.com/TheOldWindmill.Coventry

The Old Windmill is a public house in Spon Street in Coventry, England. It is a Grade II Listed, 15th-century building with a history going back to around 1451 when it constructed around the trunk of a tree.

== Name ==
The inn was originally called The Windmill after a real windmill on Spon Causeway by the River Sherbourne. Another inn with the same name was at number 105–6 Spon Street and so, in 1836, this inn was renamed The Old Windmill to distinguish it. The other inn closed in 1970.

The publicans were members of the Brown family from 1931 to 1975. Ann Brown was the licensee from 1940 to 1967 and so the place became known as Ma Brown's.

== Features ==
The inn was constructed in 1451. One original feature is the hearth of the fireplace which conceals a priest's hole.

The pub had its own brewery at the rear which was used until 1930 and is still preserved as a display.

It was renovated in 1985, expanding the bar area to incorporate an open courtyard and a room which was previously used as a toyshop.

The building has been Grade II listed since June 1974.
