= Judah Baker Windmill =

18th-century windmill in South Yarmouth, Massachusetts, United States

Coordinates: 41°39′17″N 70°11′48″W

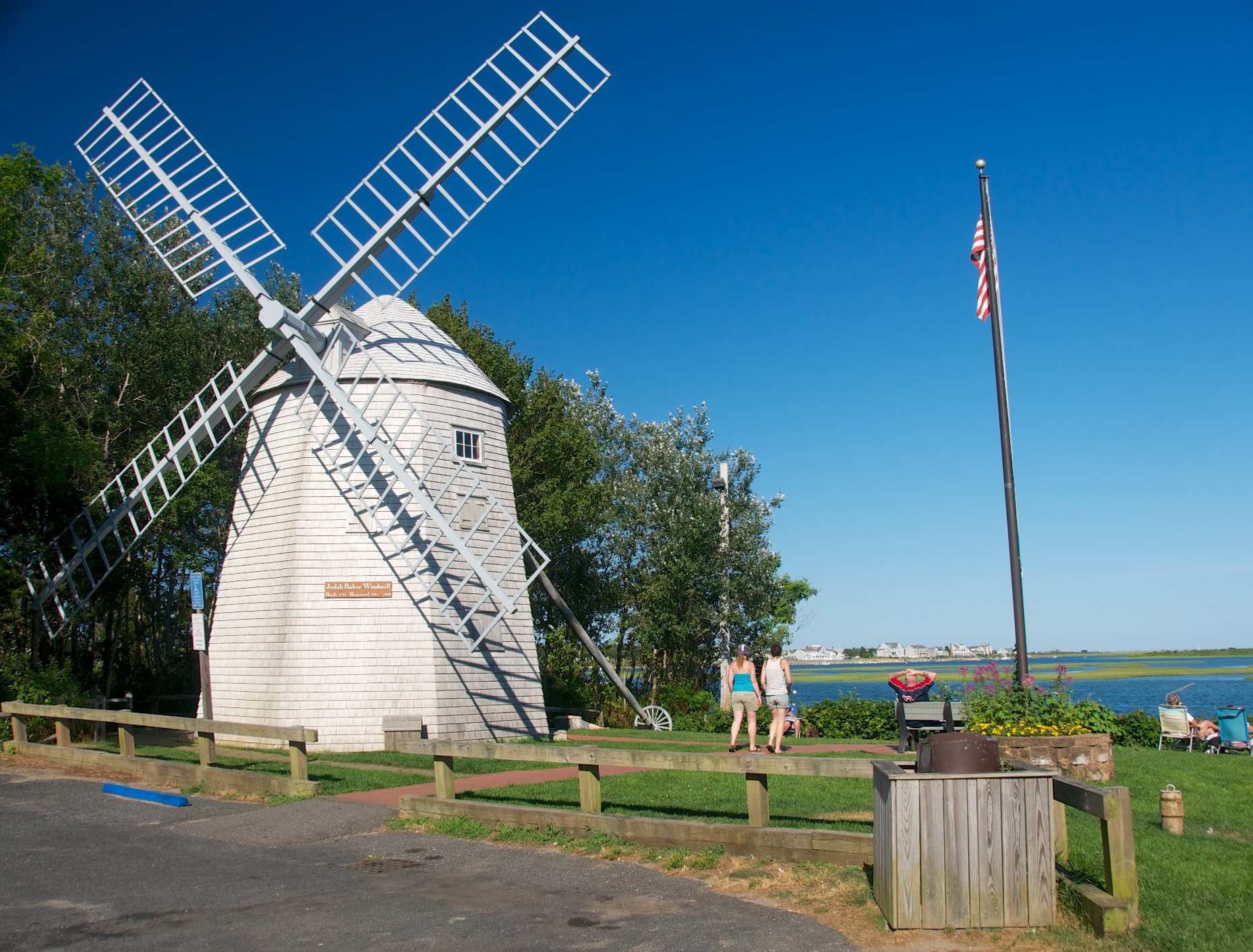
Judah Baker Windmill

The Judah Baker Windmill is an 18th-century windmill in South Yarmouth, Massachusetts. It was named after its original builder, Judah Baker, who constructed the mill in 1791. Like many Cape Cod windmills, the windmill experienced several moves before moving to its current location at 89 River Street in Bass River, located within the Historic District of South Yarmouth.

The windmill faces west to Bass River, adjacent to the waters of Nantucket Sound, and is located on an area with a small boardwalk and beach.

== History ==
Judah Baker built his windmill in 1791 at Grand Cove in North Dennis, Massachusetts to grind corn. The original structure had a cone-shaped roof and two dormers, one dormer that was for the mast and power shaft, and the other dormer was for the tail pole. The windmill was then sold to Captain Freeman Crowell and moved to East Dennis, Massachusetts. In 1886, the windmill was then moved by Captain Braddock Matthews to South Yarmouth. Seth Baker bought the windmill from Captain Matthews in 1875. Seth operated the windmill until his death in 1891. Seth's son Joseph sold the mill in 1893 to William Stone. The mill no longer operated. A storm in 1916 damaged the mill. Charles Henry Davis assumed the guardianship of the mill and he moved it down the street to its present location. A deal was made in 1953 where the Town of Yarmouth took over the responsibility of the windmill.

== Restoration ==
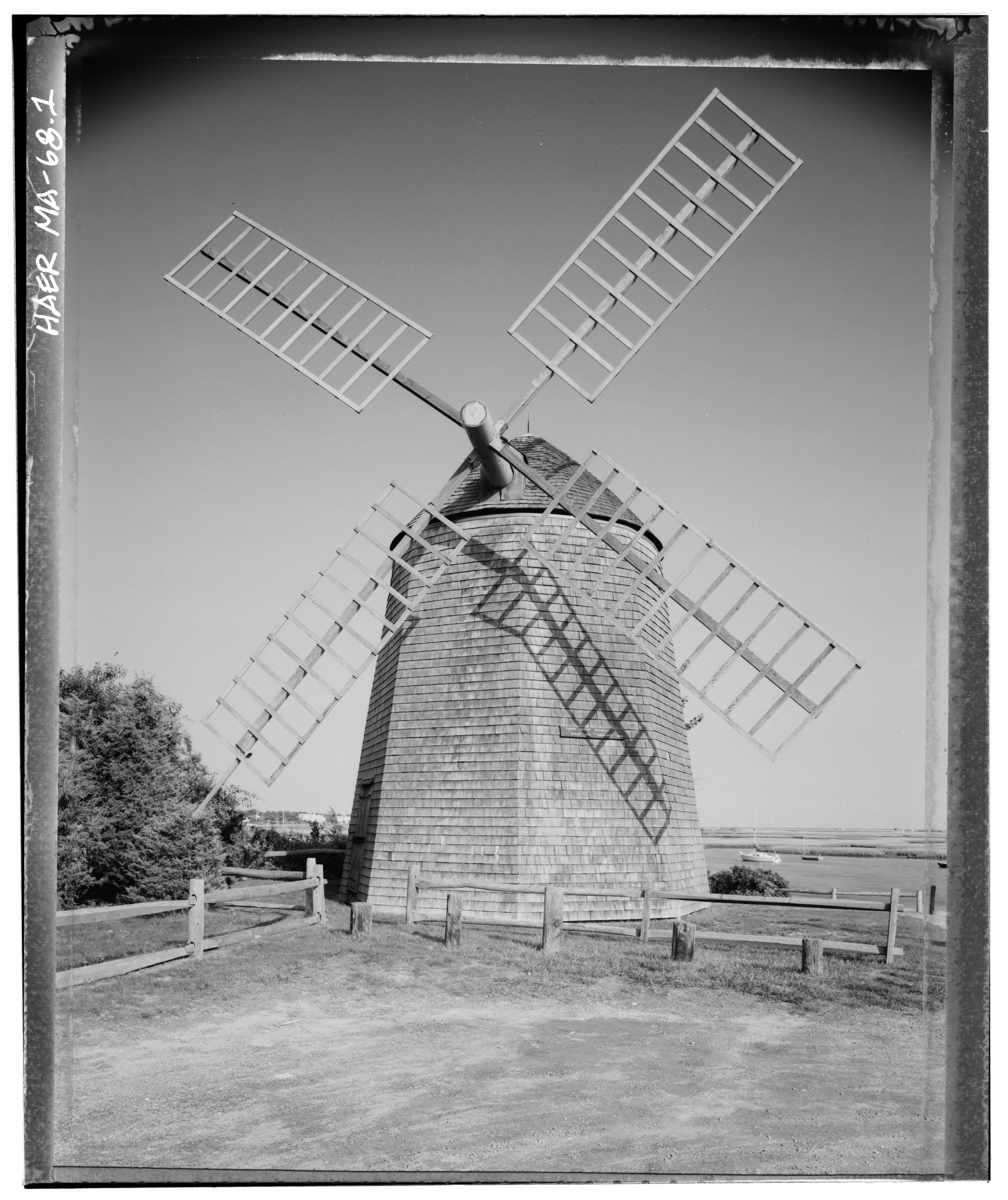

Judah Baker Windmill was completely restored both in 1973 and 1999. The interior structure, the shake shingles, the cupola, the mast and the tail pole were all rebuilt, replaced and restored. The mill was authentically rebuilt and restored using hand-hewn lumber where possible. The interior has the original mechanical equipment that the wind powered and stones that ground the grain.

In 2003, the exterior wooden shingles have been restored.

Today the mill has been authentically rebuilt and restored and still contains the original mechanical equipment. The equipment dates back to its original building at over 224 years old.

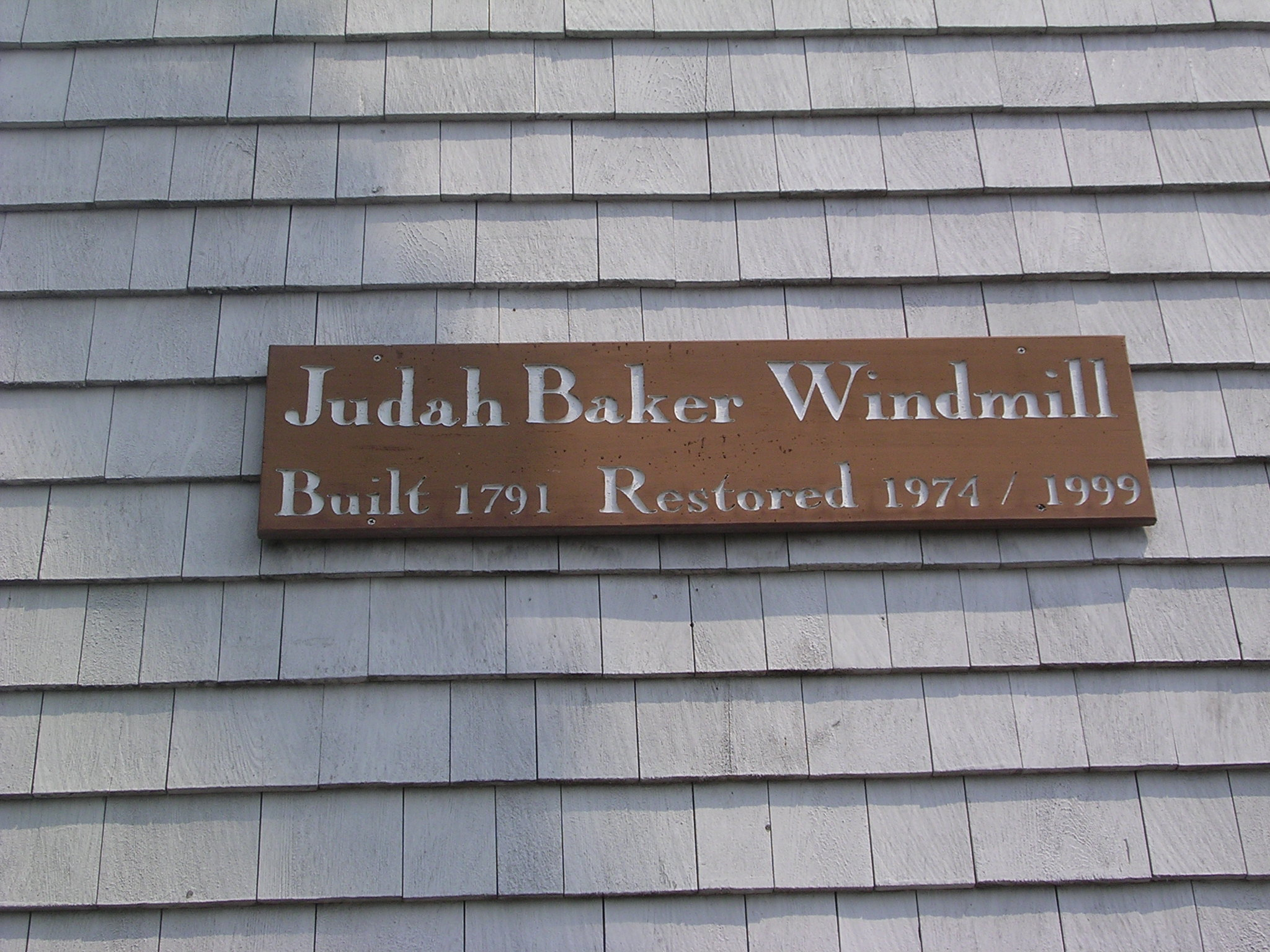

== Management ==
Today the Judah Baker Windmill is managed by volunteers and the Town of Yarmouth. Tours of the windmill are given seasonally to the public.
