= Crystal, Gunnison County, Colorado =

Ghost town in Colorado, US

Crystal, Colorado
- Ghost town
- The Crystal Club building, 2015

- Location of Crystal, Colorado. Crystal (Colorado)
- Coordinates: 39.0592°N 107.1012°W
- Country: United States
- State: Colorado
- County: Gunnison
- Elevation: 8,951 ft (2,728 m)
- Time zone: UTC−07:00 (MST)
  - Summer (DST): UTC−06:00 (MDT)
- ZIP code: Carbondale 81623
- Area codes: 970/748
- GNIS place ID: 175564

Crystal (also known as Crystal City) is a ghost town on the upper Crystal River in Gunnison County, Colorado, United States. It is located in the Elk Mountains along a four-wheel-drive road 6 miles (9.7 km) east of Marble and 20 miles (32 km) northwest of Crested Butte. Crystal was a mining camp established in 1881 and after several decades of robust existence, was all but abandoned by 1917. Many buildings still stand in Crystal, but its few residents live there only in the summer.

== History ==
In 1874, geologist Sylvester Richardson discovered promising deposits of silver near the confluence of the North Fork and South Fork of the Crystal River in Gunnison County. In the years that followed, the aboriginal Ute people were removed from the area and prospectors began mining operations, creating a new mining camp in 1880. A year later, on August 6, 1881, the Gunnison County court held a session and voted for the incorporation of Crystal City, made official as of June 8, 1881. The Crystal, Colorado, post office operated from July 28, 1882, until October 31, 1909. The Carbondale, Colorado, post office (ZIP code 81623) now serves the area. At the height of its prosperity in the mid-1880s, Crystal had over 500 residents, a post office, a newspaper (the Crystal River Current, succeeded by The Silver Lance), a pool hall, the Crystal Club (a popular and exclusive men's club), a barber shop, saloons and hotels.

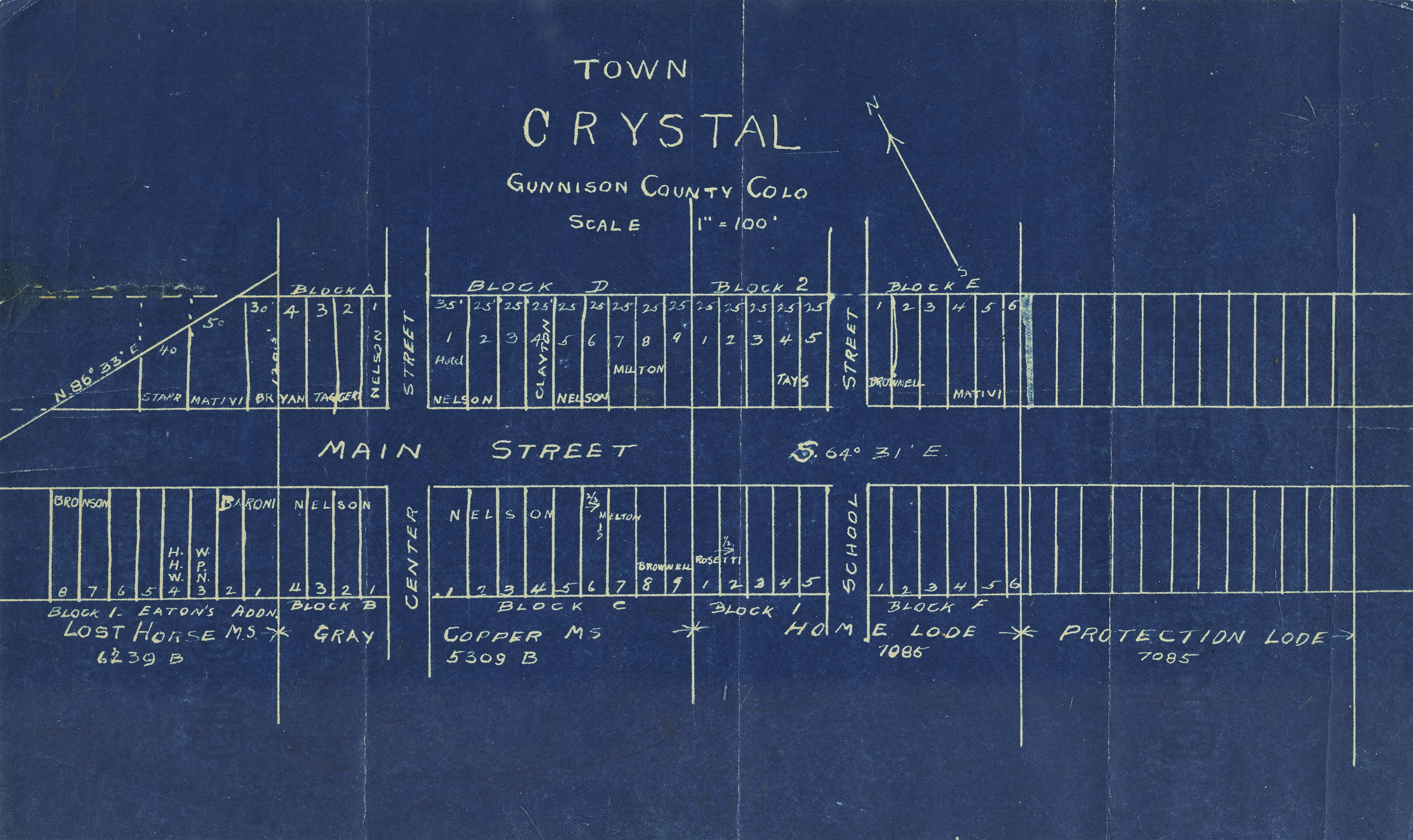
Town of Crystal, Gunnison County Colo. Shows street names, lot numbers, and family names, and mining claims, between about 1880 and 1917.

During the 1880s and 1890s, when miners began to inhabit Crystal and the surrounding area, fire was used to clear the land in order to begin mining. Thousands of acres were set ablaze, removing old growth trees and altering the pattern of vegetation in the area. This allowed several mines near Crystal to become productive, the Black Queen, Lead King, and Sheep Mountain Tunnel amongst the largest. Silver, lead and zinc were the primary metals produced, but getting the ore out of the valley was a constant problem. The nearest rail stations were in Crested Butte and Carbondale, Colorado, 20 miles (32 km) and 34 miles (55 km) distant. The routes out of Crystal were, in places, not much more than a trail. While work to improve the paths continued years after the establishment of Crystal, the routes never became better than narrow wagon trails during the years the mines shipped ore. Thus, most ore was taken to the rail stations by "jack train", each pulled by as many as a hundred mules.

The remoteness of Crystal hindered its success. Transporting ore to the depots in Crested Butte and Carbondale (via Marble) and bringing of basic necessities and mail into Crystal were a challenge in the snow-free months and difficult or impossible during the winter. Deep snow and late-lying snow drifts were hindrances and avalanches, rock slides, and wet, slick ledge roads were dangerous and sometimes deadly. Transportation difficulties cut into profits and by 1889 Crystal was in decline with the winter population being less than 100.

Despite the silver panic of 1893, while many other mines throughout the country were shutting down, Crystal still supported multiple mining operations. Indeed, that same year, the historic Crystal Mill was built by George C. Eaton and B.S. Phillips. The two men were promoters of the Sheep Mountain Tunnel and Mining Company, and the building, then known as the Sheep Mountain Tunnel Mill, was built to supply power to that and surrounding mines. Water from the Crystal River was dammed and used to provide electricity for air drills and ventilation for miners. The powerhouse used the flow of the Crystal River to power an air compressor, and the compressed air was piped to the mines to run pneumatic drills. This system was so efficient that soon after, a stamp mill was built to crush and concentrate the silver ore for shipping. This innovation saved the mining operations for a few years, but Crystal continued to decline and soon the population had dwindled to just eight inhabitants by 1915. In 1917, the mines and the Sheep Mountain powerhouse were closed, and Crystal was largely vacated.

In 1938, many years after Crystal had been abandoned, Emmet Shaw Gould of Aspen, Colorado, traveled to Crystal searching for ore to run through a recently purchased mill. He bought several mining claims along with the city lots with the cabins still standing. The area stayed in his possession, though it was never again became profitable through mining. Eventually, ownership was transferred to one of Gould's daughters, Dorothy Tidwell of Treasure Mountain Ranch, Inc. In 1985, during Tidwell's ownership, Crystal was placed on the National Register of Historic Places Inventory after nomination by the government of Gunnison County.

== Physiology ==
=== Climate ===
The highest average temperature is 68.1 degrees F (20.1 degrees C), while the lowest average temperature is 41.6 degrees F (5.3 degrees C). In July the average temperature is 56.8 degrees F (+13.8 degrees C), and in January the average temperature is 13.6 degrees F (-10.2 degrees C). The highest recorded temperature in the area was 106 degrees F (41.1 degrees C) on July 21, 2005. The lowest recorded temperature was -23 degrees F (-30.6 degrees C) on January 13, 1963. There are an average of 90 days each year with temperatures above or equal to 90 degrees F (+32.2 degrees C), and 140 days a year with recorded temperatures below or equal to 32 degrees F (-1.7 degrees C). The average annual rainfall in inches is 10.63 (27 cm), while yearly annual snowfall in inches is 45 (114.3 cm).

=== Parent Rock ===
The rock in the Elk Mountain Range in the area surrounding Crystal is composed primarily of (90%) sedimentary material, including mostly coarse clastics, shale, and limestone. The last 10% is mostly igneous rock. The Maroon Mountains formations (which are the closest notable mountains to the valley town of Crystal) are composed of mostly sandstone and siltstone, which are coarse clastic rocks and are exposed for the most part. Fine clastic rocks cover a fifth of Crystal. Glacial remain and out-wash created the sandy loam material which fill the valleys in the area, including the bottom of the Crystal River which runs through the valley in Crystal and surrounding towns.

=== Topography ===
The elevation of Crystal is centered at 8,950 ft (2,728 m), however the area in and around crystal ranges from 8,500 ft (2,590.8 m) to peaks of 13,500 ft (4,114.8 m). The land is well drained, and the rock types, such as limestone, create very steep slopes, common in the Rocky Mountains. The area is described as having classically alpine terrain in characteristics, and the sources of the areas streams are mainly glacial cirques. Barren parts of the mountains that are at elevations, low enough to support vegetation growth, are primarily unable to support much vegetation, due to the steep slopes and the large accumulation of shale rocks.

== Overview ==
Crystal is vacated in the winter but there are a few summer residents. The town does see visitors, most passing through to recreate in the area. The upper Crystal River Valley is nestled between two wilderness areas: the Maroon Bells–Snowmass Wilderness to the north and the Raggeds Wilderness to the south. Photography, hiking, peak bagging, mountain biking and four-wheel-drive and off-highway vehicle touring are common activities. Fly fishing and hunting (deer and elk) are also popular.

Today Crystal is best known for one of the most photographed historic sites in Colorado, the Crystal Mill, which was listed on the National Register of Historic Places in 1985.

== Transportation ==
Gunnison County Road 3 connects Crystal to Marble. Much of the road is a rocky shelf road, suitable for four-wheel drive only.

Forest Road 317 (a.k.a. Gothic Road) connects Crystal to Crested Butte via Schofield Pass. It traverses the Devils Punchbowl, considered among the most dangerous four-wheel drive trails in the state.

== Gallery ==
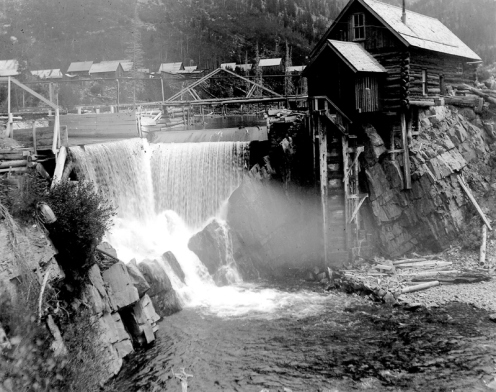
Crystal mill (foreground) and town (behind), 1890s

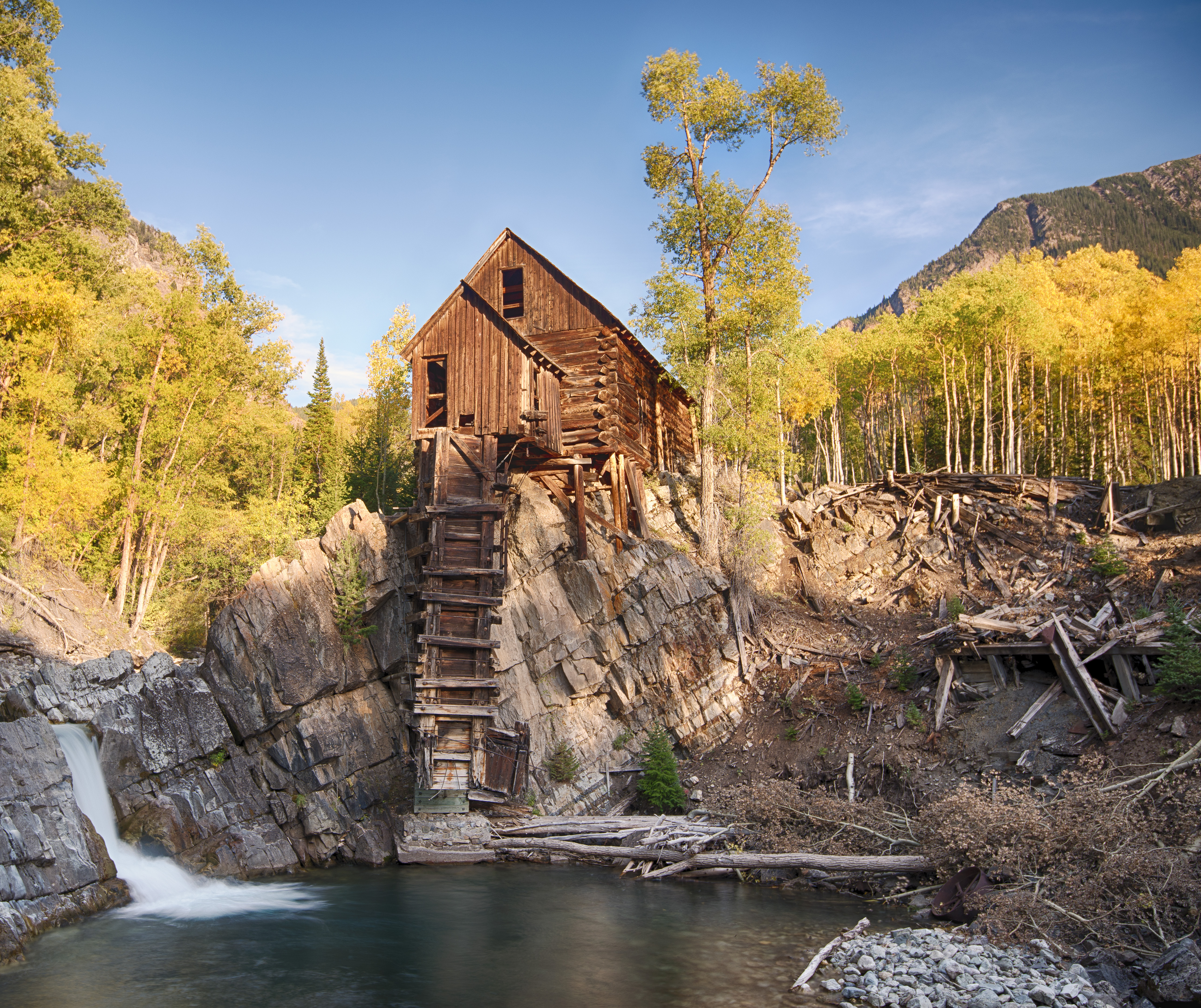
Crystal mill, 2012

Cabin in Crystal, 2015

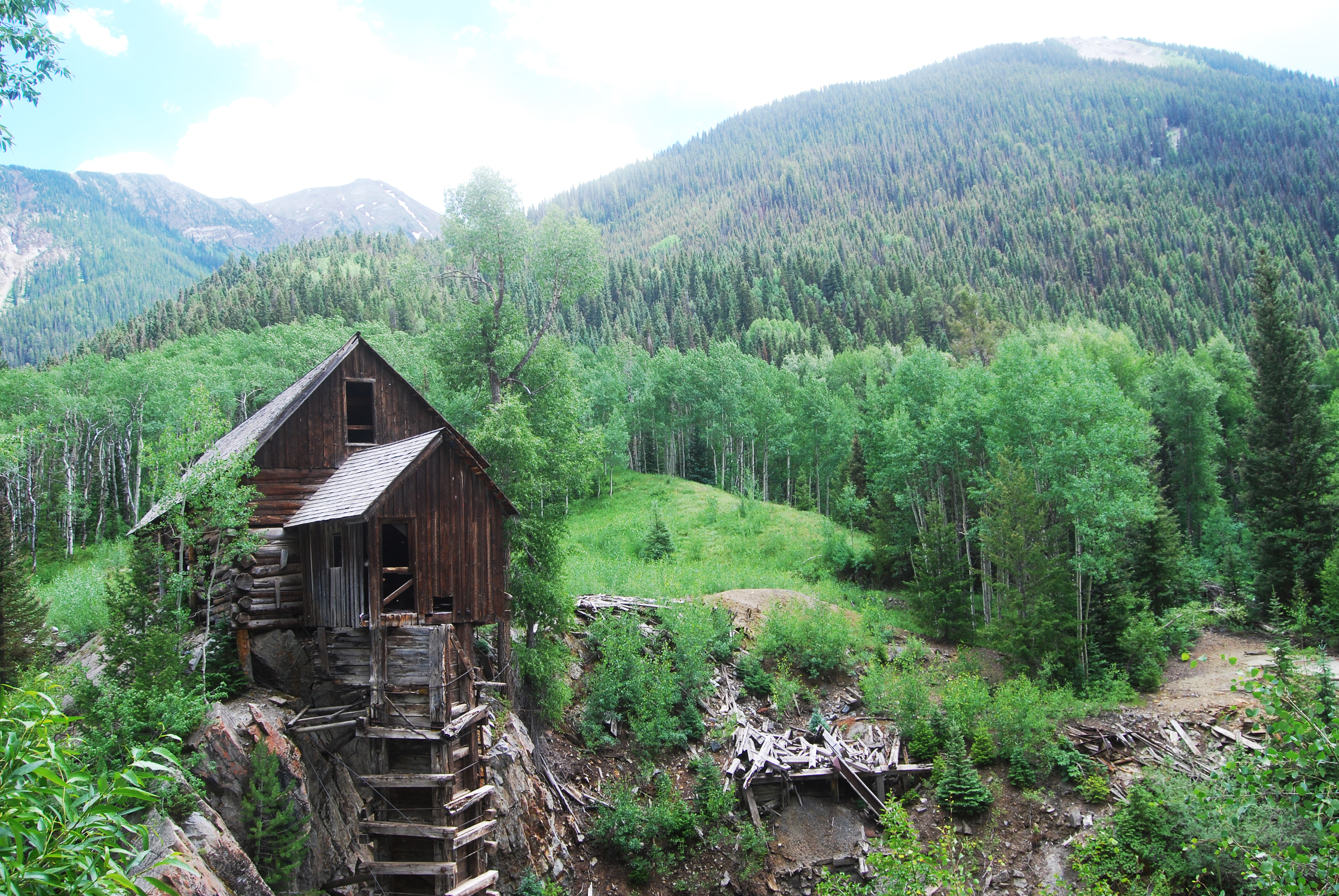
The Crystal Mill, among the Elk Mountains in 2016. Crystal, CO

== See also ==
- List of ghost towns in Colorado
- List of municipalities in Colorado
- List of populated places in Colorado
- List of post offices in Colorado
