= List of windmills in Illinois =

This is a list of traditional windmills in the American state of Illinois.

Windmills having coordinates below can be seen together in "Map all coordinates using OpenSourceMap" at right.

Windmill	Location	Type	Built	Notes	Photograph
Heidemann Mill; Old Mill	Addison	Smock	1868	Burnt down 1958	
Siedhoff Mill; Old Dutch Mill; Barrington Roller Flour Mill	Barrington		1867	Burnt down 5 August 1884	
Depner Mill	Beecher				
Franzen Mill; Old Flax Mill	Bensenville		1850		
Schmidt Brothers Mill; Benson Mill	Benson	Smock	1872		
Jansonnist Mill	Bishop Hill		1848		
Holstein Mill	Bloomingdale	Smock	1872	Wrecked by tornado 1899, later demolished.	
Gridley & Covel Mill	Bloomington				
Jung Mill	Broadview	Smock	1884	Standing 1884	
Clark Mill	Burnt Prairie		1837	Standing 1837	
Blooker Mill, World's Columbian Exhibition	Chicago	Smock	1893		
Derelict mill, Worlds Columbian Exhibition	Chicago	Smock	1893	Exhibited with an Aermotor windpump erected on top	
Old Dutch Mill, Century of Progress Exhibition	Chicago	Tower	1933	1934	
Mates Mill, Haymarket	Chicago			Moved at unknown date to Milwaukee Avenue.	
Gray Mill, Milwaukee Ave	Chicago			Demolished 1910.	
Vanden Berg Mill	Chicago				
McKay Mill	Chicago		1851	Standing 1851.	
Jefferson Mill	Des Plaines		1841		
Fischer Mill; Old Dutch Mill; Mount Emblem Cemetery Mill; Ehlers' Mill	Elmhurst; 41°55′46″N 87°55′24″W	Smock	1867	Closed to the public	
Lalande Mill	Fort de Chartres		1731		
Lahman Mill	Franklin Grove	Smock	1874	Demolished 1900	
De Immigrant	Fulton; 41°52′2″N 90°10′7″W	Smock	2000	Open and operational	
Fabyan Mill	Geneva; 41°52′17″N 88°18′21″W	Smock	1915	Tallest windmill in Illinois, open and operational.	
Glen Ellyn Mill	Glen Ellyn			Burnt down prior to 1855.	
Prairie Mills	Golden; 40°6′22.2″N 91°0′56″W	Smock	1873	Open and operational	
Franzen's Old Mill	Golden	Smock	1854	Demolished 1934	
Gronewold Mill	Golden		1865		
Franzen Brothers Mill	Gridley		1872		
Rinn Mill; Holland Mill	Hampshire	Smock	1875	1883	
Swearingen Windmill	Industry		1927-1930?	Never functional. Built as restaurant attraction in the late 1920s. Still standing.	
Jesuit Mill	Kaskaskia		1711		
Milburn Mill	Kentucky			Wrecked by a storm prior to 1789	
Lake Zurich Mill	Lake Zurich		1850s	Demolished in 1858	
Matteson Mill	Matteson	Smock	1870s		
Schroeder Mill; Monee Mill	Monee	Smock		Standing in 1910	
Sauer Mill	Nebraska Township		1869	Moved to Gridley 1872	
Jahnke Mill	Palatine		1879	Standing in 1894	
Du Sable Mill	Peoria		1691	Standing in 1773	
Maillet Mill	Peoria		1778		
Peotone Mill	Peotone; 41°19′55″N 87°47′49″W	Smock	1872	Closed, awaiting restoration	
Brand Mill	Polo		1850s	Damaged by a tornado, date unknown	
St Joseph					
Brockman Mill; Des Plaines Mill; Park Ridge Mill; Old Dutch Mill	Schiller Park	Smock	1870	Demolished 1920s	
Somonauk Mill	Somonauk	Smock			
Bartels Mill; Old Mill; New Bremen Mill	Tinley Park	Smock	1873	Demolished 1911	
Phillipe Mill	Urbana				
Old Mill Farm Mill	Winnetka	Smock			
	York Township	Smock	1875	Dismantled 1914, re-erected at Geneva 1915	
	Unknown location	Smock			

== Notes ==
Known building dates are in bold text. Non-bold text denotes first recorded date. Iron windpumps are outside the scope of this list unless listed on the National Register of Historic Places.
