= Crystal River (Colorado) =

River in Gunnison and Pitkin counties Colorado, United States

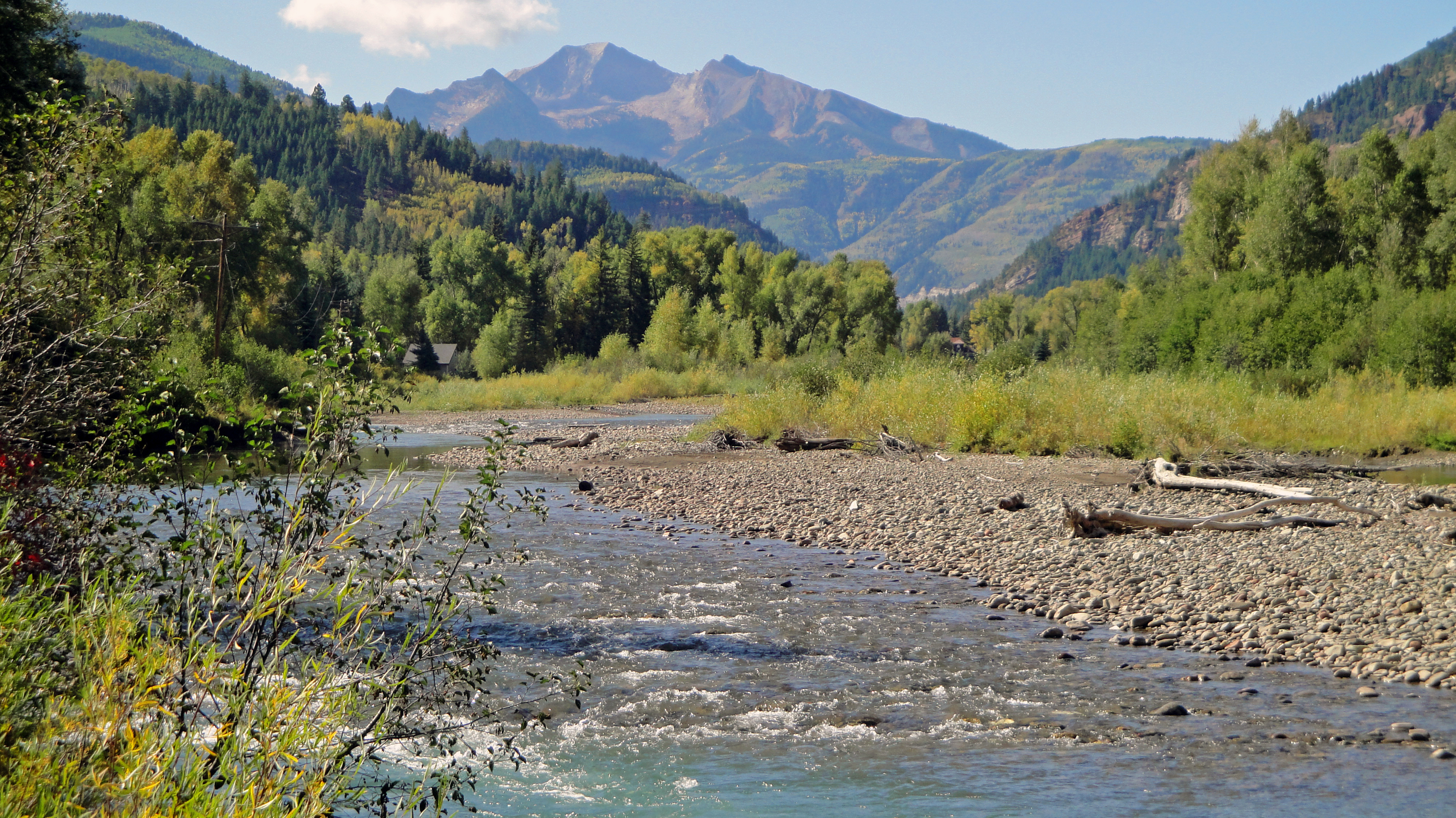
- Crystal River at Redstone, with Chair Mountain in distance, September 2009

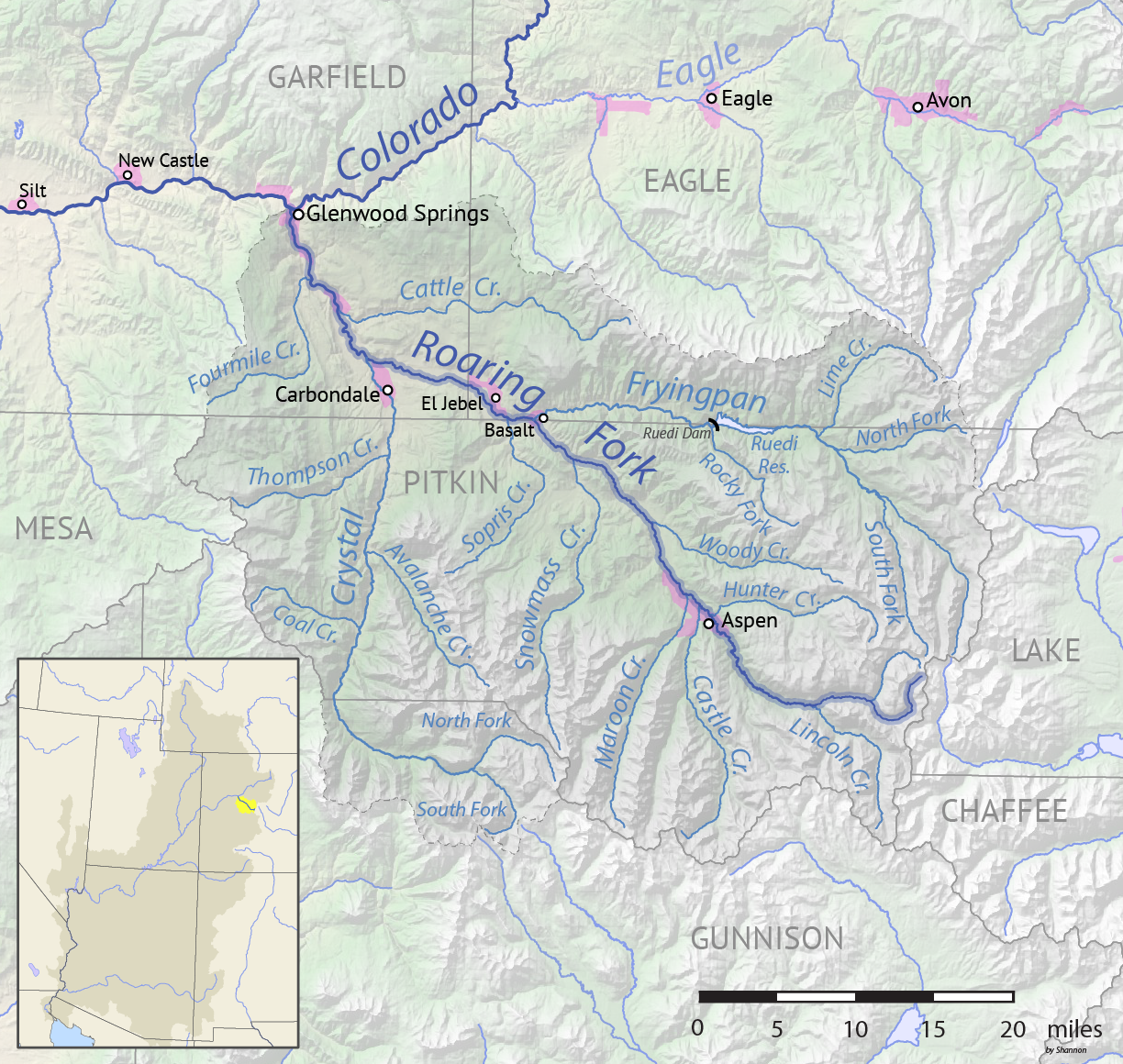
- Map of Roaring Fork drainage basin, including the Crystal River

Physical characteristics
- Source
  - location: Confluence of North Fork Crystal River and South Fork Crystal River
  - coordinates: 39°03′32″N 107°06′15″W
  - elevation
- Mouth
  - location: Confluence with Roaring Fork River
  - coordinates: 39°25′07″N 107°14′10″W
  - elevation: 6,060 ft (1,850 m)

Basin features
- Progression: Roaring Fork—Colorado

The Crystal River is a tributary of the Roaring Fork River. It is approximately 40 miles (64 km) long and is located in Gunnison, Pitkin and Garfield counties in Colorado, United States.

The river is a popular fly fishing and outdoor tourism destination.

The Crystal River remains one of the few rivers in Colorado that is undammed along its length, making the segments that are upstream of large ranching irrigation diversions outside of Carbondale eligible for federal Wild and Scenic River protection.

The Crystal Valley historically was a seasonal home and hunting ground of the Parianuche and Yampa bands of the Ute people.

== Description ==
The watershed includes a series of prehistorically glaciated valleys on the west side of the Elk Mountains such as Avalanche Creek, Silver Creek, Yule Creek and the North and South Forks of the Crystal. It also drains southern portions of the east side of the Thompson Divide via Coal Basin, Perham Creek, and Thompson Creek. The village of Redstone and Coal Basin was historically a center of coal mining, while quarrying for Yule Marble in Marble continues presently. It rises in northern Gunnison County on the north side of Schofield Pass near the Maroon Bells and passes through the ghost town of Crystal City, still inhabited by a few summer residents and known for the Crystal Mill photographic attraction. It then flows north past Marble into Pitkin County and past Redstone. It joins the Roaring Fork below Carbondale in Garfield County. State Highway 133 follows the river along much of its route from Carbondale until several miles below Marble, where 133 turns southwest and crosses McClure Pass towards Paonia and Delta, Colorado.

From Crystal City to Marble the river flows through the Crystal River Canyon, a narrow valley with numerous snowslide runs, rockfalls, and other hazardous terrain. Although it is locally known as a fishing and hiking attraction the unpaved and largely un-maintained mining road, designated Gunnison County Road 3 on Mapquest, is nearly impassable to vehicles other than ATVs and off-road motorcycles. A four-wheel-drive Jeep tour is operated out of Marble, but only operates during the summer when the road is not blocked by snow, mud, or rock slides.

== See also ==
- List of rivers of Colorado
- List of tributaries of the Colorado River
- South Fork Crystal River
