= List of Rescue 911 episodes =

The following is a list of episodes of the CBS television series Rescue 911. Unless indicated, segment titles are as they appeared in 1990s TV listings (e.g., as compiled by Fancast) when the show aired in syndication. Titles denoted with an asterisk (*) were obtained from other sources and may be incorrect. Production numbers are according to the United States Copyright Office.

== Series overview ==
Season	Episodes	Originally released		
Season	Episodes	First released	Last released	Network
Specials	2	April 18, 1989	May 9, 1989	CBS
1	30	September 5, 1989	May 15, 1990	CBS
2	29	September 11, 1990	May 14, 1991	CBS
3	27	September 17, 1991	May 19, 1992	CBS
4	28	September 15, 1992	May 25, 1993	CBS
5	28	September 14, 1993	May 24, 1994	CBS
6	29	September 13, 1994	May 23, 1995	CBS
7	15	September 12, 1995	August 27, 1996	CBS
Syndicated episodes	300	August 2, 1993	March 8, 1996	Syndication

== Episodes ==
=== Specials (1989) ===
==== Special #1 (April 18, 1989) ====
- Pilot Episode
- The segments may not have been presented in the order listed

Title	Event date	Event location	Description	External links
"Church Bus"	July 17, 1987	Comfort, Texas	Helicopters attempt to rescue a bus load of children stranded in the flooded Guadalupe River.	Location of Guadalupe River on Google Street View
"Houston Trauma Docu"		Houston, Texas	A stabbing victim and a baby injured in a car crash are treated at Ben Taub General Hospital (Docu segment).	Location of Harris Health Ben Taub Hospital on Google Street View
"Arlington" (aka "Arlington 9-1-1")	December 14, 1988	Arlington, Texas	A girl calls 911 as her father and brother struggle with an armed intruder.	
"Baby Fire Rescue"	February 9, 1989	Washington, D.C.	When a babysitter's apartment catches fire while she has eight babies under her care, she has to throw the babies out the third-floor window to safety.	Location of the apartment fire

==== Special #2 (May 9, 1989) ====
- Second Pilot Episode

Title	Event date	Event location	Description	External links
"Icy River"	December 4, 1987	Moorhead, Minnesota	A boy falls into the frozen Red River of the North.	Location of Red River of the North (approximate location of incident) on Google Street View AP News article (December 17, 1987) about incident Deseret News article (February 26, 1989) about incident
"911 Arsonist"	January 29, 1989	Houston, Texas	A youth sets a house on fire, then calls 911 repeatedly to taunt the police.	
"Highway Hero"	March 23, 1987	Timonium, Maryland	A high-speed chase occurs on Interstate 83 when a suicidal woman speeds head-on into oncoming traffic, and a patrolman throws his life in the balance to save innocent drivers.	Approximate location of mile marker 71 on I-70 West (where high-speed chase ended) on Google Street View Article from The Washington Post (March 25, 1987) about incident AP News article (December 17, 1987) about Leona B. Hann's case Article from The Washington Post (March 16, 1989) about incident and re-enactment
"Sudden Death"	1989	Houston, Texas	Houston paramedics respond to calls involving patients in cardiac arrest (Docu segment).	
"Dog Rescue"	July 31, 1987	Chesterfield, Virginia	An 8-year-old girl is abducted and stabbed while fishing, and rescuers use dogs to track her down. Actress Hillary Bost played abducted girl Joanna Chinnis (Reaired on Episode 1.13 on December 12, 1989)	

=== Season 1 (1989–90) ===
- Season 1 consists of 30 episodes (29 original episodes and 1 compilation episode), also Episodes #107-#108, #107 "Flooded Cave" and #108 "Miami cops Docu" has deleted scenes shown only in the intro, not in the actual segment/s.

==== Episode 1.1 (September 5, 1989) ====
Title	Event date	Event location	Description	External links
"Arroyo Boy"	June 10, 1988	Albuquerque, New Mexico	A teenage boy is swept into a floodwater channel while skateboarding, and a firefighter gets swept away trying to save him.	Location of floodwater channel at Matheson Park on Google Street View
"Parachute"	April 17, 1987	Coolidge, Arizona	Debbie Williams, a sky diver, collides in mid-air with another sky diver and is knocked unconscious.	Approximate location where Debbie Williams hit the ground on Google Street View AP News article (April 23, 1987) about incident Los Angeles Times article (May 10, 1987) about incident
"Supermarket Hostage"	August 1, 1987	Elkhart, Indiana	Employees and customers at a supermarket are taken hostage during a robbery.	
"New York City Docu"	July 4, 1989	Bronx, New York	New York City firefighters respond to a fire on the Fourth of July (Docu segment).	
"911 Birth"	May 16, 1989	Cobb County, Georgia	A woman gives birth while home with her younger daughter.	

==== Episode 1.2 (September 12, 1989) ====
Title	Event date	Event location	Description	External links
"Dames Point Bridge"	May 15, 1989	Jacksonville, Florida	A cherry picker being used for an inspection of the Dames Point Bridge fails, leaving one inspector in the river, another hanging from his harness and two more trapped in the bucket.	Location of Dames Point Bridge on Google Street View
"CPR Baby"	May 16, 1988	Xenia, Ohio	An infant stops breathing following a seizure.	
"Conrail Train"	May 1, 1989	Ramsey, New Jersey	Two young boys are nearly hit by a train while playing on the tracks.	Location of train tracks (approximate location of incident) on Google Street View
"Maryland Med (Chad)"		Baltimore, Maryland	A teenager is in a car crash (Docu Segment).	Location of crash on Google Street View
"Pool Electrocution"	May 27, 1989	Houston, Texas	A 16-year-old gets electrocuted while cleaning his pool when his vacuum pole touches a power line.	

==== Episode 1.3 (September 19, 1989) ====
Title	Event date	Event location	Description	External links
"Player Down"	November 7, 1986	Springdale, Arkansas	A 17-year-old high school student suffers a heart attack during a football game, causing the game to be suspended.	Location of Jarrell Williams Bulldog Stadium at Springdale High School on Google Street View
"Air Five"	July 1, 1989	Los Angeles, California	A helicopter crew aids a man who fell off a cliff (Docu Segment).	
"American River"	1982	American River, California	A man is pinned underwater by a boulder while prospecting.	Approximate location of incident on American River on Google Street View
"Landing Gear"	March 12, 1985	St. Augustine, Florida	A plane's landing gear gets jammed.	Location of Northeast Florida Regional Airport on Google Street View
"Remorseful Burglar"	May 19, 1989	Los Angeles, California	A burglar gets trapped inside a glass store and has to call 911 to get help.	

==== Episode 1.4 (September 26, 1989) ====
Title	Event date	Event location	Description	External links
"St. Jays River"	October 21, 1987	Elkhart, Indiana	A girl driving with her mother in a vehicle with an automatic transmission and a learner's permit crashes into a river, and a man risks his life to save them.	Approximate location of crash on Google Street View
"911 Lansing Stabbing"	October 16, 1988	Lansing, Michigan	A burglar stabs a woman when she returns home.	
"River Raft"	May 24, 1989	Hamilton, Ohio	A teenage rafter becomes trapped after his raft capsizes.	Approximate location of incident on Great Miami River on Google Street View
		Pittsburgh, Pennsylvania	Three patients await organ transplants at Presbyterian-University Hospital (Docu segment).	Location of University of Pittsburgh Medical Center-Presbyterian Hospital on Google Street View
"Storm Drain Girl"	June 26, 1989	Houston, Texas	A 7-year-old girl is swept into a storm drain during Tropical Storm Allison.	

==== Episode 1.5 (October 3, 1989) ====
Title	Event date	Event location	Description	External links
"Shaft Toddler"	April 24, 1986	Colts Neck Township, Monmouth County, New Jersey	A young boy is trapped in a deep shaft.	
"Easter Hunt"	March 25, 1989	Glamis, California	Relatives and others, including pilot Zoey Tur, use a helicopter to search for a man needing a kidney transplant in a large RV campsite.	
"Furnace Fire"	June 21, 1988	Calhan, Colorado	A man's furnace develops a propane leak and explodes when he tries to light it, severely burning him and his two children.	
"Swamp Save"	August 11, 1988	Baton Rouge, Louisiana	A truck driver on Interstate 10 falls through the windshield of his truck and into the Atchafalaya Swamp after he crashes on a slippery highway.	Approximate location of crash on Google Street View

==== Episode 1.6 (October 10, 1989) ====
Title	Event date	Event location	Description	External links
"Pool Child"	Summer 1988	New Iberia, Louisiana	A boy gets his arm stuck in a pool drain and a lifeguard must perform CPR underwater.	
"Atlanta Fire"	June 30, 1989	Atlanta, Georgia	A fire in a high-rise office building.	Location of Peachtree 25th office building on Google Street View AP News article (July 3, 1989) about fire
"911 Break-In Boy"	June 6, 1986	Salinas, California	A boy calls 911 while he and his sister hide from an intruder.	
"Baltimore Cops"	February 18, 1989	Baltimore, Maryland	A man is murdered in a restaurant (Docu segment).	Location of Yellow Bowl Restaurant on Google Street View
"Highway Hero"	March 23, 1987	Timonium, Maryland	A high-speed chase on Interstate 83 (repeat from the second pilot episode).	

==== Episode 1.7 (October 17, 1989) ====
- Portions of this episode were preempted for CBS News coverage of the Loma Prieta Earthquake. It first aired in full on December 5, 1989.

Title	Event date	Event location	Description	External links
"Flooded Cave"	July 1, 1985	Marion Township, Lawrence County, Indiana	A young man is trapped for 3 days in a cave in Spring Mill State Park.	Location of Donaldson Cave (approximate location of incident) at Spring Mill State Park on Google Street View
"SF Neonatal Docu"	March 1989	San Francisco, California	Premature twins are treated at a perinatal hospital (Docu segment).	Location of UCSF Medical Center at Mount Zion on Google Street View
	February 12, 1989	San Dimas, California	The owner of a trucking business is robbed of the cash he kept in a safe in his home in the presence of his family.	
		San Francisco, California	San Francisco firefighters respond to an apartment fire (Docu segment)	
	April 30, 1988	Hayward, California	An owner of a bowling alley saves a young girl who is attacked by a child molester.	

==== Episode 1.8 (October 24, 1989) ====
Title	Event date	Event location	Description	External links
"Feed-Bin Boy"	June 3, 1989	South Franklin Township, Pennsylvania	A toddler falls into a feed chute and suffocates.	
"Police Quagmire"	October 14	Baltimore, Maryland	Following a high-speed chase and foot pursuit, an officer gets stuck in a swamp.	
"Smoke-Filled House"	December 1986	Olympia, Washington	A woman is trapped in her burning house.	
		Miami, Florida	Ride-along with a Miami undercover cop (Docu segment).	
"Icy River"	December 4, 1987	Moorhead, Minnesota	A boy falls into the frozen Red River of the North (Repeat from second pilot episode).	

==== Episode 1.9 (October 31, 1989) ====
Title	Event date	Event location	Description	External links
"911 Rifle"	August 1, 1989	Indianapolis, Indiana	A boy accidentally shoots his friend's sister with a rifle.	Article from The Indianapolis Star about incident and re-enactment
"Double Football Player"	May 27, 1989	Murfreesboro, Tennessee	Former NFL player Jerry Anderson dies while saving a boy from drowning.	Location of west fork of Stones River (approximate location of incident) on Google Street View
	October 26, 1987	Wilkes-Barre, Pennsylvania	A 16-year-old boy home sick from school helps the woman living above him rescue her two small children when the apartment catches fire.	
"Sudden Death"	1989	Houston, Texas	Houston paramedics respond to calls involving patients in cardiac arrest (Docu segment) (repeated from second pilot episode).	

==== Episode 1.10 (November 7, 1989) ====
Title	Event date	Event location	Description	External links
"Funny Car"	July 22, 1989	Denver, Colorado	Drag racer Don Gay Jr.'s funny car explodes during a race.	Location of Bandimere Speedway on Google Street View
"Infrared"	July 18, 1989	Fort Worth, Texas	Police helicopter uses flir device to track a fleeing burglar.	
"Dirt Bike Boy"	August 16, 1989	Amarillo, Texas	A boy loses control of his dirt bike and falls off a 30-foot cliff, and his twin brother treats him while their father tries to get help.	
"Stranded Octos"	January 19, 1989	Charleston, South Carolina	An elderly couple on a fishing trip become lost at sea for five days after their boat breaks down, eventually being rescued after the Coast Guard stumbles across them during a drill.	Location of Charleston Yacht Club (at George M. Lockwood Municipal Marina) on Google Street View Approximate location on Bay Point Island where elderly couple was found on Google Street View

==== Episode 1.11 (November 14, 1989) ====
Title	Event date	Event location	Description	External links
"911 Under the Bed"	September	Los Angeles, California	A teenage girl on the phone with 911 hides under the bed when intruders enter her grandmother's house.	
"Phoenix Aerovac"		Phoenix, Arizona, Casa Grande, Arizona	Helicopter crew picks up a young girl kicked in the face by a horse (Docu segment).	
"Double Electrocution"	July 20, 1989	Fallon, Nevada	A car crash on US 50 knocks down power lines, electrocuting one of the crash victims and one of the Good Samaritans trying to save him.	Approximate location of crash on U.S. Route 50 on Google Street View
	June 10, 1989	Castle Rock, Colorado	Two girls are missing at Devil's Head Lookout.	Location of Devil's Head Lookout on Google Street View

==== Episode 1.12 (November 28, 1989) ====
Title	Event date	Event location	Description	External links
"911 Smart Victim"	May 5, 1989	Tucson, Arizona	A woman tries to lock a suspicious man out of her home, but when her young son lets the man in, the woman sneaks a call to 911 by pretending to be on the phone about her job.	
"Heart Attack Hubby"	July 1, 1989	Kingwood, Texas	When a dispatcher gets a phone call about someone having a heart attack, she finds that the victim is her husband.	
	October 19, 1985	West Windsor, New Jersey	An arrested man feigns a heart attack, then takes an ambulance crew as hostages.	
"911 Dad's Baby"	September 3, 1989	Huntington Beach, California	A squeamish man must deliver his wife's baby with the help of a 911 operator.	

==== Episode 1.13 (December 12, 1989) ====
Title	Event date	Event location	Description	External links
"911 Conference Call"	July 20, 1989	Dallas, Texas	A mentally ill man shoots his sister and threatens other family members.	
"Puerto Rico"	December 31, 1986	San Juan, Puerto Rico	Dupont Plaza Hotel arson.	Location of Dupont Plaza Hotel (now San Juan Marriott Resort & Stellaris Casino) on Google Street View
"Heimlich Brothers"	April 24, 1989	Baton Rouge, Louisiana	A boy does the Heimlich maneuver on his choking brother just hours after learning it in school.	Location of The Runnels School (which permanently closed in May 2020) on Google Street View
"Dog Rescue"	July 31, 1987	Chesterfield, Virginia	An 8-year-old girl is abducted and stabbed while fishing. Actress Hillary Bost played abducted girl Joanna Chinnis (repeat from the second pilot episode).	Hillary Bost

==== Episode 1.14 (December 19, 1989) ====
Title	Event date	Event location	Description	External links
"Seattle Cop Down"	May 15, 1989	Seattle, Washington	When a police officer is shot and paralyzed during a traffic stop, Good Samaritans assist him and help police to track down the shooters.	Approximate location of incident on Google Street View
"Gas Leak Hero"	November 6, 1988	Skokie, Illinois	A young gas worker saves an elderly couple from carbon monoxide poisoning.	
"Catalina Diver"	May 14, 1989	Santa Catalina Island, California	A scuba diver surfaces too quickly and gets the bends.	Satellite view of Santa Catalina Island
"Baby Fire Rescue"	February 9, 1989	Washington, D.C.	A babysitter must toss 8 babies out the window during an apartment fire (repeat from the pilot episode).	

==== Episode 1.15 (January 2, 1990) ====
[30-Minute Episode]

Title	Event date	Event location	Description	External links
"Dynamite"	August 17, 1989	Whatcom County, Washington	A stick of dynamite explodes in a construction worker's hand on a fracking test site, and his friend must get help to save his life.	
"Rocking Chair"	September 1988	Brookfield, Connecticut	Two ex-convicts rob a family winery, tie up the owner's son with phone cords, and lead police on a hot pursuit after the son manages to call 911.	

==== Episode 1.16 (January 9, 1990) ====
Title	Event date	Event location	Description	External links
"Chemistry Hero"	January 31, 1989	Durham, North Carolina	A chemistry student accidentally creates an explosive compound, and his teacher fails to rush the smoking beaker out of the building before it explodes in his face.	Location of Durham High School on Google Street View
"De-Fib Phone"	June 25, 1989	St. Louis, Missouri	An ER nurse helps a man use a home defibrillator for the first time ever when the man's wife has a massive heart attack while waiting for a transplant.	Article from The New York Times (July 9, 1989) about incident
"Amtrak"	January 4, 1987	Chase, Maryland	1987 Maryland train collision: An Amtrak passenger train crashes into three Conrail locomotives.	Satellite view of tracks where crash occurred
"Arlington"	December 14, 1988	Arlington, Texas	An intruder breaks into a girl's house and attempts to kill her brother and father (repeat from the pilot episode).	

==== Episode 1.17 (January 23, 1990) ====
Title	Event date	Event location	Description	External links
"Blind Hero"	December 31, 1987	Novato, California	A blind man helps evacuate his neighbors when his apartment catches fire.	
"Runaway Garbage Truck"	August 4, 1989	Frankfort, Kentucky	When a garbage truck being towed breaks loose and falls, it crushes 3 occupied cars, belonging to a 17-year-old girl, a middle-aged couple, and a state trooper's family.	Location of crash on Google Street View
"Motel Hostage"	September 13, 1989	Richmond, Virginia	A Red Roof Inn is robbed by two thieves, and one of the suspects takes the clerk hostage.	Location of Red Roof Inn where robbery occurred on Google Street View
"Church Bus"	July 17, 1987	Comfort, Texas	Helicopters attempt to rescue a bus load of children stranded in the flooded Guadalupe River (repeat from the pilot episode).	Location of Guadalupe River on Google Street View

==== Episode 1.18 (January 30, 1990) ====
Title	Event date	Event location	Description	External links
"Hugo I"	September 21, 1989	Charleston, South Carolina	A radio tower falls on an occupied house during Hurricane Hugo, and an elderly woman is buried alive in the rubble.	
"Woman Car Rescue"	June 10, 1988	Northern California	A major crash on Highway 4 leaves a man trapped in a burning car and a woman is the only one willing to save him.	
"Maryland Med"	July 28, 1989	Baltimore, Maryland	A young man paralyzed by diving into shallow water is treated at R Adams Cowley Shock Trauma Center (Docu segment).	Location of R Adams Cowley Shock Trauma Center on Google Street View
"911 Arsonist"	January 29, 1989	Houston, Texas	A youth sets a house on fire, then calls 911 repeatedly to taunt police (repeat from the second pilot episode).	

==== Episode 1.19 (February 13, 1990) ====
Title	Event date	Event location	Description	External links
"Resurrection Rescue"	August 30, 1988	Washington, D.C.	Firefighters revive children pulled from their grandmother's burning house, but some of the children die.	
"Runaway Boxcars"	October 3, 1985	Northville, Michigan	Two runaway boxcars push an elderly couple's car down train tracks and a cop risks his life trying to stop them, but the wife is killed.	Location of train tracks on Google Street View
"Kidnapped Kids"	April 16, 1989	Tyler, Texas	A boy sees his friend get kidnapped while walking together, and immediately runs home and has the friend's family and other friends call for help.	
"Supermarket Hero"	April 19, 1989	Stafford, Virginia	A Giant Food employee is injured while preventing a pregnant woman from getting hit after a toddler puts her grandfather's car in gear.	Location of Giant Food on Google Street View

==== Episode 1.20 (February 27, 1990) ====
Title	Event date	Event location	Description	External links
"Miracle Marine"	April 24, 1988	El Toro, California	A marine pilot crashes into a runway during an air show at Marine Corps Air Station El Toro.	Location of Marine Corps Air Station El Toro on Google Street View
"Boston"	October 23, 1989	Boston, Massachusetts	Charles Stuart kills his pregnant wife and commits suicide (Docu Segment).	Location where car was found on Google Street View Milwaukee Sentinel article on the Rescue 911 segment
"Heart Attack Car Save" (aka "Heart Attack Runaway Car")	February 14, 1989	Jackson, Mississippi	Nearby motorists stop a car driven by a man who suffers a heart attack while driving towards a busy intersection.	Location near where car was stopped on Google Street View

==== Episode 1.21 (February 28, 1990) ====
Title	Event date	Event location	Description	External links
"911 3-Year-Old"	October 10, 1989	Van Nuys, California	The 3-year-old grandson of Jimmie Rodgers calls 911 when his mother is choking.	
"Hunting Horror"	October 15, 1989	Enaville, Idaho	A woman is accidentally shot by a hunter, and her husband is injured but still manages to get help.	
		Albuquerque, New Mexico	Domestic Abuse Response Team counsels a family after a domestic disturbance (Docu segment).	
"Senior Sharpshooter"	November 9, 1989	Toledo, Ohio	An elderly woman shoots at an intruder and scares him into thinking he's been shot.	

==== Episode 1.22 (March 13, 1990) ====
Title	Event date	Event location	Description	External links
"911 Asthma"	October 27, 1989	Holland, Michigan	A woman does rescue breathing as instructed by a dispatcher when her boyfriend has an asthma attack.	
"Pesky Python"	August 1989	Fort Lauderdale, Florida	A couple discovers a 20-foot python living under their house.	
"Octallio Death Trap"	March 31, 1989	California	A man hauling race car fuel crashes over a rocky precipice and is trapped for three days.	STRONG WINDS POSSIBLE NEXT 12 MILES sign Approximate location of crash on Google Street View
"Virginia Beach EMS"		Virginia Beach, Virginia	Volunteer paramedics treat crash victims (Docu segment).	

==== Episode 1.23 (March 20, 1990) ====
[30-Minute Episode]

Title	Event date	Event location	Description	External links
"Saint Save"	May 29, 1989	Taos, New Mexico	A boy is lost in the mountains.	Approximate location where boy was found (Serpent Lake Trail Head) on Google Street View
"Denver General Knife"		Denver, Colorado	Paramedics pick up a victim whose throat was slashed in a fight (Docu segment).	

==== Episode 1.24 (March 27, 1990) ====
Title	Event date	Event location	Description	External links
"Deaf Save"	October 25, 1989	Chattanooga, Tennessee	A deaf woman uses her son as an interpreter to call police when an intruder breaks in.	
"Logger's Lament"	August 10, 1989	Bellingham, Washington	A runaway log pins a logger between two logs.	
"Speedboat Upside-Down"	August 12, 1989	St. Louis, Missouri	A flip leaves a speedboat racer trapped underwater.	
"New Orleans Docu Shoot"		New Orleans, Louisiana	A female cop patrols some of the meanest streets of New Orleans (Docu segment).	

==== Episode 1.25 (April 3, 1990) ====
Title	Event date	Event location	Description	External links
"911 Hidden Phone"	October 24, 1989	Taft, Florida	After returning home from a diner, an elderly man is shot by a burglar and uses a hidden phone to call 911.	
"Winter Pool Baby"	September 24, 1989	Claremont, California	A toddler is found at the bottom of a water filled pool cover.	
"Mount Whitney"	July 25, 1987	Mount Whitney, California	Two rock climbers are stranded on Mount Whitney after one breaks his leg.	
		Pittsburgh, Pennsylvania	Paramedics treat an elderly woman who was hit by a car and a man who was stabbed with a barbecue fork (Docu segment).	

==== Episode 1.26 (April 10, 1990) ====
Title	Event date	Event location	Description	External links
"Parrot Save"	September 23, 1983	East Boston, Massachusetts	A parrot alerts its owners of a gas leak during the East Boston gas surge	
"Stop, Drop, and Roll"	October 30, 1988	Pasadena, Texas	A boy's clothes catch fire when his best friend pours gasoline on matches and smoldering leaves inside a model volcano.	
	October 16, 1989	Bradenton, Florida	Three men are stranded at sea after their fishing boat fails	
	October 15, 1989	Denver, Colorado	Victims involved in a drunk driving crash are taken to Denver General Hospital (Docu segment)	Location of Denver General Hospital (now Denver Health Medical Center) on Google Street View

==== Episode 1.27 (April 25, 1990) ====
Title	Event date	Event location	Description	External links
"Suicide Save"	December 11, 1989	Tipton, Iowa, Tempe, Arizona	A telemarketer reaches an answering machine with a seemingly suicidal message.	
"Miami Medchopper"	June 1989	Miami, Florida	Metro-Dade emergency helicopter picks up two victims shot in a restaurant robbery (Docu segment).	
"Hugo II"	September 21, 1989	Charleston, South Carolina	Stories from Hurricane Hugo including a power outage at a hospital, a dispatcher and her son who were separated during the storm, and victims who sought refuge in a high school that began to flood.	

==== Episode 1.28 (May 1, 1990) ====
Title	Event date	Event location	Description	External links
"911 Chatty Burglar" (aka "Chatty Robber")	December 19, 1989	Salt Lake City, Utah	When a nurse is held hostage by an intruder at her patient's house, a 911 dispatcher takes control of the situation and talks to the burglar to keep him occupied.	
"Whale Save"	October 1, 1989	Prince Edward Island, Canada	Several beached whales are rescued.	
"Rescuers Rescued"	October 1, 1989	Macon, Georgia	An ambulance en route to an emergency is in a crash, and a Good Samaritan rescues the paramedics.	
"Marble Save"	November 14, 1989	Norfolk, Virginia	A toddler chokes on a marble and two contractors are forced to use the Heimlich maneuver, despite not having any CPR training.	

==== Episode 1.29 (May 8, 1990) ====
- This was a compilation episode that revisited highlights from the first season

Title	Event date	Event location	Description	External links
"Runaway Boxcars"	October 3, 1985	Northville, Michigan	Two runaway boxcars push a couple's car down a train track, killing the wife, and a cop risks his life to stop the boxcars before they reach a narrow bridge.	
"911 Dad's Baby"	September 3, 1989	Huntington Beach, California	A man must deliver his wife's baby with the help of a 911 operator.	
"Woman Car Rescue"	June 10, 1988	California	A major crash on Highway 4 leaves a man trapped in a burning car.	
"911 3-Year-Old"	October 10, 1989	Van Nuys, California	A 3-year-old boy calls 911 when his mother chokes on a cough drop.	

==== Episode 1.30 (May 15, 1990) ====
Title	Event date	Event location	Description	External links
"911 Sibling Stabbing"	December 27, 1989	Atlanta, Georgia	A girl accidentally stabs her little brother with a sharp kitchen knife, and the boy's siblings have to keep him calm until help comes.	
"Prison EMTs"	April 13, 1988	Nashville, Tennessee	Two escaping prisoners take paramedics and prison personnel as hostages after one of them fakes a heart attack.	AP News article about the incident
"School Bus Save"	November 28, 1989	Smyrna, Delaware	A girl is run over by a school bus and her stepbrother saves her from further injury.	Location of Smyrna Elementary School on Google Street View

=== Season 2 (1990–91) ===
- Season 2 consists of 29 original episodes.

==== Episode 2.1 (September 11, 1990) ====
- 30-Minute Episode

Title	Event date	Event location	Description	External links
"Peeping Prowler"	October 9, 1986	Gainesville, Florida	When a couple calls the police about a peeping tom in an apartment complex, police discover that he is a burglar who murdered other people.	
"Sister Save"	November 29, 1989	Dallas, Texas	A house catches fire while two girls are being babysat, and one of them gets trapped.	

==== Episode 2.2 (September 18, 1990) ====
Title	Event date	Event location	Description	External links
"Scuba Cave"	May 19, 1990	Gainesville, Florida	Scuba divers are trapped in an underwater cave.	Satellite view of Otter Springs
"911 Gun Shop"	January 17, 1989	Fresno, California	A gun store owner is shot over nine times by armed robbers.	
"Loma Linda Docu"	1987	Loma Linda, California; Vancouver, British Columbia; Orillia, Ontario, Canada	A newborn baby receives a heart transplant.	

==== Episode 2.3 (September 25, 1990) ====
Title	Event date	Event location	Description	External links
"Houdini Save"	September 22, 1989	DeKalb County, Georgia	A magician falls while attempting the Houdini straight jacket escape.	Approximate location of Northlake Punch Line (which closed in 1990) on Google Street View
"911 Fatal Attraction"	June 16, 1989	El Cajon, California	A woman's ex-husband breaks into her house and shoots her.	
"Dangling Skier"	January 29, 1990	Ogden, Utah	When a girl doesn't make it into the seat of the Little Cat ski lift at Nordic Valley ski area, her mother holds onto her by one arm until she is safe.	Location of Nordic Valley Ski Resort on Google Street View Google News article on incident
"Bear Rescue"	August 14, 1989	Albuquerque, New Mexico	A bear climbs a power pole and gets electrocuted.	

==== Episode 2.4 (October 2, 1990) ====
Title	Event date	Event location	Description	External links
"Sis Burn Car Save"	April 26, 1990	Osage City, Kansas	A woman is trapped in a burning car in front of her sister's house after being accidentally rear-ended by her cousin, and bystanders risk their own lives to save her.	Approximate location of crash on Google Street View
"Tampa Docu"	May 30, 1990	Tampa, Florida	A drunk man holds his four-year-old son hostage (Docu segment).	
"Lightning Lads"	July 24, 1987	Gulfport, Mississippi	A girl calls 911 when her brother and his friend are hit by lightning while sitting under a tree.	
"Mattress Mayhem"	February 11, 1990	Beaverton, Oregon	A teenage girl is pinned to the wall by a sofa and screams for help, but everyone thinks she's being attacked.	

==== Episode 2.5 (October 23, 1990) ====
Title	Event date	Event location	Description	External links
"Heart Attack Teacher"	May 9, 1988	Tipp City, Ohio	A beloved teacher has a heart attack during study hall and two of his former students are the responding paramedics.	Location of Tippecanoe High School on Google Street View
"Philly Docu"	July 1, 1990	Philadelphia, Pennsylvania	A fire in a residential hotel leaves a man trapped on the tenth floor.	Approximate location of Milner Hotel (where fire occurred) on Google Street View
"Yellow Jacket Attack"	August 20, 1989	Norristown, Pennsylvania	A man suffers an allergic reaction after being attacked by yellow jackets.	
"911 Babysitter Prowler"	January 14, 1989	Beaverton, Oregon	Burglars try to break in a house with a girl babysitting a baby inside, and no one knows the address.	

==== Episode 2.6 (October 30, 1990) ====
Title	Event date	Event location	Description	External links
"911 Spider Bite"	June 2, 1990	Las Vegas, Nevada	A woman suffers an allergic reaction to a bite from a black widow spider.	
"Trailer Fire"	November 19, 1988	Milltown, Idaho	A neighbor comes to the rescue when a man and his two children are trapped in a burning trailer.	
"911 Bank Rob Recovery"	April 11, 1990	Miami, Florida	A man follows a bank robber and calls 911 on his car phone, and police manage to catch the robber due to dye from exploding dye packs.	Location of robbery (Southeast Bank, now Wells Fargo Bank) on Google Street View
"Pond Boy"	April 29, 1990	Rushville, Indiana	A boy falls in a pond and drowns while fishing with his brother.	Approximate location of pond on Google Street view

==== Episode 2.7 (November 6, 1990) ====
Title	Event date	Event location	Description	External links
"Pacoima Cliff Safe"	November 20, 1988	Pacoima, California	Three teens are stranded on a cliff.	Rescue site on Google Street View
"American River"	1982	American River, California	A man is pinned underwater by a boulder (repeat from Episode 1.3).	
"Trading Places"	May 3, 1982	Essex, Vermont	A paramedic lets an escaped prisoner take him hostage so that he will release an elderly couple.	
"Hot Dog Heimlich"	June 16, 1990	Loveland, Ohio	A boy chokes on a hot dog while being babysat, and the babysitter saves him using the Heimlich maneuver.	

==== Episode 2.8 (November 13, 1990) ====
- TV Listings indicate that the original airing of this episode included a segment about a Portland, Oregon man who broke through two windows to save his infant son from a house fire. However, all repeats of this episode exclude that segment and show "Smoke-Filled House" from Episode 1.8 in its place.

Title	Event date	Event location	Description	External links
"Daytona"	February 11, 1990	Daytona Beach, Florida	A paramedic treating an injured race car driver is struck by another race car.	Location of Daytona International Speedway on Google Street View
"Smoke-Filled House"	December 1986	Olympia, Washington	A woman is trapped in her burning house (repeat from Episode 1.8).	
"911 Smart Boy"	October 1, 1989	Elkhart, Indiana	A young boy calls 911 when an intruder breaks into his house and sexually assaults his mother.	
"Digitalis Kid O.D."	December 4, 1986	Windham, Connecticut	A toddler takes her great grandmother's Digoxin.	

==== Episode 2.9 (November 20, 1990) ====
Title	Event date	Event location	Description	External links
"Car Stripper"	July 27, 1989	Prospect Park, Pennsylvania	When police officers are struggling to arrest a car thief, the thief shoots one of the officers with his own gun.	Shooting location on Google Street View
"Tornado Trap"	June 2, 1990	Harrison, Ohio	A tornado demolishes a neighborhood during a major outbreak, and a firefighter's in-laws are trapped beneath the rubble.	
"911 Alligator Alley"	April 16, 1990	Broward County, Florida	A woman goes into labor at a service station in a desolate area along Alligator Alley.	Service station on Google Street View

==== Episode 2.10 (November 27, 1990) ====
Title	Event date	Event location	Description	External links
"Phoenix Flood"	August 15, 1990	Phoenix, Arizona	A truck is stranded in the middle of a flooded wash.	Location of stranded truck (intersection of 35th Avenue and West Pinnacle Peak Road) on Google Street View
"Teen Car Crash"	April 27, 1989	Manassas, Virginia	A teen is seriously injured in a joyriding crash.	
"Bingo"	September 6, 1987	Elizabethtown, Kentucky	A police dog rescues a woman who was shot and left in the woods for dead by her husband (re-runs indicated that she later died of complications from her injuries).	

==== Episode 2.11 (December 4, 1990) ====
Title	Event date	Event location	Description	External links
"911 Child Asthma"	March 1, 1990	Omaha, Nebraska	A boy stops breathing when he suffers an asthma attack at night.	
"Psychic Cop"	April 4, 1988	Knoxville, Tennessee	A cop dreams that his wife dies in a car wreck, and then he crashes himself during a pursuit.	
"Potomac River"	April 28, 1990	Arlington, Virginia	A man drowns while trying to walk across a river.	Approximate location of drowning on Google Street View
"Houston Trauma Docu"		Houston, Texas	A stabbing victim and a baby injured in a car crash are treated at Ben Taub General Hospital (Docu segment) (repeat from the Pilot episode).	

==== Episode 2.12 (December 18, 1990) ====
Title	Event date	Event location	Description	External links
"Loggers Baby"	December 7, 1989	Klamath Falls, Oregon	Two loggers find an abandoned baby in the wilderness.	Approximate location where baby was found on Google Street View News article from KOBI-TV 5 (NBC affiliate in Medford, Oregon area) about incident
"911 Dialing Dog"	July 19, 1990	Ridgecrest, California	A dog calls 911 when it gets tangled in a telephone cord while its owners are out of town.	
"Firefighter Heart Attack"	May 21, 1990	New Canaan, Connecticut	While heading to a fire, a fire captain suffers a heart attack behind the wheel of his truck and it almost crashes.	Newspaper article about the incident: Page 1, Page 2
"Santa Save"	December 13, 1988	Phoenix, Arizona	A motorist dressed as Santa Claus performs the Heimlich Maneuver on a choking child in the car next to him.	Location of incident (intersection of 59th Avenue and West Indian School Road) on Google Street View

==== Episode 2.13 (January 1, 1991) ====
Title	Event date	Event location	Description	External links
"Snowmobile Save"	March 17, 1989	Fremont County, Idaho	A snowmobiler crashes into a tree.	Location of Island Park (approximate location of incident) on Google Street View
"Las Vegas Docu"	December 31	Las Vegas, Nevada	LVMPD officers on New Year's Eve duty	
"911 Arm Save"	October 24, 1989	Redlands, California	When a teen tries to hang a picture over her window in her bedroom at her grandparents' house, she falls through the glass and cuts both arms.	
"Cop Saves Dog"	December 14, 1989	Shelton, Connecticut	A Dalmatian chokes on a toy ball and a policeman gives him CPR.	

==== Episode 2.14 (January 8, 1991) ====
Title	Event date	Event location	Description	External links
"Sand Tunnel Boy"	July 4, 1990	Mattituck, New York	A boy digs a tunnel in the sand on the beach and gets trapped when it collapses on him.	Approximate location of incident at Veterans Beach on Google Street View
"911 Diabetic Dad"	July 29, 1990	El Cajon, California	A girl calls 911 when her father goes into insulin shock.	
"Hurt Highway Lt."	January 19, 1988	Greenwich, Connecticut	A police officer loses his leg when he is struck by a car while guiding traffic.	Approximate location of incident on Google Street View
"Washer Baby"	February 21, 1987	Port St. Lucie, Florida	A baby girl nearly drowns in a washing machine.	

==== Episode 2.15 (January 22, 1991) ====
Title	Event date	Event location	Description	External links
	May 4, 1990	Plainfield, Indiana	A car crash occurs that leaves no trace of its occurrence, injures a teenage girl, and her young son goes missing.	
"Fancy Dancer"	July 29, 1988	St. Louis, Missouri	A woman suffers a heart attack while at a dance club.	Location of Casa Loma Ballroom on Google Street View
"Elvis Docu (Kid)"		Memphis, Tennessee	A hanging victim is treated at Elvis Presley Memorial Trauma Center.	Location of Elvis Presley Memorial Trauma Center at Regional One Health Medical Center on Google Street View
"911 Choking Granny"	January 16, 1990	Vancouver, Washington	An elderly woman chokes on a dinner roll.	

==== Episode 2.16 (January 29, 1991) ====
Title	Event date	Event location	Description	External links
"Horseback Havoc"	January 7, 1990	Mount Pleasant, Texas	A horseback rider slams into a tree after his horse slips and throws him off.	
	January 15, 1990	Port Saint Lucie, Florida	A woman is caught in a rip tide, along with two men who attempt to rescue her.	Location of Waveland Beach on Google Street View Location of The Island Club Condominium Association on Google Street View
		Cleveland, Ohio	Two people injured in a car crash are taken by air ambulance to MetroHealth Medical Center.	Location of MetroHealth Medical Center on Google Street View
"Dispatcher Down"	August 21, 1990	Kingsland, Georgia	A dispatcher passes out during a party held at the dispatch center.	

==== Episode 2.17 (February 5, 1991) ====
Title	Event date	Event location	Description	External links
"Niagara River Rescue" (aka "Niagara Falls Rescue")	August 24, 1988	Niagara Falls, Ontario	Two women drift toward Niagara Falls after their boat enters a dangerous location.	Location of Niagara Falls on Google Street View
"911 Suicide Gun Save"	August 16, 1989	Seattle, Washington	A 911 dispatcher tries to convince a despondent man with a shotgun not to commit suicide.	
"Animal Docu"	July 23, 1990	Boston, Massachusetts	Veterinarians at Angell Memorial Hospital treat a cat hit by a car, a cat with liver disease, and a dog with nylon pantyhose stuck in its colon.	Location of Angell Memorial Hospital on Google Street View

==== Episode 2.18 (February 12, 1991) ====
Title	Event date	Event location	Description	External links
"Walkie Talkie Rescue"	July 24, 1990	Vancouver, British Columbia	A 63-year-old man falls 600 feet down the side of a mountain, and his grandson becomes stranded on a cliff when he tries to go for help, so he uses a walkie-talkie to raise the alarm.	
"Florida Keys Scuba" (aka "Florida Keys Scuba Save")	September 7, 1987	Florida Keys	An elderly woman suffers a heart attack while scuba diving with her husband.	
"Children's Docu"	August 7, 1990	Washington, D.C.	A boy injured in a motorcycle crash is treated at Children's National Medical Center (Docu Segment).	Location of Children's National Medical Center on Google Street View

==== Episode 2.19 (February 19, 1991) ====
Title	Event date	Event location	Description	External links
"River Tubing Rescue"	July 26, 1989	Chico, California	A teenage boy nearly drowns in the Sacramento River while river tubing.	Approximate location of near-drowning on Sacramento River on Google Street View Location of Scotty's Landing on Google Street View
"Bar Blast"	April 26, 1983	Cody, Wyoming	Three suspects flee the scene of a fatal bar shooting and open fire on pursuing police officers.	Location of Silver Dollar Bar on Google Street View
"911 Smoke-Filled Apartment"	August 5, 1988	Elizabeth, New Jersey	Firefighters search for a man trapped in a high-rise apartment on fire.	

==== Episode 2.20 (February 26, 1991) ====
Title	Event date	Event location	Description	External links
"Motel Toddler Plunge"	October 13, 1989	Hot Springs, Arkansas	A boy falls out the window of a hotel room and lands in a lake.	Location of SunBay Resort Hotel on Google Street View
"Runaway Truck"	January 14, 1984	Nova Scotia, Canada	A truck loses its brakes while traveling down a mountain road and another trucker helps slow him down.	Approximate location where trucks were stopped (near horseshoe curve) on Google Street View
"Gas Leak Baby"	July 9, 1990	Sherman, Texas	A woman is overcome by natural gas from an unlit stove, and it's up to her four-year-old son to get help.	
"Mallard Madness" *	June 17, 1990	Calgary, Alberta	A duck gets a six pack ring stuck around its neck.	

==== Episode 2.21 (March 5, 1991) ====
Title	Event date	Event location	Description	External links
"Hypo Hang Glider"	October 23, 1988	Lincoln City, Oregon	A hang glider is blown into the ocean.	Approximate location of incident at Cape Kiwanda on Google Street View
"Hurt Iowa Hiker"	August 28, 1988	Maquoketa Caves State Park, Iowa	A woman hiking with her boyfriend falls off a cliff and a boulder falls on her leg.	Approximate location of incident at Maquoketa Caves State Park on Google Street View
	July 28, 1990	Amherst, Ohio	Cleveland's Metro Life Flight transports victims injured at a stock car race to the hospital (Docu Segment).	Approximate location of Lorain County Speedway on Google Street View
"Brain Hemorrhage"	July 14, 1990	New Brunswick, New Jersey	A 5-year-old boy calls 911 when his mother is losing consciousness, but the operator who answered his call had received some prank calls from children earlier that day and almost doesn't believe him.	

==== Episode 2.22 (March 19, 1991) ====
- 50-minute episode
- Family Channel repeats of this episode included a repeat of the fire segment from Episode 1.9 as a filler segment to fill up the full hour time slot.

Title	Event date	Event location	Description	External links
	July 8, 1989	Black Butte Ranch, Deschutes County, Oregon	A teenage lifeguard drowns when his arm gets stuck in a pool drain as he tries to retrieve a pair of goggles.	Location of Lakeside Pool at Black Butte Ranch on Google Street View Location of incident re-enactment (Juniper Swim & Fitness Center) on Google Street View
	May 27, 1990	Tampa, Florida	Police officers after car thieves (docu segment).	
"Teen Angel"	June 8, 1990	Eaton County, Michigan	A piece of scrap metal falls off a truck and lands on an elderly couple's windshield, leaving the driver in critical condition, and it's up to a teenage girl to save his life.	Approximate location of crash on Google Street View

==== Episode 2.23 (March 26, 1991) ====
- 90-minute episode

Title	Event date	Event location	Description	External links
"Cobra Chaos"	November 20, 1989	Miami, Florida	A man is bitten by his pet Albino Asian cobra and the hospital that he is taken to does not have the antivenin that can save his life.	
"Cave Save"	October 28, 1990	Alabama	Rescuers must rapel to reach a man who fell into a cave.	
"Mailman Save"	December 18, 1985	Redlands, California	A mail carrier gives chase when a 2-year-old boy puts his mother's car in gear.	Event site on Google Street View
	May 14, 1990	Minneapolis, Minnesota	A father stabbed by his son and a woman injured in a collision with a drunk driver are treated at Hennepin County Medical Center (docu segment).	Location of Hennepin County Medical Center on Google Street View Approximate location of Dead Man's Curve crash on Google Street View
"Rock Climber"	May 12, 1990	Charlottesville, Virginia	A man falls off a cliff and his son performs first-aid on him.	Article about the re-enactment on the Charlottesville-Albemarle Rescue Squad's website

==== Episode 2.24 (April 2, 1991) ====
Title	Event date	Event location	Description	External links
"5-Year-Old Dad Save"	October 17, 1990	Palm Desert, California	A young girl calls 911 when her father (who was injured in a car crash years earlier) suffers a seizure in front of her.	
"Car Kidnap Baby"	June 21, 1987	Lafayette, Louisiana	An elderly couple rescue a baby who was kidnapped in her mother's stolen car.	Approximate location of Shell gas station where kidnapping occurred on Google Street View (Shell is no longer at that site)
"Austin Docu"	September 23, 1990	Austin, Texas	Crisis intervention team responds when a teenage boy reports a domestic dispute between his parents.	
"L.A. Superman"	February 14, 1990	Los Angeles, California	A drunk driver causes a crash that injures a teenage girl and her sister, and a bystander gives them first aid while chasing the perpetrator down as he tries to flee.	

==== Episode 2.25 (April 10, 1991) ====
Title	Event date	Event location	Description	External links
"911 Bathtub Baby"	August 30, 1988	Layton, Utah	When a baby drowns in a bathtub, his mother gives him CPR.	Deseret News article from April 7, 1991
"Sobering Save"	September 30, 1990	Mountain Center, California	Two park rangers pull a drunk driver from her burning pickup truck after she crashes.	Approximate location of crash on Google Street View
"Dog Saves Cop"	February 19, 1989	Los Angeles, California	A police dog is wounded in a shootout.	
"Bike Boy"	April 16, 1990	Worthington, Ohio	A 15-year-old bicyclist is hit by a car on his way home from a Boy Scout meeting.	Location of crash (intersection of Huntley Rd. and Shrock Rd.) on Google Street View

==== Episode 2.26 (April 26, 1991) ====
Title	Event date	Event location	Description	External links
"911 Break-In"	November 1, 1990	Madera, California	Teen burglars break in a house with a girl who is home from school with a sore throat.	
"Remarriage Rescue"	January 1989	San Jose, California	A teenage boy is nearly killed in a bicycle crash after riding downhill way too fast and without his helmet, and following his recovery, his divorced parents remarried after 8 years.	Approximate location of bicycle crash on Google Street View
"ATV Barbed Wire"	September 2, 1990	Nashville, Tennessee	A man on an ATV is snared on a barbed wire fence and subsequently his larynx is damaged rendering him unable to speak, but his life is saved by a hunting party who witnessed the crash.	

==== Episode 2.27 (April 30, 1991) ====
Title	Event date	Event location	Description	External links
"Terror in the Sky"	September 4, 1984	St. Petersburg, Florida	A pilot dies from a heart attack while flying a plane, and his wife, with no piloting skills, must take instructions via radio to land it.	
"Baby E.J.'s Burn"	January 11, 1990	Reno, Nevada	A toddler is severely burned when an electric skillet containing hot vegetable oil falls on him, and his grandmother burns her hands as a result of carrying him into the bathroom to cool him down.	
"Rocky Raccoon"	November 17, 1990	Shreveport, Louisiana	A raccoon gets its head stuck in a tree.	

==== Episode 2.28 (May 7, 1991) ====
Title	Event date	Event location	Description	External links
"Wolf Baby"	November 4, 1990	Louisville, Kentucky	When a pregnant woman goes into a cardiac arrest, the staff at the hospital find out that she has Wolff-Parkinson-White Syndrome.	
"Double Hero Down"	July 6, 1990	Golden, Colorado	When a hang glider crashes into a mountain, one of the rescuing firefighters falls down the cliff .	crash site on Google Street View
"911 Swordfish Save"	January 1991		A boy is stuck between a bathroom sink pedestal and a tub.	

==== Episode 2.29 (May 14, 1991) ====
Title	Event date	Event location	Description	External links
"Denver Chopper"	February 9, 1988	Denver, Colorado	A Channel 4 news chopper follows an escaping bank robber.	Robbery site on Google Street View
"Texas Pool Tot"	July 28, 1990	Keller, Texas	A young girl drowns in a swimming pool while her parents are busy doing yard work.	
"CHP Burning Car"	May 30, 1990	Santa Ana, California	A CHP officer pulls two men from a burning car following a crash.	Approximate location of incident on Google Street View Los Angeles Times article on event

=== Season 3 (1991–92) ===
- Season 3 consists of 27 episodes (26 original episodes and 1 episode containing a mix of new and repeat segments).
- This was Richard Stone's final season as music composer.

==== Episode 3.1 (September 17, 1991) ====
- Production Number: 301H
- 30-minute episode

Title	Event date	Event location	Description	External links
"Sinking Sisters"	November 30, 1990	Conroe, Texas	A station wagon with two toddlers inside rolls into a pond and their mother and witnesses try to help them while their brother calls 911.	
"Subway Save"	September 7, 1987	Manhattan, New York	A man suffers an epileptic seizure and falls onto the New York Subway tracks. See also: Wesley Autrey (hero in similar highly publicized incident)	Location of 50th Street IRT subway station on Google Street View Approximate location of incident at 50th Street IRT subway station on Google Street View Article from The New York Times (September 6, 1987) about incident

==== Episode 3.2 (September 24, 1991) ====
- Production Number: 302

Title	Event date	Event location	Description	External links
"Balloon Save"	January 7, 1990	Colorado Springs, Colorado; Elbert County, Colorado	An 11-year-old boy with ADHD is trapped alone in a runaway hot air balloon after the pilot falls out during a failed landing.	Approximate location where Alex's balloon ride started (N. Academy Blvd./Austin Bluffs Pkwy. intersection) on Google Street View Approximate location where Alex's balloon ride ended on Google Street View
"911 New York Fire"	July 15, 1990	Spencerport, New York	A local EMT gets trapped on the second floor of his burning house.	
"Civil War"	May 26, 1990	Felton, California	A man suffers a massive heart attack, his third, after participating in a Civil War reenactment.	Approximate location of incident at Roaring Camp on Google Street View

==== Episode 3.3 (October 1, 1991) ====
- Production Number: 303

Title	Event date	Event location	Description	External links
"Downhill Savior"	January 12, 1990	Copper Mountain, Colorado	A man suffers a heart attack while riding on a ski lift.	Location of Copper Mountain Ski Resort on Google Street View
"Sister Saves Siblings"	December 1990	Blowing Rock, North Carolina	A girl must take charge of her four younger siblings when their house catches fire while they are home alone.	
"911 Placenta Previa"	December 1990	Austin, Texas	A woman suffers a ruptured placenta during her 8th month of pregnancy.	Location of Cedar Chopper Festival (intersection of Ranch Road 1431 and U.S. 83) on Google Street View

==== Episode 3.4 (October 8, 1991) ====
- Production Number: 306H
- 30-minute episode

Title	Event date	Event location	Description	External links
"Log Pinned Baby"	October 23, 1990	Russellville, Arkansas	While a woman is driving her minivan in foggy conditions on a causeway on U.S. 64, she crashes into a log truck, leaving her baby daughter trapped.	Approximate location of crash on Google Street View
"Best Buddy Rescue"	February 24, 1991	Ruston, Louisiana	An 11-year-old boy saves his best friend after he accidentally hangs himself on a rope swing.	

==== Episode 3.5 (October 15, 1991) ====
- Production Number: 305

Title	Event date	Event location	Description	External links
"Carriage Mishap" (aka "Runaway Carriage")	January 27, 1991	Nazareth, Pennsylvania	A man is injured while riding in an antique carriage with his girlfriend.	Approximate location of crash on Google Street View
"911 Stalker Save"	May 17, 1990	Menlo Park, California	A woman is held captive in her home by her obsessed stalker, and it takes police hours to arrest the suspect.	
"Freeway the Fawn"	May 19, 1991	San Diego, California	A pregnant deer is struck by a car, and motorists stop to help her deliver her fawn.	Approximate location of crash on I-805 South on Google Street View
"Garage Door Kid"	September 25, 1984	Scottsbluff, Nebraska	A boy gets stuck under a garage door and is suffocated.	

==== Episode 3.6 (October 29, 1991) ====
- Production Number: 307

Title	Event date	Event location	Description	External links
"Lake Boy"	December 20, 1990	Englewood, Colorado	A boy falls into a frozen lake.	Location of Arapahoe Lake Reservoir on Google Street View
"911 Video Stabbing"	July 11, 1988	Bedford, Indiana	A video store owner is robbed as he closes his store, and one of the robbers stabs him.	Location of video store on Google Street View
"Cincinnati Neonatal Docu"		Cincinnati, Ohio	A baby with incompletely formed lungs, a baby with a Group B streptococcus infection, and a baby with a diaphragm defect are treated at University of Cincinnati Hospital's neo-natal care facilities.	Location of University of Cincinnati Medical Center on Google Street View

==== Episode 3.7 (November 5, 1991) ====
- Production Number: 308

Title	Event date	Event location	Description	External links
"Teen Gun Explosion"	September 3, 1989	Newberg, Oregon	A teen doing target practice with his friend is critically injured when a shotgun backfires on him.	
"911 Yellow Cab"	March 28, 1991	Indianapolis, Indiana	A middle aged couple is robbed in their house and one of the suspects tries to escape in a taxi.	
"St. Pete Docu"		St. Petersburg, Florida	Bay Flight helicopter responds to a head-on collision and an elderly woman who is fatally struck by a vehicle.	Location of Forrest Oaks Care Center (where head-on collision occurred) on Google Street View

==== Episode 3.8 (November 12, 1991) ====
- Production Number: 309
- The original broadcast of this episode was 45 minutes long and did not include the segment "911 Armed Robbery Recovery".
- "911 Armed Robbery Recovery" was first shown on an hour-long repeat of this episode (Production Number: 309R) that aired on June 23, 1992.

Title	Event date	Event location	Description	External links
"Three Parachutes"	November 12, 1989	Frankfort, Indiana	A skydiver must land with a small parachute after both his main parachutes fail.	Location of Frankfort Municipal Airport on Google Street View
"911 Armed Robbery Recovery"	December 2, 1989	San Angelo, Texas	A gunman robs a convenience store and leads police on a high-speed chase.	Location of Today's (now Stripes) Convenience Store where robbery occurred on Google Street View
"Runaway Car"	May 15, 1990	Tecumseh, Oklahoma	A woman is run over while trying to stop a runaway car with three children inside.	
"Gator Gulch"	August 2, 1991	Refugio, Texas	A boy is attacked by an alligator while swimming in the Mission River.	Location of Mission River on Google Street View

==== Episode 3.9 (November 19, 1991) ====
- Production Number: 310

Title	Event date	Event location	Description	External links
"Wing Walker"	June 15, 1991	Portland, Oregon	A wing walker falls and dangles beneath the plane at an airshow.	Location of Portland-Hillsboro Airport on Google Street View
"Russia Rescue"	September 17, 1990	Magadan, Siberia, Soviet Union; Galveston, Texas	A Russian boy is severely burned while making a bonfire with his friend, and then American doctors reach out to help him.	
"911 Rusty Burglar"	July 11, 1991	Los Angeles, California	A burglar is unable to get out of a restaurant after he breaks in through the ceiling.	Location of burglary (Arturo's Restaurant—now the site of Miches De La Baja) on Google Street View

==== Episode 3.10 (November 26, 1991) ====
- Production Number: 311

Title	Event date	Event location	Description	External links
"N.Y. Double Roof Rescue"	May 14, 1991	Manhattan, New York	Firefighters from Rescue Company 1 extract two men from the 12th floor of a burning building in Times Square using ropes suspended from the roof. The rescue unit was led by Lieutenant Patrick Brown.	Approximate location of fire on Google Street View
"Oakland Docu"		Oakland, California	A cabbie is shot, and rescuers cannot find him because they don't know where he is.	
"Back Seat Baby"	May 3, 1990	Lake Charles, Louisiana	A man must deliver his wife's baby in the back seat of their car when he cannot get her to the hospital before she gives birth.	

==== Episode 3.11 (December 10, 1991) ====
- Production Number: 312

Title	Event date	Event location	Description	External links
"Regatta Rescue"	December 2, 1990	Lake Monroe, Sanford, Florida	A man nearly drowns when his sailboat flips over during a race and his leg gets caught in its steel cables.	Approximate location of incident on Lake Monroe on Google Street View Orlando Sentinel article (May 23, 1991) about incident and re-enactment
"Brother Hostage"	November 10, 1989	Newington, Connecticut	A mentally ill man holds his two brothers hostage, claiming they are wanted by the FBI.	
"Running Senior Save"	August 9, 1990	Shippensburg, Pennsylvania	An elderly man collapses while running in a race.	Satellite view of Seth Grove Stadium at Shippensburg University Location of Seth Grove Stadium on Google Street View
"Freezer Tongue"	August 16, 1991	Altoona, Pennsylvania	A teenage boy gets his tongue stuck in the freezer while babysitting his niece.	

==== Episode 3.12 (December 17, 1991) ====
- Production Number: 313

Title	Event date	Event location	Description	External links
"Plowed Under"	January 11, 1988	Jackson, Wyoming	An avalanche buries a snow plow with its operator trapped inside.	Approximate location of incident on Google Street View
	August 26, 1989	Fort Collins, Colorado	A man is trapped in a burning pickup with a case of fireworks after he crashes off a highway.	Approximate location of crash on Google Street View
"Snowgirl Save"	December 23, 1990	Elkins, West Virginia	A young girl wanders outside and passes out in the snow.	Greensboro News & Record article (December 27, 1990) about incident Deseret News article (December 27, 1990) about incident Los Angeles Times article (December 28, 1990) about incident AP News article (December 28, 1990) about incident Article from UPI (December 28, 1990) about incident

==== Episode 3.13 (January 7, 1992) ====
- Production Number: 314

Title	Event date	Event location	Description	External links
"Blacked-Out Driver"	April 11, 1990	Pekin, Illinois	An ambulance crew is traveling during a non-emergency when they encounter a car with a child inside being driven erratically, and they take action to stop it; it turns out to be a mother who had suffered an epileptic seizure.	Approximate location where car was stopped on Google Street View
"Gas Thief"	May 7, 1989	Tonopah, Nevada	An escaped fugitive shoots a police officer in a shootout, then the suspect is fatally shot by the officer's best friend.	
"5-Year-Old Saves Mom" (aka "Stephanie Saves Mom")	May 6, 1991	Dearborn Heights, Michigan	A woman suffers a gallbladder attack while home with her two small children.	
"San Francisco Docu"	December 31	San Francisco, California	New Year's Eve documentary focuses on a shooting victim and a man who fell while climbing a Christmas tree.	

==== Episode 3.14 (January 14, 1992) ====
- Production Number: 315

Title	Event date	Event location	Description	External links
"RN Rough River" (aka "RN's Rough River Ride" )	July 3, 1990	Valdez, Alaska	A raft with six vacationing nurses on it capsizes in 36 degree whitewater.	Approximate location of incident on Lowe River on Google Street View
"Stop Drop II" (aka "Stop, Drop, and Roll 2")	February 12, 1990	Aurora, Illinois	A boy's clothes catch fire when he pours gasoline on smoldering leaves.	
"Bootless Hero"	November 21, 1990	North Lauderdale, Florida	A crash in the Everglades leaves a drunk driver in critical condition as his friend runs over ten miles for help.	

==== Episode 3.15 (January 24, 1992) ====
- Production Number: 316

Title	Event date	Event location	Description	External links
"Ice Dive Rescue"	March 1988	Logan, Utah	An ice diver's regulator fails while underwater.	Approximate location of incident at Bear Lake on Google Street View
"911 Snake Baby"	July 4, 1991	St. Tammany Parish, Louisiana	A cottonmouth bites a baby in the foot during the family's Fourth Of July picnic.	
"Newark Docu"	February 24, 1991	Newark, New Jersey	A deaf stabbing victim is treated at a trauma center.	Location of University Hospital on Google Street View
"Peeved Preschooler"	December 4, 1990	Santa Barbara, California	A runaway four-year-old calls 911 from a phone booth and the Santa Barbara County Sheriff's Department, telephone company, and California Highway Patrol join forces to find him and bring him home.	

==== Episode 3.16 (January 28, 1992) ====
- Production Number: 317

Title	Event date	Event location	Description	External links
"Chocolate Chip Rescue"	November 27, 1989	Cape Elizabeth, Maine	A teenage girl suffers an allergic reaction to walnuts in a chocolate chip cookie.	
"911 Fast Food Robbery"	April 18, 1991	Bakersfield, California	A fast food employee surreptitiously calls police during a robbery.	Robbery site on Google Street View
"Cannonball Kid"	May 1991	Greenville, South Carolina	A teenage boy suffers a spinal cord injury when he accidentally dives into the shallow end of a backyard pool.	
"911 Gotta Get to School"	May 29, 1991	Douglasville, Georgia	A girl calls 911 when her diabetic dad passes out.	

==== Episode 3.17 (February 4, 1992) ====
- Production Number: 318

Title	Event date	Event location	Description	External links
"Go-Kart Girl"	March 4, 1988	Lilburn, Georgia	A truck hits two girls on a go-kart and one of the girls is critically injured.	Approximate location of crash on Google Street View
"Ando the Dog"	September 19, 1988	Indianapolis, Indiana	A police dog is shot and killed during a standoff with an armed hit-and-run driver.	
"Fireman Down"	October 10, 1990	Santa Ana, California	Firefighters are hit by a falling facade while fighting a tire store fire.	Location of intersection where BF Goodrich tire store fire occurred on Google Street View
"6-Year-Old Hero"	July 9, 1991	Evansville, Indiana	A mother passes out while driving, and her 6-year-old son stops the truck.	Approximate location on IN-66 where truck was stopped on Google Street View

==== Episode 3.18 (February 7, 1992) ====
- Production Number: 954
- The two new segments from this episode ("EMT Husband Save" and "Freon Freak") were originally scheduled to air on October 15, 1991, as a 30-minute episode to accommodate Game 6 of the 1991 American League Championship Series. However, Game 6 was not needed, so CBS reverted to its regularly scheduled programming that night and aired Episode 3.5 (a full hour episode) instead.

Title	Event date	Event location	Description	External links
"EMT Husband Save"	August 23, 1989	South Orange, New Jersey	A cop is shot by a burglar and his wife is a paramedic on the scene.	
"Freon Freak"	March 10, 1990	Kernersville, North Carolina	A boy accidentally inhales freon from an air mattress.	
"Pesky Python"	August 1989	Fort Lauderdale, Florida	A couple discovers a 20-foot python living under their house (Repeat from Episode 1.22).	
"Rescuers Rescue"	October 1, 1989	Macon, Georgia	An ambulance en route to an emergency is in a crash (Repeat from Episode 1.28).	Location of Macon Memorial Park (approximate location of crash) on Google Street View

==== Episode 3.19 (March 3, 1992) ====
- Production Number: 319

Title	Event date	Event location	Description	External links
"Box Canyon Rescue"	February 14, 1991	Mount Shasta, California	A firefighter must treat his 17-year-old daughter who fell 100 feet off a cliff.	
"911 Date Rape"	September 21, 1989	Grand Island, Nebraska	A woman stabbed and assaulted on a rural road breaks into a farmhouse and calls 911 for help, while a manhunt occurs for her assailant.	
"Fernie's Heart" (aka "Fernie's Heart Transplant")	May 1988	Loma Linda, California	A boy is badly in need of a new heart.	

==== Episode 3.20 (March 17, 1992) ====
- Production Number: 320

Title	Event date	Event location	Description	External links
"Heart Attack Crash"	July 20, 1989	South Bend, Indiana	A paramedic's father suffers a heart attack in a church, and the ambulance crashes after being hit by a speeding driver on the way to the hospital.	Location of Faith United Methodist Church (where heart attack occurred) on Google Street View
"Black Belt Hostage"	March 19, 1990	Passaic, New Jersey	When a woman is taken hostage at a computer training school by her ex-boyfriend, she is rescued by his best friend, who is a police officer.	Location of incident (Passaic Arts and Science Charter School Middle) on Google Street View
"Electrocuted Teen"	June 9, 1991	Columbia, South Carolina	A 15-year-old boy is accidentally electrocuted while building a boat lift with his father and grandfather.	
"Elvis Docu II"	August 18, 1990	Memphis, Tennessee	A shooting victim is treated at Elvis Presley Memorial Trauma Center.	Location of Elvis Presley Memorial Trauma Center at Regional One Health Medical Center on Google Street View

==== Episode 3.21 (March 24, 1992) ====
- Production Number: 321

Title	Event date	Event location	Description	External links
"911: He's Not an Officer"	September 3, 1991	Chapel Hill, North Carolina	A woman suspects a motorist flashing a badge is a police impostor and she turns him in.	Hospital (arrest location) on Google Street View
"Iron Jockey"	May 30, 1988	Elmont, New York	Three jockeys are involved in a horse racing accident and one, Richard Migliore, is critically injured.	Location of Belmont Park on Google Street View
"White Eagle Impalement"	January 3, 1991	Maple Valley, Washington	A woman crashes her car while driving to work on an icy road and gets a fence post lodged in her neck.	Location of crash on Google Street View
"Daughter in a Tree"	October 31, 1991	Atlanta, Georgia	A girl gets stuck in a tree.	

==== Episode 3.22 (April 7, 1992) ====
- Production Number: 322

Title	Event date	Event location	Description	External links
"Burning Jeep Pin"	February 2, 1991	Paso Robles, California	A head-on collision leaves a 17-year-old girl trapped in her burning car.	Approximate location of crash on Google Street View
"Felon Follow"	December 4, 1989	Knoxville, Tennessee	A retired couple witnesses the aftermath of a bank robbery, then follows the suspects as they switch getaway cars; a shootout ensues when the police arrive.	Bank area from the start of the episode on Google Street View; McDonald's location seen briefly in the episode on Google Street View; Robbery location on Google Street View; News story of event
"911 Heart O' Glass"	August 13, 1991	Renton, Washington	A girl crashes through her grandparents' glass storm door and gets a shard of glass lodged in her heart.	

==== Episode 3.23 (April 28, 1992) ====
- Production Number: 323

Title	Event date	Event location	Description	External links
"Ex-RN Son Save"	June 24, 1987	Knoxville, Tennessee	A retired nurse encounters a car crash and discovers that one of the crash victims is her son.	
"911 My Baby Drowned"	October 3, 1991	Merlin, Oregon	A baby drowns in an above-ground pool.	
"Tucson Victim Docu"		Tucson, Arizona	A restaurant employee becomes partially paralyzed following a shooting.	
"Collapsed School Bus" (aka "Collapsed School Bus Driver")	December 18, 1991	Dunnellon, Florida	A 12-year-old boy with ADHD stops a school bus after the driver passes out.	Location of Dunnellon Middle School on Google Street View Ocala Star-Banner article (April 14, 1992) about incident South Florida Sun-Sentinel article (December 21, 1991) about incident Tampa Bay Times article (December 21, 1991) about incident Article from The New York Times (December 21, 1991) about incident Greensboro News & Record article (December 20, 1991) about incident

==== Episode 3.24 (April 29, 1992) ====
- Production Number: 324Q
- 15-minute episode

Title	Event date	Event location	Description	External links
"University Pipe Bomb"	March 28, 1991	Lawrence, Kansas	University police officers witness a pipe bomb being left under a car.	Bombing location on Google Street View

==== Episode 3.25 (May 5, 1992) ====
- Production Number: 304H
- 30-minute episode

Title	Event date	Event location	Description	External links
"Fire Ant Trauma"	April 7, 1991	Macon, Georgia	A toddler suffers an allergic reaction when bitten by fire ants.	
"Spiderman Rescue"	January 8, 1991	South River, New Jersey	A good Samaritan risks his life to save a woman trapped in a burning apartment building who refuses to leave without her pets.	

==== Episode 3.26 (May 12, 1992) ====
- International Edition
- Production Number: 325

Title	Event date	Event location	Description	External links
"New Zealand Tanker Fire"	August 9, 1990	Auckland, New Zealand	A tanker truck crashes into a parked car and explodes, leaving a 12-year-old girl pinned under the blazing inferno.	Approximate location of crash on Google Street View Article from The Cairns Post (October 11, 2015) about incident Article from Reader's Digest (January 1, 2019) about incident
"French Parasailing"		Chamonix, France	A woman's parachute catches onto a crane while paragliding, leaving her dangling high above the ground.	
"Truck vs. Train"	May 27, 1991	Onalaska, Wisconsin	When the burglar alarm goes off at a fishing shop across the railroad tracks, the owner tries to stop the robber but is hit by a train when he speeds through a crossing.	Location of train tracks on Google Street View
"Sinking Snowmobile"	February 1, 1990	Huntsville, Ontario	A man's snowmobile falls through the ice with him and his 6-year-old son aboard.	

==== Episode 3.27 (May 19, 1992) ====
- Production Number: 326

Title	Event date	Event location	Description	External links
"Mountain Glacier"	May 13, 1989	Central Oregon	Two men fall down a glacier leaving one with a dislocated knee and the other in critical condition.	Approximate location of incident at North Sister on Google Street View
"911 Self Inflicted Wound"	November 15, 1990	Kalama, Washington	A dispatcher attempts to talk a woman out of suicide.	
"Boomer's Rescue"	December 29, 1991	Vandalia, Illinois	A dog belonging to a girl battling cancer is trapped inside a burning house. Syndicated reruns show an update that she died (She was alive when the episode originally aired).	
"13-Year-Old Heimlich"	February 8, 1991	Downey, California	A teen performs the Heimlich maneuver when his younger cousin chokes on cereal.	

=== Season 4 (1992–93) ===
- Season 4 consists of 28 original episodes (one of which was postponed from Season 3).
- Stu Goldberg became one of the show's music composers, and continued in that role until the show ended in 1996.

==== Episode 4.1 (September 15, 1992) ====
- "100 Lives Saved"
- Production Number: 401

Title	Event date	Event location	Description	External links
"Good Samaritan Save"	October 17, 1991	Stillwater, Oklahoma	A teenage girl and her friend are in an automobile crash and a good Samaritan stops to help when one of them stops breathing due to an asthma attack.	Approximate location of crash on Google Street View Tulsa World article (September 15, 1992) about incident and re-enactment Article from The Oklahoman (July 20, 1992) about incident and re-enactment
"St. Louis Gas Leak" (aka "St. Louis Gas Save")	December 19, 1989	St. Louis, Missouri	A family suffers carbon monoxide poisoning and while at the hospital, Rescue 911 happens to be on with an episode of carbon monoxide poisoning, hinting them to rush home to the kids at the house.	
"Siblings Save Gram" (aka "Siblings Save Grandma")	March 10, 1992	Salcedo, Missouri	An 8-year-old performs the Heimlich maneuver on his great grandmother when she chokes on a piece of chicken, and his sister calls 911.	Newspaper article about the incident
"Teen Bullet"	September 24, 1991	Fairfax, South Carolina	A teenage boy playing with a gun accidentally shoots himself.	
"Stevie Saves Dad"	April 20, 1990	Indianapolis, Indiana	A 5-year-old boy calls 911 when his father falls down a flight of stairs.	

==== Episode 4.2 (September 22, 1992) ====
- Production Number: 402

Title	Event date	Event location	Description	External links
"Drainage Ditch"	September 16, 1991	Arlington, Texas	A girl is swept into a storm drain channel.	Location of storm drain channel on Google Street View
"Point Dume Drop"	March 15, 1989	Malibu, California	While three college students climb up a high cliff, one of them falls down the cliff and is critically injured.	Location of Point Dume on Google Street View
		Denver, Colorado	Various cases at Denver General Hospital.	Location of Denver General Hospital (now Denver Health Medical Center) on Google Street View
"Babysitter Down"	April 18, 1992	Naperville, Illinois	A 15-year-old girl passes out while babysitting, and her charge calls 911.	

==== Episode 4.3 (September 29, 1992) ====
- Production Number: 403

Title	Event date	Event location	Description	External links
"Aussie Whale Save"	August 16, 1991	Peregian Beach, Queensland	Attempts to return a beached whale to the sea.	Location of Peregian Beach on Google Street View
"Roller Coaster Rescue"	September 2, 1991	Altoona, Pennsylvania	When the Little Leaper at Lakemont Park has trouble working, the 17-year-old operator tries to make it go with a little girl on the ride, but gets his leg mangled when the ride drags him.	Satellite view of Lakemont Park Location of Lakemont Park on Google Street View Map of Lakemont Park on lakemontparkfun.com
"911 Kids in Smoke"	August 29, 1991	Huntington Beach, California	Two siblings get trapped inside their burning home when the younger one accidentally sets fire to one of his toys.	
"Laundry Chute Lad"	May 3, 1992	Columbia, South Carolina	A 7-year-old boy playing hide and seek gets stuck in a laundry chute.	

==== Episode 4.4 (October 27, 1992) ====
- Production Number: 406

Title	Event date	Event location	Description	External links
"Heroic Trucker"	January 5, 1991	Columbus, Ohio	A pregnant woman driving her husband's pickup truck slides off an icy highway and ends up in a river, and a semi driver tries to save her and her baby.	Approximate location of crash on Google Street View
"Garage Door Fire Pin"	February 28, 1991	Glen Ellyn, Illinois	Clothes under a dryer in a garage catch fire, and the flames short out the garage door opener button, trapping a young girl inside.	Chicago Tribune article (March 1, 1991) about incident
"Phoenix Flood II"	August 22, 1992	Phoenix, Arizona	A woman is stranded in her car in the middle of a flooded road.	
"911 Toddler Glass Save"	October 18, 1991	Fresno, California	A pregnant woman's daughter crashes through the window when she tips her chair back too far.	

==== Episode 4.5 (November 10, 1992) ====
- Production Number: 407

Title	Event date	Event location	Description	External links
"Avalanche Friend"	February 19, 1990	East Layton, Utah	Skiers trapped in an avalanche.	Approximate location of rescue on Google Street View
"Idaho Trooper Down"	June 15, 1991	Minidoka, Idaho	A state trooper is shot by a car thief during a seemingly routine traffic stop and a family of good Samaritans come to his rescue.	Approximate location of incident on Google Street View Newspaper article on the segment
"L.A. Children's Hospital Docu"		Los Angeles, California	A boy with a gunshot wound and a boy injured in a bicycle crash are treated at Children's Hospital Los Angeles.	Location of Children's Hospital Los Angeles on Google Street View

==== Episode 4.6 (November 17, 1992) ====
- Women Heroes Edition
- Production Number: 408

Title	Event date	Event location	Description	External links
"911 Unwanted Intruder"	March 18, 1992	Salt Lake City, Utah	When a middle aged woman's husband leaves for work and leaves her home alone, a burglar breaks in her house.	
"Sister Stop, Drop, Roll"	December 27, 1991	Hemet, California	A girl catches fire from the kitchen stove while trying to cook some oatmeal and her sister must perform stop, drop and roll.	
"Las Vegas Docu II"		Las Vegas, Nevada	Two college boys are hit by a drunk driver, killing one and critically injuring the other.	
"911 Woodshop Trauma"	September 10, 1991	Rancho Cordova, California	A man cuts his wrist with a power saw while building furniture.	Location of The Redwood Shop on Google Street View
"11-Year-Old CPR Save"	July 16, 1991	Westerville, Ohio	A toddler boy drowns in a swimming pool.	

==== Episode 4.7 (November 24, 1992) ====
- Production Number: 405H
- 30-minute episode

Title	Event date	Event location	Description	External links
"Security Bar Save"	March 14, 1991	Detroit, Michigan	A family's house catches fire, and security bars over a window trap a man and his 2-year-old daughter inside.	
"BB Gun Blast"	September 12, 1989	Rio Vista, California	A 17-year-old boy accidentally shoots a 6-year-old boy with a BB gun, which he mistakenly thought was empty.	

==== Episode 4.8 (November 25, 1992) ====
- Production Number: 327
- This episode was postponed from the third season. It was originally scheduled to air May 1, 1992.

Title	Event date	Event location	Description	External links
"Purgatory Chasm"	April 7, 1991	Sutton, Massachusetts	A Russian immigrant falls off a cliff.	Approximate location of incident at Purgatory Chasm State Reservation on Google Street View
"911 Firecracker Explosion"	October 30, 1991	Fresno, California	When a boy tries to stop a firecracker from exploding, it does so in his hand and blows his fingers off.	
"Runaway Dogsled"	December 24, 1991	North Pole, Alaska	When a 3-year-old girl is pulled away in a dog sled, her father and two off-duty medics attempt to locate her and the dogs.	Location of train tracks where dogsled was stopped on Google Street View
	December 5, 1991	Miami, Florida	Shooting victim.	

==== Episode 4.9 (December 8, 1992) ====
- Production Number: 409

Title	Event date	Event location	Description	External links
"Lake Mead Ultralight"	August 17, 1991	Las Vegas, Nevada	An injured ultralight pilot is stranded on a lakeside cliff.	
"Jungleland"	March 8, 1992	Pinellas Park, Florida	A toddler is bitten by a rattlesnake while hiking with his family in the woods.	Approximate location of incident on Google Street View
"Sealant Overdose"	February 8, 1990	Kaysville, Utah	A 16-year-old boy goes into cardiac arrest from inhaling butane and Scotch Guard.	Location of Davis High School on Google Street View
"Sparkletts the Dalmatian"	February 3, 1991	Rosemead, California	A dog is rescued from a storm drain.	

==== Episode 4.10 (December 15, 1992) ====
- Production Number: 411

Title	Event date	Event location	Description	External links
"Three Men and a Little Girl"	June 11, 1991	Golden, Colorado	A mother and daughter are swept down the rapids of a creek.	Rescue site on Google Street View
"Brakeless Bus"	August 15, 1990	Montana	A bus transporting a group of firefighters down a mountain loses its brakes.	
"CO-Poisoned Family"	November 7, 1991	Roseville, Minnesota	A family receives carbon monoxide poisoning.	
"911 Santa Delivery"	December 24, 1991	Winston-Salem, North Carolina	A paramedic arrives to help a woman in labor while dressed as Santa Claus.	

==== Episode 4.11 (December 22, 1992) ====
- Production Number: 404H
- 30-minute episode

Title	Event date	Event location	Description	External links
"ATV Big Brother"	June 11, 1991	Fairbanks, Alaska	A boy is injured while riding on an ATV.	
"911 Kenny's Bathtub"	November 21, 1991	Redondo, Washington	A baby boy is accidentally left unattended in a bathtub.	

==== Episode 4.12 (January 5, 1993) ====
- Production Number: 412

Title	Event date	Event location	Description	External links
"New Orleans Docu" (II)	December 31, 1991; January 1, 1992	New Orleans, Louisiana	A mugger flees to the home of a family (docu segment).	
"Snow Tubing Save"	February 13, 1988	Laramie, Wyoming	A teenage girl becomes paralyzed in a snow tubing accident.	Approximate location of Happy Jack Recreation Area on Google Street View
"911 Abruptio Placenta" (aka "911, I'm Losing the Baby")	May 9, 1992	Fontana, California	An OB nurse has bleeding during her pregnancy.	
"Toppled Trans AM"	July 15, 1990	Guthrie, Kentucky	A man's car runs over him while he's working on it.	

==== Episode 4.13 (January 12, 1993) ====
- Production Number: 410

Title	Event date	Event location	Description	External links
"The Helicopter Horse"	May 17, 1992	Sierra Nevada, California	A helicopter rescues a horse injured in a fall from a cliff.	
"Mother Shooting"	May 28, 1991	Bowmanville, Ontario, Canada	A man tries to murder his estranged wife in a case of domestic violence, harming his daughter in the process.	
"Christmas Tree Fall"	November 1988	Salmon, Idaho	A teenager falls while trying to cut a Christmas tree.	

==== Episode 4.14 (January 19, 1993) ====
- Production Number: 413

Title	Event date	Event location	Description	External links
"Ski Heart Puncture"	March 4, 1989	Great Barrington, Massachusetts	A ski instructor punctures her heart after hitting a tree at Ski Butternut.	Location of Butternut Ski Area and Tubing Center on Google Street View Article from The Hartford Courant (January 8, 1993) about incident
"Oklahoma Cops Documentary"	August 4, 1991	Oklahoma City, Oklahoma	A community mourns an 18-year-old boy who is killed in a drive-by shooting.	Approximate location of drive-by shooting on Google Street View
"911 Cribbage Choke"	April 12, 1992	Honeoye, New York	A boy chokes on a cribbage game piece he placed in his mouth.	
"Bubba Saves Chewy"	July 6, 1992	St. Augustine, Florida	A dog gets trapped in a burning house while its owners are away, and the firefighter who rescues it performs CPR.	

==== Episode 4.15 (January 26, 1993) ====
- Production Number: 414

Title	Event date	Event location	Description	External links
"Mountain Pool Plunge"	August 26, 1991	Angel Falls, California	A man hits his head while trying to slide down a waterfall and drowns in the pool at the bottom.	Approximate location of incident at Willow Creek on Google Street View
"911 Market Robbery"	April 18, 1992	Roseville, California	A supermarket attendant calls 911 when his store is being robbed by four masked gunmen.	Robbery location on Google Street View (store is still Bel Air)
"Swiss Army Knife"	May 28, 1990	Memphis, Tennessee	An elderly British man chokes on a piece of meat while on board an airplane, and doctors on board use a Swiss army knife to perform an emergency operation.	
"Two-Year-Old Pool Save"	June 30, 1992	Englewood, Colorado	While moving into a new house, a girl saves her brother when he drowns in a backyard pool.	

==== Episode 4.16 (February 2, 1993) ====
- Production Number: 416

Title	Event date	Event location	Description	External links
"Comeback Kid"	November 10, 1989	Desert Springs, Arizona	A pastor's 12-year-old daughter is nearly killed after being run over by a car.	Location of Desert Springs Community Church on Google Street View
"Sporting Goods Heist"	December 21, 1991	Mesa, Arizona	Robbers shoot a sporting goods store owner and a witness helps the police catch the suspects.	Robbery location on Google Street View (no longer a sporting goods store)
"Potty Peril"	July 7, 1992	Port St. Lucie, Florida	A girl in potty training gets her foot stuck in a toilet.	
"Grapevine Fall"	April 16, 1991	Welch, West Virginia	A 17-year-old boy falls off a vine he is swinging on.	

==== Episode 4.17 (February 9, 1993) ====
- 100th Episode
- Production Number: 415

Title	Event date	Event location	Description	External links
"Hanging Hang Glider"	July 30, 1989	Sauratown Mountains near Winston-Salem, North Carolina	A man crashes his hang glider into the top of trees.	Short article about the incident and reenactment
"911 I've Been Shot"	August 19, 1991	Lawrence Township, Marion County, Indiana	A neighbor rapes and shoots a female lawyer.	
"Lady's Not a Tramp"	September 7, 1992	Loveland, Colorado	A rattlesnake bites a dog that tries to save a girl.	
"Balcony Fall"	April 10, 1992	Gulf Shores, Alabama	When a teenage girl tries to sneak out after curfew by climbing down a hotel balcony with her friend, she slips and falls.	Article from The Orlando Sentinel (April 18, 1992) about incident

==== Episode 4.18 (February 16, 1993) ====
- Production Number: 417

Title	Event date	Event location	Description	External links
"Maui Sand Trap"	August 18, 1992	Maui, Hawaii	A man and his 5-year-old daughter are trapped in their car when a truck filled with sand falls on top of it, and a firefighter's uncle saves the day with his crane.	
"911 Bank Capture"	February 6, 1991	Jacksonville, Florida.	A witness observes a bank robber during his getaway.	Robbery location on Google Street View
"NY Animal Docu"		New York, New York	Various animals are treated at a veterinary clinic.	
"911 Sucker Save"	June 5, 1992	Indianapolis, Indiana	A girl chokes on a sucker.	

==== Episode 4.19 (February 23, 1993) ====
- International Edition
- Production Number: 418

Title	Event date	Event location	Description	External links
"French Sky Diver"	August 3, 1976	Normandy, France	A skydiver is stuck to an airplane (This is the oldest story ever to be reenacted.).	
"Venezuela Cave Save"	July 13, 1991	Venezuela	A diver gets lost in an underwater cave.	
"Alpine Ski Crevasse"	April 4, 1991	Zermatt, Switzerland	A skier falls into a crack.	

==== Episode 4.20 (March 2, 1993) ====
- Production Number: 419H
- 30-minute episode

Title	Event date	Event location	Description	External links
"Hedge Trimmer Electrocution"	August 10, 1991	Cincinnati, Ohio	An expectant father suffers an electric shock from hedge trimmers.	
"Softball Slugger Save"	May 8, 1992	Hickory, Pennsylvania	A girl is hit in the head by a softball and knocked unconscious.	Link to Oliver v. Chartiers-Houston Athletic Association case

==== Episode 4.21 (March 9, 1993) ====
- Production Number: 420

Title	Event date	Event location	Description	External links
"911 Sister Abduction"	December 15, 1991	Vista, California	A girl watches as her sister gets kidnapped and has her dad call for help.	
"Falling Glass"	December 23, 1991	Wilsonville, Oregon	Loads of glass fall on top of a glass worker and pin him underneath.	
"911 Insulin Shock Dad"	June 10, 1992	Federal Way, Washington	A girl calls 911 when her diabetic father goes into insulin shock.	
"DUI Teen Driver"	March 1, 1987	Los Gatos, California	A teenager is in a drunk driving crash on his way home from a party.	Location of crash on Google Street View

==== Episode 4.22 (March 23, 1993) ====
- Production Number: 421

Title	Event date	Event location	Description	External links
"Racehorse Rescue"	January 27, 1992	Chesterland, Ohio	A horse is trapped in an overturned horse trailer after the truck towing it crashes on a highway.	
"911 Stabbing/Shooting"	July 3, 1992	Wolcott, Connecticut	An abusive man stabs his girlfriend when she runs to a neighbor's house to get help. He is later shot to death by a police officer.	
"911 Trunk Trapped Tot"	August 31, 1992	Brookfield, Connecticut	A 3-year-old boy locks himself in the trunk of his mother's car.	
"Nail Gun Heart"	February 22, 1992	El Cajon, California	A construction worker accidentally shoots his coworker in the heart with a nail gun.	

==== Episode 4.23 (March 30, 1993) ====
- Production Number: 422

Title	Event date	Event location	Description	External links
"Big Bear Plane Crash"	June 28, 1992	Big Bear Lake, California	An experimental aircraft crashes following the 1992 Big Bear earthquake	Satellite view of Big Bear Lake.
"Twin Drowning"	March 4, 1992	Shawnee, Kansas	Two twin boys drown in their backyard pool while their mother teaches a Bible class in their house.	
"Water Monitor Mayhem"	July 5, 1992	Miami, Florida	When a couple has car trouble while trying to leave for a birthday party, they discover that a lizard got stuck in the engine.	
"911 Accidental Gunshot"	April 18, 1992	Pinecrest, California	A teenage boy is accidentally shot by his best friend while on a camping trip.	

==== Episode 4.24 (April 13, 1993) ====
- Production Number: 423

Title	Event date	Event location	Description	External links
"High Voltage Save"	April 14, 1992	Calloway County, Kentucky	A man in a hurry to get to his college class crashes into power lines.	Newspaper article about the incident
"911 Ottawa Bank Bust"	March 11, 1992	Ottawa, Ontario	A fleeing bank robber shoots at a witness who pursues him and later takes two people hostage.	Location of TD Canada Trust Bank where robbery occurred on Google Street View (bank is no longer there)
"6th Grade CPR"	September 14, 1992	Bremerton, Washington	An elementary school teacher suffers a heart attack while teaching and one of his students performs CPR to save his life. One of the first responders is also a former student.	Location of Tracyton Elementary School on Google Street View (school closed in 2008 and was demolished in 2013) Article from Kitsap Sun (September 16, 1992) about incident Article from Kitsap Sun (September 23, 1992) about incident Article from Kitsap Sun (October 22, 1992) about incident and re-enactment Article from Kitsap Sun (October 30, 1992) about incident and re-enactment Article from Kitsap Sun (April 5, 1993) about incident and re-enactment
"Pittsburgh Transplant Doc"	December 1992	Pittsburgh, Pennsylvania	Organ transplant documentary.	Location of University of Pittsburgh Medical Center-Presbyterian Hospital on Google Street View

==== Episode 4.25 (May 4, 1993) ====
- Production Number: 424

Title	Event date	Event location	Description	External links
"Dive Buddy Rescue"	October 11, 1992	Florida Keys	A diver drowns while underwater.	
"1033 Officer Down"	July 6, 1991	Provo, Utah	A police officer is shot in a shootout after he and another officer were trying to confront two other suspects.	
"Escalator Traps Boy"	January 20, 1993	Calgary, Alberta	A young boy gets his clothes stuck in an escalator at Rundle Station and breaks his arm, while a teenager tries to save his life.	Location of Rundle Station on Google Street View
"911 It's a Boy"	April 25, 1992	Lawrenceville, Georgia	A woman who goes into labor cannot make it to the hospital.	

==== Episode 4.26 (May 11, 1993) ====
- Production Number: 425

Title	Event date	Event location	Description	External links
"Iceman Falleth"	February 5, 1992	Ouray, Colorado	An ice climber falls 60 feet while rappelling down Box Canyon.	Location of Box Canyon Park on Google Street View
"Patrol Car Fire Save"	September 17, 1991	Lago Vista, Texas	A family is trapped in their burning second-floor apartment.	
"911 Jagged Edge Rescue"	March 13, 1992	Grants Pass, Oregon	A former Navy soldier and his father save the boy next door when he cuts his arms from a broken window while playing tag.	
"A Defib Runs Through It"	November 1, 1992	Austin, Texas	While seeing A River Runs Through It in a movie theater, an elderly woman suffers a heart attack.	Location of movie theater (Regal Arbor Cinema @ Great Hills) on Google Street View

==== Episode 4.27 (May 18, 1993) ====
- Production Number: 426

Title	Event date	Event location	Description	External links
"Aussie Snakebite"	August 31, 1991	Mareeba, Queensland, Australia	A man is bitten by a taipan	
"Riding Mower Rescue"	June 7, 1991	Mountain Grove, Missouri	A child is injured by a ride-on mower	
"Mickey's Heart Transplant"		Alpine, Texas	A boy is awaiting a heart transplant	
"911 Blizzard Baby"	December 12, 1992	East Hartford, Connecticut	A woman gives birth during a blizzard	

==== Episode 4.28 (May 25, 1993) ====
- Child Safety Edition
- Production Number: 427

Title	Event date	Event location	Description	External links
"911 Whitney's Bus Crush"	November 4, 1991	Blountville, Tennessee	After getting home from school, a 5-year-old girl is run over by the school bus when she crawls under it to get a drawing that she made in school for her mother.	Location of Blountville Elementary School on Google Street View
"Bucket Drown Baby"	November 21, 1990	Lebanon, Oregon	An infant falls into a bucket of bleach and drowns.	
"No Helmet Horror"	October 9, 1989	Cheltenham, Pennsylvania	A girl is hit by a car while riding a bicycle.	
"D.C. Children's Documentary"		Washington, D.C.	Documentary at Children's National Medical Center featuring a toddler burned by grease and a young girl who accidentally swallowed lamp oil.	Location of Children's National Medical Center on Google Street View

=== Season 5 (1993–94) ===
- Season 5 consisted of 28 episodes (26 original episodes and 2 compilation episodes).

==== Episode 5.1 (September 14, 1993) ====
- Production Number: 501

Title	Event date	Event location	Description	External links
"Swarm Save"	June 4, 1990	Douglas, Georgia	A truck crash releases millions of honeybees and leaves an injured man trapped inside. Rescuers must endure the massive swarm while trying to free him, with one of them suffering an allergic reaction to the bee stings.	
"Convenience Store Hero"	July 21, 1992	Beaumont, Texas	A drag queen saves the day when a suicidal woman with a shotgun takes customers of a convenience store hostage.	
"Breakout Beagle"	December 21, 1992	Tualatin, Oregon	A dog gets its head stuck in a dryer vent, and a neighbor and his two boys try to help but have to call 911.	
"911 Nurse's Bathtub Baby"	June 10, 1991	Walla Walla, Washington	A baby drowns in a bathtub.	

==== Episode 5.2 (September 21, 1993) ====
- Production Number: 502

Title	Event date	Event location	Description	External links
"Train vs. Teens"	November 11, 1991	Seymour, Iowa	A 15-year-old and his aunt are hit by a train as he practices driving.	Location of train tracks (approximate location of collision) on Google Street View
"911 Lightning Husband"	September 5, 1991	Lakeside, California	A man is struck by lightning in his driveway while walking his dogs.	
"911 Cat Burglar"	March 25, 1993	San Clemente, California	When a man goes downstairs to investigate a break-in at his house, he discovers the intruder is a bobcat.	
"Penny Choke"	October 1990	Northlake, Illinois	A mentally challenged man performs the Heimlich maneuver on his nephew when he chokes on a penny.	

==== Episode 5.3 (September 28, 1993) ====
- Production Number: 503

Title	Event date	Event location	Description	External links
"New Daddy Crash"	March 21, 1991	Clackamas County, Oregon	Two men rescue a critically injured firefighter from his burning vehicle at the same time his wife, who is pregnant with twins, goes into labor.	Approximate location of incident on Google Street View
"Applebee's Hostage Crisis"	March 5, 1992	Greenville, North Carolina	A robber takes employees hostage at a restaurant.	Approximate location of Applebee's where incident occurred on Google Street View (that restaurant closed in 2018) Gregarious Drivers of Greensboro, NC, YouTube video about this incident
"Bella's Little Buddy"	July 6, 1992	Blythe, California	A dog gets help when a toddler falls into the Colorado River.	Location of Colorado River on Google Street View Newspaper article about the incident Page 1, Page 2 Link to the episode online
"San Diego Child Docu"	January 26, 1992	San Diego, California	Motorcycle crash.	Location of Sharp Memorial Hospital on Google Street View

==== Episode 5.4 (October 22, 1993) ====
- Production Number: 508

Title	Event date	Event location	Description	External links
"Quechee Gorge Rescue"	June 29, 1992	White River Junction, Vermont	A man falls off a cliff.	Location of Quechee Gorge on Google Street View
"Asphalt Trap"	April 23, 1990	Grafton, West Virginia	Liquid asphalt spills out onto an occupied car.	
"Carbon Monoxide Family"	November 4, 1992	Colorado Springs, Colorado	After a couple calls 911 for their ailing daughter, the fire department discovers the family has succumbed to carbon monoxide poisoning.	Article from Chicago Tribune (October 27, 2006) about incident and re-enactment
"Where's My Wife"	June 23, 1992	Napoleon, Indiana	When a woman is missing, her husband goes searching for her and discovers that she had a car crash, and the woman's brother and son are among the responding firefighters.	Approximate location of crash on Google Street View

==== Episode 5.5 (October 26, 1993) ====
- Production Number: 505

Title	Event date	Event location	Description	External links
"Australian Balloon Save"	October 2, 1990	Coolangatta, Queensland, Australia	A hot air balloon is blown out over the ocean by storm winds.	
"Have Gun Will Discharge"	January 21, 1992	Somerset, Kentucky	When a pastor returns home and discovers his home was burglarized, he is shot by the burglar.	
"Pinellas EMS Docu"	January 22, 1993	Pinellas County, Florida	Injured dog and motorcyclist.	Approximate location of motorcycle crash on Gulf to Bay Blvd. on Google Street View

==== Episode 5.6 (November 2, 1993) ====
- Production Number: 506

Title	Event date	Event location	Description	External links
"Anniversary Rafting Horror"	May 1992	Riggins, Idaho	A group of people are thrown from their raft in the rapids.	Approximate location of incident on Salmon River on Google Street View
"Hayloft Hanging Hazard"	March 1, 1993	Athol, Idaho	A girl is accidentally hung while playing on a rope in her family's barn.	
"911 Peanut Heimlich"	January 1, 1993	St. Catharines, Ontario	A toddler chokes on peanuts after he eats too many at once.	
"Motorcop Down"	June 1, 1991	Reno, Nevada	An officer crashes his police motorcycle during a high-speed chase.	Approximate location of crash on Google Street View

==== Episode 5.7 (November 9, 1993) ====
- Production Number: 509H
- 30 minute episode

Title	Event date	Event location	Description	External links
"Bumper Baby"	March 28, 1993	Wauconda, Illinois, Hawthorn Woods, Illinois	When a toddler is missing, drivers in other cars spot her hanging on the back of her dad's truck when he's on his way to work and they try in vain to pull him over as the mother desperately searches for her daughter.	Location where truck was stopped (intersection of North Fairfield Road and North Old McHenry Road) on Google Street View
"Dallas Cop Down"	November 13, 1991	Dallas, Texas	A police officer becomes paralyzed when he is shot by two escaped juvenile detention center inmates.	

==== Episode 5.8 (November 16, 1993) ====
- Production Number: 510

Title	Event date	Event location	Description	External links
"ATV 5-Year-Old"	July 1, 1992	Holland, Ohio	A 5-year-old boy's leg is mangled in an ATV crash.	Newspaper article about the incident and Rescue 911 segment
"911 Knoxville Intruder"	December 30, 1991	Knoxville, Tennessee	A woman hides in the bathroom and calls 911 when two intruders break-in and a cop tries to catch the suspects.	
"Tool Box Tumble"	March 24, 1993	Hamlet, Indiana	A boy is sandwiched between his father's toolbox and the hood of the family van in the garage but gets no injuries.	
"Bone Marrow Transplant"		Colorado Springs, Colorado	A baby boy suffers from bone marrow complications of aplastic anemia.	

==== Episode 5.9 (November 23, 1993) ====
- "200 Lives Saved"
- Production Number: 507

Title	Event date	Event location	Description	External links
"Christmas Ornament Fire"	December 20, 1992	Dover-Foxcroft, Maine	A burning Christmas tree traps a family in their basement.	
"Toothbrush Trauma"	January 12, 1993	Germantown, Maryland	A boy gets a toothbrush impaled in his throat after falling with it sticking out of his mouth.	
"11-Year-Old Road Save"	July 1, 1993	Sacramento, California	A girl stops the car when her mother passes out behind the wheel.	Approximate location where car was stopped (intersection of Shorthorn Road and Tavernor Road) on Google Street View
"Jolly Rancher Heimlich"	February 22, 1993	Arcola, Mississippi	A boy does the Heimlich maneuver when his classmate chokes on a piece of candy.	Location of Deer Creek School on Google Street View

==== Episode 5.10 (November 30, 1993) ====
- Production Number: 511

Title	Event date	Event location	Description	External links
"Mother's Day Flood"	May 9, 1993	Gainesville, Texas	A Chevrolet Suburban towing an RV ends up in flooding stranding two women inside. Firemen must use a ladder truck to rescue them.	
"Endometriosis Mom"	February 7, 1992	South Bend, Indiana	A woman goes into endometriosis.	
"Canteen Tongue"	June 16, 1993	Union, Maine	A boy gets his tongue stuck in a canteen at his school's Field Day.	Location of Union Elementary School on Google Street View Behind the scenes newspaper article: Page 1, Page 2
"Louisville Docu-Jared"	August 13, 1993	Louisville, Kentucky	A boy falls from a roof.	

==== Episode 5.11 (December 14, 1993) ====
- Production Number: 504

Title	Event date	Event location	Description	External links
"Snomos Thru Ice"	December 19, 1992	Minnetrista, Minnesota	A snowmobile falls through ice.	
"Acadian Air Docu"	May 30, 1993	Baton Rouge, Louisiana	A speedboat accident and a toddler burned by hot grease.	Approximate location of speedboat accident on Google Street View
"911 Business Suit Intruder"	December 22, 1992	Lexington, North Carolina	A burglar in a suit breaks into a house with two girls who are home alone.	
"Firefighter Heart Attack" (II)	July 26, 1991	Kilgore, Texas	After a firefighter gets sick after putting out a fire at a supermarket, he suffers a heart attack.	Location of Leon Dodgen Physical Plant Center at Kilgore College—on the site of Super Saver Mart (where fire occurred)

==== Episode 5.12 (December 21, 1993) ====
- Production Number: 512

Title	Event date	Event location	Description	External links
"Wrong Number Rescue"	December 31, 1992; January 1, 1993	Dingmans Ferry, Pennsylvania	A young girl trying to reach a friend calls a wrong number and reaches a man who is suffering a heart attack.	
"Dr.'s Hay Crush"	July 15, 1992	Wichita, Kansas	A doctor gets paralyzed when a bale of hay falls on him while working on his farm.	
"Christmas Tree Inferno"	December 19, 1991	Wichita, Kansas	When a Christmas tree catches a house on fire, a teenage girl tries to save her little brother when he hides from the fire.	
"Chimney Trapped Crook"	January 4, 1993	Oceanside, California	An intruder gets stuck upside down in a chimney.	

==== Episode 5.13 (January 4, 1994) ====
- Production Number: 513

Title	Event date	Event location	Description	External links
"Uncertified Scuba Diver"	May 29, 1993	Seattle, Washington	A diver runs out of air while underwater.	
"Louisville Docu II" *	August 13, 1993	Louisville, Kentucky	A man who was stabbed and a father and child injured in a motorcycle crash are transported to Norton Children's Hospital by air ambulance.	Location of Norton Children's Hospital on Google Street View
"911 5-Year-Old Home Alone"	January 15, 1993	Owosso, Michigan	A 5-year-old girl comes home from school to find that her parents aren't home and calls 911.	Newspaper article about the segment
"Double Family Rescue"	June 12, 1992	Shelbyville, Tennessee	An ambulance transporting a toddler with a heart problem to the hospital discovers a car crash and the victim is the toddler's grandfather.	

==== Episode 5.14 (January 11, 1994) ====
- Production Number: 514

Title	Event date	Event location	Description	External links
"Waverunner Down"	August 13, 1992	Snake River, Lewiston, Idaho	Two wave runners crash into each other.	Location of Snake River on Google Street View Newspaper article about the segment Article from The Lewiston Tribune (August 14, 1992) about incident Article from The Lewiston Tribune (September 18, 1993) about incident and re-enactment
"Paragliding Peril"	June 29, 1993	Torrey Pines, San Diego, California	A German paraglider inexperienced in American cliff paragliding crashes into a cliff, leaving him stranded and holding on.	Approximate location of incident at Black's Beach on Google Street View
"Cop's Son Shooting"	June 23, 1991	Edgewood, Maryland	When a young boy finds his police officer father's service pistol, his older brother attempts to confiscate it from him. In the struggle, the younger boy is accidentally shot.	Article from The Baltimore Sun (June 25, 1991) about incident Article from The Baltimore Sun (January 10, 1994) about incident
"Baby on Board"	September 6, 1993	Conway, Arkansas	A cop pulls over a speeding car and discovers that the driver is a pregnant woman in labor.	

==== Episode 5.15 (January 18, 1994) ====
- Production Number: 515

Title	Event date	Event location	Description	External links
"San Diego Boat Blast"	June 21, 1991	San Diego, California	A boat explodes and catches fire, leaving a woman injured and her family in danger.	Approximate location of incident on Google Street View
"911 Suicide Son Save"	March 11, 1993	Helendale, California	Following an argument with his father over cutting school, a teen tries to commit suicide by shooting himself.	
"Police Dog Down"	February 25, 1992	Hamilton, Ontario	A man fatally shoots a police dog during a standoff.	
"Mystery Dispatch"	September 11, 1990	Mathews, Virginia	When a dispatcher chokes on a piece of candy, she uses the emergency tones to signal that she is in danger.	Location of Mathews Volunteer Rescue Squad on Google Street View

==== Episode 5.16 (January 25, 1994) ====
- Kid Heroes
- This compilation episode replayed some of the show's stories about kid heroes from past seasons.

Title	Event date	Event location	Description	External links
"911 Rifle"	August 1, 1989	Indianapolis, Indiana	A boy accidentally shoots his friend's sister with a rifle (from Episode 1.9).	
"Best Buddy Rescue"	February 24, 1991	Ruston, Louisiana	An 11-year-old boy saves his best friend who accidentally hung himself on a rope swing (from Episode 3.4).	
"Sister Saves Siblings"	December 11, 1990	Blowing Rock, North Carolina	Young siblings are caught in a house fire while home alone and the oldest child helps them all evacuate (from Episode 3.3).	
"Brain Hemorrhage"	July 14, 1990	New Brunswick, New Jersey	A 5-year-old boy calls 911 when his mother is losing consciousness (from Episode 2.21).	

==== Episode 5.17 (February 1, 1994) ====
- Production Number: 516

Title	Event date	Event location	Description	External links
"Send in the Clowns"	April 21, 1993	Portland, Maine	A clown suffers a heart attack during a circus.	
"Boy Scout Treehouse Save"	August 28, 1993	Jackson, Mississippi	A 13-year-old boy falls out of a tree while building a treehouse, and his friends save his life with their Boy Scout training.	
"Boxcar Boy"	September 17–20, 1993	Indianapolis, Indiana (start of event); Lafayette, Indiana (found)	A boy falls inside a hopper car while playing with friends. The train subsequently leaves, and one friend hides the info on where he is from the victim's family and police. The police and the Norfolk and Western Railway undertake a massive search for him. Three days later a toddler finds him calling for help in the stopped train while playing in his grandmother's backyard 60 miles away.	Article from The Journal Times (September 21, 1993) about incident Article from The Buffalo News (September 21, 1993) about incident
"A Work of Art"	October 31, 1990	Odessa, Texas	A baby girl chokes on an apple and a Southwestern Bell employee who is working outside performs CPR on her when her mother runs out into the street to get help. The segment is aptly named as the man who helped save her was named Art.	

==== Episode 5.18 (February 8, 1994) ====
- Production Number: 517

Title	Event date	Event location	Description	External links
"Convertible Crash"	June 28, 1991	Valdosta, Georgia	A woman's car gets caught underneath a moving tractor trailer.	Approximate location of crash on I-75 South on Google Street View
"Idaho Trauma Docu"	September 3, 1993	Shelley, Idaho, Idaho Falls, Idaho	Footage of a girl being treated after being hit by a car on her bicycle by a helicopter crew and at Eastern Idaho Regional Medical Center.	Location of Eastern Idaho Regional Medical Center on Google Street View
"Special Olympian Hero"	August 7, 1993	Ivoryton, Connecticut	A cop goes into an allergic reaction after being stung by yellow jackets, and his brother (with Down syndrome) gets help.	
"Grandma's Breech Baby"	August 3, 1993	Springfield, Tennessee	A young woman gives birth at home.	

==== Episode 5.19 (March 8, 1994) ====
- Production Number: 518
- This episode was the normal 60 minutes, unlike other episodes with two segments. The second segment took up the last 45 minutes of the episode, with two commercial breaks.

Title	Event date	Event location	Description	External links
"Track and Field Save"	October 29, 1992	Nyack, New York	A 13-year-old boy goes into cardiac arrest during gym class.	Location of Nyack Middle School on Google Street View
	July 5, 1993	Las Vegas, Nevada	A Norwegian family makes the decision to donate their daughter's organs after she is killed in a crash while on vacation (docu segment).	

==== Episode 5.20 (March 10, 1994) ====
- Humorous Rescues
- This compilation episode replayed some of the show's humorous rescue stories from past seasons. The segments may not have been presented in the order listed.

Title	Event date	Event location	Description	External links
"Freezer Tongue"	August 16, 1991	Altoona, Pennsylvania	A boy gets his tongue stuck in the freezer (from Episode 3.11).	
"Rocky Raccoon"	November 17, 1990	Shreveport, Louisiana	A raccoon gets its head stuck in a tree (from Episode 2.27).	
"911 Rusty Burglar"	July 11, 1991	Los Angeles, California	A burglar is unable to get out of a restaurant after he breaks in through the ceiling (from Episode 3.9).	
"911 Dad's Baby"	September 3, 1989	Huntington Beach, California	A man must deliver his wife's baby with the help of a 911 operator (from Episode 1.12).	
"Laundry Chute Lad"	May 3, 1992	Columbia, South Carolina	A boy playing hide and seek gets stuck in a laundry chute (from Episode 4.3).	

==== Episode 5.21 (March 15, 1994) ====
- Production Number: 519

Title	Event date	Event location	Description	External links
"Mud Trap Rescue"	April 5, 1992	Mobile, Alabama	Two teenage girls are in a car crash, leaving one pinned under the car in a muddy ditch.	Approximate location of crash on Google Street View
"Surfboard Save"	March 4, 1990	Lake Jewel, Putnam County, Florida	A teen injures his spinal cord from diving into a shallow part of a lake.	
"Barracuda Barrage"	July 9, 1993	Islamorada, Florida	A woman gets a barracuda bite while her husband is fishing.	AP News article (July 11, 1993) about incident South Florida Sun-Sentinel article (July 12, 1993) about incident Tampa Bay Times article (July 12, 1993) about incident UPI article (July 12, 1993) about incident
"Pool Neighbor Save"	August 16, 1993	Burlington, Vermont	A child drowns in a backyard pool.	

==== Episode 5.22 (March 22, 1994) ====
- Production Number: 520

Title	Event date	Event location	Description	External links
"Potpourri Fire Save"	December 13, 1992	Rogers, Arkansas	A man is trapped in a burning house.	
"911 Pea Heimlich"	August 23, 1993	Calgary, Alberta	When a boy chokes on peas from the garden in his backyard, a teenage girl who is babysitting him calls 911 and has to follow instructions on how to perform the Heimlich Maneuver from a dispatcher on the other end of the line.	
"Rollerblade Rescue"	July 20, 1992	Corona, California	A boy on rollerblades is hit by a water truck on the day before his birthday.	
"Butane Huffing"	April 11, 1992	Tulsa, Oklahoma	A 15-year-old boy collapses and eventually dies after inhaling butane.	

==== Episode 5.23 (March 29, 1994) ====
- Animal Rescues Edition
- Production Number: 521

Title	Event date	Event location	Description	External links
"Police Shepherd Stabbed"	March 8, 1993	Modesto, California	A police dog is stabbed by a man causing a domestic disturbance.	Newspaper article on the segment
"Piggy Peril"	October 14, 1993	The Dalles, Oregon	A woman's pet pig is trapped in a burning house but is later saved by a heroic policeman.	
	July 30, 1993	Davis, California	U.C. Davis animal medical center documentary.	
"Stinky's Sewer Save"	July 27, 1993	Corpus Christi, Texas	A dog is trapped in a storm drain.	Approximate location of sewer drain where puppy was trapped (intersection of North Alameda Street and Caldwell Street) on Google Street View

==== Episode 5.24 (April 5, 1994) ====
- Production Number: 522
- The segment title "ATV Flip" was obtained from Pluto TV's on-demand watchlist for Rescue 911 and may be incomplete, as Pluto TV truncated many of the titles in its listings.

Title	Event date	Event location	Description	External links
"Brother Pool Shock"	May 30, 1993	Pembroke Pines, Florida	A father risks his life trying to save his two teenage sons when they are electrocuted by a lamp post near their apartment complex's swimming pool.	AP News article (June 1, 1993) about incident Article from South Florida Sun-Sentinel (June 1, 1993) about incident Article from South Florida Sun-Sentinel (September 6, 1993) about incident
"Fallen Firefighter"	August 30, 1993	Tulsa, Oklahoma	A firefighter falls through the attic floor of a burning house.	
"Harley Hogs the Ball"	September 7, 1993	Presque Isle, Maine	A dog accidentally swallows a ball it is playing with.	
"ATV Flip" *	August 16, 1989	Harrisburg, Pennsylvania	An ATV accident leaves a boy with a head injury.	

==== Episode 5.25 (May 3, 1994) ====
- Production Number: 523

Title	Event date	Event location	Description	External links
"African Crocodile Attack"	May 1, 1986	Zimbabwe	A crocodile attacks a father, his son, and a tour guide while swimming in an African river and the father loses his arm.	
"Austin Cop Collision"	April 2, 1993	Austin, Texas	A rookie cop crashes during a high-speed chase.	
"911 Out on a Limb"	October 16, 1993	Millville, Pennsylvania	A boy and his mother are stuck in a tree.	
"Hockey Havoc"	March 14, 1992	Plattsburgh, New York	An ice hockey player is seriously injured after a vicious open-ice body check.	Satellite view of Ronald B. Stafford Ice Arena Map of SUNY Plattsburgh campus AP News article (March 21, 1992) about incident

==== Episode 5.26 (May 10, 1994) ====
- Child Safety Edition
- Production Number: 524

Title	Event date	Event location	Description	External links
"911 Son in the Spa"	September 9, 1993	Laguna Niguel, California	A baby boy drowns in a hot tub.	
"Speed Dial Burn Save"	June 17, 1993	Hingham, Massachusetts	A girl is burned when her mother accidentally spills hot grease on her face.	
"Kapiolani Children's Hospital Docu"	February 1994	Waianae, Hawaii (location of ATV crash); Honolulu, Hawaii (location of hospital)	Documentary at Kapi'olani Medical Center for Women & Children featuring treatment of a young boy who accidentally flipped his uncle's ATV.	Location of Kapi'olani Medical Center for Women & Children on Google Street View
"Garage Door Daughter"	March 15, 1991	Tarzana, California	A girl gets stuck in a garage door while a real estate agent is surveying her house.	Article from The Los Angeles Times (March 18, 1991) about incident

==== Episode 5.27 (May 17, 1994) ====
- Production Number: 525

Title	Event date	Event location	Description	External links
"Snowboarder Save"	January 11, 1992	Peru, Vermont	A man loses control while snowboarding and flies over a mountain side.	Location of Bromley Mountain Ski Resort on Google Street View
"911 Glass Cut Teen"	December 28, 1993	Dana Point, California	A girl suffering the flu stumbles into a wall and severely cuts her neck and chest on a drinking glass.	
"Plaster of Peril"	April 16, 1992	Lincoln, Nebraska	A college art student gets a plaster mask stuck on his face and needs his ex-girlfriend's father, who is an orthodontist, to get it off.	Union College on Google Street View
"Pick-up Thrown Teen"	August 18, 1993	Ontario, California	A girl is thrown from the bed of a pickup truck when it collides with another car.	

==== Episode 5.28 (May 24, 1994) ====
- Production Number: 526

Title	Event date	Event location	Description	External links
"Snowmobile Sister Plunge"	March 6, 1993	Rome, New York	A teenage girl riding a snowmobile with her sister falls into a creek and gets trapped underneath it.	Approximate location of incident on Google Street View
"911 Don't Answer the Door"	March 21, 1992	Scarborough, Maine	A burglar breaks into a cabin home and the homeowner attacks the burglar with a hammer.	
"Scissors Save"	August 13, 1992	Cincinnati, Ohio	A boy accidentally stabs himself while running with a pair of scissors.	
"Heat Stroke Hiker"	July 7, 1990	Las Vegas, Nevada	A teenage girl passes out from the heat while hiking in a desert with her boyfriend.	Approximate location of incident at Red Rock Canyon National Conservation Area on Google Street View

=== Season 6 (1994–95) ===
- Season 6 consists of 29 episodes (25 original episodes including a Christmas themed episode, 3 episodes containing a mix of new and repeat segments, and 1 episode containing all repeat segments).

==== Episode 6.1 (September 13, 1994) ====
- Production Number: 955

Title	Event date	Event location	Description	External links
"Windsurfer"	March 8, 1993	Columbia, South Carolina	A windsurfer is in the right place at the right time when a couple's boat capsizes.	Approximate location of incident at Monticello Reservoir on Google Street View
"Carbon Monoxide Family"	November 4, 1992	Colorado Springs, Colorado	Repeated from Episode 5.4	
"Where's My Wife"	June 23, 1992	Napoleon, Indiana	Repeated from Episode 5.4	
"Quechee Gorge Rescue"	June 29, 1992	White River Junction, Vermont	Repeated from Episode 5.4	

==== Episode 6.2 (September 20, 1994) ====
- Production Number: 601

Title	Event date	Event location	Description	External links
"Hang Glider Hovercraft Rescue"	June 25, 1993	British Columbia	A hang glider tied to a boat crashes.	
"Bradley's Heimlich Save"	July 12, 1993	Pensacola, Florida	A 21-year-old boy with Down syndrome performs the Heimlich maneuver on his choking father.	
"911 Runaway Car"	August 29, 1993	North Carolina	A woman's car gets stuck at high speed and won't stop.	Approximate location on Interstate 95 South where car chase ended on Google Street View
"911 Pregnant Tumbler"	November 30, 1993	Lusby, Maryland	A pregnant woman falls down a flight of steps while doing laundry and her son calls 911.	

==== Episode 6.3 (September 27, 1994) ====
- Production Number: 602

Title	Event date	Event location	Description	External links
"Cliffhanger Rescue"	March 21, 1994	Goreville, Illinois	A teen falls while jumping across a narrow canyon. Two of the rescuers are convicts being trained to become EMTs.	Approximate location of incident at Ferne Clyffe State Park on Google Street View
"911 Wrong Way Delivery"	January 8, 1994	San Antonio, Texas	A pregnant woman goes into labor at home.	
"New Zealand Shark Attack"	April 24, 1992	Campbell Island, New Zealand	A man loses an arm in a shark attack while scuba diving.	Satellite view of Campbell Island/Motu Ihupuku
"Choking Chihuahua"	February 10, 1994	Buda, Texas	A dog chokes on a marble.	

==== Episode 6.4 (October 4, 1994) ====
- Production Number: 603

Title	Event date	Event location	Description	External links
"Car Surfing Girl"	September 17, 1992	La Marque, Texas	A girl riding on the hood of her sister's car falls off and gets her leg stuck in the engine.	Crash location on Google Street View
"Cardiac Controller"	May 5, 1993	Seattle, Washington	An air traffic controller has a heart attack while on duty, and his colleagues must prevent a crash on the runway while trying to save his life.	Location of Seattle-Tacoma International Airport on Google Street View
"Circling Boat Rescue"	May 28, 1994	Grove, Oklahoma	A man's fishing boat hits another boat's wake, and he and his wife are thrown overboard, leaving his young stepson trapped on board and the boat out of control, but a teenage boy on a wave runner comes to the rescue.	Satellite view of Honey Creek Cove (where incident occurred)
"Sewer Pug Save"	March 13, 1994	Houston, Texas	A dog falls into a storm drain.	

==== Episode 6.5 (October 11, 1994) ====
- Production Number: 604

Title	Event date	Event location	Description	External links
"Slush Puppy"	December 29, 1993	Missoula, Montana	A dog falls through the ice and gets trapped in the freezing river.	
"911 Trunk Lock"	July 7, 1993	Gray, Louisiana	Two girls get locked in the trunk of a car and succumb to heat exhaustion.	
"Train Track Hero"	March 22, 1994	Boca Raton, Florida	A rear-end collision leaves an elderly woman unconscious in her car on railroad tracks as a train approaches, but another motorist saves her just in time.	Crash location on Google Street View
"911 Christina's Call"	February 23, 1992	Rock Hill, South Carolina	A girl calls 911 when her abusive stepfather stabs her mother after an argument.	

==== Episode 6.6 (October 18, 1994) ====
- Production Number: 605

Title	Event date	Event location	Description	External links
"Killington Plane Crash"	January 19, 1991	Killington, Vermont	A plane crashes in a freezing remote mountain area when its wings ice up.	Location of Killington Peak on Google Street View
"Teen Night Asthma"	November 12, 1993	Milford, Ohio	A teenage girl has a severe asthma attack, and her mother doesn't know this until emergency crews arrive.	
"Go-Kart Mishap"	November 6, 1993	Wichita Falls, Texas	A young boy gets injured after he and his friend crash a go-kart they are riding in at an amusement park, but at first, no one notices anything is wrong.	
"Greco-Roman Rescue"	December 2, 1993	Wilkes-Barre, Pennsylvania	A teenage wrestler is injured during a match.	Location of Arnaud C. Marts Center at Wilkes University on Google Street View

==== Episode 6.7 (October 25, 1994) ====
- Production Number: 606

Title	Event date	Event location	Description	External links
”6-Year-Old Castaway”	April 10, 1994	Texas City, Texas	Two boys float out to sea in an inflatable raft and one of them falls out.	Beach location on Google Street View
	May 2, 1993	Concord, Massachusetts	A boy chokes on corn.	
”Mountain Biking Blowout”	February 13, 1994	Blackwell, Texas	A man is thrown from his mountain bike.	
	December 5, 1992	Maple Heights, Ohio	A teenage girl has an apparent asthma attack while marching in a parade, but has actually overdosed on her medication as a suicide attempt sparked by her parents' divorce.	

==== Episode 6.8 (November 1, 1994) ====
- Production Number: 607

Title	Event date	Event location	Description	External links
"Indian Runner Rescue"	February 1992	Mexico	A dentist's wife is thrown from a mule and falls down a cliff while they are on a healthcare mission in Mexico, and an Indian man runs several miles to get help.	
"Erlanger Medical Center Documentary"	October 2, 1993	Chattanooga, Tennessee	Erlanger Medical Center documentary.	Location of Erlanger Baroness Hospital Emergency Room on Google Street View
"Underage Teen Driver"	August 6, 1993	Chillicothe, Missouri	Underage girls are in a car crash, leaving one with a bloodied face and the other pinned under the overturned vehicle.	
"Dog Leash Struggle"	April 15, 1994	Dutton, Virginia	A dog leash strangles a girl and a good Samaritan tries to help her.	

==== Episode 6.9 (November 8, 1994) ====
- Production Number: 608

Title	Event date	Event location	Description	External links
"Twin Car Trauma"	February 25, 1994	Riverdale, Georgia	A toddler accidentally runs over his twin brother with his father's car after he accidentally puts it into gear while washing it.	
"Fast Break Heart Ache"	June 26, 1993	Spokane, Washington	A young man goes into cardiac arrest while playing basketball during Hoopfest.	HoopFest location on Google Street View
"Bridal Veil Falls Rescue"	May 31, 1993	Provo, Utah	A young man falls from a cliff at Bridal Veil Falls in Provo Canyon while hiking with his girlfriend's family.	Waterfall location on Google Street View Behind-the-scenes newspaper article
"Paramedic Daddy Delivery"	September 6, 1993	Crosby, Texas	A woman gives birth in her husband's ambulance.	

==== Episode 6.10 (November 15, 1994) ====
- Women Heroes Edition
- Production Number: 609

Title	Event date	Event location	Description	External links
"Pontoon Boat Save"	July 15, 1993	Bull Shoals, Arkansas	A boy's life jacket catches onto a pontoon boat's propeller.	Article from the Chicago Tribune (November 15, 1994) about incident and re-enactment
"Fire Sister Save"	June 11, 1994	Brooklyn, New York	A woman gets trapped inside her burning home and her sister is a responding paramedic	
"Victorville Bank Bust"	January 24, 1992	Victorville, California	A dangerous high-speed chase following a bank robbery	Location of robbery (First Interstate Bank, now Wells Fargo Bank) on Google Street View
"Mom Sleeping Like a Pig"	March 28, 1994	Denton, Texas	A 3-year-old girl calls 911 when her mother suffers an allergic reaction to antibiotics.	

==== Episode 6.11 (November 22, 1994) ====
- Production Number: 610

Title	Event date	Event location	Description	External links
"Footfault Avalanche"	February 15, 1993	Deerfield, New York	Two kids are trapped in an avalanche, and one manages to escape but cannot find his friend.	Article from The Buffalo News (February 16, 1993) about incident
"Slick Cat Save"	April 1994	Bowie, Maryland	A cat is stuck in a ventilation system.	
"Pickup Truck Heroes"	August 8, 1994	Hammond, Indiana	Two kids are hit by a pickup truck when it crashes through a convenience store, and one of them is pinned under the truck.	Location of crash (Grand Food Mart, at intersection of 169th Street and Calumet Avenue) on Google Street View Article from The Times of Northwest Indiana (September 24, 1994) about incident and re-enactment Article from The Times of Northwest Indiana (November 21, 1994) about incident and re-enactment
"911 Silent Intruder"	July 11, 1994	Lafayette, California	A woman mistakes a mannequin in her house for an intruder.	

==== Episode 6.12 (December 13, 1994) ====
- Production Number: 611

Title	Event date	Event location	Description	External links
"Bullet Wound Neighbor"	May 12, 1994	Ackworth, Iowa	When a farmer is firing a gun to scare away a dog trying to kill his chickens and ducks, he accidentally shoots his neighbor's daughter in the shed.	
"Austin Documentary"	May 1994	Austin, Texas	Domestic violence documentary.	
"Morro Bay Submerged Car"	May 20, 1993	Morro Bay, California	A woman is trapped inside her car when it falls into a canal.	Approximate location of crash on Google Street View
"911 Bath Trapped Mommy"	August 25, 1992	Arlington, Texas	A woman is trapped in her bathroom when the lock on the door malfunctions.	

==== Episode 6.13 (December 20, 1994) ====
- Christmas Edition
- Production Number: 612

Title	Event date	Event location	Description	External links
"BVI Dinghy Disaster"	December 25, 1991	Sandy Cay, British Virgin Islands	A family is thrown from a boat by a wave.	Location of Sandy Cay on Google Street View
"Truck Trapped Mechanic"	December 28, 1992	Eatonville, Washington	A pickup truck loses its support and falls on a mechanic.	
"Aussie Santa Save"	December 25, 1993	Gold Coast, Queensland, Australia	A boy is thrown from his jet ski, and is saved by an off-duty paramedic dressed as Santa Claus.	Approximate location of rescue at Nobby Beach on Google Street View
"Christmas Bulb Choke"	December 9, 1993	Atlantic Beach, North Carolina	A baby boy chokes on a Christmas ornament's bulb top.	

==== Episode 6.14 (January 3, 1995) ====
- Production Number: 613

Title	Event date	Event location	Description	External links
"Repentant Drunk Driver"	January 28, 1992	West Lafayette, Ohio	A drunk driver kills a man and seriously injures a woman. Following the crash, he corresponds with her while incarcerated and speaks to others about his experience.	Approximate location of crash on Google Street View
"Jackson Memorial Documentary"	May 16, 1994	Miami, Florida	A group of children injured in a car crash are treated at Jackson Memorial Hospital (Docu segment).	Location of Jackson Memorial Hospital Emergency Room on Google Street View
"911 Honeybee Horror"	August 23, 1994	Robstown, Texas	A tractor runs over a beehive, unleashing a swarm of angry bees at the driver.	
"Carbon Monoxide Cop"	November 11, 1993	Prairie Village, Kansas	A cop and his family are poisoned by carbon monoxide.	

==== Episode 6.15 (January 10, 1995) ====
- Production Number: 614

Title	Event date	Event location	Description	External links
"Deck Trapped Kid"	March 7, 1992	Salyer, California	A boy tries to chop off supports to a deck and it falls on top of him. One of the responding firefighters is his father.	
"Ft. Lauderdale Docu"	January 31, 1994	Fort Lauderdale, Florida	A man who is hit while riding his motorcycle is treated at Broward General Medical Center.	Location of Broward Health Medical Center on Google Street View
"Horse Crushed Helmet"	August 21, 1993	Granby, Colorado	A horse falls on a boy's head after throwing him off, crushing his skull.	
"Alcohol Overdose"	May 26, 1994	Ocean Springs, Mississippi	Two teenagers get alcohol poisoning after excessive drinking.	Approximate location of Inner Harbor Park on Google Street View

==== Episode 6.16 (January 17, 1995) ====
- Production Number: 615

Title	Event date	Event location	Description	External links
"Glass Crash Rescue"	June 28, 1994	Silver Spring, Maryland	When a group of workmen tries to remove a damaged window from a strip mall, it shatters in their hands and one of them is severely cut.	
"911 Ham Heimlich"	June 1994	Cayuga, North Dakota	A baby chokes on ham.	
"NY Animal Hospital Doc II"	September 2, 1994	New York, New York	Various animals being treated.	
"Sand Embankment Avalanche"	September 25, 1993	St. Leo, Kansas	A boy is buried by a sand avalanche.	

==== Episode 6.17 (January 24, 1995) ====
- Production Number: 956

Title	Event date	Event location	Description	External links
"Brush Fire Rescue"	March 14, 1994	Blue Mound, Texas	A firefighter is run over while fighting a brush fire	Location of Blue Mound Fire Department Station 32 on Google Street View Approximate location of brush fire on Google Street View
"911 Out on a Limb"	October 16, 1993	Millville, Pennsylvania	Repeated from Episode 5.25.	
"Hockey Havoc"	March 14, 1992	Plattsburgh, New York	Repeated from Episode 5.25	
"African Crocodile Attack"	May 1, 1986	Zimbabwe	Repeated from Episode 5.25	

==== Episode 6.18 (January 31, 1995) ====
- Production Number: 616

Title	Event date	Event location	Description	External links
"911 Don't Talk Now"	April 7, 1992	North Andover, Massachusetts	A burglary occurs while a woman is house sitting for her parents.	
"Chance Encounter"	February 28, 1994	Palm Springs, California	Officers searching for truant boys find seriously injured female hikers instead.	Location of Tahquitz Peak on Google Street View
"Locomotive Cop Hero"	September 8, 1994	Waxhaw, North Carolina	A toddler boy and his mother get trapped inside their car after it stalls on a railroad crossing as a train approaches, and a cop risks his life to save them.	Railroad location on Google Street View; Photo of CSX 2408, the locomotive used in the re-enactment, as it currently works in Quebec
	April 23, 1994	Memphis, Tennessee	A teenage girl suffers an allergic reaction to shrimp while at the prom.	

==== Episode 6.19 (February 7, 1995) ====
- Children Heroes Edition
- Production Number: 617

Title	Event date	Event location	Description	External links
"Grandma Fire Save"	July 22, 1993	Joliet, Illinois	An elderly Hispanic woman is trapped in her burning house, and her grandchildren save her by recalling fire safety techniques from the state fair.	
"Bathtub Seizure"	October 28, 1994	Oakland, California	A boy finds his mom having a seizure in a bathtub.	
"Stop Drop 'n Roll Treehouse" (aka "Stop, Drop, and Roll 3")	November 22, 1993	Oceanside, California	A boy's shirt catches fire from a candle while sitting in a treehouse.	
"911 Brittany's Brave Call"	January 22, 1994	Palmdale, California	A young girl dials 911 when her father goes into insulin shock.	

==== Episode 6.20 (February 14, 1995) ====
- Production Number: 618

Title	Event date	Event location	Description	External links
"Delta Heart Save"	January 26, 1994	Philadelphia, Pennsylvania	An elderly woman goes into cardiac arrest while on an airplane with her son.	
"Look Both Ways"	August 10, 1994	Biglerville, Pennsylvania	A girl gets hit by a car while crossing a street with a dog.	
"Drainage Trap"	July 12, 1994	Eunice, Louisiana	A boy is sucked into a drainage pipe while playing in a drainage ditch after a storm.	
"Rear End Baby"	July 22, 1994	Foothill Ranch, California	A woman suffers pregnancy complications.	

==== Episode 6.21 (February 21, 1995) ====
- Production Number: 619

Title	Event date	Event location	Description	External links
"911 Accidental Shooting"	September 8, 1994	Lubbock, Texas	A boy playing with a shotgun accidentally shoots his younger brother.	
	October 20, 1994	Mesa, Arizona	A boy is rushed by his parents to the local fire station following an asthma attack.	
"911 Closet Intruder"	January 1, 1993	San Jose, California	A single mother and her son hide in the closet and call 911 when a burglar breaks into their apartment and is looking for them.	
"911 Mommy's Bleeding"	November 16, 1994	Denver, Colorado	A girl calls 911 when her mother has a uterine infection.	

==== Episode 6.22 (February 22, 1995) ====
- Production Number: 957H
- 30-minute episode

Title	Event date	Event location	Description	External links
"Baby on Board"	September 6, 1993	Conway, Arkansas	A speeding driver turns out to be pregnant. Repeated from Episode 5.14	
"Harley Hogs the Ball"	September 7, 1993	Presque Isle, Maine	A dog chokes on a ball (Repeated from Episode 5.24)	

==== Episode 6.23 (February 28, 1995) ====
- Production Number: 620

Title	Event date	Event location	Description	External links
"Alaskan Whale Save"	October 2, 1994	Barnes Lake, Alaska	A group of people use noise to move a group of whales to a safer location	Aerial view of Barnes Lake; Report on rescue
"Hornet Attack Save"	July 1994	Swain County, North Carolina	A hornet stings a man causing him to have an allergic reaction while on vacation	Location of Nantahala Inn (where incident occurred) on Google Street View Location of Fontana Village Resort & Marina (where incident was re-enacted) on Google Street View
"Riding Mower Mayhem"	April 19, 1993	Thompson's Station, Tennessee	A teenage girl accidentally runs over her brother with a riding lawn mower	
"Mule Pull Cardiac"	1992	Rutland, Vermont	A man suffers a heart attack while riding a mule at the Vermont State Fair	Location of Vermont State Fair on Google Street View

==== Episode 6.24 (March 21, 1995) ====
- Production Number: 621

Title	Event date	Event location	Description	External links
	July 23, 1993	Flower Mound, Texas	A child crawls into a backyard pool	
"911 Sibling Delivery"	September 23, 1994	Blue Springs, Missouri	Three children are home with their mother when she goes into labor	
"911 Officer Down" (aka "999 Officer Down")	October 10, 1994	Phoenix, Arizona	A cop is shot while investigating suspicious people	
	October 22, 1994	Jonesboro, Arkansas	A 12-year-old Girl Scout does CPR on a collapsed jogger	Approximate location of start of Arkansas State University 5K Fun Run on Google Street View

==== Episode 6.25 (May 2, 1995) ====
- Miracle Rescues Edition
- Production Number: 622

Title	Event date	Event location	Description	External links
"Jeep Bubble Save"	July 25, 1994	Live Oak County, Texas	A boy survives in an air pocket underwater for over 20 minutes when he accidentally drives his parents' Jeep into a pond	
"Phoenix Aerovac Again"	July 4, 1994	Mesa, Arizona	An elderly man recovers from a long coma after falling through a skylight	
"8th Floor Miracle Baby"	August 7, 1993	Destin, Florida	A toddler is uninjured after falling 70 feet off the balcony of a seventh floor condo onto the pavement below	Location of Breakers East Condominiums on Google Street View
"Snow Plow Buried Boy"	December 1994	Grand Falls-Windsor, Newfoundland	A boy is buried in a mound of snow formed by a snow plow	

==== Episode 6.26 (May 9, 1995) ====
- Child Safety Edition

Production Number: 623

Title	Event date	Event location	Description	External links
"Window Fall Rescue"	June 4, 1994	Mechanicsville, Maryland	A boy falls out of his bedroom window	
"Metro Dade Fire/Rescue Doc"	January 31, 1995	Miami, Florida	A boy hit by a car and a toddler hit by a falling television are treated at Jackson Memorial Hospital	Location of Jackson Memorial Hospital Emergency Room on Google Street View
"Depacote Disaster"	November 15, 1994	Nashville, Tennessee	A girl swallows her sister's anticonvulsant medication	
Slide Strangle	January 8, 1993	Schoolcraft, Michigan	A teacher saves his student when the string on his jacket gets stuck on a playground slide	Location of Schoolcraft Elementary School on Google Street View
"Baby Bathtub Burn"	February 18, 1992	Clio, Michigan	A boy is scalded by hot water from a bathtub	

==== Episode 6.27 (May 16, 1995) ====
- Production Number: 624

Title	Event date	Event location	Description	External links
"Son Snowboarding Save"	February 23, 1994	Crystal Mountain, Washington	A snowboarder runs off a trail and gets buried by snow drifts	Approximate location of incident at Crystal Mountain Resort on Google Street View
"Zookeeper Down"	December 29, 1994	Scottsbluff, Nebraska	When a leopard attacks a zookeeper while she is trying to clean its cage, coworkers must risk their lives to get her out	Location of Riverside Discovery Center zoo on Google Street View
"Happy Ending Hang-Glider" *	November 24, 1989	Waimanalo, Hawaii	A hang glider crashes into a guard rail. The nurse in charge of his care befriends him, and they marry.	Approximate location of crash on Google Street View
"Healing the Healers" *	April 19, 1995	Oklahoma City, Oklahoma	Group counseling sessions with rescuers who were on the scene of the Oklahoma City Bombing	

==== Episode 6.28 (May 17, 1995) ====
- Production Number: 958H
- 30-minute episode

Title	Event date	Event location	Description	External links
	December 23, 1994	Greentown, Ohio	Two kids fall into a frozen pond	
"Bella's Little Buddy"	July 6, 1992	Colorado River	Repeated from Episode 5.3	

==== Episode 6.29 (May 23, 1995) ====
- Production Number: 625

Title	Event date	Event location	Description	External links
"Chattahoochee Baby Rescue"	November 26, 1994	Lumpkin County, Georgia	A toddler gets lost while hiking with her family in the Chattahoochee National Forest. The United States National Guard, police, and a special computer map are used to help search for and find her.	
"911 Hamburger Hold-Up"	June 28, 1993	Mesa, Arizona	A restaurant manager is shot in the neck during a robbery	Location of Carl's Jr. fast food restaurant where robbery occurred on Google Street View
"Oregon Dad Saves Daughter"	March 21, 1994	Oakridge, Oregon	A woman's car skids off a cliff as her father watches from the car in front	Approximate location of Gombert's Motel (from start of segment) on Google Street View Approximate location of crash on Willamette Highway on Google Street View
"Airborn"	November 23, 1994	Washington, D.C.	A baby is born prematurely on an airplane	Location of John F. Kennedy International Airport (where plane took off) on Google Street View Location of Dulles International Airport (where plane made emergency landing) on Google Street View Article from South Florida Sun Sentinel (November 27, 1994) about birth AP News article (November 27, 1994) about birth Google News article (November 27, 1994) about birth

=== Season 7 (1995–96) ===
- This season consisted of 15 episodes (14 original episodes and 1 episode containing a mix of new and repeat segments).

==== Episode 7.1 (September 12, 1995) ====
- Production Number: 701
  - Note: The Writers Guild of America lists the production number as 631

Title	Event date	Event location	Description	External links
	March 28, 1995	Albany, New York; Rochester, New York	An airplane loses its lights and communication during flight	Albany airport on Google Street View
	December 9, 1994	Upper Marlboro, Maryland	Four teens are injured when a car is t-boned by a school bus	
	December 9, 1994	Fresno, California	Two gunmen attempt to rob a drugstore	Robbery location on Google Street View (no longer a drugstore)
	September 25, 1989	San Jose, California	A pregnant woman gets a plaster cast stuck on her chest	

==== Episode 7.2 (February 1, 1996) ====
- Production Number: 628

Title	Event date	Event location	Description	External links
"911 Python Babysitter"	March 27, 1995	Milwaukee, Wisconsin	A woman is nearly strangled by her sister's pet Burmese python	
"CPR Parking Lot"	June 23, 1994	Wheaton, Illinois	A man is found lying in cardiac arrest in a parking garage	Location of DuPage County Government Center parking garage on Google Street View
"Hostage Hot Pursuit"	November 3, 1993	Parkersburg, West Virginia	A teenage fast food employee is kidnapped by an armed robber, leading police on a high-speed chase	Rax Roast Beef location involved in the robbery on Google Street View
"911 Car Phone Kid"	February 28, 1995	Deltona, Florida	A boy calls 911 on a car phone when his mother parks the car and passes out	Eckerd location where incident occurred on Google Street View

==== Episode 7.3 (February 8, 1996) ====
- Production Number: 629

Title	Event date	Event location	Description	External links
	April 26, 1994	Port Angeles, Washington	A teenager falls more than 200 feet off a cliff	
	July 28, 1991	Muncie, Indiana	A scuba diver loses her regulator while underwater	
"Turnpike Samaritan Save" *	March 2, 1994	Stroud, Oklahoma	A car is crushed by cargo breaking loose from a truck, incapacitating the driver	Approximate location of Turner Turnpike accident on Google Street View
	February 10, 1995	Beverly Hills, California	A pet green iguana falls and drowns in a swimming pool	

==== Episode 7.4 (February 15, 1996) ====
- Production Number: 707

Title	Event date	Event location	Description	External links
"Trooper Buddy Down" *	1993	Powhatan, Virginia	A head-on crash involving a state trooper and his pregnant wife	Approximate location of crash on Google Street View
	February 27, 1995	Deerfield, New Hampshire	A man gives his wife rescue breathing when she has an asthma attack	
"Swiftwater Rescue" *	June 14, 1995	Longmont, Colorado	A car with two women inside crashes into a river	Approximate location of crash on Google Street View
	June 23, 1995	Boynton Beach, Florida	Three children climb high into a tree	

==== Episode 7.5 (February 22, 1996) ====
- Production Number: 709

Title	Event date	Event location	Description	External links
	June 24, 1995	San Francisco, California	Police search frantically for a woman scheduled to receive a kidney transplant whose location is unknown	Location of Fisherman's Wharf on Google Street View Location of UCLA Medical Center on Google Street View
"Squid Ship Son Save" *	June 20, 1995	New Jersey	A Freon leak causes a boy to pass out and drown in the refrigerator of his dad's fishing boat	Article from National Fisherman (June 1997) about incident
	July 30, 1992	Phoenix, Arizona	Two cops are shot when they stop to confront a suspicious man with a gun	
	May 6, 1995	Clayton, North Carolina	A girl gets her tongue stuck in the mouth of a glass bottle	

==== Episode 7.6 (February 29, 1996) ====
- Production Number: 708

Title	Event date	Event location	Description	External links
	March 28, 1995	Tampa, Florida	A blind woman and her service dog are injured in a car crash.	Location of crash on Google Street View
	March 19, 1994	Destin, Florida	A scuba diver runs out of oxygen	Location of U.S. Coast Guard Station Destin on Google Street View
	September 27, 1994	Fremont, California	A man standing on a high bridge threatens to commit suicide	Location of bridge on Google Street View
	May 27, 1995	Boston, Massachusetts	Veterinary clinic documentary at Angell Memorial Hospital	Location of Angell Animal Medical Center on Google Street View

==== Episode 7.7 (March 7, 1996) ====
- Production Number: 630

Title	Event date	Event location	Description	External links
"Brother Glass Save" *	May 2, 1994	Saint Paul, Minnesota	A boy breaks through a window and severely cuts his arm while jumping on a bed	
"Dishwasher Electrocution" *	August 15, 1994	Evanston, Wyoming	A man is electrocuted while trying to repair his dishwasher	
"Santa Barbara Whale Save" *	November 1, 1993	Santa Barbara, California	Attempts to tow a beached humpback whale back out to sea	Approximate location of beached humpback whale at El Capitan State Beach on Google Street View
"Shorthanded at Shorty's" *	March 8, 1995	Richmond, Virginia	A convenience store's manager gets his hand stuck in a safe. A locksmith offers his services to get it out.	Location of incident (Shorty's Convenience Store, now Pump Mart Exxon) on Google Street View

==== Episode 7.8 (March 28, 1996) ====
- Production Number: 626

Title	Event date	Event location	Description	External links
	January 13, 1994	Goshen, Indiana	A warehouse worker is pinned by steel beams that fall from a forklift	Location of incident (Supreme Corporation) on Google Street View
	July 10, 1994	Phoenix, Arizona	A man has heatstroke while dirt biking in the desert with his stepson	
	February 26, 1994	Issaquah, Washington	A girl falls off a waterfall	Location of Highpoint Trailhead on Google Street View Google Maps view of area
	June 19, 1993	Trotwood, Ohio	A dog alerts its owners that their baby has stopped breathing	

==== Episode 7.9 (April 4, 1996) ====
- Production Number: 712

Title	Event date	Event location	Description	External links
	April 25, 1995	Lexington, Kentucky	An electric guitar gives a band member an electric shock during a rehearsal	
	November 1, 1993	Redding, California	A girl calls 911 when her father stabs her mother in a case of domestic violence.	
	July 9, 1995	Marathon County, Wisconsin	A woman falls out of a covered wagon when the horses bolt, causing her leg to be crushed under the wheel	Approximate location of incident on Google Street View
	October 16, 1994	Ellenton, Florida; Saint Petersburg, Florida	A married couple are injured when they are ejected from their vehicle on Interstate 75. This documentary segment shows their treatment via air ambulance at the scene and recovery in the hospital.	

==== Episode 7.10 (April 11, 1996) ====
- Production Number: 710

Title	Event date	Event location	Description	External links
	March 5, 1994	Salt Lake City, Utah	Salt Lake City Public Library hostage incident	Location of The Leonardo (formerly the main branch of Salt Lake City Public Library) on Google Street View
	April 11, 1995	Cope, South Carolina	A woman goes into premature labor in a car	Article from The Times and Democrat (June 3, 2013; updated February 18, 2020) about incident and re-enactment
	June 21, 1991	Snæfellsjökull, Iceland	A snowmobile falls into a glacier fissure	Location of Snæfellsjökull glacier on Google Street View
"Lizard Finger Lock" *	April 25, 1995	Quarryville, Pennsylvania	A pet lizard bites down on a toddler's finger and won't let go	

==== Episode 7.11 (April 23, 1996) ====
- Production Number: 913H
- 30-minute episode

Title	Event date	Event location	Description	External links
	January 20, 1995	Tucson, Arizona	A Police dog is shot after a high-speed chase	
"Tree Trapped Boy"	June 2, 1995	Franklinton, Louisiana	A fallen tree buries a child under its roots	

==== Episode 7.12 (May 2, 1996) ====
- Production Number: 627

Title	Event date	Event location	Description	External links
"Parking Lot Hero"	March 2, 1994	Saginaw, Michigan	A baby goes into respiratory arrest in a crowded parking deck	Location of parking deck where incident occurred on Google Street View
	January 21, 1995	Irvine, Kentucky	A toddler puts a car in gear, causing it to roll into the street	Location of Kentucky River Bridge (approximate location where car was stopped) on Google Street View
	July 9, 1993	Surrey, British Columbia	A 13-year-old girl is home alone when a break in occurs	
	November 15, 1994	Akron, Ohio	Documentary follows premature baby's stay at the neo-natal intensive care unit at Children's Hospital	Location of Akron Children's Hospital Neonatal Intensive Care Unit on Google Street View

==== Episode 7.13 (August 6, 1996) ====
- Production Number: 711

Title	Event date	Event location	Description	External links
"Dunebuggy Disaster"	June 4, 1995	Stanford, Kentucky	A teenage dirt biker discovers a couple injured in a dunebuggy crash	
"Pool Filter Kid"	June 27, 1995	Sacramento, California	A boy is stuck in a backyard pool filter	
"Paraglider Gondola Save"	June 6, 1994	Aspen, Colorado	A paraglider's parachute catches on a gondola line	Location of Aspen Mountain Ski Resort on Google Street View
"Baby John Doe"	Spring 1994	Highland Township, Michigan	An abandoned baby is found in a park after dark	Approximate location where baby was found on Google Street View

==== Episode 7.14 (August 20, 1996) ====
- Production Number: 713

Title	Event date	Event location	Description	External links
	July 3, 1995	Granada, Colorado	An overturned tractor pins a teenage boy underwater in a muddy ditch	Approximate location of crash on Colorado 196 on Google Street View
"Curious Courtney" *	September 8, 1995	Bangor, Maine	A student gets her finger stuck in a desk	Location of Fourteenth Street School on Google Street View
	January 20, 1995	Tucson, Arizona	A Police dog is shot after a high-speed chase (repeat from Episode 7.11)	
	June 2, 1995	Franklinton, Louisiana	A fallen tree buries a child under its roots (repeat from Episode 7.11)	

==== Episode 7.15 (August 27, 1996) ====
- Production Number: 714

Title	Event date	Event location	Description	External links
	October 3, 1995	St. Louis, Missouri	A boy saves other kids on a school bus when the driver suffers a stroke behind the wheel	Approximate location where school bus was stopped on Google Street View Location of Bellerive Elementary School on Google Street View Article from Greensboro News & Record (October 4, 1995) about incident Article from UPI Archives (October 4, 1995) about incident Article from The Spokesman-Review (October 5, 1995) about incident Article from The Spokesman-Review (October 13, 1995) about incident
	July 6, 1995	Las Vegas, Nevada	Four children injured in a car crash are treated at University Medical Center (docu segment)	Location of crash (intersection of E. Owens Ave. and N. Eastern Ave./Civic Center Dr.) on Google Street View Location of University Medical Center of Southern Nevada on Google Street View
	October 26, 1991	North Little Rock, Arkansas	A kneeboarder crashes into trees along the banks of a lake	
"Toddler Truck Fall"	April 15, 1995	Loves Park, Illinois	A child opens the door of a moving pickup truck in a Walmart parking lot and lands on the pavement on his head. He died before the episode was released.	Approximate location of crash on Google Street View
	January 18, 1994	Detroit, Michigan	An elderly man discovers a boy frozen in the snow on the side of the road	

=== Syndicated Episodes ===
In 1993, a re-formatted version of Rescue 911 began airing in syndication. In this format, each episode ran 30 minutes and contained two stories (or sometimes one long-running story) taken from episodes that originally aired in the hour format on CBS.

The syndicated version of the series consisted of three "seasons" (hereafter referred to as "sets") of 100 episodes that initially aired in first-run syndication from 1993 to 1996. The syndicated version subsequently aired on several national networks including The Hallmark Channel (formerly Odyssey), Discovery Health Channel, Justice Network, and GetTV.

The syndicated episodes are generally shown in production order when the series airs on national networks. When the show aired in first-run syndication, local affiliates across the U.S. aired the same block of five episodes within a given week, typically showing one episode per day Monday through Friday; the original air dates listed follow this convention. However, some stations deviated from this schedule (e.g., WCCB in Charlotte, NC aired two episodes Monday, two episodes Tuesday, and one episode Saturday for most of the first set). Although episodes aired somewhat out of production order in first-run syndication, especially in Set 1, blocks of five episodes aired in production order within a given week. The Justice Network air dates are included to establish the production order, as Justice has aired the most syndicated episodes to date (285 out of 300) of any U.S. network since the show aired in first-run syndication.

==== Set 1 ====
The first set of syndicated episodes originally aired from 1993 to 1994 and consisted of segments from Seasons 1–3 (including Episode 4.8, which was postponed from Season 3). The television listings did not provide episode descriptions for the weeks of August 23, August 30, and November 1, 1993, so the original air dates for 15 of the episodes in Set 1 may be earlier than the date given.

Episode Number	Title	Original Air Date	Justice Network Air Date	Original Episodes
101S	"Wing Walker; 5-Year-Old Saves Mom"	September 6, 1993	October 30, 2017	3.9 & 3.13
102S	"Sinking Sisters; Subway Save"	September 7, 1993	October 30, 2017	3.1 & 3.1
103S	"River-Tubing Rescue; Mailman Save"	September 8, 1993	October 30, 2017	2.19 & 2.23
104S	"Pacoima Cliff Safe; American River"	September 9, 1993	October 30, 2017	2.7 & 1.3
105S	"911-Dialing Dog; Loma Linda Docu"	September 10, 1993	unaired	2.12 & 2.2
106S	"Heart-Attack Crash; Brother Hostage"	September 13, 1993	October 31, 2017	3.20 & 3.11
107S	"911 Suicide Gun Save; Yellow Jacket Attack"	September 14, 1993	October 31, 2017	2.17 & 2.5
108S	"Firefighter Heart Attack; Mattress Mayhem"	September 15, 1993	October 31, 2017	2.12 & 2.4
109S	"Log-Pinned Baby; Best-Buddy Rescue"	September 16, 1993	October 31, 2017	3.4 & 3.4
110S	"Back-Seat Baby; Truck vs. Train"	September 17, 1993	November 1, 2017	3.10 & 3.26
111S	"911 Spider Bite; Runaway Truck"	September 20, 1993	November 1, 2017	2.6 & 2.20
112S	"Teen Gun Explosion; French Parasailing"	September 21, 1993	November 1, 2017	3.7 & 3.26
113S	"911 Under the Bed; Landing Gear"	September 22, 1993	November 1, 2017	1.11 & 1.3
114S	"911 Gun Shop; Gas Leak Baby"	September 23, 1993	November 2, 2017	2.2 & 2.20
115S	"Sis Burn Car Save; Children's Docu"	September 24, 1993	November 2, 2017	2.4 & 2.18
116S	"Phoenix Flood; 911 Baby Sitter Prowler"	October 4, 1993	November 2, 2017	2.10 & 2.5
117S	"Carriage Mishap; Stop Drop II"	October 5, 1993	November 2, 2017	3.5 & 3.14
118S	"Texas Pool Tot; 911 Bank Rob Recovery"	October 6, 1993	November 3, 2017	2.29 & 2.6
119S	"Walkie Talkie Rescue; N.Y. Double Roof Rescue (Part 1)"	October 7, 1993	November 3, 2017	2.18 & 3.10
120S	"N.Y. Double Roof Rescue (Part 2); Rocky Raccoon"	October 8, 1993	November 3, 2017	3.10 & 2.27
121S	"Box-Canyon Rescue; Garage-Door Kid"	September 27, 1993	November 3, 2017	3.19 & 3.5
122S	"Chocolate-Chip Rescue; 911: He's Not an Officer"	September 28, 1993	November 6, 2017	3.16 & 3.21
123S	"Fire-Ant Trauma; Spiderman Rescue"	September 29, 1993	November 6, 2017	3.25 & 3.25
124S	"University Pipe Bomb; 911 My Baby Drowned"	September 30, 1993	November 6, 2017	3.24 & 3.23
125S	"911 Child Asthma; Houston Trauma Docu"	October 1, 1993	November 6, 2017	2.11 & Special 1/2.11
126S	"Daytona; Hotdog Heimlich"	October 11, 1993	November 7, 2017	2.8 & 2.7
127S	"Motel Toddler Plunge; Bike Boy"	October 12, 1993	November 7, 2017	2.20 & 2.25
128S	"White Eagle Impalement; Ando the Dog"	October 13, 1993	November 7, 2017	3.21 & 3.17
129S	"911 Stalker Save; 911 Firecracker Explosion"	October 14, 1993	November 7, 2017	3.5 & 4.8
130S	"CHP Burning Car; Austin Docu"	October 15, 1993	November 8, 2017	2.29 & 2.24
131S	"Regatta Rescue; 911 New York Fire"	October 18, 1993	November 8, 2017	3.11 & 3.2
132S	"Felon Follow; Cannon-Ball Kid"	October 19, 1993	November 8, 2017	3.22 & 3.16
133S	"911 Bathtub Baby; Lightning Lads"	October 20, 1993	November 8, 2017	2.25 & 2.4
134S	"Go-Kart Girl; Freeway the Fawn"	October 21, 1993	November 9, 2017	3.17 & 3.5
135S	"911 Fatal Attraction; Philly Docu"	October 22, 1993	November 9, 2017	2.3 & 2.5
136S	"Balloon Save; 911 Rusty Burglar"	August 2, 1993	November 9, 2017	3.2 & 3.9
137S	"Fernie's Heart; Daughter in a Tree"	August 3, 1993	November 9, 2017	3.19 & 3.21
138S	"Denver Chopper"	August 4, 1993	November 10, 2017	2.29
139S	"Florida Keys Scuba; 911 Diabetic Dad"	August 5, 1993	November 10, 2017	2.18 & 2.14
140S	"Collapsed School Bus; St. Pete Docu"	August 6, 1993	November 10, 2017	3.7 & 3.23
141S	"New Zealand Tanker; Gator Gulch"	August 9, 1993	November 10, 2017	3.26 & 3.8
142S	"Remarriage Rescue; Cop Saves Dog"	August 10, 1993	November 13, 2017	2.26 & 2.13
143S	"Cincinnati Neonatal Docu; 6-Year-Old Hero"	August 11, 1993	November 13, 2017	3.6 & 3.17
144S	"Burning Jeep Pin; 911 Gotta Get to School"	August 12, 1993	November 13, 2017	3.22 & 3.16
145S	"911 Date Rape; 911 Freezer Tongue"	August 13, 1993	November 13, 2017	3.19 & 3.11
146S	"Ice-Dive Rescue; Newark Docu"	August 16, 1993	November 14, 2017	3.15 & 3.15
147S	"Heart Attack Teacher; 911 Smart Boy"	August 17, 1993	November 14, 2017	2.5 & 2.8
148S	"Double Hero Down"	August 18, 1993	November 14, 2017	2.28
149S	"Houdini Save; Dispatcher Down"	August 19, 1993	November 14, 2017	2.3 & 2.16
150S	"Brain Hemorrhage; Bear Rescue"	August 20, 1993	November 15, 2017	2.21 & 2.3
151S	"Niagara River Rescue; Smoke-Filled House"	February 28, 1994	November 15, 2017	2.17 & 1.8
152S	"911 Yellow Cab; Runaway Dogsled"	March 1, 1994	November 15, 2017	3.7 & 4.8
153S	"Tornado Trap; L.A. Superman"	March 2, 1994	November 15, 2017	2.9 & 2.24
154S	"Three Parachutes; 911 Snake Baby"	March 3, 1994	November 16, 2017	3.8 & 3.15
155S	"Boston"	March 4, 1994	unaired	1.20
156S	"Downhill Savior; 911 Placenta Previa (Part 1)"	December 6, 1993	unaired	3.3 & 3.3
157S	"911 Placenta Previa (Part 2); Electrocuted Teen"	December 7, 1993	November 16, 2017	3.3 & 3.20
158S	"Blacked-Out Driver; 911 Self Inflicted Wound"	December 8, 1993	November 16, 2017	3.13 & 3.27
159S	"Tampa Docu; Pond Boy"	December 9, 1993	November 16, 2017	2.4 & 2.6
160S	"Trailer Fire; 911 Swordfish Save"	December 10, 1993	November 17, 2017	2.6 & 2.28
161S	"Sand-Tunnel Boy; 911 Arm Save"	October 25, 1993	November 17, 2017	2.14 & 2.13
162S	"Peeping Prowler; Sister Save"	October 26, 1993	November 17, 2017	2.1 & 2.1
163S	"Elvis Docu(kid); Potomac River"	October 27, 1993	November 17, 2017	2.15 & 2.11
164S	"Cobra Chaos; 911 Choking Granny"	October 28, 1993	November 20, 2017	2.23 & 2.15
165S	"Dangling Skier; 911 Alligator Alley"	October 29, 1993	November 20, 2017	2.3 & 2.9
166S	"911 Video Stabbing; Sinking Snowmobile"	November 29, 1993	November 20, 2017	3.6 & 3.26
167S	"13-Year-Old Heimlich; Civil War"	November 30, 1993	November 20, 2017	3.27 & 3.2
168S	"Runaway Car; Snowgirl Save"	December 1, 1993	November 21, 2017	3.8 & 3.12
169S	"EMT Husband Save; Freon Freak"	December 2, 1993	unaired	3.18 & 3.18
170S	"Scuba Save"	December 3, 1993	November 21, 2017	2.2
171S	"911 Rifle; De-Fib Phone"	February 14, 1994	November 21, 2017	1.9 & 1.16
172S	"Pesky Python; Woman Car Rescue"	February 15, 1994	November 21, 2017	1.22 & 1.18
173S	"Mountain Glacier; Gas Thief"	February 16, 1994	November 22, 2017	3.27 & 3.13
174S	"Lake Boy; Elvis Docu II"	February 17, 1994	November 22, 2017	3.6 & 3.20
175S	"Arlington; Santa Save"	February 18, 1994	November 22, 2017	Special 1/1.16 & 2.12
176S	"Funny Car; Supermarket Hero"	February 21, 1994	November 22, 2017	1.10 & 1.19
177S	"911 Sibling Stabbing; Runaway Garbage Truck"	February 22, 1994	November 23, 2017	1.30 & 1.17
178S	"Wolf Baby; 911 Smoke-Filled Apartment"	February 23, 1994	November 23, 2017	2.28 & 2.19
179S	"Car Kidnap Baby; Sobering Save"	February 24, 1994	November 23, 2017	2.24 & 2.25
180S	"5-Year-Old Dad Save; Las Vegas Docu"	February 25, 1994	November 23, 2017	2.24 & 2.13
181S	"Player Down; 911 Dad's Baby"	March 21, 1994	November 24, 2017	1.3 & 1.12
182S	"Iron Jockey; Tucson Victim Docu"	March 22, 1994	November 24, 2017	3.21 & 3.23
183S	"Kidnapped Kids; Parachute"	March 23, 1994	November 24, 2017	1.19 & 1.1
184S	"Suicide Save; Highway Hero"	March 24, 1994	November 24, 2017	1.27 & Special 2/1.6
185S	"Icy River; Sudden Death"	March 25, 1994	November 27, 2017	Special 2/1.8 & Special 2/1.9
186S	"Resurrection Rescue; 911 3-Year-Old"	November 8, 1993	November 27, 2017	1.19 & 1.21
187S	"Cave Save"	November 9, 1993	November 27, 2017	2.23
188S	"Teen Angel; Parrot Save"	November 10, 1993	November 27, 2017	2.22 & 1.26
189S	"Heart Attack Car Save; Runaway Boxcars"	November 11, 1993	November 28, 2017	1.20 & 1.19
190S	"911 Hidden Phone; Swamp Save"	November 12, 1993	November 28, 2017	1.25 & 1.5
191S	"911 Chatty Burglar; Heimlich Brothers"	November 15, 1993	November 28, 2017	1.28 & 1.13
192S	"Oakland Docu; Running Senior Save"	November 16, 1993	November 28, 2017	3.10 & 3.11
193S	"911 Asthma; Double Football Player"	November 17, 1993	November 29, 2017	1.22 & 1.9
194S	"Miracle Marine; School-Bus Save"	November 18, 1993	November 29, 2017	1.20 & 1.30
195S	"Snowmobile Save; Storm-Drain Girl"	November 19, 1993	November 29, 2017	2.13 & 1.4
196S	"Saint Save; Denver General Knife"	November 22, 1993	unaired	1.23 & 1.23
197S	"Arroyo Boy; Whale Save"	November 23, 1993	unaired	1.1 & 1.28
198S	"Terror in the Sky"	November 24, 1993	November 29, 2017	2.27
199S	"Loggers' Baby; Church Bus"	November 25, 1993	November 30, 2017	2.12 & Special 1/1.17
200S	"Feed-Bin Boy; Rescuers Rescue"	November 26, 1993	November 30, 2017	1.8 & 1.28

==== Set 2 ====
The second set of syndicated episodes originally aired from 1994 to 1995 and consisted of segments from Seasons 1–4, and the first four episodes (in production order) of Season 5. The Justice Network showed all 100 episodes from Set 2, making it the only set to be shown in its entirety since airing in first-run syndication.

Episode Number	Title	Original Air Date	Justice Network Air Date	Original Episodes
201S	"Maui Sand Trap; Pool Electrocution"	September 5, 1994	November 30, 2017	4.18 & 1.2
202S	"Ex-RN Son Save; Sparkletts the Dalmatian"	September 6, 1994	November 30, 2017	3.23 & 4.9
203S	"Blind Hero; Babysitter Down"	September 7, 1994	December 1, 2017	1.17 & 4.2
204S	"Phoenix Flood II; 911 Toddler Glass Save"	September 8, 1994	December 1, 2017	4.4 & 4.4
205S	"Maryland Med; Laundry-Chute Lad"	September 9, 1994	December 1, 2017	1.18 & 4.3
206S	"RN Rough River; Bar Blast (Part 1)"	September 12, 1994	December 1, 2017	3.14 & 2.19
207S	"Bar Blast (Part 2); DUI Teen Driver"	September 13, 1994	December 4, 2017	2.19 & 4.21
208S	"Balcony Fall; 911 Bank Capture"	September 14, 1994	December 4, 2017	4.17 & 4.18
209S	"Amtrak; Dog Rescue"	September 15, 1994	December 4, 2017	1.16 & Special 2/1.13
210S	"Hugo II"	September 16, 1994	December 4, 2017	1.27
211S	"Drainage Ditch; CO-Poison Family"	September 19, 1994	December 5, 2017	4.2 & 4.10
212S	"Hypo Hang Glider; 911 Arsonist"	September 20, 1994	December 5, 2017	2.21 & Special 2/1.18
213S	"911 Cribbage Choke; Patrol Car Fire Save"	September 21, 1994	December 5, 2017	4.14 & 4.26
214S	"Sporting Goods Heist; Sister Saves Siblings"	September 22, 1994	December 5, 2017	4.16 & 3.3
215S	"Las Vegas Docu II; Bootless Hero"	September 23, 1994	December 6, 2017	4.6 & 3.14
216S	"Plowed Under; CPR Baby"	September 26, 1994	December 6, 2017	3.12 & 1.2
217S	"Horseback Havoc; Winter Pool Baby"	September 27, 1994	December 6, 2017	2.16 & 1.25
218S	"911 Conference Call; Hanging Hang Glider"	September 28, 1994	December 6, 2017	1.13 & 4.17
219S	"ATV Big Brother; 911 Kenny's Bathtub"	September 29, 1994	December 7, 2017	4.11 & 4.11
220S	"911 Lansing Stabbing; 911 Santa Delivery"	September 30, 1994	December 7, 2017	1.4 & 4.10
221S	"Dive Buddy Rescue; Jungleland"	October 3, 1994	December 7, 2017	4.25 & 4.9
222S	"Chemistry Hero; Fireman Down"	October 4, 1994	December 7, 2017	1.16 & 3.17
223S	"Stevie Saves Dad; Hunting Horror"	October 5, 1994	December 8, 2017	4.1 & 1.21
224S	"Double Electrocution; Christmas Tree Fall (Part 1)"	October 6, 1994	December 8, 2017	1.11 & 4.13
225S	"Christmas Tree Fall (Part 2); 6th Grade CPR"	October 7, 1994	December 8, 2017	4.13 & 4.24
226S	"911 Whitney's Bus Crash; Stop, Drop, and Roll"	October 10, 1994	December 8, 2017	4.28 & 1.26
227S	"Security Bar Save; BB Gun Blast"	October 11, 1994	December 11, 2017	4.7 & 4.7
228S	"Maryland Med (Chad); Peeved Preschooler"	October 12, 1994	December 11, 2017	3.15 & 1.2
229S	"Furnace Fire; Logger's Lament"	October 13, 1994	December 11, 2017	1.5 & 1.24
230S	"Supermarket Hostage; Grapevine Fall"	October 14, 1994	December 11, 2017	1.1 & 4.16
231S	"Lake Mead Ultralight; Senior Sharpshooter"	October 17, 1994	December 12, 2017	4.9 & 1.21
232S	"Twin Drowning; Oklahoma Cops Documentary"	October 18, 1994	December 12, 2017	4.23 & 4.14
233S	"911 Unwanted Intruder; Stranded Octos"	October 19, 1994	December 12, 2017	4.6 & 1.10
234S	"Dynamite; Rocking Chair"	October 20, 1994	December 12, 2017	1.15 & 1.15
235S	"St. Jays River; D.C. Children's Documentary"	October 21, 1994	December 13, 2017	1.4 & 4.28
236S	"911 Sister Abduction; Toppled Trans AM"	October 24, 1994	December 13, 2017	4.21 & 4.12
237S	"Miami Medchopper; River Raft"	October 25, 1994	December 13, 2017	1.27 & 1.4
238S	"Hurt Highway Lt.; Garage Door Fire Pin"	October 26, 1994	December 13, 2017	2.14 & 4.4
239S	"911 Heart O Glass; Seattle Cop Down (Part 1)"	October 27, 1994	December 14, 2017	3.22 & 1.14
240S	"Seattle Cop Down (Part 2); Digitalis Kid O.D."	October 28, 1994	December 14, 2017	1.14 & 2.8
241S	"Ski Heart Puncture; 911 Insulin Shock Dad"	October 31, 1994	December 14, 2017	4.14 & 4.21
242S	"New Orleans Docu Shoot; 911 Jagged Edge Rescue"	November 1, 1994	December 14, 2017	4.26 & 1.24
243S	"911 Accidental Gunshot; Water-Monitor Mayhem"	November 2, 1994	December 15, 2017	4.23 & 4.23
244S	"Baby Fire Rescue; Sealant Overdose"	November 3, 1994	December 15, 2017	Special 1/1.14 & 4.9
245S	"911 Break-in Boy; Animal Docu"	November 4, 1994	December 15, 2017	1.6 & 2.17
246S	"Aussie Snakebite; 911 Blizzard Baby"	November 7, 1994	December 15, 2017	4.27 & 4.27
247S	"Mother Shooting; Conrail Train"	November 8, 1994	December 18, 2017	4.13 & 1.2
248S	"Easter Hunt; Mount Whitney"	November 9, 1994	December 18, 2017	1.5 & 1.25
249S	"No Helmet Horror; Riding Mower Rescue"	November 10, 1994	December 18, 2017	4.28 & 4.27
250S	"911 Trunk-Trapped Tot; Nail-Gun Heart"	November 11, 1994	December 18, 2017	4.22 & 4.22
251S	"The Helicopter Horse; 911 Kids in Smoke"	November 14, 1994	December 19, 2017	4.13 & 4.3
252S	"911 Break-In; Brakeless Bus"	November 15, 1994	December 19, 2017	2.26 & 4.10
253S	"Avalanche Friend; Marble Save"	November 16, 1994	December 19, 2017	4.5 & 1.28
254S	"Sister Stop, Drop, Roll; 911 I've Been Shot"	November 17, 1994	December 19, 2017	4.6 & 4.17
255S	"Boomer's Rescue; 911 It's a Boy"	November 18, 1994	December 20, 2017	3.27 & 4.25
256S	"Deaf Save; Venezuela Cave Save (Part 1)"	November 21, 1994	December 20, 2017	1.24 & 4.19
257S	"Venezuela Cave Save (Part 2); Swiss Army Knife"	November 22, 1994	December 20, 2017	4.19 & 4.15
258S	"Aussie Whale Save; 911 Sucker Save"	November 23, 1994	December 20, 2017	4.3 & 4.18
259S	"Escalator Traps Boy; Point Dume Drop"	November 24, 1994	December 21, 2017	4.25 & 4.2
260S	"Puerto Rico"	November 25, 1994	December 21, 2017	1.13
261S	"French Sky Diver; 911 Woodshop Trauma"	November 28, 1994	December 21, 2017	4.19 & 4.6
262S	"11-Year-Old CPR Save; 911 Ottawa Bank Bust"	November 29, 1994	December 21, 2017	4.6 & 4.24
263S	"Alpine Ski Crevasse; Falling Glass"	November 30, 1994	December 22, 2017	4.19 & 4.21
264S	"911 Stabbing/Shooting; Fancy Dancer"	January 12, 1995	December 22, 2017	4.22 & 2.15
265S	"L.A. Children's Hospital Docu; St. Louis Gas Leak"	January 13, 1995	December 22, 2017	4.1 & 4.5
266S	"Car Stripper; Hugo I (Part 1)"	January 16, 1995	December 22, 2017	2.9 & 1.18
267S	"Hugo I (Part 2); Snow Tubing Save"	January 17, 1995	December 25, 2017	1.18 & 4.12
268S	"Air Five; Roller Coaster Rescue"	January 18, 1995	December 25, 2017	1.3 & 4.3
269S	"Purgatory Chasm; 911 Birth"	January 19, 1995	December 25, 2017	4.8 & 1.1
270S	"Phoenix Aerovac; 2 Year Old Pool Save"	January 20, 1995	December 25, 2017	1.11 & 4.15
271S	"Racehorse Rescue; Softball Slugger Save"	January 23, 1995	December 26, 2017	4.22 & 4.20
272S	"911 Fast-Food Robbery; Heart Attack Hubby"	January 24, 1995	December 26, 2017	3.16 & 1.12
273S	"Pool Child; Atlanta Fire"	January 25, 1995	December 26, 2017	1.6 & 1.6
274S	"911 Smart Victim; Speed Boat Upside Down"	January 26, 1995	December 26, 2017	1.12 & 1.24
275S	"Swarm Save; A Defib Runs Through It"	January 27, 1995	December 27, 2017	5.1 & 4.26
276S	"Big Bear Plane Crash; Breakout Beagle"	January 30, 1995	December 27, 2017	4.23 & 5.1
277S	"Shaft Toddler; Police Quagmire"	January 31, 1995	December 27, 2017	1.5 & 1.8
278S	"Baby E.J.'s Burn; Lady's Not a Tramp"	February 1, 1995	December 27, 2017	2.27 & 4.17
279S	"Gas Leak Hero; Flooded Cave"	March 2, 1995	December 28, 2017	1.14 & 1.7
280S	"Washer Baby; Infrared"	March 3, 1995	December 28, 2017	2.14 & 1.10
281S	"Snomos Thru Ice; Russia Rescue (Part 1)"	February 27, 1995	December 28, 2017	5.11 & 3.9
282S	"Russia Rescue (Part 2); Potty Peril"	February 28, 1995	December 28, 2017	3.9 & 4.16
283S	"High Voltage Save; Black-Belt Hostage"	March 1, 1995	December 29, 2017	4.24 & 3.20
284S	"911 Lightning Husband; San Diego Child Docu"	February 2, 1995	December 29, 2017	5.2 & 5.3
285S	"New Daddy Crash; Bubba Saves Chewy"	February 3, 1995	December 29, 2017	5.3 & 4.14
286S	"Iceman Falleth; 911 Market Robbery"	February 6, 1995	December 29, 2017	4.26 & 4.15
287S	"Mickey's Heart Transplant; Teen Bullet"	February 7, 1995	January 1, 2018	4.27 & 4.1
288S	"NY Animal Docu; Good Samaritan Save"	February 8, 1995	January 1, 2018	4.18 & 4.1
289S	"Convenience Store Hero; Bella's Little Buddy"	February 9, 1995	January 1, 2018	5.1 & 5.3
290S	"Octallio Death Trap; Remorseful Burglar"	February 10, 1995	January 1, 2018	1.22 & 1.3
291S	"Train vs. Teens; Idaho Trooper Down (Part 1)"	February 13, 1995	January 2, 2018	5.2 & 4.5
292S	"Idaho Trooper Down (Part 2); Mountain Pool Plunge"	February 14, 1995	January 2, 2018	4.5 & 4.15
293S	"Heroic Trucker; 911 Cat Burglar"	February 15, 1995	January 2, 2018	4.4 & 5.2
294S	"911 Abruptio Placenta; Catalina Diver"	February 16, 1995	January 2, 2018	4.12 & 1.14
295S	"Siblings Save Gram; Bingo"	February 17, 1995	January 3, 2018	4.1 & 2.10
296S	"Comeback Kid; Bucket Drown Baby"	February 20, 1995	January 3, 2018	4.16 & 4.28
297S	"1033 Officer Down; SF Neonatal Docu"	February 21, 1995	January 3, 2018	4.25 & 1.7
298S	"Three Men and a Little Girl; Baltimore Cops"	February 22, 1995	January 3, 2018	4.10 & 1.6
299S	"911 Business Suit Intruder; Firefighter Heart Attack"	February 23, 1995	January 4, 2018	5.11 & 5.11
300S	"Hedge Trimmer Electrocution; Rock Climber"	February 24, 1995	January 4, 2018	4.20 & 2.23

==== Set 3 ====
The third set of syndicated episodes originally aired from 1995 to 1996 and consisted mainly of segments from Seasons 5 and 6, but a few segments from Seasons 1–4 were also included.

Episode Number	Title	Original Air Date	Justice Network Air Date	Original Episodes
301S	"Bumper Baby; Dallas Cop Down"	September 4, 1995	January 4, 2018	5.7 & 5.7
302S	"911 Peanut Heimlich; Piggy Peril"	September 5, 1995	January 4, 2018	5.6 & 5.23
303S	"Hayloft Hanging Hazard; Special Olympian Hero"	September 6, 1995	January 5, 2018	5.6 & 5.18
304S	"Carbon Monoxide Family; 911 Don't Answer the Door"	September 7, 1995	January 5, 2018	5.4 & 5.28
305S	"Idaho Trauma Docu; Chimney Trapped Crook"	September 8, 1995	January 5, 2018	5.18 & 5.12
306S	"Indian Runner Rescue; Waverunner Down (Part 1)"	September 11, 1995	January 5, 2018	6.8 & 5.14
307S	"Waverunner Down (Part 2); 911 Armed Robbery Recovery"	September 12, 1995	January 8, 2018	5.14 & 3.8
308S	"911 Glass Cut Teen; Psychic Cop"	September 13, 1995	January 8, 2018	5.27 & 2.11
309S	"Tool Box Tumble; Hurt Iowa Hiker"	September 14, 1995	January 8, 2018	5.8 & 2.21
310S	"Have Gun Will Discharge; Baby on Board"	September 15, 1995	January 8, 2018	5.5 & 5.14
311S	"Australian Balloon Save; Dr.'s Hay Crush (Part 1)"	September 18, 1995	January 9, 2018	5.5 & 5.12
312S	"Dr.'s Hay Crush (Part 2); 911 Pea Heimlich"	September 19, 1995	January 9, 2018	5.12 & 5.22
313S	"Teen Night Asthma; Acadian Air Docu"	September 20, 1995	January 9, 2018	6.6 & 5.11
314S	"Motel Hostage; Endometriosis Mom"	September 21, 1995	January 9, 2018	1.17 & 5.10
315S	"Train Track Hero; Stinky's Sewer Save"	September 22, 1995	January 10, 2018	6.5 & 5.23
316S	"Killington Plane Crash; Teen Car Crash (Part 1)"	September 25, 1995	January 10, 2018	6.6 & 2.10
317S	"Teen Car Crash (Part 2); Heat Stroke Hiker"	September 26, 1995	January 10, 2018	2.10 & 5.28
318S	"New Zealand Shark Attack; Bradley's Heimlich Save"	September 27, 1995	January 10, 2018	6.3 & 6.2
319S	"Send in the Clowns; Dirt Bike Boy"	September 28, 1995	January 11, 2018	5.17 & 1.10
320S	"911 Suicide Son Save; Choking Chihuahua"	September 29, 1995	January 11, 2018	5.15 & 6.3
321S	"Mud Trap Rescue; Prison EMT's (Part 1)"	October 2, 1995	January 11, 2018	5.21 & 1.30
322S	"Prison EMT's (Part 2); 911 Out on a Limb"	October 3, 1995	January 11, 2018	1.30 & 5.25
323S	"Mother's Day Flood; Rollerblade Rescue"	October 4, 1995	January 12, 2018	5.10 & 5.22
324S	"Circling Boat Rescue; Where's My Wife"	October 5, 1995	January 12, 2018	6.4 & 5.4
325S	"Pinellas EMS Docu; Jolly Rancher Heimlich"	October 6, 1995	January 12, 2018	5.5 & 5.9
326S	"BVI Dinghy Disaster; 911 Silent Intruder"	October 9, 1995	January 12, 2018	6.13 & 6.11
327S	"Children's Docu; 911 Wrong Way Delivery"	October 10, 1995	January 15, 2018	2.18 & 6.3
328S	"Underage Teen Driver; Cardiac Controller"	October 11, 1995	January 15, 2018	6.8 & 6.4
329S	"Fire Sister Save; Surfboard Save"	October 12, 1995	January 15, 2018	6.10 & 5.21
330S	"Morro Bay Submerged Car; Hockey Havoc"	October 13, 1995	January 15, 2018	6.12 & 5.25
331S	"African Crocodile Attack; 11-Year-Old Road Save"	October 16, 1995	January 16, 2018	5.25 & 5.9
332S	"911 Knoxville Intruder; Plaster of Peril"	October 17, 1995	January 16, 2018	5.8 & 5.27
333S	"Boy Scout Treehouse Save; Greco-Roman Rescue"	October 18, 1995	January 16, 2018	5.17 & 6.6
334S	"Trading Places; Mystery Dispatch"	October 19, 1995	January 16, 2018	2.7 & 5.15
335S	"San Diego Boat Blast; Motorcop Down"	October 20, 1995	January 17, 2018	5.15 & 5.6
336S	"Convertible Crash; Christmas Tree Inferno"	October 23, 1995	unaired	5.18 & 5.12
337S	"Police Shepherd Stabbed; Truck Trapped Mechanic"	October 24, 1995	January 17, 2018	5.23 & 6.13
338S	"Barracuda Barrage; ATV Flip" *	October 25, 1995	unaired	5.21 & 5.24
339S	"Slush Puppy; Kapiolani Children's Hospital Docu"	October 26, 1995	January 17, 2018	6.5 & 5.26
340S	"Snowboarder Save; 911 Nurse's Bathtub Baby"	October 27, 1995	January 17, 2018	5.27 & 5.1
341S	"Track and Field Save; Paragliding Peril"	October 30, 1995	January 18, 2018	5.19 & 5.14
342S	"Police Dog Down; Asphalt Trap"	October 31, 1995	January 18, 2018	5.15 & 5.4
343S	"Boxcar Boy; Dog Leash Struggle"	November 1, 1995	January 18, 2018	5.17 & 6.8
344S	"Cliffhanger Rescue; Scissors Save"	November 2, 1995	January 18, 2018	6.3 & 5.28
345S	"A Work of Art; Pittsburgh Transplant Doc"	November 3, 1995	January 19, 2018	5.17 & 4.24
346S	"Anniversary Rafting Horror; 911 Trunk Lock"	November 6, 1995	unaired	5.6 & 6.5
347S	"Footfault Avalanche; Harley Hogs the Ball"	November 7, 1995	January 19, 2018	6.11 & 5.24
348S	"Austin Documentary; Toothbrush Trauma"	November 8, 1995	January 19, 2018	6.12 & 5.9
349S	"Pontoon Boat Save; Canteen Tongue"	November 9, 1995	unaired	6.10 & 5.10
350S	"911 Christina's Call; Penny Choke"	November 10, 1995	January 19, 2018	6.5 & 5.2
351S	"Snowmobile Sister Plunge; Fast Break Heart Ache"	November 13, 1995	January 22, 2018	5.28 & 6.9
352S	"Brother Pool Shock; Grandma's Breech Baby"	November 14, 1995	January 22, 2018	5.24 & 5.18
353S	"Mom Sleeping Like a Pig; Cop's Son Shooting"	November 15, 1995	January 22, 2018	6.10 & 5.14
354S	"NY Animal Hospital Doc II; Carbon Monoxide Cop"	November 16, 1995	January 22, 2018	6.16 & 6.14
355S	"911 Brittany's Brave Call; Garage Door Daughter"	November 17, 1995	January 23, 2018	6.19 & 5.26
356S	"Car Surfing Girl; Wrong Number Rescue"	November 20, 1995	January 23, 2018	6.4 & 5.12
357S	"Applebee's Hostage Crisis; Locomotive Cop Hero"	November 21, 1995	January 23, 2018	5.3 & 6.18
358S	"Bridal Veil Falls Rescue; 911 Bath Trapped Mommy"	November 22, 1995	January 23, 2018	6.9 & 6.12
359S	"Pool Neighbor Save; ATV Barbed Wire"	November 23, 1995	January 24, 2018	5.21 & 2.26
360S	"Pickup Truck Heros; Butane Huffing"	November 24, 1995	January 24, 2018	6.11 & 5.22
361S	"Christmas Ornament Fire; San Francisco Docu"	November 27, 1995	January 24, 2018	5.9 & 3.13
362S	"Brush Fire Rescue; Mule Pull Cardiac"	November 28, 1995	January 24, 2018	6.17 & 6.23
363S	"Bullet Wound Neighbor; Go-Kart Mishap"	November 29, 1995	January 25, 2018	6.12 & 6.6
364S	"Depacote Disaster; Slick Cat Save"	January 11, 1996	January 25, 2018	6.26 & 6.11
365S	"Glass Crash Rescue; Louisville Docu-Jared"	January 12, 1996	unaired	6.16 & 5.10
366S	"Potpourri Fire Save; Austin Cop Collision"	January 15, 1996	January 25, 2018	5.22 & 5.25
367S	"Quechee Gorge Rescue; 911 Ham Heimlich"	January 16, 1996	January 25, 2018	5.4 & 6.16
368S	"Sewer Pug Save; Sand Embankment Avalanche"	January 17, 1996	January 26, 2018	6.4 & 6.16
369S	"Aussie Santa Save; Christmas Bulb Choke"	January 18, 1996	January 26, 2018	6.13 & 6.13
370S	"911 Son in the Spa; Double Family Rescue"	January 19, 1996	January 26, 2018	5.26 & 5.13
371S	"ATV 5-Year-Old; 911 Honeybee Horror"	January 22, 1996	January 26, 2018	5.8 & 6.14
372S	"Chance Encounter; Baby Bathtub Burn"	January 23, 1996	January 27, 2018	6.18 & 6.26
373S	"Repentant Drunk Driver; 911 5-Year-Old Home Alone"	January 24, 1996	January 27, 2018	6.14 & 5.13
374S	"Twin Car Trauma; Dog Saves Cop"	January 25, 1996	January 27, 2018	6.9 & 2.25
375S	"Bone Marrow Transplant; Virginia Beach EMS"	January 26, 1996	January 27, 2018	5.8 & 1.22
376S	"Uncertified Scuba Diver; Hornet Attack Save"	January 29, 1996	January 27, 2018	5.13 & 6.23
377S	"Speed Dial Burn Save; 911 Pregnant Tumbler"	January 30, 1996	January 27, 2018	5.26 & 6.2
378S	"Hang Glider Hovercraft Rescue; Erianger Medical Center Documentary"	January 31, 1996	unaired	6.2 & 6.8
379S	"911 Runaway Car; Jackson Memorial Documentary"	January 10, 1996	January 29, 2018	6.2 & 6.14
380S	"Victorville Bank Bust; Paramedic Daddy Delivery"	March 8, 1996	January 29, 2018	6.10 & 6.9
381S	"Alaskan Whale Save; New Orleans Docu (Part 1)"	February 26, 1996	January 29, 2018	6.23 & 4.12
382S	"New Orleans Docu (Part 2); Pick-Up Thrown Teen"	February 27, 1996	January 29, 2018	4.12 & 5.27
383S	"Deck Trapped Kid; 911 Hamburger Hold-Up"	February 28, 1996	January 30, 2018	6.15 & 6.29
384S	[title unknown] first segment unknown; prom night allergic reaction	February 1, 1996	unaired	? & 6.18
385S	[title unknown] boy strangles on slide; Oklahoma City bombing	February 2, 1996	unaired	6.26 & 6.27
386S	"911 Accidental Shooting; Drainage Trap"	February 5, 1996	January 30, 2018	6.21 & 6.20
387S	"Riding Mower Mayhem; Bathtub Seizure"	February 6, 1996	January 30, 2018	6.23 & 6.19
388S	"Son Snowboarding Save; 911 Closet Intruder"	February 7, 1996	January 30, 2018	6.27 & 6.21
389S	"Look Both Ways; 911 Sibling Delivery"	February 8, 1996	January 31, 2018	6.20 & 6.24
390S	"Stop, Drop 'n Treehouse; Alcohol Overdose"	February 9, 1996	January 31, 2018	6.19 & 6.15
391S	"911 Don't Talk Now; 8th Floor Miracle Baby"	February 12, 1996	January 31, 2018	6.18 & 6.25
392S	"Phoenix Aerovac Again; 911 Mommy's Bleeding"	February 13, 1996	January 31, 2018	6.25 & 6.21
393S	"Ft. Lauderdale Docu; Horse Crushed Helmet"	February 14, 1996	February 1, 2018	6.15 & 6.15
394S	"Rear End Baby; Window Fall Rescue"	February 15, 1996	February 1, 2018	6.20 & 6.26
395S	"911 Officer Down; Snow Plow Buried Boy"	February 16, 1996	February 1, 2018	6.24 & 6.25
396S	"Jeep Bubble Save; Airborn"	February 19, 1996	February 1, 2018	6.25 & 6.29
397S	"Grandma Fire Save; Zookeeper Down"	February 20, 1996	February 2, 2018	6.19 & 6.27
398S	"Chattahoochee Baby Rescue; Metro Dade Fire/Rescue Doc"	February 21, 1996	February 2, 2018	6.29 & 6.26
399S	"Delta Heart Save; Oregon Dad Saves Daughter"	February 22, 1996	February 2, 2018	6.20 & 6.29
400S	[title unknown] runner collapses; hang glider hits guardrail	February 23, 1996	unaired	6.24 & 6.27

==== Sources ====
The information in the syndicated episode list was obtained from the following sources:

- Episode numbers were obtained on a daily basis from GetTV's show page for Rescue 911 (by clicking the Program Schedule dropdown box) and from Pluto TV's on-demand watchlist for Rescue 911. Episode numbers in italics are unconfirmed by these sources and are assumed based on the episodes airing in sequence with episodes with known numbers.
- Episode titles were obtained from Fancast and TV Guide, except where cited. Titles denoted with an asterisk (*) were obtained Pluto TV's on-demand watchlist for Rescue 911 and may be incomplete, as Pluto TV truncated many of the titles in its listings.
- Justice Network air dates were obtained from TV Guide.
- Original air dates from first-run syndication were obtained from the TV listings sections in the following newspapers through newspapers.com:
  - The Bangor Daily News: "TV Watch" section in Saturday editions (Episodes 126S, 128S-130S, 191S-194S, 196S-200S, 276S-278S, 284S-285S, 296S-305S)
  - The Daily American: "Weekender TV Section" in Saturday editions (Episodes 215S-220S, 236S-240S, 271S-275S, 279S-283S, 286S-295S)
  - The Index-Journal – Greenwood, SC: "TV Index" section in Sunday editions (Episodes 106S-115S, 181S-185S)
  - The Lincoln Journal Star: "TV Week" section in Saturday editions (Episodes 364S-365S, 371S-379S)
  - Miami Herald: "Television" section in daily editions (Episodes 306S, 310S)
  - The Manhattan Mercury: "TV Preview" section in Friday edition (Episodes 386S-390S)
  - Press-Tribune: "TV Week" section in Sunday edition (Episodes 361S-363S)
  - The Record: "Television & Cable" section in Sunday editions, "Television" section in daily editions (Episodes 101S-105S, 127S, 136S-150S)
  - The San Bernardino County Sun: "Today's Highlights" section in daily editions (Episodes 186S-190S, 195S)
  - The Sentinel: "Local Listings" section in Saturday editions (Episodes 116S-125S, 131S-135S, 151S-155S, 161S-180S, 201S-205S, 211S-214S, 221S-235S, 241S-270S, 311S-360S, 366S-370S)
  - Statesman Journal: "Entertainment" section in daily editions (Episodes 206S-210S)
  - The Times: "TV Times" section in Sunday editions (Episodes 307S-309S, 380S-383S, 391S-400S)
  - Wausau Daily Herald: "TV Week" section in Sunday edition (Episodes 156S-160S)

== Unaired Stories ==
Several segments were filmed for Rescue 911 that never aired on the show. The following segments were reported in various local newspapers.

- A boy and his great-grandfather lost in the wilderness: In August 1989, ahead of the first-season premiere, Rescue 911 film crews traveled to Centralia, Washington to film a segment about a ten-year-old boy and his great grandfather who were lost for five days in the hills of the Coast Range near Pe Ell, Washington. The would-be segment was to run nine minutes and was tentatively planned to air in the fall but never materialized. A similar segment about two girls lost near Colorado's Devil's Head Lookout aired that November, and another about a young boy lost in New Mexico's Pecos Wilderness aired the following spring.
- A snorkeling accident leaves a man with air embolisms: In August 1992, Rescue 911 crews filmed a segment about an incident that occurred earlier that year in Florida's Vortex Spring. A snorkeler swam 30 feet down to investigate an overturned cattle trough with an air pocket inside (called the "talk box") that scuba divers use to talk to one another underwater. The man inhaled the pressurized air inside the talk box and resurfaced too quickly without exhaling, which caused the air in his lungs to expand rapidly and rupture multiple airways, releasing deadly air bubbles into his bloodstream. He was treated in a hyperbaric chamber and subsequently made a full recovery, despite the expectations of hospital staff. The segment was expected to air in fall of 1992, during the show's fourth season.
- A deaf couple uses a TDD to call for help: In August 1993, a segment was filmed in Midland, Texas about a deaf man who used a TDD to communicate with a 911 operator when his wife, who was also deaf, suffered heart failure. She was rushed to the hospital where she underwent a life-saving quadruple bypass operation. The couple opted to play themselves in the re-enactment. The segment was filmed by Katy Productions, a Los Angeles-based production company. It would have likely aired in the fifth season.
- A newly installed smoke detector saves a family: In May 1995, Rescue 911 crews filmed a segment in Windsor, Ontario about a mother and her two-year-old son who escaped a fire thanks to a newly installed smoke detector. Earlier on the day of the incident, she had called the local fire department when he got his head stuck in a rocking chair. While responding to the call, the firefighters noticed they had no smoke detector in their apartment and installed one for them. Just hours later, a fire broke out in the kitchen while they slept. The smoke alarm awakened the mother and allowed her to safely escape with her son. The segment was expected to air sometime in the seventh season.
