= Mineralogy of the Pikes Peak Region =

Mineralogy of a mountainous region in the USA

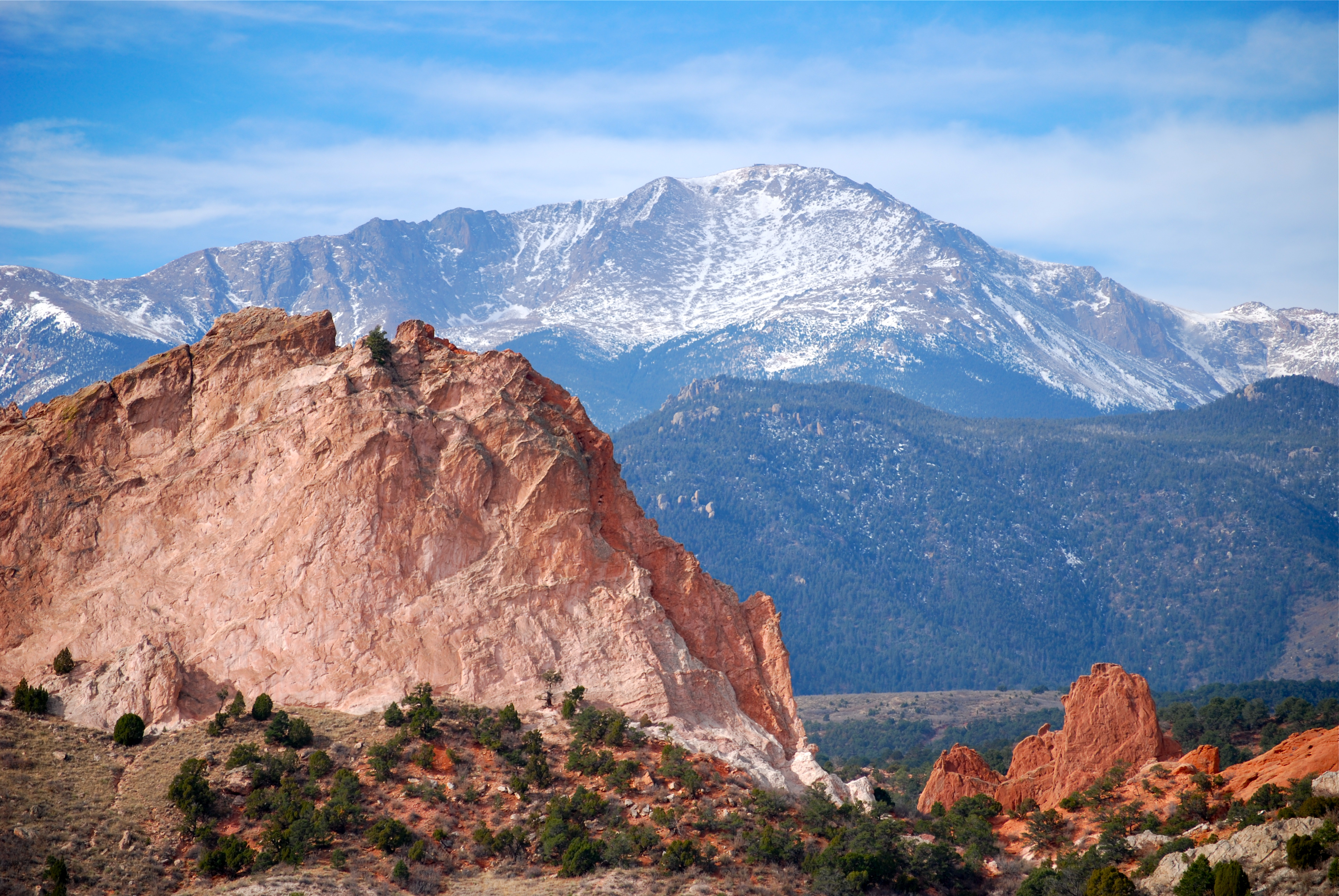
Pikes Peak seen from the Garden of the Gods.

The Pikes Peak region is renowned for its rare mineral specimens. It is a favorite collecting area for amateur and serious rock hounds. Scientists from around the world come to Colorado to study the minerals of this region. Because the granite covers a large portion of the Colorado Front Range, there are good mineral collecting areas scattered all over the Pikes Peak region. The collecting localities range from near Colorado Springs on the south to just west of Denver on the north.

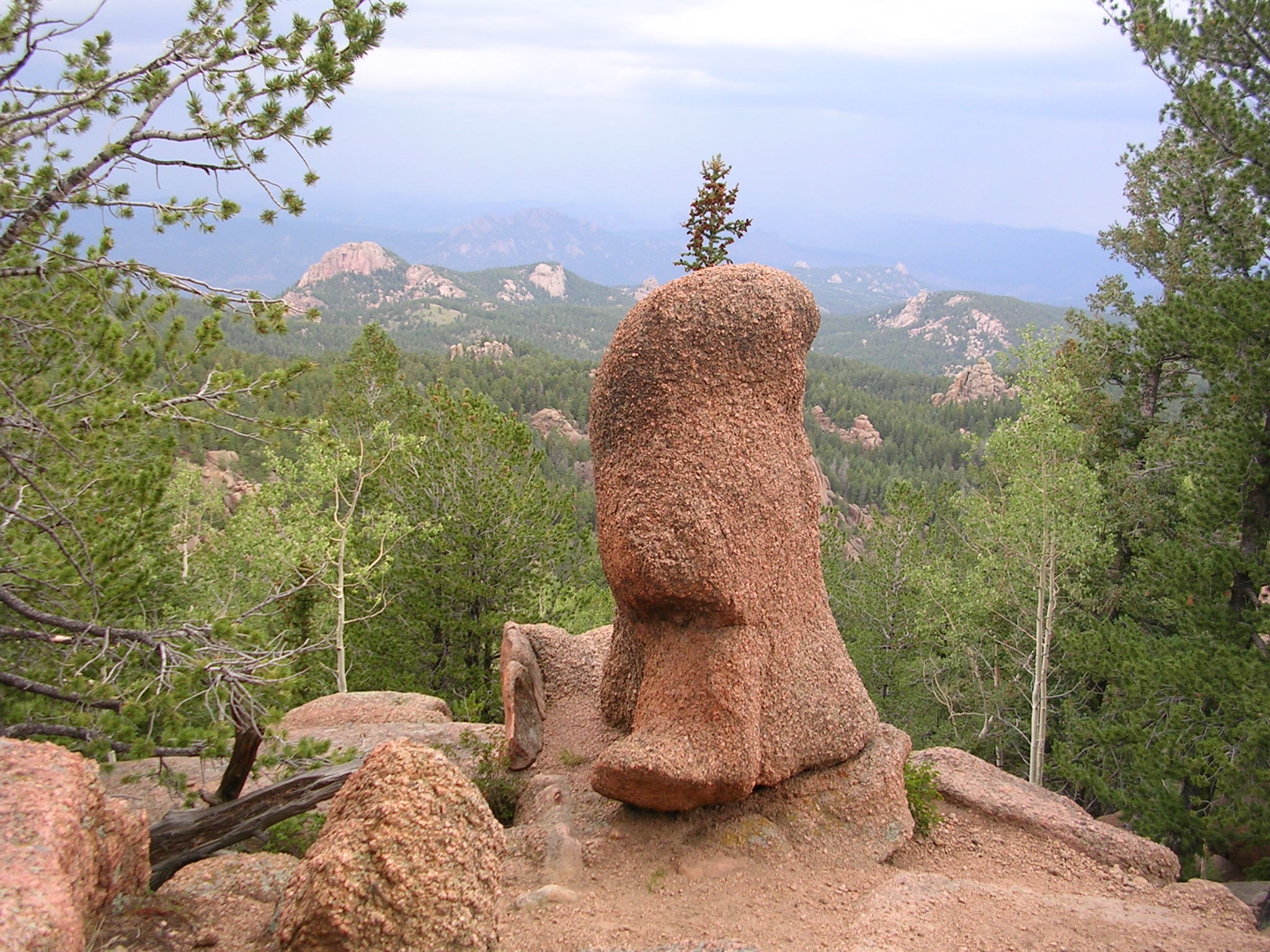
Pikes Peak granite in Pike National Forest taken from the trail to the Devil's Head Lookout

== Geological history ==
The Pikes Peak granite formed in several stages. In the initial stage, about 1.02 billion years ago, a large mass of magma intruded into what is now the Front Range of Colorado. Although there may have been volcanoes overlying the intrusion, the majority of the magma never reached the surface, but formed and cooled at a depth of about 1 to 2 miles (1.6 to 3.3 km). Ultimately, the underground extent of the magma covered an area of 1,200 square miles (3,100 km^{2}). Later on, over the next 40-million years, newer pulses of magma pushed into the existing granite, re-melting and pushing it aside to form, what are now called "intrusive centers." As the magma flowed into these intrusive centers, it tended to form a circular masses of rock with concentric rings of varying composition that look something like a bulls eye. The granite in the intrusive centers is different from the original granite, with higher concentrations of rare elements and more exotic minerals. Some of the best mineral collecting areas in Colorado can be found around the edges of these intrusive centers.

When a new pulse of magma forced its way upward, the edges in contact with the older magma cooled rapidly forming a kind of "skin" of fine-grained granite. Since fine-grained granite is less porous, this "outer skin" sealed the magma body and helped to trap rare elements and water inside. Over time, the water and rare elements were concentrated along the edges of the magma.

While the magma cooled and crystallized, the water content of the remaining liquid magma increased rapidly. This is because molten magma can hold water, but the solid crystals cannot. As a result, as each crystal is formed, the water that was contained in the original molten magma is forced out of the crystal. As more crystals are formed, more water is concentrated in less and less magma.

As the water and certain elements were concentrated along the edges of the magma, even larger crystals began to form. At the same time, the water helped produce open pockets called miarolitic cavities. The cavities are important because they allow the crystals to grow freely without interference from other crystal faces or the surrounding rock. Although good crystal occur within solid masses of rock, the most perfectly formed specimens usually come from miarolitic cavities.

Because the intrusive centers were often circular and the cooling took place from the outside in, certain minerals were concentrated in ring-shaped zones around the edges of an intrusive center. For example, in the Tarryall region, most of the topaz is found near the edges of the intrusion.

== Collecting areas ==
There are seven major collecting areas within the Pikes Peak granite. All of the collecting areas have the same basic assemblage minerals, predominately consisting of smoky quartz crystals and amazonite, with topaz, phenakite and other rarer minerals in certain areas. Although most collecting areas have this same basic assortment of minerals, each area is distinctive and tends to feature certain minerals over others.

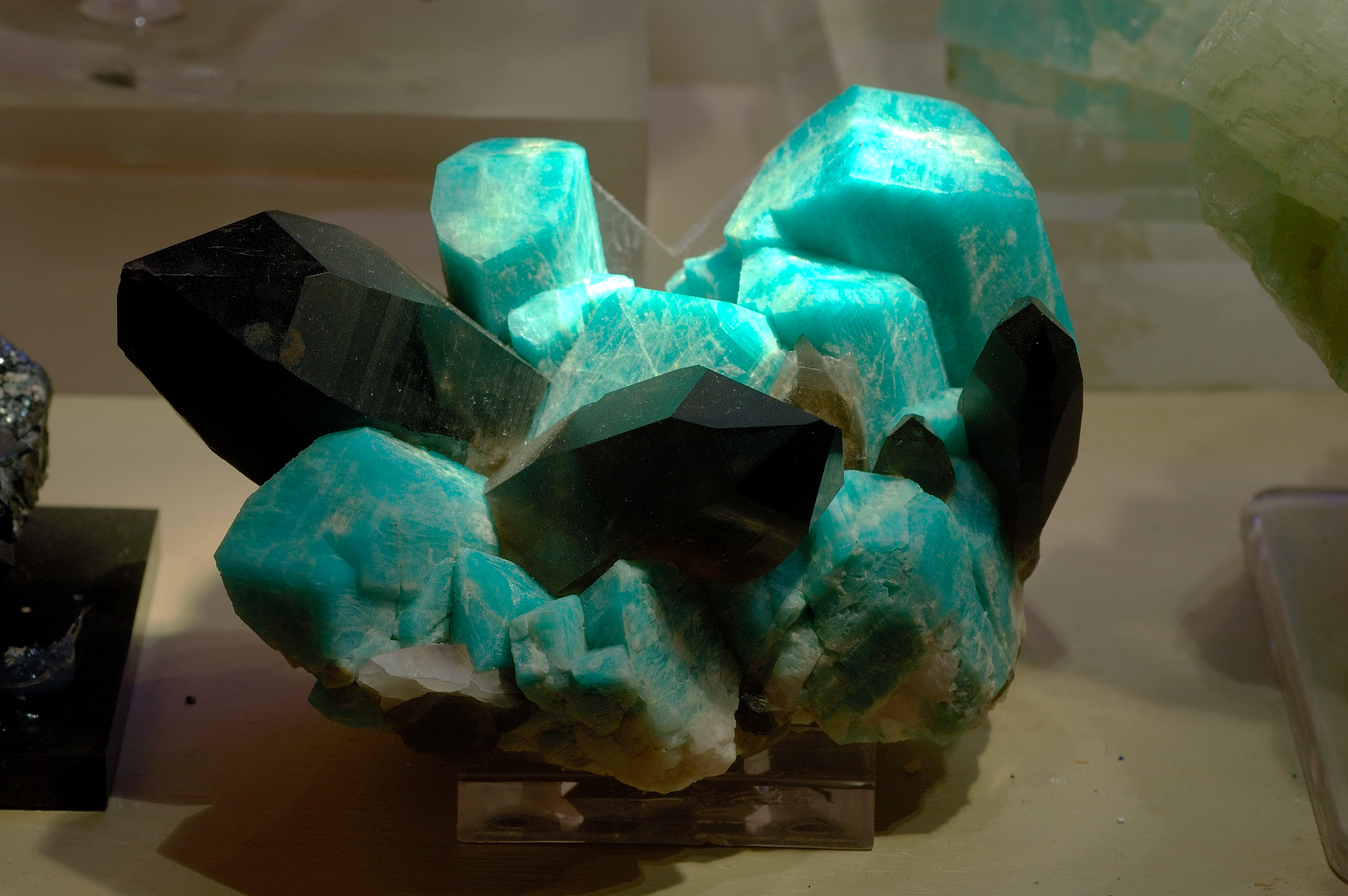
Microcline feldspar variety amazonite with smoky quartz from Two Point Claim, Teller County

The collecting area, starting from the southernmost localities, include:

=== Gold Camp Road ===
The Gold Camp Road is old railroad grade that runs from Colorado Springs to Cripple Creek. It was one of the three railroads that served the Cripple Creek Mining District at the turn of the 20th century. It can be reached from Colorado Springs by driving up North Cheyenne Cañon.

The collecting areas start around Helen Hunt Falls and extend south to St. Peter's Dome and to the North as far as the High Drive. In addition to the typical smoky quartz crystals and amazonite, the Gold Camp Road area contains several minerals that are relatively rare in other parts of region. The area has an abundance of fluorine minerals such as fluorite and more rare minerals such as cryolite, bastnäsite and tysonite. Several localities contain the rare amphibole riebeckite and the even more rare mineral astrophyllite. Finally, there are several locations where large and colorful crystals of zircon can be found.

=== Crystal Park ===
To the north is Crystal Park. Crystal Park is situated on the eastern slope of Camerons Cone, a 10,700-foot (3,300 m) conical peak southeast of the summit of Pikes Peak. Just to the east of Camerons Cone, the mountains form a protected, bowl-shaped valley called Crystal Park. It can be reached by a well maintained automobile road from Manitou Springs and by several trails from the southeast and east. Currently much of the park is a private home development. The collecting area ranges from the Northern slopes of Camerons Cone to Specimen Rock on the south. Much of this area is National Forest.

Like all the other Pikes Peak collecting areas, Crystal Park contains the usual smoky quartz and amazonite crystals. In addition, topaz is more abundant here than in the Gold Camp road area.

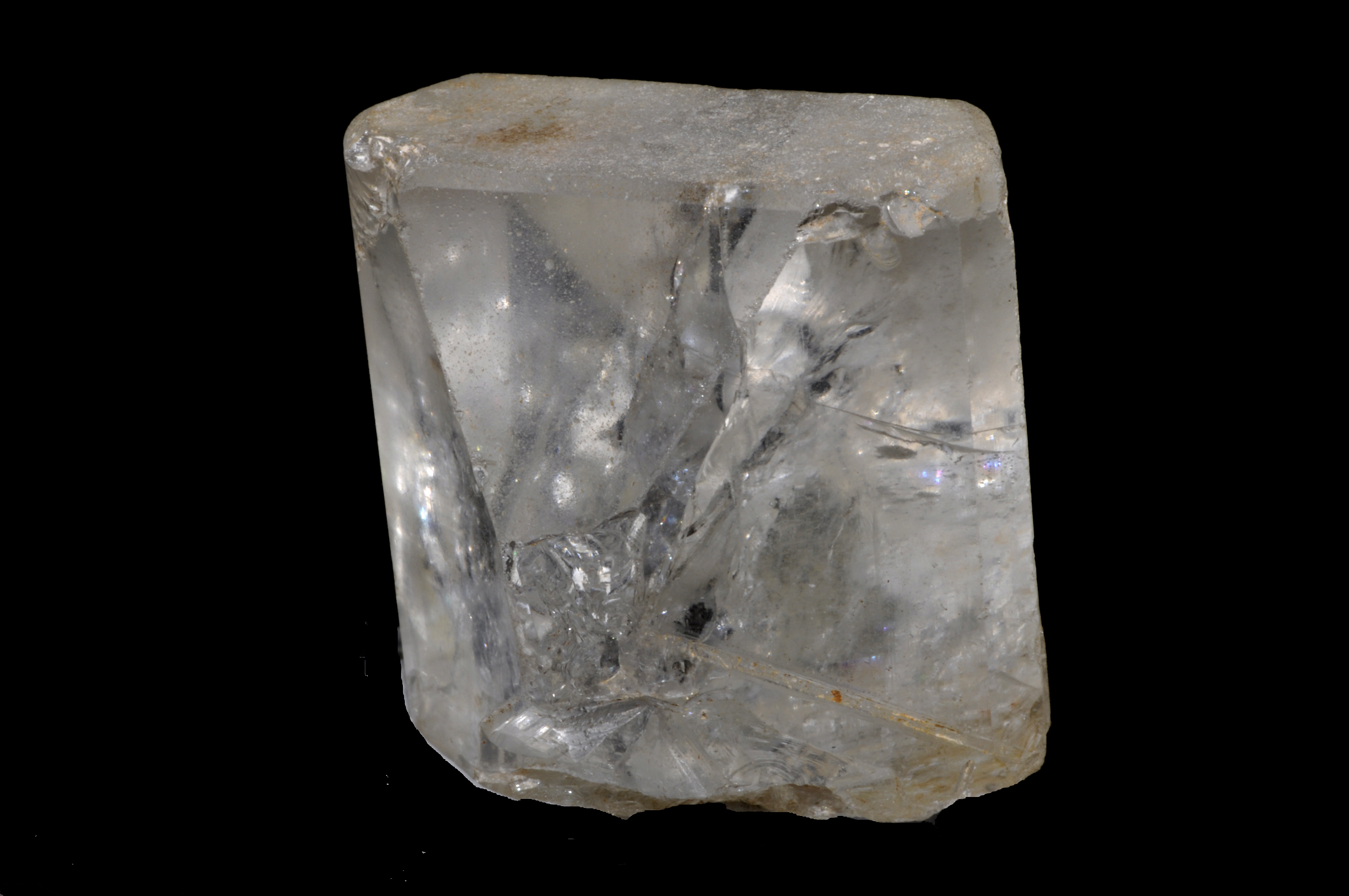
Typical topaz crystal

=== Pikes Peak ===
Pikes Peak is itself, an intrusive center and smoky quartz and amazonite can be found in many areas within four miles (6 km) of the summit. For example, amazonite can be found next to Barr Trail, the main hiking route to the summit of Pikes Peak. The most famous collecting area on the Peak is Glenn Cove, a glacial cirque located at 11,000 feet (3,400 m) on the north side of the mountain. Quartz crystals, amazonite and topaz crystals can be found in pockets on steep cliffs in this area.

=== Crystal Peak ===
Crystal Peak is located about 35 miles (56 km) west of Colorado Springs on Highway 24. It is north of the highway and between Florissant and Lake George. Crystal Peak itself is a distinctive, conical knoll about 3.5 miles (5.6 km) due north of Florissant. Geologically, it is also an intrusive center and the geological maps show a very characteristic ring-shaped structure about 5 miles (8.0 km) in diameter.

Like Crystal Park, the eastern part of the Crystal Peak area is on private land and has been converted into a housing development. Nevertheless, the Western and North parts of the region are on National Forest land.

Crystal Peak is one of the most famous mineral collecting localities in Colorado. Specimens from Crystal Peak are sometimes referred to as coming from Lake George or Florissant, but the actual collecting area is located near Crystal Peak. The area has produced some of the finest smoky quartz and amazonite specimens in the world. It is especially noted for specimens that combine deep black smoky quartz crystals intermixed with deep blue amazonite. Other minerals such as topaz, fluorite and goethite have been found in the area.

=== Tarryall Mountains ===
The Tarryall Mountains are located about 12 miles (19 km) north of Lake George. They represent an intrusive center called the Redskin Stock. Like the other localities in the region, smoky quartz and amazonite are the primary minerals, however, the amazonite is usually very pale and grading into ordinary pink or white microcline feldspar.

The Tarryall Mountains are famous as being one of the better topaz localities in the region. They are found in the typical pegmatite veins and pockets, but also as placer deposits where flowing water and gravity have sorted the slightly heavier topaz to the bottom of gravels.

=== Devils Head ===
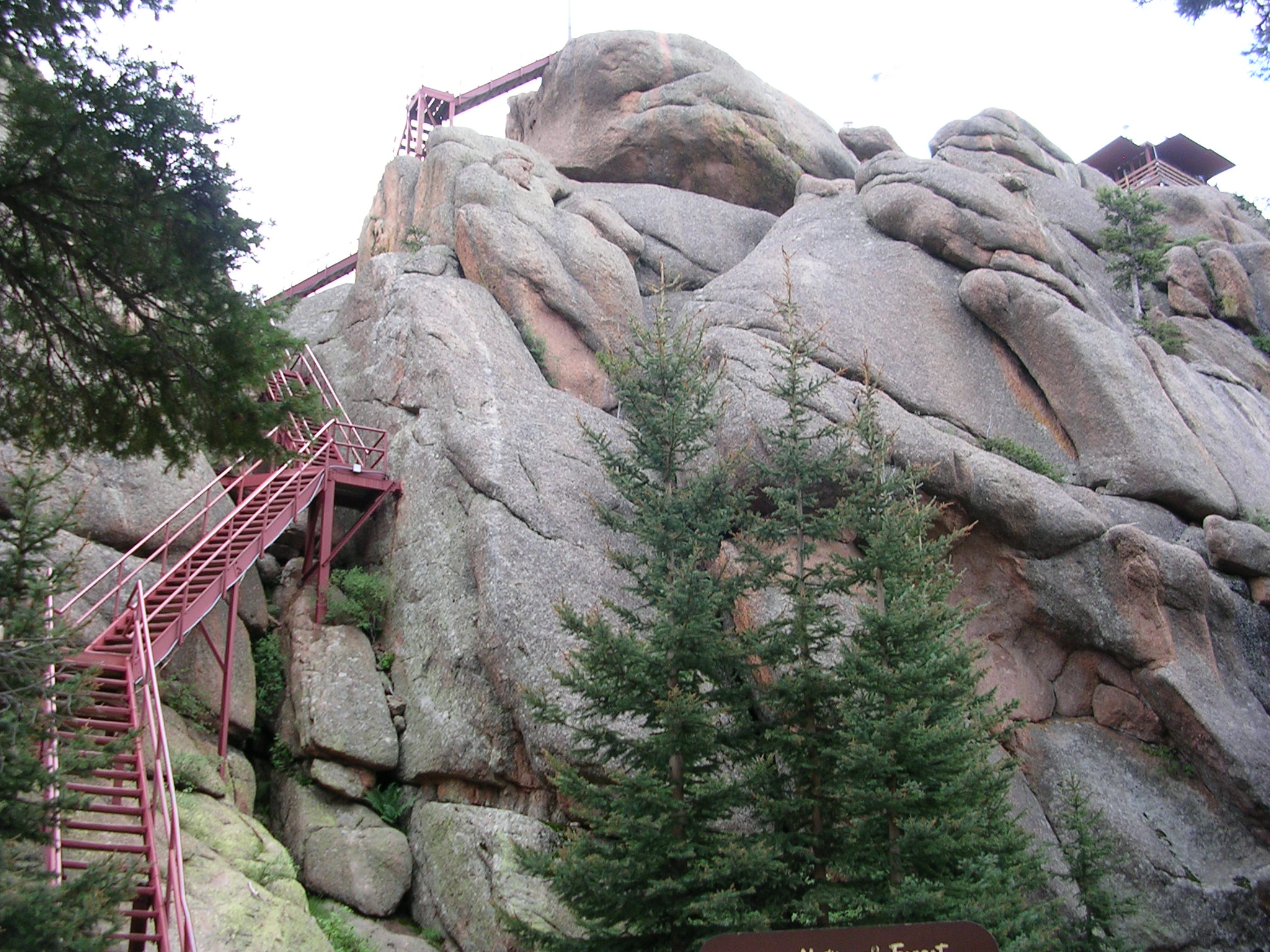
Stairway leading to summit of Devils Head

Devils Head is located about 33 miles (53 km) south-south west of Denver on the Rampart Range Road. Like the other localities, Devils Head is another intrusive center and it forms a prominent, 9,700 feet (3,000 m) peak whose pinnacles are easily visible from Denver.

The major collecting areas are on the west side of the mountain and they contain the usual assortment of smoky quartz and amazonite, although, like the Tarryalls, the amazonite is usually very pale and is most often grades into plain microcline.

Devils Head is most noted for large topaz crystals and even larger smoky quartz crystals. Perfect crystals of gem quality, deep black, smoky quartz, several feet in length have been found in the area.

=== Rosalie Lobe ===
The Rosalie Lobe is located on the southeast slope of Mount Evans the prominent 14,000-foot (4,300 m) peak just west of Denver. The Rosalie Lobe is interesting because it is an isolated lobe of the Pike Peak Granite, separated by five miles from the main body of the intrusion. It is accessible from Highway 285 from the town Harris Park which is about 30 miles (48 km) southwest of Denver.

The Rosalie Lobe contains the same minerals that are found in the intrusive centers further to the south, most notably smoky quartz, amazonite and topaz.
