= Devil's Head =

Devil's Head or Devils Head may refer to:

Places

- Devil's Head, a balancing rock at Chimney Rock State Park in North Carolina, United States
- Devils Head (summit), a summit in the Rampart Range of central Colorado, United States
  - Devil's Head Lookout, a U.S. Forest Service fire lookout tower at Devils Head summit
- Devil's Head Resort, in Merrimac, Sauk County, Wisconsin
- The Devil's Heads, or Čertovy hlavy, in situ rock sculptures by Václav Levý near Želízy in the Czech Republic

Other

- Echinocactus horizonthalonius, a cactus also known as "devil's head"
- Hong Kong ten-cent coin, nicknamed the "devil's head" by residents of the southeastern provinces of China in the early 1990s
- 1954 Series (banknotes), nicknamed "Devil's Head" because of the illusion of a grinning demon behind the ear in the portrait of Elizabeth II
- Onigawara, also known as "devil's head tiles", adornments for cornices in Japanese architecture
- Sign of the horns, a hand gesture sometimes interpreted as a devil's head
