= Long Scraggy Peak =

Mountain in the U.S. state of Colorado

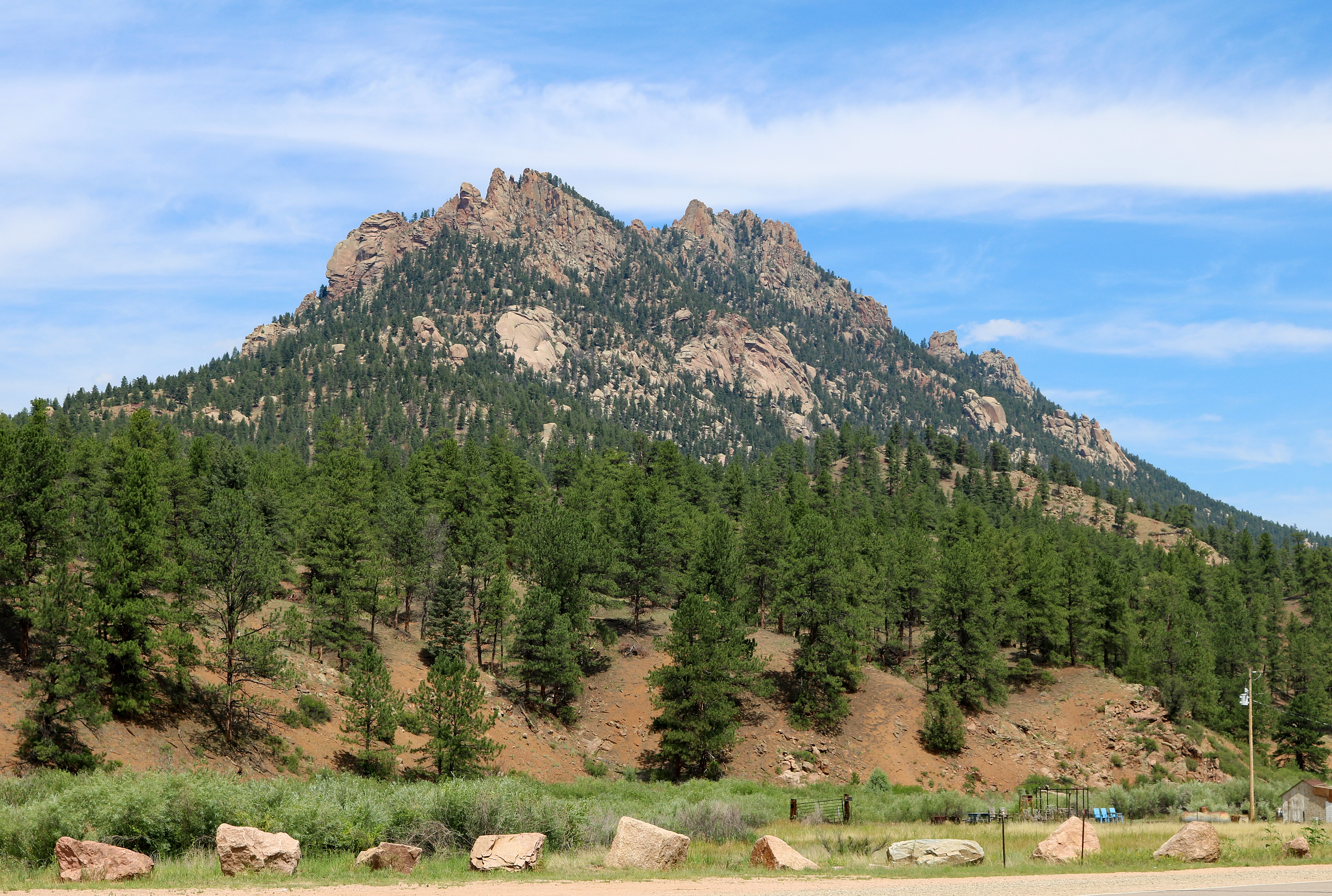
- The mountain in 2018

Highest point
- Elevation: 8,796 ft (2,681 m)
- Prominence: 1,252 ft (382 m)
- Isolation: 4.1 mi (6.6 km)
- Coordinates: 39°20′57″N 105°12′07″W

Geography
- Location within Colorado
- Location: Jefferson County, Colorado
- Parent range: Front Range
- Topo map: USGS Deckers

Long Scraggy Peak is a mountain in Jefferson County, Colorado. A prominent peak, it is characterized by its elongated, craggy ridge, for which it is named. The mountain is located within the Pike National Forest near the confluence of the North Fork South Platte River and the South Platte River.

The peak, elevation 8,796 feet (2,681 meters), is popular among mountain climbers, day hikers, and rock climbers, especially in winter, as the peak's relatively low elevation means there's often less snow than on higher peaks.

== Geology ==
The peak is made up of Pikes Peak granite.
