= Devil's Head Lookout =

- Devil's Head Lookout Hike & Tower
- U.S. National Register of Historic Places
- Colorado State Register of Historic Properties
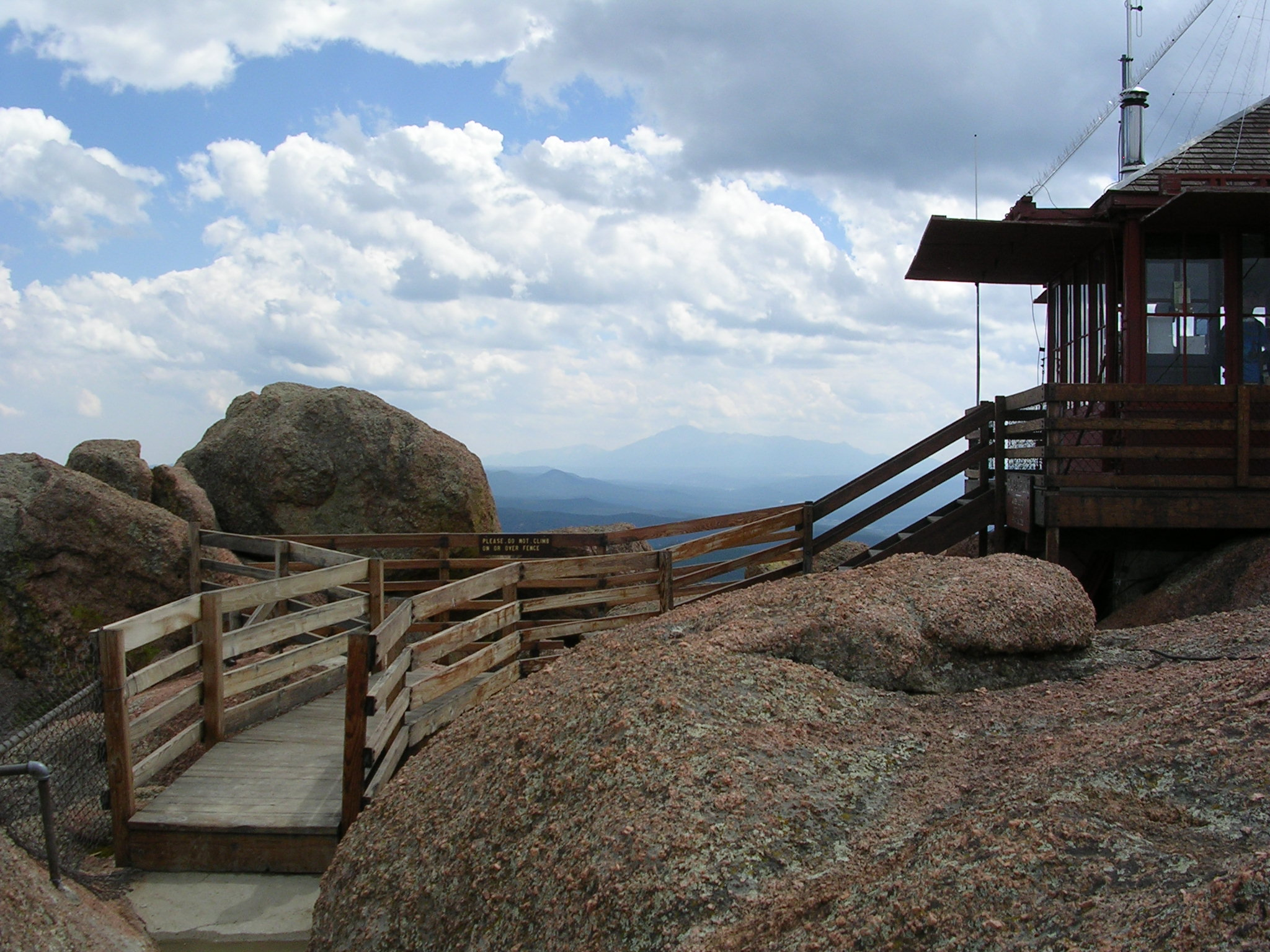
- A picture of the watchtower with Pikes Peak in the background.
- Location: Douglas County, Colorado
- Coordinates: 39°15′37.42″N 105°6′6.64″W
- Built: (original built) 1912, (remodeled)1951
- NRHP reference No.: 03000518
- CSRHP No.: 5DA.960
- Added to NRHP: June 13, 2003

Devil's Head Lookout is a U.S. Forest Service fire lookout tower at the summit of Devils Head in Douglas County, Colorado. Located on a large pinnacle of Pikes Peak granite, the fire lookout point lies within the Pike National Forest and is accessed by hiking the Devils Head National Recreation Trail.

The station was first established in 1912, with the original tower built in 1919. In the summer of 1951, the old tower was dismantled and current structure was built. In 1991, Devil's Head Lookout was added to the National Register of Historic Places. Sitting at the highest point of Rampart Range, the fire lookout is the last remaining such structure to be in service along the Front Range of Colorado.

The view from the current structure extends at least 100 miles in every direction on clear days.

The lookout (elev. 9748 feet, or 2971 m) can be accessed via easy/moderate trail (2.8 miles, or 4.5 km round trip) with elevation gain of 951 feet, or 290 m. The last stretch is a climb on 143 stairs. The access is from Rampart Range Road, a 14.5-km dirt road (easily accessible by passenger cars) from CO67. Note that the road to the trailhead is always closed to vehicles during the winter and typically does not open until April or May.

== Gallery ==
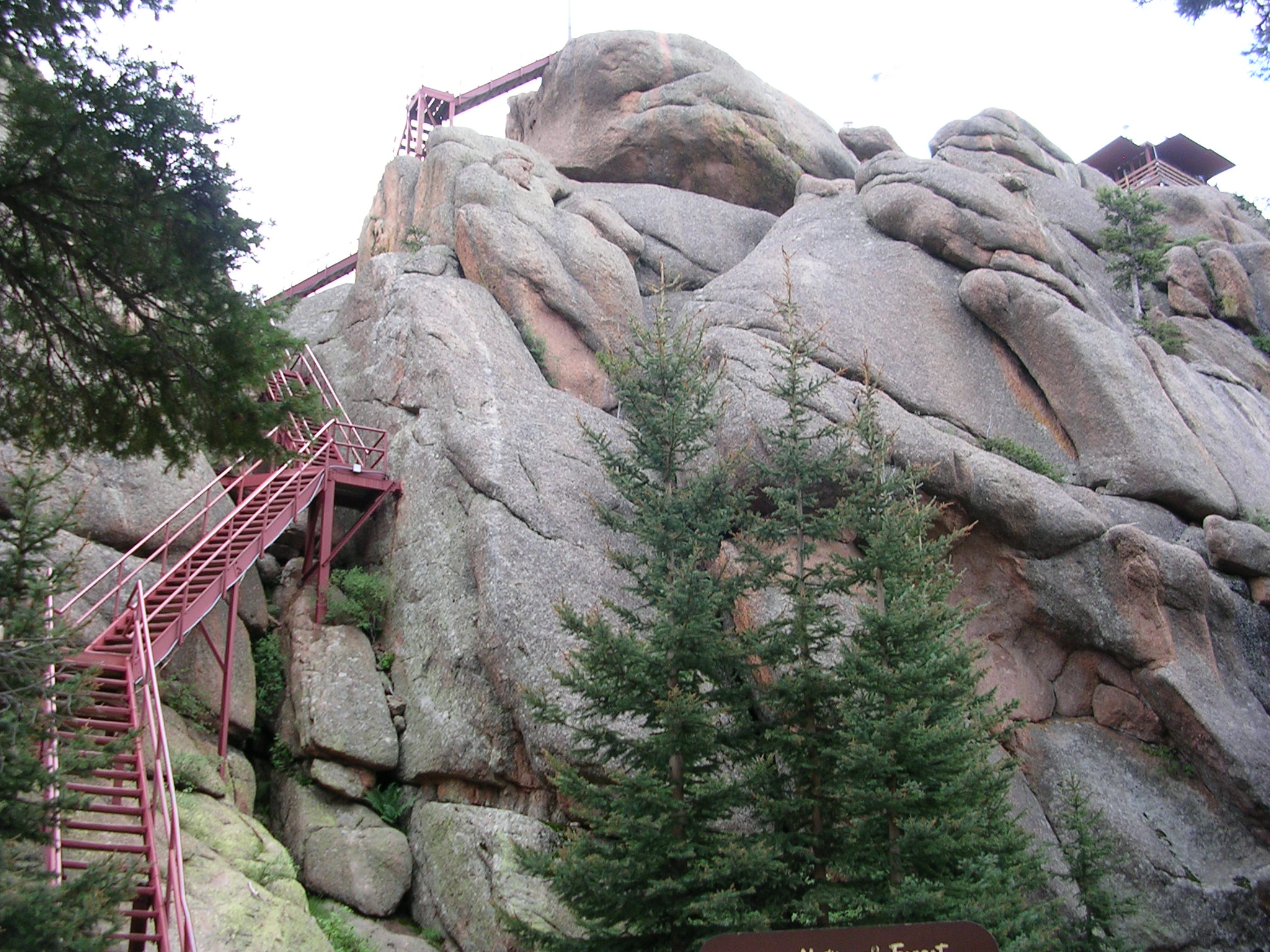
The stairs at the base of the tower. The tower itself is visible in the upper right.

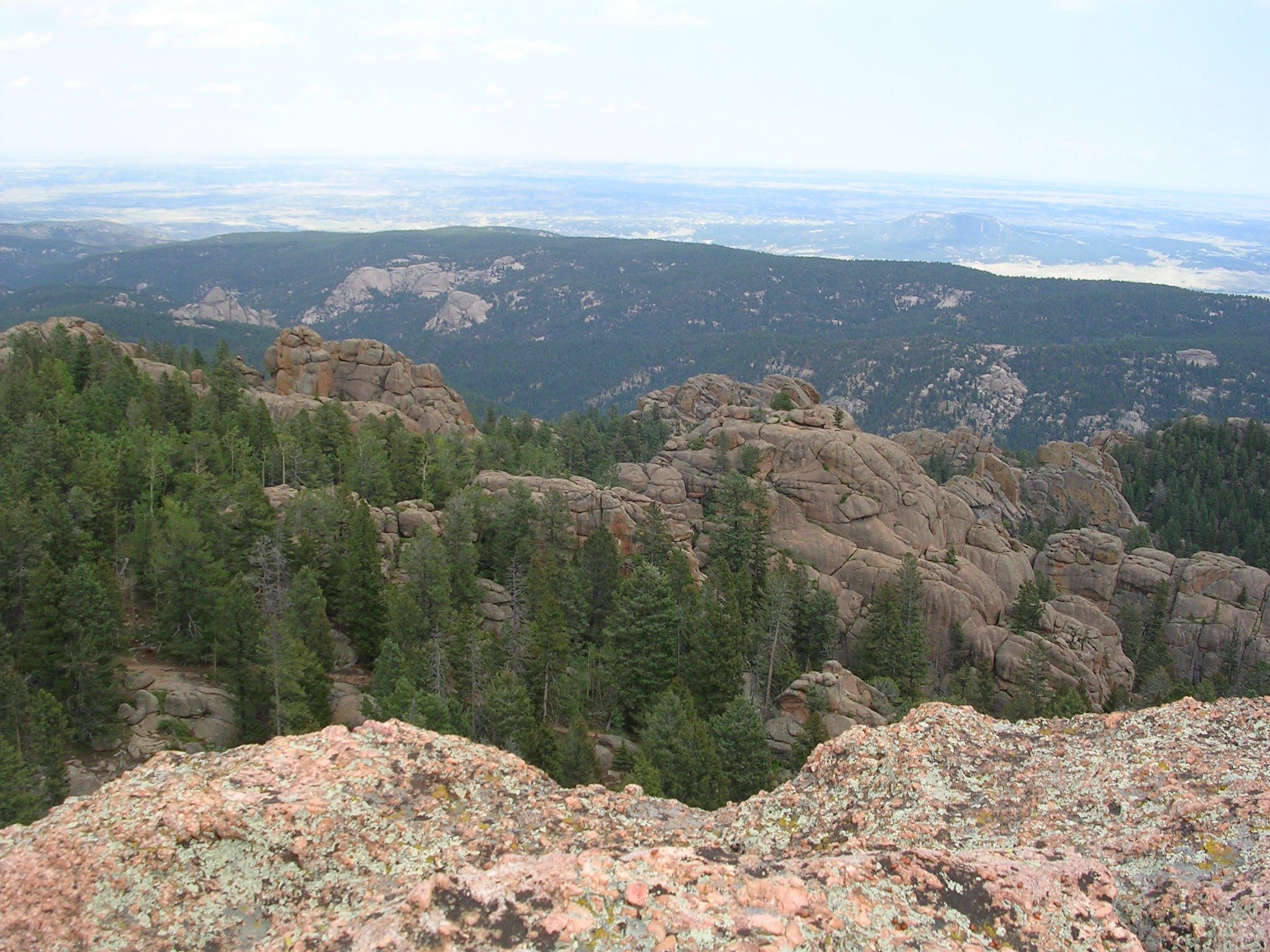
View from the top of the Devil's Head Lookout. Pike National Forest is in the foreground, while the city of Denver is in the distance.

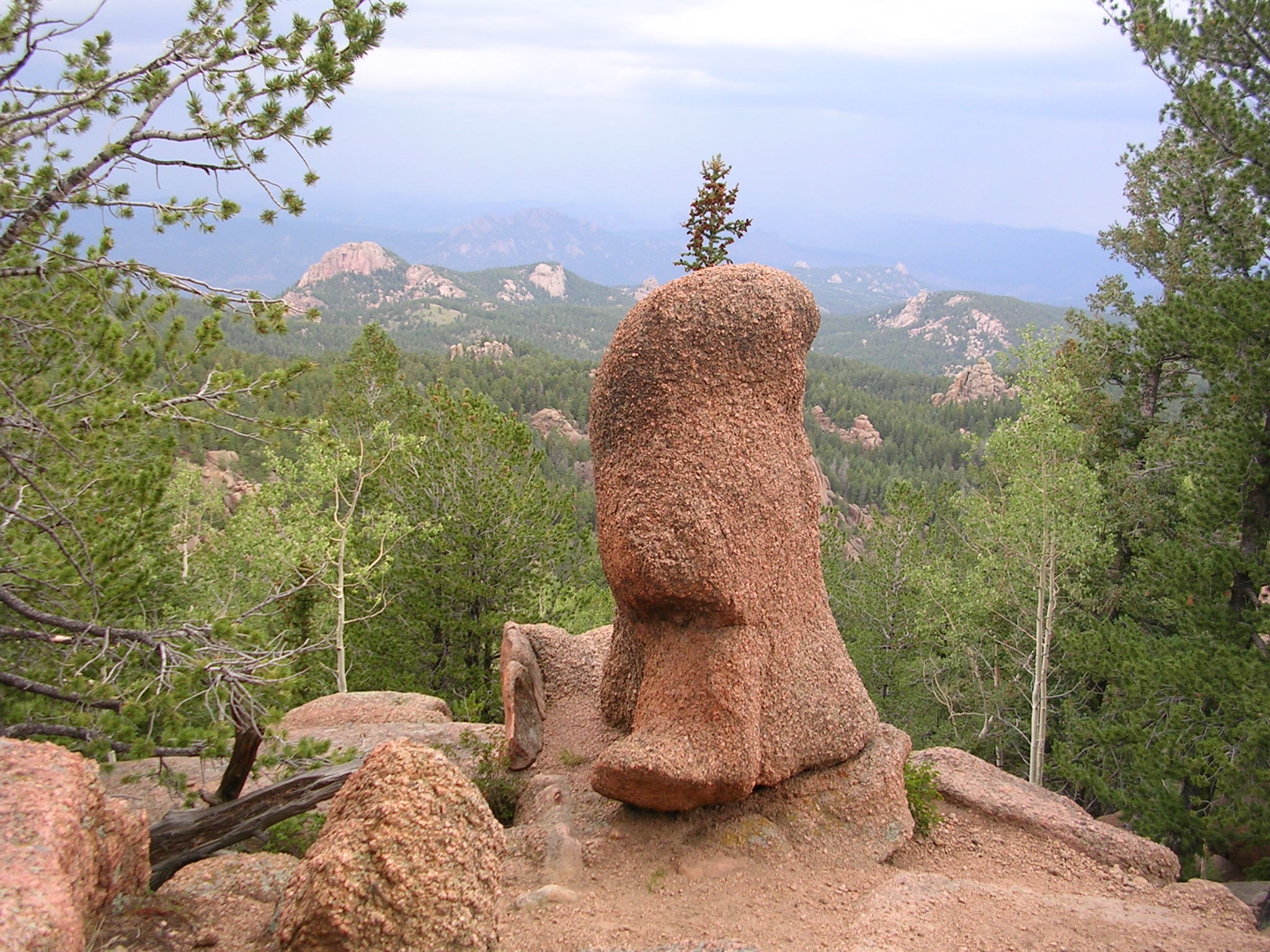
The trail leading to the lookout tower passes many boulders made of Pike's Peak granite, such as this one.

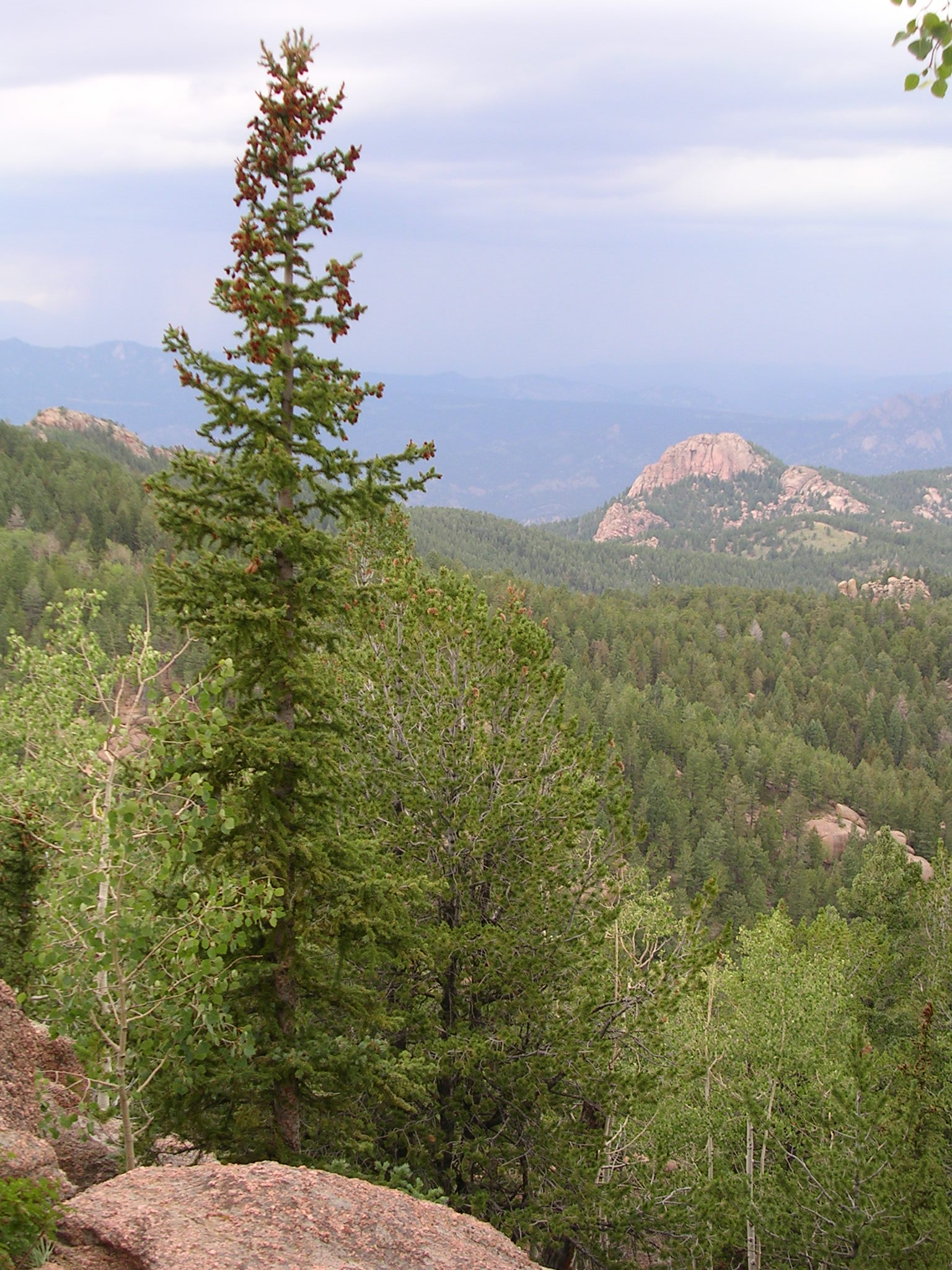
A view from the trail leading to the tower.

== See also ==
- National Register of Historic Places listings in Douglas County, Colorado

== See also ==
- Front Range
- Mountain peaks of Colorado
- Mountain peaks of North America
- Mountain peaks of the Rocky Mountains
- Mountain peaks of the United States
- Mountain ranges of Colorado
- Rampart Range
- Southern Rocky Mountains
