= Skuleboda =

Mine in Sweden

Skuleboda mine
- Location in Sweden
- Location: Vänersborg, Västra Götaland, Sweden; 58°20′37.14″N 12°9′26.31″E
- Products: Feldspar
- Opened: 1927
- Closed: 1934

Skuleboda (Swedish: Skuleboda kvartsfältspatbrott) was a quartz and feldspar mine near Vänersborg, in western Sweden. Mining at Skuleboda begun in 1927, then halted the same year and continued again from 1931 to 1934. The mined deposit is a pegmatite with a length of 45 m and a maximum width of 10 m. It contains amazonite feldspar. Rare occurrences of yttrotantalite has been found in the mined pegmatite.
