= Rampart Range =

Mountain range in Colorado, United States

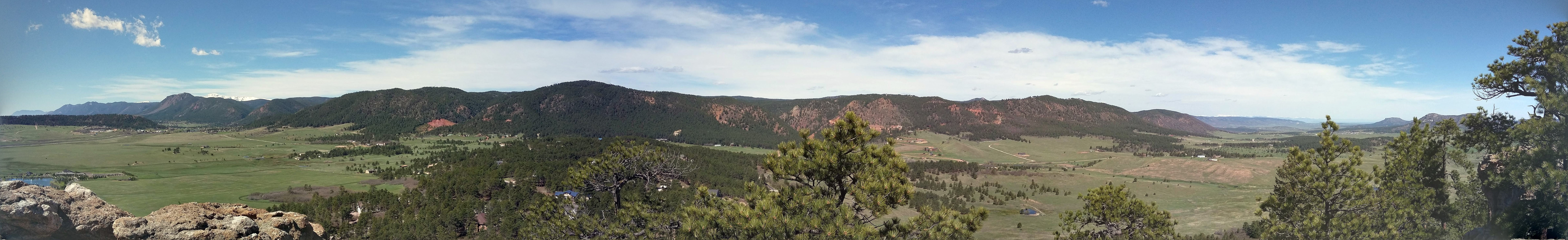
- Rampart Range seen from Windy Point atop Spruce Mountain

Highest point
- Peak: Devils Head
- Elevation: 9,748 ft (2,971 m)
- Listing: Mountain ranges of Colorado
- Coordinates: 39°15′38″N 105°06′04″W

Dimensions
- Length: 44 mi (71 km)
- Width: 12 mi (19 km)

Geography
- Location within Colorado
- Country: United States
- State: Colorado
- Counties: Douglas, El Paso and Teller
- Parent range: Front Range, Rocky Mountains

The Rampart Range is a mountain range in the western United States in Colorado, located in Douglas, El Paso, and Teller counties. Part of the Front Range of the Rocky Mountains, the range is almost entirely public land within the Pike National Forest.

The Rampart Range is delineated by the South Platte River on the north and Manitou Springs and Woodland Park on the south. The western border is formed by faults along the South Platte River and Trout Creek. The eastern border of the range is the steep, faulted escarpment down to the Colorado Piedmont. In total, the range is 44 miles (71 km) long and 12 miles (19 km) at its widest.

The high point of the Rampart Range is Devils Head at an elevation of 9,748 feet (2,971 m). Several other peaks in the range are over 9,000 feet (2,743 m), but these elevations stand in contrast to the higher peaks of the Front Range to the north (Mount Blue Sky) and south (Pikes Peak).

== Geology ==
The Rampart Range is a anticlinal horst raised along faults on the east, west, and south sides. The region has experienced repeated periods of uplift, erosion, and deposition over the past 1,000 million years. Currently, uplifted Proterozoic basement rocks of the Pikes Peak batholith dominate the Rampart Range. Nearly all overlying sedimentary and volcanic rocks have been eroded away.
