= Amazonite =

Green variety of microcline

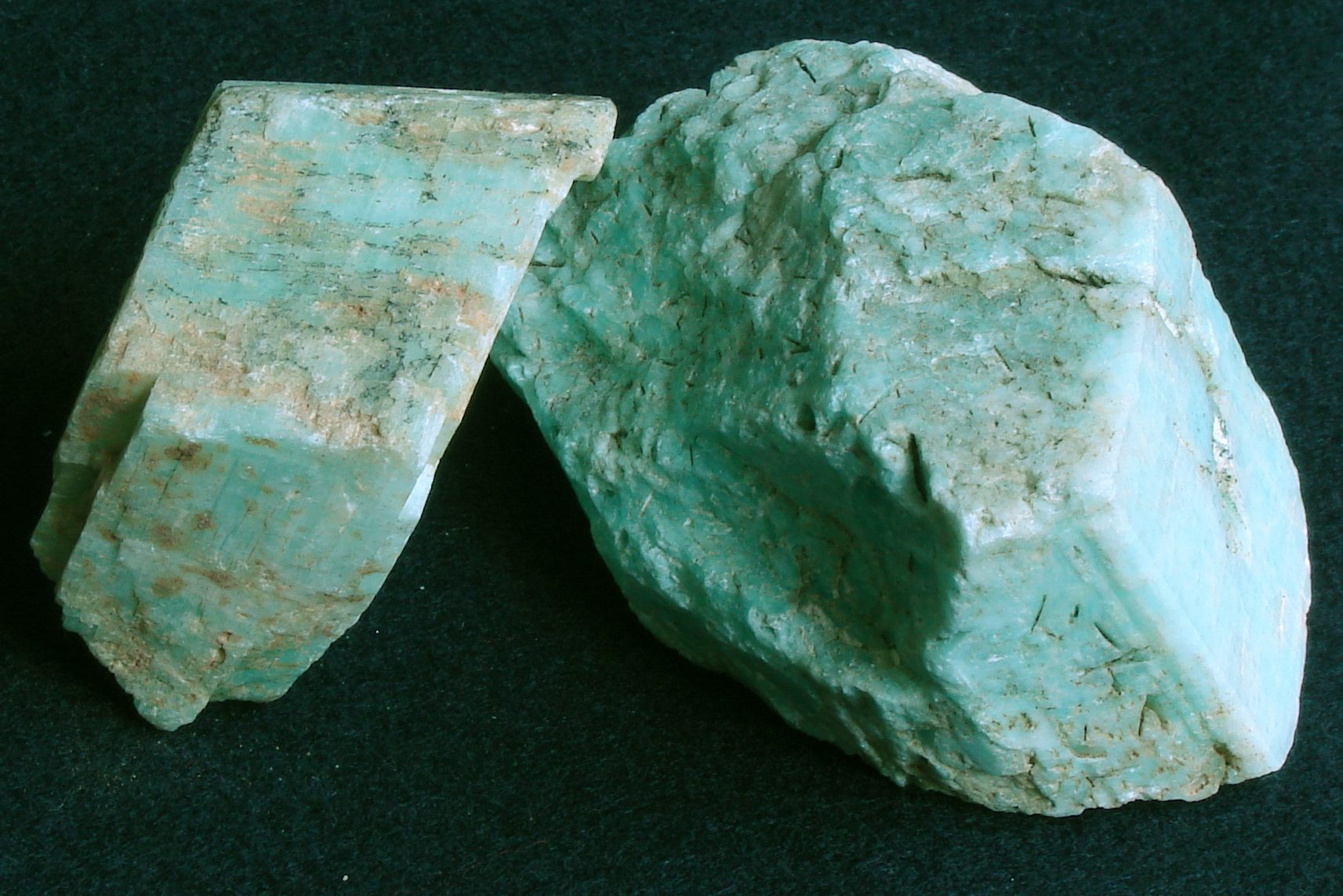
- Amazonite from Brazil

General
- Category: Tectosilicate minerals
- Group: Feldspar group
- Series: Alkali feldspar series
- Formula: KAlSi_{3}O_{8}
- IMA status: Variety of microcline
- Crystal system: Triclinic

Identification
- Color: Green, blue-green
- Crystal habit: Prismatic
- Cleavage: Perfect
- Fracture: Uneven, splintery
- Tenacity: Brittle
- Mohs scale hardness: 6.0–6.5
- Luster: Vitreous
- Streak: White
- Diaphaneity: Translucent, opaque
- Specific gravity: 2.56–2.58
- Refractive index: 1.522–1.530
- Birefringence: −0.008
- Pleochroism: Absent
- Dispersion: None
- Ultraviolet fluorescence: Weak; olive-green
- Other characteristics: Radioactive 14.05% (K)
- References: ^{:214–215}

Amazonite, also known as amazonstone, is a green tectosilicate mineral, a variety of the potassium feldspar called microcline. Its chemical formula is KAlSi_{3}O_{8}, which is polymorphic to orthoclase.

The name is derived from the Amazon River, from which green stones were once believed to have been obtained, although it remains uncertain whether those stones were actually amazonite. Although amazonite has been used for jewellery for more than three thousand years, as evidenced by archaeological finds in Middle and New Kingdom Egypt and Mesopotamia, it is not mentioned by any ancient or medieval sources. It was first described as a distinct mineral in the 18th century.

Green and greenish-blue varieties of potassium feldspars that are predominantly triclinic are designated as amazonite. It has been described as a "beautiful crystallized variety of a bright verdigris-green" and as possessing a "lively green colour". It is occasionally cut and used as a gemstone.

== Occurrence ==
Amazonite is a mineral of limited occurrence. In Bronze Age Egypt, it was mined in the southern Eastern Desert at Gebel Migif. In early modern times, it was obtained almost exclusively from the area of Miass in the Ilmensky Mountains, 50 miles (80 km) southwest of Chelyabinsk, Russia, where it occurs in granitic rocks.

Amazonite is now known to occur in various places around the world. Those places are, among others, as follows:

Australia:

- Eyre Peninsula, Koppio, Baila Hill Mine (Koppio Amazonite Mine)

China:

- Baishitouquan granite intrusion, Hami Prefecture, Xinjiang: found in granite

Libya:

- Jabal Eghei, Tibesti Mountains: found in granitic rocks

Mongolia:

- Avdar Massif, Töv Province: found in alkali granite

Ethiopia:

- Konso Zone

South Africa:

- Mogalakwena, Limpopo Province
- Khâi-Ma, Northern Cape
- Kakamas, Northern Cape
- Ceres Valley, Western Cape

Sweden:

- Skuleboda mine, Västra Götaland County: found in pegmatite

United States:

- Colorado:
  - Deer Trail, Arapahoe County^{:233}
  - Custer County^{:234}
  - Devils Head, Douglas County^{:234}
  - Pine Creek, Douglas County^{:234}
  - Crystal Park, El Paso County^{:234}
  - Pikes Peak, El Paso County: found in coarse granites or pegmatite
  - St. Peter's Dome, El Paso County^{:234}
  - Tarryall Mountains, Park County^{:235}
  - Crystal Peak, Teller County^{:235}
- Wyoming
- Virginia:
  - Morefield Mine, Amelia County: found in pegmatite
  - Rutherford Mine, Amelia County
- Pennsylvania:
  - Media, Delaware County^{:244}
  - Middletown, Delaware County^{:244}

== Color ==
For many years, the source of amazonite's color was a mystery. Some people assumed the color was due to copper because copper compounds often have blue and green colors. A 1985 study suggests that the blue-green color results from quantities of lead and water in the feldspar. Subsequent 1998 theoretical studies by A. Julg expand on the potential role of aliovalent lead in the color of microcline.

Other studies suggest the colors are associated with the increasing content of lead, rubidium, and thallium ranging in amounts between 0.00X and 0.0X in the feldspars, with even extremely high contents of PbO, lead monoxide, (1% or more) known from the literature. A 2010 study also implicated the role of divalent iron in the green coloration. These studies and associated hypotheses indicate the complex nature of the color in amazonite; in other words, the color may be the aggregate effect of several mutually inclusive and necessary factors.

== Health ==
A 2021 study by the German Institut für Edelsteinprüfung (EPI) found that the amount of lead ions that leaked from an 11 g (0.39 oz) sample of amazonite into an acidic solution simulating saliva exceeded European Union standard DIN EN 71-3:2013's recommended amount by five times. This experiment was to simulate a child swallowing amazonite, and could also apply to "crystal healing" practices such as inserting the mineral into drinking water bottles.

== Gallery ==
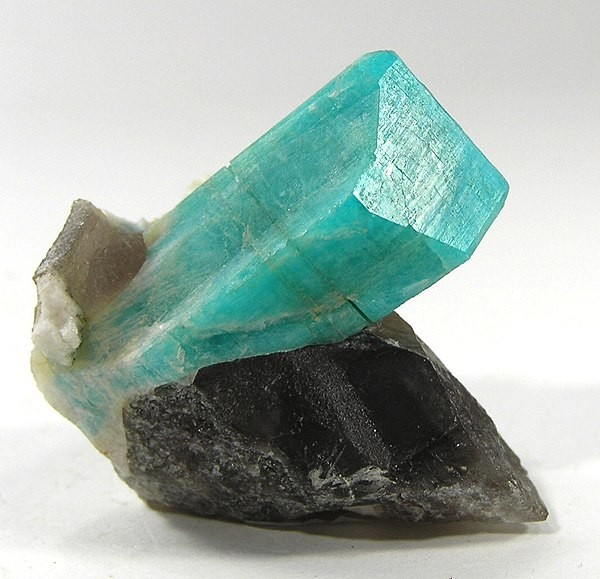
Deep robins-egg blue color amazonite crystal on smoky quartz and albite, from Teller County, Colorado. Size: 3.4 cm × 3.3 cm × 2.5 cm (1.3 in × 1.3 in × 1.0 in).

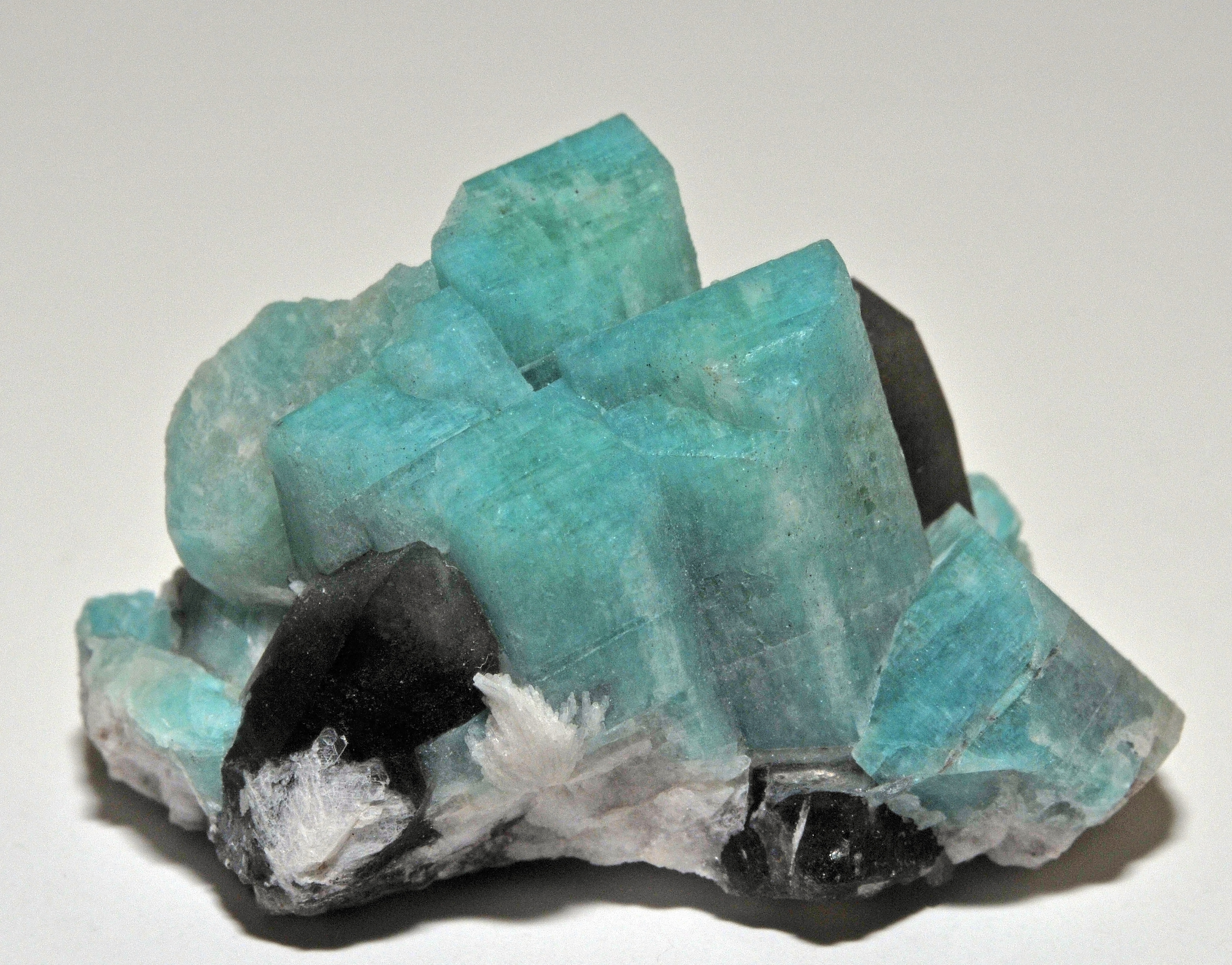
Amazonite crystal on smoky quartz, from Pikes Peak, El Paso County, Colorado

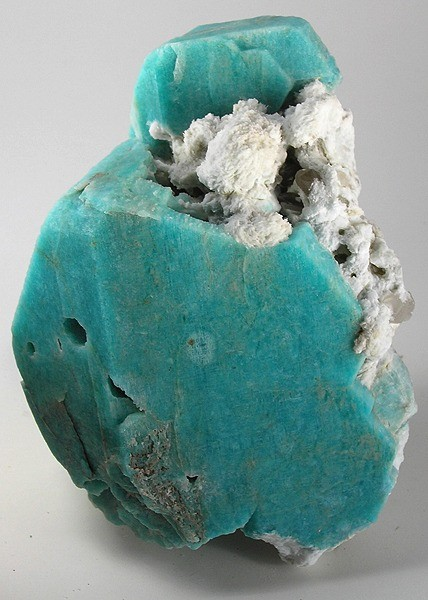
Large deep-turquoise amazonite crystal with attached stark-white microcline, from Konso, SNNPR, Ethiopia. Size: 16.4 cm × 11.9 cm × 8.0 cm (6.5 in × 4.7 in × 3.1 in).

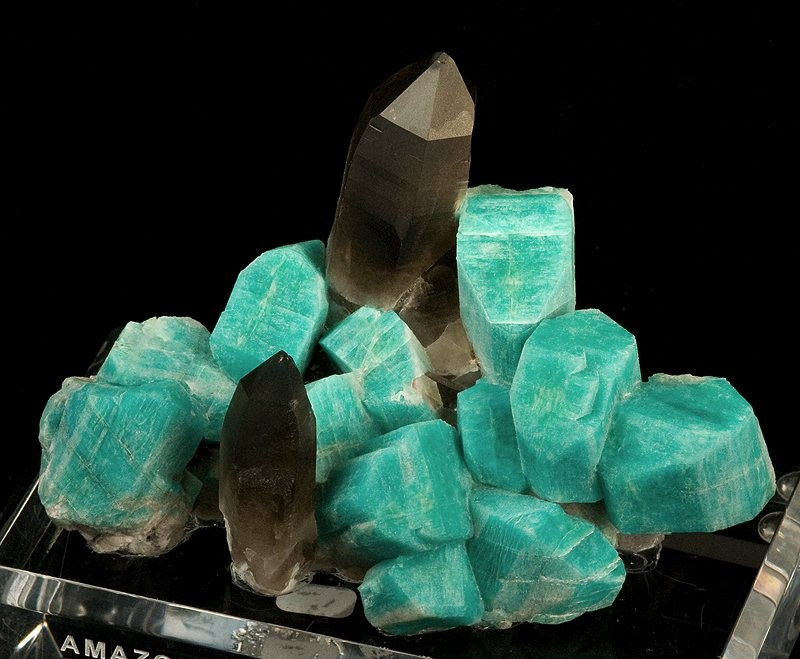
Two smoky quartz crystals surrounded by amazonite crystals, from Smoky Hawk Mine, Crystal Peak, Teller County, Colorado. Size: 11.0 cm × 8.2 cm × 6.3 cm (4.3 in × 3.2 in × 2.5 in).

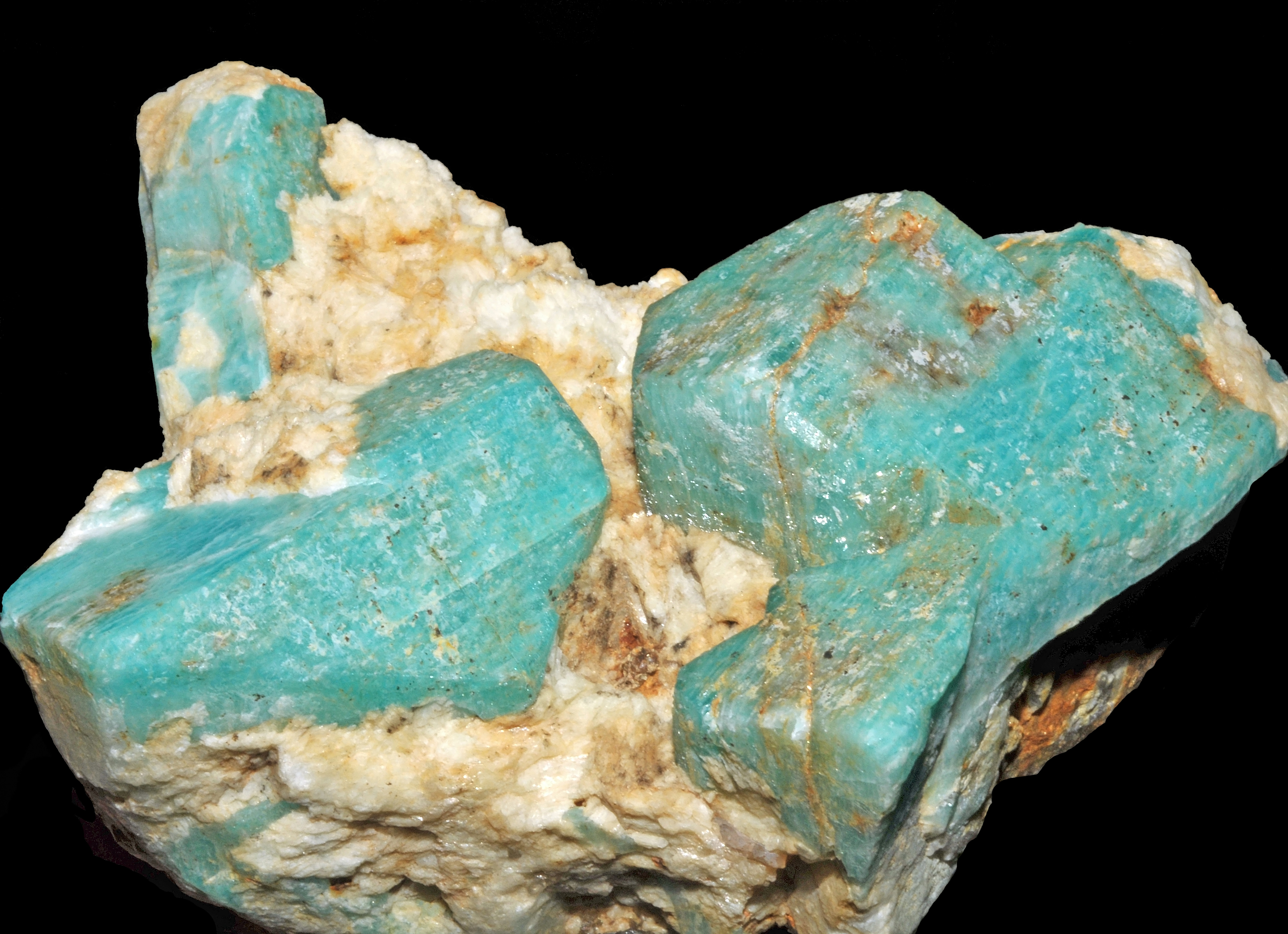
Amazonite crystals on orthoclase, from Konso, SNNPR, Ethiopia.

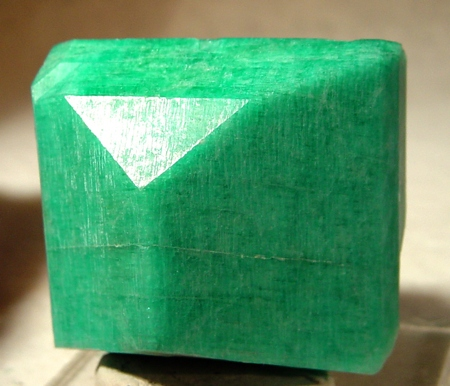
Deep lustrous crystal of amazonite, from Take 5 Claim, Crystal Peak, Teller County, Colorado. Size: 4.4 cm × 4.0 cm × 3.5 cm (1.7 in × 1.6 in × 1.4 in).

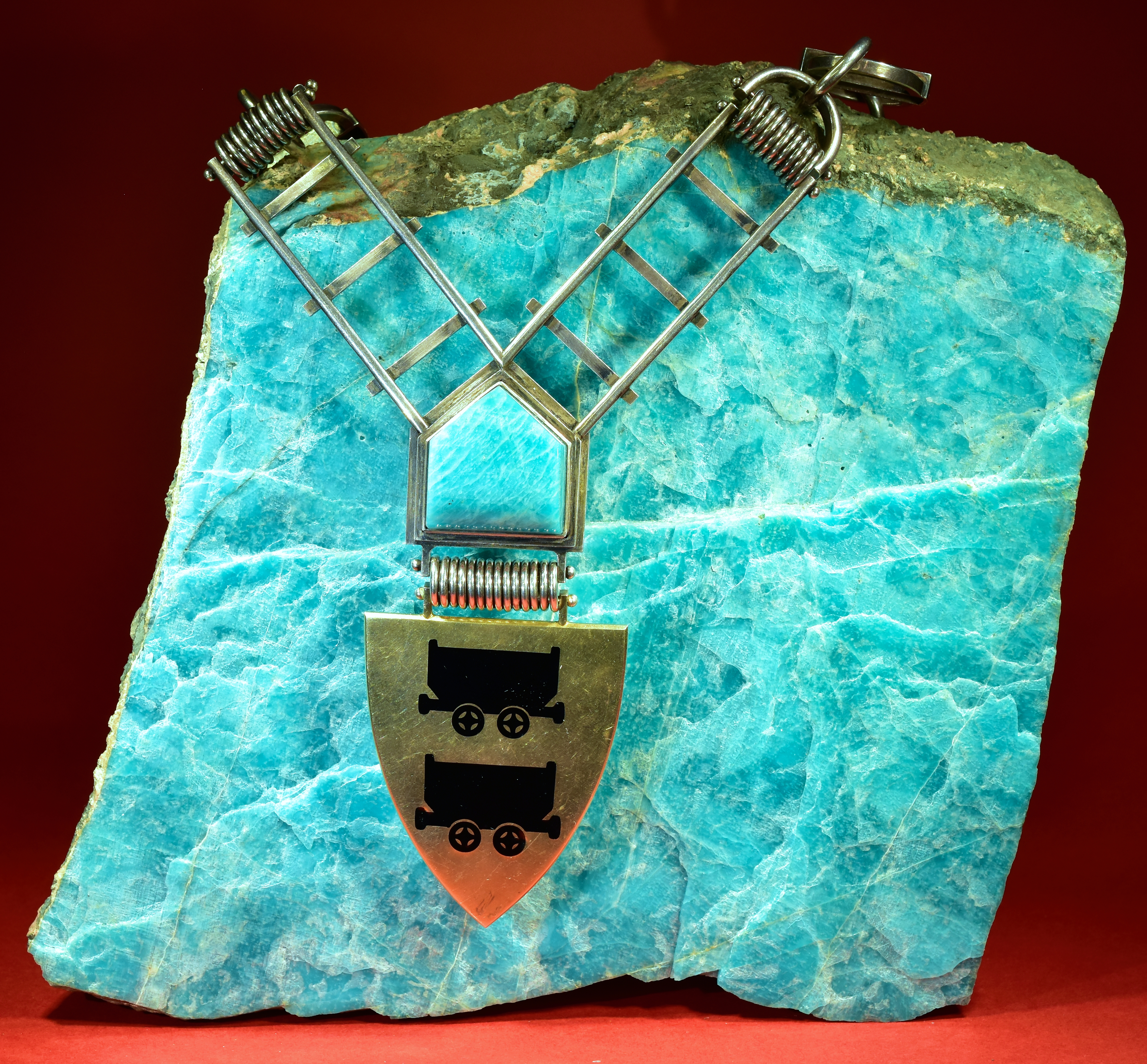
Amazonite from the Landsverk 1 mine with the livery collar of the mayor of Evje og Hornnes Municipality, Norway. Size: 21 cm × 22 cm (8.3 in × 8.7 in).

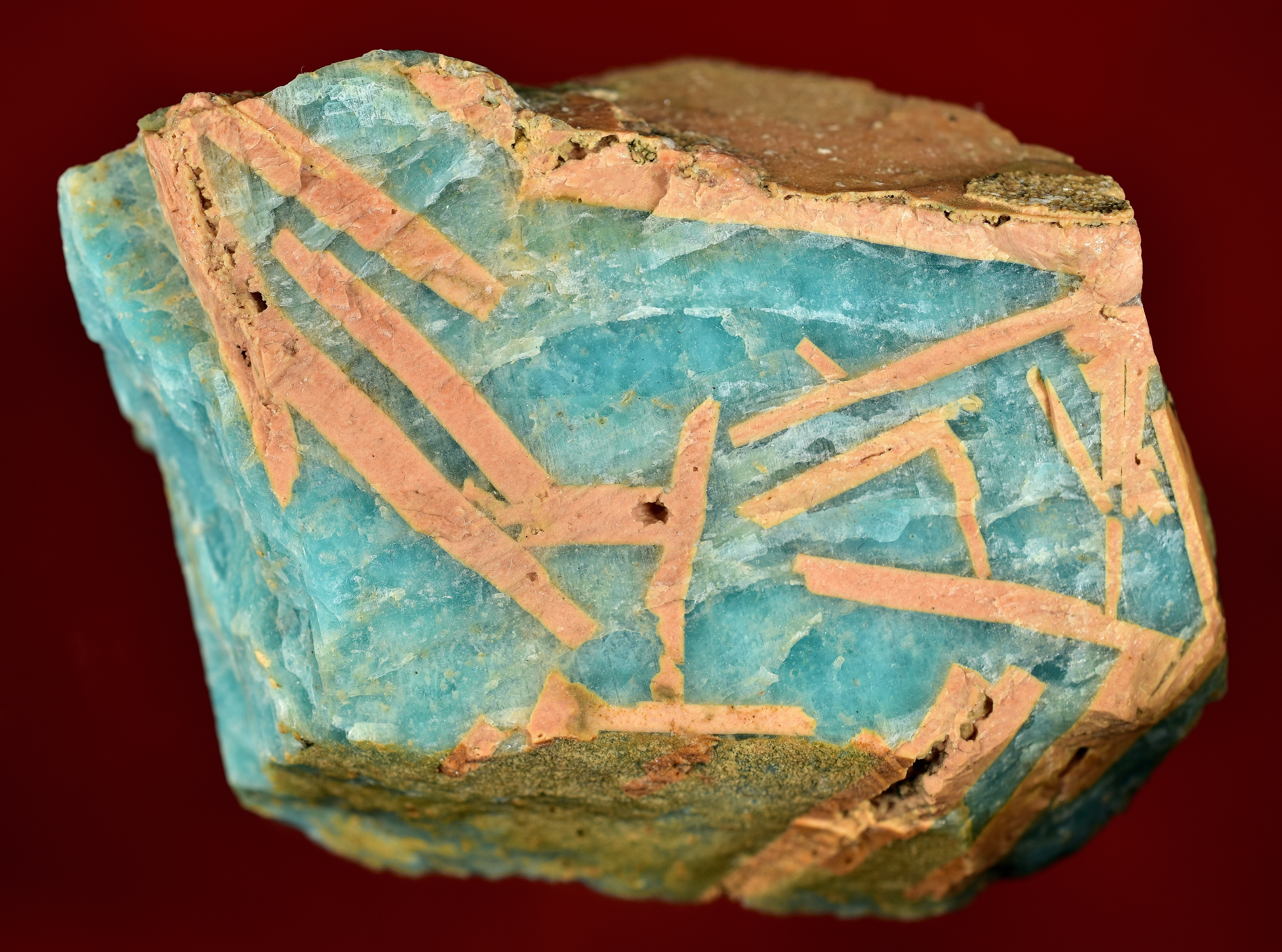
Amazonite partly altered to brown microcline from the Landsverk 1 mine in Evje, Norway.

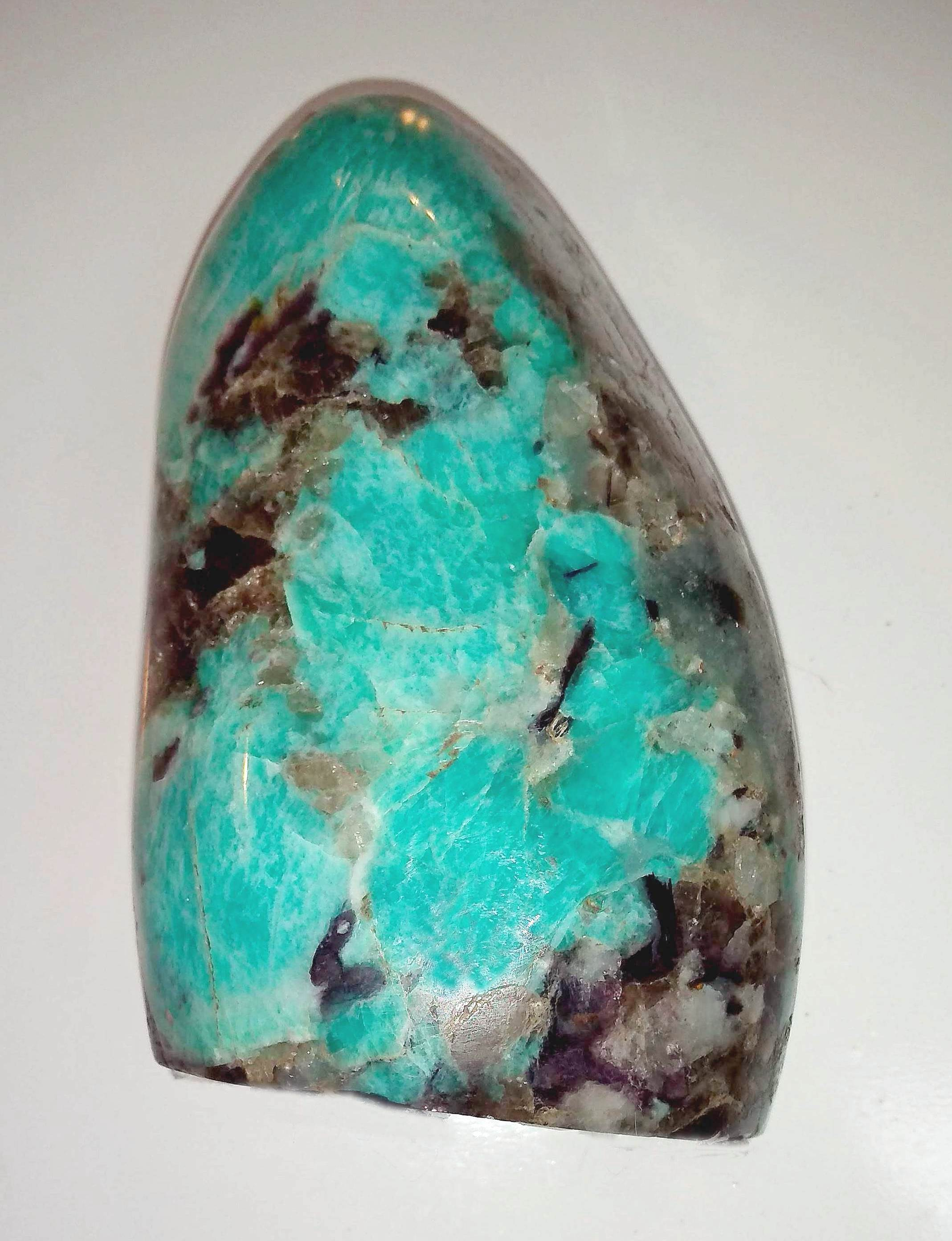
Polished Amazonite specimen. Height 13 cm (5 in).
