= Pikes Peak granite =

Geological formation in Colorado, United States

Pikes Peak Granite
- Stratigraphic range: Late-Precambrian, around 1080 Ma
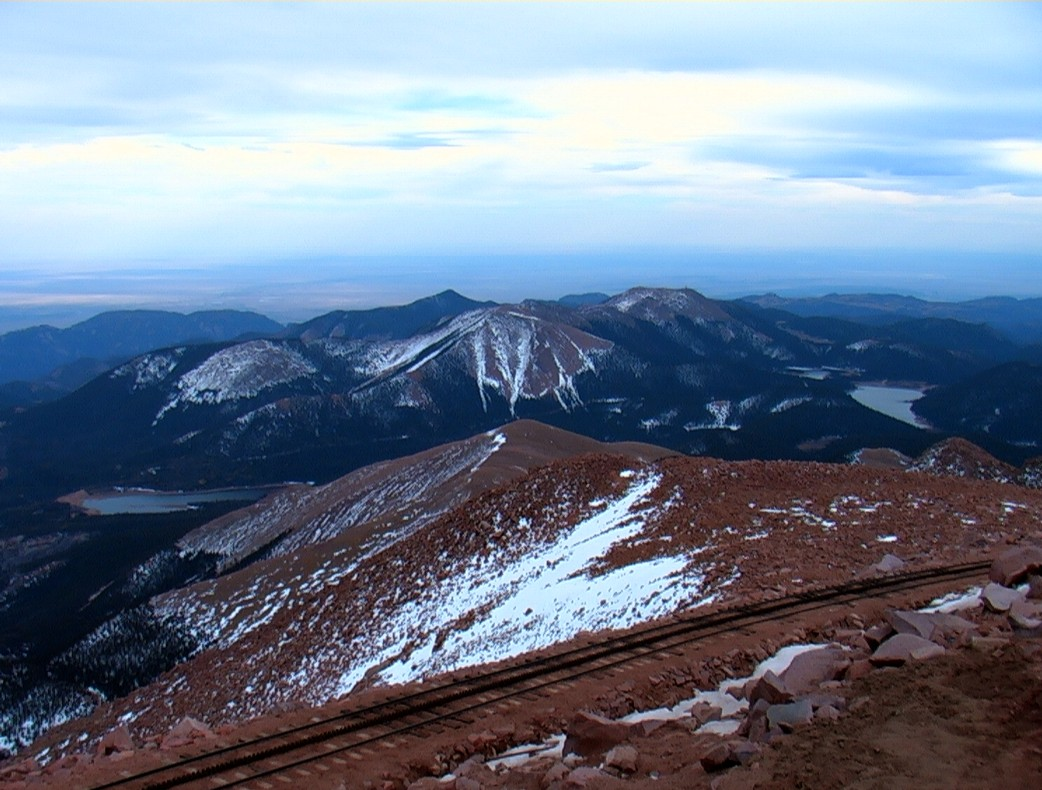
- Pikes Peak Granite is clearly exposed at the summit of Pikes Peak and its redness is visible in closer views.
- Type: Batholith
- Unit of: Pikes Peak batholith
- Sub-units: Major intrusive centers: Pikes Peak; Buffalo Park; Lost Creek
- Underlies: Limited remnants of overlying Permian and later sediments

Lithology
- Primary: Granite: Feldspar; Quartz; Hornblende; Biotite mica
- Other: Pegmatites of the above minerals with: Smoky quartz; Topaz; Amazonite

Location
- Coordinates: 38.8405322°N 105.0442048°W
- Country: United States

Type section
- Named for: Pikes Peak
- Pikes Peak granite (the United States) Pikes Peak granite (Colorado)

Pikes Peak granite is a 1.08 billion year old Late-Precambrian geologic formation found in the central part of the Front Range of Colorado. It is a coarse-grained pink to light red syenogranite with minor gray monzogranite, and it has a distinctive brick-red appearance where it outcrops.

The granite is named after the 14,115-foot (4,302 m) mountain called Pikes Peak, which is made up almost entirely of Pikes Peak granite.

== History ==
=== Origins ===
The Pikes Peak granite was emplaced in Colorado's central Front Range from three major intrusive centers near what is now Pikes Peak, Buffalo Park and the Lost Creek Wilderness. It is the geochemically potassic series of plutons compromising most of the Pikes Peak batholith, a batholith formed of two major types of plutons, the potassic Pikes Peak granite and later plutons, plus late stage sodic syenite and granite plutons.

Both the batholith and the Pikes Peak granite are A-type, meaning granites that originate in anorogenic, or non-mountain building, tectonic settings, with an alkaline geochemistry and arising from more anhydrous magmas.

== Geology ==
=== Erosion ===
About 300 million years later the cooled granite, gradually was exposed through erosion of the overlying rocks. Around 700 million years ago, the granite was exposed at the surface and, for another 300 million years, it was subject to extensive weathering.

Since no sediments were being deposited, there is a large time gap in the geological record. This gap is part of a more generalized gap called the Great Unconformity.

=== Deposition ===
About 510 million years ago, the granite mountains had largely worn away, and the area was again subject to tectonic subsidence and deposition and was gradually buried by thick layers of sediment. Over the next 450 million years, the area was covered by seas, reefs, beaches, sand dunes, and mountain streams from the west, all of together which laid down more than 15,000 feet (4,500 m) of sediment.

About 60 million years ago, parts of the Western U.S. were subjected to a series of uplifts, known as the Laramide orogeny, that eventually formed the Rocky Mountains and raised Pikes Peak to its current height.

Pikes Peak, like other portions of Colorado Rockies is still being uplifted as a part of larger tectonic processes affecting the Western United States.

== Pikes Peak Batholith ==
=== Batholith ===
The Pikes Peak Batholith and Granite is exposed over a large part of the central Front Range of Colorado. It is found as far north as the southern slopes of Mount Blue Sky west of Denver, west of South Park, and as far south as Cañon City. The batholith measures about 80 miles (130 km) long in the north-south direction and about 25 miles (40 km) wide east to west. Most of the batholith remains underground. Geologists have found the granite at the bottom of deep wells on the plains and magnetic sensors have detected it at around 80 miles (130 km) to the east.

== Mineralogy ==
=== Color and structure ===
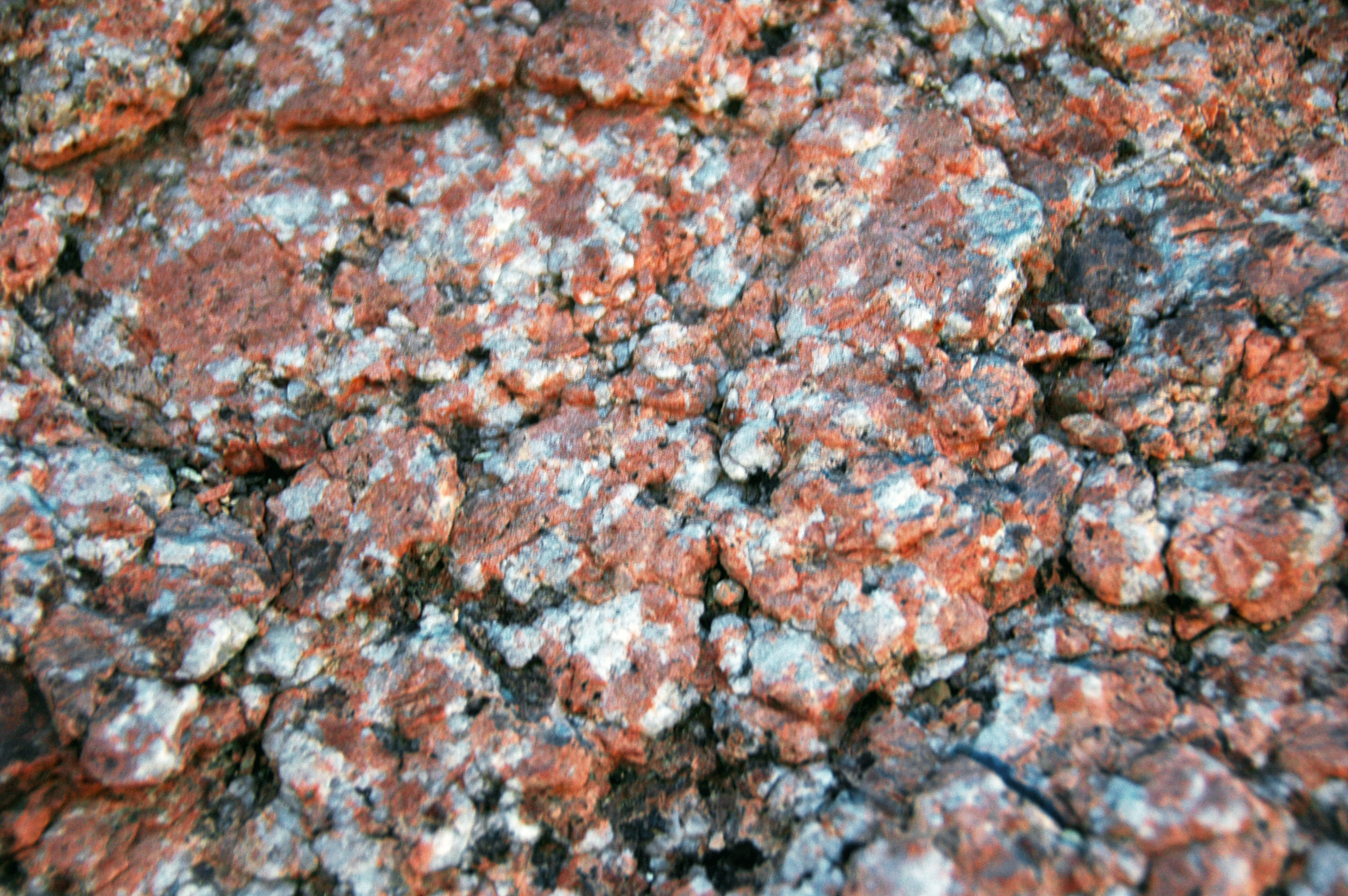
Crystalline structures and colors of Pikes Peak granite

In mineralogy, Pikes Peak granite ranges from light pink to almost red. The color of pink is due to large amounts of the igneous rock-forming mineral microcline feldspar, and several iron minerals, that are abundant in the rock.

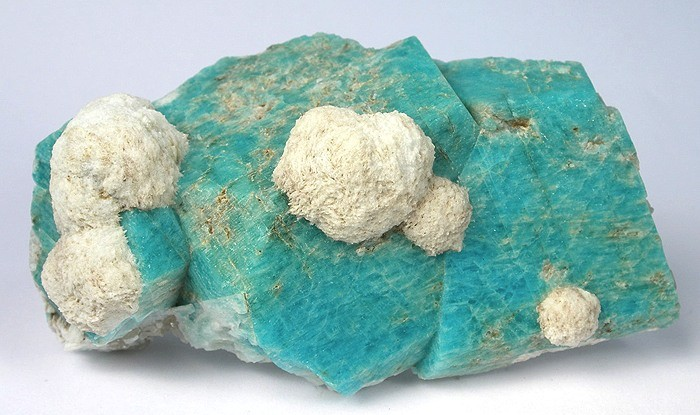
Microcline feldspar variety Amazonite with bladed balls of white feldspar outside of the state of Colorado

=== Crystallization ===
The cooling of ancient magma caused crystals to form, through the process of precipitation and spread out of the magma. Pikes Peak granite is notably very coarse-grained on average, and made up almost entirely of large crystals of feldspar, and about a centimeter across, the granite can be easily weathered and crumbles. On average, hills and slopes of the Pikes Peak region are covered with thick blankets of loose gravel (scree) made up of marble-sized grains of feldspar.

In some places, the cooling process lasted long enough to form pegmatites that contain large, pure crystals of various minerals. The chemistry of the cooling magma produced a complex mineralogy that collectors come from around the world for Pikes Peaks mineral specimens. Smoky quartz crystals and topaz are found in many places in the Pikes Peak granite. The most well-known mineral from the area is amazonite, a bluish form of microcline feldspar that is relatively rare in other parts of the world. Many museum collections have specimens of deep blue amazonite crystals studded with jet-black smoky quartz crystals.

== See also ==
- Cheyenne Mountain
- Colorado Springs
- Feldspar
- Granite
- Pikes Peak
