= Devils Head (summit) =

Mountain in Colorado, United States

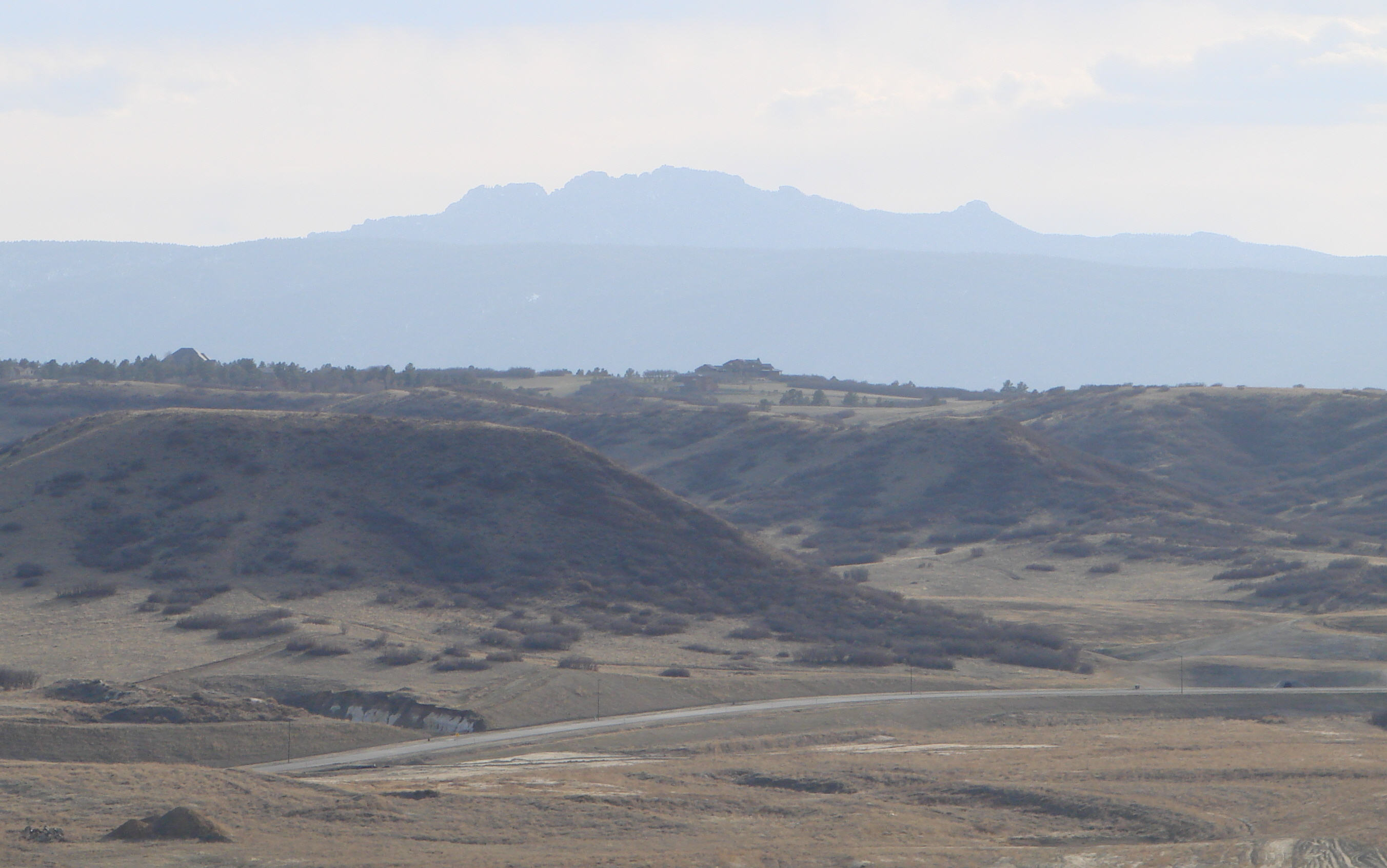
- View of Devils Head from Castle Rock, Colorado

Highest point
- Elevation: 9,749 ft (2,971 m)
- Prominence: 1,248 ft (380 m)
- Isolation: 7.99 mi (12.86 km)
- Coordinates: 39°15′37″N 105°06′05″W

Geography
- Location within Colorado
- Location: Douglas County, Colorado, U.S.
- Parent range: Front Range, Rampart Range
- Topo map(s): USGS 7.5' topographic map Devils Head, Colorado

Climbing
- Easiest route: Devil's Head Trailhead #611(Devil's Head National Recreation Trail)

Devils Head is a mountain summit in the Rampart Range of the Rocky Mountains of Colorado. The 9,749-foot (2,971 m) peak is located in Pike National Forest, 14.2 miles (22.9 km) southwest by south (bearing 210°) of the community of Sedalia in Douglas County, Colorado, United States.

== Mountain ==
Devils Head is topped by the Devil's Head Lookout, an active United States Forest Service fire lookout tower. Access to the summit and lookout tower is via the Devils Head National Recreation Trail.

Devils Head name comes from prospectors of the late 1800s. From the southwest of Devils Head, and looking northeast toward the mountain, one can see a shape of a face laying flat, as if the mountain was looking up. Some of the forest has softened the looks, as there used to be a more obvious eye socket, and facial features. However, from this angle, one is still able to see the face and even horns.

== Historical names ==
- The Sleeping Indian
- Camels Back
- Devils Head – 1923
- Platte Mountain
- Warrens Crag

== See also ==
- List of Colorado mountain ranges
- List of Colorado mountain summits
  - List of Colorado fourteeners
  - List of Colorado 4000 meter prominent summits
  - List of the most prominent summits of Colorado
- List of Colorado county high points
