= List of mountain peaks of Colorado =

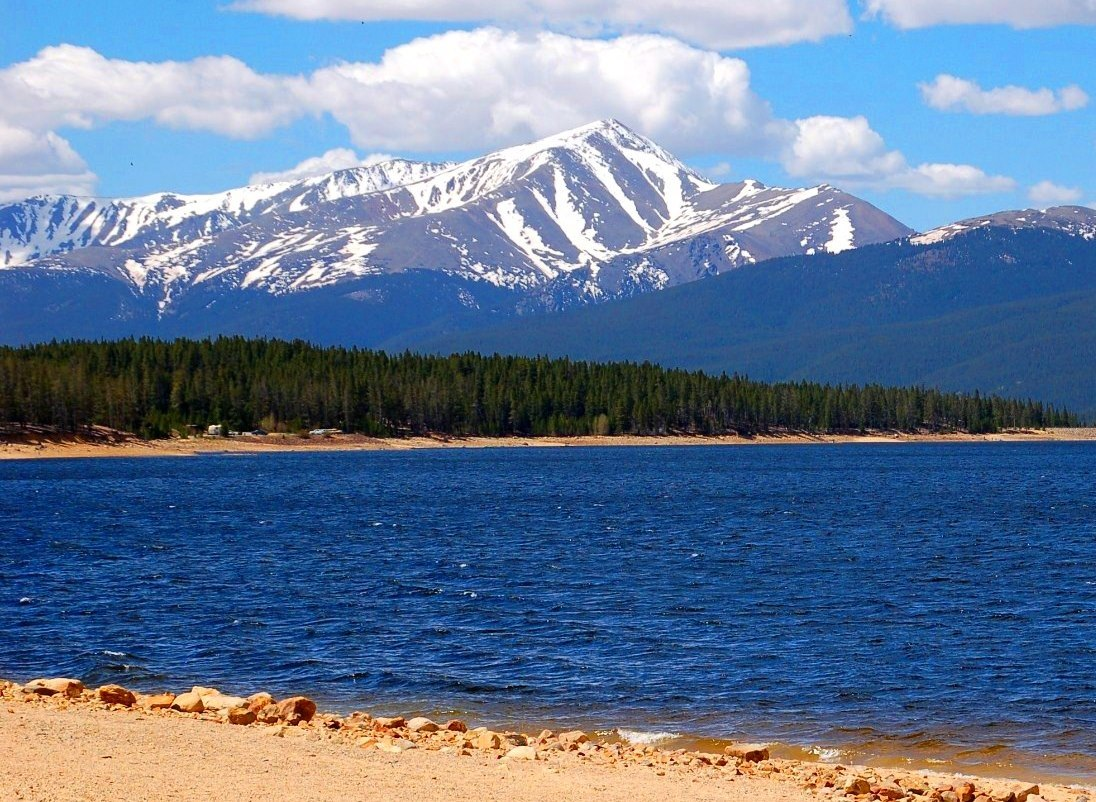
Mount Elbert in the Sawatch Range is the highest peak of the Rocky Mountains and the highest point in the U.S. State of Colorado.

This is a list of major mountain peaks in the U.S. State of Colorado.

This article comprises three sortable tables of major mountain peaks (Note: This article defines a significant summit as a summit with at least 100 meters (328.1 feet) of topographic prominence, and a major summit as a summit with at least 500 meters (1640 feet) of topographic prominence. All summits in this article have at least 500 meters of topographic prominence. An ultra-prominent summit is a summit with at least 1500 meters (4921 feet) of topographic prominence.) in Colorado.

The summit of a mountain or hill may be measured in three principal ways:

1. The topographic elevation of a summit measures the height of the summit above a geodetic sea level. (Note: All elevations in this article include an elevation adjustment from the National Geodetic Vertical Datum of 1929 (NGVD 29) to the North American Vertical Datum of 1988 (NAVD 88). For further information, please see this United States National Geodetic Survey note.) (Note: If the elevation or prominence of a summit is calculated as a range of values, the arithmetic mean is shown.) The first table below ranks the 55 highest major summits of Colorado by elevation.
2. The topographic prominence of a summit is a measure of how high the summit rises above its surroundings. (Note: The topographic prominence of a summit is the topographic elevation difference between the summit and its highest or key col to a higher summit. The summit may be near its key col or quite far away. The key col for Denali in Alaska is the Isthmus of Rivas in Nicaragua, 7642 kilometers (4749 miles) away.) The second table below ranks the 50 most prominent summits of Colorado.
3. The topographic isolation (or radius of dominance) of a summit measures how far the summit lies from its nearest point of equal elevation. (Note: The topographic isolation of a summit is the great-circle distance to its nearest point of equal elevation.) The third table below ranks the 50 most isolated major summits of Colorado.

== Highest major summits ==
Of the highest major summits of Colorado, the following 63 peaks exceed 4000 meters (13,123 feet) elevation (Note: This list of the 55 major 4000-meter summits of Colorado includes 30 peaks with more than 500 meters of topographic prominence but less than 4267 meters in elevation: Grizzly Peak, Mount Ouray, Vermilion Peak, Mount Silverheels, Rio Grande Pyramid, Bald Mountain, Mount Oso, Mount Jackson, Bard Peak, West Spanish Peak, Mount Powell, Hagues Peak, Tower Mountain, Treasure Mountain, North Arapaho Peak, Parry Peak, Bill Williams Peak, Sultan Mountain, Mount Herard, West Buffalo Peak, Summit Peak, Middle Peak, Antora Peak, Henry Mountain, Hesperus Mountain, Jacque Peak, Bennett Peak, Conejos Peak, Twilight Peak, and South River Peak. The list of the 53 Colorado fourteeners includes 28 peaks with over 14,000 feet of elevation but less than 1640 feet of topographic prominence: Torreys Peak, Quandary Peak, Mount Shavano, Mount Belford, Crestone Needle, Mount Bross, Kit Carson Mountain, Tabeguache Peak, Mount Oxford, Mount Democrat, Snowmass Mountain, Windom Peak, Challenger Point, Mount Columbia, Missouri Mountain, Humboldt Peak, Mount Bierstadt, Sunlight Peak, Ellingwood Point, Mount Lindsey, Little Bear Peak, Mount Sherman, Redcloud Peak, Pyramid Peak, Wilson Peak, Wetterhorn Peak, Huron Peak, and Sunshine Peak. The first 25 summits on this list are included on both lists: Mount Elbert, Mount Massive, Mount Harvard, Blanca Peak, La Plata Peak, Uncompahgre Peak, Crestone Peak, Mount Lincoln, Castle Peak, Grays Peak, Mount Antero, Mount Evans, Longs Peak, Mount Wilson, Mount Princeton, Mount Yale, Maroon Peak, Mount Sneffels, Capitol Peak, Pikes Peak, Mount Eolus, Handies Peak, Culebra Peak, San Luis Peak, and Mount of the Holy Cross.) and 117 peaks exceed 3000 meters (9843 feet) elevation.

The 55 Colorado summits with at least 4000 meters of topographic elevation and at least 500 meters of topographic prominence
Rank	Mountain Peak	Mountain Range	Elevation	Prominence	Isolation	Location
1	Mount Elbert (Note: The summit of Mount Elbert is the highest point of the U.S. State of Colorado, the Rocky Mountains of North America, and the entire Mississippi River drainage basin.)	Sawatch Range	14,440 ft 4401.2 m	9,093 ft 2772 m	671 mi 1,079 km	39.1178°N 106.4454°W
2	Mount Massive (Note: Mount Massive is the second highest summit of the Rocky Mountains.) (Note: The elevation of Mount Massive includes an adjustment of +2.087 m (6.85 ft) from NGVD 29 to NAVD 88.)	Sawatch Range	14,424 ft 4396.3 m	1,978 ft 603 m	5.1 mi 8.21 km	39.1875°N 106.4757°W
3	Mount Harvard (Note: The summit of Mount Harvard is the highest point of the Collegiate Peaks.) (Note: Mount Harvard is the southernmost and easternmost summit of its elevation in the Rocky Mountains.)	Sawatch Range	14,421 ft 4395.6 m	2,360 ft 719 m	14.92 mi 24 km	38.9244°N 106.3207°W
4	Blanca Peak (Note: The summit of Blanca Peak is the highest point of the Sangre de Cristo Mountains and the entire Rio Grande (Rio Bravo del Norte) drainage basin.) (Note: Blanca Peak is the southernmost ultra-prominent summit of the Rocky Mountains.) (Note: The elevation of Blanca Peak includes an adjustment of +1.755 m (5.76 ft) from NGVD 29 to NAVD 88.)	Sangre de Cristo Mountains	14,351 ft 4374 m	5,326 ft 1623 m	103.4 mi 166.4 km	37.5775°N 105.4856°W
5	La Plata Peak (Note: The elevation of La Plata Peak includes an adjustment of +1.983 m (6.51 ft) from NGVD 29 to NAVD 88.)	Sawatch Range	14,343 ft 4372 m	1,836 ft 560 m	6.28 mi 10.11 km	39.0294°N 106.4729°W
6	Uncompahgre Peak (Note: The summit of Uncompahgre Peak is the highest point of the San Juan Mountains and the entire Gulf of California drainage basin.) (Note: Uncompahgre Peak is the westernmost summit of its elevation in the Rocky Mountains.)	San Juan Mountains	14,321 ft 4365 m	4,277 ft 1304 m	85 mi 136.8 km	38.0717°N 107.4621°W
7	Crestone Peak (Note: The summit of Crestone Peak is the highest point of the Crestones.) (Note: The elevation of Crestone Peak includes an adjustment of +1.76 m (5.77 ft) from NGVD 29 to NAVD 88.)	Sangre de Cristo Range	14,300 ft 4359 m	4,554 ft 1388 m	27.4 mi 44 km	37.9669°N 105.5855°W
8	Mount Lincoln (Note: The summit of Mount Lincoln is the highest point of the Mosquito Range and the entire Missouri River drainage basin.) (Note: Mount Lincoln is the northernmost summit of its elevation in the Rocky Mountains.)	Mosquito Range	14,293 ft 4356.5 m	3,862 ft 1177 m	22.5 mi 36.2 km	39.3515°N 106.1116°W
9	Castle Peak (Note: The summit of Castle Peak is the highest point of the Elk Mountains.)	Elk Mountains	14,279 ft 4352.2 m	2,365 ft 721 m	20.9 mi 33.6 km	39.0097°N 106.8614°W
10	Grays Peak (Note: The summit of Grays Peak is the highest point of the Front Range and the Continental Divide in North America.) (Note: Grays Peak is the northernmost summit of its elevation in the Rocky Mountains.)	Front Range	14,278 ft 4352 m	2,770 ft 844 m	25 mi 40.2 km	39.6339°N 105.8176°W
11	Mount Antero (Note: The summit of Mount Antero is the highest point of the southern Sawatch Range.)	Sawatch Range	14,276 ft 4351.4 m	2,503 ft 763 m	17.67 mi 28.4 km	38.6741°N 106.2462°W
12	Mount Blue Sky (Note: The summit elevation of Mount Blue Sky includes a vertical offset of +1.798 m (5.9 ft) from the station benchmark.)	Front Range	14,271 ft 4350 m	2,770 ft 844 m	9.79 mi 15.76 km	39.5883°N 105.6438°W
13	Longs Peak (Note: The summit of Longs Peak is the highest point of the northern Front Range.) (Note: Longs Peak is the northernmost 14,000-foot (4267-meter) summit of the Rocky Mountains.)	Front Range	14,259 ft 4346 m	2,940 ft 896 m	43.6 mi 70.2 km	40.2550°N 105.6151°W
14	Mount Wilson (Note: The summit of Mount Wilson is the highest point of the San Miguel Mountains.) (Note: Mount Wilson is the westernmost summit of its elevation in the Rocky Mountains.) (Note: The elevation of Mount Wilson includes an adjustment of +1.899 m (6.23 ft) from NGVD 29 to NAVD 88.)	San Miguel Mountains	14,252 ft 4344 m	4,024 ft 1227 m	33 mi 53.1 km	37.8391°N 107.9916°W
15	Mount Princeton	Sawatch Range	14,204 ft 4329.3 m	2,177 ft 664 m	5.19 mi 8.36 km	38.7492°N 106.2424°W
16	Mount Yale	Sawatch Range	14,200 ft 4328.2 m	1,896 ft 578 m	5.55 mi 8.93 km	38.8442°N 106.3138°W
17	Maroon Peak	Elk Mountains	14,163 ft 4317 m	2,336 ft 712 m	8.06 mi 12.97 km	39.0708°N 106.9890°W
18	Mount Sneffels (Note: The summit of Mount Sneffels is the highest point of the Sneffels Range.)	Sneffels Range	14,158 ft 4315.4 m	3,050 ft 930 m	15.71 mi 25.3 km	38.0038°N 107.7923°W
19	Capitol Peak (Note: The elevation of Capitol Peak includes an adjustment of +1.991 m (6.53 ft) from NGVD 29 to NAVD 88.)	Elk Mountains	14,137 ft 4309 m	1,750 ft 533 m	7.44 mi 11.98 km	39.1503°N 107.0829°W
20	Pikes Peak	Front Range	14,115 ft 4302.31 m	5,530 ft 1686 m	60.6 mi 97.6 km	38.8405°N 105.0442°W
21	Windom Peak (Note: The summit of Windom Peak is the highest point of the Needle Mountains.) (Note: Mount Eolus may be higher than Windom Peak.) (Note: The elevation of Windom Peak includes an adjustment of +1.785 m (5.86 ft) from NGVD 29 to NAVD 88.)	Needle Mountains	14,093 ft 4296 m	2,187 ft 667 m	26.3 mi 42.4 km	37.6212°N 107.5919°W
22	Handies Peak	San Juan Mountains	14,058 ft 4284.8 m	1,908 ft 582 m	11.18 mi 18 km	37.9130°N 107.5044°W
23	Culebra Peak (Note: The summit of Culebra Peak is the highest point of the Culebra Range.) (Note: Culebra Peak is the southernmost 14,000-foot (4267-meter) summit of the Rocky Mountains.) (Note: The elevation of Culebra Peak includes an adjustment of +1.74 m (5.71 ft) from NGVD 29 to NAVD 88.)	Culebra Range	14,053 ft 4283 m	4,827 ft 1471 m	35.4 mi 56.9 km	37.1224°N 105.1858°W
24	San Luis Peak	San Juan Mountains	14,022 ft 4273.8 m	3,113 ft 949 m	26.9 mi 43.4 km	37.9868°N 106.9313°W
25	Mount of the Holy Cross (Note: The summit of Mount of the Holy Cross is the highest point of the northern Sawatch Range.) (Note: The summit elevation of Mount of the Holy Cross includes a vertical offset of +0.61 m (2 ft) from the station benchmark.)	Sawatch Range	14,011 ft 4270.5 m	2,113 ft 644 m	18.41 mi 29.6 km	39.4668°N 106.4817°W
26	Grizzly Peak (Note: Grizzly Peak lies on the Continental Divide of the Americas.)	Sawatch Range	13,995 ft 4265.6 m	1,928 ft 588 m	6.77 mi 10.89 km	39.0425°N 106.5976°W
27	Mount Ouray (Note: The summit of Mount Ouray is the highest point of the far southern Sawatch Range.)	Sawatch Range	13,961 ft 4255.4 m	2,659 ft 810 m	13.58 mi 21.9 km	38.4227°N 106.2247°W
28	Vermilion Peak (Note: The elevation of Vermilion Peak includes an adjustment of +1.827 m (5.99 ft) from NGVD 29 to NAVD 88.)	San Juan Mountains	13,900 ft 4237 m	2,105 ft 642 m	9.07 mi 14.6 km	37.7993°N 107.8285°W
29	Mount Silverheels	Front Range	13,829 ft 4215 m	2,283 ft 696 m	5.48 mi 8.82 km	39.3394°N 106.0054°W
30	Rio Grande Pyramid	San Juan Mountains	13,827 ft 4214.4 m	1,881 ft 573 m	10.76 mi 17.31 km	37.6797°N 107.3924°W
31	Bald Mountain (Note: The elevation of Bald Mountain includes an adjustment of +1.922 m (6.31 ft) from NGVD 29 to NAVD 88.)	Front Range	13,690 ft 4173 m	2,099 ft 640 m	7.51 mi 12.09 km	39.4448°N 105.9705°W
32	Mount Oso (Note: The elevation of Mount Oso includes an adjustment of +1.776 m (5.83 ft) from NGVD 29 to NAVD 88.)	San Juan Mountains	13,690 ft 4173 m	1,664 ft 507 m	5.41 mi 8.71 km	37.6070°N 107.4936°W
33	Mount Jackson	Sawatch Range	13,676 ft 4168.5 m	1,810 ft 552 m	3.21 mi 5.16 km	39.4853°N 106.5367°W
34	Bard Peak (Note: The elevation of Bard Peak includes an adjustment of +1.707 m (5.6 ft) from NGVD 29 to NAVD 88.)	Front Range	13,647 ft 4159 m	1,701 ft 518 m	5.43 mi 8.74 km	39.7204°N 105.8044°W
35	West Spanish Peak (Note: The elevation of West Spanish Peak includes an adjustment of +1.468 m (4.82 ft) from NGVD 29 to NAVD 88.)	Spanish Peaks	13,631 ft 4155 m	3,686 ft 1123 m	19.87 mi 32 km	37.3756°N 104.9934°W
36	Mount Powell (Note: The summit of Mount Powell is the highest point of the Gore Range.) (Note: The elevation of Mount Powell includes an adjustment of +1.771 m (5.81 ft) from NGVD 29 to NAVD 88.)	Gore Range	13,586 ft 4141 m	3,000 ft 914 m	21.5 mi 34.6 km	39.7601°N 106.3407°W
37	Hagues Peak (Note: The summit of Hagues Peak is the highest point of the Mummy Range.)	Mummy Range	13,573 ft 4137 m	2,420 ft 738 m	15.7 mi 25.3 km	40.4845°N 105.6464°W
38	Tower Mountain (Note: The elevation of Tower Mountain includes an adjustment of +1.796 m (5.89 ft) from NGVD 29 to NAVD 88.)	San Juan Mountains	13,558 ft 4132 m	1,652 ft 504 m	4.88 mi 7.86 km	37.8573°N 107.6230°W
39	Treasure Mountain (Note: The elevation of Treasure Mountain includes an adjustment of +2.008 m (6.59 ft) from NGVD 29 to NAVD 88.)	Elk Mountains	13,535 ft 4125 m	2,828 ft 862 m	6.92 mi 11.13 km	39.0244°N 107.1228°W
40	North Arapaho Peak (Note: The summit of North Arapaho Peak is the highest point of the Indian Peaks.) (Note: The elevation of North Arapaho Peak includes an adjustment of +1.763 m (5.78 ft) from NGVD 29 to NAVD 88.)	Front Range	13,508 ft 4117 m	1,665 ft 507 m	15.38 mi 24.8 km	40.0265°N 105.6504°W
41	Parry Peak (Note: The elevation of Parry Peak includes an adjustment of +1.763 m (5.78 ft) from NGVD 29 to NAVD 88.)	Front Range	13,397 ft 4083 m	1,720 ft 524 m	9.46 mi 15.22 km	39.8381°N 105.7132°W
42	Bill Williams Peak (Note: The summit of Bill Williams Peak is the highest point of the Williams Mountains.) (Note: The elevation of Bill Williams Peak includes an adjustment of +2.044 m (6.71 ft) from NGVD 29 to NAVD 88.)	Williams Mountains	13,389 ft 4081 m	1,682 ft 513 m	3.72 mi 5.98 km	39.1806°N 106.6102°W
43	Sultan Mountain (Note: The elevation of Sultan Mountain includes an adjustment of +1.649 m (5.41 ft) from NGVD 29 to NAVD 88.)	San Juan Mountains	13,373 ft 4076 m	1,868 ft 569 m	4.59 mi 7.39 km	37.7859°N 107.7038°W
44	Mount Herard (Note: The elevation of Mount Herard includes an adjustment of +1.64 m (5.38 ft) from NGVD 29 to NAVD 88.)	Sangre de Cristo Mountains	13,345 ft 4068 m	2,040 ft 622 m	4.63 mi 7.45 km	37.8492°N 105.4949°W
45	West Buffalo Peak (Note: The elevation of West Buffalo Peak includes an adjustment of +1.834 m (6.02 ft) from NGVD 29 to NAVD 88.)	Mosquito Range	13,332 ft 4064 m	1,986 ft 605 m	9.61 mi 15.46 km	38.9917°N 106.1249°W
46	Summit Peak (Note: The summit of Summit Peak is the highest point of the southern San Juan Mountains.)	San Juan Mountains	13,308 ft 4056.2 m	2,760 ft 841 m	39.6 mi 63.7 km	37.3506°N 106.6968°W
47	Middle Peak (Note: Dolores Peak may be higher than Middle Peak.) (Note: The elevation of Middle Peak includes an adjustment of +1.809 m (5.94 ft) from NGVD 29 to NAVD 88.)	San Miguel Mountains	13,306 ft 4056 m	1,960 ft 597 m	4.78 mi 7.69 km	37.8536°N 108.1082°W
48	Antora Peak (Note: The elevation of Antora Peak includes an adjustment of +1.883 m (6.18 ft) from NGVD 29 to NAVD 88.)	Sawatch Range	13,275 ft 4046 m	2,409 ft 734 m	6.75 mi 10.86 km	38.3250°N 106.2180°W
49	Henry Mountain (Note: The elevation of Henry Mountain includes an adjustment of +2.037 m (6.68 ft) from NGVD 29 to NAVD 88.)	Sawatch Range	13,261 ft 4042 m	1,674 ft 510 m	10.94 mi 17.61 km	38.6856°N 106.6211°W
50	Hesperus Mountain (Note: The summit of Hesperus Mountain is the highest point of the La Plata Mountains.) (Note: The elevation of Hesperus Mountain includes an adjustment of +1.65 m (5.41 ft) from NGVD 29 to NAVD 88.)	La Plata Mountains	13,237 ft 4035 m	2,852 ft 869 m	24.5 mi 39.5 km	37.4451°N 108.0890°W
51	Jacque Peak (Note: The elevation of Jacque Peak includes an adjustment of +1.866 m (6.12 ft) from NGVD 29 to NAVD 88.)	Gore Range	13,211 ft 4027 m	2,065 ft 629 m	4.52 mi 7.28 km	39.4549°N 106.1970°W
52	Bennett Peak (Note: The elevation of Bennett Peak includes an adjustment of +1.782 m (5.85 ft) from NGVD 29 to NAVD 88.)	San Juan Mountains	13,209 ft 4026 m	1,743 ft 531 m	17.08 mi 27.5 km	37.4833°N 106.4343°W
53	Conejos Peak	San Juan Mountains	13,179 ft 4017 m	1,912 ft 583 m	8.15 mi 13.12 km	37.2887°N 106.5709°W
54	Twilight Peak (Note: The summit of Twilight Peak is the highest point of the West Needle Mountains.) (Note: The elevation of Twilight Peak includes an adjustment of +1.537 m (5.04 ft) from NGVD 29 to NAVD 88.)	Needle Mountains	13,163 ft 4012 m	2,338 ft 713 m	4.88 mi 7.86 km	37.6630°N 107.7270°W
55	South River Peak	San Juan Mountains	13,154 ft 4009.4 m	2,448 ft 746 m	21.1 mi 34 km	37.5741°N 106.9815°W

== Most prominent summits ==
Of the most prominent summits of Colorado, only Mount Elbert exceeds 2000 meters (6562 feet) of topographic prominence. Three peaks are ultra-prominent summits with more than 1500 meters (4921 feet) of topographic prominence and 14 peaks exceed 1000 meters (3281 feet) of topographic prominence.

The 50 most topographically prominent summits of Colorado
Rank	Mountain peak	Mountain range	Elevation	Prominence	Isolation	Location
1	Mount Elbert	Sawatch Range	14,440 ft 4401.2 m	9,093 ft 2772 m	671 mi 1,079 km	39.1178°N 106.4454°W
2	Pikes Peak	Front Range	14,115 ft 4302.31 m	5,530 ft 1686 m	60.6 mi 97.6 km	38.8405°N 105.0442°W
3	Blanca Peak	Sangre de Cristo Mountains	14,351 ft 4374 m	5,326 ft 1623 m	103.4 mi 166.4 km	37.5775°N 105.4856°W
4	Culebra Peak	Culebra Range	14,053 ft 4283 m	4,827 ft 1471 m	35.4 mi 56.9 km	37.1224°N 105.1858°W
5	Crestone Peak	Sangre de Cristo Range	14,300 ft 4359 m	4,554 ft 1388 m	27.4 mi 44 km	37.9669°N 105.5855°W
6	Uncompahgre Peak	San Juan Mountains	14,321 ft 4365 m	4,277 ft 1304 m	85 mi 136.8 km	38.0717°N 107.4621°W
7	Flat Top Mountain (Note: The summit of Flat Top Mountain is the highest point of the Flat Tops.)	Flat Tops	12,361 ft 3767.7 m	4,054 ft 1236 m	40.8 mi 65.6 km	40.0147°N 107.0833°W
8	Ute Peak (Note: The summit of Ute Peak is the highest point of Ute Mountain.)	Ute Mountain	9,984 ft 3043 m	4,039 ft 1231 m	34.3 mi 55.2 km	37.2841°N 108.7787°W
9	Mount Wilson	San Miguel Mountains	14,252 ft 4344 m	4,024 ft 1227 m	33 mi 53.1 km	37.8391°N 107.9916°W
10	Mount Lincoln	Mosquito Range	14,293 ft 4356.5 m	3,862 ft 1177 m	22.5 mi 36.2 km	39.3515°N 106.1116°W
11	Greenhorn Mountain (Note: The summit of Greenhorn Mountain is the highest point of the Wet Mountains.)	Wet Mountains	12,352 ft 3765 m	3,777 ft 1151 m	25.2 mi 40.6 km	37.8815°N 105.0133°W
12	West Spanish Peak	Spanish Peaks	13,631 ft 4155 m	3,686 ft 1123 m	19.87 mi 32 km	37.3756°N 104.9934°W
13	Mount Gunnison	West Elk Mountains	12,725 ft 3878.7 m	3,539 ft 1079 m	11.84 mi 19.05 km	38.8121°N 107.3826°W
14	Mount Zirkel (Note: The summit of Mount Zirkel is the highest point of the Park Range.) (Note: The elevation of Mount Zirkel includes an adjustment of +1.632 m (5.35 ft) from NGVD 29 to NAVD 88.)	Park Range	12,185 ft 3714 m	3,470 ft 1058 m	37.7 mi 60.6 km	40.8313°N 106.6631°W
15	San Luis Peak (Note: The summit of San Luis Peak is the highest point of the La Garita Mountains.)	La Garita Mountains	14,022 ft 4273.8 m	3,113 ft 949 m	26.9 mi 43.4 km	37.9868°N 106.9313°W
16	North Mamm Peak	Grand Mesa	11,126 ft 3391.3 m	3,103 ft 946 m	21.2 mi 34.1 km	39.3865°N 107.8660°W
17	West Elk Peak (Note: The summit of West Elk Peak is the highest point of the West Elk Mountains.)	West Elk Mountains	13,042 ft 3975.2 m	3,095 ft 943 m	13.78 mi 22.2 km	38.7179°N 107.1994°W
18	Huntsman Ridge Peak (Note: The elevation of Huntsman Ridge Peak includes an adjustment of +1.711 m (5.61 ft) from NGVD 29 to NAVD 88.) (Dutch Peak)	Elk Mountains	11,858 ft 3614 m	3,072 ft 936 m	10.3 mi 16.58 km	39.1920°N 107.3668°W
19	Mount Sneffels	Sneffels Range	14,158 ft 4315.4 m	3,050 ft 930 m	15.71 mi 25.3 km	38.0038°N 107.7923°W
20	Castle Peak (Note: The elevation of Castle Peak includes an adjustment of +1.575 m (5.17 ft) from NGVD 29 to NAVD 88.)	Sawatch Range	11,305 ft 3446 m	3,040 ft 927 m	16.51 mi 26.6 km	39.7723°N 106.8304°W
21	Mount Powell	Gore Range	13,586 ft 4141 m	3,000 ft 914 m	21.5 mi 34.6 km	39.7601°N 106.3407°W
22	Longs Peak	Front Range	14,259 ft 4346 m	2,940 ft 896 m	43.6 mi 70.2 km	40.2550°N 105.6151°W
23	Hesperus Mountain	La Plata Mountains	13,237 ft 4035 m	2,852 ft 869 m	24.5 mi 39.5 km	37.4451°N 108.0890°W
24	Diamond Peak (Note: The elevation of Diamond Peak includes an adjustment of +1.436 m (4.71 ft) from NGVD 29 to NAVD 88.)	Green River Basin	9,665 ft 2946 m	2,845 ft 867 m	29.7 mi 47.8 km	40.9504°N 108.8782°W
25	Treasure Mountain	Elk Mountains	13,535 ft 4125 m	2,828 ft 862 m	6.92 mi 11.13 km	39.0244°N 107.1228°W
26	Clark Peak (Note: The summit of Clark Peak is the highest point of the Medicine Bow Mountains.)	Medicine Bow Mountains	12,954 ft 3948.4 m	2,771 ft 845 m	16.4 mi 26.4 km	40.6068°N 105.9300°W
27	Grays Peak	Front Range	14,278 ft 4352 m	2,770 ft 844 m	25 mi 40.2 km	39.6339°N 105.8176°W
28	Mount Evans (Note: The summit elevation of Mount Evans includes a vertical offset of +1.798 m (5.9 ft) from the station benchmark.)	Front Range	14,271 ft 4350 m	2,770 ft 844 m	9.79 mi 15.76 km	39.5883°N 105.6438°W
29	Summit Peak	San Juan Mountains	13,308 ft 4056.2 m	2,760 ft 841 m	39.6 mi 63.7 km	37.3506°N 106.6968°W
30	Marcellina Mountain (Note: The elevation of Marcellina Mountain includes an adjustment of +1.658 m (5.44 ft) from NGVD 29 to NAVD 88.)	West Elk Mountains	11,353 ft 3461 m	2,728 ft 831 m	5.08 mi 8.18 km	38.9299°N 107.2438°W
31	Mount Richthofen (Note: The summit of Mount Richthofen is the highest point of the Never Summer Mountains.) (Note: The elevation of Mount Richthofen includes an adjustment of +1.658 m (5.44 ft) from NGVD 29 to NAVD 88.)	Never Summer Mountains	12,945 ft 3946 m	2,680 ft 817 m	9.66 mi 15.54 km	40.4695°N 105.8945°W
31	Piñon Mesa HP (Note: The elevation of Piñon Mesa HP includes an adjustment of +1.408 m (4.62 ft) from NGVD 29 to NAVD 88.)	Uncompahgre Plateau	9,705 ft 2958 m	2,680 ft 817 m	23.7 mi 38.2 km	38.8260°N 108.7719°W
33	Parkview Mountain (Note: The summit of Parkview Mountain is the highest point of the Rabbit Ears Range.)	Rabbit Ears Range	12,301 ft 3749.4 m	2,676 ft 816 m	9.36 mi 15.07 km	40.3303°N 106.1363°W
34	Mount Ouray	Sawatch Range	13,961 ft 4255.4 m	2,659 ft 810 m	13.58 mi 21.9 km	38.4227°N 106.2247°W
35	Crested Butte (Note: The elevation of Crested Butte includes an adjustment of +1.94 m (6.36 ft) from NGVD 29 to NAVD 88.)	Elk Mountains	12,168 ft 3709 m	2,582 ft 787 m	4.65 mi 7.49 km	38.8835°N 106.9436°W
36	Graham Peak	San Juan Mountains	12,536 ft 3821.1 m	2,551 ft 778 m	8.64 mi 13.9 km	37.4972°N 107.3761°W
37	Mount Antero	Sawatch Range	14,276 ft 4351.4 m	2,503 ft 763 m	17.67 mi 28.4 km	38.6741°N 106.2462°W
38	East Beckwith Mountain	West Elk Mountains	12,441 ft 3792.1 m	2,492 ft 760 m	6.24 mi 10.05 km	38.8464°N 107.2233°W
39	Chair Mountain	Elk Mountains	12,727 ft 3879.1 m	2,461 ft 750 m	8.89 mi 14.3 km	39.0581°N 107.2822°W
40	Whetstone Mountain	West Elk Mountains	12,527 ft 3818.1 m	2,456 ft 749 m	9.39 mi 15.11 km	38.8223°N 106.9799°W
41	Bison Mountain (Note: The summit of Bison Mountain is the highest point of the Tarryall Mountains.) (Bison Peak)	Tarryall Mountains	12,432 ft 3789.4 m	2,451 ft 747 m	18.23 mi 29.3 km	39.2384°N 105.4978°W
42	South River Peak	San Juan Mountains	13,154 ft 4009.4 m	2,448 ft 746 m	21.1 mi 34 km	37.5741°N 106.9815°W
43	Black Mountain (Note: The elevation of Black Mountain includes an adjustment of +1.537 m (5.04 ft) from NGVD 29 to NAVD 88.)	Elkhead Mountains	10,865 ft 3312 m	2,440 ft 744 m	16.4 mi 26.4 km	40.7835°N 107.3691°W
44	Mount Guero	West Elk Mountains	12,058 ft 3675.4 m	2,432 ft 741 m	6.38 mi 10.27 km	38.7196°N 107.3861°W
45	Hagues Peak	Mummy Range	13,573 ft 4137 m	2,420 ft 738 m	15.7 mi 25.3 km	40.4845°N 105.6464°W
46	Antora Peak	Sawatch Range	13,275 ft 4046 m	2,409 ft 734 m	6.75 mi 10.86 km	38.3250°N 106.2180°W
47	Bushnell Peak	Sangre de Cristo Mountains	13,110 ft 3995.8 m	2,405 ft 733 m	11.07 mi 17.82 km	38.3412°N 105.8892°W
48	Zenobia Peak	Uinta Mountains	9,022 ft 2750 m	2,395 ft 730 m	22.8 mi 36.7 km	40.6072°N 108.8701°W
49	East Spanish Peak (Note: The elevation of East Spanish Peak includes an adjustment of +1.372 m (4.5 ft) from NGVD 29 to NAVD 88.)	Spanish Peaks	12,688 ft 3867 m	2,383 ft 726 m	4.21 mi 6.78 km	37.3934°N 104.9201°W
50	Castle Peak	Elk Mountains	14,279 ft 4352.2 m	2,365 ft 721 m	20.9 mi 33.6 km	39.0097°N 106.8614°W

== Most isolated major summits ==
Of the most isolated major summits of Colorado, Mount Elbert exceeds 1000 kilometers (621.4 miles) of topographic isolation and three peaks exceed 100 kilometers (62.14 miles) of topographic isolation.

The 50 most topographically isolated summits of Colorado with at least 500 meters of topographic prominence
Rank	Mountain peak	Mountain range	Elevation	Prominence	Isolation	Location
1	Mount Elbert	Sawatch Range	14,440 ft 4401.2 m	9,093 ft 2772 m	671 mi 1,079 km	39.1178°N 106.4454°W
2	Blanca Peak	Sangre de Cristo Mountains	14,351 ft 4374 m	5,326 ft 1623 m	103.4 mi 166.4 km	37.5775°N 105.4856°W
3	Uncompahgre Peak	San Juan Mountains	14,321 ft 4365 m	4,277 ft 1304 m	85 mi 136.8 km	38.0717°N 107.4621°W
4	Pikes Peak	Front Range	14,115 ft 4302.31 m	5,530 ft 1686 m	60.6 mi 97.6 km	38.8405°N 105.0442°W
5	Longs Peak	Front Range	14,259 ft 4346 m	2,940 ft 896 m	43.6 mi 70.2 km	40.2550°N 105.6151°W
6	Flat Top Mountain	Flat Tops	12,361 ft 3767.7 m	4,054 ft 1236 m	40.8 mi 65.6 km	40.0147°N 107.0833°W
7	Summit Peak	San Juan Mountains	13,308 ft 4056.2 m	2,760 ft 841 m	39.6 mi 63.7 km	37.3506°N 106.6968°W
8	Mount Zirkel	Park Range	12,185 ft 3714 m	3,470 ft 1058 m	37.7 mi 60.6 km	40.8313°N 106.6631°W
9	Culebra Peak	Culebra Range	14,053 ft 4283 m	4,827 ft 1471 m	35.4 mi 56.9 km	37.1224°N 105.1858°W
10	Ute Peak	Ute Mountain	9,984 ft 3043 m	4,039 ft 1231 m	34.3 mi 55.2 km	37.2841°N 108.7787°W
11	Mount Wilson	San Miguel Mountains	14,252 ft 4344 m	4,024 ft 1227 m	33 mi 53.1 km	37.8391°N 107.9916°W
12	Fishers Peak (Note: The summit of Fishers Peak is the highest point of Raton Mesa.) (Note: Fishers Peak is the easternmost summit of its elevation in the Rocky Mountains and the United States.)	Raton Mesa	9,633 ft 2936.2 m	1,847 ft 563 m	31 mi 49.9 km	37.0982°N 104.4628°W
13	Diamond Peak	Green River Basin	9,665 ft 2946 m	2,845 ft 867 m	29.7 mi 47.8 km	40.9504°N 108.8782°W
14	Crestone Peak	Sangre de Cristo Range	14,300 ft 4359 m	4,554 ft 1388 m	27.4 mi 44 km	37.9669°N 105.5855°W
15	San Luis Peak	La Garita Mountains	14,022 ft 4273.8 m	3,113 ft 949 m	26.9 mi 43.4 km	37.9868°N 106.9313°W
16	Windom Peak	Needle Mountains	14,093 ft 4296 m	2,187 ft 667 m	26.3 mi 42.4 km	37.6212°N 107.5919°W
17	Greenhorn Mountain	Wet Mountains	12,352 ft 3765 m	3,777 ft 1151 m	25.2 mi 40.6 km	37.8815°N 105.0133°W
18	Grays Peak	Front Range	14,278 ft 4352 m	2,770 ft 844 m	25 mi 40.2 km	39.6339°N 105.8176°W
19	Hesperus Mountain	La Plata Mountains	13,237 ft 4035 m	2,852 ft 869 m	24.5 mi 39.5 km	37.4451°N 108.0890°W
20	Piñon Mesa HP	Uncompahgre Plateau	9,705 ft 2958 m	2,680 ft 817 m	23.7 mi 38.2 km	38.8260°N 108.7719°W
21	Zenobia Peak	Uinta Mountains	9,022 ft 2750 m	2,395 ft 730 m	22.8 mi 36.7 km	40.6072°N 108.8701°W
22	Mount Lincoln	Mosquito Range	14,293 ft 4356.5 m	3,862 ft 1177 m	22.5 mi 36.2 km	39.3515°N 106.1116°W
23	Mount Powell	Gore Range	13,586 ft 4141 m	3,000 ft 914 m	21.5 mi 34.6 km	39.7601°N 106.3407°W
24	North Mamm Peak	Front Range	11,126 ft 3391.3 m	3,103 ft 946 m	21.2 mi 34.1 km	39.3865°N 107.8660°W
25	South River Peak	San Juan Mountains	13,154 ft 4009.4 m	2,448 ft 746 m	21.1 mi 34 km	37.5741°N 106.9815°W
26	Castle Peak	Elk Mountains	14,279 ft 4352.2 m	2,365 ft 721 m	20.9 mi 33.6 km	39.0097°N 106.8614°W
27	Cross Mountain	Uinta Mountains	7,814 ft 2381.8 m	1,674 ft 510 m	20.3 mi 32.7 km	40.5221°N 108.3816°W
28	West Spanish Peak	Spanish Peaks	13,631 ft 4155 m	3,686 ft 1123 m	19.87 mi 32 km	37.3756°N 104.9934°W
29	Waugh Mountain (Note: The summit of Waugh Mountain is the highest point of the South Park Hills.) (Note: The elevation of Waugh Mountain includes an adjustment of +1.702 m (5.58 ft) from NGVD 29 to NAVD 88.)	South Park Hills	11,716 ft 3571 m	2,330 ft 710 m	18.86 mi 30.4 km	38.6022°N 105.6955°W
30	Mount of the Holy Cross	Sawatch Range	14,011 ft 4270.5 m	2,113 ft 644 m	18.41 mi 29.6 km	39.4668°N 106.4817°W
31	Bison Mountain (Bison Peak)	Tarryall Mountains	12,432 ft 3789.4 m	2,451 ft 747 m	18.23 mi 29.3 km	39.2384°N 105.4978°W
32	Crater Peak (Note: The summit of Crater Peak is the highest point of Grand Mesa.)	Front Range	11,333 ft 3454.2 m	2,307 ft 703 m	17.98 mi 28.9 km	39.0396°N 107.6628°W
33	Sand Mountain North (Note: The summit of Sand Mountain North is the highest point of the Elkhead Mountains.) (Note: The elevation of Sand Mountain North includes an adjustment of +1.502 m (4.93 ft) from NGVD 29 to NAVD 88.)	Elkhead Mountains	10,884 ft 3317 m	2,179 ft 664 m	17.7 mi 28.5 km	40.7636°N 107.0575°W
34	Mount Antero	Sawatch Range	14,276 ft 4351.4 m	2,503 ft 763 m	17.67 mi 28.4 km	38.6741°N 106.2462°W
35	Bennett Peak	San Juan Mountains	13,209 ft 4026 m	1,743 ft 531 m	17.08 mi 27.5 km	37.4833°N 106.4343°W
36	Sawtooth Mountain	La Garita Mountains	12,153 ft 3704.2 m	1,927 ft 587 m	16.73 mi 26.9 km	38.2740°N 106.8670°W
37	Castle Peak	Sawatch Range	11,305 ft 3446 m	3,040 ft 927 m	16.51 mi 26.6 km	39.7723°N 106.8304°W
38	Clark Peak	Medicine Bow Mountains	12,954 ft 3948.4 m	2,771 ft 845 m	16.4 mi 26.4 km	40.6068°N 105.9300°W
38	Black Mountain	Elkhead Mountains	10,865 ft 3312 m	2,440 ft 744 m	16.4 mi 26.4 km	40.7835°N 107.3691°W
40	Mount Sneffels	Sneffels Range	14,158 ft 4315.4 m	3,050 ft 930 m	15.71 mi 25.3 km	38.0038°N 107.7923°W
41	Hagues Peak	Mummy Range	13,573 ft 4137 m	2,420 ft 738 m	15.7 mi 25.3 km	40.4845°N 105.6464°W
42	North Arapaho Peak	Front Range	13,508 ft 4117 m	1,665 ft 507 m	15.38 mi 24.8 km	40.0265°N 105.6504°W
43	Piñon Hills HP	Piñon Hills	9,480 ft 2889.4 m	1,724 ft 525 m	15.15 mi 24.4 km	37.1397°N 105.8238°W
44	Mount Harvard	Sawatch Range	14,421 ft 4395.6 m	2,360 ft 719 m	14.92 mi 24 km	38.9244°N 106.3207°W
45	Mount Mestas (Note: The elevation of Mount Mestas includes an adjustment of +1.372 m (4.5 ft) from NGVD 29 to NAVD 88.)	Sangre de Cristo Mountains	11,574 ft 3528 m	2,229 ft 679 m	14.47 mi 23.3 km	37.5830°N 105.1474°W
46	Archuleta Mesa (Note: The elevation of Archuleta Mesa includes an adjustment of +1.351 m (4.43 ft) from NGVD 29 to NAVD 88.)	San Juan Mountains	9,224 ft 2812 m	1,720 ft 524 m	14.32 mi 23.1 km	37.0235°N 106.9630°W
47	West Elk Peak	West Elk Mountains	13,042 ft 3975.2 m	3,095 ft 943 m	13.78 mi 22.2 km	38.7179°N 107.1994°W
48	Tanks Peak	Uinta Mountains	8,726 ft 2659.6 m	2,247 ft 685 m	13.66 mi 22 km	40.4259°N 108.7660°W
49	Mount Ouray	Sawatch Range	13,961 ft 4255.4 m	2,659 ft 810 m	13.58 mi 21.9 km	38.4227°N 106.2247°W
50	Horse Mountain (Note: The elevation of Horse Mountain includes an adjustment of +1.461 m (4.79 ft) from NGVD 29 to NAVD 88.)	San Juan Mountains	9,952 ft 3033 m	1,887 ft 575 m	13.06 mi 21 km	37.3080°N 107.2864°W

== Gallery ==
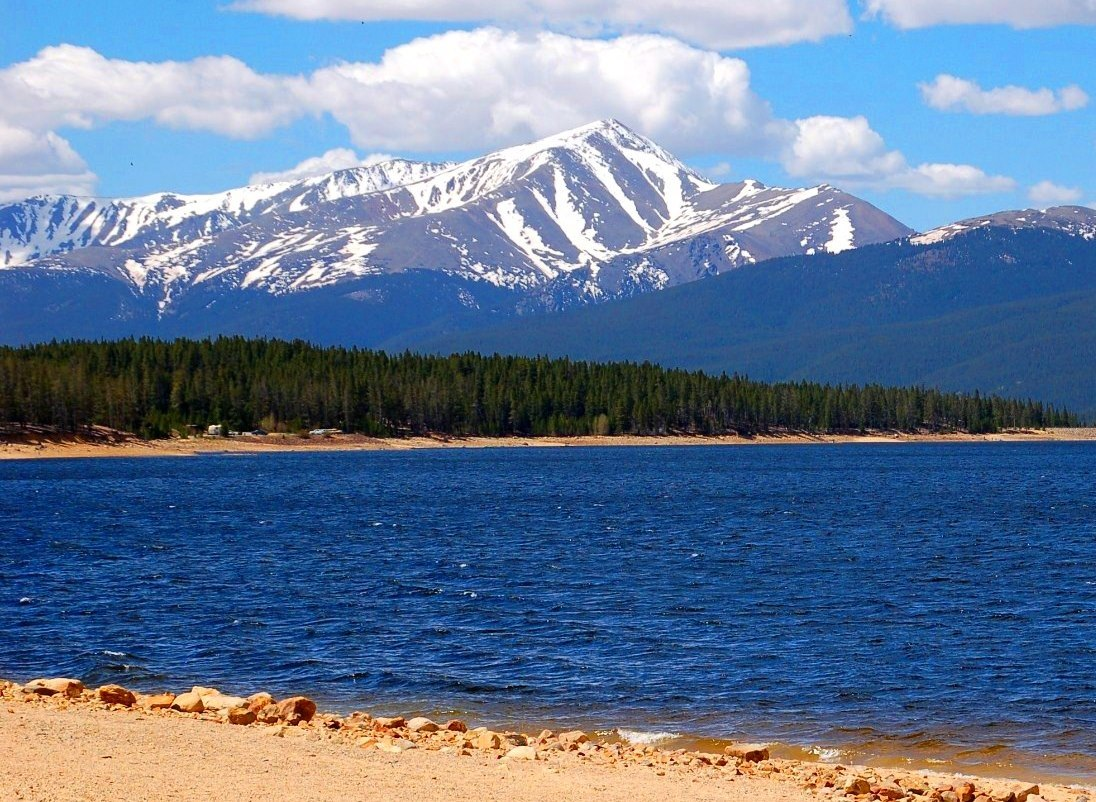
Mount Elbert in the Sawatch Range is the highest peak of the Rocky Mountains.

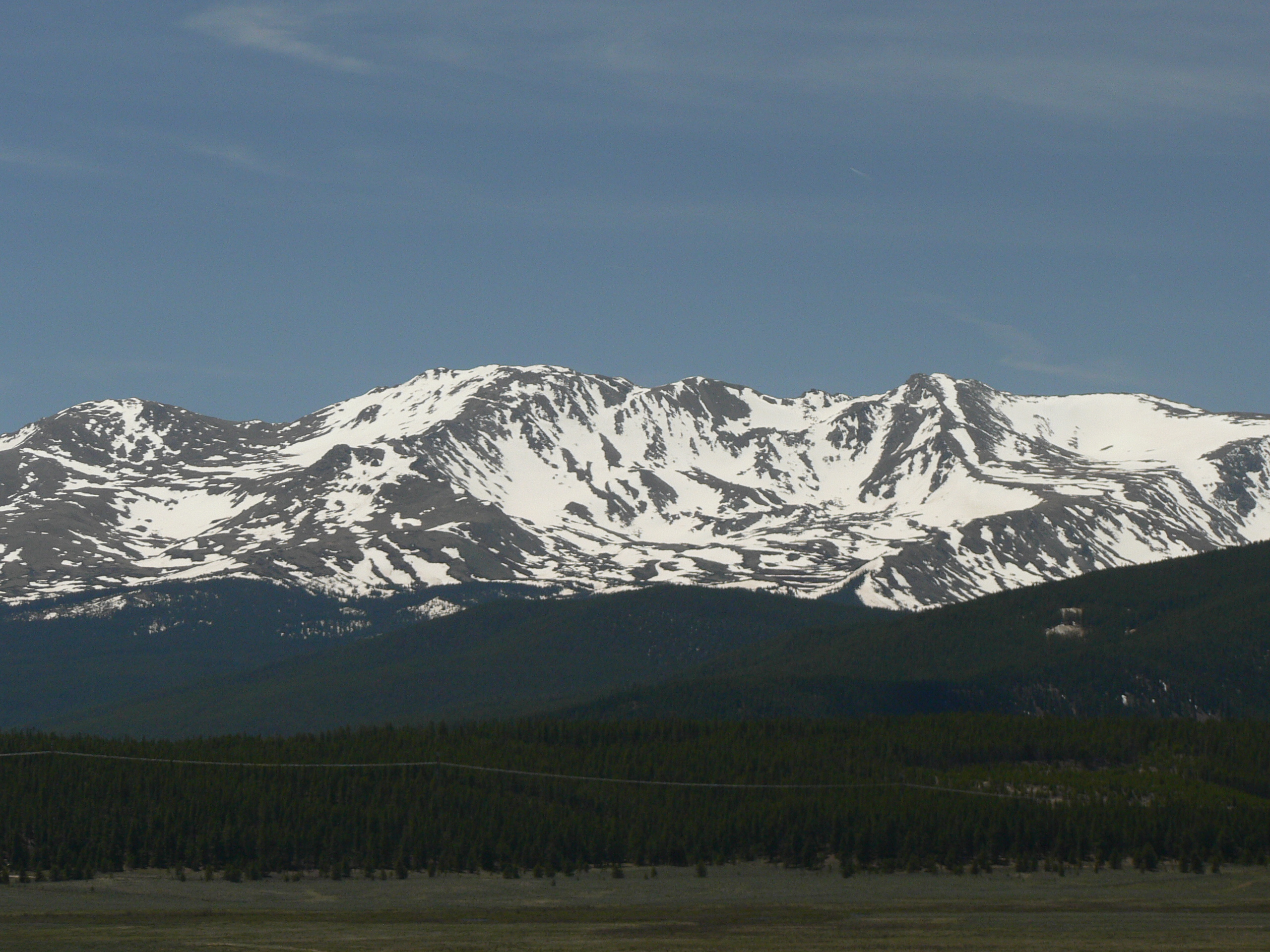
Mount Massive in the Sawatch Range is the second highest peak of the Rocky Mountains.

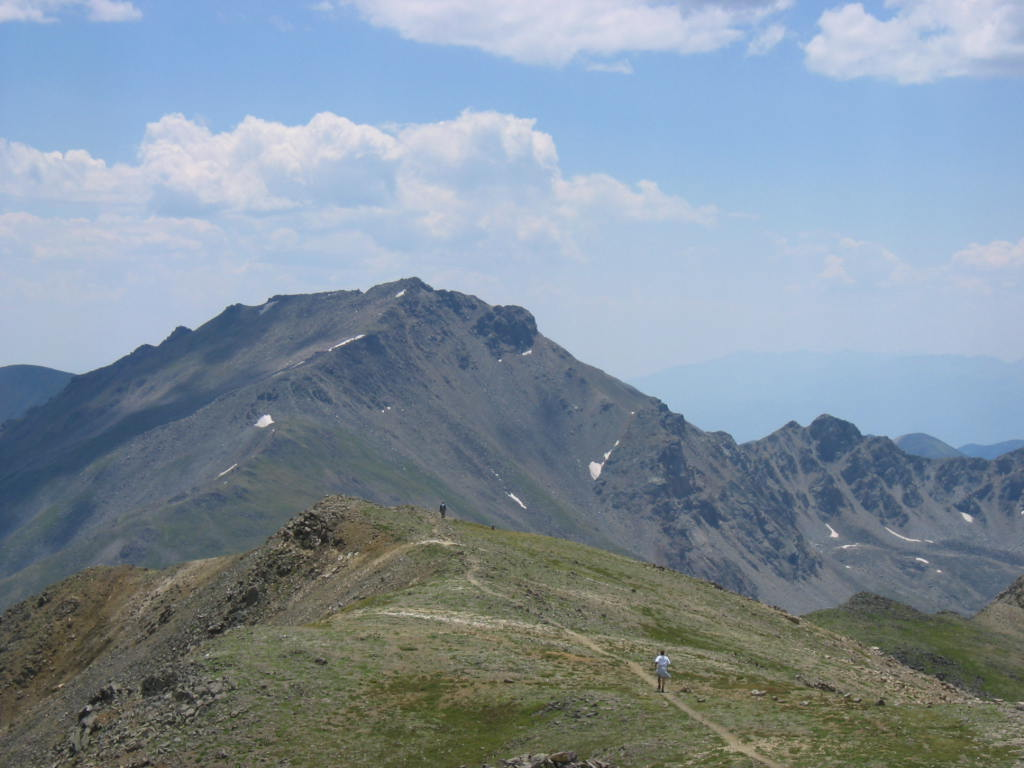
Mount Harvard is the highest of the Collegiate Peaks and the third highest peak of the Rocky Mountains.

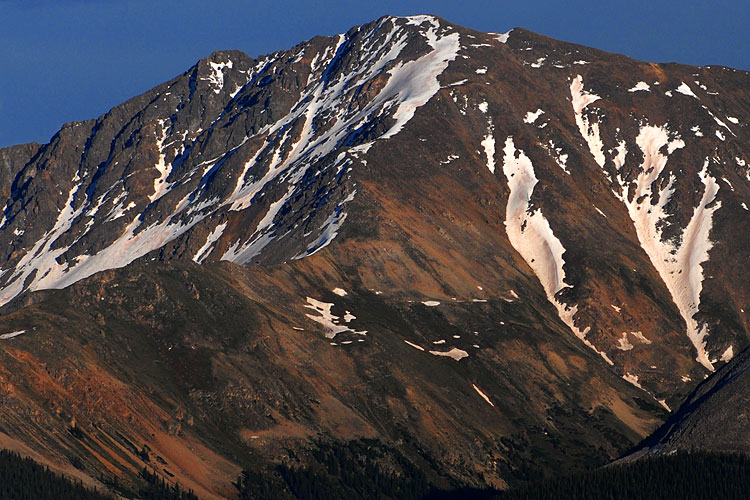
La Plata Peak in the Collegiate Peaks is the fifth highest peak of the Rocky Mountains.

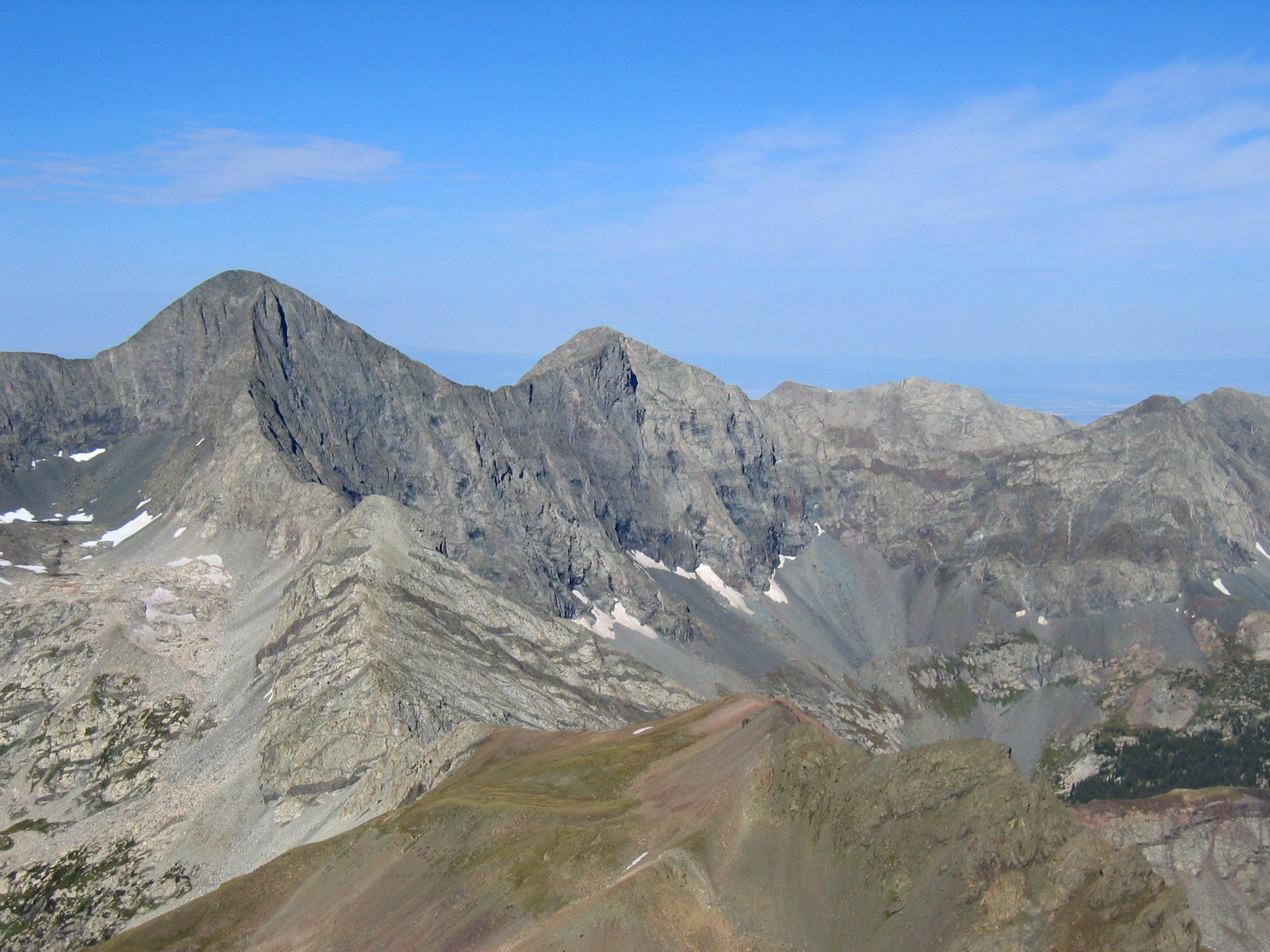
Blanca Peak is the highest peak of the Sangre de Cristo Mountains and the second most topographically isolated peak of Colorado.

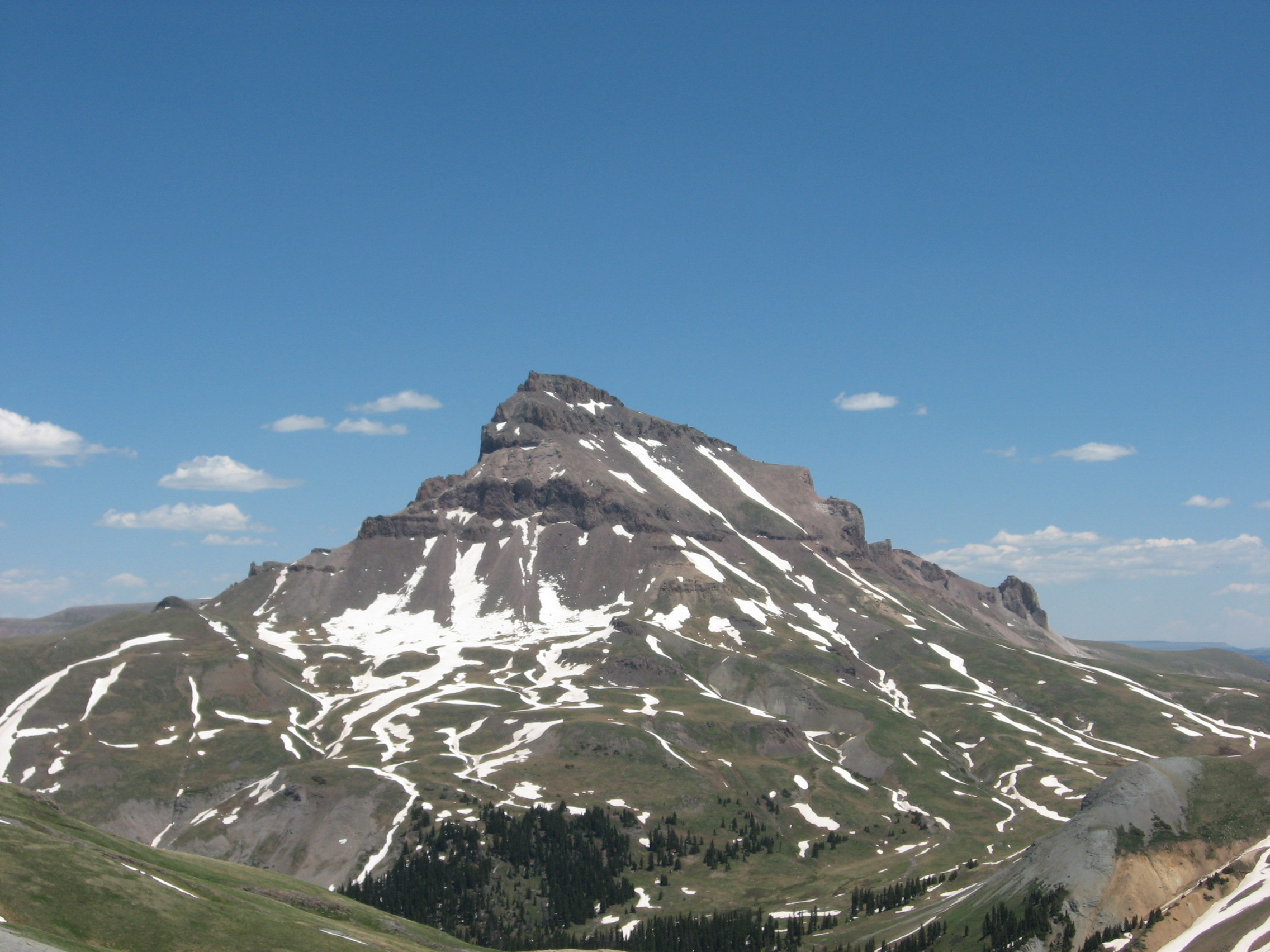
Uncompahgre Peak is the highest peak of the San Juan Mountains and the sixth highest peak of the Rocky Mountains.

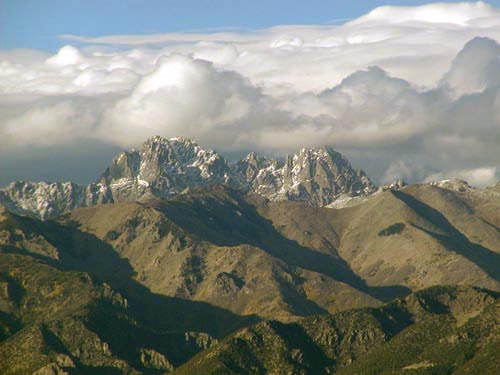
Crestone Peak is the highest peak of the Crestones and the seventh highest peak of the Rocky Mountains.

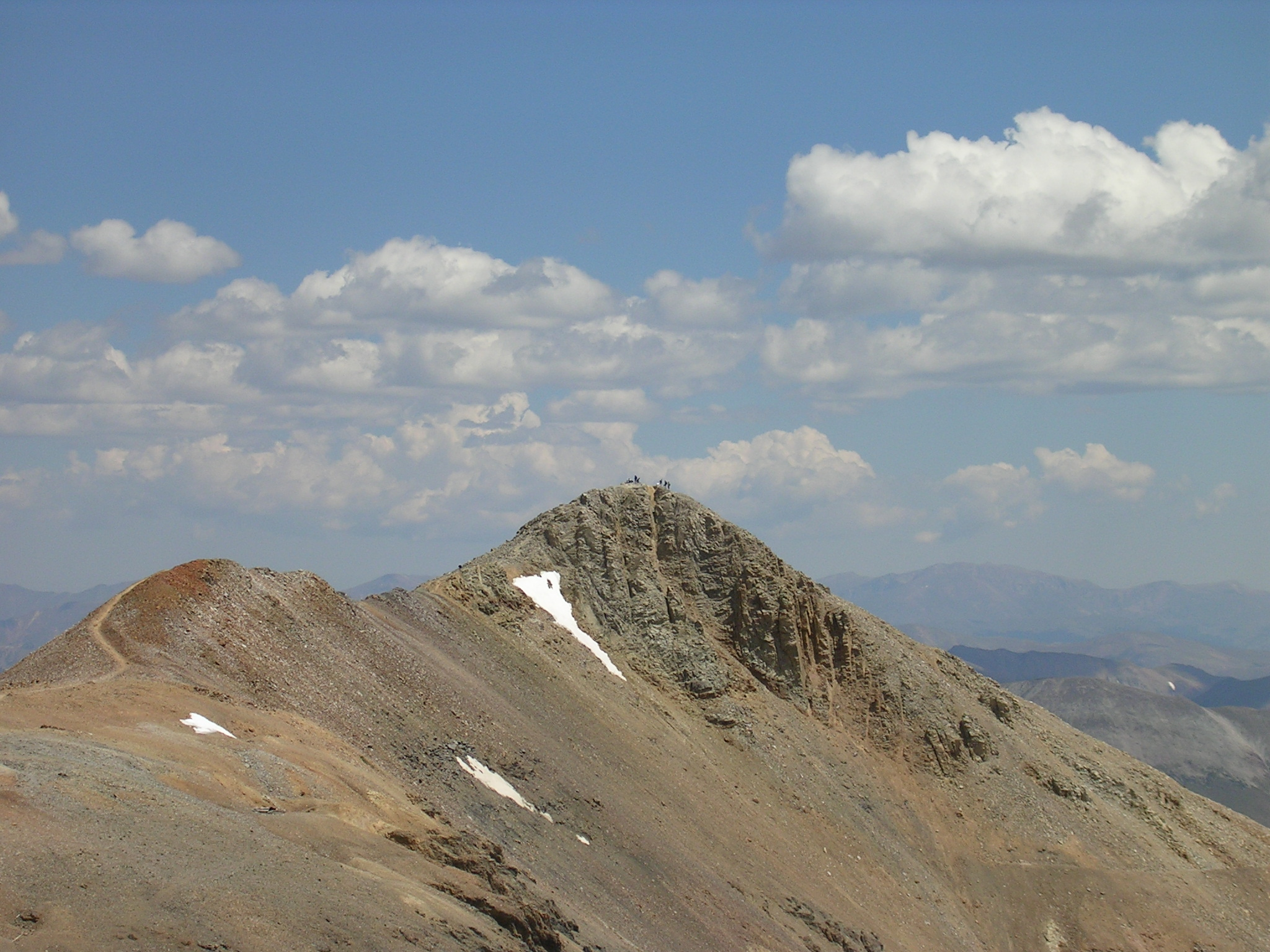
Mount Lincoln is the highest peak of the Mosquito Range and the eighth highest peak of the Rocky Mountains.

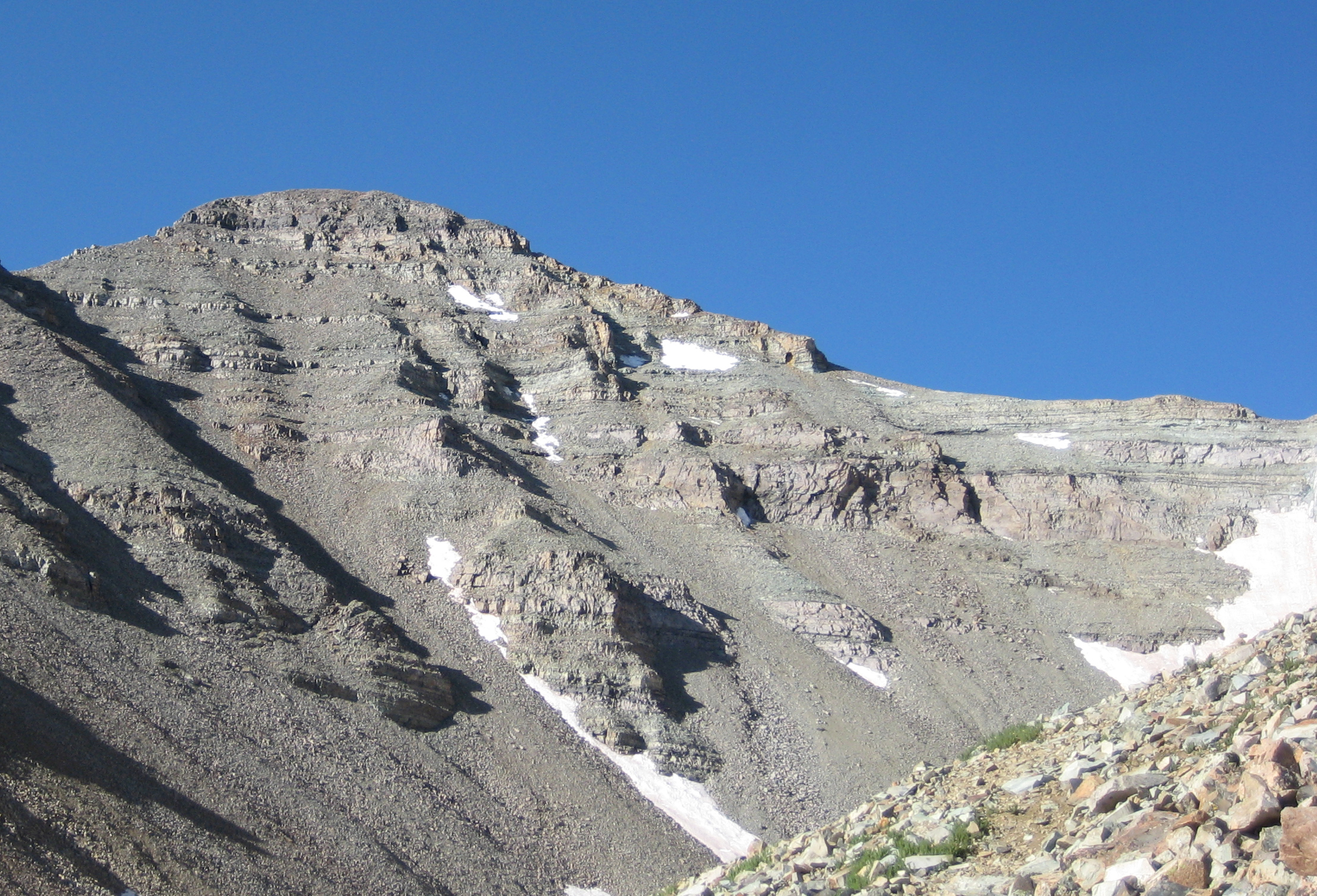
Castle Peak is the highest peak of the Elk Mountains and the ninth highest peak of the Rocky Mountains.

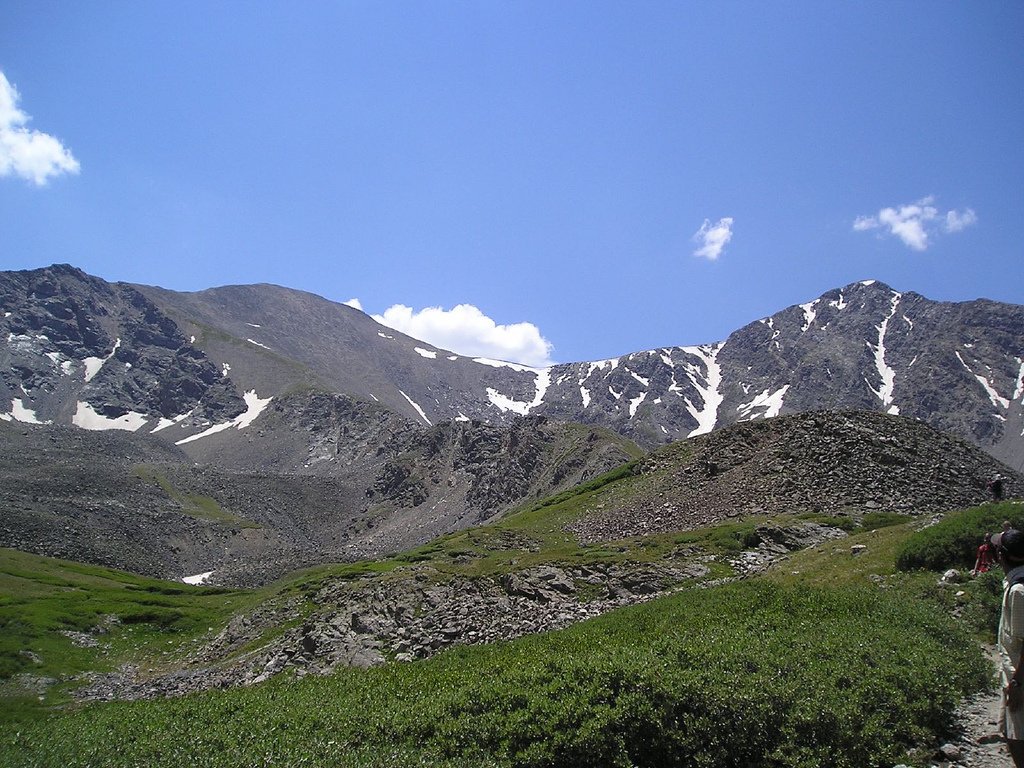
Grays Peak is the highest peak of the Front Range, the highest point on the Continental Divide, and the tenth highest peak of the Rocky Mountains.

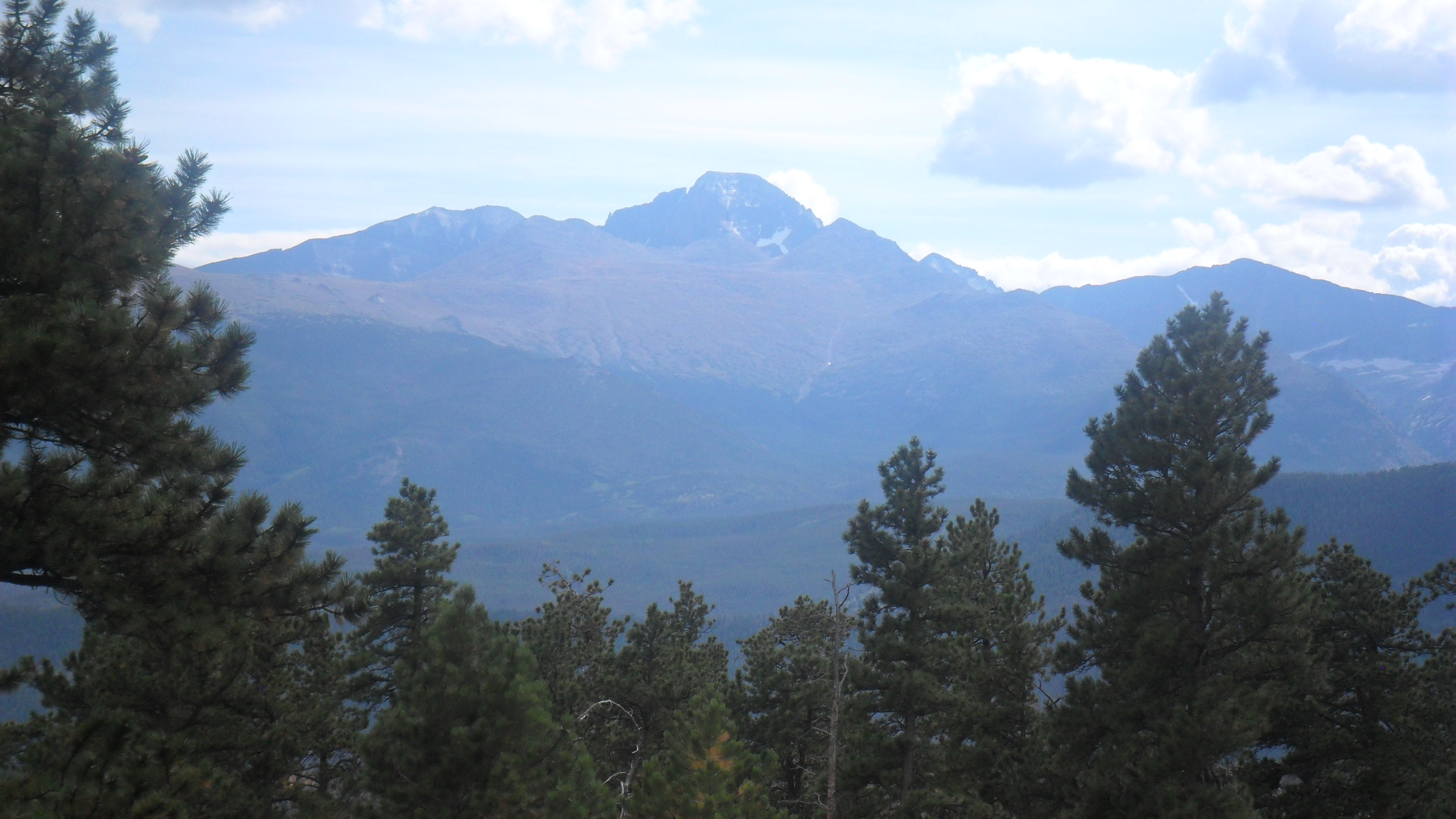
Longs Peak is the highest peak in Rocky Mountain National Park and northern Colorado.

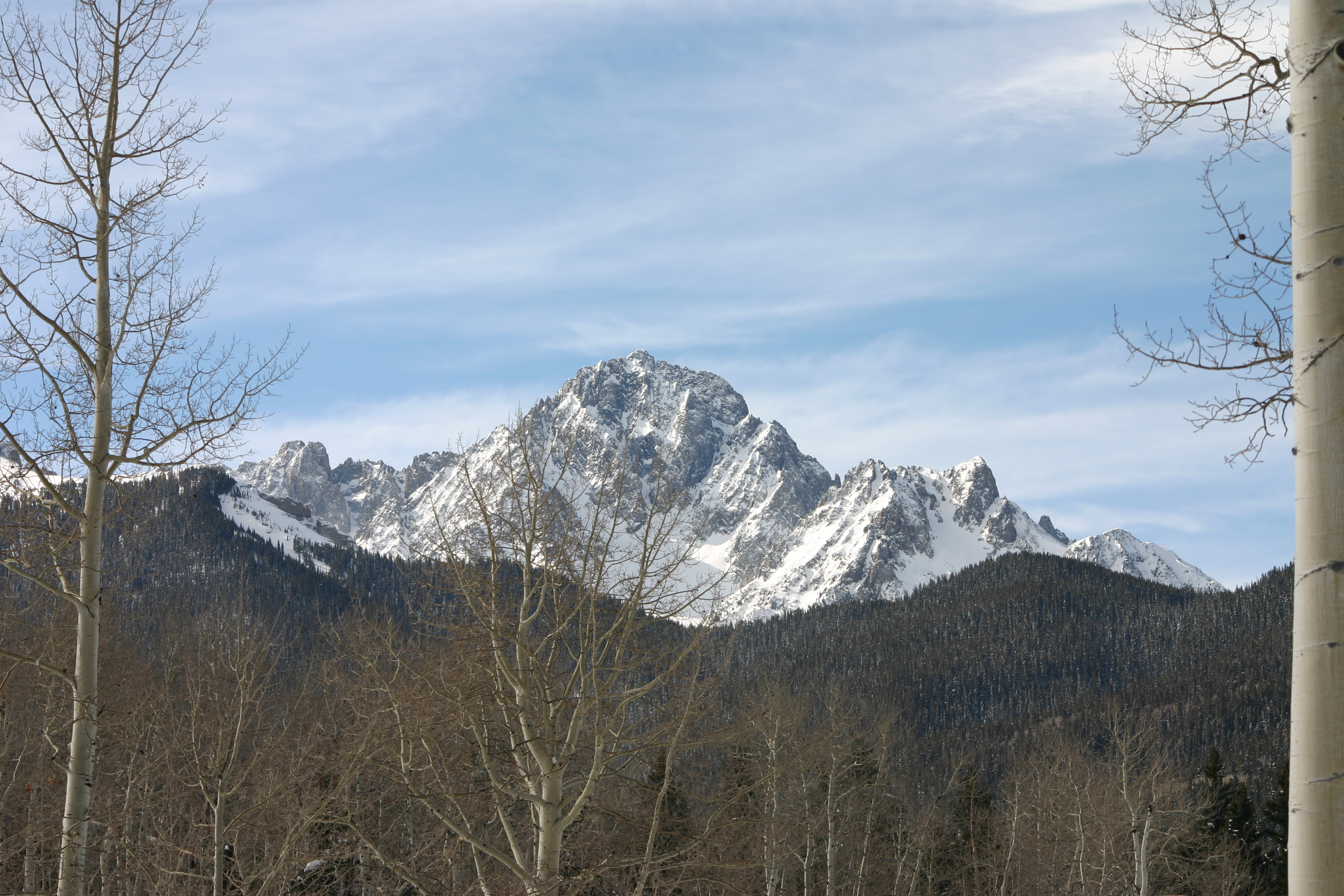
Impressive Mount Sneffels in southwestern Colorado is often said to be the most beautiful mountain in the state.

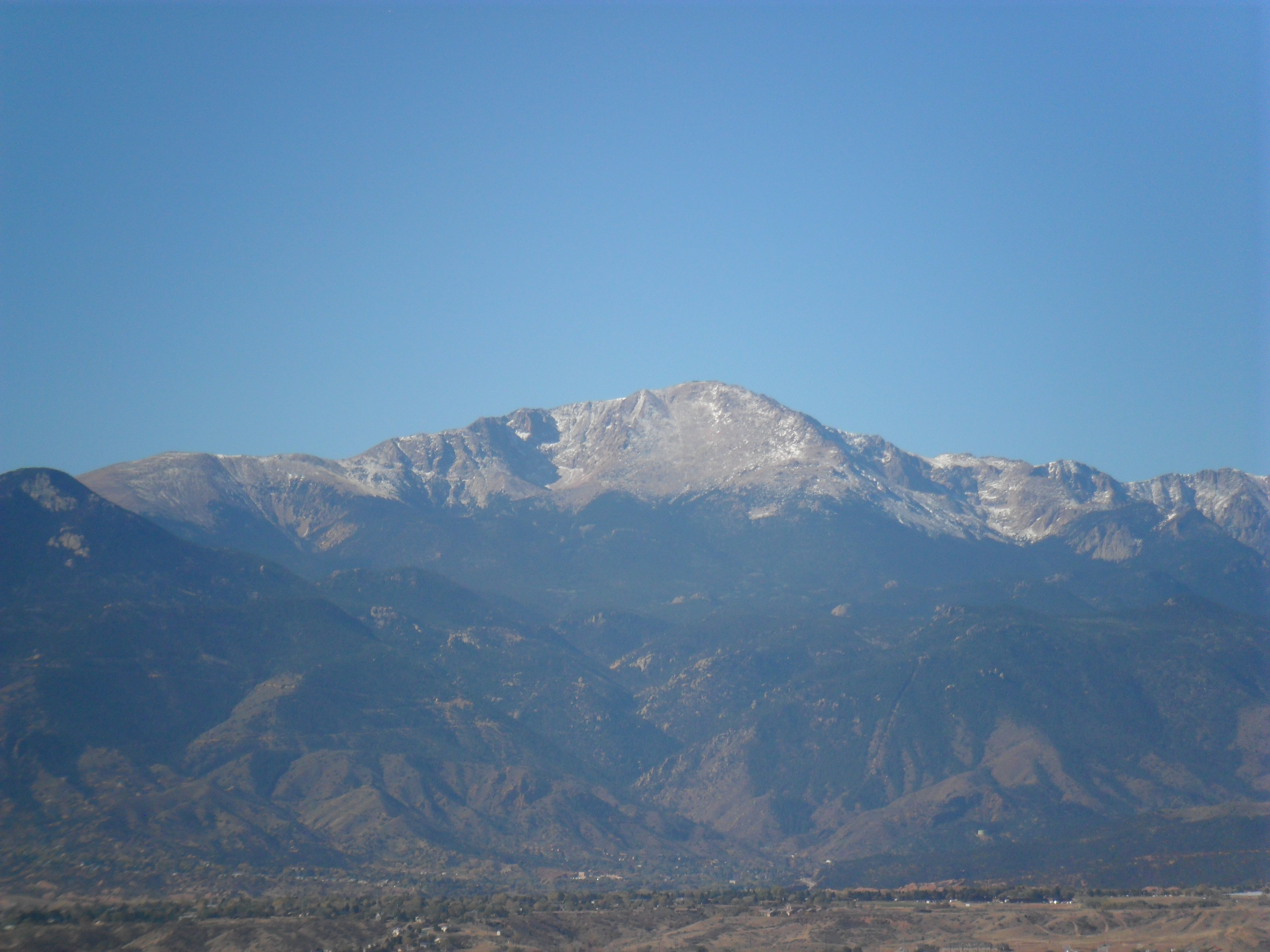
Pikes Peak is the second most topographically prominent mountain summit of Colorado and the easternmost fourteener. The peak sits on top of Pikes Mountain.

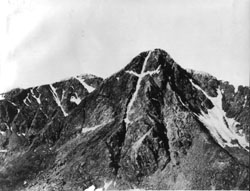
This photograph of the legendary Mount of the Holy Cross was taken by William Henry Jackson in 1874.

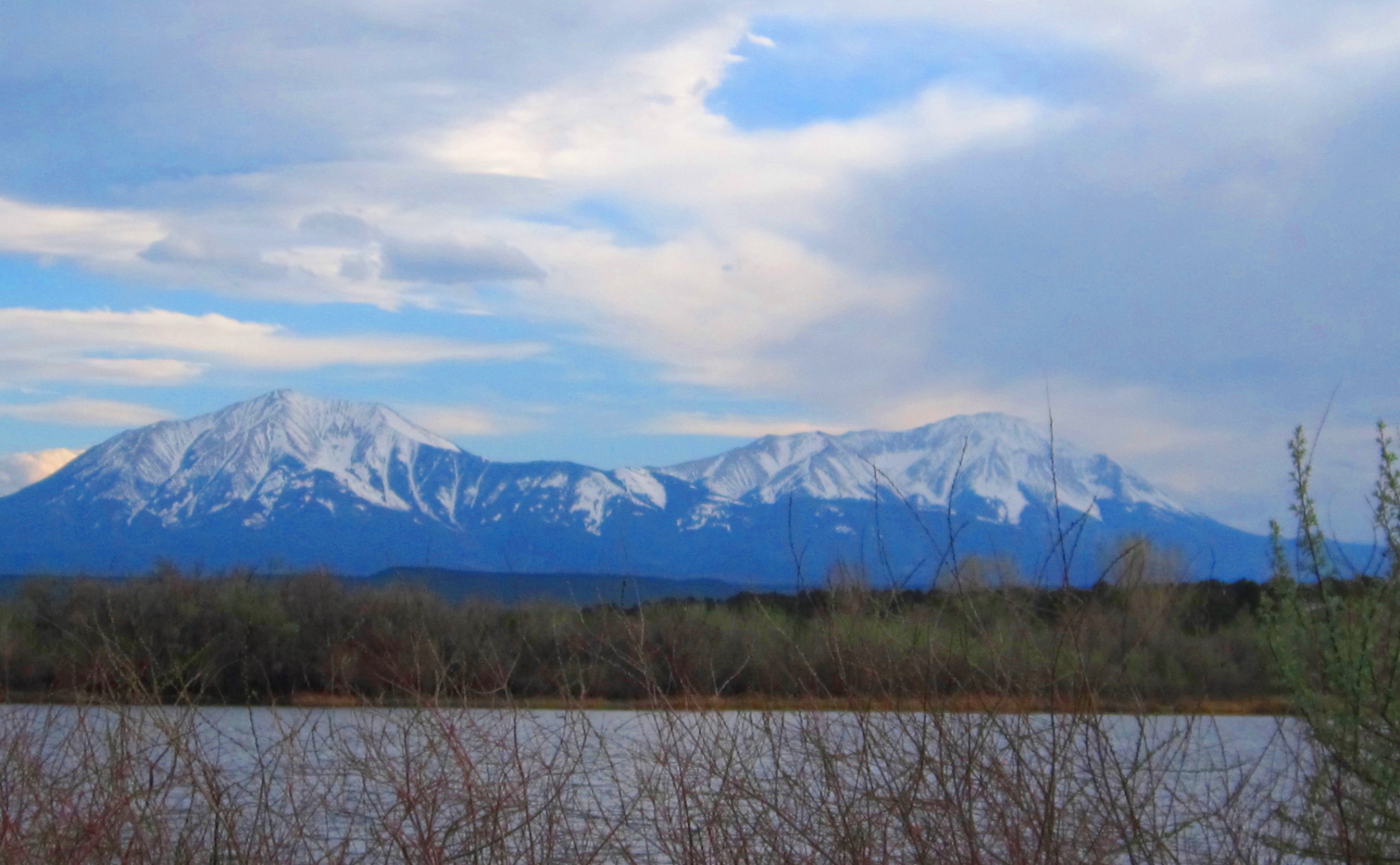
The Spanish Peaks in southern Colorado are two prominent mountains which can be seen for many miles.

== See also ==
- Bibliography of Colorado
- Geography of Colorado
- History of Colorado
- Index of Colorado-related articles
- List of Colorado-related lists
- Outline of Colorado
