= Bard Peak =

Mountain in Colorado, United States

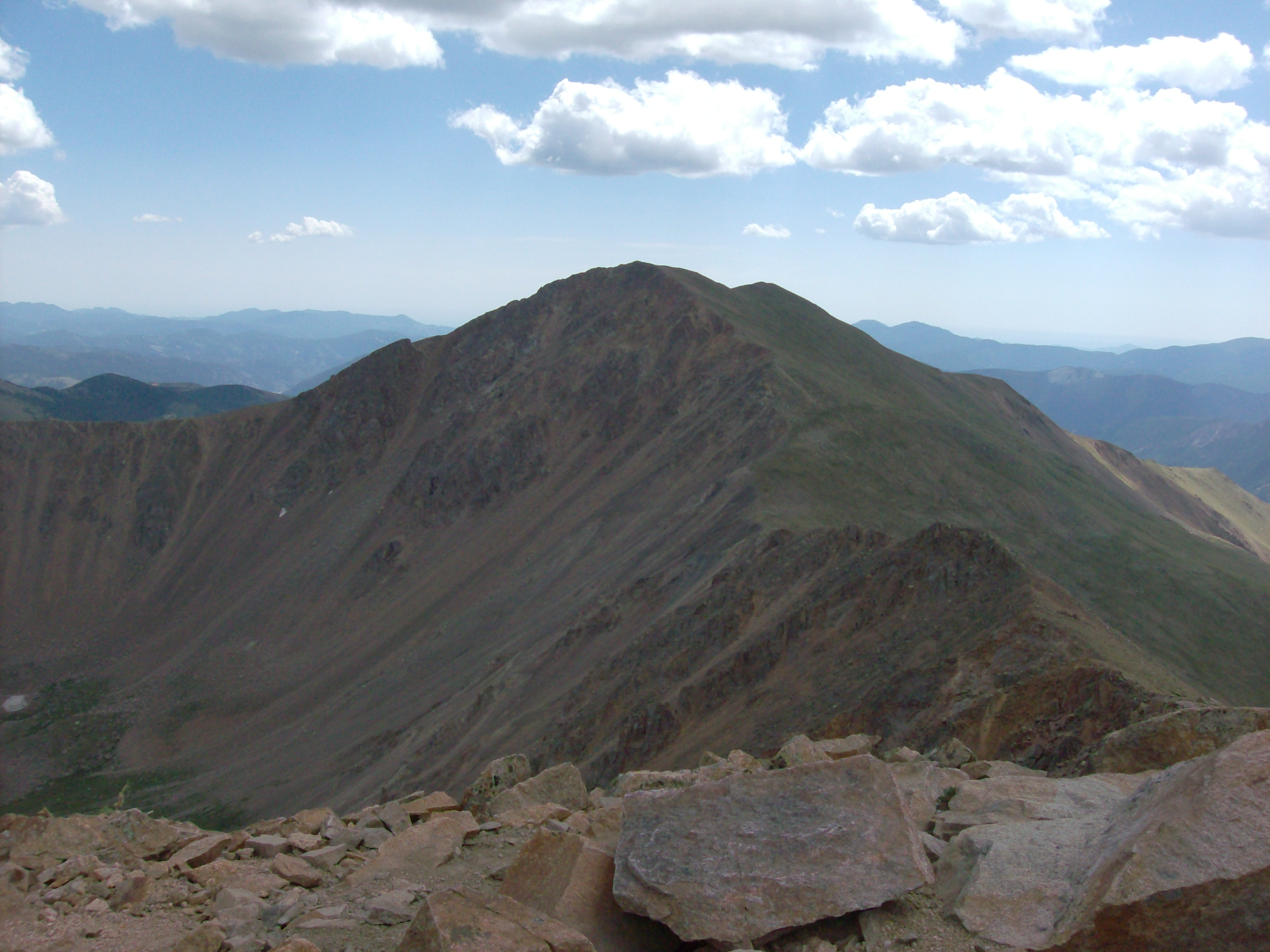
- Bard Peak as seen from Mount Parnassus.

Highest point
- Elevation: 13,647 ft (4,160 m)
- Prominence: 1,701 ft (518 m)
- Isolation: 5.43 mi (8.74 km)
- Listing: North America highest peaks 86th; US highest major peaks 69th; Colorado highest major peaks 34th
- Coordinates: 39°43′13″N 105°48′14″W

Geography
- Location within Colorado
- Location: Clear Creek County, Colorado, United States
- Parent range: Front Range
- Topo map(s): USGS 7.5' topographic map Grays Peak, Colorado

Bard Peak is a high and prominent mountain summit in the Front Range of the Rocky Mountains of North America. The 13,647-foot (4,160 m) thirteener is located in Arapaho National Forest, 4.5 miles (7.2 km) west-northwest (bearing 293°) of the Town of Silver Plume in Clear Creek County, Colorado, United States.

== See also ==
- List of mountain peaks of North America
  - List of mountain peaks of the United States
    - List of mountain peaks of Colorado
