= South River Peak =

Mountain in the U.S. state of Colorado

- Location within Colorado

Highest point
- Elevation: 13,154 ft (4,009 m)
- Prominence: 2,448 ft (746 m)
- Isolation: 21.12 mi (33.99 km)
- Listing: North America highest peaks 123rd; US highest major peaks 102nd; Colorado highest major peaks 55th
- Coordinates: 37°34′27″N 106°58′54″W

Geography
- Location: Mineral County, Colorado, U.S.
- Parent range: San Juan Mountains
- Topo map(s): USGS 7.5' topographic map South River Peak, Colorado

South River Peak, elevation 13,154 ft (4,009 m), is a summit in the San Juan Mountains of southwestern Colorado, United States. The mountain is in the Weminuche Wilderness of Rio Grande National Forest.

== Climate ==
South River Peak has an Alpine climate (Köppen ET). There is no weather station at the summit of South River Peak, but this climate table contains interpolated data for an area around the summit.

Climate data for South River Peak 37.5683 N, 106.9760 W, Elevation: 12,644 ft (3,854 m) (1991–2020 normals)
| Month | Jan | Feb | Mar | Apr | May | Jun | Jul | Aug | Sep | Oct | Nov | Dec | Year |
|---|---|---|---|---|---|---|---|---|---|---|---|---|---|
| Mean daily maximum °F (°C) | 26.2 (−3.2) | 26.2 (−3.2) | 31.5 (−0.3) | 36.8 (2.7) | 45.0 (7.2) | 55.7 (13.2) | 60.6 (15.9) | 58.1 (14.5) | 52.2 (11.2) | 42.4 (5.8) | 32.9 (0.5) | 26.0 (−3.3) | 41.1 (5.1) |
| Daily mean °F (°C) | 15.1 (−9.4) | 14.8 (−9.6) | 19.7 (−6.8) | 24.8 (−4.0) | 33.3 (0.7) | 43.5 (6.4) | 48.5 (9.2) | 46.8 (8.2) | 41.1 (5.1) | 31.6 (−0.2) | 22.2 (−5.4) | 15.2 (−9.3) | 29.7 (−1.3) |
| Mean daily minimum °F (°C) | 3.9 (−15.6) | 3.4 (−15.9) | 7.8 (−13.4) | 12.7 (−10.7) | 21.5 (−5.8) | 31.2 (−0.4) | 36.4 (2.4) | 35.5 (1.9) | 30.0 (−1.1) | 20.8 (−6.2) | 11.5 (−11.4) | 4.4 (−15.3) | 18.3 (−7.6) |
| Average precipitation inches (mm) | 5.96 (151) | 6.74 (171) | 6.42 (163) | 4.91 (125) | 3.67 (93) | 1.42 (36) | 3.44 (87) | 4.80 (122) | 5.04 (128) | 5.92 (150) | 5.99 (152) | 6.44 (164) | 60.75 (1,542) |
Source: PRISM Climate Group

Middle Creek SNOTEL is a weather station on the northern flank of South River Peak, in the Red Mountain Creek Valley. Middle Creek has a subarctic climate (Köppen Dfc).

Climate data for Middle Creek, Colorado, 1991–2020 normals, 1983-2020 extremes: 11250ft (3429m)
| Month | Jan | Feb | Mar | Apr | May | Jun | Jul | Aug | Sep | Oct | Nov | Dec | Year |
|---|---|---|---|---|---|---|---|---|---|---|---|---|---|
| Record high °F (°C) | 64 (18) | 62 (17) | 70 (21) | 69 (21) | 77 (25) | 78 (26) | 81 (27) | 87 (31) | 83 (28) | 82 (28) | 69 (21) | 65 (18) | 87 (31) |
| Mean maximum °F (°C) | 50 (10) | 50 (10) | 54 (12) | 57 (14) | 62 (17) | 71 (22) | 73 (23) | 70 (21) | 67 (19) | 61 (16) | 54 (12) | 49 (9) | 74 (23) |
| Mean daily maximum °F (°C) | 32.4 (0.2) | 33.2 (0.7) | 39.5 (4.2) | 43.6 (6.4) | 50.8 (10.4) | 60.5 (15.8) | 65.3 (18.5) | 62.6 (17.0) | 56.4 (13.6) | 47.4 (8.6) | 38.1 (3.4) | 31.8 (−0.1) | 46.8 (8.2) |
| Daily mean °F (°C) | 18.6 (−7.4) | 19.4 (−7.0) | 25.3 (−3.7) | 30.4 (−0.9) | 39.0 (3.9) | 47.6 (8.7) | 52.3 (11.3) | 50.4 (10.2) | 44.7 (7.1) | 35.4 (1.9) | 25.3 (−3.7) | 18.7 (−7.4) | 33.9 (1.1) |
| Mean daily minimum °F (°C) | 4.9 (−15.1) | 5.7 (−14.6) | 11.1 (−11.6) | 17.1 (−8.3) | 26.9 (−2.8) | 35.0 (1.7) | 39.3 (4.1) | 38.2 (3.4) | 32.9 (0.5) | 23.5 (−4.7) | 12.6 (−10.8) | 5.7 (−14.6) | 21.1 (−6.1) |
| Mean minimum °F (°C) | −14 (−26) | −13 (−25) | −8 (−22) | 0 (−18) | 12 (−11) | 24 (−4) | 33 (1) | 32 (0) | 21 (−6) | 6 (−14) | −10 (−23) | −16 (−27) | −19 (−28) |
| Record low °F (°C) | −26 (−32) | −26 (−32) | −17 (−27) | −10 (−23) | 1 (−17) | 12 (−11) | 22 (−6) | 16 (−9) | 9 (−13) | −10 (−23) | −19 (−28) | −34 (−37) | −34 (−37) |
| Average precipitation inches (mm) | 3.04 (77) | 3.66 (93) | 3.52 (89) | 3.29 (84) | 2.02 (51) | 1.16 (29) | 2.72 (69) | 3.59 (91) | 3.35 (85) | 3.77 (96) | 3.58 (91) | 3.37 (86) | 37.07 (941) |
Source 1: XMACIS2
Source 2: NOAA (Precipitation)

== Historical names ==
- Macomb Peak
- South River Peak – 1906

== See also ==
- List of mountain peaks of North America
  - List of mountain peaks of the United States
    - List of mountain peaks of Colorado
