= Mount Antero =

Mountain in Colorado, United States

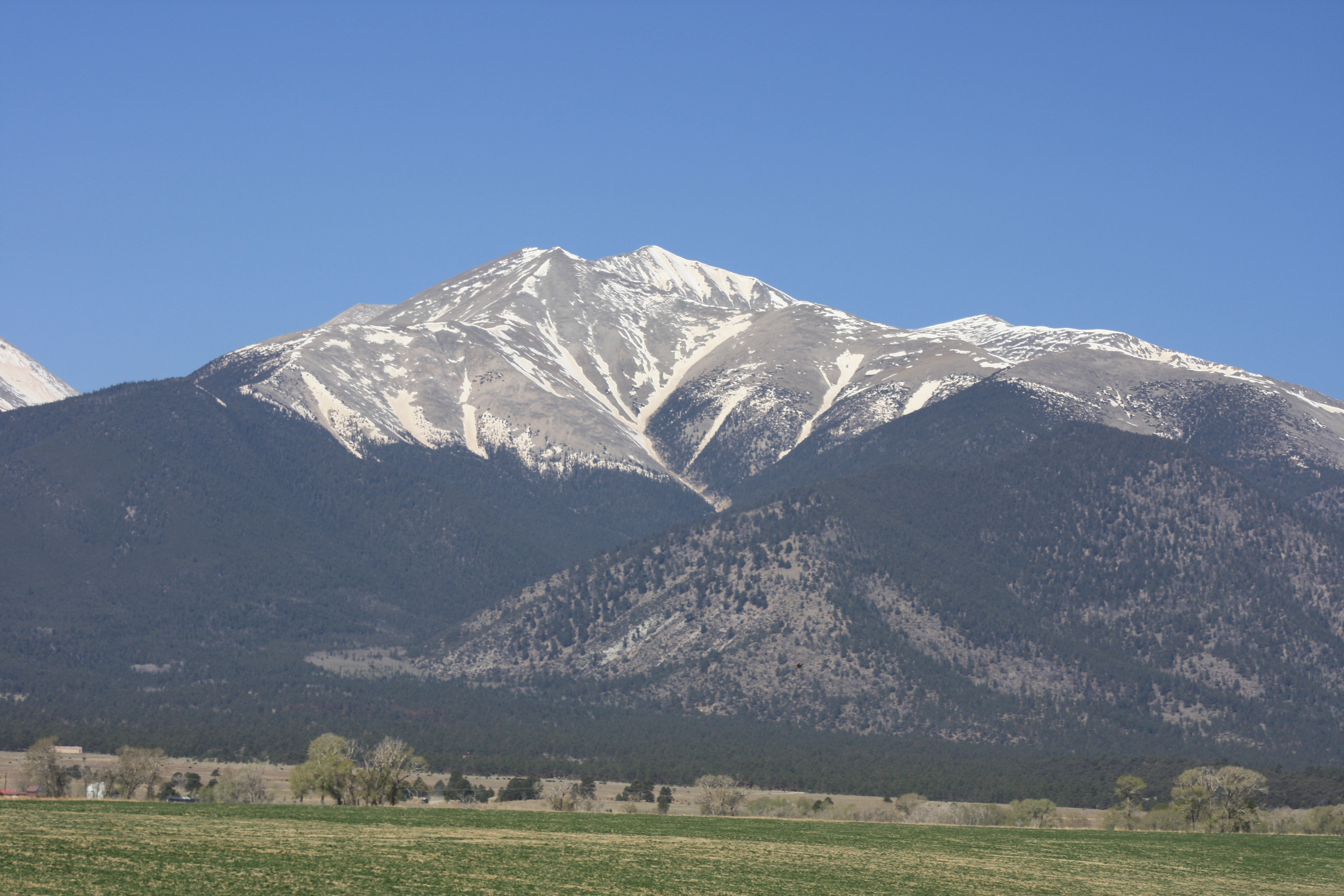
- Mt. Antero seen from U.S. 285.

Highest point
- Elevation: 14,269.0 ft (4,349.2 m); NAPGD2022
- Prominence: 2503 ft (763 m)
- Isolation: 17.67 mi (28.4 km)
- Listing: North America highest peaks 40th; US highest major peaks 26th; Colorado highest major peaks 11th; Colorado fourteeners 11th
- Coordinates: 38°40′27″N 106°14′46″W

Geography
- Location within Colorado
- Location: Chaffee County, Colorado, U.S.
- Parent range: Sawatch Range
- Topo maps: USGS 7.5' topographic map; Mount Antero, Colorado

Climbing
- Easiest route: West Slopes: Hike, class 2

Mount Antero (/ænˈtɛəroʊ/), historically called Antero Peak, is the highest summit of the southern Sawatch Range of the Rocky Mountains of North America. The prominent 14,269-foot (4349.21 m) fourteener is located in San Isabel National Forest, 12.2 miles (19.6 km) southwest by south (bearing 208°) of the Town of Buena Vista in Chaffee County, Colorado, United States. (Note: The elevation of Mount Antero includes an adjustment of +2.071 m (+6.79 ft) from NGVD 29 to NAVD 88.) The mountain is named in honor of Chief Antero of the Uintah band of the Ute people.

== Mountain ==
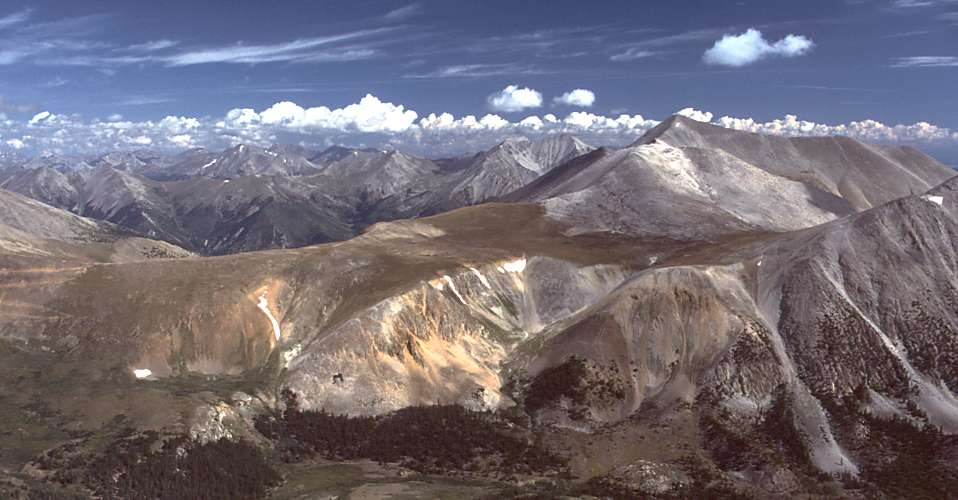
Mt. Antero (at center-right), looking north from the summit of Mt. Shavano

Mount Antero is prized for its gemstone deposits and has one of the highest concentrations of aquamarine in the country. There are several active private mining claims being exploited on Mount Antero and surrounding peaks.

The peak is located due south of the more visually prominent Mount Princeton. Mount Antero is one of the most prominent peaks of the Sawatch Range, rising an impressive 7,200 feet (2,200 m) above the town of Salida, Colorado to the southeast. There are two popular climbing routes on Mount Antero. The generally accepted hiking route is from the east starting at the Browns Creek Trailhead and paralleling Little Browns Creek to its upper reaches where it crosses Forest Road 1A, then following the road near to the summit. The other route, which begins near the ghost town of St. Elmo, follows the same forest road from the north up Baldwin Creek. This route has heavy mining and tourist traffic in fair weather during the summer months.

The peak was surveyed by the Pike Expedition in 1806. A forest service sign at the Browns Creek trailhead commemorates the expedition camp at the eastern base of the peak.

On July 20, 2018, five-time World mountain running Champion Joseph Gray ran the fastest known time (FKT) up Mount Antero from the bottom of FS road 277 to the top of Mount Antero in 1:23:10.

== See also ==
- List of mountain peaks of Colorado
- List of Colorado fourteeners
