= Antora Peak =

Mountain in the American state of Colorado

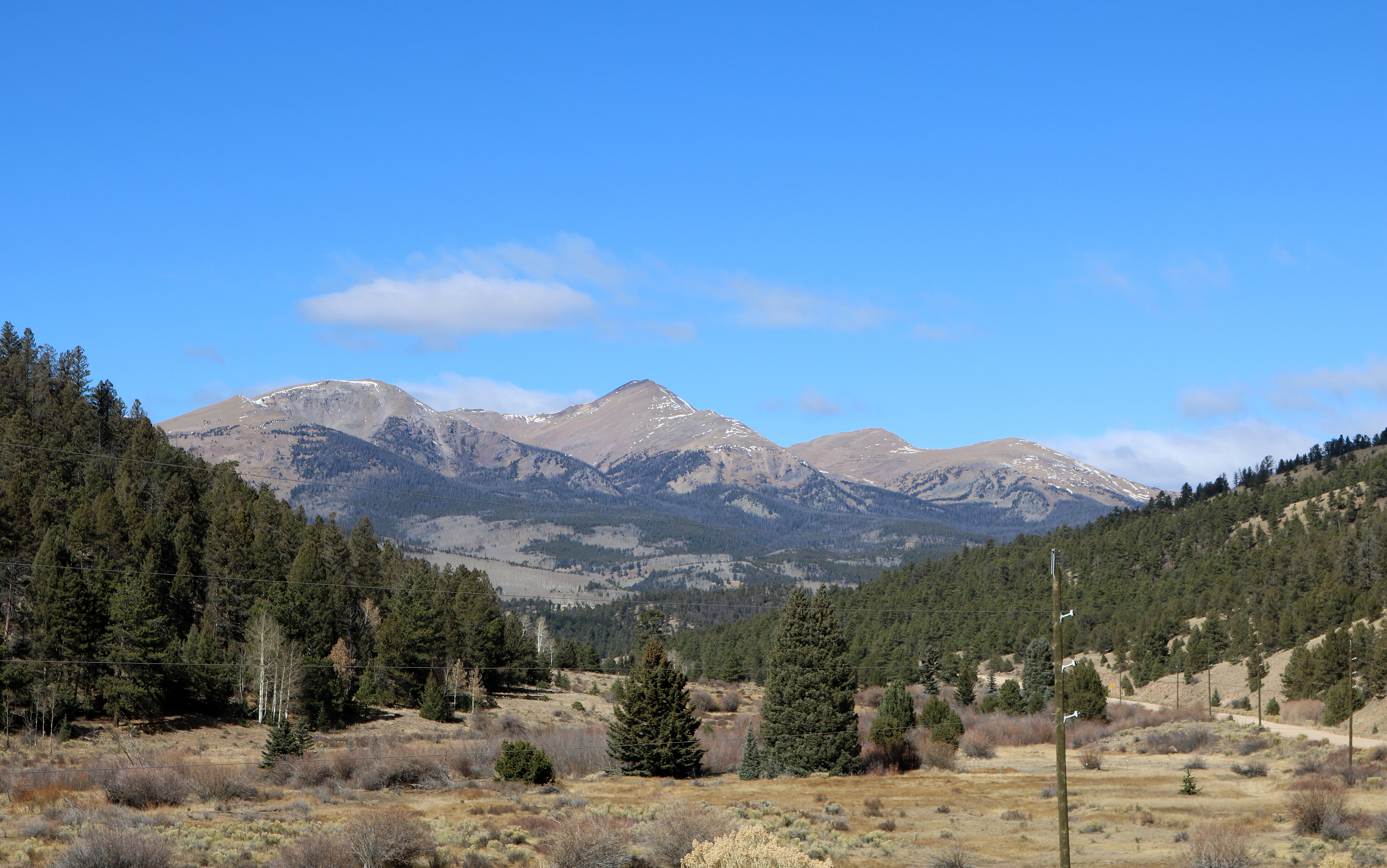
- Antora Peak (center) and other peaks in the Sawatch Range.

Highest point
- Elevation: 13,275 ft (4,046 m)
- Prominence: 2,409 ft (734 m)
- Isolation: 6.75 mi (10.86 km)
- Listing: North America highest peaks 108th; US highest major peaks 89th; Colorado highest major peaks 48th
- Coordinates: 38°19′30″N 106°13′05″W

Geography
- Location within Colorado
- Location: Saguache County, Colorado, U.S.
- Parent range: Sawatch Range
- Topo map(s): USGS 7.5' topographic map Bonanza, Colorado

Antora Peak is a high and prominent mountain summit in the southern Sawatch Range of the Rocky Mountains of North America. The 13,275-foot (4,046 m) thirteener is located in Rio Grande National Forest, 4.6 miles (7.4 km) west-northwest (bearing 295°) of the Town of Bonanza in Saguache County, Colorado, United States.

== Historical names ==
- Antora Mountain
- Antora Peak – 1972
- Antero Mountain
- Antero Peak

== See also ==
- List of mountain peaks of North America
  - List of mountain peaks of the United States
    - List of mountain peaks of Colorado
