= North Mamm Peak =

Mountain in the state of Colorado

- Location within Colorado

Highest point
- Elevation: 11,129 ft (3,392 m)
- Prominence: 3,103 ft (946 m)
- Isolation: 21.20 mi (34.12 km)
- Listing: Colorado prominent summits
- Coordinates: 39°23′11″N 107°51′58″W

Geography
- Location: Garfield County, Colorado, U.S.
- Parent range: Grand Mesa
- Topo map(s): USGS 7.5' topographic map North Mamm Peak, Colorado

North Mamm Peak is a prominent mountain summit on Grand Mesa in the Rocky Mountains of North America. The 11,129-foot (3,392 m) peak is located in White River National Forest, 11.6 miles (18.6 km) south-southwest (bearing 205°) of the Town of Rifle in Garfield County, Colorado, United States.

== Historical names ==
- North Mam Peak
- North Mamm Peak – 1963

== See also ==
- List of Colorado mountain ranges
- List of Colorado mountain summits
  - List of Colorado fourteeners
  - List of Colorado 4000 meter prominent summits
  - List of the most prominent summits of Colorado
- List of Colorado county high points
