= Castle Peak (Sawatch Range) =

Mountain summit in Colorado, United States

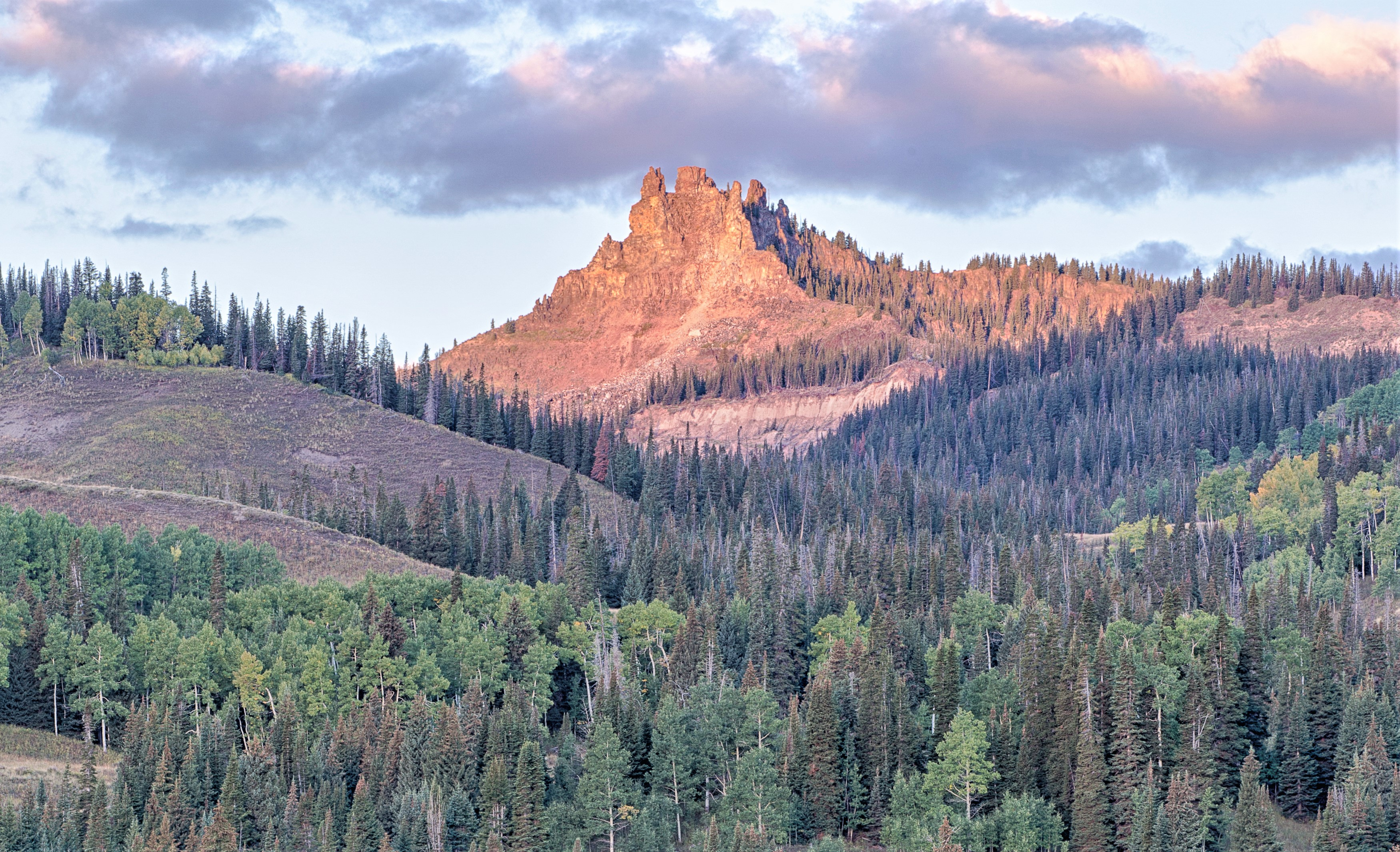

Highest point
- Elevation: 11,305 ft (3,446 m)
- Prominence: 3,040 ft (927 m)
- Isolation: 16.70 mi (26.88 km)
- Listing: Colorado prominent summits
- Coordinates: 39°46′23″N 106°50′04″W

Geography
- Location within Colorado
- Location: Eagle County, Colorado, U.S.
- Parent range: Sawatch Range
- Topo map(s): USGS 7.5' topographic map Castle Peak, Colorado

Castle Peak is a prominent mountain summit in the northern Sawatch Range of the Rocky Mountains of North America. The 11,305-foot (3,446 m) peak is located 9.6 miles (15.5 km) north (bearing 355°) of the Town of Eagle in Eagle County, Colorado, United States.

== See also ==
- List of Colorado mountain ranges
- List of Colorado mountain summits
  - List of Colorado fourteeners
  - List of Colorado 4000 meter prominent summits
  - List of the most prominent summits of Colorado
- List of Colorado county high points
