= Diamond Peak (Colorado) =

Mountain in the state of Colorado

- Location within Colorado

Highest point
- Elevation: 9,665 ft (2,946 m)
- Prominence: 2,845 ft (867 m)
- Isolation: 29.67 mi (47.75 km)
- Coordinates: 40°57′01″N 108°52′41″W

Geography
- Location: Moffat County, Colorado, U.S.
- Topo map(s): USGS 7.5' topographic map Beaver Basin, Colorado

Diamond Peak is a prominent mountain summit in the Green River Basin of the U.S. state of Colorado. The 9,665-foot (2,946 m) peak is located 51.0 miles (82.1 km) northwest by west (bearing 306°) of the community of Maybell in Moffat County, Colorado, United States.

== Mountain ==
Diamond Peak was the scene of a diamond salting scheme known as the Diamond hoax of 1872. It was solved by Clarence King, the noted geologist and surveyor.

There are two other "Diamond Peaks" in Colorado, one in Routt County and the other in Jackson County.

== See also ==
- List of Colorado mountain ranges
- List of Colorado mountain summits
  - List of Colorado fourteeners
  - List of Colorado 4000 meter prominent summits
  - List of the most prominent summits of Colorado
- List of Colorado county high points
