= Black Mountain (Moffat County, Colorado) =

Mountain in the American state of Colorado

- Location within Colorado

Highest point
- Elevation: 10,865 ft (3,312 m)
- Prominence: 2,440 ft (744 m)
- Isolation: 16.40 mi (26.39 km)
- Listing: Colorado county high points 42nd
- Coordinates: 40°47′29″N 107°23′15″W

Geography
- Location: High point of Moffat County, Colorado, United States
- Parent range: Elkhead Mountains
- Topo map(s): USGS 7.5' topographic map Freeman Reservoir, Colorado

Climbing
- Easiest route: hike

Black Mountain is a prominent mountain summit in the Elkhead Mountains range of the Rocky Mountains of North America. The 10,865-foot (3,312 m) peak is located in Routt National Forest, 20.9 miles (33.6 km) north-northeast (bearing 25°) of the City of Craig in Moffat County, Colorado, United States. Black Mountain is the highest point in Moffat County.

== Historical names ==
- Black Mountain
- Welba Peak

== See also ==
- List of mountain peaks of Colorado
  - List of the most prominent summits of Colorado
  - List of Colorado county high points
