= Rio Grande Pyramid =

Summit in Colorado, US

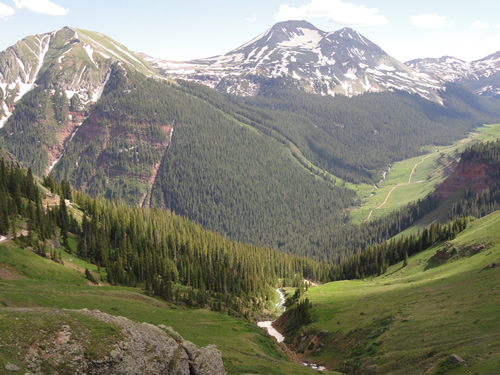

Highest point
- Elevation: 13,827 ft (4,214 m)
- Prominence: 1,881 ft (573 m)
- Isolation: 10.76 mi (17.32 km)
- Listing: North America highest peaks 74th; US highest major peaks 56th; Colorado highest major peaks 30th
- Coordinates: 37°40′47″N 107°23′33″W

Geography
- Location within Colorado
- Location: Hinsdale County, Colorado, U.S.
- Parent range: San Juan Mountains
- Topo map(s): USGS 7.5' topographic map Rio Grande Pyramid, Colorado

Climbing
- First ascent: 1874 by the Wheeler Survey
- Easiest route: Hike (class 2)

Rio Grande Pyramid, elevation 13,827 feet, is a summit in the San Juan Mountains of southwest Colorado. The peak is located in the Weminuche Wilderness of the San Juan National Forest near the headwaters of its namesake, the Rio Grande. It lies on an east-west trending section of the Continental Divide about 25 miles south of the Hinsdale County seat, Lake City.

Rio Grande Pyramid in spring conditions as viewed from the northeast.

== See also ==
- List of mountain peaks of North America
  - List of mountain peaks of the United States
    - List of mountain peaks of Colorado
