= Tower Mountain (Colorado) =

Mountain in Colorado, United States

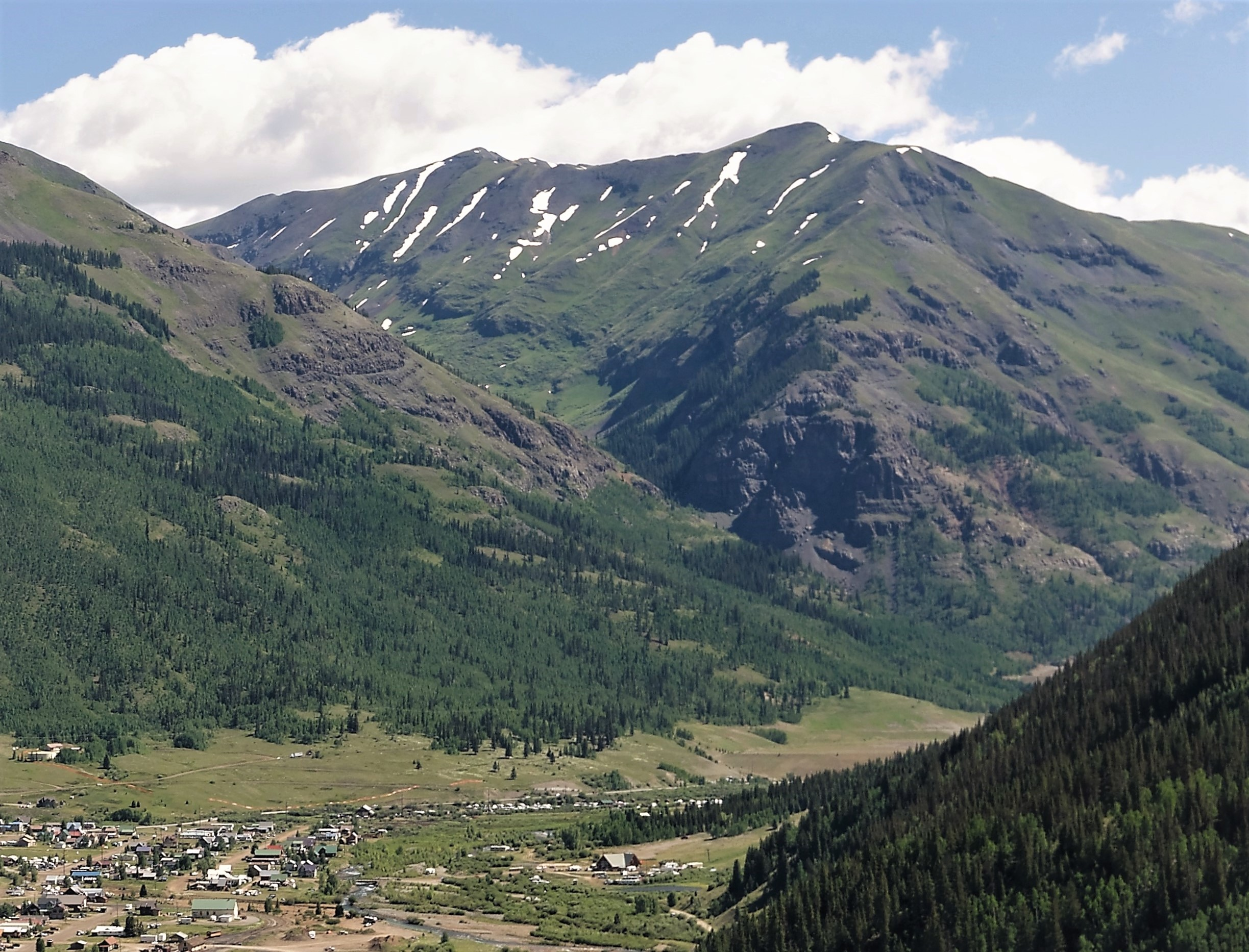
- Tower Mountain (left) and Macomber Peak (right̟) rise above Silverton

Highest point
- Elevation: 13,558 ft (4,132 m)
- Prominence: 1,652 ft (504 m)
- Parent peak: Niagara Peak
- Isolation: 4.88 mi (7.85 km)
- Listing: North America highest peaks 91st; US highest major peaks 74th; Colorado highest major peaks 38th
- Coordinates: 37°51′26″N 107°37′23″W

Geography
- Location within Colorado
- Location: San Juan County, Colorado, U.S.
- Parent range: San Juan Mountains
- Topo map(s): USGS 7.5' topographic map Howardsville, Colorado

Climbing
- Easiest route: class 2 hiking

Tower Mountain, elevation 13,558 ft (4,132 m), is a summit located northeast of Silverton, Colorado.

== Description ==
Tower Mountain is located six miles (9.7 km) west of the Continental Divide in the San Juan Mountains which are a subrange of the Rocky Mountains. Precipitation runoff from the mountain drains into tributaries of the Animas River. Topographic relief is significant as the summit rises 3,750 feet (1,140 meters) above the Animas River in two miles (3.2 km).

== Climate ==
According to the Köppen climate classification system, Tower Mountain is located in an alpine subarctic climate zone with long, cold, snowy winters, and cool to warm summers. Due to its altitude, it receives precipitation all year, as snow in winter and as thunderstorms in summer, with a dry period in late spring.

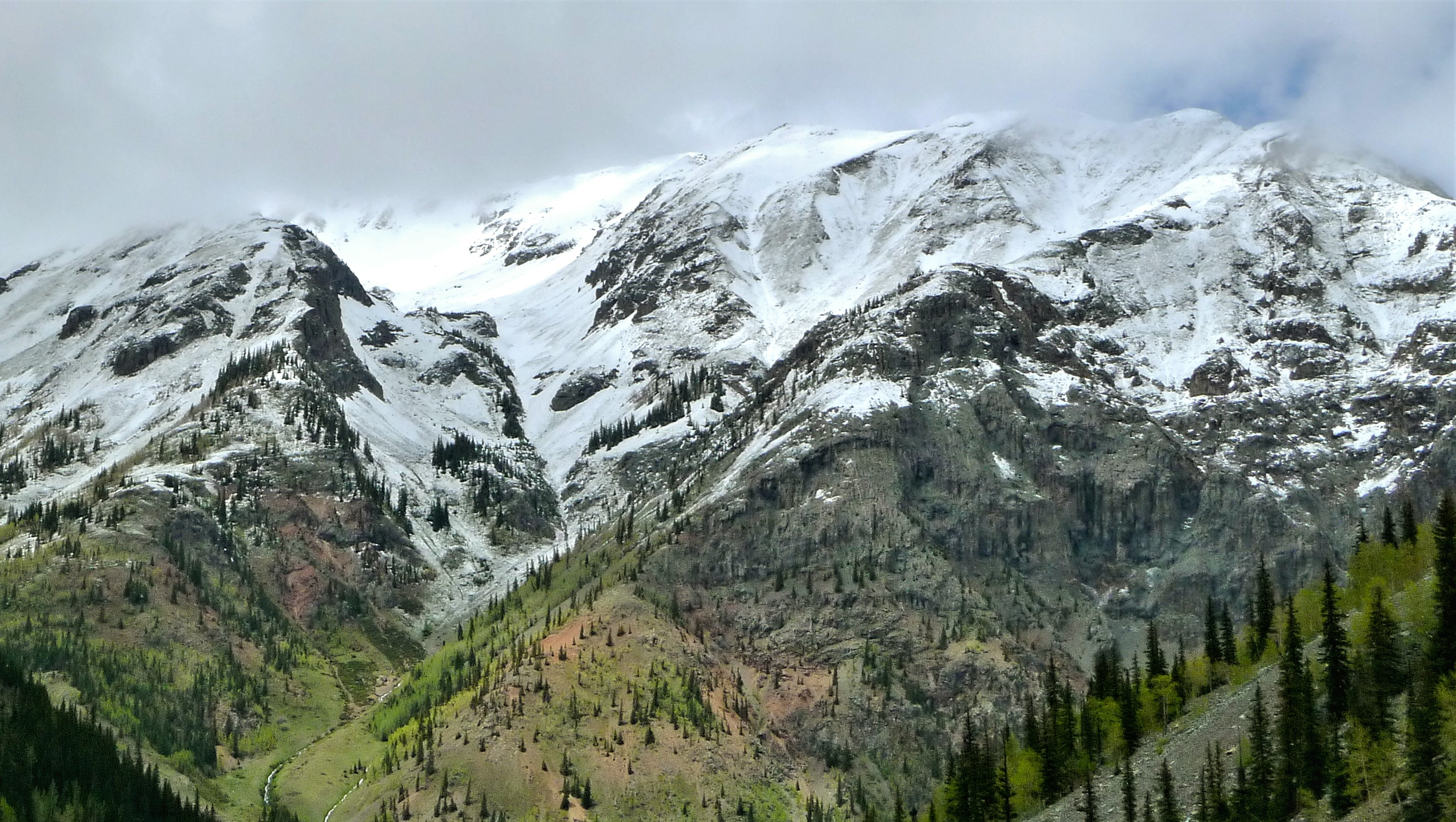
Southeast aspect of Tower Mountain

== See also ==
- List of mountain peaks of North America
  - List of mountain peaks of the United States
    - List of mountain peaks of Colorado
