= Zenobia Peak =

Mountain in the state of Colorado

- Location within Colorado

Highest point
- Elevation: 9,022 ft (2,750 m)
- Prominence: 2,395 ft (730 m)
- Isolation: 22.82 mi (36.73 km)
- Listing: Colorado prominent summits
- Coordinates: 40°36′26″N 108°52′12″W

Geography
- Location: Moffat County, Colorado, U.S.
- Parent range: Uinta Mountains
- Topo map(s): USGS 7.5' topographic map Zenobia Peak, Colorado

Climbing
- Easiest route: hike

Zenobia Peak, elevation 9,022 ft (2,750 m), is the highest summit in Dinosaur National Monument of Moffat County, Colorado.

== See also ==
- List of Colorado mountain ranges
- List of Colorado mountain summits
  - List of Colorado fourteeners
  - List of Colorado 4000 meter prominent summits
  - List of the most prominent summits of Colorado
- List of Colorado county high points
