= Culebra Peak =

Mountain in Colorado, United States

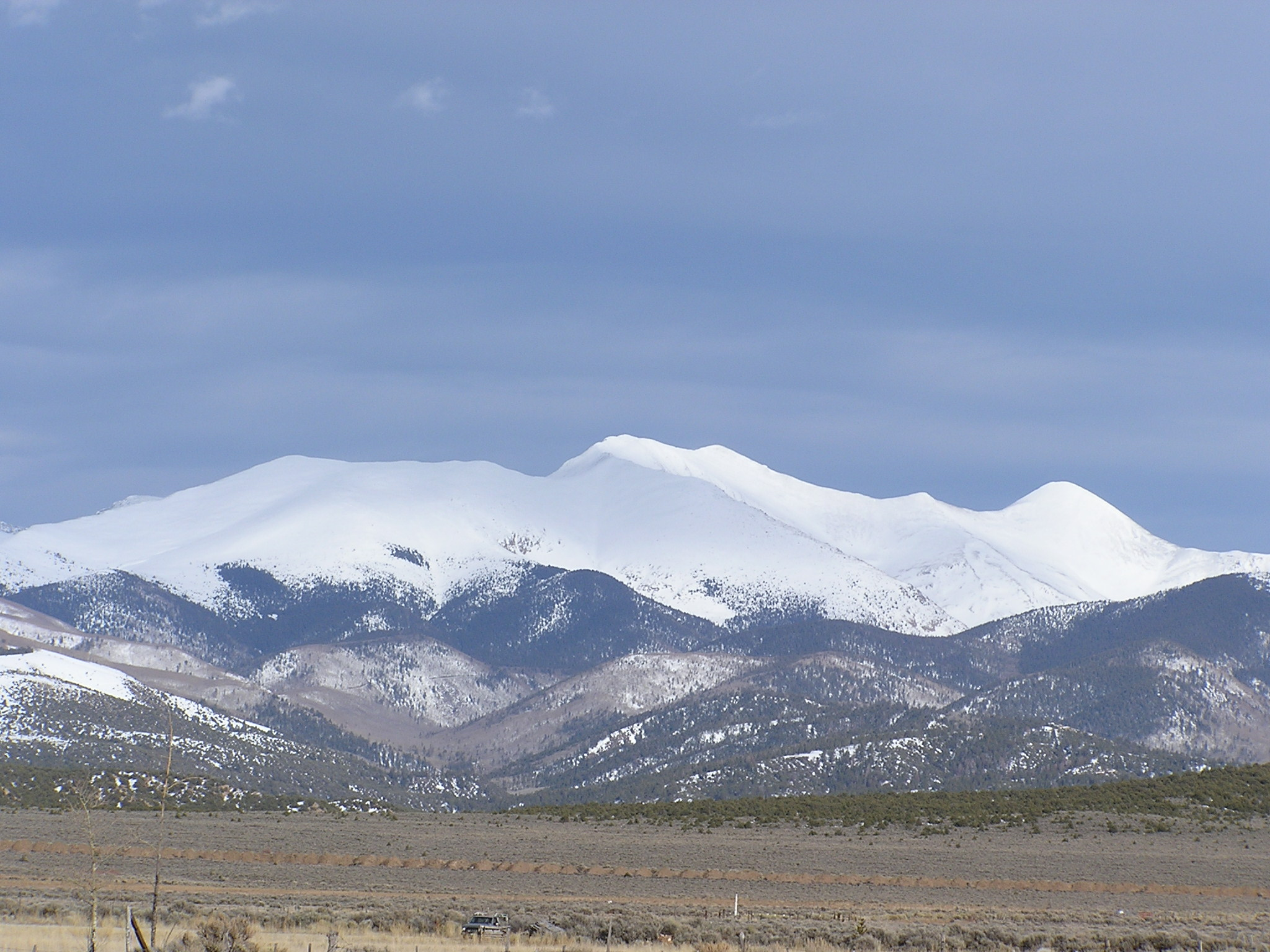
- Culebra Peak viewed from south of San Luis.

Highest point
- Elevation: 14,053.2 ft (4,283.4 m); NAPGD2022
- Prominence: 4827 ft (1471 m)
- Isolation: 35.4 mi (56.9 km)
- Listing: North America highest peaks 57th; US highest major peaks 43rd; Colorado highest major peaks 23rd; Colorado fourteeners 41st
- Coordinates: 37°07′20″N 105°11′08″W

Geography
- Location within Colorado
- Location: Costilla County, Colorado, U.S.
- Parent range: Sangre de Cristo Mountains, Highest summit of the Culebra Range
- Topo map(s): USGS 7.5' topographic map Culebra Peak, Colorado

Climbing
- Easiest route: Northwest Ridge: Hike, class 2

Culebra Peak (Spanish for "snake") is the highest summit of the Culebra Range of the Sangre de Cristo Mountains of the Rocky Mountains of North America. The 14,053.2-foot (4,283 m) fourteener is located on private land, 14.2 miles (22.8 km) east-southeast (bearing 113°) of San Luis in Costilla County, Colorado, United States. Culebra Peak is the southernmost fourteener in the Rocky Mountains.

== Geography ==
Access is limited, and a fee ($150 per person as of Summer 2020) is charged to climb the peak. Ownership of and access to the land, both for recreational and other activities, have been controversial issues for many years, involving multiple lawsuits and occasional violence. In 2017 the ranch the peak is in was offered for sale for $105 million, and sold later that year for an undisclosed amount.

Culebra is the fourth-most topographically prominent peak in the state, due to its separation from other peaks by the relatively low La Veta Pass.

According to the current owners of Cielo Vista Ranch, within which the peak is located, Culebra Peak is the highest privately owned peak in the world.

=== Climate ===
Climate data for Culebra Peak 37.1275 N, 105.1926 W, Elevation: 13,491 ft (4,112 m) (1991–2020 normals)
Month	Jan	Feb	Mar	Apr	May	Jun	Jul	Aug	Sep	Oct	Nov	Dec	Year
Mean daily maximum °F (°C)	24.0 (−4.4)	23.6 (−4.7)	28.5 (−1.9)	35.2 (1.8)	43.5 (6.4)	54.7 (12.6)	58.4 (14.7)	56.4 (13.6)	50.4 (10.2)	40.6 (4.8)	30.8 (−0.7)	24.5 (−4.2)	39.2 (4.0)
Daily mean °F (°C)	12.0 (−11.1)	11.5 (−11.4)	15.9 (−8.9)	21.6 (−5.8)	30.0 (−1.1)	40.1 (4.5)	44.4 (6.9)	43.0 (6.1)	37.3 (2.9)	28.1 (−2.2)	19.3 (−7.1)	12.9 (−10.6)	26.3 (−3.1)
Mean daily minimum °F (°C)	0.1 (−17.7)	−0.6 (−18.1)	3.4 (−15.9)	7.9 (−13.4)	16.5 (−8.6)	25.5 (−3.6)	30.3 (−0.9)	29.6 (−1.3)	24.2 (−4.3)	15.6 (−9.1)	7.9 (−13.4)	1.2 (−17.1)	13.5 (−10.3)
Average precipitation inches (mm)	2.63 (67)	2.98 (76)	3.73 (95)	4.26 (108)	2.99 (76)	1.37 (35)	4.52 (115)	4.37 (111)	2.86 (73)	2.33 (59)	2.90 (74)	2.79 (71)	37.73 (960)
Source: PRISM Climate Group

== See also ==
- List of mountain peaks of North America
- List of mountain peaks of the United States
- List of mountain peaks of Colorado
- List of Colorado fourteeners
