= Jacque Peak =

Mountain in Colorado, United States

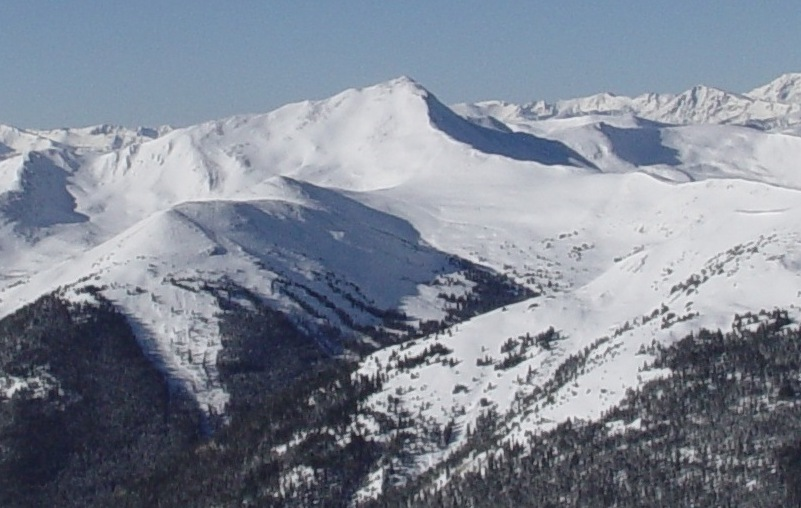
- Jacque Peak viewed from Peak 8

Highest point
- Elevation: 13,211 ft (4,027 m)
- Prominence: 2,065 ft (629 m)
- Isolation: 4.52 mi (7.27 km)
- Listing: North America highest peaks 112th; US highest major peaks 93rd; Colorado highest major peaks 51st
- Coordinates: 39°27′16″N 106°11′51″W

Geography
- Location within Colorado
- Location: Summit County, Colorado, U.S.
- Parent range: Gore Range
- Topo map(s): USGS 7.5' topographic map Copper Mountain, Colorado

Jacque Peak is a high and prominent mountain summit in the Gore Range of the Rocky Mountains of North America. The 13,211-foot (4,027 m) thirteener is located in the White River National Forest, 1.6 miles (2.5 km) south by east (bearing 173°) of the resort community of Copper Mountain in Summit County, Colorado, United States.

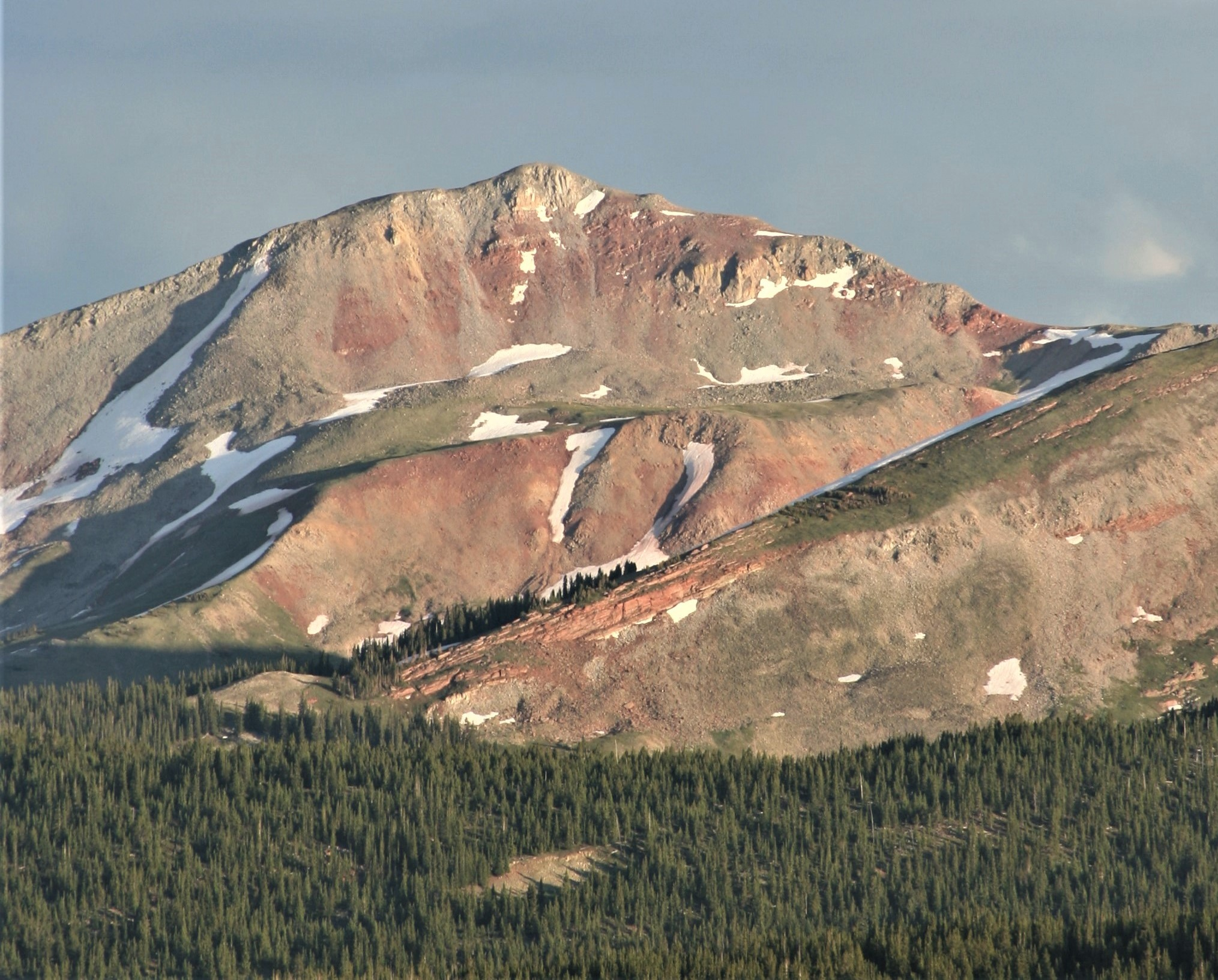
North aspect of Jacque Peak from Vail Pass

== See also ==
- List of mountain peaks of North America
  - List of mountain peaks of the United States
    - List of mountain peaks of Colorado
