= Mount Jackson (Colorado) =

Mountain in Colorado, United States

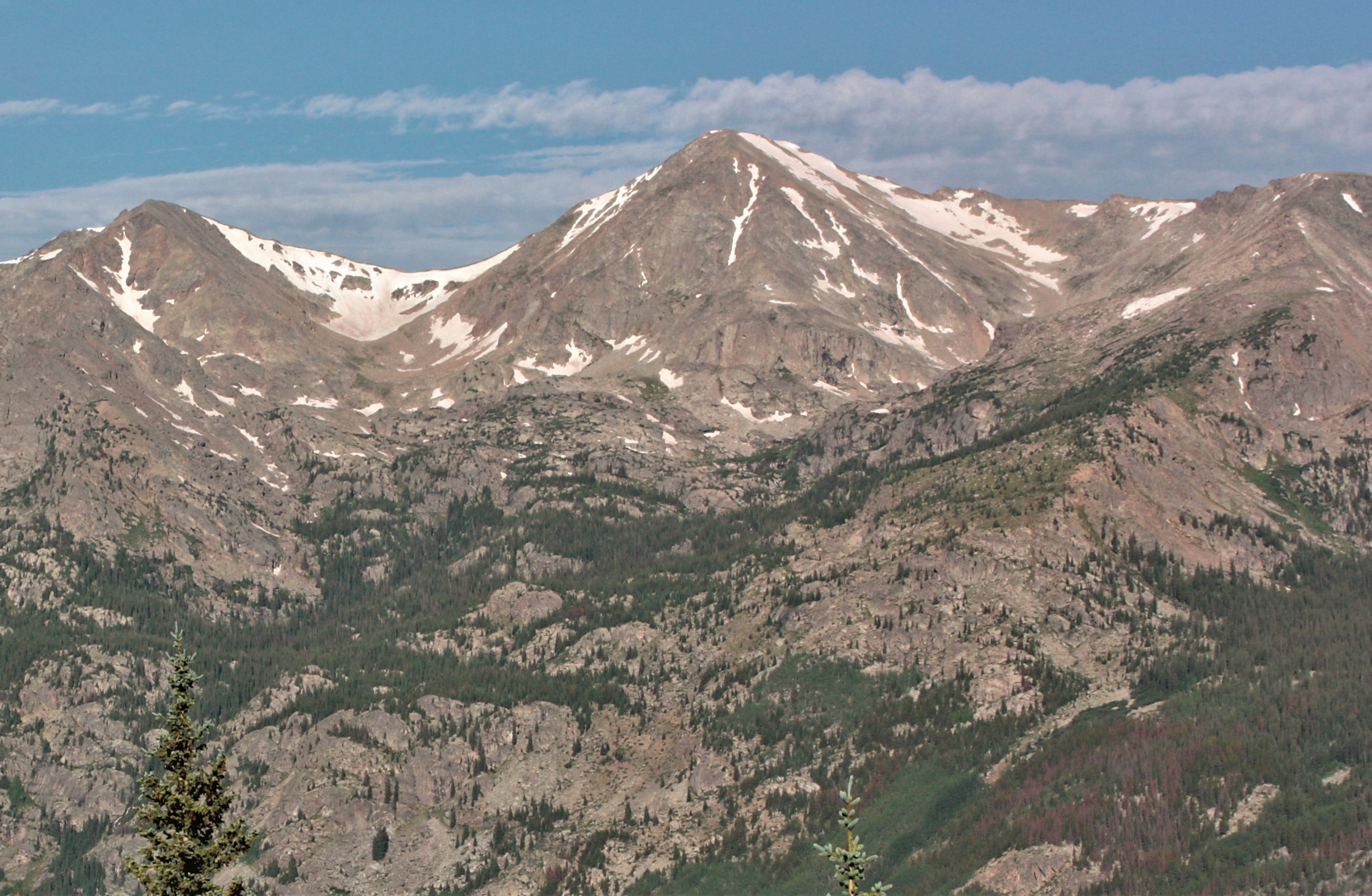
- East aspect

Highest point
- Elevation: 13,676 ft (4,168 m)
- Prominence: 1,810 ft (552 m)
- Isolation: 3.21 mi (5.17 km)
- Listing: North America highest peaks 84th; US highest major peaks 67th; Colorado highest major peaks 33rd
- Coordinates: 39°29′07″N 106°32′12″W

Geography
- Location within Colorado
- Location: Eagle County, Colorado, U.S.
- Parent range: Sawatch Range
- Topo map(s): USGS 7.5' topographic map Mount Jackson, Colorado

Mount Jackson is a high and prominent mountain summit in the northern Sawatch Range of the Rocky Mountains of North America. The 13,676-foot (4,168 m) thirteener is located in the Holy Cross Wilderness of White River National Forest, 9.0 miles (14.5 km) west-southwest (bearing 247°) of the Town of Minturn in Eagle County, Colorado, United States. The mountain was named in honor of photographer William Henry Jackson, who accompanied the Hayden Survey in the 1870s.

== See also ==
- List of mountain peaks of North America
  - List of mountain peaks of the United States
    - List of mountain peaks of Colorado
