= Mount Oso (Colorado) =

Mountain in the American state of Colorado

- Location within Colorado

Highest point
- Elevation: 13,690 ft (4,173 m)
- Prominence: 1,664 ft (507 m)
- Isolation: 5.41 mi (8.71 km)
- Listing: North America highest peaks 83rd; US highest major peaks 65th; Colorado highest major peak 32nd
- Coordinates: 37°36′26″N 107°29′37″W

Geography
- Location: La Plata County, Colorado, U.S.
- Parent range: San Juan Mountains
- Topo map(s): USGS 7.5' topographic map Emerald Lake, Colorado

Mount Oso is a high and prominent mountain summit in the San Juan Mountains range of the Rocky Mountains of North America. The 13,690-foot (4,173 m) peak is located in the Weminuche Wilderness of San Juan National Forest, 30.8 miles (49.5 km) northeast (bearing 42°) of the City of Durango in La Plata County, Colorado, United States.

== Historical names ==
- Hunchback
- Mount Oso – 1906

== See also ==
- List of mountain peaks of North America
  - List of mountain peaks of the United States
    - List of mountain peaks of Colorado
