= Archuleta Mesa =

Mountain in Colorado/New Mexico, United States

- Location within Colorado Location within New Mexico

Highest point
- Elevation: 9,229 ft (2,813 m)
- Listing: Mountains of Colorado
- Coordinates: 37°01′25″N 106°57′47″W

Geography
- Country: United States
- States: Colorado and New Mexico
- Counties: Archuleta County and Rio Arriba County
- Parent range: San Juan Mountains

Archuleta Mesa, known informally as Alien Mountain, is a mountain summit situated within the San Juan Mountain Range on the Colorado-New Mexico border. It has been the subject of an alien conspiracy theory, and has gained national attention as a result.

== Location ==
The mesa is located in the southern portions of the San Juan Mountain Range, located in southwestern Colorado. It is bounded to the east by Edith, Colorado and Felix Spring to the east. The mountain ridge runs from north-to-south. To the west of the mountain is the Montezuma Mesa, which is bounded by the San Juan River, where the range gets its name. Dulce, New Mexico is located on the mesa.

== History ==
=== 1996 wildfire ===
In mid-1996, a large wildfire burned within the mesa boundary, scarring large amounts of vegetation on the mesa.

== Wildlife ==
Several tree species are present on the slopes and top of the mesa, including ponderosa pine and Colorado fir. Fungi, including Armillaria ostoyae and Heterobasidion annosum, have also been documented on the mesa.
