= List of the major 3000-meter summits of the Rocky Mountains =

List of the major 3000-meter mountain summits of the Rocky Mountains of North America

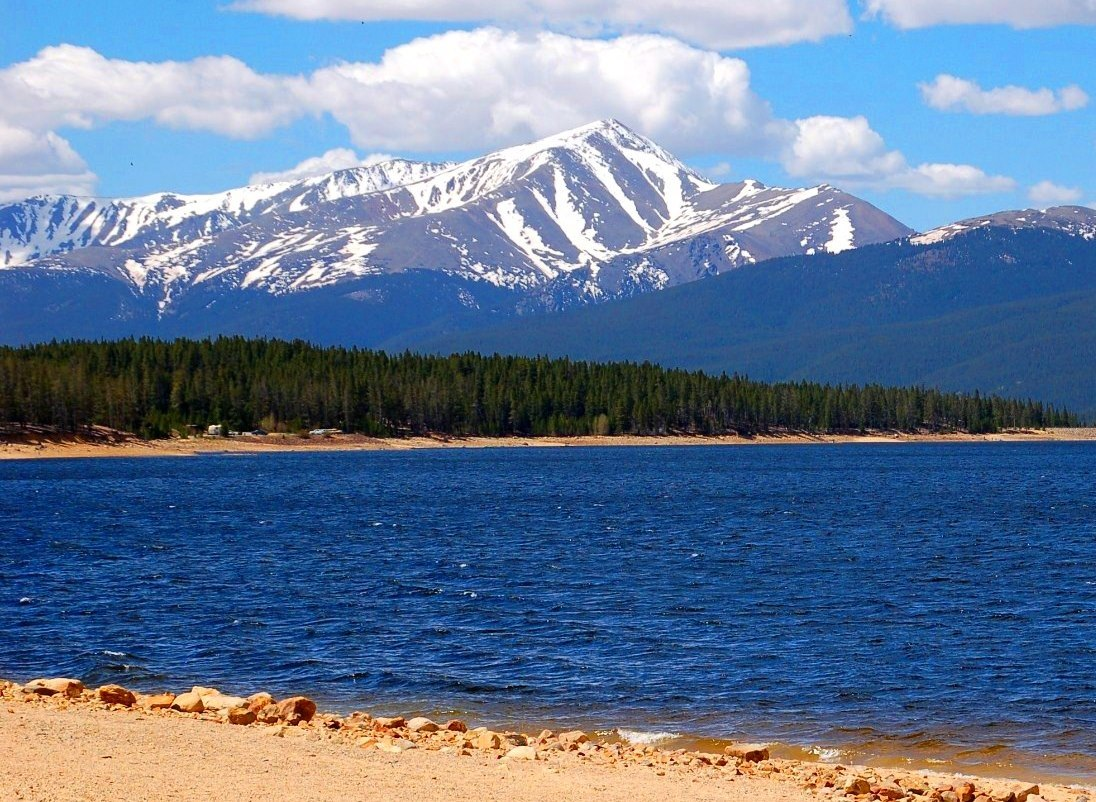
Mount Elbert in the Sawatch Range is the highest summit of the Rocky Mountains and the U.S. State of Colorado.

The following sortable table comprises the 184 peaks of the Rocky Mountains of North America with at least 3000 meters (9843 feet) of elevation and at least 500 meters (1640 feet) of topographic prominence.

The summit of a mountain or hill may be measured in three principal ways:

1. The topographic elevation of a summit measures the height of the summit above a geodetic sea level.
2. The topographic prominence of a summit is a measure of how high the summit rises above its surroundings.
3. The topographic isolation (or radius of dominance) of a summit measures how far the summit lies from its nearest point of equal elevation.

In the Rocky Mountains, 62 major summits exceed 4000 meters (13,123 feet) elevation, 137 exceed 3500 meters (11,483 feet), and the following 184 exceed 3000 meters (9843 feet) elevation.

== Major 3000-meter summits ==
Of the 401 major 3000-meter summits of greater North America, the following 184 (or 46%) are in the Rocky Mountains.

Of these 184 major 3000-meter summits of the Rocky Mountains, 116 are located in Colorado, 17 in Wyoming, 15 in Montana, 12 in Alberta, 11 in British Columbia, seven in New Mexico, five in Idaho, and four in Utah. Three of these summits lie on the Great Divide between Alberta and British Columbia. The 30 highest major summits of the Rocky Mountains are all located in Colorado.

The 184 summits of the Rocky Mountains with at least 3000 meters of topographic elevation and 500 meters of topographic prominence
| Rank | Mountain Peak | State or Province | Mountain Range | Elevation | Prominence | Isolation | Location |
|---|---|---|---|---|---|---|---|
| 1 | Mount Elbert (Note: The summit of Mount Elbert is the highest point of the U.S. State of Colorado, the Rocky Mountains of North America, and the entire Mississippi River drainage basin.) | Colorado | Sawatch Range | 14,440 ft 4401.2 m | 9,093 ft 2772 m | 671 mi 1,079 km | 39.1178°N 106.4454°W |
| 2 | Mount Massive (Note: Mount Massive is the second highest major summit of the Rocky Mountains.) (Note: The elevation of Mount Massive includes an adjustment of +2.087 m (6.85 ft) from NGVD 29 to NAVD 88.) | Colorado | Sawatch Range | 14,424 ft 4396.3 m | 1,978 ft 603 m | 5.1 mi 8.21 km | 39.1875°N 106.4757°W |
| 3 | Mount Harvard (Note: The summit of Mount Harvard is the highest point of the Collegiate Peaks.) (Note: Mount Harvard is the southernmost and easternmost summit of its elevation in the Rocky Mountains.) | Colorado | Sawatch Range | 4395.6 m 14,421 ft | 719 m 2,360 ft | 24 km 14.92 mi | 38.9244°N 106.3207°W |
| 4 | Blanca Peak (Note: The summit of Blanca Peak is the highest point of the Sangre de Cristo Mountains and the entire Rio Grande drainage basin.) (Note: Blanca Peak is the southernmost ultra-prominent summit of the Rocky Mountains.) (Note: The elevation of Blanca Peak includes an adjustment of +1.755 m (5.76 ft) from NGVD 29 to NAVD 88.) | Colorado | Sangre de Cristo Mountains | 4374 m 14,351 ft | 1623 m 5,326 ft | 166.4 km 103.4 mi | 37.5775°N 105.4856°W |
| 5 | La Plata Peak (Note: The elevation of La Plata Peak includes an adjustment of +1.983 m (6.51 ft) from NGVD 29 to NAVD 88.) | Colorado | Sawatch Range | 4372 m 14,343 ft | 560 m 1,836 ft | 10.11 km 6.28 mi | 39.0294°N 106.4729°W |
| 6 | Uncompahgre Peak (Note: The summit of Uncompahgre Peak is the highest point of the San Juan Mountains and the entire Gulf of California drainage basin.) (Note: Uncompahgre Peak is the westernmost summit of its elevation in the Rocky Mountains.) | Colorado | San Juan Mountains | 4365 m 14,321 ft | 1304 m 4,277 ft | 136.8 km 85 mi | 38.0717°N 107.4621°W |
| 7 | Crestone Peak (Note: The summit of Crestone Peak is the highest point of the Crestones.) (Note: The elevation of Crestone Peak includes an adjustment of +1.76 m (5.77 ft) from NGVD 29 to NAVD 88.) | Colorado | Sangre de Cristo Range | 4359 m 14,300 ft | 1388 m 4,554 ft | 44 km 27.4 mi | 37.9669°N 105.5855°W |
| 8 | Mount Lincoln (Note: The summit of Mount Lincoln is the highest point of the Mosquito Range and the entire Missouri River drainage basin.) (Note: Mount Lincoln is the northernmost summit of its elevation in the Rocky Mountains.) | Colorado | Mosquito Range | 4356.5 m 14,293 ft | 1177 m 3,862 ft | 36.2 km 22.5 mi | 39.3515°N 106.1116°W |
| 9 | Castle Peak (Note: The summit of Castle Peak is the highest point of the Elk Mountains.) | Colorado | Elk Mountains | 4352.2 m 14,279 ft | 721 m 2,365 ft | 33.6 km 20.9 mi | 39.0097°N 106.8614°W |
| 10 | Grays Peak (Note: The summit of Grays Peak is the highest point of the Front Range and the Continental Divide in North America.) (Note: Grays Peak is the northernmost summit of its elevation in the Rocky Mountains.) | Colorado | Front Range | 4352 m 14,278 ft | 844 m 2,770 ft | 40.2 km 25 mi | 39.6339°N 105.8176°W |
| 11 | Mount Antero (Note: The summit of Mount Antero is the highest point of the southern Sawatch Range.) | Colorado | Sawatch Range | 4351.4 m 14,276 ft | 763 m 2,503 ft | 28.4 km 17.67 mi | 38.6741°N 106.2462°W |
| 12 | Mount Evans (Note: The summit elevation of Mount Evans includes a vertical offset of +1.798 m (5.9 ft) from the station benchmark.) | Colorado | Front Range | 4350 m 14,271 ft | 844 m 2,770 ft | 15.76 km 9.79 mi | 39.5883°N 105.6438°W |
| 13 | Longs Peak (Note: The summit of Longs Peak is the highest point of the northern Front Range.) (Note: Longs Peak is the northernmost 14,000-foot (4267-meter) summit of the Rocky Mountains.) | Colorado | Front Range | 4346 m 14,259 ft | 896 m 2,940 ft | 70.2 km 43.6 mi | 40.2550°N 105.6151°W |
| 14 | Mount Wilson (Note: The summit of Mount Wilson is the highest point of the San Miguel Mountains.) (Note: Mount Wilson is the westernmost summit of its elevation in the Rocky Mountains.) (Note: The elevation of Mount Wilson includes an adjustment of +1.899 m (6.23 ft) from NGVD 29 to NAVD 88.) | Colorado | San Miguel Mountains | 4344 m 14,252 ft | 1227 m 4,024 ft | 53.1 km 33 mi | 37.8391°N 107.9916°W |
| 15 | Mount Princeton | Colorado | Sawatch Range | 4329.3 m 14,204 ft | 664 m 2,177 ft | 8.36 km 5.19 mi | 38.7492°N 106.2424°W |
| 16 | Mount Yale | Colorado | Sawatch Range | 4328.2 m 14,200 ft | 578 m 1,896 ft | 8.93 km 5.55 mi | 38.8442°N 106.3138°W |
| 17 | Maroon Peak | Colorado | Elk Mountains | 4317 m 14,163 ft | 712 m 2,336 ft | 12.97 km 8.06 mi | 39.0708°N 106.9890°W |
| 18 | Mount Sneffels (Note: The summit of Mount Sneffels is the highest point of the Sneffels Range.) | Colorado | Sneffels Range | 4315.4 m 14,158 ft | 930 m 3,050 ft | 25.3 km 15.71 mi | 38.0038°N 107.7923°W |
| 19 | Capitol Peak (Note: The elevation of Capitol Peak includes an adjustment of +1.991 m (6.53 ft) from NGVD 29 to NAVD 88.) | Colorado | Elk Mountains | 4309 m 14,137 ft | 533 m 1,750 ft | 11.98 km 7.44 mi | 39.1503°N 107.0829°W |
| 20 | Pikes Peak (Note: Pikes Peak is the easternmost 14,000-foot (4267-meter) summit and ultra-prominent summit of the Rocky Mountains. Pikes Peak was the inspiration for the lyrics of America the Beautiful.) | Colorado | Front Range | 4302.31 m 14,115 ft | 1686 m 5,530 ft | 97.6 km 60.6 mi | 38.8405°N 105.0442°W |
| 21 | Windom Peak (Note: The summit of Windom Peak is the highest point of the Needle Mountains.) (Note: Mount Eolus may be higher than Windom Peak.) (Note: The elevation of Windom Peak includes an adjustment of +1.785 m (5.86 ft) from NGVD 29 to NAVD 88.) | Colorado | Needle Mountains | 4296 m 14,093 ft | 667 m 2,187 ft | 42.4 km 26.3 mi | 37.6212°N 107.5919°W |
| 22 | Handies Peak | Colorado | San Juan Mountains | 4284.8 m 14,058 ft | 582 m 1,908 ft | 18 km 11.18 mi | 37.9130°N 107.5044°W |
| 23 | Culebra Peak (Note: The summit of Culebra Peak is the highest point of the Culebra Range.) (Note: Culebra Peak is the southernmost 14,000-foot (4267-meter) summit of the Rocky Mountains.) (Note: The elevation of Culebra Peak includes an adjustment of +1.74 m (5.71 ft) from NGVD 29 to NAVD 88.) | Colorado | Culebra Range | 4283 m 14,053 ft | 1471 m 4,827 ft | 56.9 km 35.4 mi | 37.1224°N 105.1858°W |
| 24 | San Luis Peak (Note: The summit of San Luis Peak is the highest point of the La Garita Mountains.) | Colorado | La Garita Mountains | 4273.8 m 14,022 ft | 949 m 3,113 ft | 43.4 km 26.9 mi | 37.9868°N 106.9313°W |
| 25 | Mount of the Holy Cross (Note: The summit of Mount of the Holy Cross is the highest point of the northern Sawatch Range.) (Note: The summit elevation of Mount of the Holy Cross includes a vertical offset of +0.61 m (2 ft) from the station benchmark.) | Colorado | Sawatch Range | 4270.5 m 14,011 ft | 644 m 2,113 ft | 29.6 km 18.41 mi | 39.4668°N 106.4817°W |
| 26 | Grizzly Peak | Colorado | Sawatch Range | 4265.6 m 13,995 ft | 588 m 1,928 ft | 10.89 km 6.77 mi | 39.0425°N 106.5976°W |
| 27 | Mount Ouray (Note: The summit of Mount Ouray is the highest point of the far southern Sawatch Range.) | Colorado | Sawatch Range | 4255.4 m 13,961 ft | 810 m 2,659 ft | 21.9 km 13.58 mi | 38.4227°N 106.2247°W |
| 28 | Vermilion Peak (Note: The elevation of Vermilion Peak includes an adjustment of +1.827 m (5.99 ft) from NGVD 29 to NAVD 88.) | Colorado | San Juan Mountains | 4237 m 13,900 ft | 642 m 2,105 ft | 14.6 km 9.07 mi | 37.7993°N 107.8285°W |
| 29 | Mount Silverheels | Colorado | Front Range | 4215 m 13,829 ft | 696 m 2,283 ft | 8.82 km 5.48 mi | 39.3394°N 106.0054°W |
| 30 | Rio Grande Pyramid | Colorado | San Juan Mountains | 4214.4 m 13,827 ft | 573 m 1,881 ft | 17.31 km 10.76 mi | 37.6797°N 107.3924°W |
| 31 | Gannett Peak (Note: The summit of Gannett Peak is the highest point of the Wind River Range, the U.S. State of Wyoming, and the central Rocky Mountains.) (Note: Gannett Peak is the northernmost and westernmost summit of its elevation in the Rocky Mountains.) | Wyoming | Wind River Range | 4209.1 m 13,809 ft | 2157 m 7,076 ft | 467 km 290 mi | 43.1842°N 109.6542°W |
| 32 | Grand Teton (Note: The summit of Grand Teton is the highest point of the Teton Range.) (Note: Grand Teton is the northernmost and westernmost 4000-meter (13,123-foot) summit of the Rocky Mountains.) | Wyoming | Teton Range | 4198.7 m 13,775 ft | 1995 m 6,545 ft | 111.6 km 69.4 mi | 43.7412°N 110.8024°W |
| 33 | Bald Mountain (Note: The elevation of Bald Mountain includes an adjustment of +1.922 m (6.31 ft) from NGVD 29 to NAVD 88.) | Colorado | Front Range | 4173 m 13,690 ft | 640 m 2,099 ft | 12.09 km 7.51 mi | 39.4448°N 105.9705°W |
| 34 | Mount Oso (Note: The elevation of Mount Oso includes an adjustment of +1.776 m (5.83 ft) from NGVD 29 to NAVD 88.) | Colorado | San Juan Mountains | 4173 m 13,690 ft | 507 m 1,664 ft | 8.71 km 5.41 mi | 37.6070°N 107.4936°W |
| 35 | Mount Jackson | Colorado | Sawatch Range | 4168.5 m 13,676 ft | 552 m 1,810 ft | 5.16 km 3.21 mi | 39.4853°N 106.5367°W |
| 36 | Bard Peak (Note: The elevation of Bard Peak includes an adjustment of +1.707 m (5.6 ft) from NGVD 29 to NAVD 88.) | Colorado | Front Range | 4159 m 13,647 ft | 518 m 1,701 ft | 8.74 km 5.43 mi | 39.7204°N 105.8044°W |
| 37 | West Spanish Peak (Note: West Spanish Peak is the easternmost 4000-meter (13,123-foot) summit of the Rocky Mountains and the United States.) (Note: The elevation of West Spanish Peak includes an adjustment of +1.468 m (4.82 ft) from NGVD 29 to NAVD 88.) | Colorado | Spanish Peaks | 4155 m 13,631 ft | 1123 m 3,686 ft | 32 km 19.87 mi | 37.3756°N 104.9934°W |
| 38 | Mount Powell (Note: The summit of Mount Powell is the highest point of the Gore Range.) (Note: The elevation of Mount Powell includes an adjustment of +1.771 m (5.81 ft) from NGVD 29 to NAVD 88.) | Colorado | Gore Range | 4141 m 13,586 ft | 914 m 3,000 ft | 34.6 km 21.5 mi | 39.7601°N 106.3407°W |
| 39 | Hagues Peak (Note: The summit of Hagues Peak is the highest point of the Mummy Range.) | Colorado | Mummy Range | 4137 m 13,573 ft | 738 m 2,420 ft | 25.3 km 15.7 mi | 40.4845°N 105.6464°W |
| 40 | Tower Mountain (Note: The elevation of Tower Mountain includes an adjustment of +1.796 m (5.89 ft) from NGVD 29 to NAVD 88.) | Colorado | San Juan Mountains | 4132 m 13,558 ft | 504 m 1,652 ft | 7.86 km 4.88 mi | 37.8573°N 107.6230°W |
| 41 | Treasure Mountain (Note: The elevation of Treasure Mountain includes an adjustment of +2.008 m (6.59 ft) from NGVD 29 to NAVD 88.) | Colorado | Elk Mountains | 4125 m 13,535 ft | 862 m 2,828 ft | 11.13 km 6.92 mi | 39.0244°N 107.1228°W |
| 42 | Kings Peak (Note: The summit of Kings Peak is the highest point of the Uinta Mountains, the U.S. State of Utah, and the western Rocky Mountains.) (Note: The elevation of Kings Peak includes an adjustment of +1.807 m (5.93 ft) from NGVD 29 to NAVD 88.) | Utah | Uinta Mountains | 4125 m 13,534 ft | 1938 m 6,358 ft | 268 km 166.6 mi | 40.7763°N 110.3729°W |
| 43 | North Arapaho Peak (Note: The summit of North Arapaho Peak is the highest point of the Indian Peaks.) (Note: The elevation of North Arapaho Peak includes an adjustment of +1.763 m (5.78 ft) from NGVD 29 to NAVD 88.) | Colorado | Front Range | 4117 m 13,508 ft | 507 m 1,665 ft | 24.8 km 15.38 mi | 40.0265°N 105.6504°W |
| 44 | Parry Peak (Note: The elevation of Parry Peak includes an adjustment of +1.763 m (5.78 ft) from NGVD 29 to NAVD 88.) | Colorado | Front Range | 4083 m 13,397 ft | 524 m 1,720 ft | 15.22 km 9.46 mi | 39.8381°N 105.7132°W |
| 45 | Bill Williams Peak (Note: The summit of Bill Williams Peak is the highest point of the Williams Mountains.) (Note: The elevation of Bill Williams Peak includes an adjustment of +2.044 m (6.71 ft) from NGVD 29 to NAVD 88.) | Colorado | Williams Mountains | 4081 m 13,389 ft | 513 m 1,682 ft | 6 km 3.73 mi | 39.1806°N 106.6102°W |
| 46 | Sultan Mountain (Note: The elevation of Sultan Mountain includes an adjustment of +1.649 m (5.41 ft) from NGVD 29 to NAVD 88.) | Colorado | San Juan Mountains | 4076 m 13,373 ft | 569 m 1,868 ft | 7.39 km 4.59 mi | 37.7859°N 107.7038°W |
| 47 | Mount Herard (Note: The elevation of Mount Herard includes an adjustment of +1.64 m (5.38 ft) from NGVD 29 to NAVD 88.) | Colorado | Sangre de Cristo Mountains | 4068 m 13,345 ft | 622 m 2,040 ft | 7.45 km 4.63 mi | 37.8492°N 105.4949°W |
| 48 | West Buffalo Peak (Note: The elevation of West Buffalo Peak includes an adjustment of +1.834 m (6.02 ft) from NGVD 29 to NAVD 88.) | Colorado | Mosquito Range | 4064 m 13,332 ft | 605 m 1,986 ft | 15.46 km 9.61 mi | 38.9917°N 106.1249°W |
| 49 | Summit Peak (Note: The summit of Summit Peak is the highest point of the southern San Juan Mountains.) | Colorado | San Juan Mountains | 4056.2 m 13,308 ft | 841 m 2,760 ft | 63.7 km 39.6 mi | 37.3506°N 106.6968°W |
| 50 | Middle Peak (Note: Dolores Peak may be higher than Middle Peak.) (Note: The elevation of Middle Peak includes an adjustment of +1.809 m (5.94 ft) from NGVD 29 to NAVD 88.) | Colorado | San Miguel Mountains | 4056 m 13,306 ft | 597 m 1,960 ft | 7.69 km 4.78 mi | 37.8536°N 108.1082°W |
| 51 | Antora Peak (Note: The elevation of Antora Peak includes an adjustment of +1.883 m (6.18 ft) from NGVD 29 to NAVD 88.) | Colorado | Sawatch Range | 4046 m 13,275 ft | 734 m 2,409 ft | 10.86 km 6.75 mi | 38.3250°N 106.2180°W |
| 52 | Henry Mountain (Note: The elevation of Henry Mountain includes an adjustment of +2.037 m (6.68 ft) from NGVD 29 to NAVD 88.) | Colorado | Sawatch Range | 4042 m 13,261 ft | 510 m 1,674 ft | 17.61 km 10.94 mi | 38.6856°N 106.6211°W |
| 53 | Hesperus Mountain (Note: The summit of Hesperus Mountain is the highest point of the La Plata Mountains.) (Note: The elevation of Hesperus Mountain includes an adjustment of +1.65 m (5.41 ft) from NGVD 29 to NAVD 88.) | Colorado | La Plata Mountains | 4035 m 13,237 ft | 869 m 2,852 ft | 39.5 km 24.5 mi | 37.4451°N 108.0890°W |
| 54 | Jacque Peak (Note: The elevation of Jacque Peak includes an adjustment of +1.866 m (6.12 ft) from NGVD 29 to NAVD 88.) | Colorado | Gore Range | 4027 m 13,211 ft | 629 m 2,065 ft | 7.28 km 4.52 mi | 39.4549°N 106.1970°W |
| 55 | Bennett Peak (Note: The elevation of Bennett Peak includes an adjustment of +1.782 m (5.85 ft) from NGVD 29 to NAVD 88.) | Colorado | San Juan Mountains | 4026 m 13,209 ft | 531 m 1,743 ft | 27.5 km 17.08 mi | 37.4833°N 106.4343°W |
| 56 | Wind River Peak (Note: The summit of Wind River Peak is the highest point of the southern Wind River Range.) | Wyoming | Wind River Range | 4022.4 m 13,197 ft | 784 m 2,572 ft | 56.6 km 35.1 mi | 42.7085°N 109.1284°W |
| 57 | Conejos Peak | Colorado | San Juan Mountains | 4017 m 13,179 ft | 583 m 1,912 ft | 13.12 km 8.15 mi | 37.2887°N 106.5709°W |
| 58 | Cloud Peak (Note: The summit of Cloud Peak is the highest point of the Bighorn Mountains.) (Note: Cloud Peak is the northernmost 4000-meter (13,123-foot) summit of the Rocky Mountains.) | Wyoming | Bighorn Mountains | 4013.3 m 13,167 ft | 2157 m 7,077 ft | 233 km 145 mi | 44.3821°N 107.1739°W |
| 58 | Wheeler Peak (Note: The summit of Wheeler Peak is the highest point of the Taos Mountains and the U.S. State of New Mexico.) (Note: Wheeler Peak is the southernmost 4000-meter (13,123-foot) summit of the Rocky Mountains.) | New Mexico | Taos Mountains | 4013.3 m 13,167 ft | 1039 m 3,409 ft | 59.6 km 37 mi | 36.5569°N 105.4169°W |
| 60 | Francs Peak (Note: The summit of Francs Peak is the highest point of the Absaroka Range.) | Wyoming | Absaroka Range | 4012.3 m 13,164 ft | 1236 m 4,056 ft | 76 km 47.2 mi | 43.9613°N 109.3392°W |
| 61 | Twilight Peak (Note: The summit of Twilight Peak is the highest point of the West Needle Mountains.) (Note: The elevation of Twilight Peak includes an adjustment of +1.537 m (5.04 ft) from NGVD 29 to NAVD 88.) | Colorado | Needle Mountains | 4012 m 13,163 ft | 713 m 2,338 ft | 7.86 km 4.88 mi | 37.6630°N 107.7270°W |
| 62 | South River Peak | Colorado | San Juan Mountains | 4009.4 m 13,154 ft | 746 m 2,448 ft | 34 km 21.1 mi | 37.5741°N 106.9815°W |
| 63 | Bushnell Peak | Colorado | Sangre de Cristo Mountains | 3995.8 m 13,110 ft | 733 m 2,405 ft | 17.82 km 11.07 mi | 38.3412°N 105.8892°W |
| 64 | Truchas Peak (Note: The summit of Truchas Peak is the highest point of the Santa Fe Mountains.) (Note: Truchas Peak is the southernmost summit of its elevation in the Rocky Mountains.) | New Mexico | Santa Fe Mountains | 3995.2 m 13,108 ft | 1220 m 4,001 ft | 68.2 km 42.3 mi | 35.9625°N 105.6450°W |
| 65 | West Elk Peak (Note: The summit of West Elk Peak is the highest point of the West Elk Mountains.) | Colorado | West Elk Mountains | 3975.2 m 13,042 ft | 943 m 3,095 ft | 22.2 km 13.78 mi | 38.7179°N 107.1994°W |
| 66 | Mount Centennial (Note: The elevation of Mount Centennial includes an adjustment of +1.814 m (5.95 ft) from NGVD 29 to NAVD 88.) (Peak 13010) | Colorado | San Juan Mountains | 3967 m 13,016 ft | 546 m 1,790 ft | 4.61 km 2.86 mi | 37.6062°N 107.2446°W |
| 67 | Mount Robson (Note: The summit of Mount Robson is the highest point of the Canadian Rockies.) (Note: Mount Robson is the easternmost summit of its elevation in Canada and the northernmost and westernmost summit of its elevation in the Rocky Mountains.) | British Columbia | Canadian Rockies | 3959 m 12,989 ft | 2829 m 9,281 ft | 460 km 286 mi | 53.1105°N 119.1566°W |
| 68 | Clark Peak (Note: The summit of Clark Peak is the highest point of the Medicine Bow Mountains.) | Colorado | Medicine Bow Mountains | 3948.4 m 12,954 ft | 845 m 2,771 ft | 26.4 km 16.4 mi | 40.6068°N 105.9300°W |
| 69 | Mount Richthofen (Note: The summit of Mount Richthofen is the highest point of the Never Summer Mountains.) (Note: The elevation of Mount Richthofen includes an adjustment of +1.658 m (5.44 ft) from NGVD 29 to NAVD 88.) | Colorado | Never Summer Mountains | 3946 m 12,945 ft | 817 m 2,680 ft | 15.54 km 9.66 mi | 40.4695°N 105.8945°W |
| 70 | Lizard Head Peak (Note: The summit of Lizard Head Peak is the highest point of the Cirque of the Towers.) (Note: The elevation of Lizard Head Peak includes an adjustment of +1.572 m (5.16 ft) from NGVD 29 to NAVD 88.) | Wyoming | Wind River Range | 3916 m 12,847 ft | 580 m 1,902 ft | 10.4 km 6.46 mi | 42.7901°N 109.1978°W |
| 71 | Granite Peak (Note: The summit of Granite Peak is the highest point of the Beartooth Mountains and the U.S. State of Montana.) | Montana | Beartooth Mountains | 3903.5 m 12,807 ft | 1457 m 4,779 ft | 138.5 km 86 mi | 45.1634°N 109.8075°W |
| 72 | Venado Peak (Note: The elevation of Venado Peak includes an adjustment of +1.65 m (5.41 ft) from NGVD 29 to NAVD 88.) | New Mexico | Taos Mountains | 3883 m 12,739 ft | 906 m 2,971 ft | 18.99 km 11.8 mi | 36.7917°N 105.4933°W |
| 73 | Chair Mountain | Colorado | Elk Mountains | 3879.1 m 12,727 ft | 750 m 2,461 ft | 14.3 km 8.89 mi | 39.0581°N 107.2822°W |
| 74 | Mount Gunnison | Colorado | West Elk Mountains | 3878.7 m 12,725 ft | 1079 m 3,539 ft | 19.05 km 11.84 mi | 38.8121°N 107.3826°W |
| 75 | East Spanish Peak (Note: East Spanish Peak is the easternmost 3000-meter (9843-foot) summit of the Rocky Mountains and the United States.) (Note: The elevation of East Spanish Peak includes an adjustment of +1.372 m (4.5 ft) from NGVD 29 to NAVD 88.) | Colorado | Spanish Peaks | 3867 m 12,688 ft | 726 m 2,383 ft | 6.78 km 4.21 mi | 37.3934°N 104.9201°W |
| 76 | Borah Peak (Note: The summit of Borah Peak is the highest point of the Lost River Range and the U.S. State of Idaho.) | Idaho | Lost River Range | 3861.2 m 12,668 ft | 1829 m 6,002 ft | 243 km 150.8 mi | 44.1374°N 113.7811°W |
| 77 | Mount Wood (Note: The summit of Mount Wood is the highest point of the Granite Range.) (Note: The elevation of Mount Wood includes an adjustment of +1.516 m (4.97 ft) from NGVD 29 to NAVD 88.) | Montana | Absaroka Range | 3860 m 12,665 ft | 878 m 2,880 ft | 12.04 km 7.48 mi | 45.2749°N 109.8078°W |
| 78 | Santa Fe Baldy (Note: Santa Fe Baldy is the southernmost 3000-meter (9843-foot) summit of the Rocky Mountains.) | New Mexico | Santa Fe Mountains | 3850.1 m 12,632 ft | 610 m 2,002 ft | 17.69 km 10.99 mi | 35.8322°N 105.7581°W |
| 79 | Gothic Mountain (Note: The elevation of Gothic Mountain includes an adjustment of +1.936 m (6.35 ft) from NGVD 29 to NAVD 88.) | Colorado | Elk Mountains | 3850 m 12,631 ft | 501 m 1,645 ft | 4.39 km 2.73 mi | 38.9562°N 107.0107°W |
| 80 | Castle Mountain | Montana | Absaroka Range | 3846.1 m 12,618 ft | 814 m 2,672 ft | 15.67 km 9.74 mi | 45.0989°N 109.6305°W |
| 80 | Lone Cone | Colorado | San Miguel Mountains | 3846.1 m 12,618 ft | 693 m 2,273 ft | 13.52 km 8.4 mi | 37.8880°N 108.2556°W |
| 82 | Mount Moran | Wyoming | Teton Range | 3843.5 m 12,610 ft | 806 m 2,645 ft | 9.94 km 6.18 mi | 43.8350°N 110.7765°W |
| 83 | Little Costilla Peak | New Mexico | Culebra Range | 3836.8 m 12,588 ft | 745 m 2,444 ft | 12.48 km 7.75 mi | 36.8335°N 105.2229°W |
| 84 | Graham Peak | Colorado | San Juan Mountains | 3821.1 m 12,536 ft | 778 m 2,551 ft | 13.9 km 8.64 mi | 37.4972°N 107.3761°W |
| 85 | Whetstone Mountain | Colorado | West Elk Mountains | 3818.1 m 12,527 ft | 749 m 2,456 ft | 15.11 km 9.39 mi | 38.8223°N 106.9799°W |
| 86 | Atlantic Peak (Note: The elevation of Atlantic Peak includes an adjustment of +1.521 m (4.99 ft) from NGVD 29 to NAVD 88.) | Wyoming | Wind River Range | 3808 m 12,495 ft | 655 m 2,150 ft | 14.6 km 9.07 mi | 42.6165°N 109.0013°W |
| 87 | Specimen Mountain (Note: The elevation of Specimen Mountain includes an adjustment of +1.614 m (5.3 ft) from NGVD 29 to NAVD 88.) | Colorado | Front Range | 3808 m 12,494 ft | 528 m 1,731 ft | 7.56 km 4.7 mi | 40.4449°N 105.8081°W |
| 88 | Baldy Mountain (Note: The summit of Baldy Mountain is the highest point of the Cimarron Range.) | New Mexico | Cimarron Range | 3793.3 m 12,445 ft | 823 m 2,701 ft | 18.24 km 11.33 mi | 36.6299°N 105.2134°W |
| 89 | East Beckwith Mountain | Colorado | West Elk Mountains | 3792.1 m 12,441 ft | 760 m 2,492 ft | 10.05 km 6.24 mi | 38.8464°N 107.2233°W |
| 90 | Knobby Crest (Note: The summit of Knobby Crest is the highest point of the Kenosha Mountains.) (Note: The elevation of Knobby Crest includes an adjustment of +1.595 m (5.23 ft) from NGVD 29 to NAVD 88.) | Colorado | Kenosha Mountains | 3790 m 12,434 ft | 536 m 1,759 ft | 13.31 km 8.27 mi | 39.3681°N 105.6050°W |
| 91 | Bison Peak (Note: The summit of Bison Peak is the highest point of the Tarryall Mountains.) | Colorado | Tarryall Mountains | 3789.4 m 12,432 ft | 747 m 2,451 ft | 29.3 km 18.23 mi | 39.2384°N 105.4978°W |
| 92 | Anthracite Range High Point | Colorado | West Elk Mountains | 3777.8 m 12,394 ft | 648 m 2,125 ft | 7.68 km 4.77 mi | 38.8145°N 107.1445°W |
| 93 | Matchless Mountain (Note: The elevation of Matchless Mountain includes an adjustment of +1.941 m (6.37 ft) from NGVD 29 to NAVD 88.) | Colorado | Elk Mountains | 3776 m 12,389 ft | 537 m 1,763 ft | 12.67 km 7.87 mi | 38.8340°N 106.6451°W |
| 94 | Flat Top Mountain (Note: The summit of Flat Top Mountain is the highest point of the Flat Tops.) | Colorado | Flat Tops | 3767.7 m 12,361 ft | 1236 m 4,054 ft | 65.6 km 40.8 mi | 40.0147°N 107.0833°W |
| 95 | Mount Nystrom | Wyoming | Wind River Range | 3767.5 m 12,361 ft | 554 m 1,816 ft | 7.92 km 4.92 mi | 42.6418°N 109.0939°W |
| 96 | Greenhorn Mountain (Note: The summit of Greenhorn Mountain is the highest point of the Wet Mountains.) | Colorado | Wet Mountains | 3765 m 12,352 ft | 1151 m 3,777 ft | 40.6 km 25.2 mi | 37.8815°N 105.0133°W |
| 97 | Elliott Mountain (Note: The elevation of Elliott Mountain includes an adjustment of +1.709 m (5.61 ft) from NGVD 29 to NAVD 88.) | Colorado | San Miguel Mountains | 3763 m 12,346 ft | 683 m 2,240 ft | 8.26 km 5.13 mi | 37.7344°N 108.0580°W |
| 98 | Carter Mountain | Wyoming | Absaroka Range | 3756.4 m 12,324 ft | 518 m 1,699 ft | 26.8 km 16.68 mi | 44.1972°N 109.4112°W |
| 99 | Parkview Mountain (Note: The summit of Parkview Mountain is the highest point of the Rabbit Ears Range.) | Colorado | Rabbit Ears Range | 3749.4 m 12,301 ft | 816 m 2,676 ft | 15.07 km 9.36 mi | 40.3303°N 106.1363°W |
| 100 | Cornwall Mountain (Note: The elevation of Cornwall Mountain includes an adjustment of +1.715 m (5.63 ft) from NGVD 29 to NAVD 88.) | Colorado | San Juan Mountains | 3746 m 12,291 ft | 532 m 1,744 ft | 8.37 km 5.2 mi | 37.3811°N 106.4920°W |
| 101 | Mount Columbia (Note: Mount Columbia on the Great Divide between British Columbia and Alberta is the highest point of the Columbia Icefield, the Province of Alberta, and the entire Beaufort Sea Drainage basin.) | Alberta; British Columbia | Canadian Rockies | 3741 m 12,274 ft | 2371 m 7,779 ft | 158 km 98.2 mi | 52.1473°N 117.4416°W |
| 102 | Trout Peak (Note: The summit of Trout Peak is the highest point of the central Absaroka Range.) | Wyoming | Absaroka Range | 3733.7 m 12,250 ft | 1129 m 3,704 ft | 45.7 km 28.4 mi | 44.6012°N 109.5253°W |
| 103 | North Twin Peak (Note: North Twin Peak is the easternmost summit of its elevation in Canada.) | Alberta | Canadian Rockies | 3733 m 12,247 ft | 743 m 2,438 ft | 8.52 km 5.29 mi | 52.2238°N 117.4345°W |
| 104 | Diamond Peak (Note: The summit of Diamond Peak is the highest point of the Lemhi Range.) | Idaho | Lemhi Range | 3719.3 m 12,202 ft | 1642 m 5,387 ft | 51.2 km 31.8 mi | 44.1414°N 113.0827°W |
| 105 | Mount Zirkel (Note: The summit of Mount Zirkel is the highest point of the Park Range.) (Note: The elevation of Mount Zirkel includes an adjustment of +1.632 m (5.35 ft) from NGVD 29 to NAVD 88.) | Colorado | Park Range | 3714 m 12,185 ft | 1058 m 3,470 ft | 60.6 km 37.7 mi | 40.8313°N 106.6631°W |
| 106 | Crested Butte (Note: The elevation of Crested Butte includes an adjustment of +1.94 m (6.36 ft) from NGVD 29 to NAVD 88.) | Colorado | Elk Mountains | 3709 m 12,168 ft | 787 m 2,582 ft | 7.49 km 4.65 mi | 38.8835°N 106.9436°W |
| 107 | Younts Peak | Wyoming | Absaroka Range | 3708.3 m 12,166 ft | 683 m 2,241 ft | 20.4 km 12.7 mi | 43.9820°N 109.8665°W |
| 108 | Sawtooth Mountain | Colorado | La Garita Mountains | 3704.2 m 12,153 ft | 587 m 1,927 ft | 26.9 km 16.73 mi | 38.2740°N 106.8670°W |
| 109 | Park Cone (Note: The elevation of Park Cone includes an adjustment of +1.873 m (6.15 ft) from NGVD 29 to NAVD 88.) | Colorado | Sawatch Range | 3690 m 12,106 ft | 622 m 2,040 ft | 5.53 km 3.44 mi | 38.7967°N 106.6028°W |
| 110 | Carbon Peak | Colorado | West Elk Mountains | 3684.3 m 12,088 ft | 664 m 2,179 ft | 6.31 km 3.92 mi | 38.7943°N 107.0431°W |
| 111 | Glover Peak (Note: The elevation of Glover Peak includes an adjustment of +1.609 m (5.28 ft) from NGVD 29 to NAVD 88.) | Wyoming | Wind River Range | 3680 m 12,072 ft | 520 m 1,706 ft | 4 km 2.49 mi | 43.1589°N 109.7656°W |
| 112 | Mount Guero | Colorado | West Elk Mountains | 3675.4 m 12,058 ft | 741 m 2,432 ft | 10.27 km 6.38 mi | 38.7196°N 107.3861°W |
| 113 | Red Table Mountain | Colorado | Sawatch Range | 3670.7 m 12,043 ft | 615 m 2,017 ft | 12.68 km 7.88 mi | 39.4181°N 106.7712°W |
| 114 | Chalk Benchmark | Colorado | San Juan Mountains | 3669.3 m 12,038 ft | 601 m 1,971 ft | 11.68 km 7.26 mi | 37.1418°N 106.7500°W |
| 115 | Mount Clemenceau (Note: The summit of Mount Clemenceau is the highest point of the Clémenceau Icefield.) | British Columbia | Canadian Rockies | 3664 m 12,021 ft | 1494 m 4,902 ft | 35.9 km 22.3 mi | 52.2475°N 117.9578°W |
| 116 | Medicine Bow Peak (Note: The summit of Medicine Bow Peak is the highest point of the Snowy Range.) | Wyoming | Medicine Bow Mountains | 3662.4 m 12,016 ft | 988 m 3,243 ft | 65.4 km 40.6 mi | 41.3603°N 106.3176°W |
| 117 | Mount Zwischen (Note: The elevation of Mount Zwischen includes an adjustment of +1.481 m (4.86 ft) from NGVD 29 to NAVD 88.) | Colorado | Sangre de Cristo Mountains | 3661 m 12,011 ft | 691 m 2,266 ft | 7.14 km 4.44 mi | 37.7913°N 105.4554°W |
| 118 | Little Cone | Colorado | San Miguel Mountains | 3654 m 11,988 ft | 561 m 1,840 ft | 8.35 km 5.19 mi | 37.9275°N 108.0908°W |
| 119 | Cerro Vista (Note: The summit of Cerro Vista is the highest point of the southern Sangre de Cristo Range.) | New Mexico | Sangre de Cristo Mountains | 3638.3 m 11,937 ft | 768 m 2,519 ft | 22.8 km 14.19 mi | 36.2353°N 105.4108°W |
| 120 | Mount Nebo (Note: The summit of Mount Nebo is the highest point of the Wasatch Range.) (Note: The elevation of Mount Nebo includes an adjustment of +1.395 m (4.58 ft) from NGVD 29 to NAVD 88.) | Utah | Wasatch Range | 3637 m 11,933 ft | 1679 m 5,508 ft | 121.6 km 75.6 mi | 39.8219°N 111.7603°W |
| 121 | Mount Alberta (Note: The summit of Mount Alberta is the highest point of the Winston Churchill Range.) | Alberta | Canadian Rockies | 3620 m 11,877 ft | 800 m 2,625 ft | 6.86 km 4.26 mi | 52.2850°N 117.4772°W |
| 122 | Mount Forbes (Note: The summit of Mount Forbes is the highest point of the entire Hudson Bay drainage basin.) (Note: Mount Forbes is the easternmost summit of its elevation in Canada.) | Alberta | Canadian Rockies | 3617 m 11,867 ft | 1649 m 5,410 ft | 47.4 km 29.5 mi | 51.8600°N 116.9316°W |
| 123 | Mount Assiniboine (Note: Mount Assiniboine is the southernmost and easternmost summit of its elevation in Canada.) | Alberta; British Columbia | Canadian Rockies | 3616 m 11,864 ft | 2082 m 6,831 ft | 141.8 km 88.1 mi | 50.8696°N 115.6509°W |
| 124 | Huntsman Ridge (Note: The elevation of Huntsman Ridge includes an adjustment of +1.711 m (5.61 ft) from NGVD 29 to NAVD 88.) (Dutch Peak) | Colorado | Elk Mountains | 3614 m 11,858 ft | 936 m 3,072 ft | 16.58 km 10.3 mi | 39.1920°N 107.3668°W |
| 125 | Sheep Mountain | Colorado | Rabbit Ears Range | 3604.2 m 11,825 ft | 546 m 1,792 ft | 11.53 km 7.16 mi | 40.3610°N 106.2658°W |
| 126 | Castle Peak (Note: The summit of Castle Peak is the highest point of the White Cloud Mountains.) | Idaho | White Cloud Mountains | 3600.4 m 11,812 ft | 1230 m 4,035 ft | 44 km 27.3 mi | 44.0402°N 114.5887°W |
| 127 | Mount Timpanogos (Note: The summit of Mount Timpanogos is the highest point of the central Wasatch Range.) | Utah | Wasatch Range | 3582 m 11,752 ft | 1609 m 5,279 ft | 63.8 km 39.6 mi | 40.3908°N 111.6459°W |
| 128 | Waugh Mountain (Note: The summit of Waugh Mountain is the highest point of the South Park Hills.) (Note: The elevation of Waugh Mountain includes an adjustment of +1.702 m (5.58 ft) from NGVD 29 to NAVD 88.) | Colorado | South Park Hills | 3571 m 11,716 ft | 710 m 2,330 ft | 30.4 km 18.86 mi | 38.6022°N 105.6955°W |
| 129 | Coal Mountain (Note: The elevation of Coal Mountain includes an adjustment of +1.625 m (5.33 ft) from NGVD 29 to NAVD 88.) | Colorado | West Elk Mountains | 3569 m 11,710 ft | 523 m 1,715 ft | 9.22 km 5.73 mi | 38.7870°N 107.4837°W |
| 130 | Mount Goodsir (Note: The summit of Mount Goodsir is the highest point of the Ottertail Range.) | British Columbia | Canadian Rockies | 3567 m 11,703 ft | 1917 m 6,289 ft | 64.1 km 39.8 mi | 51.2021°N 116.3975°W |
| 131 | Black Mountain (Note: The elevation of Black Mountain includes an adjustment of +1.631 m (5.35 ft) from NGVD 29 to NAVD 88.) | Colorado | South Park Hills | 3554 m 11,659 ft | 681 m 2,234 ft | 12.92 km 8.03 mi | 38.7185°N 105.6874°W |
| 132 | Williams Peak | Colorado | Front Range | 3541.8 m 11,620 ft | 625 m 2,049 ft | 13.93 km 8.66 mi | 39.8552°N 106.1854°W |
| 133 | Mount Temple (Note: The summit of Mount Temple is the highest point of the Bow Range.) | Alberta | Canadian Rockies | 3540 m 11,614 ft | 1530 m 5,020 ft | 21.3 km 13.22 mi | 51.3511°N 116.2063°W |
| 134 | Puma Peak (Note: The elevation of Puma Peak includes an adjustment of +1.513 m (4.96 ft) from NGVD 29 to NAVD 88.) | Colorado | South Park Hills | 3528 m 11,575 ft | 689 m 2,260 ft | 11.44 km 7.11 mi | 39.1572°N 105.5815°W |
| 135 | Mount Mestas (Note: The elevation of Mount Mestas includes an adjustment of +1.372 m (4.5 ft) from NGVD 29 to NAVD 88.) | Colorado | Sangre de Cristo Mountains | 3528 m 11,574 ft | 679 m 2,229 ft | 23.3 km 14.47 mi | 37.5830°N 105.1474°W |
| 136 | Mount Brazeau | Alberta | Canadian Rockies | 3525 m 11,565 ft | 1475 m 4,839 ft | 30.8 km 19.14 mi | 52.5515°N 117.3549°W |
| 137 | Thirtynine Mile Mountain (Note: The elevation of Thirtynine Mile Mountain includes an adjustment of +1.584 m (5.2 ft) from NGVD 29 to NAVD 88.) | Colorado | South Park Hills | 3521 m 11,553 ft | 636 m 2,088 ft | 17.08 km 10.61 mi | 38.8324°N 105.5553°W |
| 138 | Tomichi Dome (Note: The elevation of Tomichi Dome includes an adjustment of +1.693 m (5.55 ft) from NGVD 29 to NAVD 88.) | Colorado | Sawatch Range | 3496 m 11,471 ft | 709 m 2,325 ft | 15.04 km 9.35 mi | 38.4849°N 106.5291°W |
| 139 | Blair Mountain (Note: The summit of Blair Mountain is the highest point of the White River Plateau.) (Note: The elevation of Blair Mountain includes an adjustment of +1.565 m (5.13 ft) from NGVD 29 to NAVD 88.) | Colorado | White River Plateau | 3495 m 11,465 ft | 529 m 1,736 ft | 18.5 km 11.5 mi | 39.7943°N 107.4176°W |
| 140 | Twin Sisters Peaks (Note: The elevation of Twin Sisters Peaks includes an adjustment of +1.388 m (4.55 ft) from NGVD 29 to NAVD 88.) | Colorado | Front Range | 3485 m 11,433 ft | 700 m 2,298 ft | 6.48 km 4.03 mi | 40.2886°N 105.5175°W |
| 141 | Elk Mountain | Colorado | Rabbit Ears Range | 3482.1 m 11,424 ft | 658 m 2,159 ft | 16.93 km 10.52 mi | 40.1619°N 106.1285°W |
| 142 | Wyoming Peak (Note: The summit of Wyoming Peak is the highest point of the Wyoming Range.) | Wyoming | Wyoming Range | 3481.6 m 11,423 ft | 1084 m 3,558 ft | 81.8 km 50.8 mi | 42.6043°N 110.6238°W |
| 143 | Iron Mountain (Note: The elevation of Iron Mountain includes an adjustment of +1.436 m (4.71 ft) from NGVD 29 to NAVD 88.) | Colorado | Sangre de Cristo Range | 3480 m 11,416 ft | 595 m 1,951 ft | 11.18 km 6.95 mi | 37.6375°N 105.2538°W |
| 144 | Marcellina Mountain (Note: The elevation of Marcellina Mountain includes an adjustment of +1.658 m (5.44 ft) from NGVD 29 to NAVD 88.) | Colorado | West Elk Mountains | 3461 m 11,353 ft | 831 m 2,728 ft | 8.18 km 5.08 mi | 38.9299°N 107.2438°W |
| 145 | Crater Peak (Note: The summit of Crater Peak is the highest point of Grand Mesa.) | Colorado | Front Range | 3454.2 m 11,333 ft | 703 m 2,307 ft | 28.9 km 17.98 mi | 39.0396°N 107.6628°W |
| 146 | Hilgard Peak (Note: The summit of Hilgard Peak is the highest point of the Madison Range.) (Note: The elevation of Hilgard Peak includes an adjustment of +1.49 m (4.89 ft) from NGVD 29 to NAVD 88.) | Montana | Madison Range | 3451 m 11,321 ft | 1238 m 4,063 ft | 123 km 76.4 mi | 44.9166°N 111.4593°W |
| 147 | Castle Peak (Note: The elevation of Castle Peak includes an adjustment of +1.575 m (5.17 ft) from NGVD 29 to NAVD 88.) | Colorado | Sawatch Range | 3446 m 11,305 ft | 927 m 3,040 ft | 26.6 km 16.51 mi | 39.7723°N 106.8304°W |
| 148 | Mount Joffre (Note: Mount Joffre is the easternmost summit of its elevation in Canada.) | Alberta; British Columbia | Canadian Rockies | 3433 m 11,263 ft | 1505 m 4,938 ft | 49.2 km 30.6 mi | 50.5285°N 115.2069°W |
| 149 | Crazy Peak (Note: The summit of Crazy Peak is the highest point of the Crazy Mountains.) (Note: The elevation of Crazy Peak includes an adjustment of +1.421 m (4.66 ft) from NGVD 29 to NAVD 88.) | Montana | Crazy Mountains | 3418 m 11,214 ft | 1743 m 5,719 ft | 71.8 km 44.6 mi | 46.0181°N 110.2768°W |
| 150 | Hardscrabble Mountain (Note: The elevation of Hardscrabble Mountain includes an adjustment of +1.612 m (5.29 ft) from NGVD 29 to NAVD 88.) | Colorado | Sawatch Range | 3405 m 11,171 ft | 520 m 1,706 ft | 11.31 km 7.03 mi | 39.5171°N 106.8021°W |
| 151 | Tweedy Mountain (Note: The summit of Tweedy Mountain is the highest point of the Pioneer Mountains.) (Note: The elevation of Tweedy Mountain includes an adjustment of +1.598 m (5.24 ft) from NGVD 29 to NAVD 88.) | Montana | Pioneer Mountains | 3401 m 11,159 ft | 1163 m 3,814 ft | 120.7 km 75 mi | 45.4805°N 112.9655°W |
| 152 | Whitehorn Mountain (Note: Whitehorn Mountain is the northernmost and westernmost summit of its elevation in the Rocky Mountains.) | British Columbia | Canadian Rockies | 3399 m 11,152 ft | 1747 m 5,732 ft | 7.94 km 4.93 mi | 53.1370°N 119.2667°W |
| 153 | Cochetopa Dome (Note: The elevation of Cochetopa Dome includes an adjustment of +1.804 m (5.92 ft) from NGVD 29 to NAVD 88.) | Colorado | La Garita Mountains | 3395 m 11,138 ft | 537 m 1,762 ft | 9.9 km 6.15 mi | 38.2267°N 106.7147°W |
| 154 | Mount Hector | Alberta | Canadian Rockies | 3394 m 11,135 ft | 1759 m 5,771 ft | 21.5 km 13.34 mi | 51.5752°N 116.2590°W |
| 155 | North Mamm Peak | Colorado | Front Range | 3391.3 m 11,126 ft | 946 m 3,103 ft | 34.1 km 21.2 mi | 39.3865°N 107.8660°W |
| 156 | Mount Edith Cavell | Alberta | Canadian Rockies | 3363 m 11,033 ft | 2033 m 6,670 ft | 47.2 km 29.3 mi | 52.6672°N 118.0569°W |
| 157 | Mount Fryatt (Note: The summit of Mount Fryatt is the highest point of the Hooker Icefield.) | Alberta | Canadian Rockies | 3361 m 11,027 ft | 1608 m 5,276 ft | 16.37 km 10.17 mi | 52.5503°N 117.9104°W |
| 158 | Laramie Mountains high point (Note: The elevation of Laramie Mountains high point includes an adjustment of +1.415 m (4.64 ft) from NGVD 29 to NAVD 88.) | Colorado | Laramie Mountains | 3360 m 11,025 ft | 573 m 1,880 ft | 13.74 km 8.54 mi | 40.7704°N 105.7162°W |
| 159 | Mount Harrison (Note: Mount Harrison is the southernmost and easternmost 3000-meter (9843-foot) summit of Canada.) | British Columbia | Canadian Rockies | 3360 m 11,024 ft | 1770 m 5,807 ft | 52.1 km 32.4 mi | 50.0604°N 115.2057°W |
| 160 | Sand Mountain North (Note: The summit of Sand Mountain North is the highest point of the Elkhead Mountains.) (Note: The elevation of Sand Mountain North includes an adjustment of +1.502 m (4.93 ft) from NGVD 29 to NAVD 88.) | Colorado | Elkhead Mountains | 3317 m 10,884 ft | 664 m 2,179 ft | 28.5 km 17.7 mi | 40.7636°N 107.0575°W |
| 161 | Mount Chown (Note: Mount Chown is the northernmost and westernmost summit of its elevation in the Rocky Mountains.) | Alberta | Canadian Rockies | 3316 m 10,879 ft | 1746 m 5,728 ft | 30.7 km 19.05 mi | 53.3971°N 119.4173°W |
| 162 | Black Mountain (Note: The elevation of Black Mountain includes an adjustment of +1.537 m (5.04 ft) from NGVD 29 to NAVD 88.) | Colorado | Elkhead Mountains | 3312 m 10,865 ft | 744 m 2,440 ft | 26.4 km 16.4 mi | 40.7835°N 107.3691°W |
| 163 | Sleepy Cat Peak (Note: The elevation of Sleepy Cat Peak includes an adjustment of +1.471 m (4.83 ft) from NGVD 29 to NAVD 88.) | Colorado | Flat Tops | 3308 m 10,853 ft | 716 m 2,348 ft | 17.13 km 10.64 mi | 40.1275°N 107.5338°W |
| 164 | Spruce Mountain | Colorado | Grand Mesa | 3303.5 m 10,838 ft | 553 m 1,813 ft | 13.41 km 8.33 mi | 39.1973°N 107.5220°W |
| 165 | West Goat Peak (Note: The summit of West Goat Peak is the highest point of the Anaconda Range.) (Note: The elevation of West Goat Peak includes an adjustment of +1.52 m (4.99 ft) from NGVD 29 to NAVD 88.) | Montana | Anaconda Range | 3291 m 10,798 ft | 1211 m 3,973 ft | 62.9 km 39.1 mi | 45.9625°N 113.3949°W |
| 166 | Thompson Peak (Note: The summit of Thompson Peak is the highest point of the Sawtooth Range.) | Idaho | Sawtooth Range | 3278.4 m 10,756 ft | 747 m 2,451 ft | 28.6 km 17.77 mi | 44.1415°N 115.0100°W |
| 167 | Mount Sir Alexander (Note: Mount Sir Alexander is the northernmost and westernmost 3000-meter (9843-foot) summit and ultra-prominent summit of the Rocky Mountains.) | British Columbia | Canadian Rockies | 3275 m 10,745 ft | 1762 m 5,781 ft | 87.8 km 54.5 mi | 53.9360°N 120.3869°W |
| 168 | Homer Youngs Peak (Note: The summit of Homer Youngs Peak is the highest point of the West Big Hole Mountains.) (Note: The elevation of Homer Youngs Peak includes an adjustment of +1.483 m (4.87 ft) from NGVD 29 to NAVD 88.) | Montana | Bitterroot Range | 3239 m 10,626 ft | 976 m 3,201 ft | 57.2 km 35.5 mi | 45.3111°N 113.6773°W |
| 169 | Hollowtop Mountain (Note: The summit of Hollowtop Mountain is the highest point of the Tobacco Root Mountains.) (Note: The elevation of Hollowtop Mountain includes an adjustment of +1.486 m (4.88 ft) from NGVD 29 to NAVD 88.) | Montana | Tobacco Root Mountains | 3234 m 10,609 ft | 1190 m 3,904 ft | 54.8 km 34 mi | 45.6116°N 112.0083°W |
| 170 | Sunset Peak (Note: The summit of Sunset Peak is the highest point of the Snowcrest Range.) (Note: The elevation of Sunset Peak includes an adjustment of +1.553 m (5.1 ft) from NGVD 29 to NAVD 88.) | Montana | Snowcrest Range | 3227 m 10,586 ft | 1146 m 3,761 ft | 50.3 km 31.2 mi | 44.8559°N 112.1468°W |
| 171 | Mount Ida (Note: Mount Ida is the northernmost 3000-meter (9843-foot) summit and ultra-prominent summit of the Rocky Mountains.) | British Columbia | Canadian Rockies | 3200 m 10,499 ft | 1530 m 5,020 ft | 14.14 km 8.79 mi | 54.0580°N 120.3268°W |
| 172 | Mount Cleveland (Note: The summit of Mount Cleveland is the highest point of the Lewis Range.) | Montana | Lewis Range | 3194 m 10,479 ft | 1599 m 5,246 ft | 159.9 km 99.4 mi | 48.9249°N 113.8482°W |
| 173 | Green Mountain | Colorado | Kenosha Mountains | 3178.3 m 10,427 ft | 567 m 1,859 ft | 6.72 km 4.18 mi | 39.3053°N 105.3001°W |
| 174 | Laramie Peak | Wyoming | Laramie Mountains | 3132 m 10,276 ft | 1011 m 3,317 ft | 108.4 km 67.4 mi | 42.2681°N 105.4425°W |
| 175 | Columbus Mountain (Note: The elevation of Columbus Mountain includes an adjustment of +1.378 m (4.52 ft) from NGVD 29 to NAVD 88.) | Colorado | Elkhead Mountains | 3126 m 10,258 ft | 583 m 1,913 ft | 12.36 km 7.68 mi | 40.8799°N 107.1921°W |
| 176 | Table Mountain (Note: The summit of Table Mountain is the highest point of the Highland Mountains.) (Note: The elevation of Table Mountain includes an adjustment of +1.467 m (4.81 ft) from NGVD 29 to NAVD 88.) | Montana | Highland Mountains | 3117 m 10,228 ft | 1348 m 4,422 ft | 31.1 km 19.3 mi | 45.7426°N 112.4619°W |
| 177 | Mount Regan (Idaho) (Note: The elevation of Mount Regan (Idaho) includes an adjustment of +1.587 m (5.21 ft) from NGVD 29 to NAVD 88.) | Idaho | Sawtooth Range | 3108 m 10,195 ft | 527 m 1,730 ft | 3.06 km 1.9 mi | 44.1598°N 115.0616°W |
| 178 | Trapper Peak (Note: The summit of Trapper Peak is the highest point of the central Bitterroot Range.) (Note: The elevation of Trapper Peak includes an adjustment of +1.367 m (4.48 ft) from NGVD 29 to NAVD 88.) | Montana | Bitterroot Range | 3097 m 10,162 ft | 1088 m 3,570 ft | 65.6 km 40.8 mi | 45.8898°N 114.2978°W |
| 179 | Mount Stimson | Montana | Lewis Range | 3092.6 m 10,146 ft | 1342 m 4,402 ft | 48.3 km 30 mi | 48.5142°N 113.6104°W |
| 180 | Jeanette Peak | British Columbia | Canadian Rockies | 3089 m 10,135 ft | 1657 m 5,436 ft | 17.54 km 10.9 mi | 52.6357°N 118.6166°W |
| 181 | Kintla Peak (Note: The summit of Kintla Peak is the highest point of the Livingston Range.) (Note: The elevation of Kintla Peak includes an adjustment of +1.413 m (4.64 ft) from NGVD 29 to NAVD 88.) | Montana | Livingston Range | 3080 m 10,106 ft | 1341 m 4,401 ft | 23.8 km 14.78 mi | 48.9437°N 114.1714°W |
| 182 | Ferris Mountain (Note: The summit of Ferris Mountain is the highest point of the Ferris Mountains.) | Wyoming | Ferris Mountains | 3069.6 m 10,071 ft | 1000 m 3,282 ft | 89 km 55.3 mi | 42.2566°N 107.2394°W |
| 183 | Naomi Peak (Note: The summit of Naomi Peak is the highest point of the Bear River Mountains.) | Utah | Wasatch Range | 3043 m 9,984 ft | 966 m 3,169 ft | 98.9 km 61.5 mi | 41.9114°N 111.6754°W |
| 184 | Horse Mountain (Note: The elevation of Horse Mountain includes an adjustment of +1.461 m (4.79 ft) from NGVD 29 to NAVD 88.) | Colorado | San Juan Mountains | 3033 m 9,952 ft | 575 m 1,887 ft | 21 km 13.06 mi | 37.3080°N 107.2864°W |

== Gallery ==
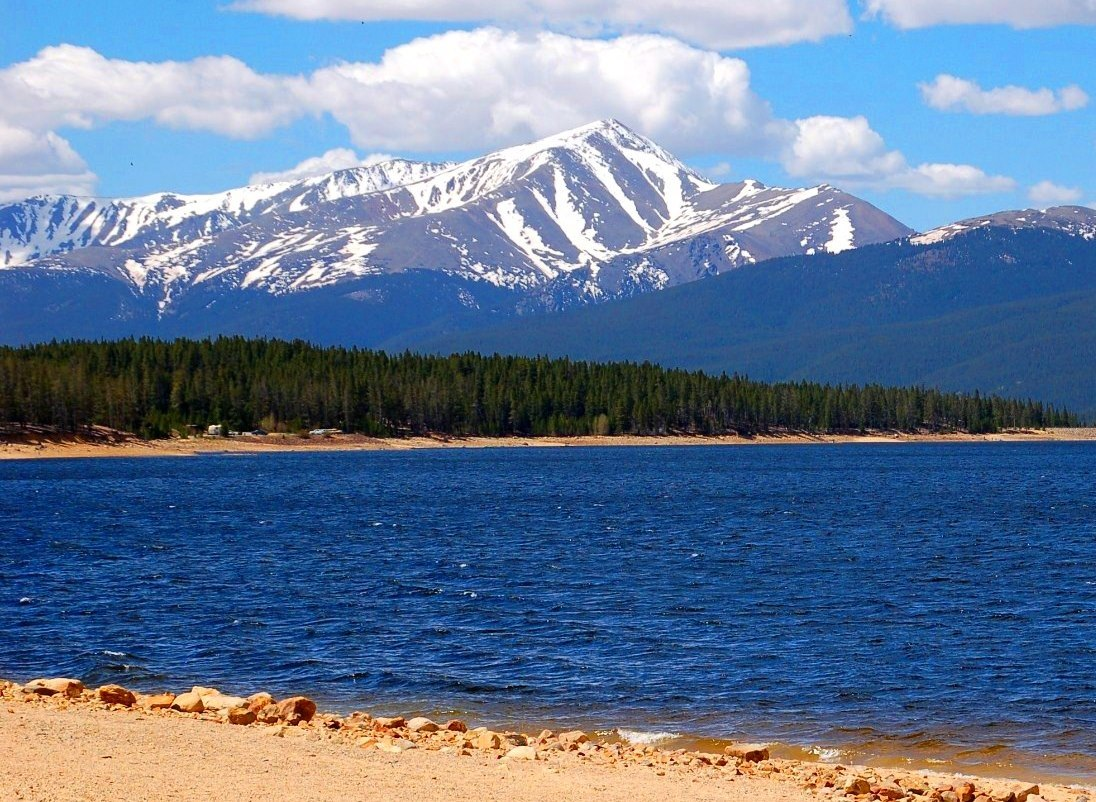
1. Mount Elbert in the Sawatch Range is the highest summit of the Rocky Mountains and the U.S. State of Colorado.

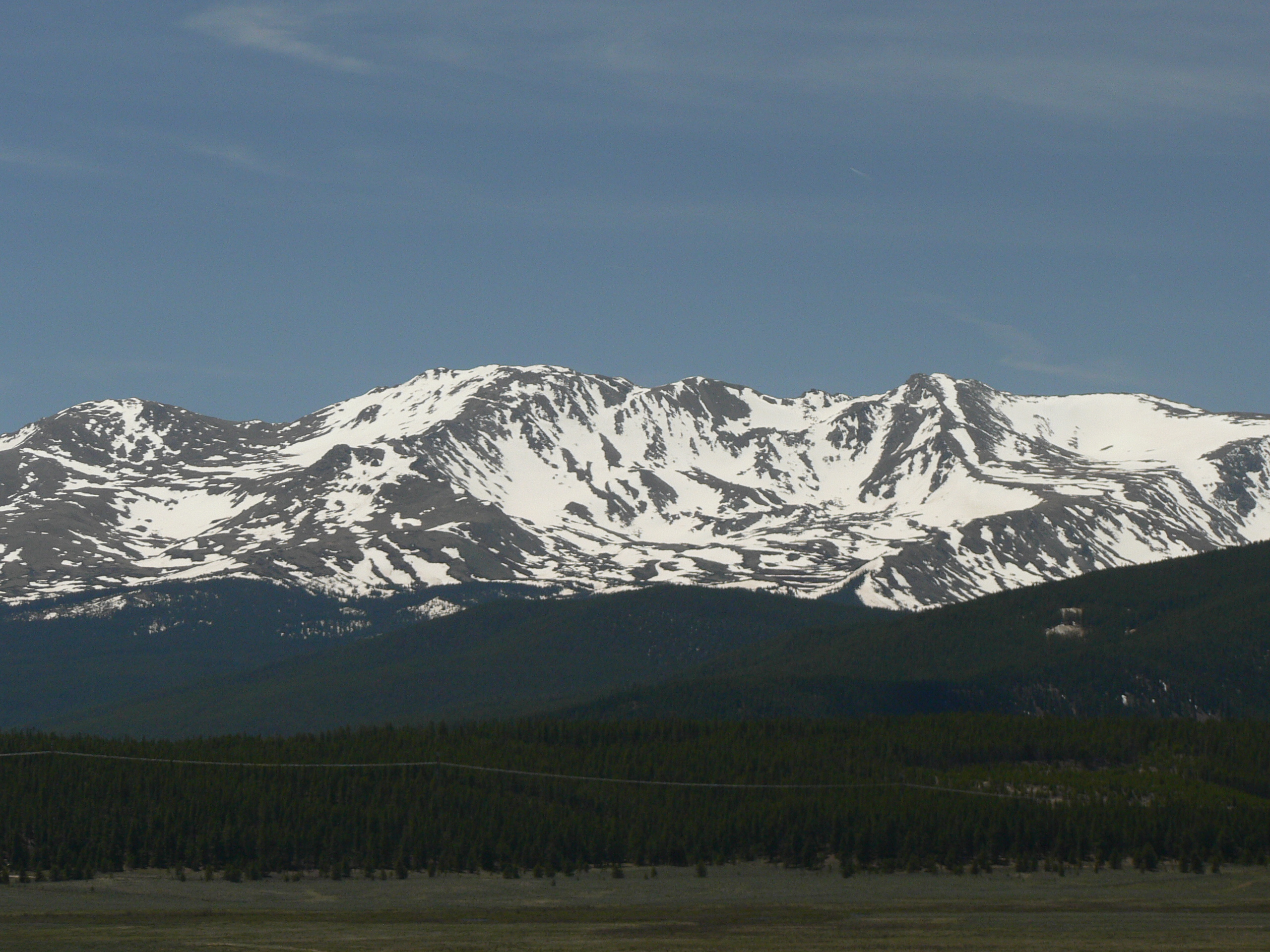
2. Mount Massive in the Sawatch Range of Colorado is the second highest summit of the Rocky Mountains.

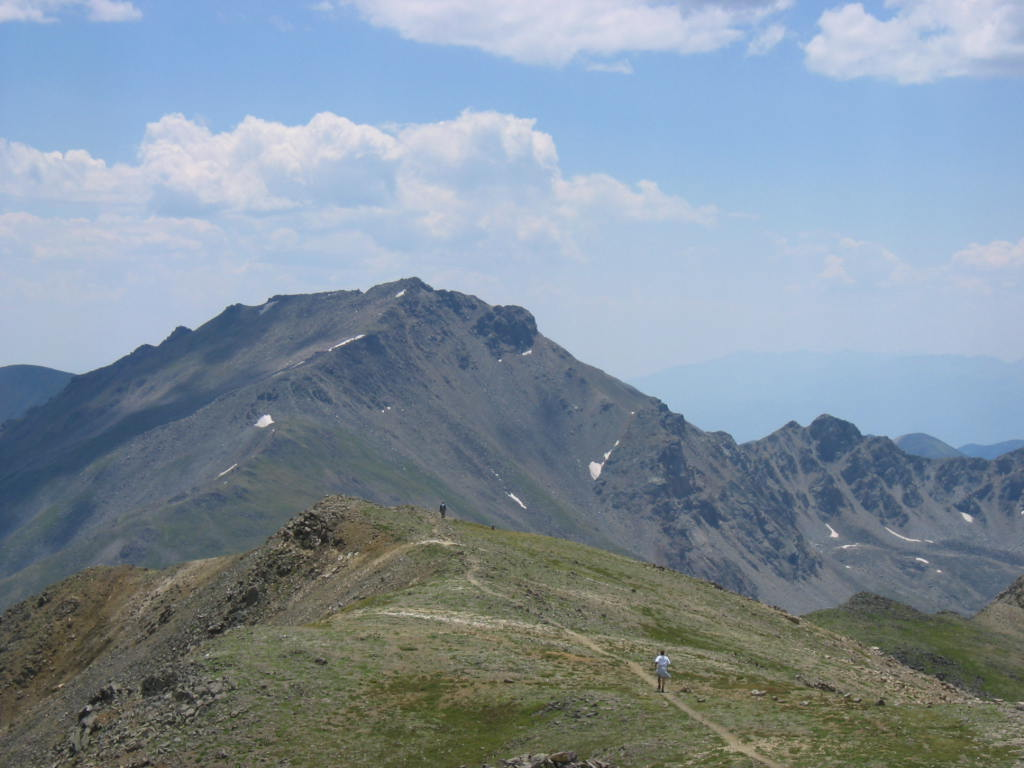
3. Mount Harvard is the highest summit of the Collegiate Peaks of Colorado.

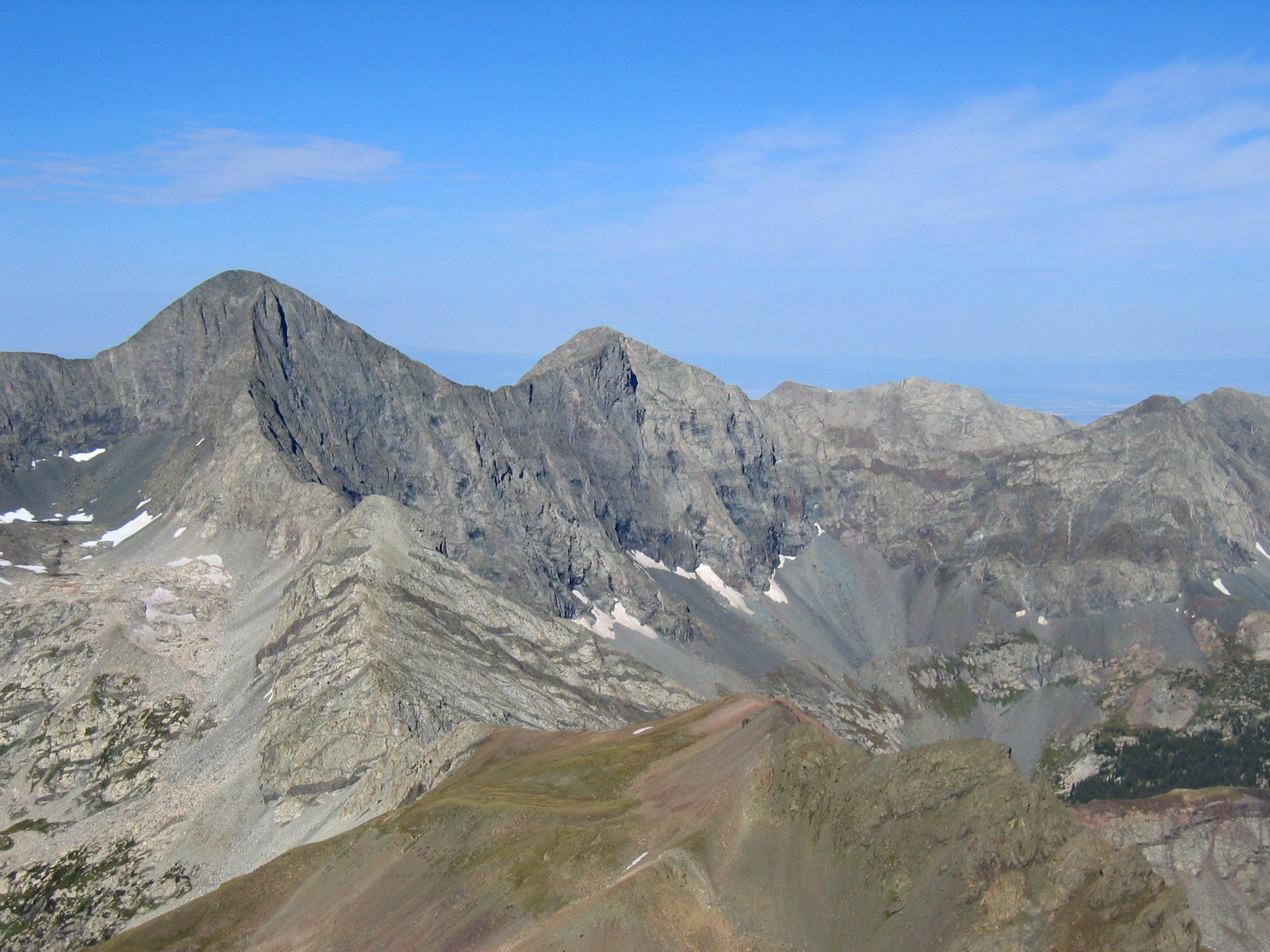
4. Blanca Peak is the highest summit of the Sangre de Cristo Mountains of Colorado.

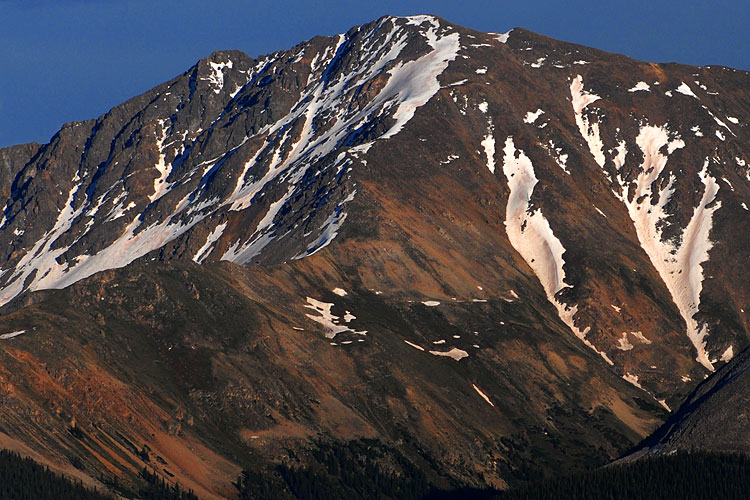
5. La Plata Peak in the Collegiate Peaks of Colorado is the fifth highest summit of the Rocky Mountains.

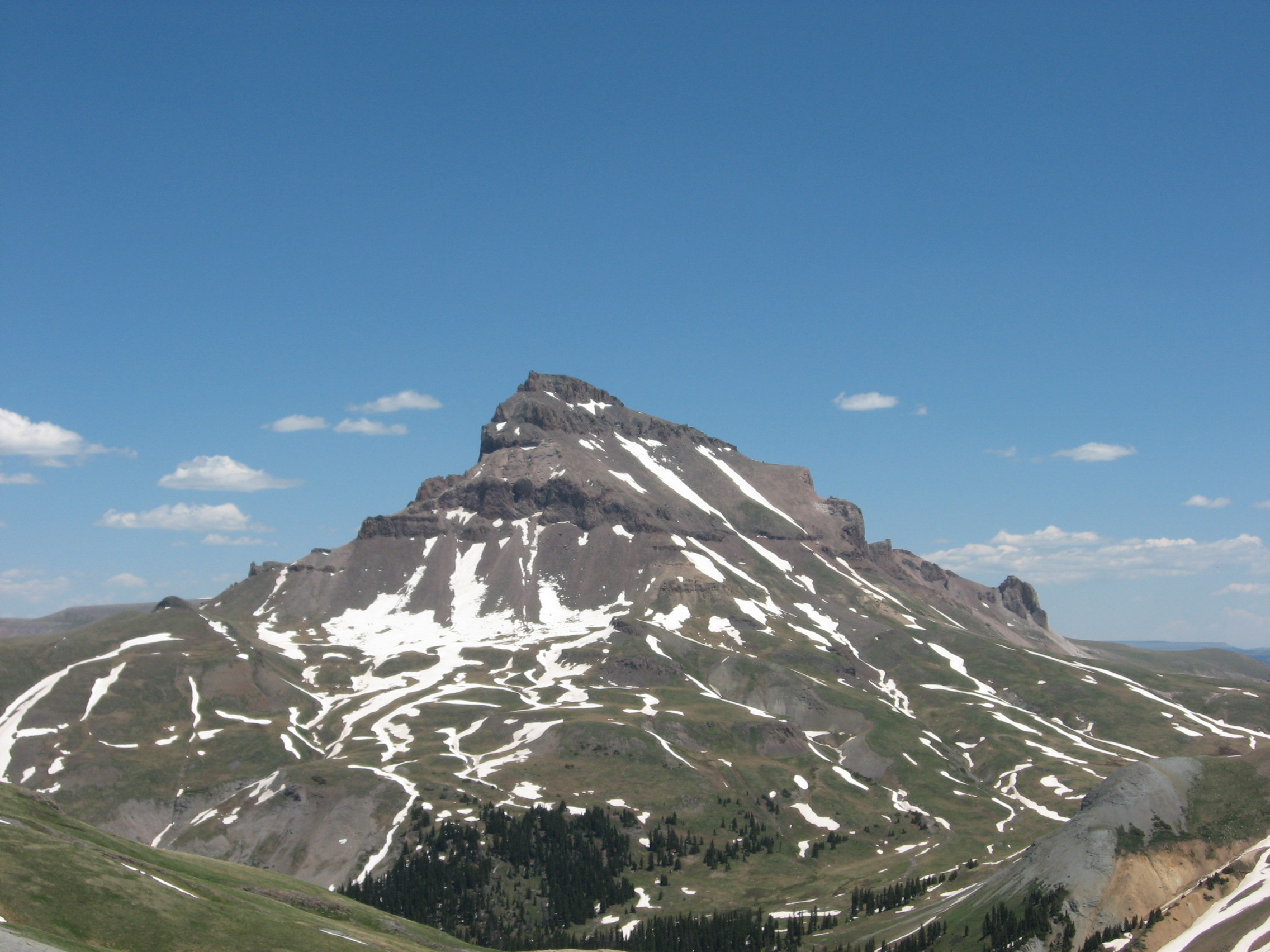
6. Uncompahgre Peak is the highest summit of the San Juan Mountains of Colorado.

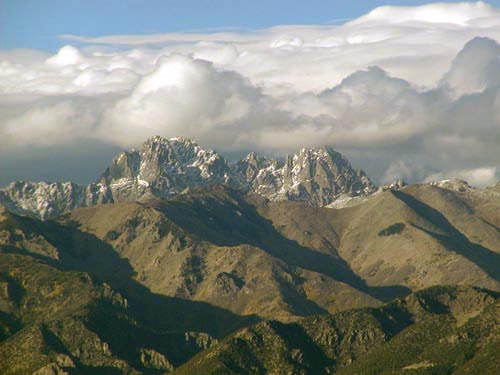
7. Crestone Peak is the highest summit of the Crestones of Colorado.

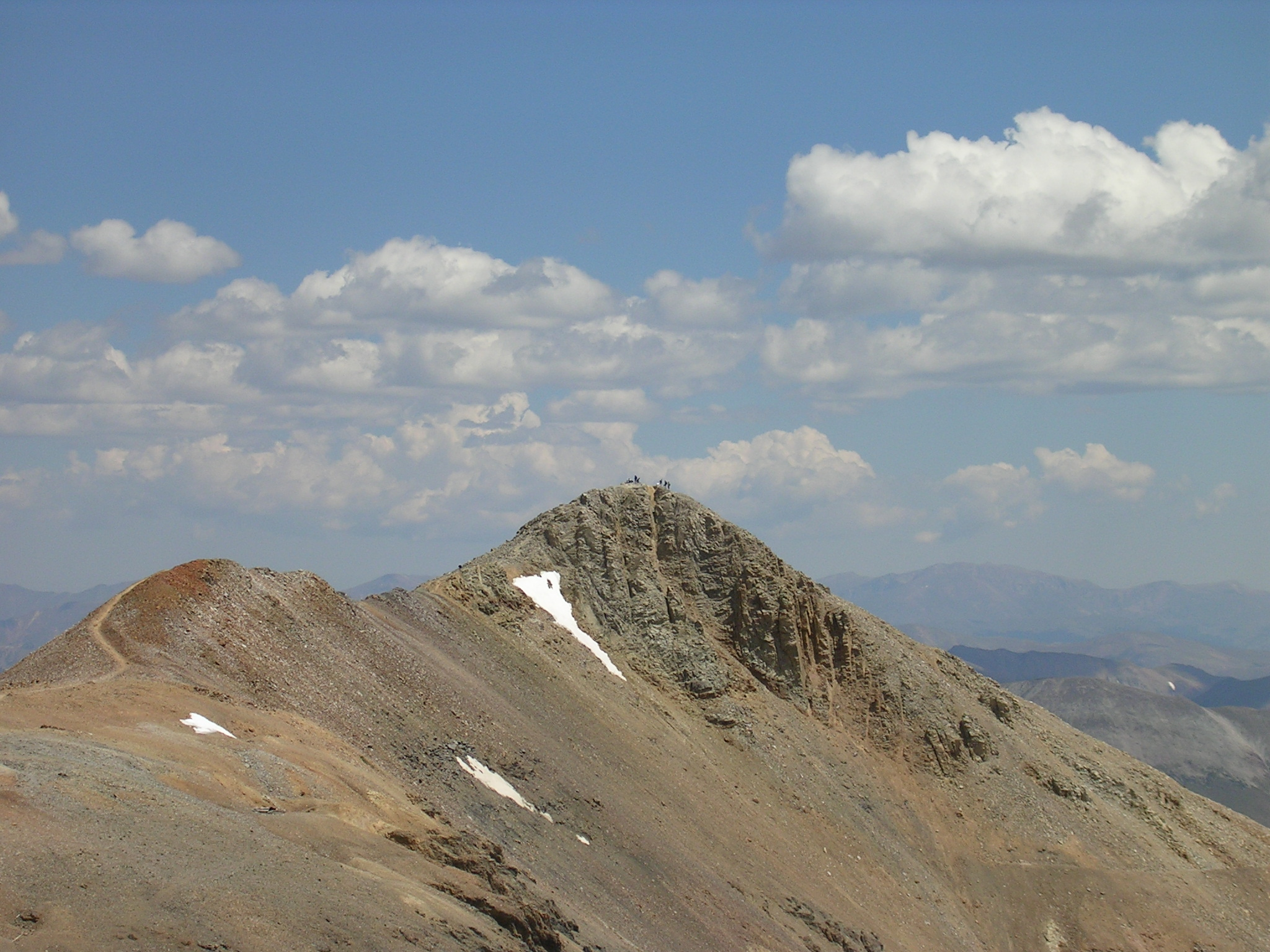
8. Mount Lincoln is the highest summit of the Mosquito Range of Colorado.

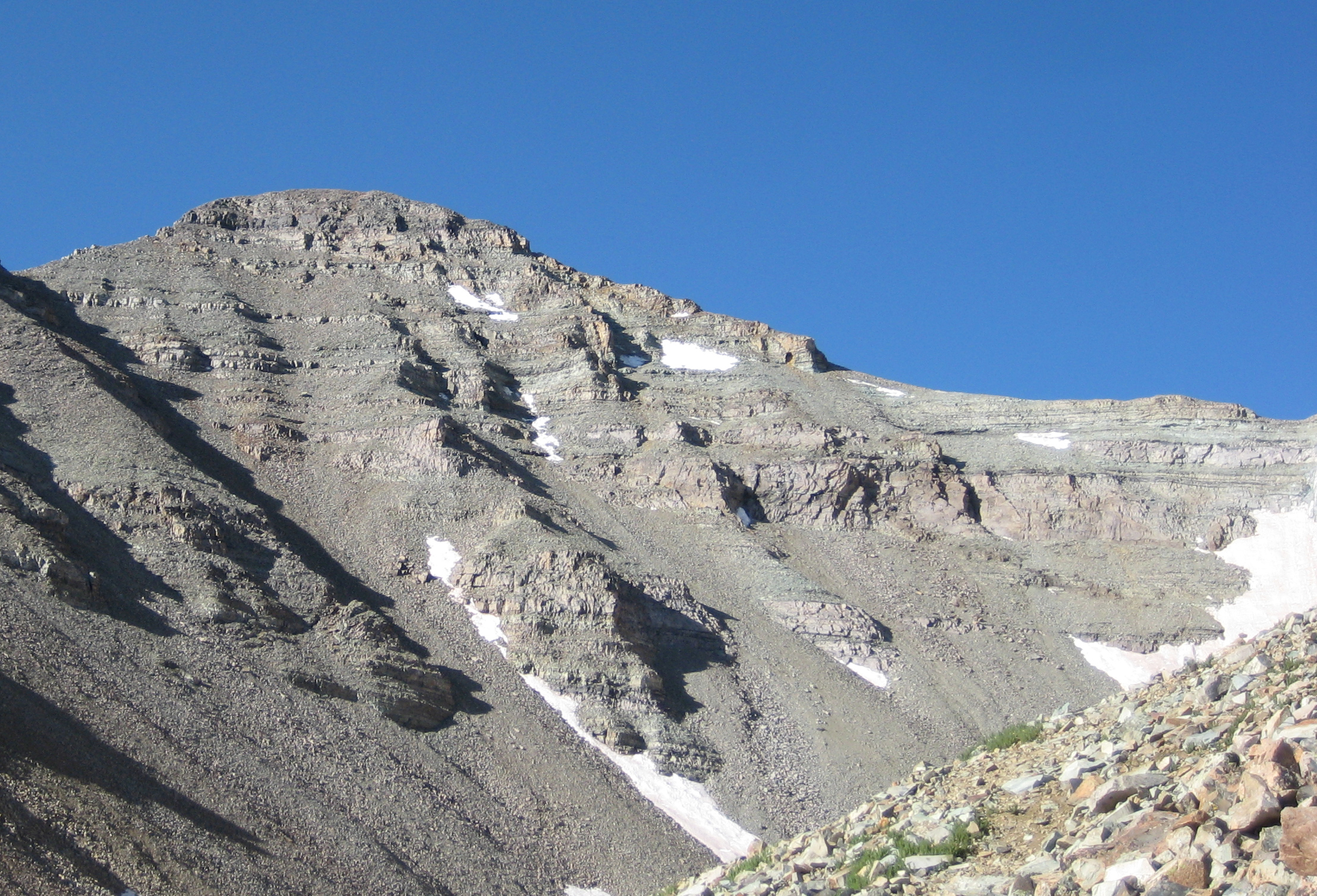
9. Castle Peak is the highest summit of the Elk Mountains of Colorado.

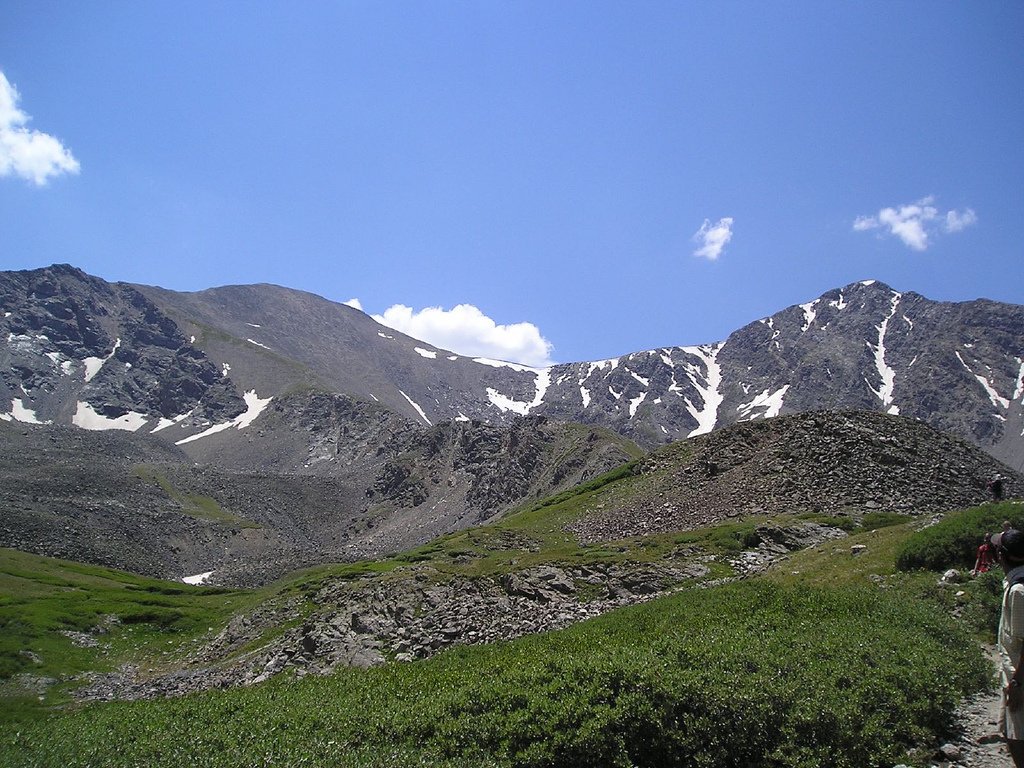
10. Grays Peak is the highest summit of the Front Range of Colorado and the highest point on the Continental Divide in North America.

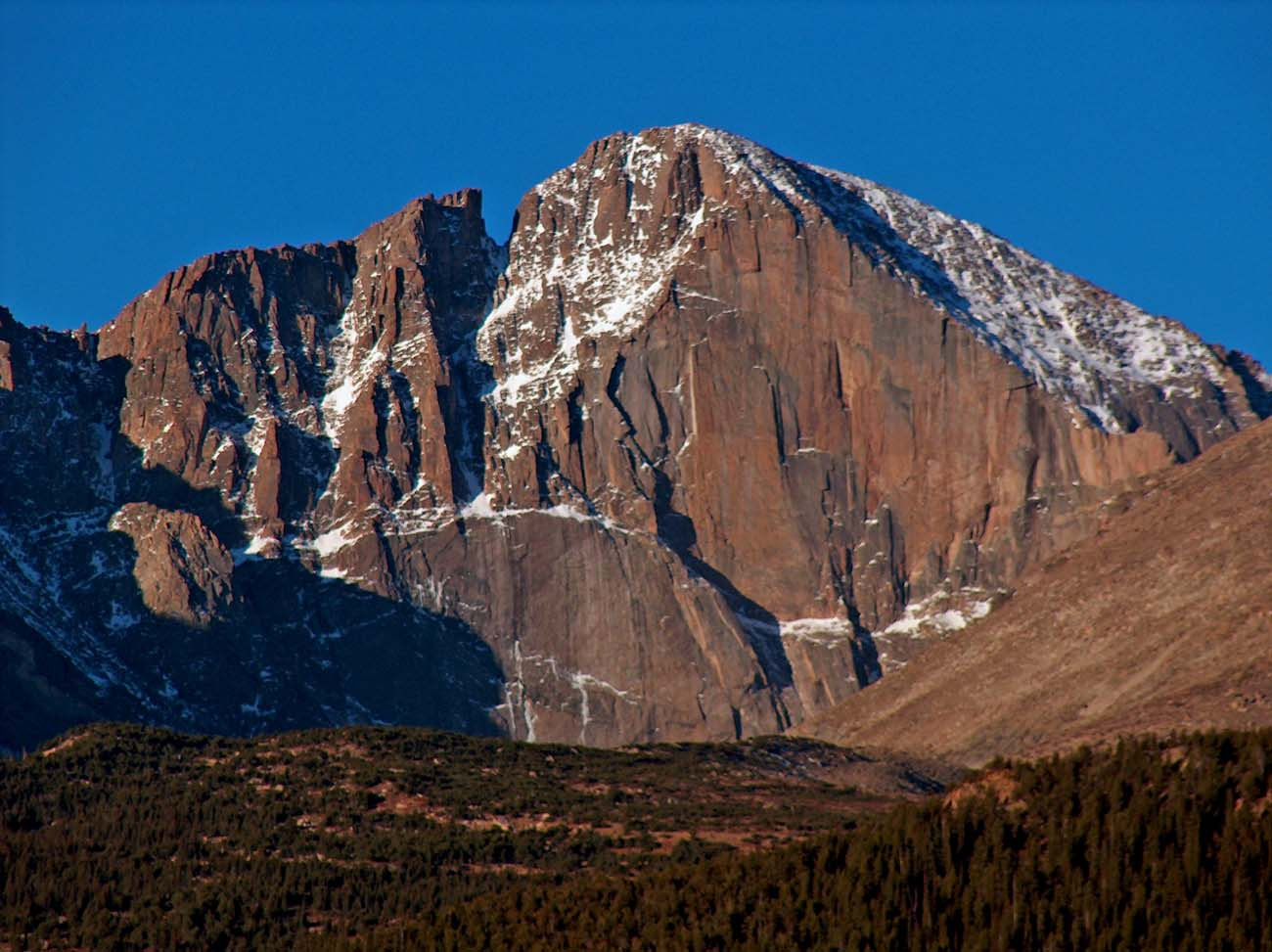
13. Longs Peak is the highest peak of the northern Front Range of Colorado.

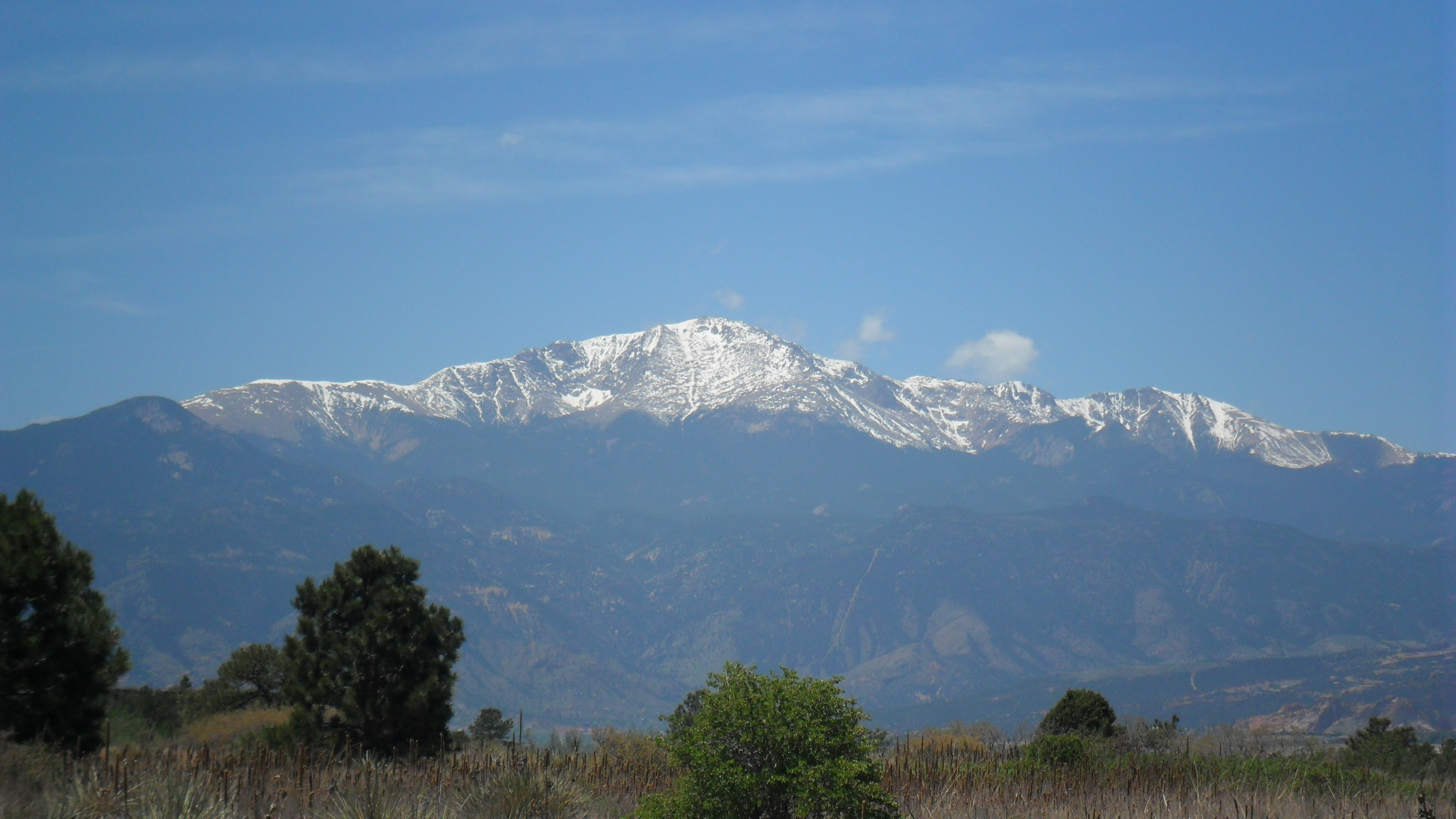
20. Pikes Peak in Colorado was the inspiration for America the Beautiful.

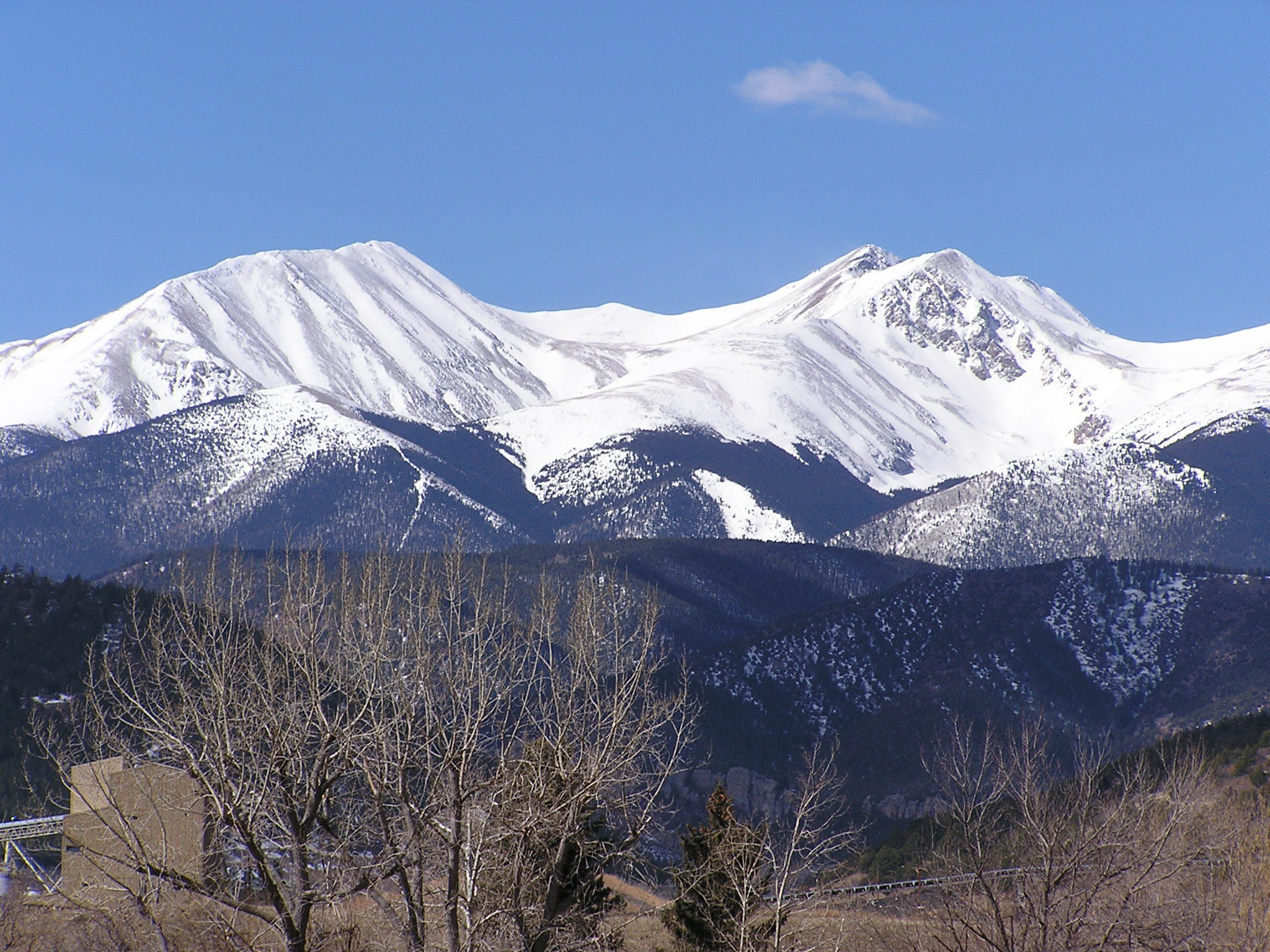
23. Culebra Peak in Colorado is the highest summit of the Culebra Range.

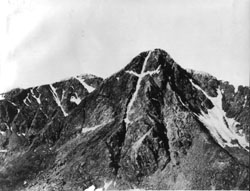
25. This photograph of the legendary Mount of the Holy Cross in Colorado was taken by William Henry Jackson in 1874.

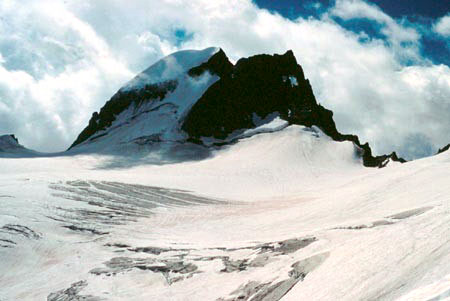
31. Gannett Peak is the highest summit of the Wind River Range, the U.S. State of Wyoming, and the Central Rocky Mountains.

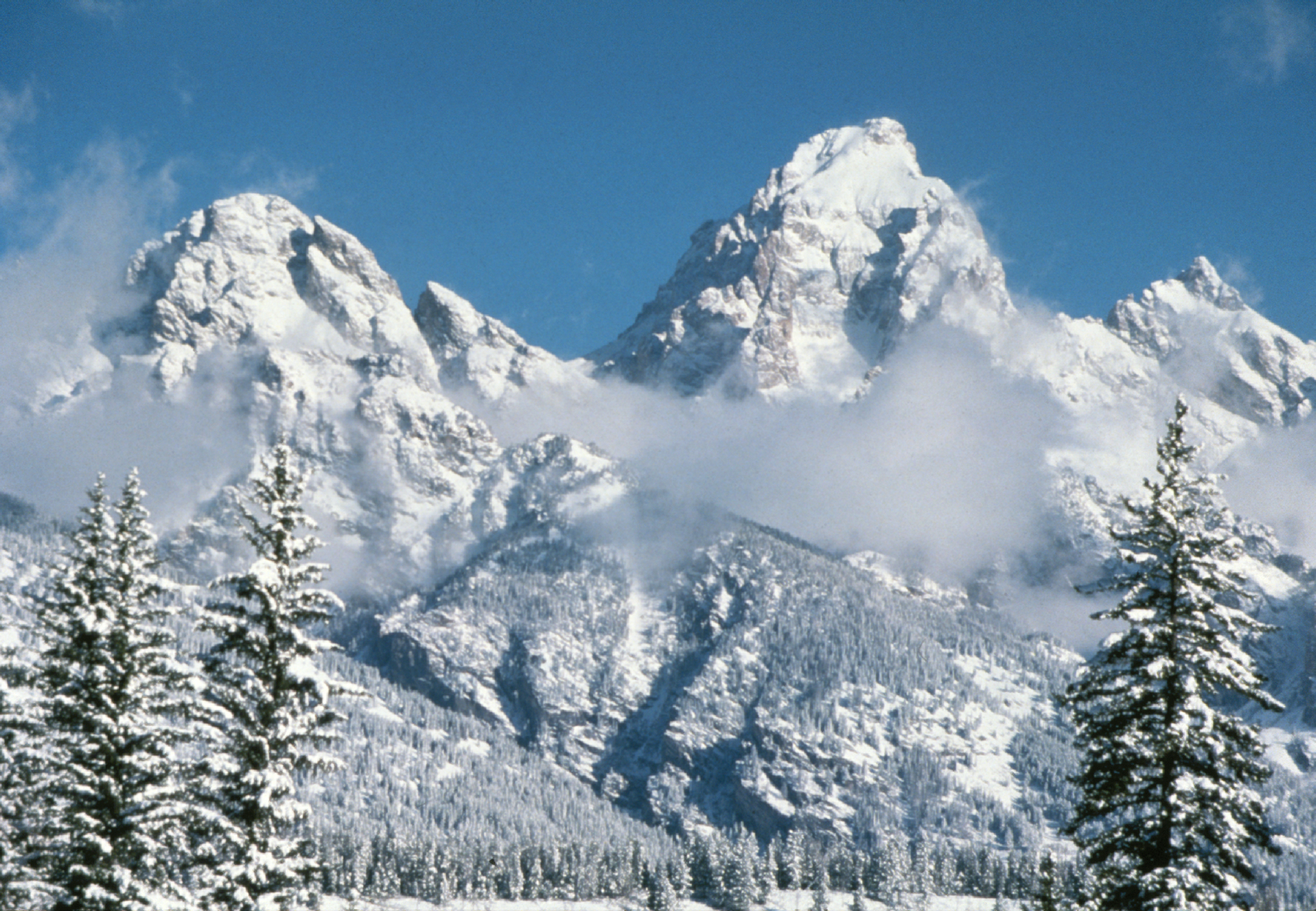
32. Grand Teton is the highest summit of the Teton Range of Wyoming.

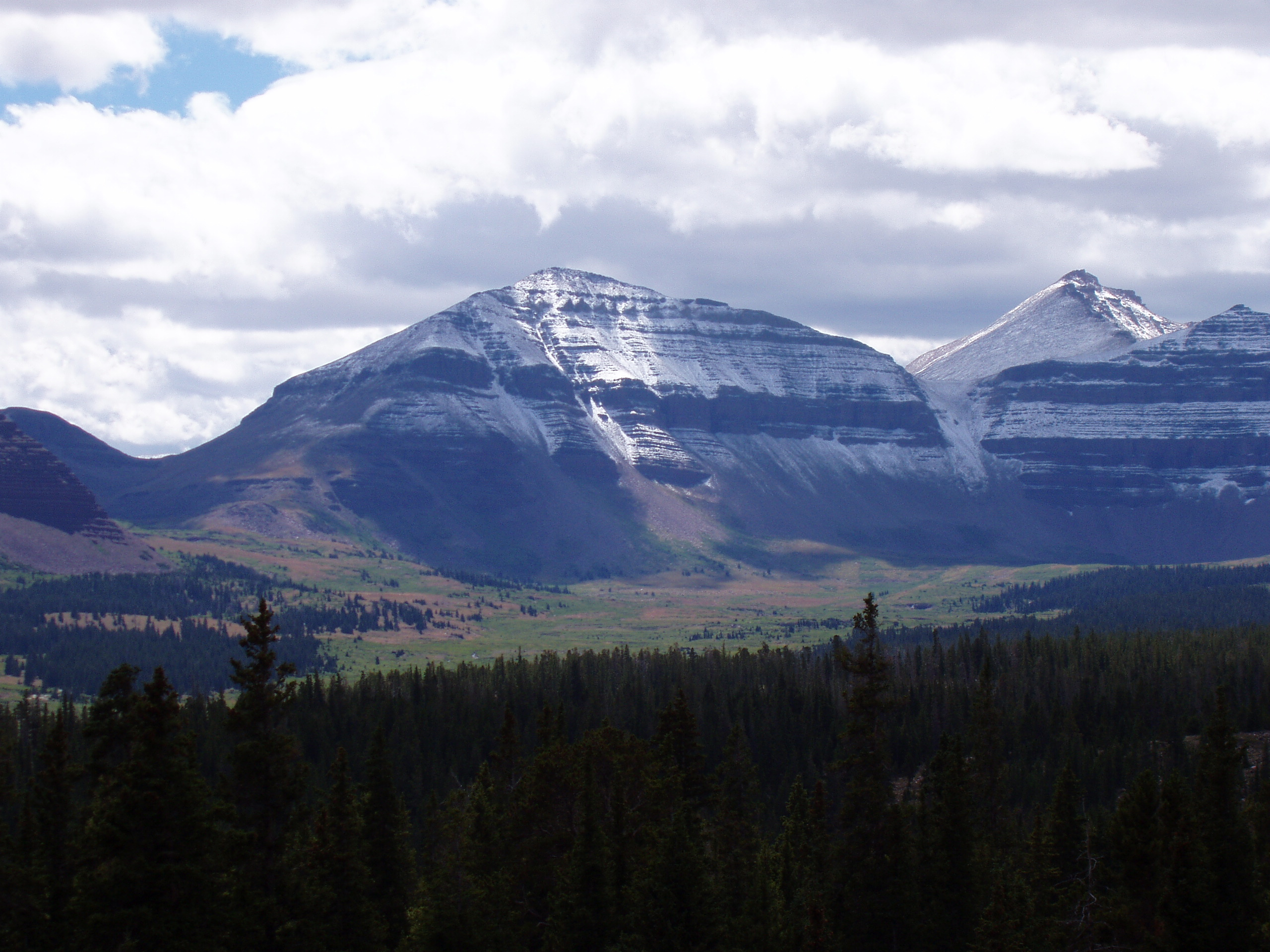
42. Kings Peak (at right) is the highest summit of the Uinta Mountains, the U.S. State of Utah, and the Western Rocky Mountains.

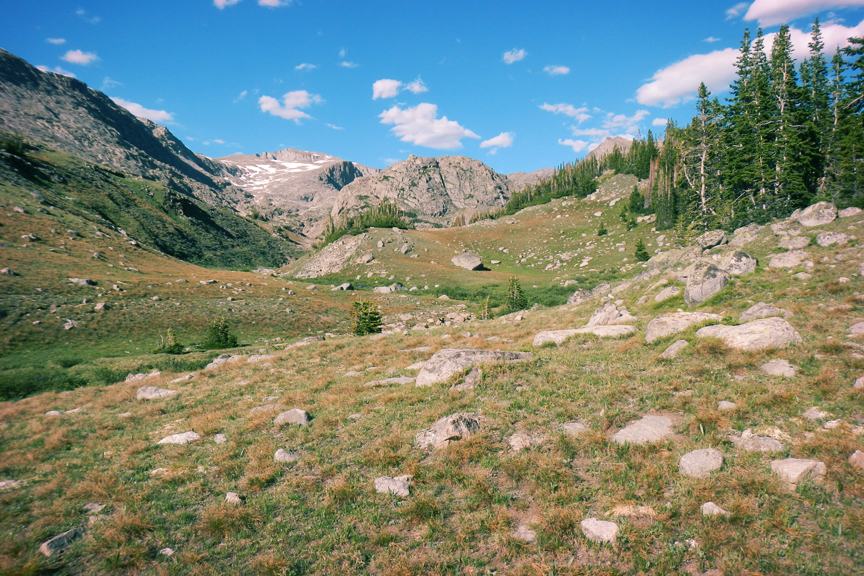
58. Cloud Peak is the highest summit of the Big Horn Mountains of Wyoming.

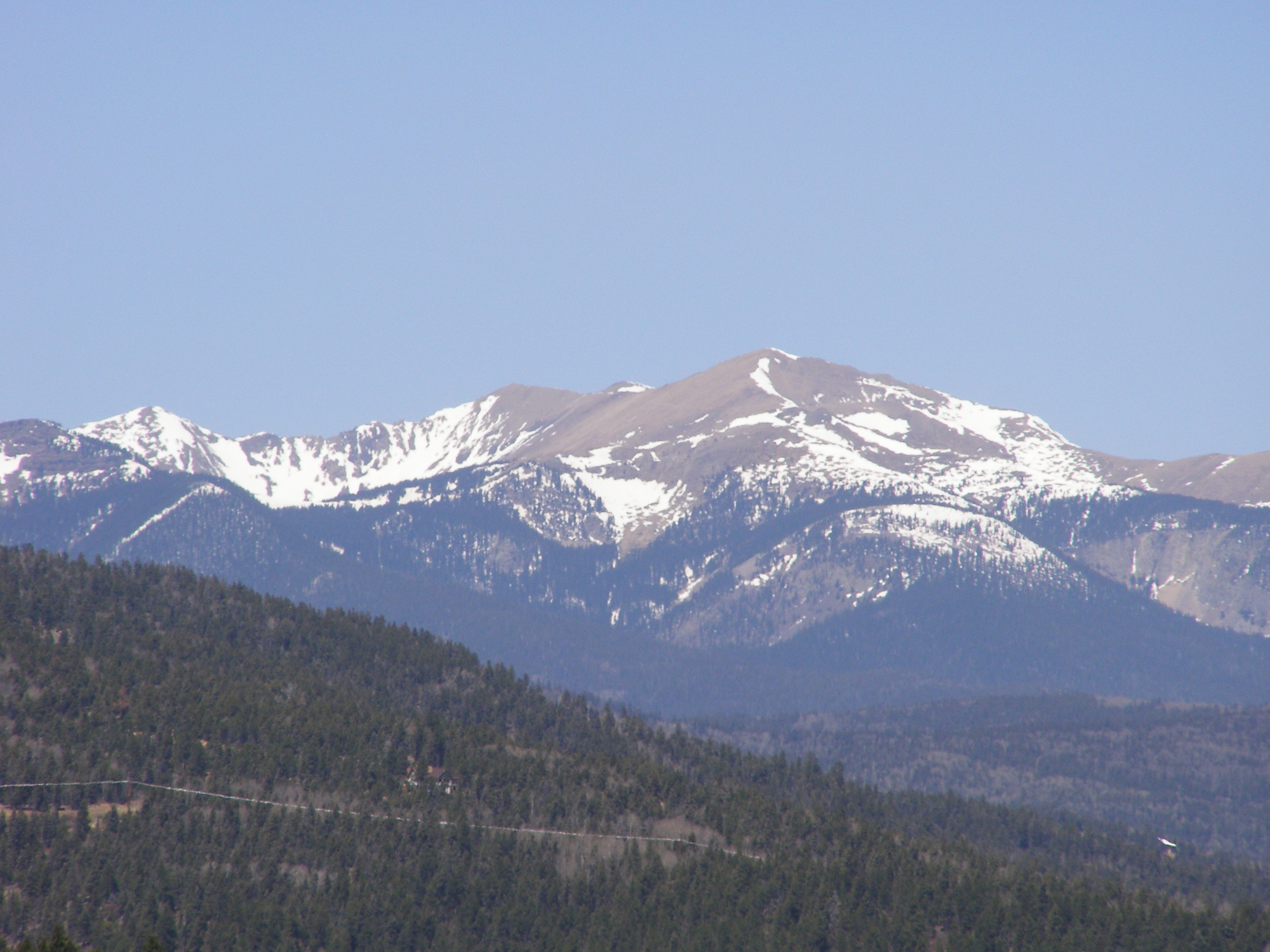
58. Wheeler Peak in the Sangre de Cristo Mountains is the highest point of the U.S. State of New Mexico.

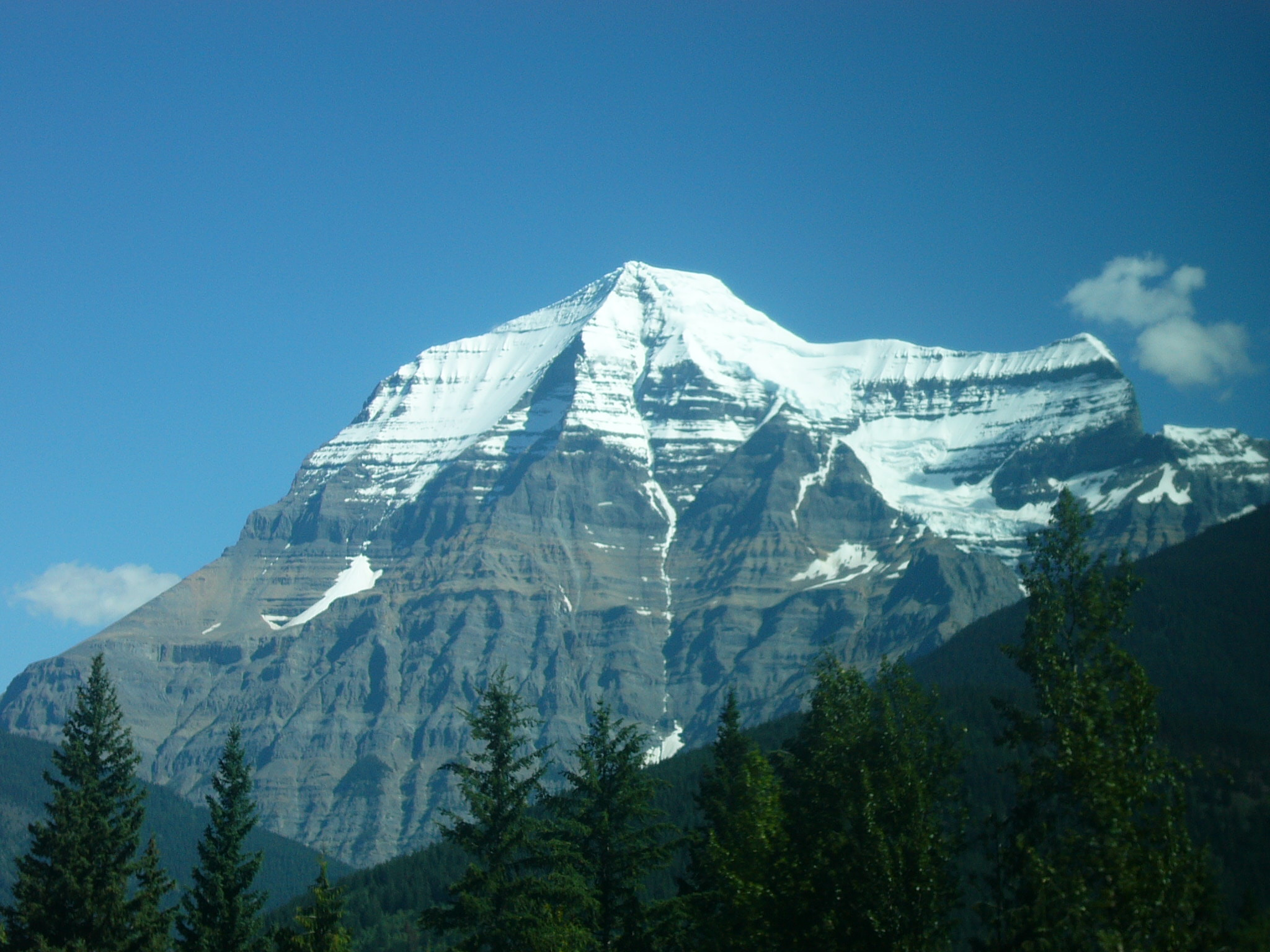
67. Mount Robson in British Columbia is the highest summit of the Canadian Rockies and the most prominent summit of the Rocky Mountains.

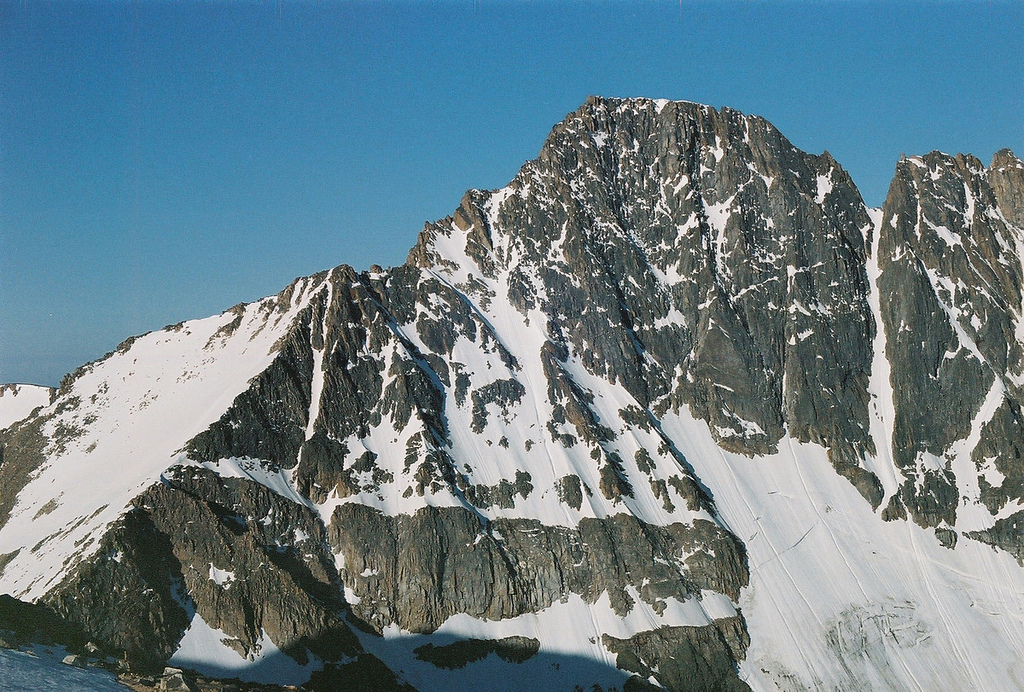
71. Granite Peak is the highest summit of the Beartooth Range and the U.S. State of Montana.

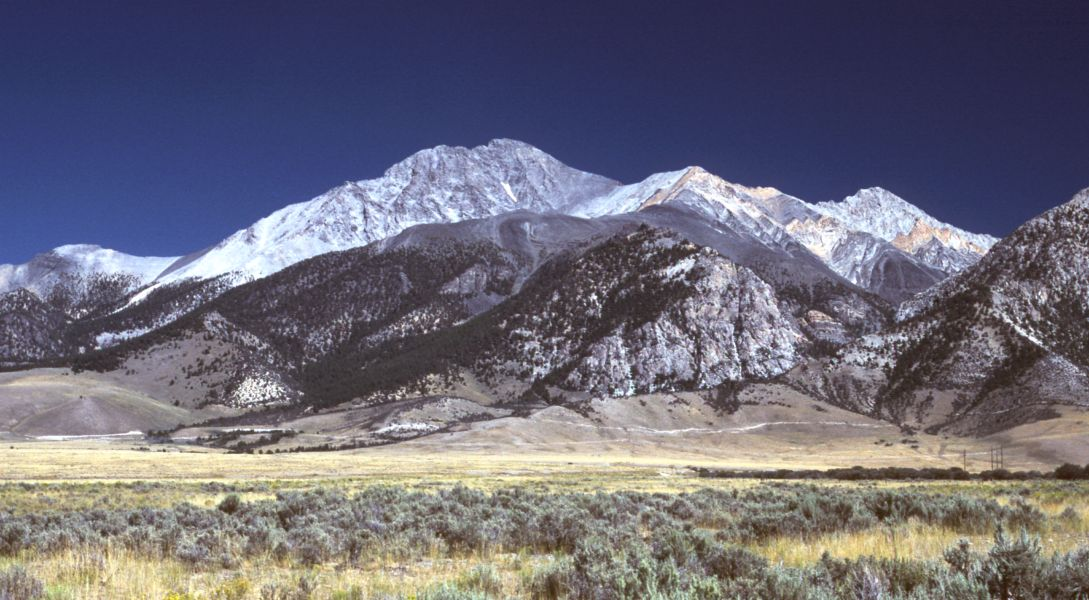
76. Borah Peak is the highest summit of the Lost River Range and the U.S. State of Idaho.

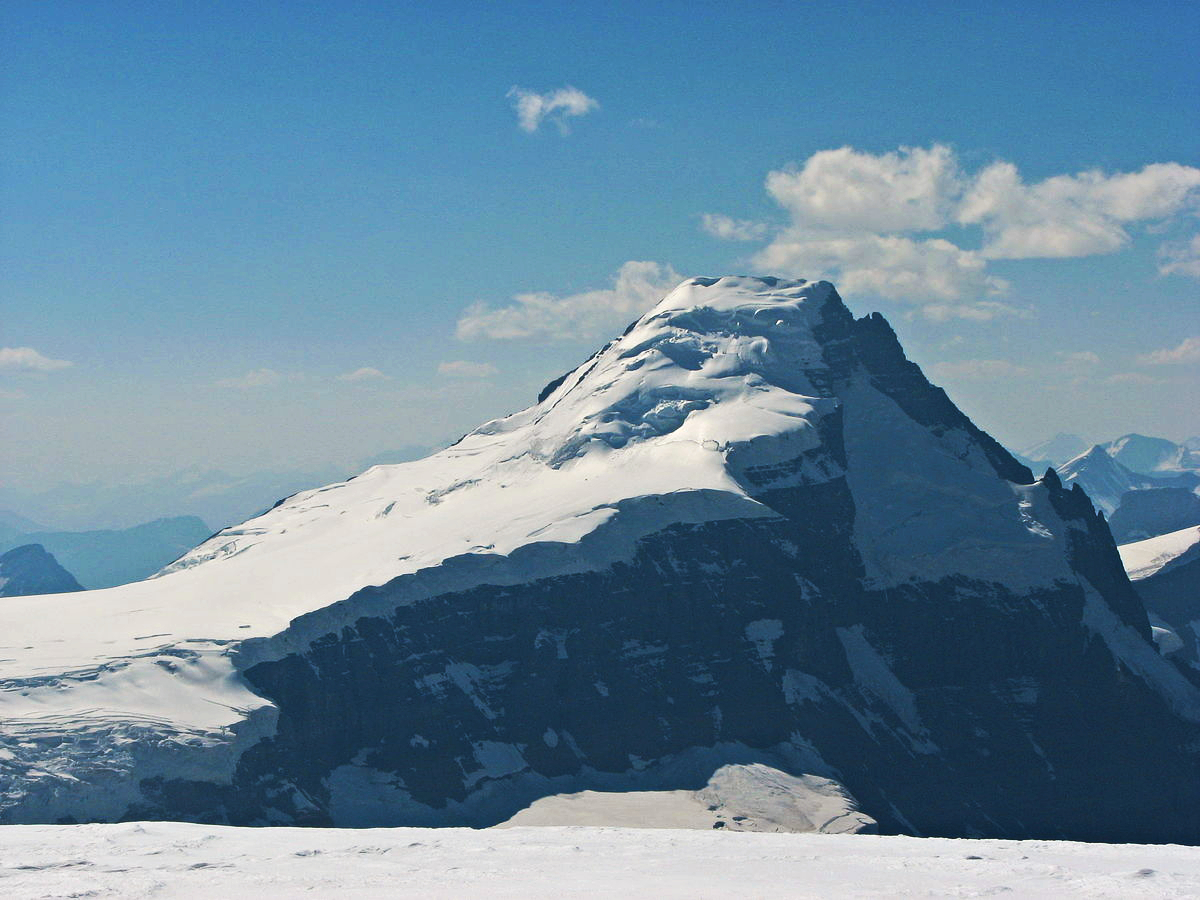
101. Mount Columbia on the Great Divide between Alberta and British Columbia is the highest point of the Canadian Province of Alberta.

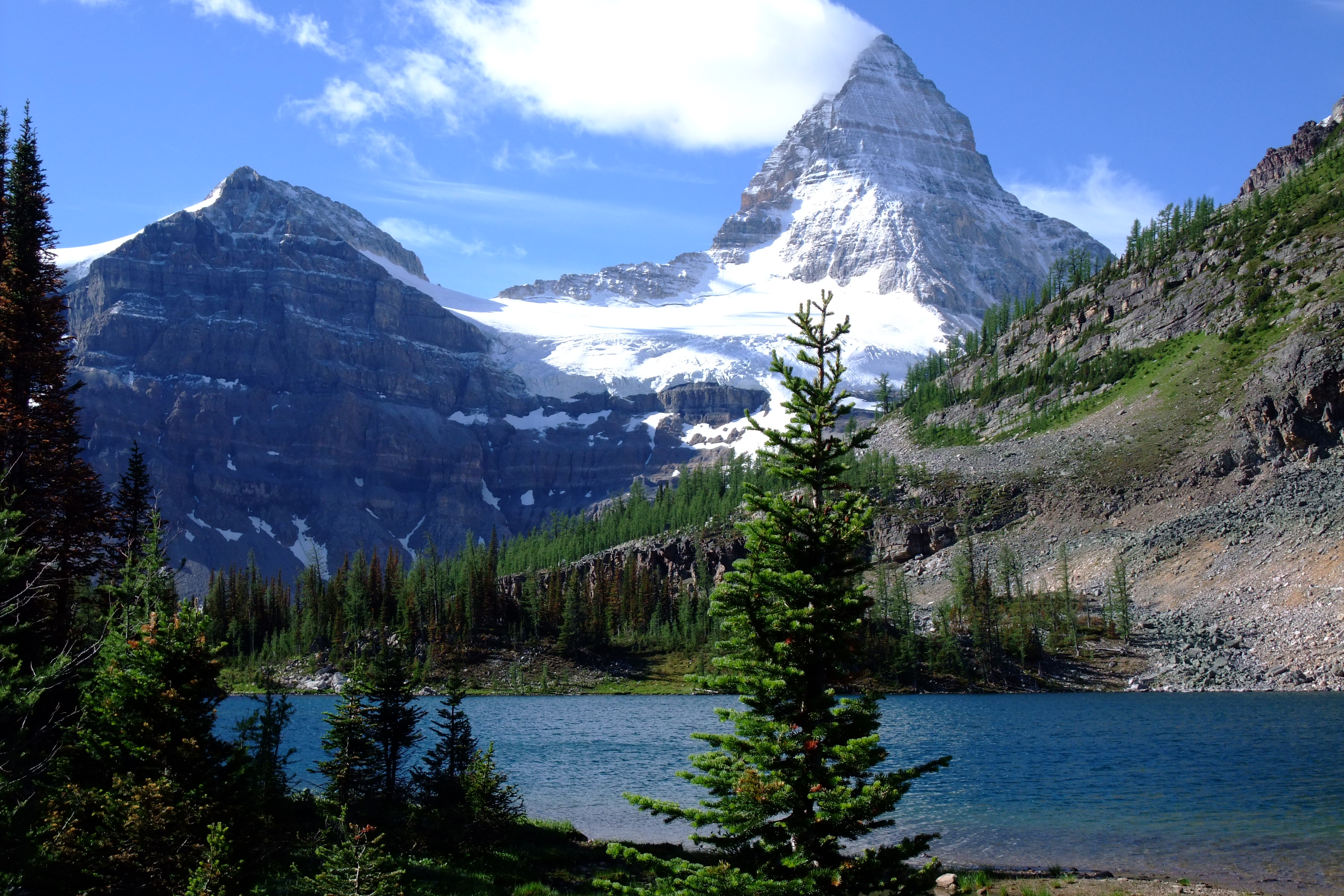
123. Mount Assiniboine on the Great Divide between Alberta and British Columbia is the highest summit of the Southern Continental Ranges.

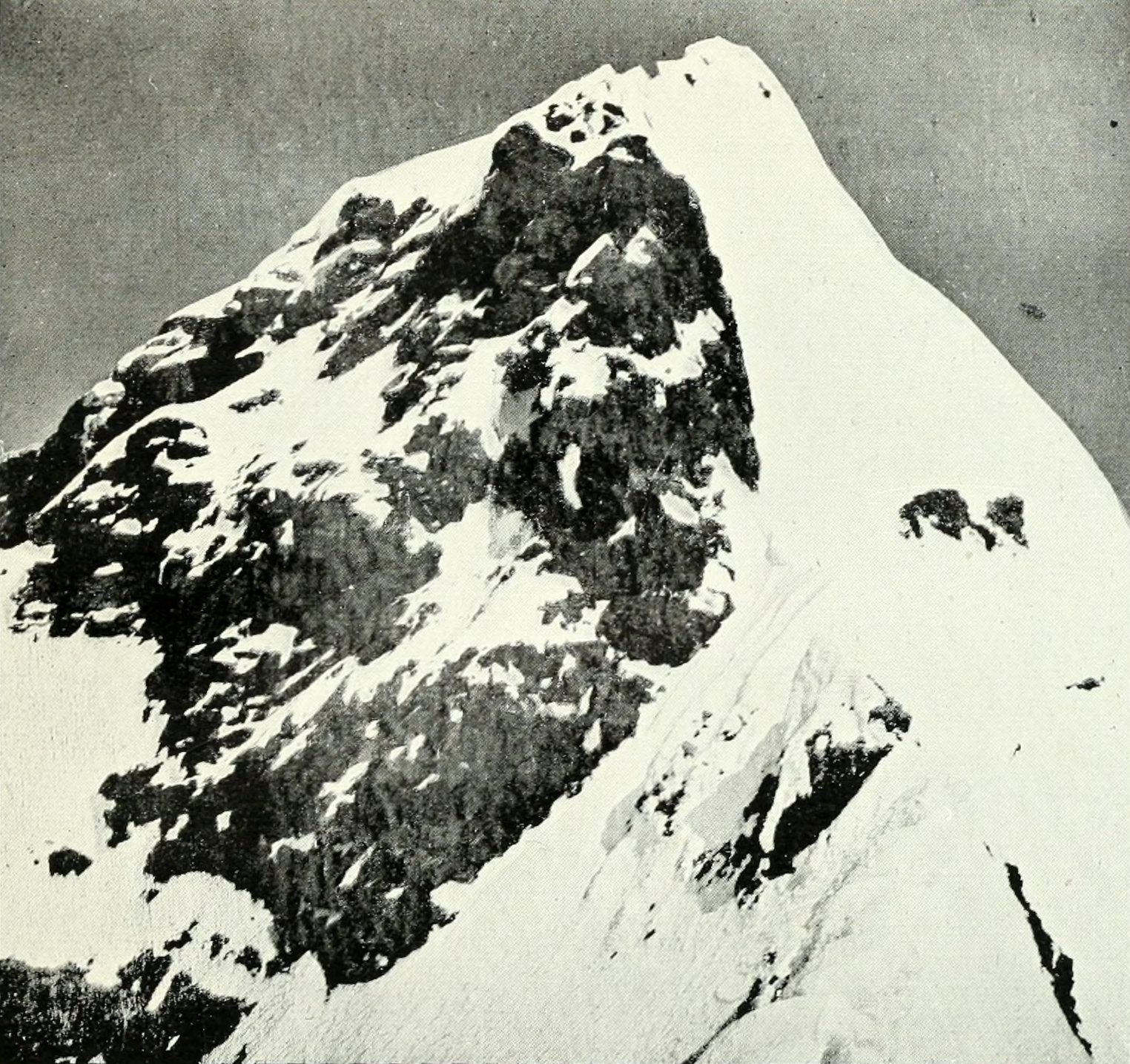
130. Mount Goodsir is the highest summit of the Ottertail Range of British Columbia.

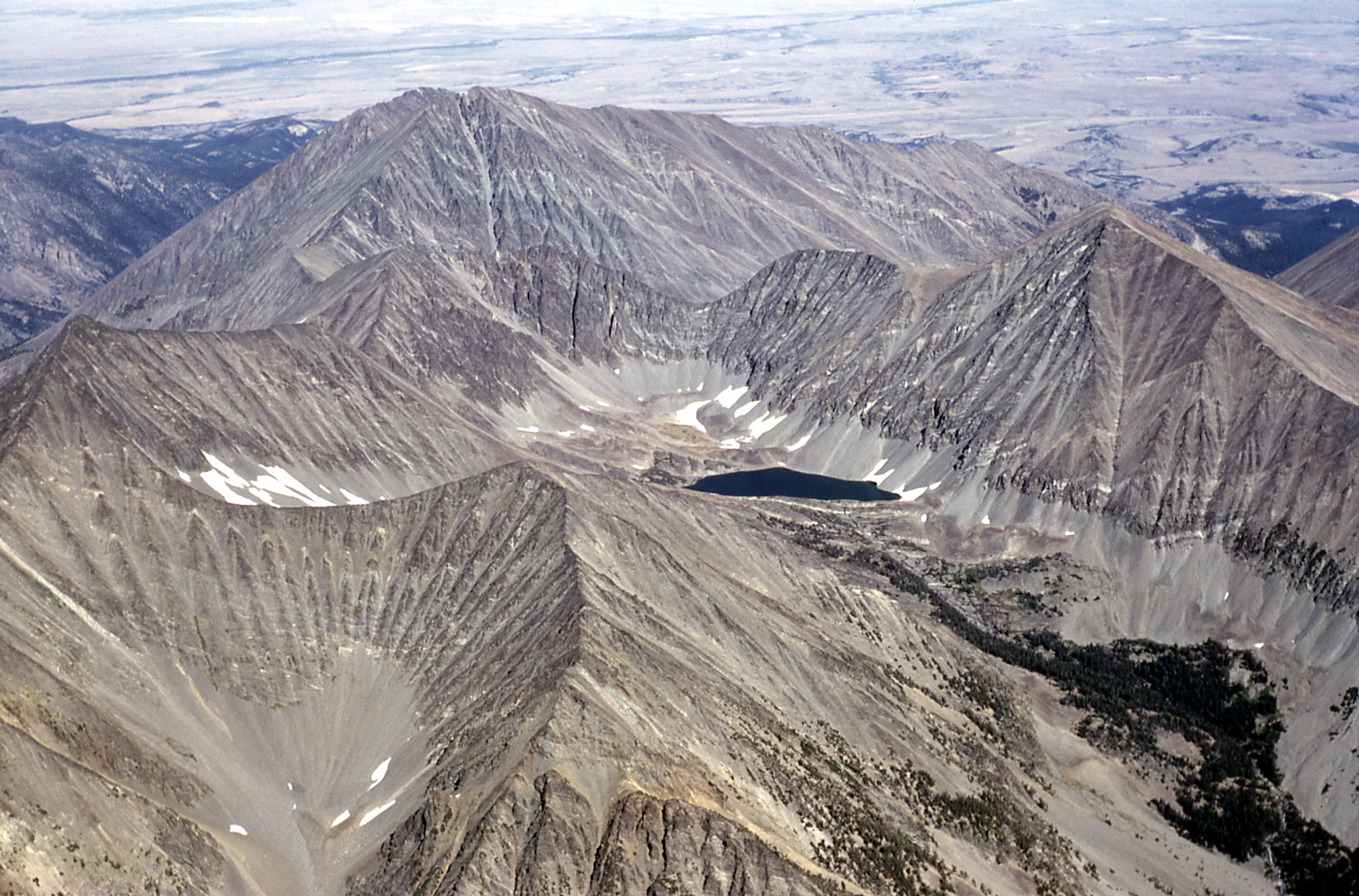
149. Crazy Peak is the highest summit of the Crazy Mountains of Montana.

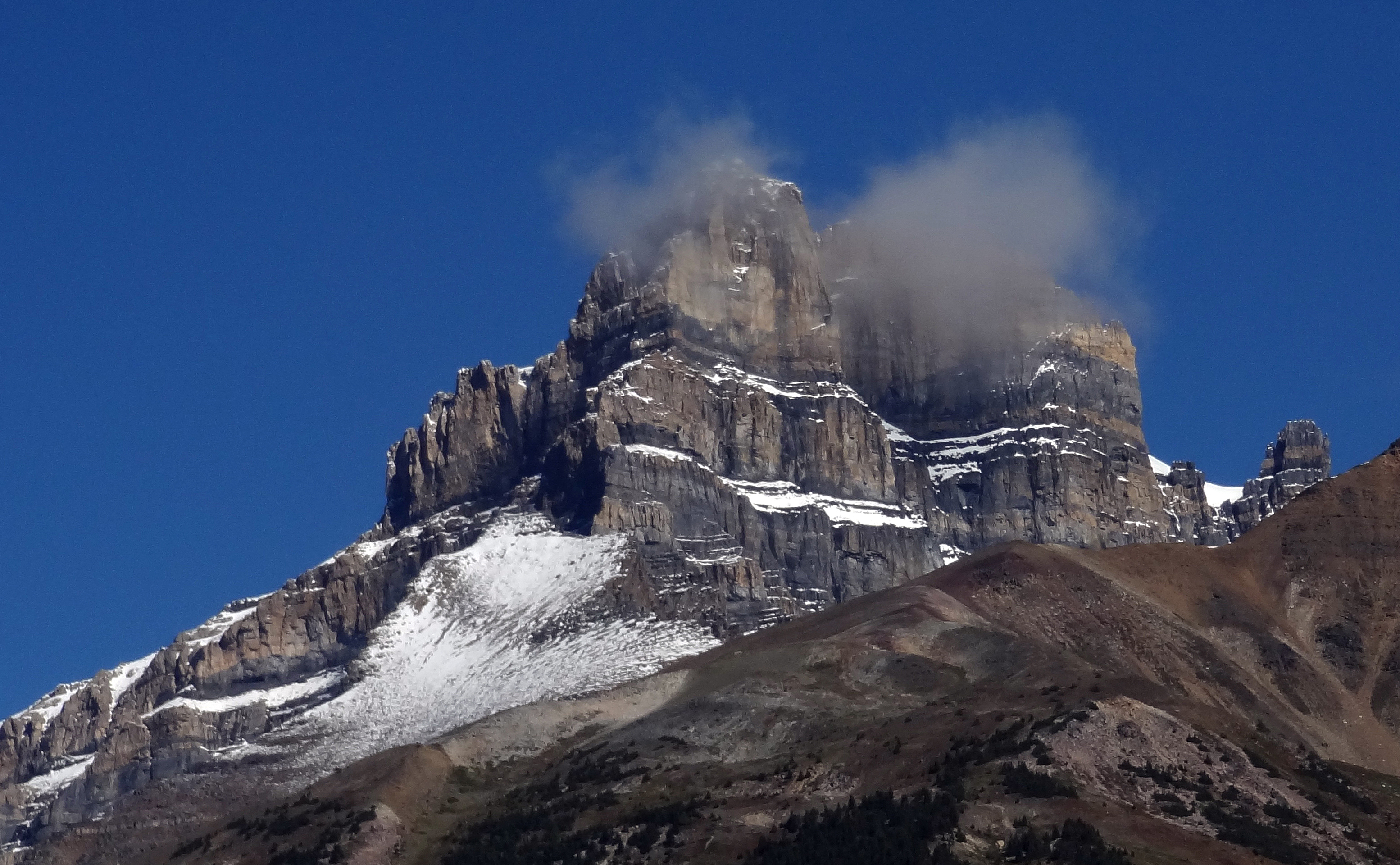
154. Mount Hector is the highest summit of the Murchison Group of Alberta.

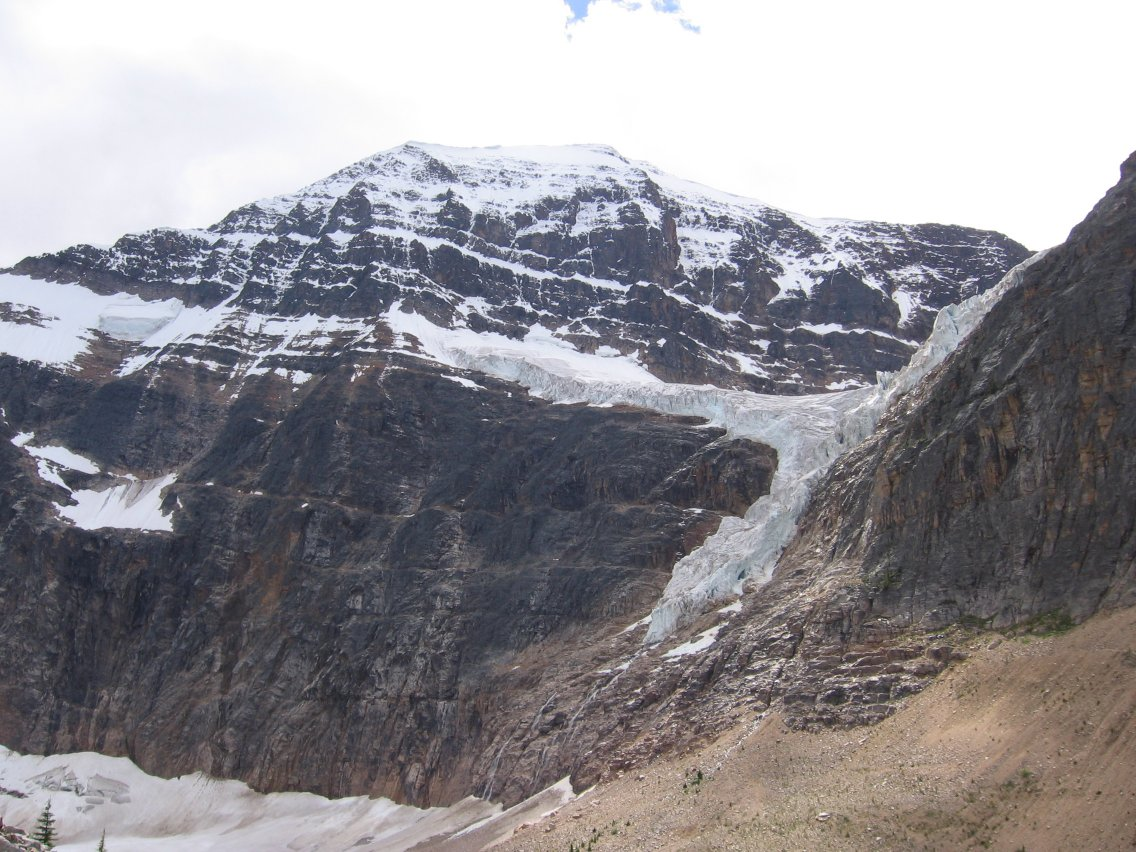
156. Mount Edith Cavell is the highest summit of the South Jasper Ranges of Alberta.

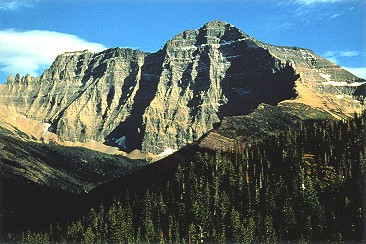
172. Mount Cleveland is the highest summit of the Lewis Range of Montana.

== See also ==
- Rocky Mountains
  - Geology of the Rocky Mountains
    - Category:Rocky Mountains
      - commons:Category:Rocky Mountains
- List of mountain peaks of North America
  - List of mountain peaks of Greenland
  - List of mountain peaks of Canada
  - List of mountain peaks of the Rocky Mountains
    - List of the major 4000-meter summits of the Rocky Mountains
    - List of the major 3000-meter summits of the Rocky Mountains
    - List of the ultra-prominent summits of the Rocky Mountains
    - List of the major 100-kilometer summits of the Rocky Mountains
    - List of extreme summits of the Rocky Mountains
  - List of mountain peaks of the United States
  - List of mountain peaks of México
  - List of mountain peaks of Central America
  - List of mountain peaks of the Caribbean
- Physical geography
  - Topography
    - Topographic elevation
    - Topographic prominence
    - Topographic isolation
