= Bill Williams Peak =

Mountain summit in Pitkin County, Colorado, United States

- Location within Colorado Location within the United States

Highest point
- Elevation: 13,389 feet (4,081 m)
- Prominence: 1,682 feet (513 m)
- Isolation: 3.71 miles (5.97 km)
- Listing: 42nd highest major summit of Colorado; 45th highest major summit of the Rocky Mountains; 82nd highest major summit of the United States; 101st highest major summit of North America
- Coordinates: 39.1806°N 106.6102°W

Geography
- Location: Pitkin County, Colorado, U.S.
- Parent range: Williams Mountains
- Topo map: USGS Mount Champion

Bill Williams Peak, elevation 13,389 feet (4,081 m), is an (officially unnamed) mountain located in Pitkin County, Colorado, United States. The summit of the mountain is the high point of the Williams Mountains, a subrange of the Sawatch Range. The summit is located 12.2 miles (19.6 km) east of Aspen, Colorado, in the Hunter–Fryingpan Wilderness of White River National Forest. Bill Williams Peak is the 42nd highest major summit of Colorado and the 45th highest major summit of the Rocky Mountains of the United States and Canada.

== Etymology ==
The mountain and its range are named for William Sherley "Old Bill" Williams (1787–1849), prominent American mountain man and frontiersman who frequented the region.

In November 1848, John C. Fremont hired Williams to guide his ill-fated fourth expedition through the Southern Rocky Mountains. Fremont sought to find a railroad route through the Rockies along the 38th parallel north. Williams warned Fremont against following his intended route through the La Garita Mountains in winter, but Fremont proceeded with his 35 men and 150 mules. The expedition eventually became hopelessly mired in deep snow and 11 men and all but a few of the pack animals died. Williams led a rescue party south towards Taos, and the survivors of the expedition eventually managed to follow.

In March, Williams and Dr. Benjamin Kern returned to the La Garita Mountains in hopes of finding more survivors. On March 14, 1849, Ute warriors murdered Bill Williams and Dr. Kern in the mountains by for trespassing on Ute lands.

== Climbing ==
In August 2024, a 33-year old climber was fatally injured after falling 50-100 feet from Williams Peak. The climber was able to send their location to rescuers via a GPS device, however the climber had succumbed to their injuries by the time rescuers arrived.

== See also ==
- Bibliography of Colorado
- Geography of Colorado
- History of Colorado
- Index of Colorado-related articles
- List of Colorado-related lists
  - List of mountain peaks of Colorado
- Outline of Colorado
