= Williams Mountains =

Mountain range in Pitkin County, Colorado, United States

- Location within Colorado Location within the United States

Highest point
- Peak: Bill Williams Peak
- Elevation: 13,389 feet (4,081 m)
- Coordinates: 39.1806°N 106.6102°W

Geography
- Location: Pitkin County, Colorado, U.S.
- Parent range: Sawatch Range
- Topo map: USGS Mount Champion

The Williams Mountains are a subrange of the Sawatch Range of the Rocky Mountains of the United States and Canada. The mountains are located in Pitkin County, Colorado. The apex of the range is 13,389-foot (4,081 m) Bill Williams Peak located 12.2 miles (19.6 km) east of Aspen, Colorado, in the Hunter–Fryingpan Wilderness of White River National Forest.

== Etymology ==
The Williams Mountains are named for William Sherley "Old Bill" Williams (1787–1849), prominent American mountain man and frontiersman who frequented the region.

In November 1848, John C. Fremont hired Williams to guide his ill-fated fourth expedition through the Southern Rocky Mountains. Fremont sought to find a railroad route through the Rockies along the 38th parallel north. Williams warned Fremont against following his intended route through the La Garita Mountains in winter, but Fremont proceeded with his 35 men and 150 mules. The expedition eventually became hopelessly mired in deep snow and 11 men and all but a few of the pack animals died. Williams led a rescue party south towards Taos, and the survivors of the expedition eventually managed to follow.

In March, Williams and Dr. Benjamin Kern returned to the La Garita Mountains in hopes of finding more survivors. On March 14, 1849, Ute warriors murdered Bill Williams and Dr. Kern in the mountains for trespassing on Ute lands.

== See also ==
- Bibliography of Colorado
- Geography of Colorado
- History of Colorado
- Index of Colorado-related articles
- List of Colorado-related lists
  - List of mountain ranges of Colorado
- Outline of Colorado
