= Capitol Peak (Colorado) =

Mountain in Colorado, United States

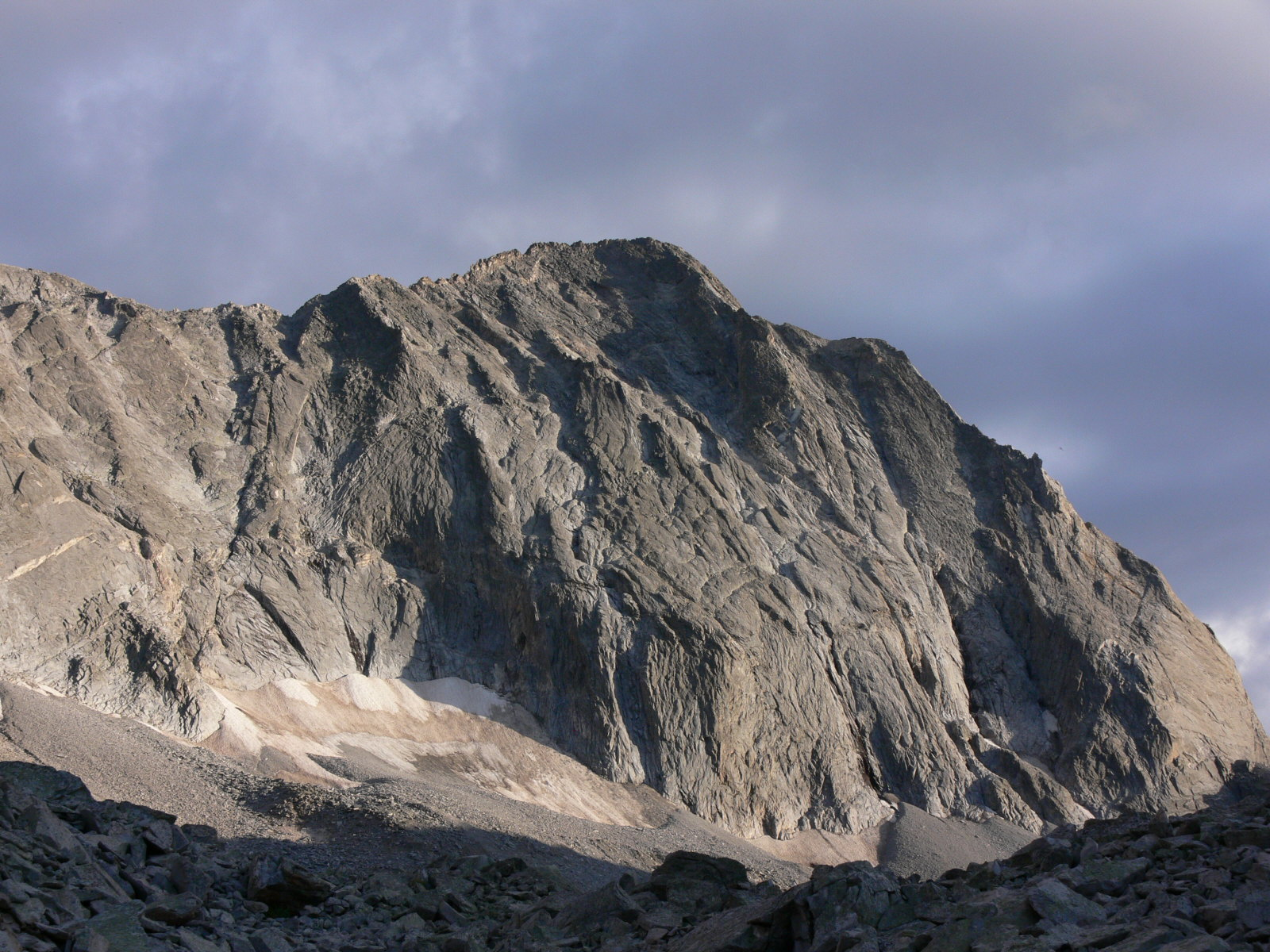
- Capitol Peak, from Capitol Lake

Highest point
- Elevation: 14,136 ft 4 in (4,308.75 m); NAPGD2022
- Prominence: 1,750 ft (530 m)
- Isolation: 7.44 mi (11.97 km)
- Listing: North America highest peaks 52nd; US highest major peaks 38th; Colorado highest major peaks 19th; Colorado fourteeners 29th
- Coordinates: 39°09′01″N 107°04′59″W

Geography
- Location within Colorado
- Location: Pitkin County, Colorado, U.S.
- Parent range: Elk Mountains
- Topo map(s): USGS 7.5' topographic map Capitol Peak, Colorado

Climbing
- First ascent: 1909 by Percy Hagerman and Harold Clark
- Easiest route: Northeast Ridge: Climb, class 4

Capitol Peak is a high and prominent mountain summit in the Elk Mountains range of the Rocky Mountains of North America. It is the 52nd-highest mountain in North America. The 14,136-foot-4-inch (4,309 m) fourteener is located in the Maroon Bells-Snowmass Wilderness of White River National Forest, 8.7 miles (14.0 km) east by south (bearing 104°) of the community of Redstone in Pitkin County, Colorado, United States.

== Mountain ==
Capitol Peak lies on the long ridge connecting the heart of the Elk Mountains with Mount Sopris to the northwest. Capitol Peak is notable for its impressive vertical relief, rising 7,500 feet (2,300 m) above the Roaring Fork Valley. Additionally, it rises nearly 6,000 ft (1,800 m) above Snowmass Village in just under 9 miles (14 km).

Capitol Peak is one of the most difficult of Colorado's fourteeners to climb. The only non-technical route, the Northeast Ridge, requires crossing the famously exposed "Knife Edge," the northeast ridge of Capitol. Fatalities have occurred on this route. Other routes require technical rock climbing, for example, the Northwest Buttress Route (Grade IV, Class 5.9). These routes have significant rockfall danger due to a great deal of loose rock; however, the rock is substantially more solid than on the more famous Maroon Bells or on Pyramid Peak.

Capitol Peak was first climbed on August 22, 1909 by Percy Hagerman and Harold Clark.

== Accidents ==
Capitol Peak is considered one of the most dangerous mountains to climb in the state of Colorado and the wider United States. It is ranked as the most deadly mountain in the United States in terms of fatality-to-accident ratio, with 91% of accidents being fatal from 1947 to 2018. In 2017, five people died on Capitol Peak within a six-week period.

== Capitol Peak Trail ==
Capitol Peak is a 15.1 mile lightly trafficked out and back trail located near Snowmass Village, Colorado that features a lake and is only recommended for very experienced adventurers. The trail is primarily used for hiking, rock climbing, and backpacking and is best used from July until September. Dogs are allowed to use this trail.

=== Camping ===
There is primitive camping near trail head in a designated site. No fee is required, but restrictions may exist.

There are several campsites near Capitol Lake. As of September 2022 all campsites in heavily impacted areas of the Maroon Bells-Snowmass Wilderness require permits obtained in advance.

=== Daly Pass ===
At the trail head, at an altitude of 9,400 feet, following several switchbacks for half a mile will lead you to Daly Pass. Daly Pass is the first point of interest on Capitol Peak. This pass is recognized for its saddle-shaped ridge reaching 12,480 feet.

=== K2 ===
K2 is known for often being confused by hikers with the Capitol Peak summit. Many hikers will go around K2 on the North side where it is most exposed, though climbing over K2 has become a popular alternative route.

=== Knife Edge ===
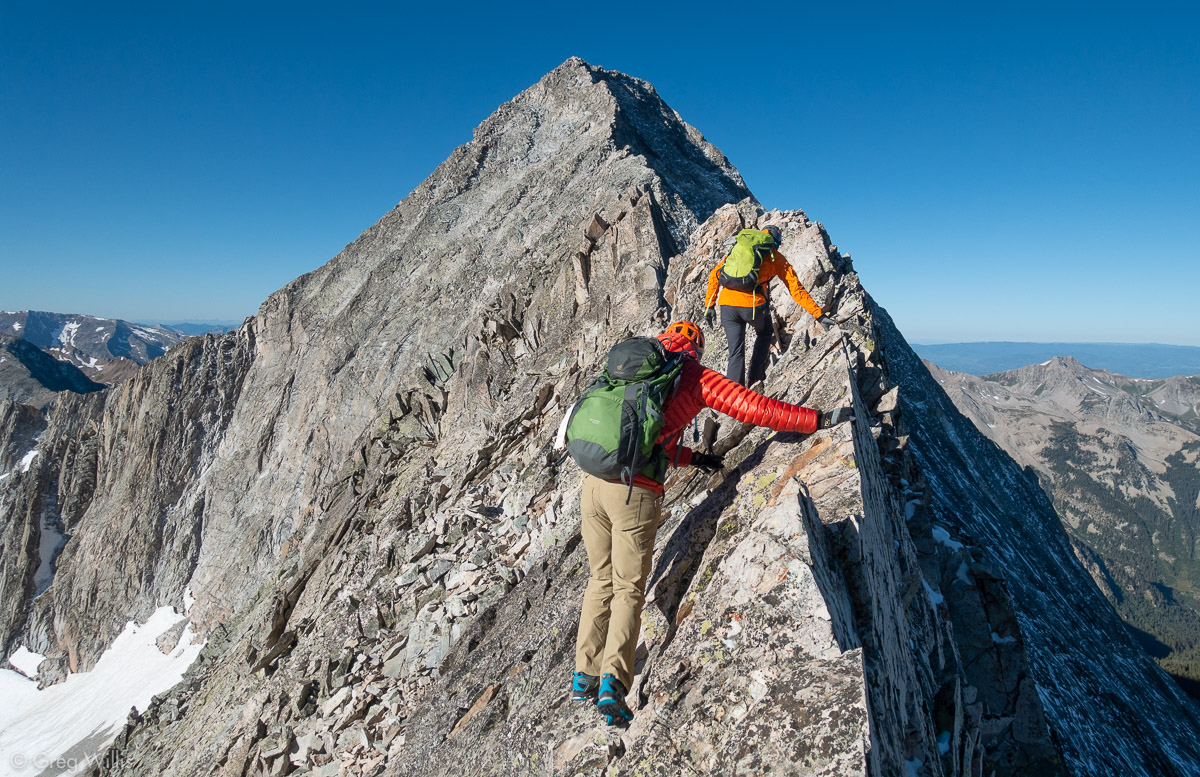
Capitol Peak Knife Edge

The Knife Edge (pictured right) is famous for its 150-foot length with 2,000 foot drops on both sides. It is regarded as the crux of the route due to the exposure.

=== Summit ===
The view from Capitol Peak's summit includes Pierre Lakes in the huge cirque to the east. To the south is Snowmass Mountain, another Fourteener, at the end of a long shattered ridge. Farther to the east are red-striated peaks, including the Maroon Bells, Pyramid Peak, and Castle Peak. The long ridge of the Continental Divide is to the east.

== Climate ==
Climate data for Capitol Peak 39.1513 N, 107.0837 W, Elevation: 13,307 ft (4,056 m) (1991–2020 normals)
Month	Jan	Feb	Mar	Apr	May	Jun	Jul	Aug	Sep	Oct	Nov	Dec	Year
Mean daily maximum °F (°C)	22.0 (−5.6)	21.4 (−5.9)	26.6 (−3.0)	31.3 (−0.4)	40.4 (4.7)	52.7 (11.5)	58.9 (14.9)	56.9 (13.8)	50.0 (10.0)	39.0 (3.9)	28.2 (−2.1)	22.0 (−5.6)	37.4 (3.0)
Daily mean °F (°C)	10.4 (−12.0)	9.4 (−12.6)	14.1 (−9.9)	18.7 (−7.4)	27.7 (−2.4)	39.0 (3.9)	45.5 (7.5)	43.8 (6.6)	36.8 (2.7)	26.7 (−2.9)	17.2 (−8.2)	10.8 (−11.8)	25.0 (−3.9)
Mean daily minimum °F (°C)	−1.1 (−18.4)	−2.6 (−19.2)	1.7 (−16.8)	6.1 (−14.4)	15.1 (−9.4)	25.4 (−3.7)	32.0 (0.0)	30.8 (−0.7)	23.5 (−4.7)	14.4 (−9.8)	6.2 (−14.3)	−0.4 (−18.0)	12.6 (−10.8)
Average precipitation inches (mm)	6.19 (157)	6.45 (164)	5.75 (146)	5.66 (144)	3.64 (92)	1.42 (36)	2.35 (60)	2.74 (70)	3.01 (76)	3.21 (82)	5.07 (129)	5.70 (145)	51.19 (1,301)
Average snowfall inches (cm)	50.1 (127)	39.6 (101)	58.8 (149)	45.1 (115)	20.6 (52)	3.8 (9.7)	0 (0)	0 (0)	4.9 (12)	20.3 (52)	43.0 (109)	50.8 (129)	337 (855.7)
Source 1: PRISM Climate Group
Source 2: Summitpost for snowfall

== Historical names ==
- Capital Peak
- Capitol Peak - by Hayden Survey who thought it looked similar to the U.S. Capitol building

== See also ==
- List of mountain peaks of North America
  - List of mountain peaks of the United States
    - List of mountain peaks of Colorado
      - List of Colorado fourteeners
