= Italian Mountain =

Mountain in Colorado, United States

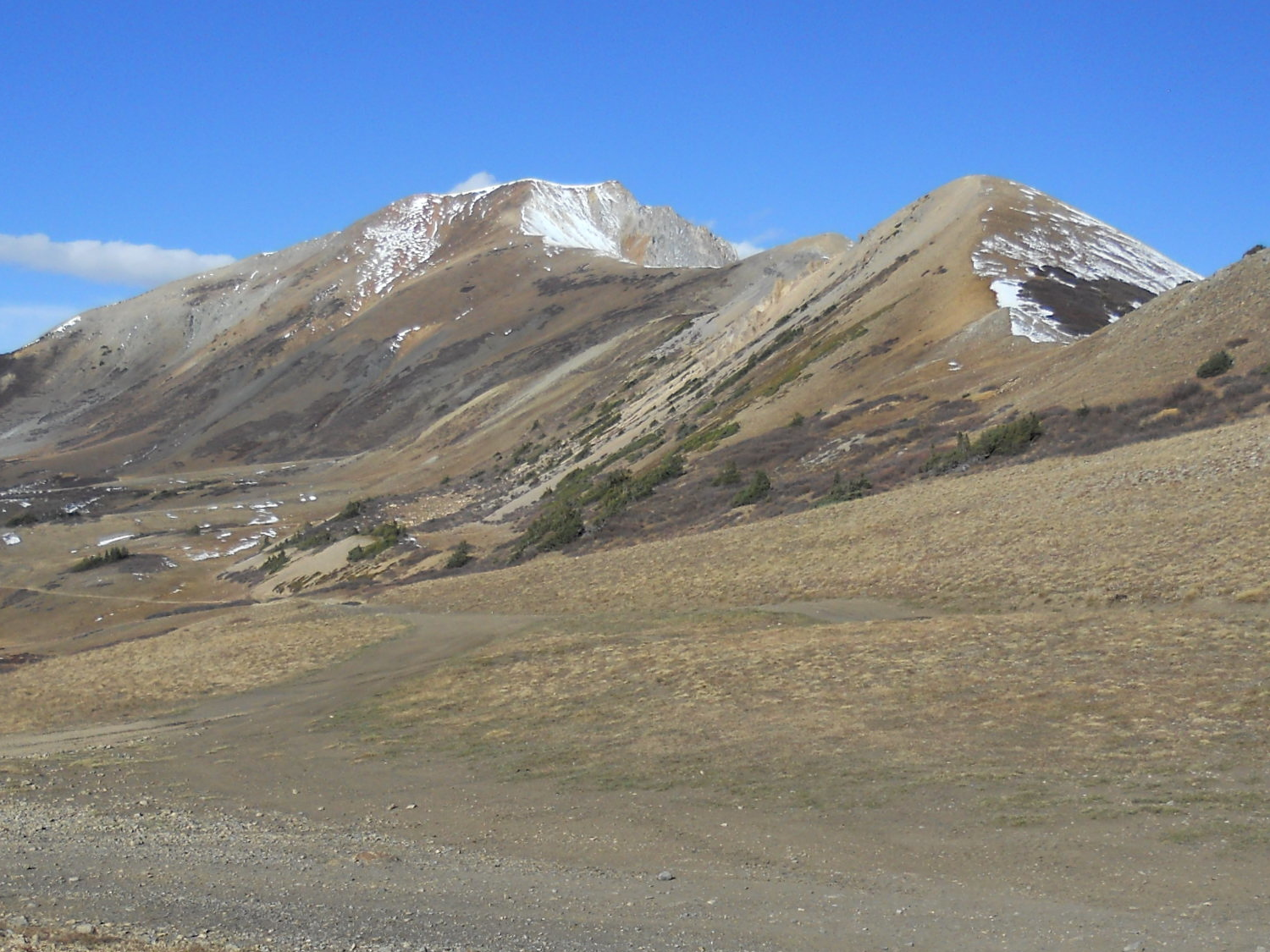
- Italian Mountain viewed from the east.

Highest point
- Elevation: 13,385 ft (4,080 m)
- Prominence: 1,358 ft (414 m)
- Isolation: 3.47 mi (5.58 km)
- Coordinates: 38°56′43″N 106°45′08″W

Geography
- Location within Colorado
- Location: Gunnison County, Colorado, U.S.
- Parent range: Elk Mountains
- Topo map(s): USGS 7.5' topographic map Pearl Pass, Colorado

Italian Mountain is a high mountain summit in the Elk Mountains range of the Rocky Mountains of North America. The 13,385-foot (4,080 m) thirteener is located in Gunnison National Forest, 13.2 miles (21.3 km) east-northeast (bearing 66°) of the Town of Crested Butte in Gunnison County, Colorado, United States. Italian Mountain was so named because the mountain's tones were said to resemble the colors of the Italian tricolor: green, white, and red.

== See also ==
- List of Colorado mountain ranges
- List of Colorado mountain summits
  - List of Colorado fourteeners
  - List of Colorado 4000 meter prominent summits
  - List of the most prominent summits of Colorado
- List of Colorado county high points
