= Mount Sopris =

Twin-Peak Mountain in Colorado, United States

Mount Sopris West Peak
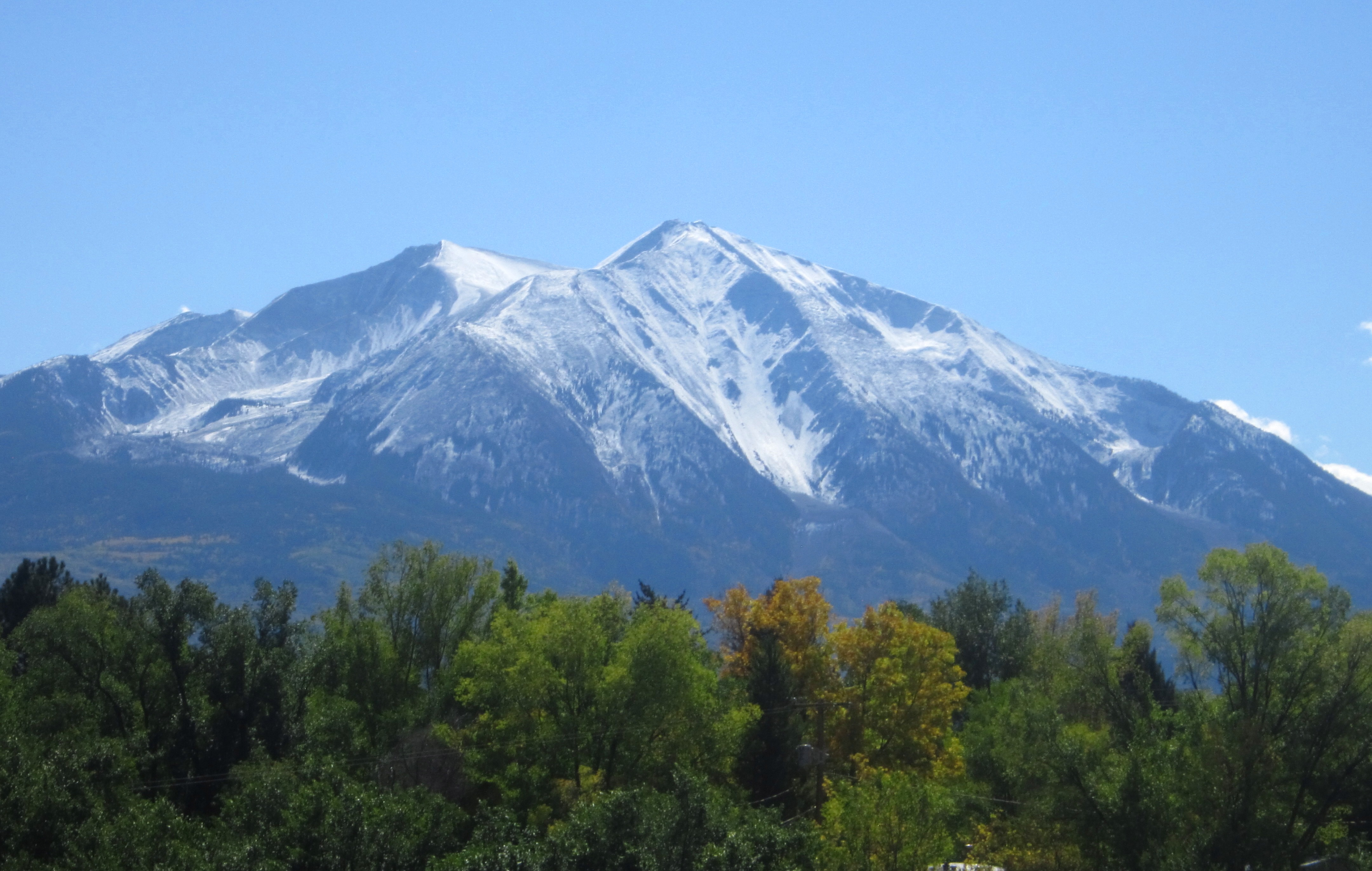
- Mount Sopris as viewed from State Highway 82.

Highest point
- Elevation: 12,965 ft (3,952 m)
- Prominence: 1,453 ft (443 m)
- Isolation: 9.23 mi (14.85 km)
- Coordinates: 39°15′48″N 107°10′33″W

Geography
- Location within Colorado
- Location: Pitkin County, Colorado, U.S.
- Parent range: Elk Mountains
- Topo map(s): USGS 7.5' topographic map Mount Sopris, Colorado

Climbing
- Easiest route: Mount Sopris Trail (hike)

Mount Sopris East Peak

Highest point
- Elevation: 12,965 ft (3,952 m)
- Coordinates: 39°15′40″N 107°09′51″W

Mount Sopris is a twin-summit mountain in the northwestern Elk Mountains range of the Rocky Mountains of North America. The prominent 12,965-foot (3,952 m) mountain is located in the Maroon Bells-Snowmass Wilderness of White River National Forest, 6.6 miles (10.7 km) north by northeast (bearing 30°) of the community of Redstone in Pitkin County, Colorado, United States.

== Mountain ==
Time-lapse of Mount Sopris.

Mount Sopris is located in western Pitkin County, south of Carbondale and southwest of the confluence of the Crystal and Roaring Fork rivers. Mount Sopris is notable for having two summits, East Sopris and West Sopris, that are one-half mile (0.8 km) apart and have the same elevation of 12,965 feet (3,952 m).

It is named for Richard Sopris, a former mayor of Denver and part of the first European expedition in the Roaring Fork Valley. In 2011 J.P. McDaniels petitioned to rename East Sopris "Mount John Denver" after the Colorado singer. A local poll in Aspen and Carbondale said 74 percent of the respondents were against the proposal.

Mount Sopris is believed to have been formed by an igneous intrusion 10,000 feet below the Earth's surface, geologically referred to as a pluton, that occurred around 30 million years ago, after the initial uplift of the modern Rocky Mountains. Mount Sopris is not a volcano, but it is possible that an ancient volcano sat above it, with the current rock forming the magma chamber far below. Due to subsequent continued erosion, any evidence is now gone. In either case, the rock that makes up Sopris never reached the surface, cooling and crystallizing in situ, and later becoming exposed due to erosion. Nearby prominent peaks Mount Gunnison and Crested Butte are believed to have formed similarly.

Mount Sopris dominates the skyline of Carbondale and the lower Roaring Fork Valley, serving as an unofficial symbol of the area. It is prominently visible from State Highway 82 in the vicinity of Carbondale. In terms of local relief, it is one of the largest peaks in the state of Colorado. For example, West Sopris rises 6,400 ft (1,905 m) above the valley to the west in only 2.7 mi (4 km). (One can compare this to the corresponding vertical rise of the more well-known Maroon Peak in the heart of the Elks: it rises only about 4,300 ft (1,310 m), at best, in the same horizontal distance.) In fact a vertical rise of over 6,000 feet in less than 3 miles is rare and impressive anywhere in the contiguous United States.

Looking North West from Mt. Sopris

== Hiking/Climbing ==
The Mount Sopris Trail ascends to East Sopris via its east ridge. It starts near Dinkle Lake, on the northeast side of the mountain, and passes between the two Thomas Lakes just before reaching timberline. The ascent involves about 4,300 ft (1,300 m) of vertical gain (plus 600 ft/180 m for a round-trip to West Sopris, if desired) and 12 mi (20 km) of hiking (plus 1 mi/1.6 km for West Sopris); it is a strenuous trail hike, with some scree.

== Historical names ==
- "Wemagooah Kazuhchich,”(Ute) or “Ancient Mountain Heart Sits There.”
- Mount Sopris
- Sopris Peak
- Mother Mountain

== Glacial Activity ==
Mount Sopris is famed for its extensive rock glaciers that rest in the mountain's cirques. The cirques on Mount Sopris were formed by ancient ice glaciers. As the mountain has eroded, the cirques have been filled with rock glaciers, a slowing moving mass composed of a mixture of rock and ice. These rock glaciers creep down the mountain at a rate of around 10 inches every year and they provide a water source for creeks coming off the mountain.

== See also ==
- List of Colorado mountain ranges
- List of Colorado mountain summits
  - List of Colorado fourteeners
  - List of Colorado 4000 meter prominent summits
  - List of the most prominent summits of Colorado
- List of Colorado county high points
