= Gothic Mountain =

Mountain in Colorado, United States

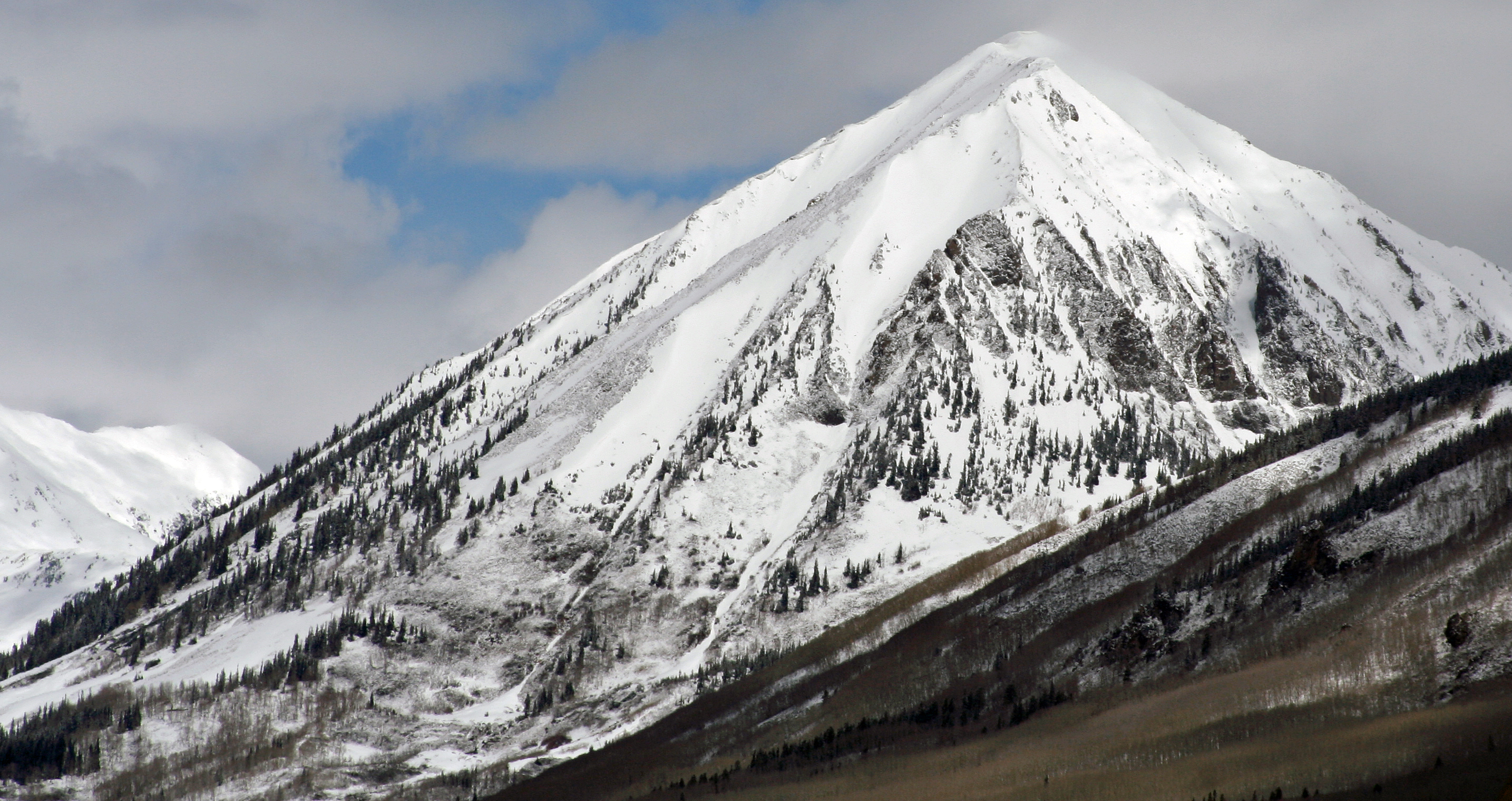
- A view of Gothic Mountain from Crested Butte in 2010

Highest point
- Elevation: 12,631 ft (3,850 m)
- Prominence: 1,645 ft (501 m)
- Isolation: 2.73 mi (4.39 km)
- Listing: Colorado prominent summits
- Coordinates: 38°57′23″N 107°00′38″W

Geography
- Location within Colorado
- Location: Gunnison County, Colorado, U.S.
- Parent range: Elk Mountains
- Topo map(s): USGS 7.5' topographic map Oh-be-joyful, Colorado

Gothic Mountain is a prominent mountain summit in the Elk Mountains range of the Rocky Mountains of North America. The 12,631-foot (3,850 m) peak is located in Gunnison National Forest, 1.1 miles (1.8 km) west by south (bearing 260°) of the ghost town of Gothic in Gunnison County, Colorado, United States. Gothic Mountain takes its name from its pinnacles said to resemble Gothic architecture.

== See also ==
- List of Colorado mountain ranges
- List of Colorado mountain summits
  - List of Colorado fourteeners
  - List of Colorado 4000 meter prominent summits
  - List of the most prominent summits of Colorado
- List of Colorado county high points
