= Cathedral Peak (Pitkin County, Colorado) =

Mountain in the state of Colorado

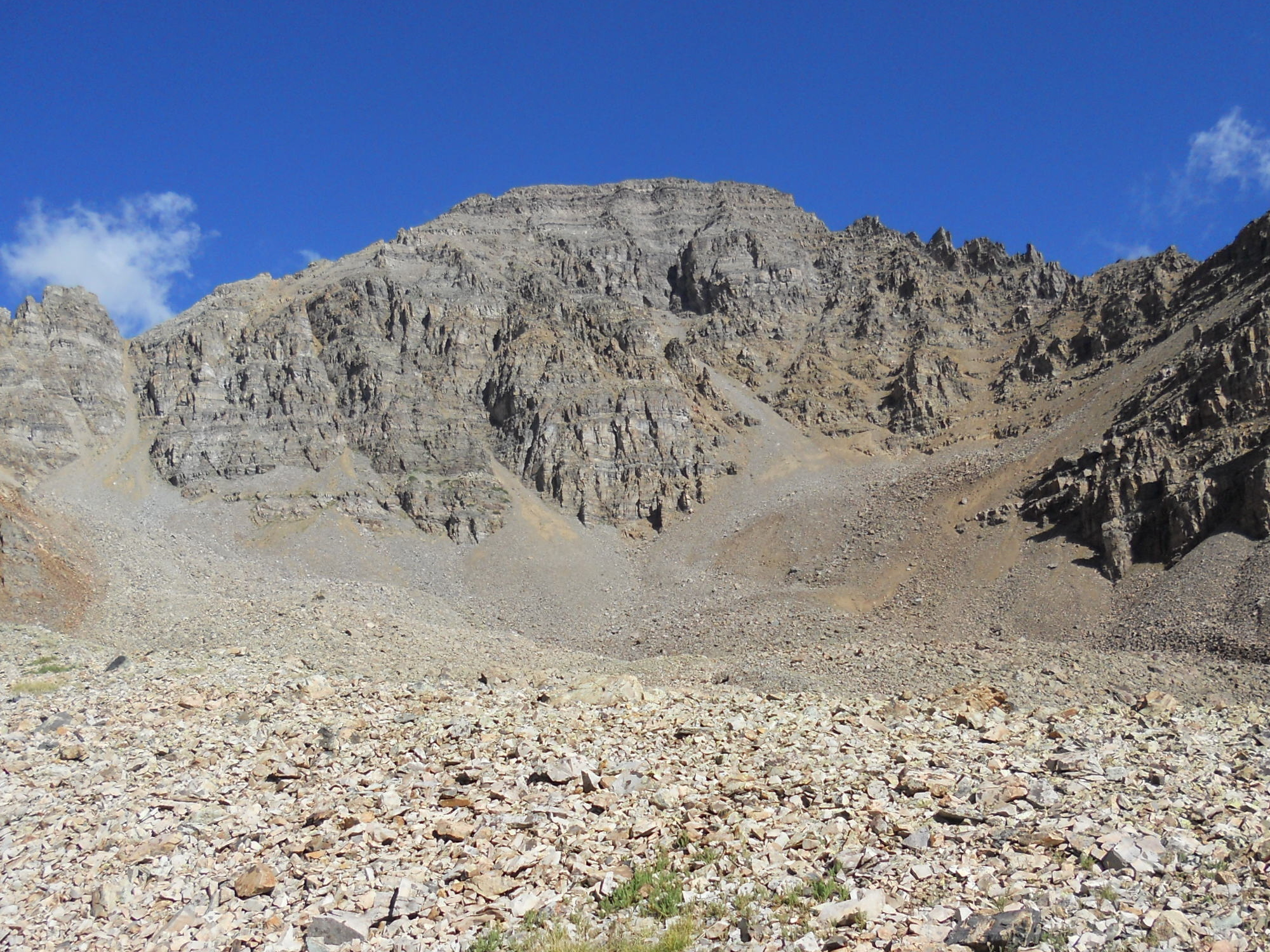
- Cathedral Peak viewed from the southeast.

Highest point
- Elevation: 13,950 ft (4,252 m)
- Prominence: 503 ft (153 m)
- Isolation: 1.30 mi (2.09 km)
- Coordinates: 39°02′04″N 106°51′32″W

Geography
- Location within Colorado
- Location: Pitkin County, Colorado, U.S.
- Parent range: Elk Mountains
- Topo map(s): USGS 7.5' topographic map Hayden Peak, Colorado

Cathedral Peak is a high mountain summit in the Elk Mountains range of the Rocky Mountains of North America. The 13,950-foot (4,252 m) thirteener is located in the Maroon Bells-Snowmass Wilderness of White River National Forest, 11.1 miles (17.9 km) south by west (bearing 186°) of the City of Aspen in Piktin County, Colorado, United States.

== See also ==
- List of Colorado mountain ranges
- List of Colorado mountain summits
  - List of Colorado fourteeners
  - List of Colorado 4000 meter prominent summits
  - List of the most prominent summits of Colorado
- List of Colorado county high points
