= Castle Peak (Colorado) =

Mountain in the state of Colorado, United States

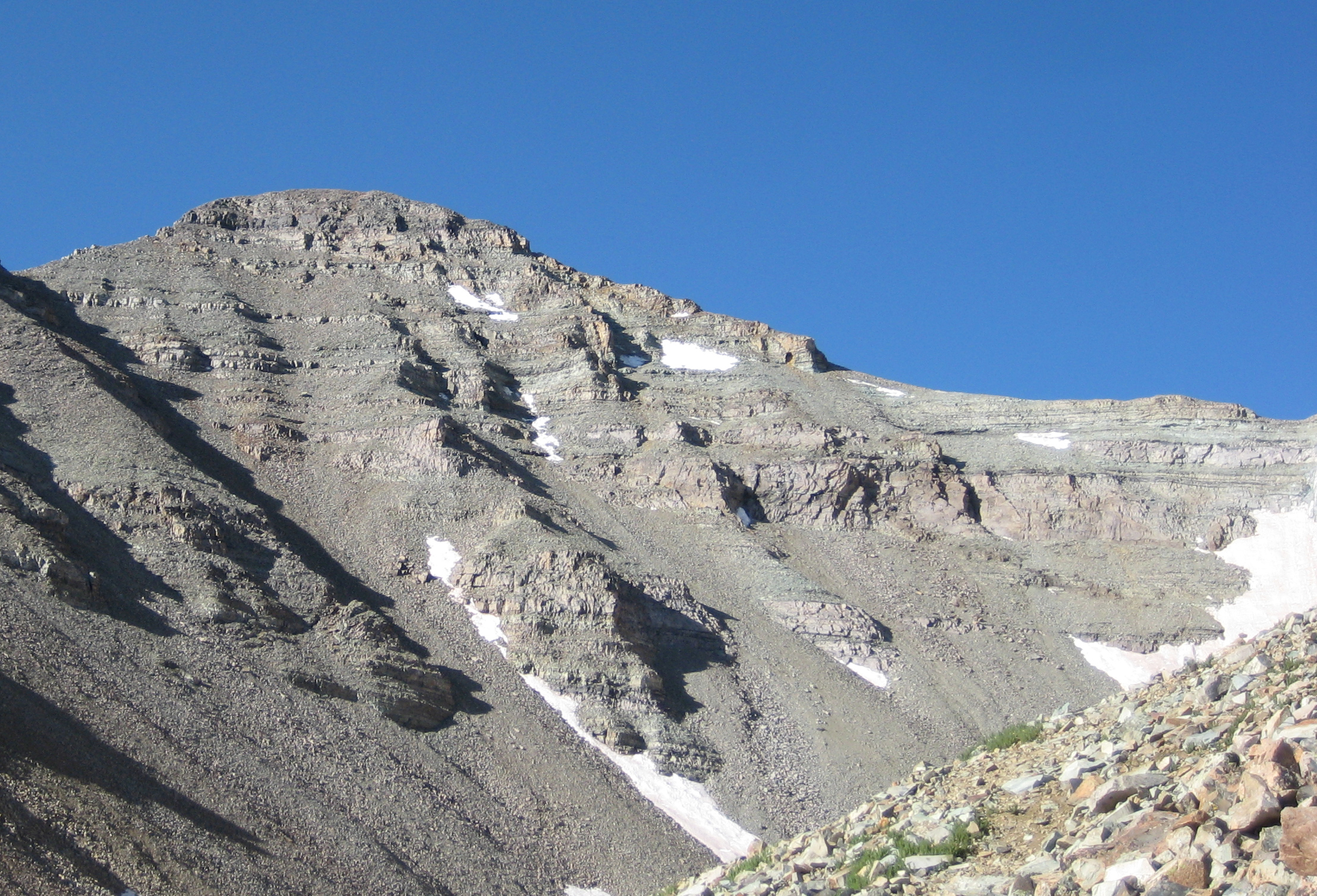
- View from NNE above Montezuma Basin

Highest point
- Elevation: 14,272.3 ft (4,350.2 m); NAPGD2022
- Prominence: 2365 ft (721 m)
- Isolation: 20.9 mi (33.6 km)
- Listing: North America highest peaks 38th; US highest major peaks 24th; Colorado highest major peaks 9th; Colorado fourteeners 9th; Colorado county high points 9th
- Coordinates: 39°00′35″N 106°51′41″W

Geography
- Location within Colorado
- Location: High point of both Gunnison and Pitkin counties, Colorado, U.S.
- Parent range: Highest summit of the Elk Mountains
- Topo map(s): USGS 7.5' topographic map Hayden Peak, Colorado

Climbing
- First ascent: 1873 by the Hayden Survey
- Easiest route: Northeast Ridge: Hike, class 2

Castle Peak is the ninth highest summit of the Rocky Mountains of North America and the U.S. state of Colorado. The prominent 14,272-foot (4350.20 m) fourteener is the highest summit of the Elk Mountains and the Maroon Bells-Snowmass Wilderness. The peak is located 11.6 miles (18.7 km) northeast by north (bearing 32°) of the Town of Crested Butte, Colorado, United States, on the drainage divide separating Gunnison National Forest and Gunnison County from White River National Forest and Pitkin County. The summit of Castle Peak is the highest point of both counties. (Note: The elevation of Castle Peak includes an adjustment of +2.165 m (+7.10 ft) from NGVD 29 to NAVD 88.)

The Aetherius Society considers it to be one of its 19 holy mountains.

== Mountain ==
Castle Peak takes its name from its castellated summit. The best climbing months are June, July, August, September through the Montezuma Glacier, a permanent snowfield between Castle and Conundrum Peaks. There are two standard routes for ascent. The Northwest Ridge features a moderate snow climb followed by an easy ridge scramble. It should not be attempted late in the summer when the 200 feet (60 m) of loose dirt and scree meet the climber near the top of the Castle-Conundrum saddle. The Northeast Ridge features an easy snow climb, but slightly harder scrambling and route-finding once on the ridge. Both routes are rated as Class 2.

There are two other peaks in Colorado that have the same name: one in Eagle County at 39°46′23″N 106°50′04″W, with an elevation 11,280+ feet, (3438+ m); and the other in Mesa County at 39°16′16″N 108°05′40″W, with an elevation of 8,140 feet (2,481 m).

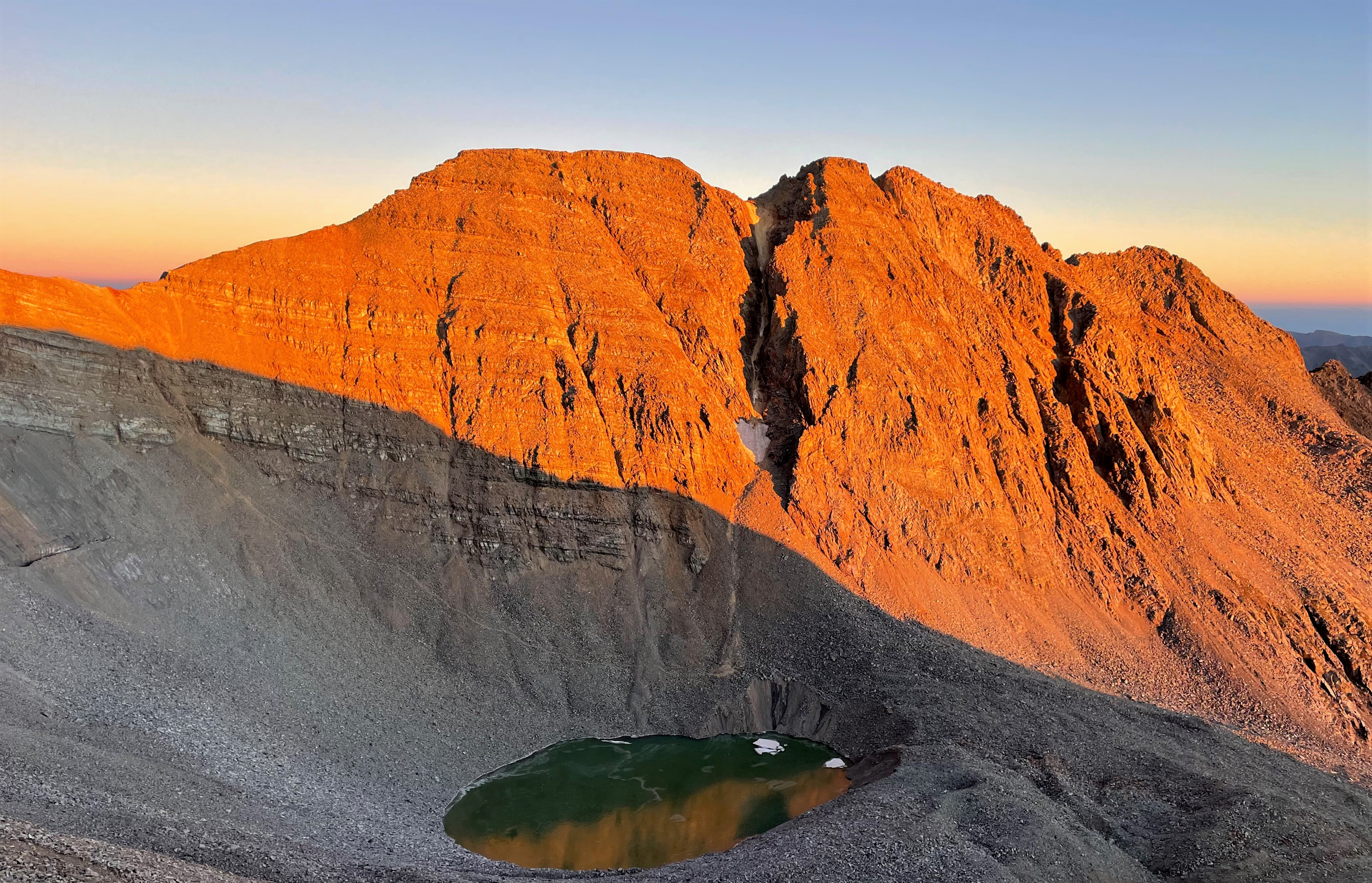
Conundrum Peak

Conundrum Peak is a northern subsummit of Castle Peak. It has two closely spaced summits; the northern is higher, with elevation of 14,040+ feet (4279+ m). It is 0.4 miles (0.6 km) north of Castle Peak, and has 200 feet (61 m) of clean topographic prominence. This does not meet the usual 300-foot (91 m) prominence criterion for an officially separate peak; however, it is often climbed in conjunction with Castle Peak.

== Climate ==
Climate data for Castle Peak 39.0084 N, 106.8615 W, Elevation: 13,491 ft (4,112 m) (1991–2020 normals)
Month	Jan	Feb	Mar	Apr	May	Jun	Jul	Aug	Sep	Oct	Nov	Dec	Year
Mean daily maximum °F (°C)	21.9 (−5.6)	21.3 (−5.9)	26.4 (−3.1)	31.6 (−0.2)	40.5 (4.7)	52.5 (11.4)	57.4 (14.1)	56.3 (13.5)	49.8 (9.9)	39.2 (4.0)	28.3 (−2.1)	22.0 (−5.6)	37.3 (2.9)
Daily mean °F (°C)	10.4 (−12.0)	9.4 (−12.6)	14.0 (−10.0)	18.9 (−7.3)	27.9 (−2.3)	38.7 (3.7)	44.1 (6.7)	43.1 (6.2)	36.6 (2.6)	26.7 (−2.9)	17.2 (−8.2)	10.8 (−11.8)	24.8 (−4.0)
Mean daily minimum °F (°C)	−1.2 (−18.4)	−2.5 (−19.2)	1.6 (−16.9)	6.2 (−14.3)	15.3 (−9.3)	24.9 (−3.9)	30.7 (−0.7)	29.9 (−1.2)	23.4 (−4.8)	14.2 (−9.9)	6.2 (−14.3)	−0.4 (−18.0)	12.4 (−10.9)
Average precipitation inches (mm)	5.09 (129)	5.30 (135)	5.08 (129)	5.73 (146)	3.62 (92)	1.53 (39)	2.50 (64)	2.72 (69)	2.95 (75)	3.87 (98)	4.95 (126)	4.74 (120)	48.08 (1,222)
Source: PRISM Climate Group

== See also ==
- List of mountain peaks of North America
  - List of mountain peaks of the United States
    - List of mountain peaks of Colorado
      - List of Colorado county high points
      - List of Colorado fourteeners
