= Chair Mountain =

Mountain in Colorado, United States

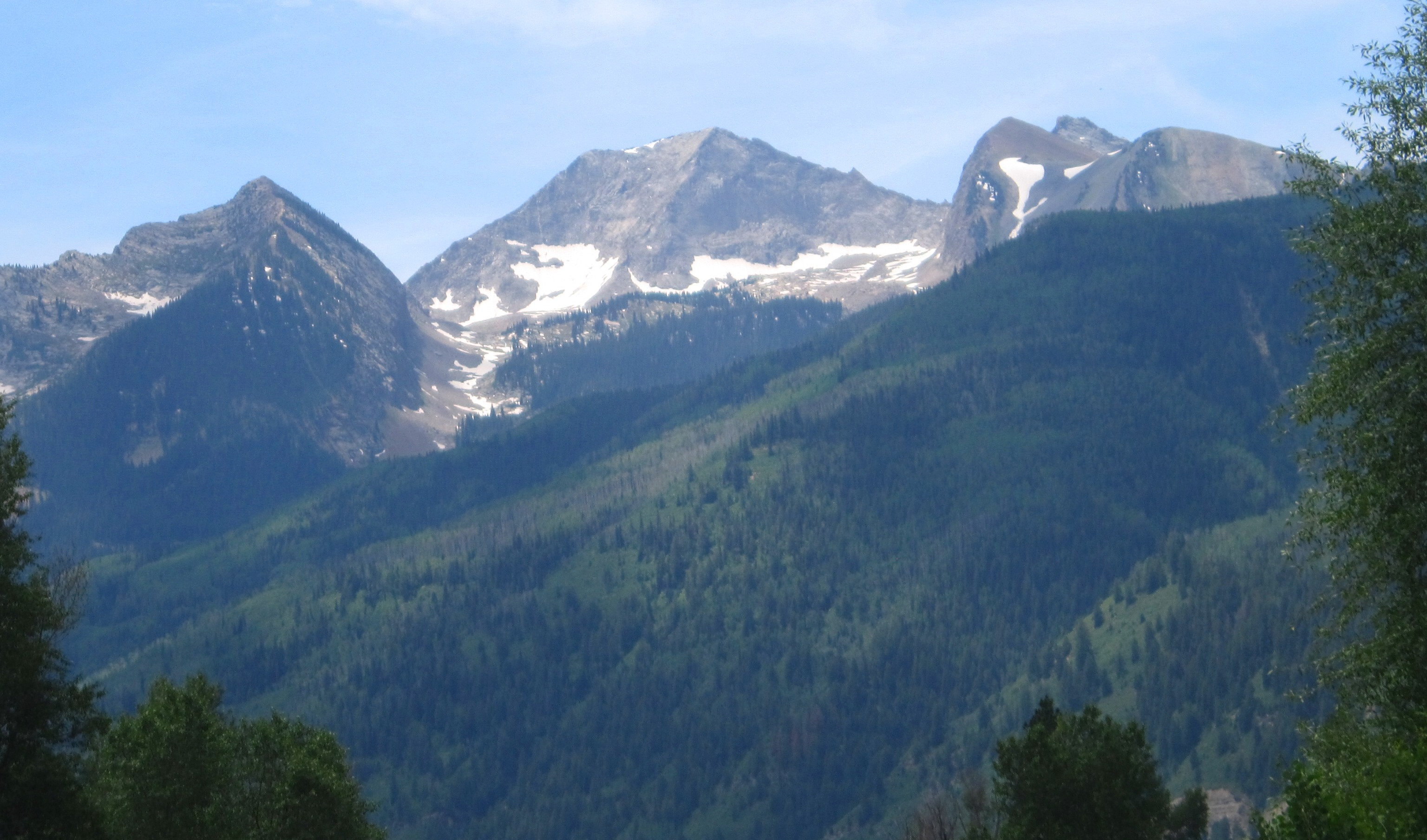
- Chair Mountain

Highest point
- Elevation: 12,727 ft (3,879 m)
- Prominence: 2,461 ft (750 m)
- Isolation: 8.89 mi (14.31 km)
- Listing: Colorado prominent summits
- Coordinates: 39°03′29″N 107°16′56″W

Geography
- Location within Colorado
- Location: Gunnison County, Colorado, U.S.
- Parent range: Elk Mountains
- Topo map(s): USGS 7.5' topographic map Chair Mountain, Colorado

Chair Mountain is a prominent mountain summit in the Elk Mountains range of the Rocky Mountains of North America. The 12,727-foot (3,879 m) peak is located in the Raggeds Wilderness of Gunnison National Forest, 5.0 miles (8.1 km) west by south (bearing 259°) of the Town of Marble in Gunnison County, Colorado, United States.

== See also ==
- List of Colorado mountain ranges
- List of Colorado mountain summits
  - List of Colorado fourteeners
  - List of Colorado 4000 meter prominent summits
  - List of the most prominent summits of Colorado
- List of Colorado county high points
