= Elk Mountains (Colorado) =

Mountain range in Colorado, US

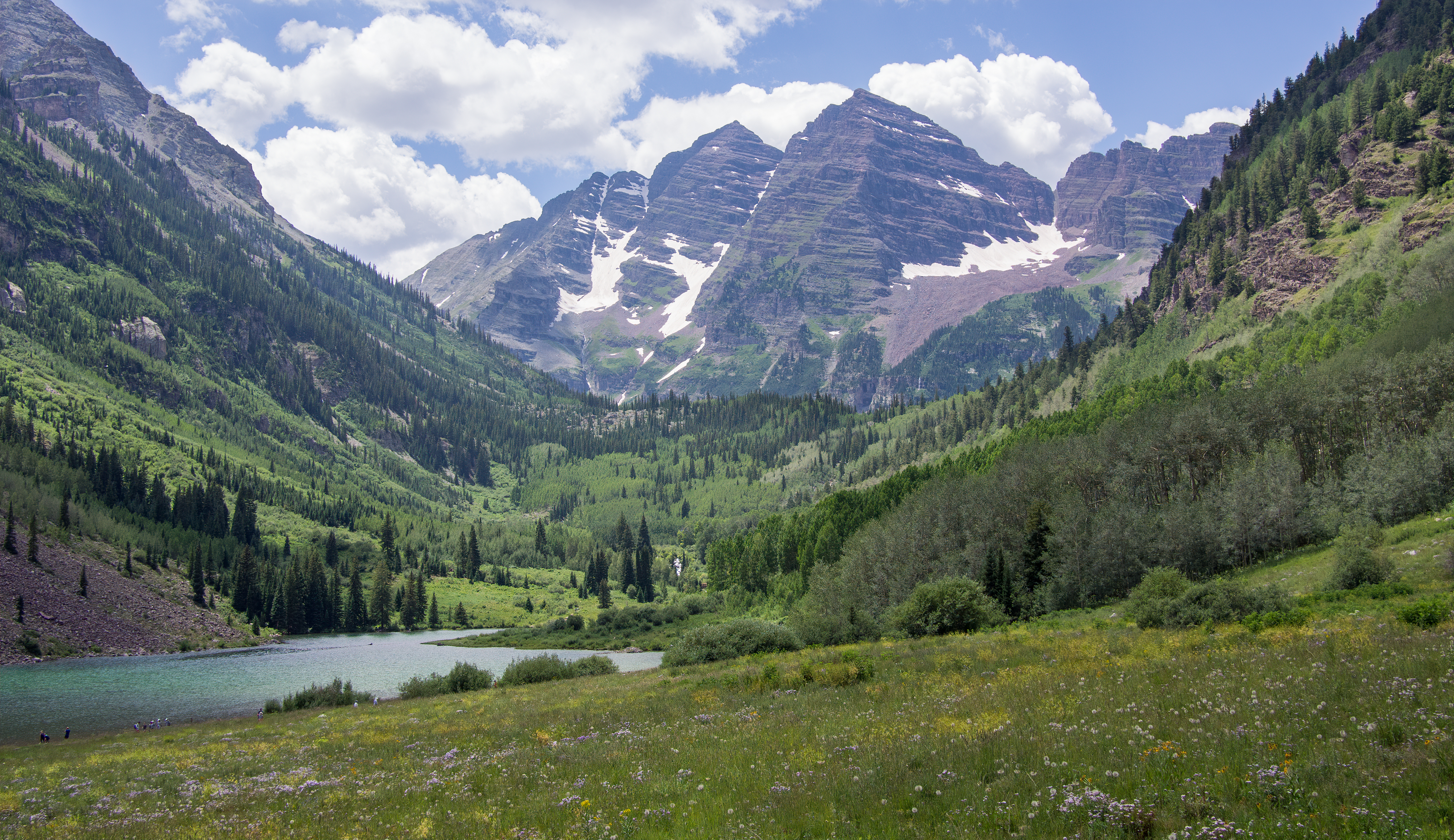
- The Maroon Bells, Elk Mountains.

Highest point
- Peak: Castle Peak
- Elevation: 14,265 ft (4,348 m)
- Listing: Mountain ranges of Colorado
- Coordinates: 39°00′35″N 106°51′14″W

Geography
- Location within Colorado
- Country: United States
- State: Colorado
- County: Pitkin; Gunnison; Eagle
- Parent range: Rocky Mountains
- Borders on: Sawatch Range; West Elk Mountains

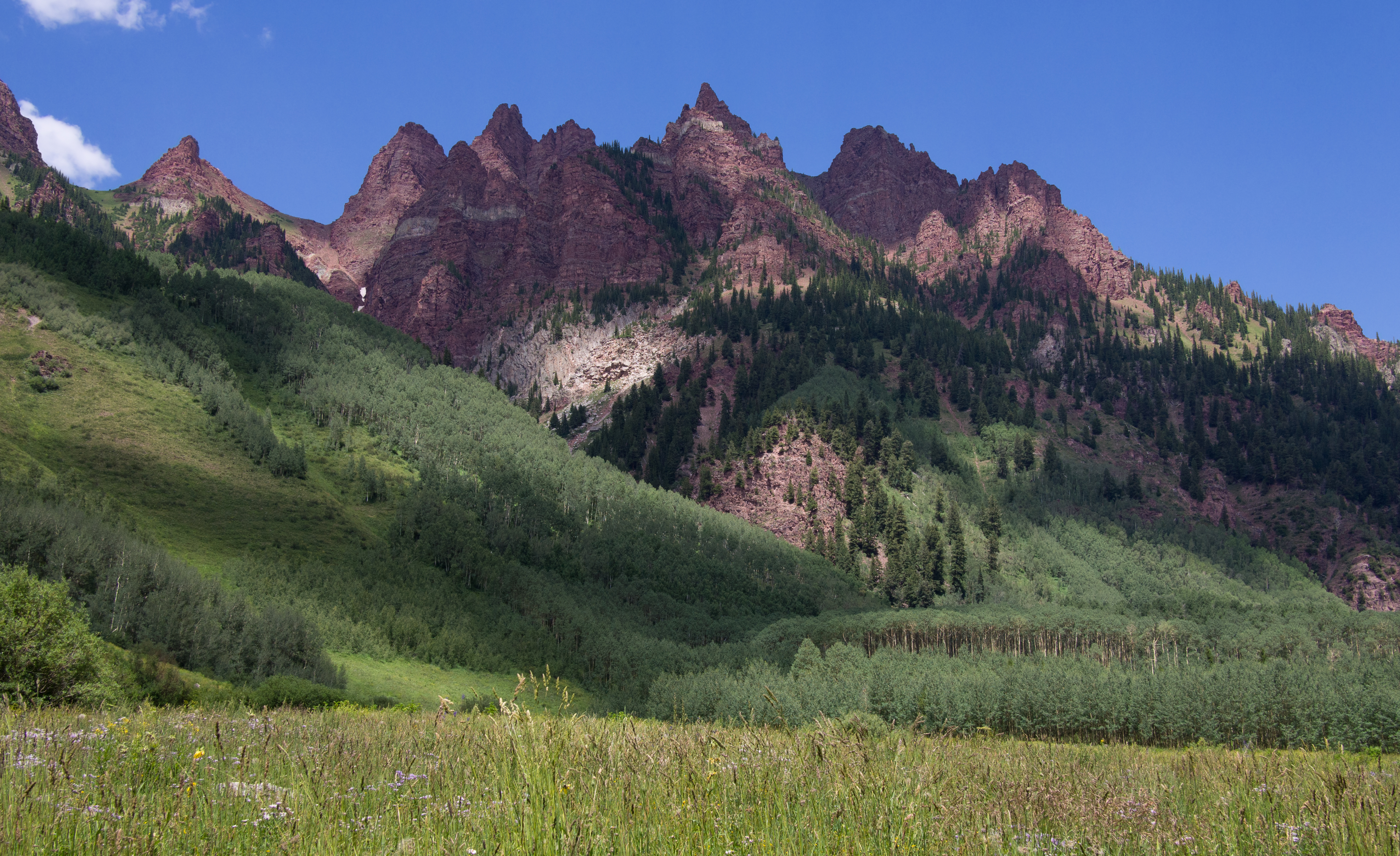
Sievers Mountain, near Maroon Bells

The Elk Mountains are a high, rugged mountain range in the Rocky Mountains of west-central Colorado in the United States. The mountains sit on the western side of the Continental Divide, largely in southern Pitkin and northern Gunnison counties, in the area southwest of Aspen, south of the Roaring Fork River valley, and east of the Crystal River. The range sits west of the Sawatch Range and northeast of the West Elk Mountains. Much of the range is located within the White River National Forest and the Gunnison National Forest, as well as the Maroon Bells-Snowmass Wilderness and Raggeds Wilderness. The Elk Mountains rise nearly 9,000 ft. above the Roaring Fork Valley to the north.

The highest peaks in the range are its fourteeners, Castle Peak (14,265 ft), Maroon Peak (14,156 ft), Capitol Peak (14,130 ft), Snowmass Mountain (14,092 ft), Pyramid Peak (14,018 ft), and North Maroon Peak (14,014 ft). Maroon Peak and North Maroon Peak are collectively known as the Maroon Bells, a popular destination for recreation alpinism. Mount Sopris (12,953 ft) sits at the northwest end of the range and dominates the skyline of the lower Roaring Fork Valley and the town of Carbondale, Colorado, serving as an unofficial symbol of the area.

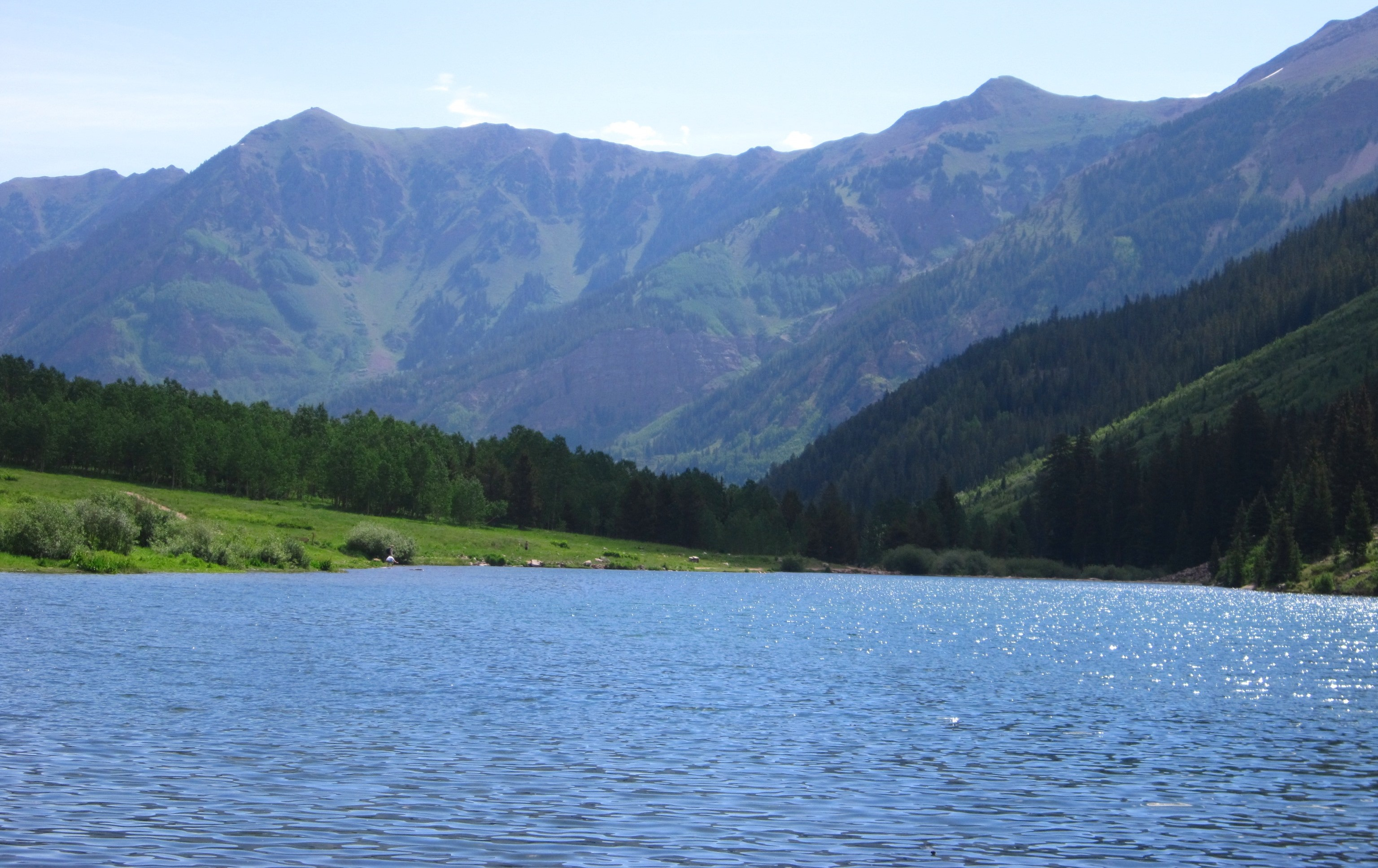
Maroon Lake, Bear Mountains.

Notable peaks in the range include:

- Cathedral Peak, 13,950 ft (4,252 m), near Pyramid Peak
- Hagerman Peak, 13,841 ft (4,219 m), near Snowmass Mountain
- Snowmass Peak, 13,620 ft (4,151 m), near Hagerman Peak
- Clark Peak, 13,580 ft (4,139 m), near Capitol Peak
- Treasure Mountain, 13,528 ft (4,123 m), southwest of the Maroon Bells
- Mount Owen, 13,058 ft (3,980 m), high point of the Ruby Range
- Mount Sopris, 12,965 ft (3,952 m), north west of Capitol Peak
- Chair Mountain, 12,721 ft (3,877 m), high point of The Raggeds
- Crested Butte, 12,162 ft (3,706 m), home of Crested Butte Mountain Resort
- Whitehouse Mountain, 11,975 ft (3,650 m), northwest of Treasure Mountain

The range provides a formidable barrier to travel and is traversed only by backroad passes and trails, including Schofield Pass, Pearl Pass, and Taylor Pass. State Highway 133 traverses McClure Pass, at the western end of the range. The range has been the site of mining activity since the days of the Colorado Silver Boom, which saw the founding of mining towns such as Aspen and Ashcroft. In the late 19th century, the western and southern flank of the range became the site of intense coal mining activity which continues to the present day. Treasure Mountain, overlooking the town of Marble, is home to the famous Yule Marble Quarry. Quarried marble was used to create The Tomb of the Unknowns, the Lincoln Memorial, Denver Post Office and other buildings. The range receives a great deal of snowfall due to its position to the west of the continental divide and the westerly origin of many winter storms. This is exploited by the ski areas in the vicinity of Aspen, which are located on the flanks of smaller mountains alongside the Roaring Fork Valley.

== Prominent peaks ==
The 10 Peaks of the Elk Mountains With At Least 500 Meters of Topographic Prominence
Rank	Mountain Peak	Elevation	Prominence	Isolation
1	Castle Peak NGS	14,279 feet 4352 m	2,365 feet 721 m	20.9 miles 33.7 km
2	Maroon Peak NGS	14,163 feet 4317 m	2,336 feet 712 m	8.1 miles 13.0 km
3	Capitol Peak	14,137 feet 4309 m	1,730 feet 527 m	7.4 miles 12.0 km
4	Pyramid PeakNGS	14,025 feet 4275 m	1,649 feet 503 m	2.1 miles 3.4 km
5	Treasure Mountain PB	13,535 feet 4125 m	2,821 feet 860 m	6.9 miles 11.1 km
6	Chair Mountain NGS PB	12,727 feet 3879 m	2,461 feet 750 m	8.9 miles 14.3 km
7	Gothic Mountain PB	12,631 feet 3850 m	1,645 feet 501 m	3.2 miles 5.2 km
8	Matchless Mountain PB	12,389 feet 3776 m	1,763 feet 537 m	9.6 miles 15.5 km
9	Crested Butte PB	12,168 feet 3709 m	2,582 feet 787 m	4.7 miles 7.5 km
10	Huntsman Mountain Northwest PB	11,858 feet 3614 m	3,072 feet 936 m	10.3 miles 16.6 km

== See also ==
- West Elk Mountains
