= Crested Butte =

Mountain in the state of Colorado

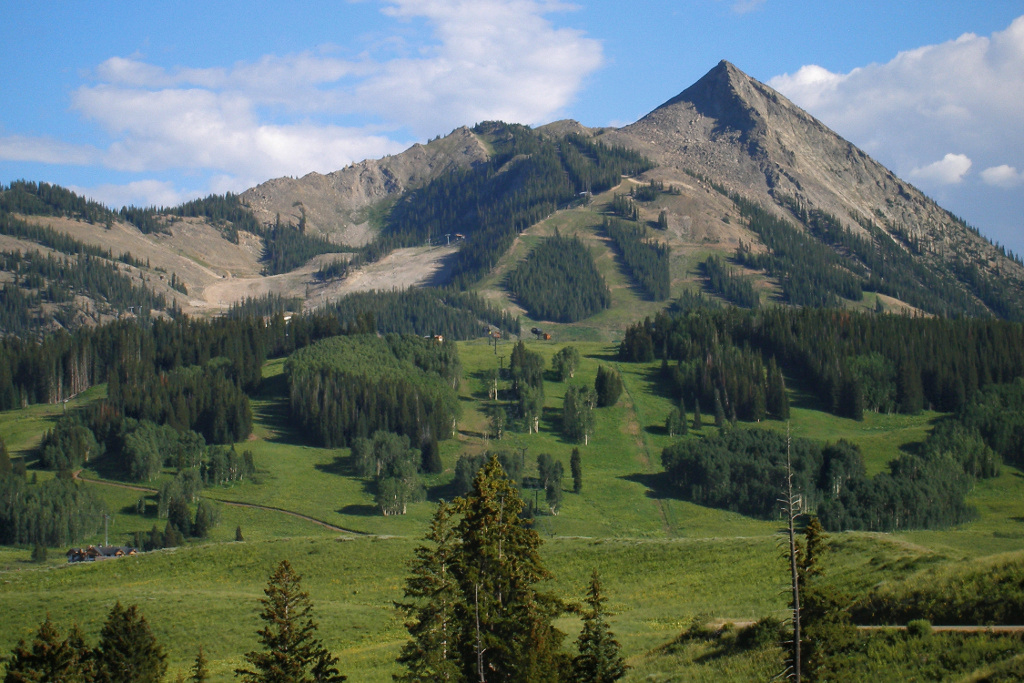
- Crested Butte from the north

Highest point
- Elevation: 12,168 ft (3,709 m)
- Prominence: 2,582 ft (787 m)
- Isolation: 4.65 mi (7.48 km)
- Listing: Colorado prominent summits
- Coordinates: 38°53′00″N 106°56′37″W

Geography
- Location within Colorado
- Location: Gunnison County, Colorado, U.S.
- Parent range: Elk Mountains
- Topo map(s): USGS 7.5' topographic map Gothic, Colorado

Climbing
- Easiest route: hike

Crested Butte is a prominent mountain summit in the Elk Mountains range of the Rocky Mountains of North America. The 12,168-foot (3,709 m) peak is in Gunnison National Forest, 2.1 miles (3.4 km) northeast by east (bearing 59°) of the Town of Crested Butte in Gunnison County, Colorado, United States. Ski lifts and runs of the Crested Butte Mountain Resort occupy the north side of the mountain.

== Climate ==
The Köppen Climate Classification subtype for Crested Butte is "Dfc" which is continental subarctic. This climate type is dominated by the winter season with a long, bitterly cold period of minimal daylight hours, heavy snowfall and low humidity. The annual snowfall average is 198.4 inches (504 cm) with January recording the highest average snowfall at 40 inches (100 cm). July is the warmest month with an average temperature of 57.2 °F (14.0 °C) while January is the coldest month with an average temperature of 11.8 °F (−11.2 °C). The average temperature for the year is 34.7 °F (1.5 °C).

Climate data for Crested Butte (Mountain) 38.8860 N, 106.9445 W, Elevation: 11,696 ft (3,565 m) (1991–2020 normals)
Month	Jan	Feb	Mar	Apr	May	Jun	Jul	Aug	Sep	Oct	Nov	Dec	Year
Mean daily maximum °F (°C)	27.0 (−2.8)	27.1 (−2.7)	33.3 (0.7)	39.2 (4.0)	48.1 (8.9)	60.2 (15.7)	65.1 (18.4)	63.4 (17.4)	56.7 (13.7)	45.3 (7.4)	33.8 (1.0)	27.0 (−2.8)	43.9 (6.6)
Daily mean °F (°C)	16.0 (−8.9)	15.8 (−9.0)	21.2 (−6.0)	26.5 (−3.1)	35.5 (1.9)	46.5 (8.1)	52.0 (11.1)	50.5 (10.3)	43.9 (6.6)	33.3 (0.7)	23.2 (−4.9)	16.3 (−8.7)	31.7 (−0.2)
Mean daily minimum °F (°C)	5.0 (−15.0)	4.4 (−15.3)	9.0 (−12.8)	13.8 (−10.1)	22.8 (−5.1)	32.8 (0.4)	38.8 (3.8)	37.6 (3.1)	31.1 (−0.5)	21.3 (−5.9)	12.5 (−10.8)	5.7 (−14.6)	19.6 (−6.9)
Average precipitation inches (mm)	3.09 (78)	3.06 (78)	2.71 (69)	2.58 (66)	2.04 (52)	0.89 (23)	1.93 (49)	1.94 (49)	2.01 (51)	2.04 (52)	2.63 (67)	3.01 (76)	27.93 (710)
Average snowfall inches (cm)	61.10 (155.2)	62.60 (159.0)	49.30 (125.2)	46.70 (118.6)	31.10 (79.0)	2.50 (6.4)	0.00 (0.00)	0.00 (0.00)	3.20 (8.1)	25.70 (65.3)	41.10 (104.4)	65.70 (166.9)	389 (988.1)
Source 1: PRISM Climate Group
Source 2: NOAA (snowfall)

== Geology ==
Crested Butte is a laccolith rather than a true butte, formed when magma intruded into Mancos Shale approximately 30 million years ago. Subsequently the softer, overlying sedimentary rock has eroded away, exposing the more resistant igneous rock. The bulk of Crested Butte is composed of quartz monzonite porphyry and granodiorite porphyry. The lower slopes consist of Mancos Shale overlain with debris from the granitic slopes above. The Mancos Shale at the base of Crested Butte can be an unstable substrate for building and result in geologic hazards such as landslides and earthflows.

Crested Butte is one of over a dozen laccoliths in the Elk and adjacent West Elk Mountains. The magma intrusions associated with these laccoliths resulted in contact metamorphism of the surrounding sedimentary rock and mineralization. The metamorphism also altered the bituminous coal present in the sedimentary rock into a higher quality coal, including anthracite, which was mined extensively in the Crested Butte area during the late 19th and early 20th centuries.

== Photo Gallery ==
Crested Butte viewed from Meridian Lake

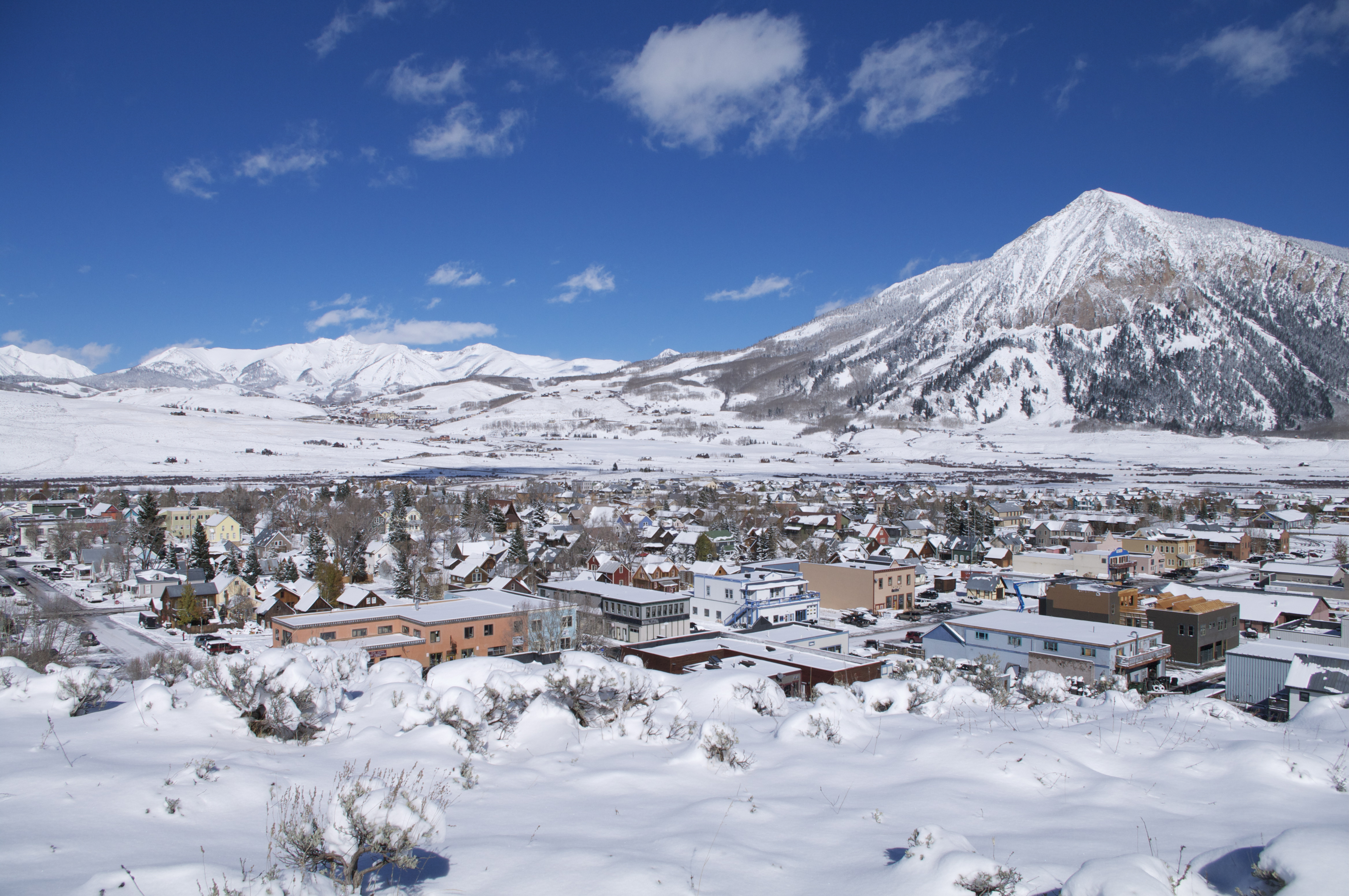
Crested Butte and the town of Crested Butte

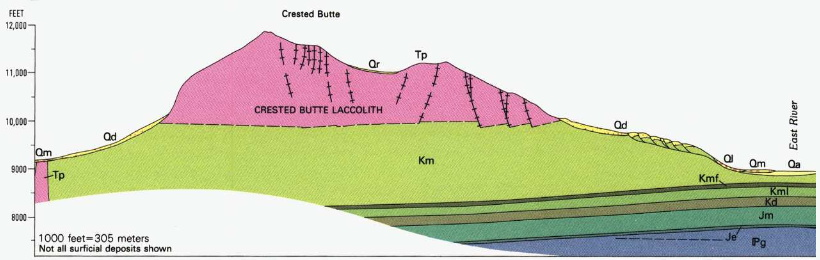
Geologic cross section of Crested Butte

== See also ==
- List of Colorado mountain ranges
- List of Colorado mountain summits
  - List of the most prominent summits of Colorado
- List of Colorado county high points
