= Horse Mountain =

Mountain in Colorado, United States

- Location within Colorado

Highest point
- Elevation: 9,952 ft (3,033 m)
- Prominence: 1,887 ft (575 m)
- Isolation: 13.06 mi (21.02 km)
- Listing: Colorado prominent summits
- Coordinates: 37°18′30″N 107°17′12″W

Geography
- Location: Archuleta County, Colorado, U.S.
- Parent range: San Juan Mountains
- Topo map(s): USGS 7.5' topographic map Devil Mountain, Colorado

Climbing
- Easiest route: hike

Horse Mountain is a prominent mountain summit in the San Juan Mountains range of the Rocky Mountains of North America. The 9,952-foot (3,033 m) peak is located in San Juan National Forest, 15.8 miles (25.5 km) west by north (bearing 282°) of the Town of Pagosa Springs in Archuleta County, Colorado, United States.

== See also ==
- List of Colorado mountain ranges
- List of Colorado mountain summits
  - List of Colorado fourteeners
  - List of Colorado 4000 meter prominent summits
  - List of the most prominent summits of Colorado
- List of Colorado county high points
