= Black Mountain (Park County, Colorado) =

Mountain in Colorado, United States

- Location within Colorado

Highest point
- Elevation: 11,649 ft (3,551 m)
- Prominence: 2,234 ft (681 m)
- Isolation: 8.03 mi (12.92 km)
- Listing: Colorado prominent summits
- Coordinates: 38°43′07″N 105°41′15″W

Geography
- Location: Park County, Colorado, U.S.
- Parent range: Front Range, South Park Hills
- Topo map(s): USGS 7.5' topographic map Black Mountain, Colorado

Black Mountain is a prominent mountain summit in the South Park Hills of the Rocky Mountains of North America. The 11,649-foot (3,551 m) peak is located in Pike National Forest, 21.7 miles (34.9 km) south by east (bearing 164°) of the community of Hartsel in Park County, Colorado, United States.

== Historical names ==
- Basaltic Mountain
- Black Mountain

== See also ==
- List of Colorado mountain ranges
- List of Colorado mountain summits
  - List of Colorado fourteeners
  - List of Colorado 4000 meter prominent summits
  - List of the most prominent summits of Colorado
- List of Colorado county high points
