= Green Mountain (Kenosha Mountains) =

Mountain in Colorado, United States

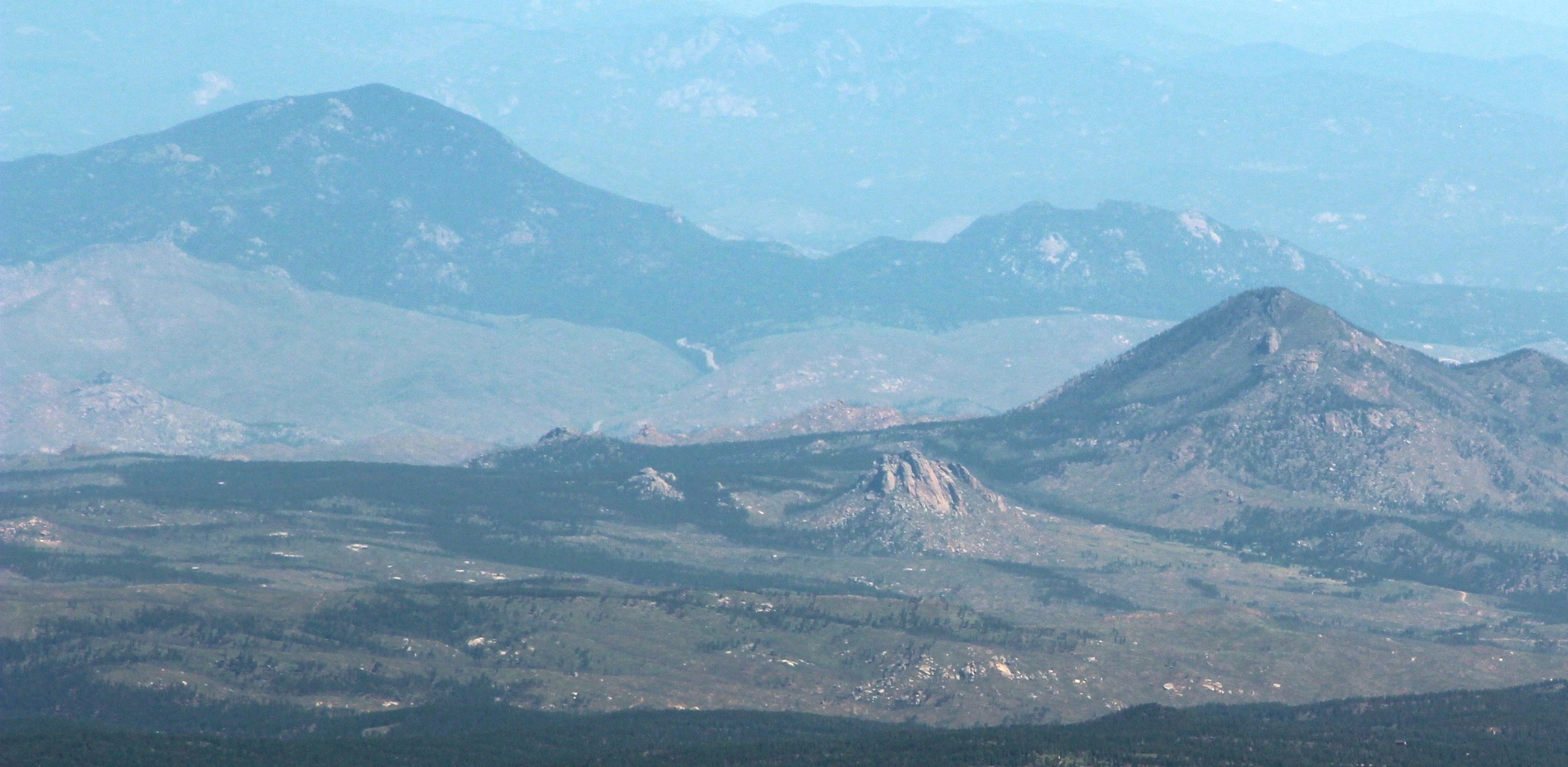
- Green Mountain (left) and Thunder Butte viewed from Pikes Peak

Highest point
- Elevation: 10,427 ft (3,178 m)
- Prominence: 1,859 ft (567 m)
- Isolation: 4.18 mi (6.73 km)
- Listing: Colorado prominent summits
- Coordinates: 39°18′19″N 105°18′01″W

Geography
- Location within Colorado
- Location: Jefferson County, Colorado, U.S.
- Parent range: Front Range, Kenosha Mountains
- Topo map(s): USGS 7.5' topographic map Green Mountain, Colorado

Climbing
- Easiest route: hike

Green Mountain is a prominent mountain summit in the Kenosha Mountains range of the Rocky Mountains of North America. The 10,427-foot (3,178 m) peak is located in Pike National Forest, 5.2 miles (8.4 km) northwest (bearing 311°) of the community of Deckers, Colorado, United States, in Jefferson County.

== See also ==
- List of Colorado mountain ranges
- List of Colorado mountain summits
  - List of Colorado fourteeners
  - List of Colorado 4000 meter prominent summits
  - List of the most prominent summits of Colorado
- List of Colorado county high points
