= Iron Mountain (Sangre de Cristo Range) =

Mountain in Colorado, United States

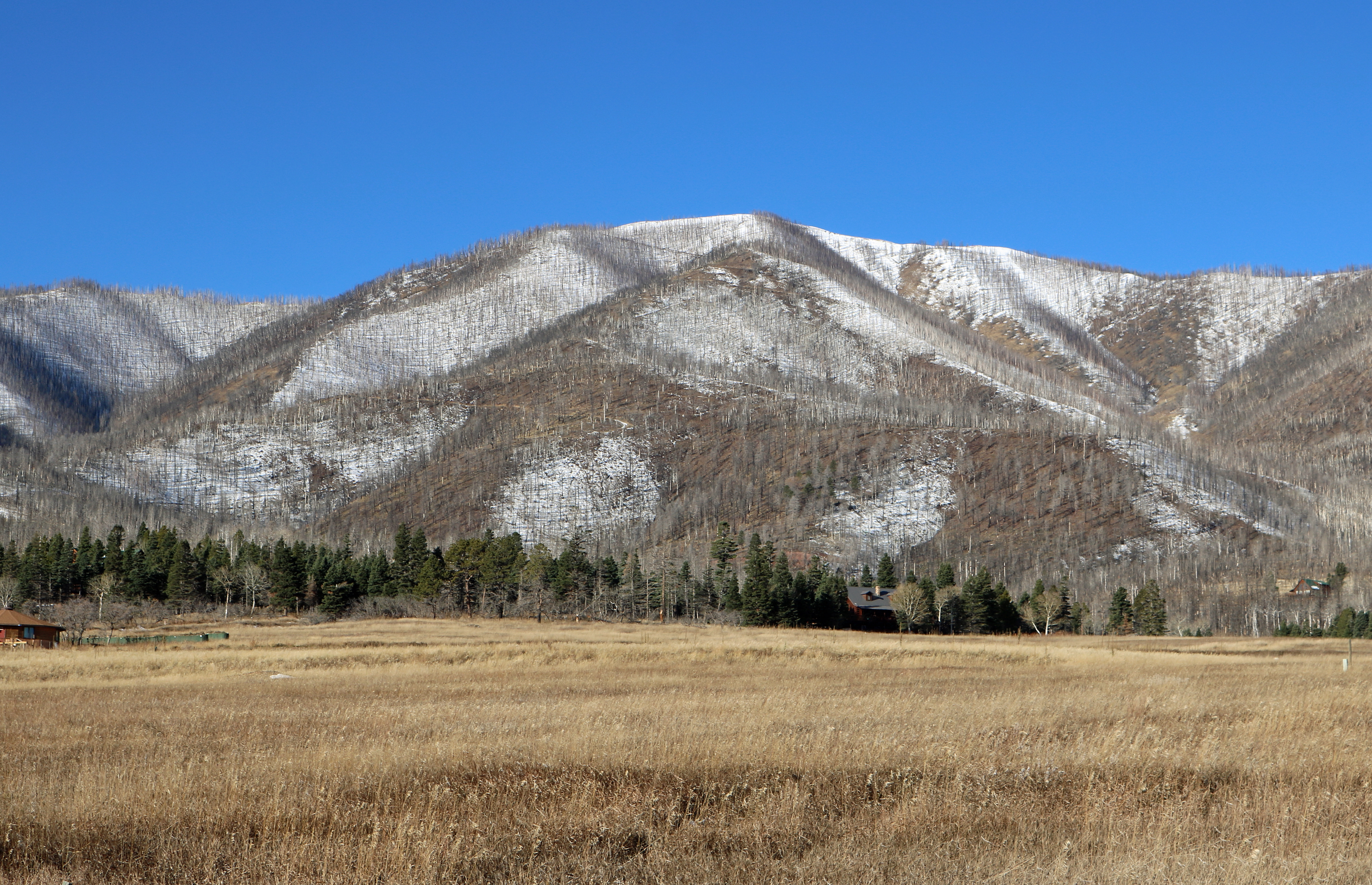
- The mountain in 2022

Highest point
- Elevation: 11,416 ft (3,480 m)
- Prominence: 1,951 ft (595 m)
- Isolation: 6.95 mi (11.18 km)
- Listing: Colorado prominent summits
- Coordinates: 37°38′15″N 105°15′14″W

Geography
- Location within Colorado
- Location: Costilla and Huerfano counties, Colorado, United States
- Parent range: Sangre de Cristo Range
- Topo map(s): USGS 7.5' topographic map Red Wing, Colorado

Iron Mountain is a prominent mountain summit in the southern Sangre de Cristo Range of the Rocky Mountains of North America. The 11,416-foot (3,480 m) peak is located 3.9 miles (6.2 km) west-northwest (bearing 296°) of the North La Veta Pass, Colorado, United States, on the drainage divide between Costilla and Huerfano counties.

== See also ==
- List of Colorado mountain ranges
- List of Colorado mountain summits
  - List of Colorado fourteeners
  - List of Colorado 4000 meter prominent summits
  - List of the most prominent summits of Colorado
- List of Colorado county high points
