= Grannys Nipple =

Mountain in Colorado, United States

Coordinates: 40.275586°N 106.458283°W

Grannys Nipple is a summit in Grand County, Colorado, in the United States. With an elevation of 8,238 feet (2,511 m), Grannys Nipple is the 3257th tallest mountain in Colorado.

== See also ==
- List of Colorado mountain ranges
- List of Colorado mountain summits
  - List of Colorado fourteeners
  - List of Colorado 4000 meter prominent summits
  - List of the most prominent summits of Colorado
- List of Colorado county high points
