= Mount Zwischen =

Mountain in the state of Colorado

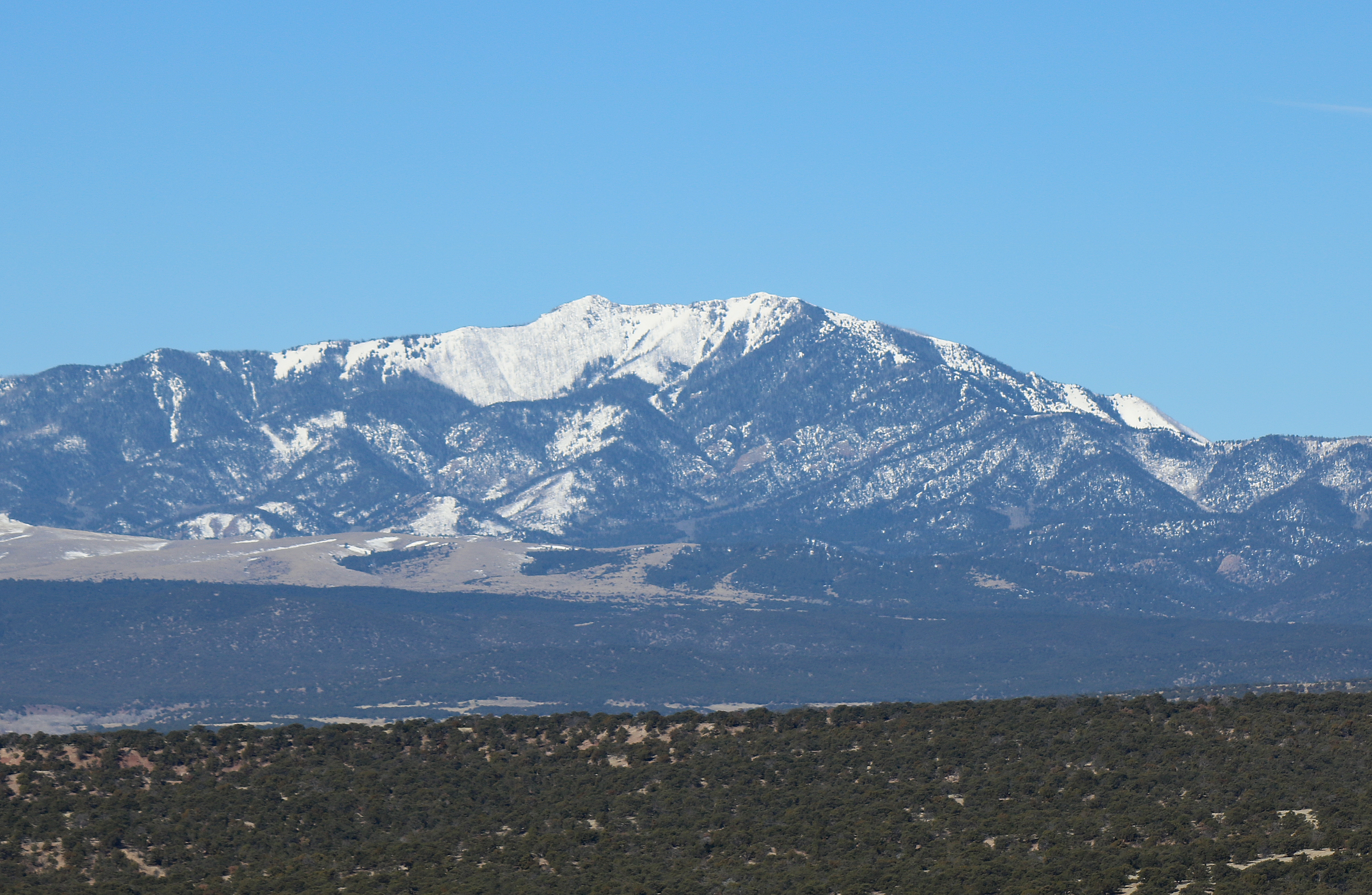
- East aspect

Highest point
- Elevation: 12,011 ft (3,661 m)
- Prominence: 2,266 ft (691 m)
- Isolation: 4.44 mi (7.15 km)
- Listing: Colorado prominent summits
- Coordinates: 37°47′28″N 105°27′19″W

Geography
- Location within Colorado
- Location: Huerfano and Saguache counties, Colorado, United States
- Parent range: Sangre de Cristo Range
- Topo map(s): USGS 7.5' topographic map Medano Pass, Colorado

Mount Zwischen is a prominent mountain summit in the Sangre de Cristo Range of the Rocky Mountains of North America. The 12,011-foot (3,661 m) peak is located 32.1 miles (51.6 km) northeast (bearing 46°) of the City of Alamosa, Colorado, United States, on the drainage divide separating the Great Sand Dunes Wilderness in Great Sand Dunes National Preserve and Huerfano County from the Sangre de Cristo Wilderness in San Isabel National Forest and Saguache County.

== Mountain ==
The mountain's name means 'between' in German, and the mountain lies between Mosca Pass to the south and Medano Pass to the north. But it also lies between several other geographical pairs. For example, it lies between the Rio Grande National Forest on the west and the San Isabel National Forest to the east. Its west side is in Saguache County and its east side is in Huerfano County.

A lightning-caused wildfire — the Medano Fire — burned 6,000 acres (2,400 ha) on and around the mountain's slopes in 2010.

== Historical names ==
- Green Mountain
- Mount Zwischen – 1970

== See also ==
- List of Colorado mountain ranges
- List of Colorado mountain summits
  - List of Colorado fourteeners
  - List of Colorado 4000 meter prominent summits
  - List of the most prominent summits of Colorado
- List of Colorado county high points
