= Lone Cone (Colorado) =

Mountain in Colorado, United States

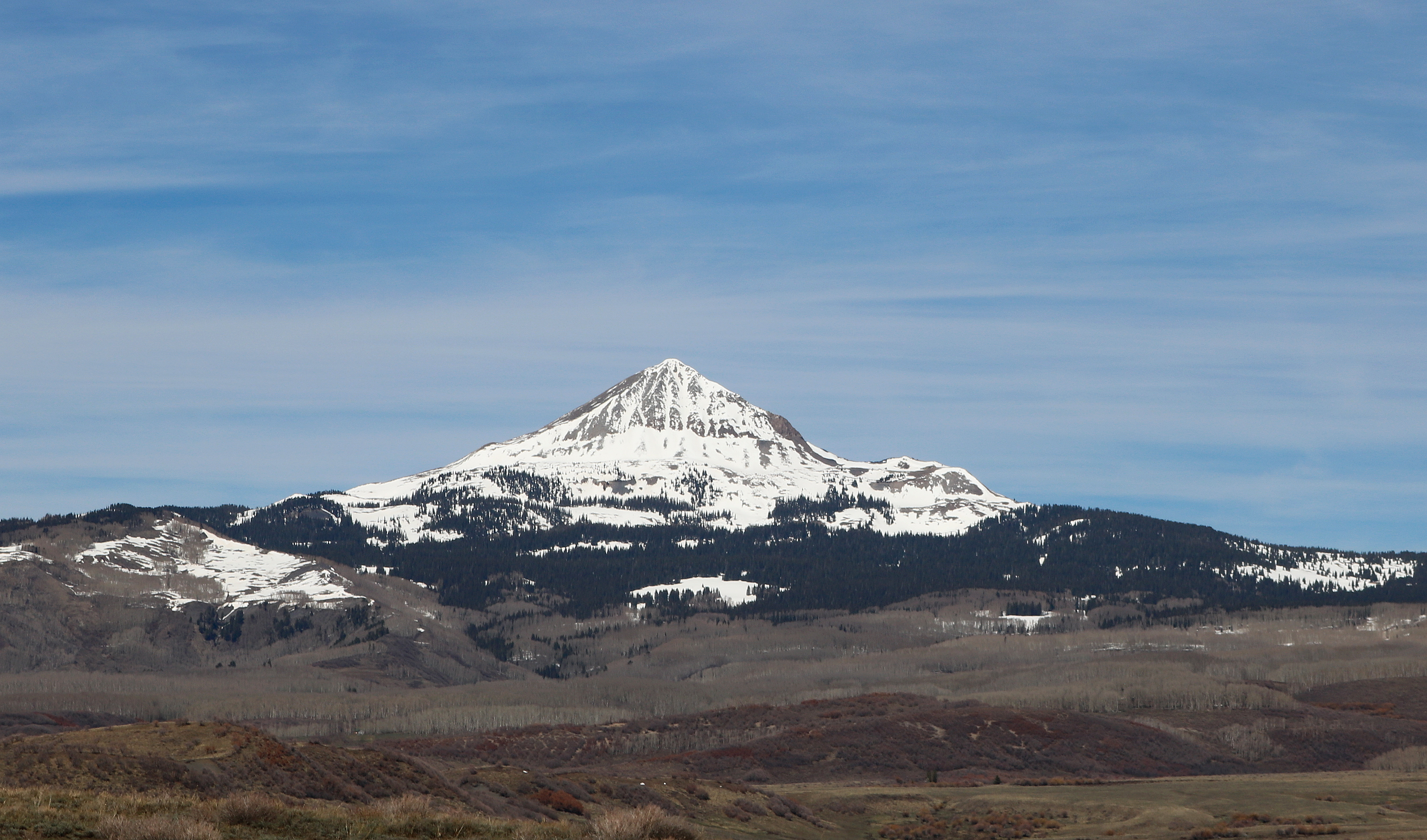
- Lone Cone from the south

Highest point
- Elevation: 12,618 ft (3,846 m)
- Prominence: 2,273 ft (693 m)
- Isolation: 8.40 mi (13.52 km)
- Listing: Colorado prominent summits
- Coordinates: 37°53′17″N 108°15′20″W

Geography
- Location within Colorado
- Location: Dolores and San Miguel counties, Colorado, United States
- Parent range: San Miguel Mountains
- Topo map(s): USGS 7.5' topographic map Lone Cone, Colorado

Lone Cone is a prominent mountain summit at the western end of the San Miguel Mountains range of the Rocky Mountains of North America. The 12,618-foot (3,846 m) peak is located 24.2 miles (38.9 km) west by south (bearing 262°) of the Town of Telluride, Colorado, United States, on the drainage divide separating San Juan National Forest and Dolores County from Uncompahgre National Forest and San Miguel County.

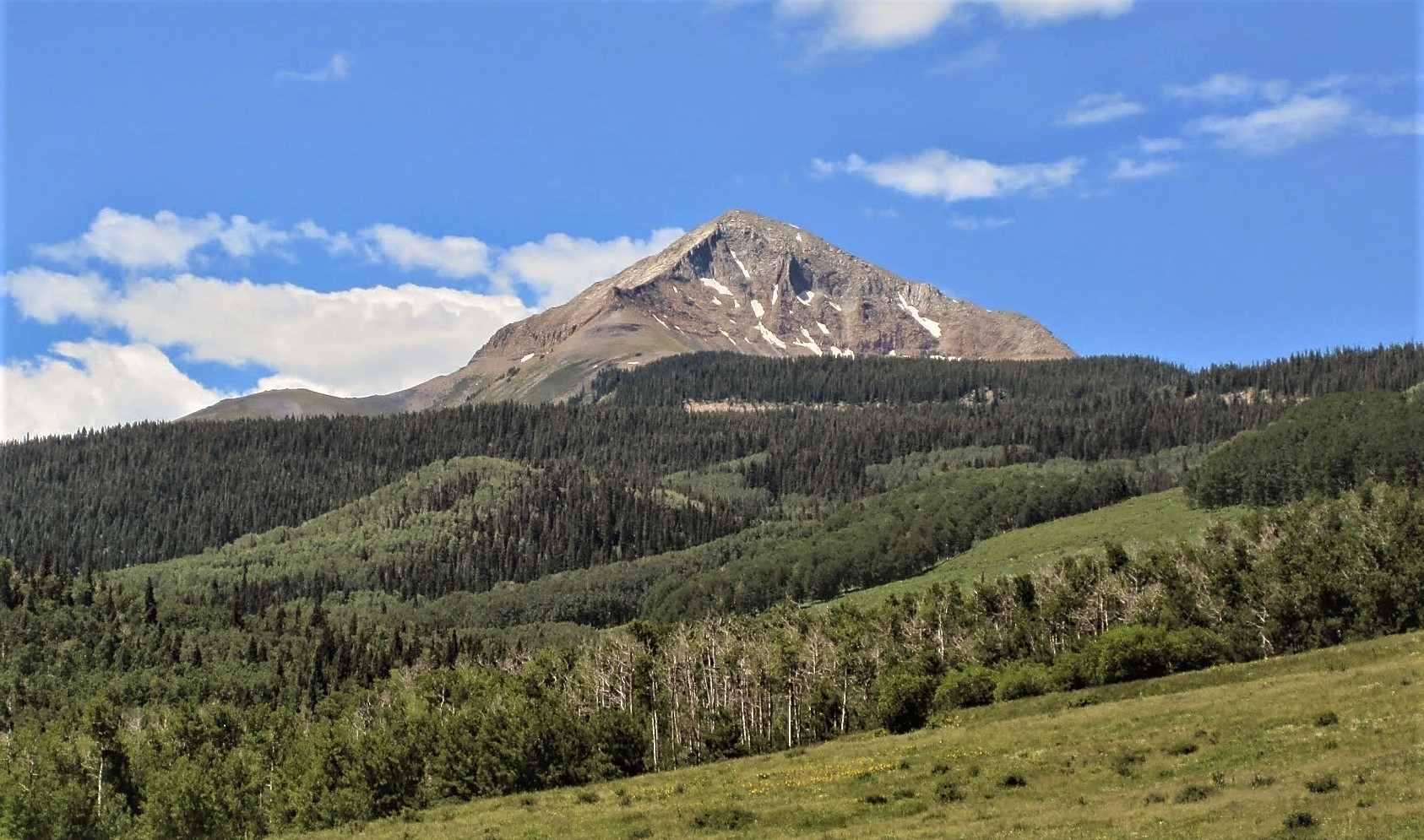
Lone Cone from the northeast

== Geology ==
The mountain, a laccolith, is between 20 and 40 million years old and is the westernmost of over a dozen laccoliths that are the same age as rocks in the San Juan volcanic field.

== Historical names ==
- Lone Cone – 1906
- West Point

== See also ==
- List of Colorado mountain ranges
- List of Colorado mountain summits
  - List of Colorado fourteeners
  - List of Colorado 4000 meter prominent summits
  - List of the most prominent summits of Colorado
- List of Colorado county high points
