= Mount Mestas =

Peak in the Rocky Mountains, in southern Colorado

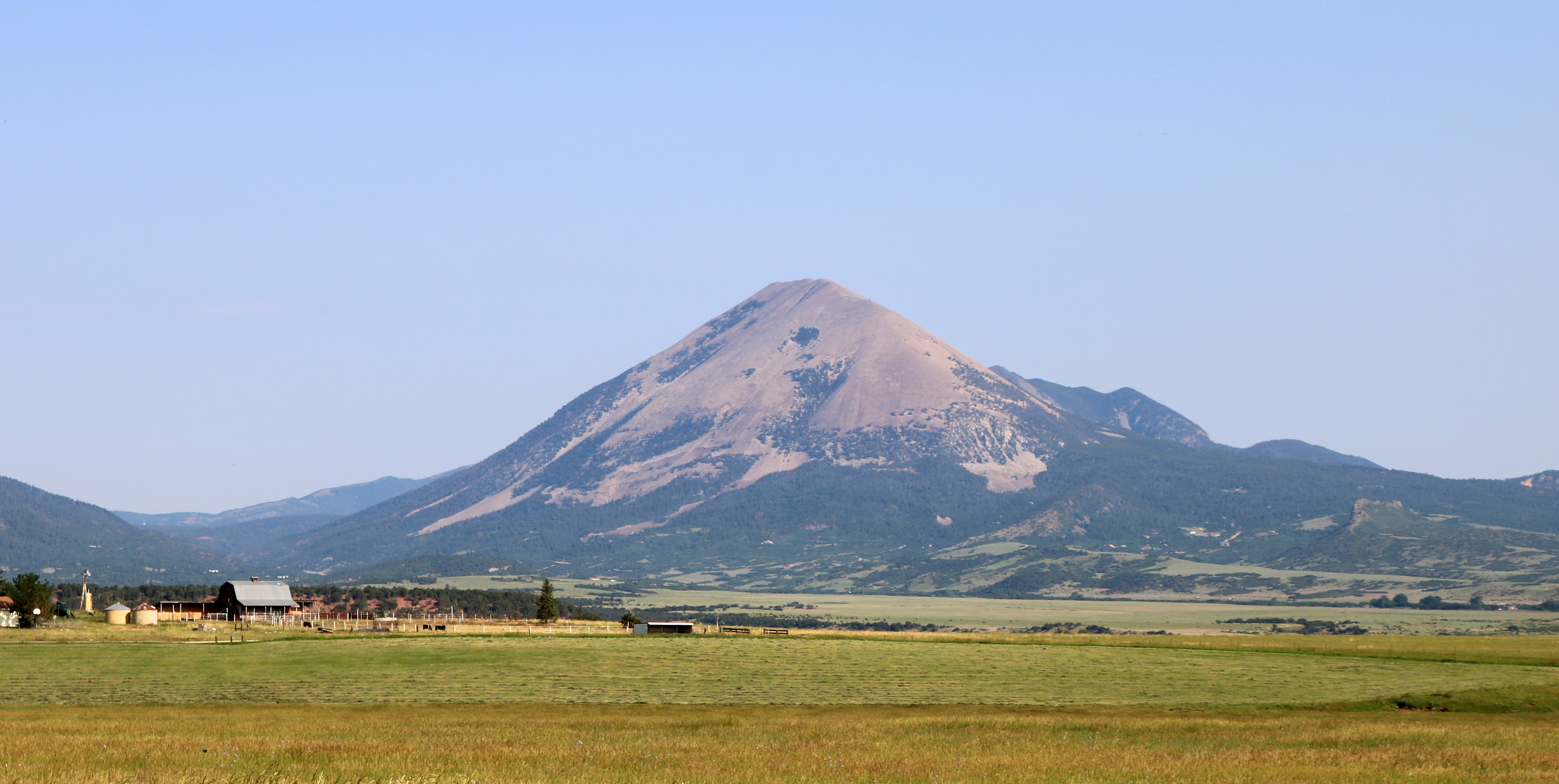
- A view of Mount Mestas from the Cuchara Valley.

Highest point
- Elevation: 11,573 ft (3,527 m)
- Prominence: 2,229 ft (679 m)
- Isolation: 16.33 mi (26.28 km)
- Listing: Colorado prominent summits
- Coordinates: 37°34′58″N 105°08′50″W

Geography
- Location within Colorado
- Location: Huerfano County, Colorado, U.S.
- Parent range: Sangre de Cristo Range
- Topo map(s): USGS 7.5' topographic map La Veta Pass, Colorado

Mount Mestas is a mountain summit in the southeastern Sangre de Cristo Range of the Rocky Mountains of North America. The 11,573-foot (3,527 m) peak is located 3.2 miles (5.1 km) southeast (bearing 131°) of North La Veta Pass in Huerfano County, Colorado, United States. The mountain was known as La Veta Peak until 1949 when it was renamed in honor of PFC Felix B. Mestas Jr. who was killed in action during the Second World War.

== Historical names ==
- Mt. Baldy
- Baldy Peak
- La Veta Peak – 1908
- Mount Mestas – 1949
- Veta Mountain
- Veta Peak

== See also ==
- List of Colorado mountain ranges
- List of Colorado mountain summits
  - List of Colorado fourteeners
  - List of Colorado 4000 meter prominent summits
  - List of the most prominent summits of Colorado
- List of Colorado county high points
