= Little Cone =

Mountain in the state of Colorado

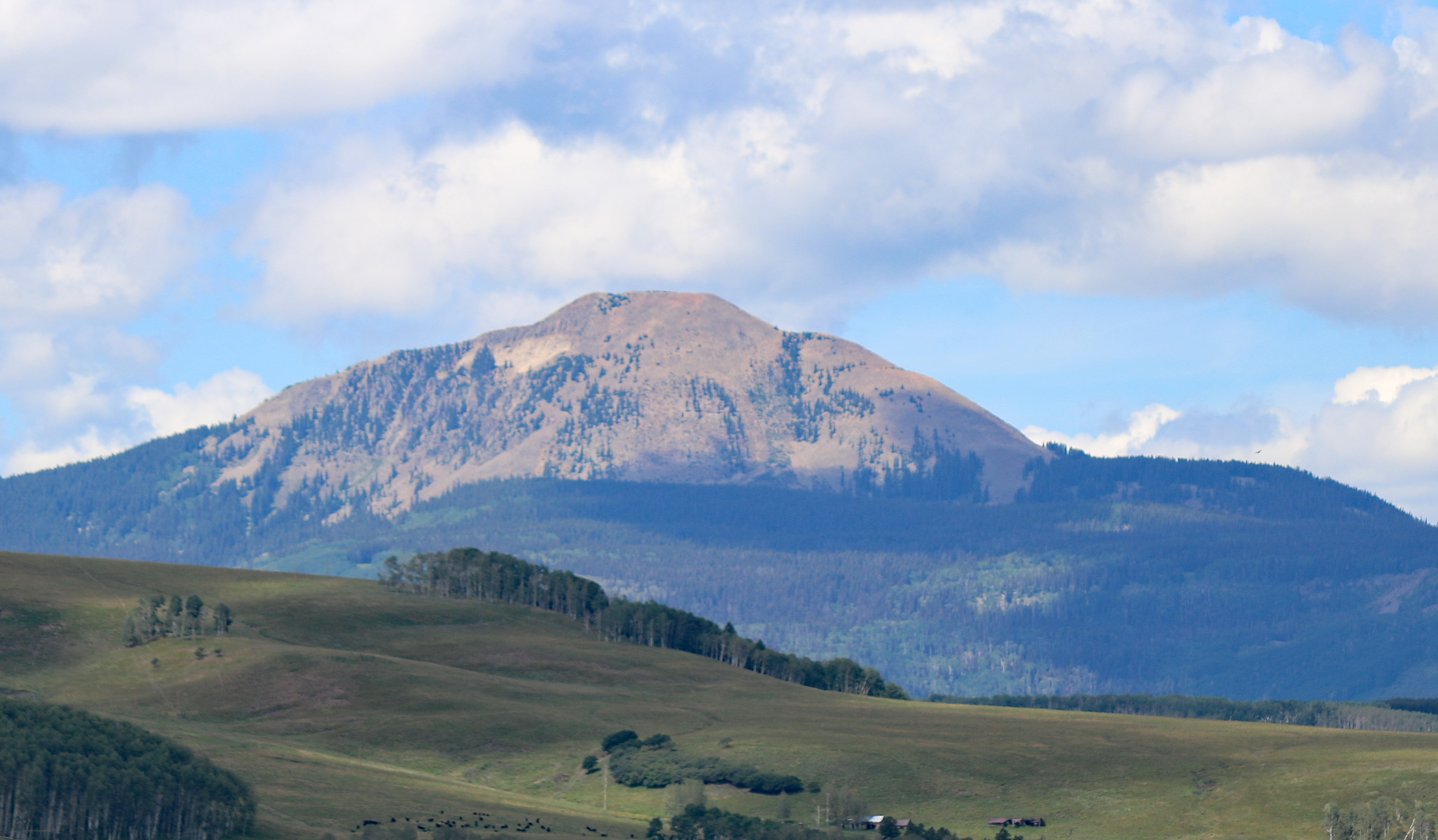
- The mountain viewed from near Telluride.

Highest point
- Elevation: 11,988 ft (3,654 m)
- Prominence: 1,840 ft (561 m)
- Isolation: 5.19 mi (8.35 km)
- Listing: Colorado prominent summits
- Coordinates: 37°55′39″N 108°05′27″W

Geography
- Location: San Miguel County, Colorado, United States
- Parent range: San Miguel Mountains
- Topo map(s): USGS 7.5' topographic map Little Cone, Colorado

Little Cone is a prominent mountain summit in the San Miguel Mountains range of the Rocky Mountains of North America. The 11,988-foot (3,654 m) peak is located in Uncompahgre National Forest, 15.0 miles (24.1 km) west (bearing 267°) of the Town of Telluride in San Miguel County, Colorado, United States. Little Cone is a laccolith, formed by underground intrusion of magma in the Miocene.

== Geology ==
The area around Little Cone contains features characteristic of both the Colorado Plateau physiographic province and the San Juan Mountains, and it has been affected by geologic events and processes of two different geologic environments.

The continental sedimentary rocks of the Cutler Formation of Permian age are the oldest rocks exposed in the area. Deposition of the Cutler was followed by a long period of erosion and peneplanation. There is no marked angular discordance between the Cutler and the overlying Dolores Formation in the Little Cone area. The continental sedimentary rocks of the Dolores Formation of Late Triassic age are red beds that are similar in gross lithology to those of the Cutler. A second long period of erosion followed deposition of the Dolores.

The Entrada Sandstone of Late Jurassic age overlies the Dolores formation, and is in turn overlain by the Wanakah Formation, also of Late Jurassic age. The Morrison Formation overlies the Wanakah, consists of the Salt Wash Sandstone member in the lower part and the Brushy Basin Shale member in the upper part. A period of erosion, probably of relatively short duration, followed deposition of the Brushy Basin member. The Burro Canyon Formation of Early Cretaceous age occurs as discontinuous bodies that fill channels cut in the top of the Morrison formation. Deposition of the Burro Canyon formation was followed by another period of erosion, which in turn ended with deposition of the Dakota Sandstone of Late Cretaceous age. The Dakota sandstone grades upward into the Mancos Shale, also of Late Cretaceous age.

The Paleozoic and Mesozoic formations were broadly folded during the Laramide orogeny, and the San Juan Mountains area was uplifted as a broad dome. Extensive erosion followed deformation, and the Cretaceous rocks in the area of Little Cone quadrangle were successively bevelled. The Telluride Conglomerate of Eocene age was laid down on this surface. In the Little Cone area, several hundred feet of the Telluride was deposited upon a considerable thickness (probably 910 meters/3,000 ft or more) of the Mancos Shale. Volcanic rocks of Miocene age were deposited widely upon the Telluride Conglomerate; at one time they had a thickness of probably 300 meters (1,000 ft) or more in the area. They have been eroded completely from the area.

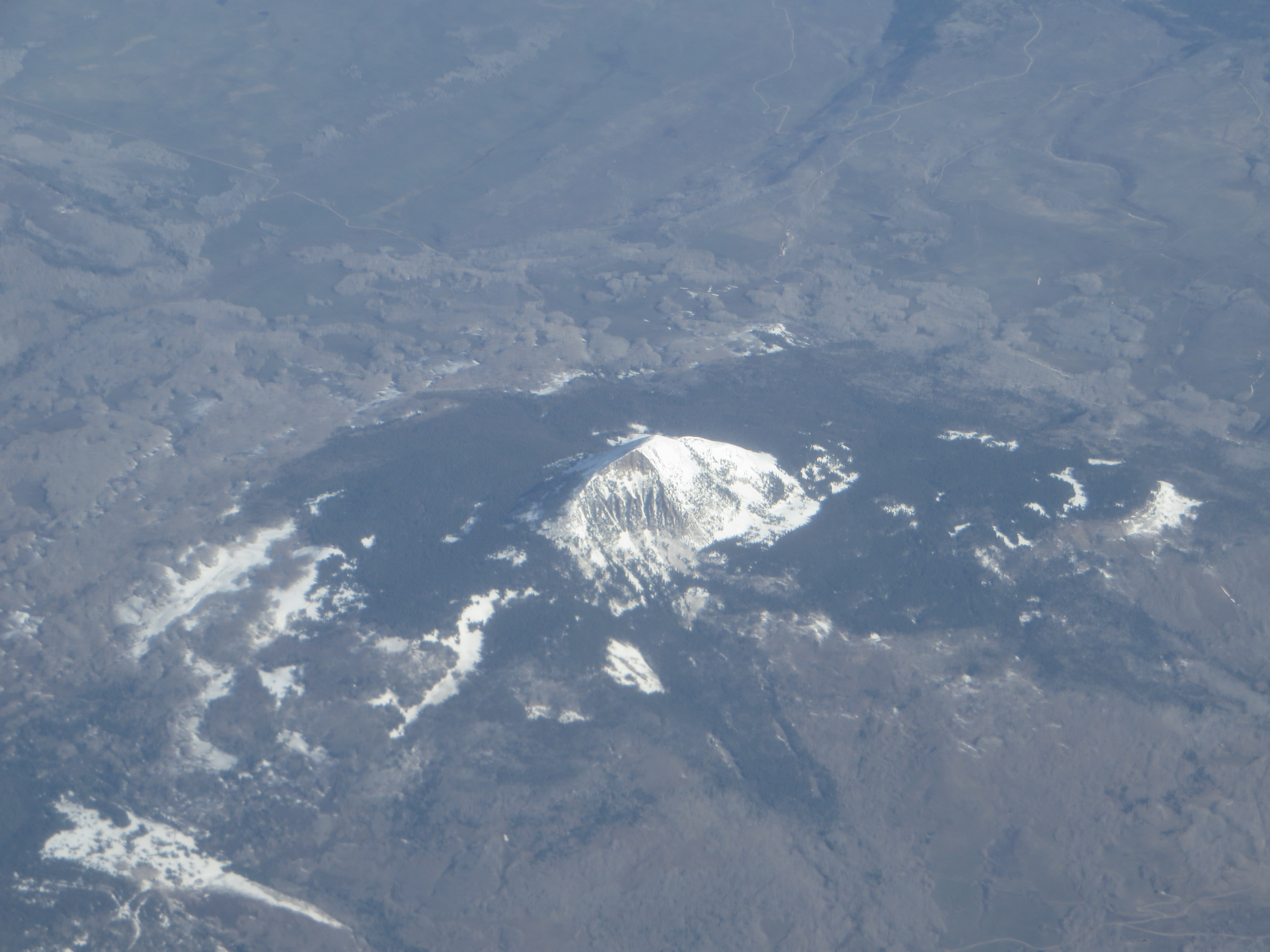
Aerial photo of Little Cone showing the laccolith structure.

During the Miocene, the sedimentary rocks were cut by many igneous bodies. Four major rock types are represented: in decreasing order of abundance they are granogabbro, granodiorite, rhyolite, and microgabbro. The granogabbro is by far the most abundant, and it forms the Little Cone laccolith. The granodiorite forms sills in the Dakota Sandstone and the Mancos Shale, and the rhyolite forms a single major sill in the Dakota. The microgabbro forms dikes that cut rocks as young as the Mancos Shale. Metamorphic effects adjacent to the intrusive bodies generally are restricted to baking that extends only a few feet out into the enclosing rocks; in many places no metamorphic effects are evident.

The rocks in the Little Cone area were displaced along numerous faults in the Miocene, probably after the igneous rocks were injected. All of the faults are norma, and have vertical or very steep dips. In part, the faults form two long and narrow northward- and northwestward-trending grabens. The graben faults form two systems, one trending northward to northwestward, and the other trending northwestward, that are probably contemporaneous. Other faults trend eastward to northeastward; some of these appear to be related to the intrusion of the igneous rocks.

In the Early Pleistocene, the general area was again uplifted and subjected to extensive erosion. The Mancos Shale was stripped from the northern part of the Little Cone area, and in that part of the area, the upland surfaces formed on top of the Dakota Sandstone were largely controlled by the geologic structure. During the Quaternary, a basalt flow was erupted on Specie Mesa on a surface that cuts both the Mancos and the Dakota. The surface preserved beneath the flow has virtually the same position and slope as the adjacent present-day surfaces. Pleistocene deposits consist of (a) high-level or older drift that is unrelated to the present drainage systems and is correlated with early Pleistocene glaciation, and (b) younger drift and valley fill within the valleys of the present drainage systems that are correlated with the Durango or Wisconsin glacial stages and may represent both. Recent surficial, landslide, and spring deposits are also present.

Within the Little Cone area, the Entrada Sandstone of Late Jurassic age contains vanadium deposits with which are associated large but low-grade amounts of uranium. These deposits form a practically continuous layer about 16 kilometers (10 mi) long and 1.6 to 2.4 kilometers (1 to 1.5 mi) wide, and possibly a second layer of smaller dimensions. Placer gold deposits in terrace gravel and valley fill of Pleistocene age and in alluvium of Holocene age contain the only other ores.

== See also ==
- List of Colorado mountain ranges
- List of Colorado mountain summits
  - List of Colorado fourteeners
  - List of Colorado 4000 meter prominent summits
  - List of the most prominent summits of Colorado
- List of Colorado county high points
