= Elliott Mountain =

Mountain in Colorado, United States

- Location within Colorado

Highest point
- Elevation: 12,346 ft (3,763 m)
- Prominence: 2,240 ft (683 m)
- Isolation: 5.13 mi (8.26 km)
- Listing: Colorado prominent summits
- Coordinates: 37°44′04″N 108°03′29″W

Geography
- Location: Dolores County, Colorado, U.S.
- Parent range: San Miguel Mountains
- Topo map(s): USGS 7.5' topographic map Rico, Colorado

Elliot Mountain is a prominent mountain summit in the San Miguel Mountains of the Rocky Mountains of North America. The 12,346-foot (3,763 m) peak is located in San Juan National Forest, 3.5 miles (5.6 km) north-northwest (bearing 335°) of the Town of Rico in Dolores County, Colorado, United States.

== See also ==
- List of Colorado mountain ranges
- List of Colorado mountain summits
  - List of Colorado fourteeners
  - List of Colorado 4000 meter prominent summits
  - List of the most prominent summits of Colorado
- List of Colorado county high points
