= Graham Peak (Colorado) =

Mountain in Colorado, United States

- Location within Colorado

Highest point
- Elevation: 12,536 ft (3,821 m)
- Prominence: 2,551 ft (778 m)
- Isolation: 8.64 mi (13.90 km)
- Listing: Colorado prominent summits
- Coordinates: 37°29′50″N 107°22′34″W

Geography
- Location: Hinsdale County, Colorado, U.S.
- Parent range: San Juan Mountains
- Topo map(s): USGS 7.5' topographic map Granite Peak, Colorado

Graham Peak is a prominent mountain summit in the San Juan Mountains, a range of the Rocky Mountains System in southwestern Colorado

The 12,536-foot (3,821 m) peak is located in the Weminuche Wilderness of San Juan National Forest, 37.0 miles (59.6 km) south (bearing 185°) of the Town of Lake City in Hinsdale County, Colorado.

== See also ==
- List of the most prominent summits of Colorado
- List of Colorado county high points
- List of Colorado mountain ranges
- List of Colorado mountain summits
