= Tomichi Dome =

Igneous mountain in Colorado, US

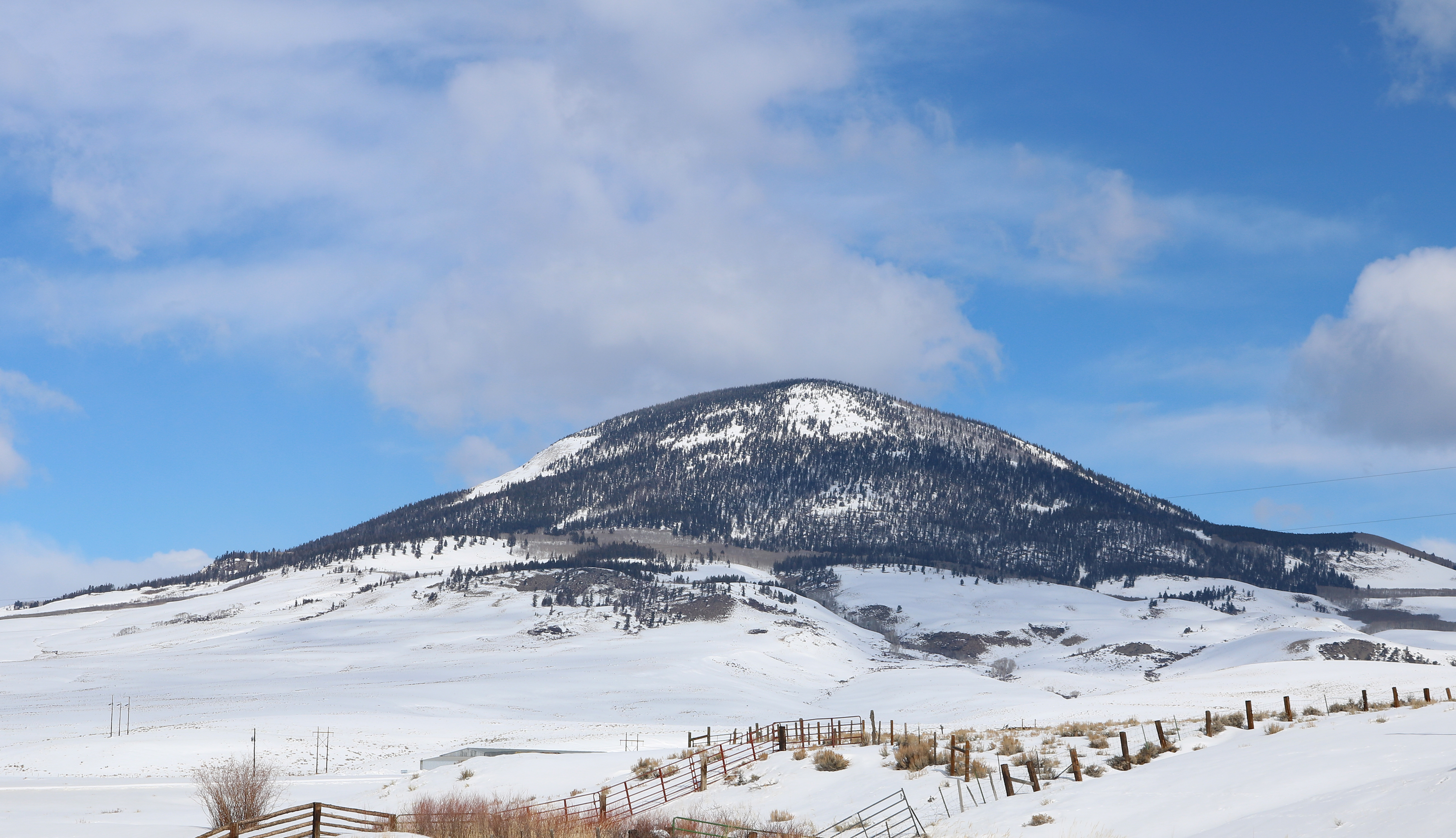
- Tomichi Dome viewed from U.S. Route 50

Highest point
- Elevation: 11,471 ft (3,496 m)
- Prominence: 2,325 ft (709 m)
- Isolation: 10.74 mi (17.28 km)
- Listing: Colorado prominent summits
- Coordinates: 38°29′06″N 106°31′44″W

Geography
- Location within Colorado
- Location: Gunnison County, Colorado, U.S.
- Parent range: Sawatch Range
- Topo map(s): USGS 7.5' topographic map Doyleville, Colorado

Tomichi Dome (Note: Pronounced /toʊˈmiːtʃiː/.) rises north of U.S. Highway 50 west of Hot Springs Creek and south of Waunita Hot Springs Reservoir in the southeast quarter of Gunnison County, Colorado. It is situated within the Gunnison National Forest.

== Geology ==
Tomichi Dome is a prominent igneous mountain formed during the Tertiary. The predominant rock is rhyolite, but microgranite, breccia, and tuff have been cited as present. Surrounding the mountain, on the valley floor, is Mancos Shale, a Mesozoic sedimentary rock.

Tomchi Dome has been described as an intrusion and also as an extrusive, volcanic feature. As an intrusion, the pluton may have formed when magma was intruded into the Mancos Shale resulting in a laccolith. Given the fine-grained texture of the rock, the laccolith is assumed to have been at a shallow depth and cooled rapidly. Venting may have been associated with the intrusion resulting in the rhyolytic breccia and tuff documented in the vicinity. Shallow rhyolitic plutons southwest of Tomichi Dome, in the San Juan Mountains near Lake City, have also been described as laccoliths.

Alternatively, Tomichi Dome has been described as an extrusive, volcanic feature where the initial eruptions deposited breccia and tuff that is over 670 feet (200 m) thick. A flow or dome of topaz rhyolite overlies the tuff.

Whether plutonic or volcanic, Tomichi Dome is possibly one of a string of igneous structures associated with the Rio Grande Rift, which stretches from Mexico to Colorado.

== Historical names ==
- Tomichi Dome – 1907
- Tumitche Dome

== See also ==
- List of Colorado mountain ranges
- List of Colorado mountain summits
  - List of Colorado fourteeners
  - List of Colorado 4000 meter prominent summits
  - List of the most prominent summits of Colorado
- List of Colorado county high points

== Notes ==
- Maps:
  - Gunnison Basin Public Lands. Forest Service Series Map. United States Department of Agriculture. Colorado, 2008.
