= Sleepy Cat Peak =

Mountain in Colorado, United States

- Location within Colorado

Highest point
- Elevation: 10,853 ft (3,308 m)
- Prominence: 2,348 ft (716 m)
- Isolation: 10.64 mi (17.12 km)
- Listing: Colorado prominent summits
- Coordinates: 40°07′39″N 107°32′01″W

Geography
- Location: Rio Blanco County, Colorado, United States
- Parent range: Flat Tops
- Topo map(s): USGS 7.5' topographic map Sleepy Cat Peak, Colorado

Climbing
- Easiest route: hike

Sleepy Cat Peak, elevation 10,853 ft (3,308 m), is a summit in the Flat Tops of northwest Colorado. The mountain is east of Meeker in the White River National Forest of Rio Blanco County.

== See also ==
- List of Colorado mountain summits
- List of Colorado county high points
