= Columbus Mountain =

Mountain in Colorado, United States

- Location within Colorado

Highest point
- Elevation: 10,253 ft (3,125 m) NAVD 88
- Prominence: 1,893 ft (577 m)
- Listing: Colorado prominent summits
- Coordinates: 40°52′47″N 107°11′32″W

Geography
- Location: Routt County, Colorado, U.S.
- Parent range: Elkhead Mountains
- Topo map: USGS Tumble Mountain

Columbus Mountain, elevation 10,253 ft (3,125 m), is a summit in the Elkhead Mountains of northern Colorado, United States. The mountain is northwest of Steamboat Springs in the Routt National Forest.

== See also ==
- Mountain peaks of Colorado
- Mountain ranges of Colorado
