= Twin Sisters Peaks =

Mountain in Colorado, United States

Twin Sisters East Peak
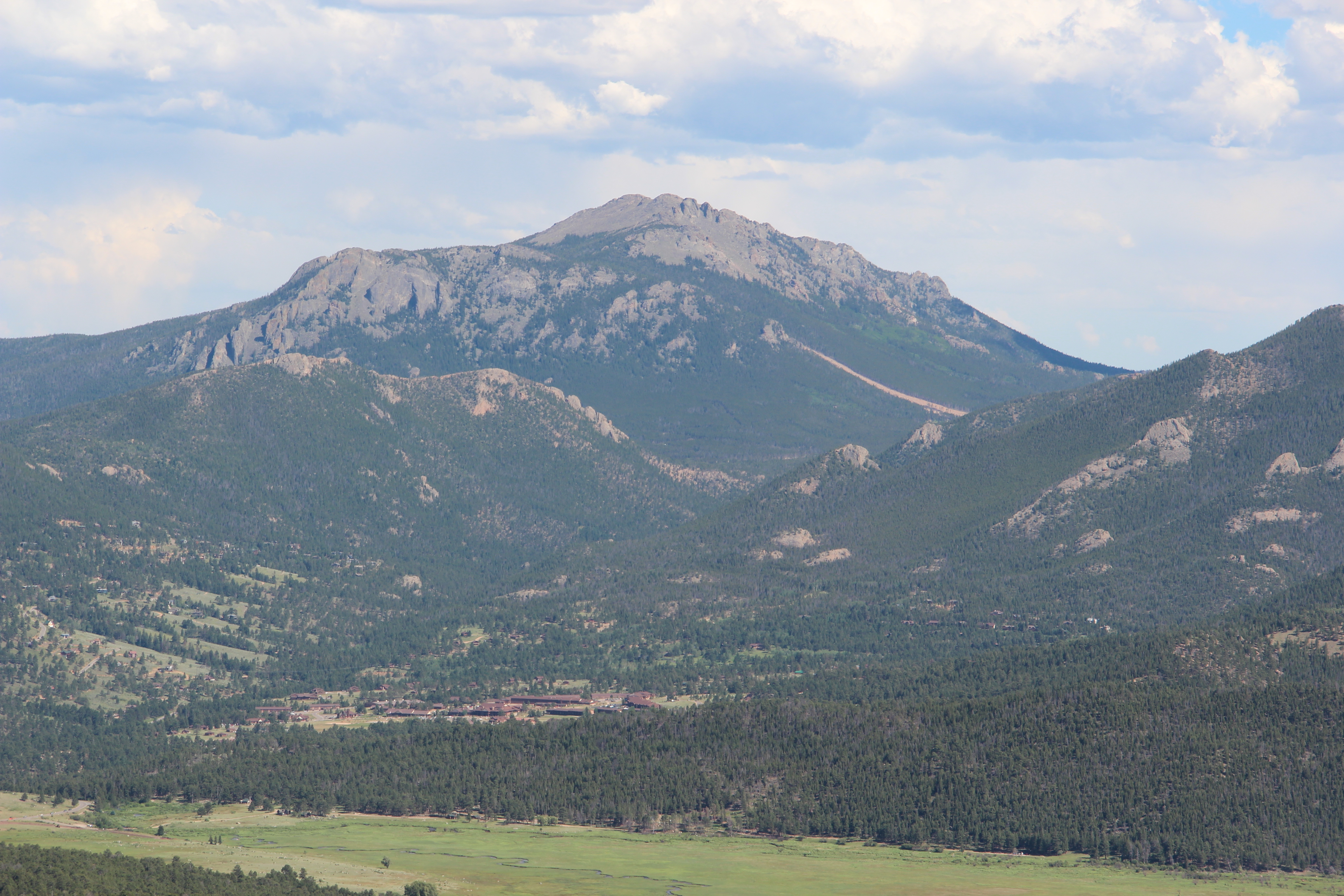
- Twin Sisters Peaks viewed from Trail Ridge Road

Highest point
- Elevation: 11,433 ft (3,485 m)
- Prominence: 2,298 ft (700 m)
- Isolation: 4.36 mi (7.02 km)
- Listing: Colorado prominent summits
- Coordinates: 40°17′20″N 105°31′06″W

Geography
- Location within Colorado
- Location: Rocky Mountain National Park, Larimer County, Colorado, U.S.
- Parent range: Front Range
- Topo map(s): USGS 7.5' topographic map Longs Peak, Colorado

Climbing
- Easiest route: hike, scramble

Twin Sisters West Peak

Highest point
- Elevation: 11,418 ft (3,480 m)
- Coordinates: 40°17′21″N 105°31′10″W

The Twin Sisters Peaks are mountains in Colorado, located in the Front Range in Larimer County, Colorado, straddling Rocky Mountain National Park and Roosevelt National Forest.

== History ==
The mountain was originally known amongst Estes Park locals as Lily Mountain until the name Twin Sisters Peaks was submitted to the Washington Geographic Board on March 7, 1907 by Ellsworth Bethel. The first trail to the summit was constructed in 1914, at the same time the first fire lookout was established at the top by the Forest Service. In 1917, the mountain was officially made part of Rocky Mountain National Park's eastern boundary. Swiss mountaineer Walter Kiener was the first RMNP ranger to operate the fire lookout, serving in this position for five summers. Kiener's presence on the mountain increased visitor traffic and helped to popularize the hike with tourists. In 1936, the trail was reconstructed by the Civilian Conservation Corps. The ranger station was later razed in 1977, although its remains are still visible on the summit.

During the Colorado front range floods of 2013, the western side of the mountain experienced a large mudslide, which left a large muddy scar and wiped out several switchbacks of the trail. The trail was later re-defined within the scar to allow hiking to resume, but the damage is still visible from afar.

== Historical names ==
- Lillie Mountain
- Lillie Mountains
- Tahosa Mountain
- Twin Sisters Peaks – 1908

== See also ==
- List of Colorado mountain ranges
- List of Colorado mountain summits
  - List of Colorado fourteeners
  - List of Colorado 4000 meter prominent summits
  - List of the most prominent summits of Colorado
- List of Colorado county high points
