= Tanks Peak =

Mountain in the state of Colorado

- Location within Colorado

Highest point
- Elevation: 8,726 ft (2,660 m)
- Prominence: 2,247 ft (685 m)
- Isolation: 13.66 mi (21.98 km)
- Listing: Colorado prominent summits
- Coordinates: 40°25′33″N 108°45′58″W

Geography
- Location: Moffat County, Colorado, U.S.
- Parent range: Uinta Range
- Topo map(s): USGS 7.5' topographic map Tanks Peak, Colorado

Climbing
- Easiest route: hike

Tanks Peak, elevation 8,726 ft (2,660 m), is a summit in the Uinta Range located northeast of Dinosaur in Moffat County, Colorado.

== Historical names ==
- Tank Peak
- Tanks Peak

== See also ==
- List of Colorado mountain ranges
- List of Colorado mountain summits
  - List of Colorado fourteeners
  - List of Colorado 4000 meter prominent summits
  - List of the most prominent summits of Colorado
- List of Colorado county high points
