= Park Cone =

Mountain in the state of Colorado

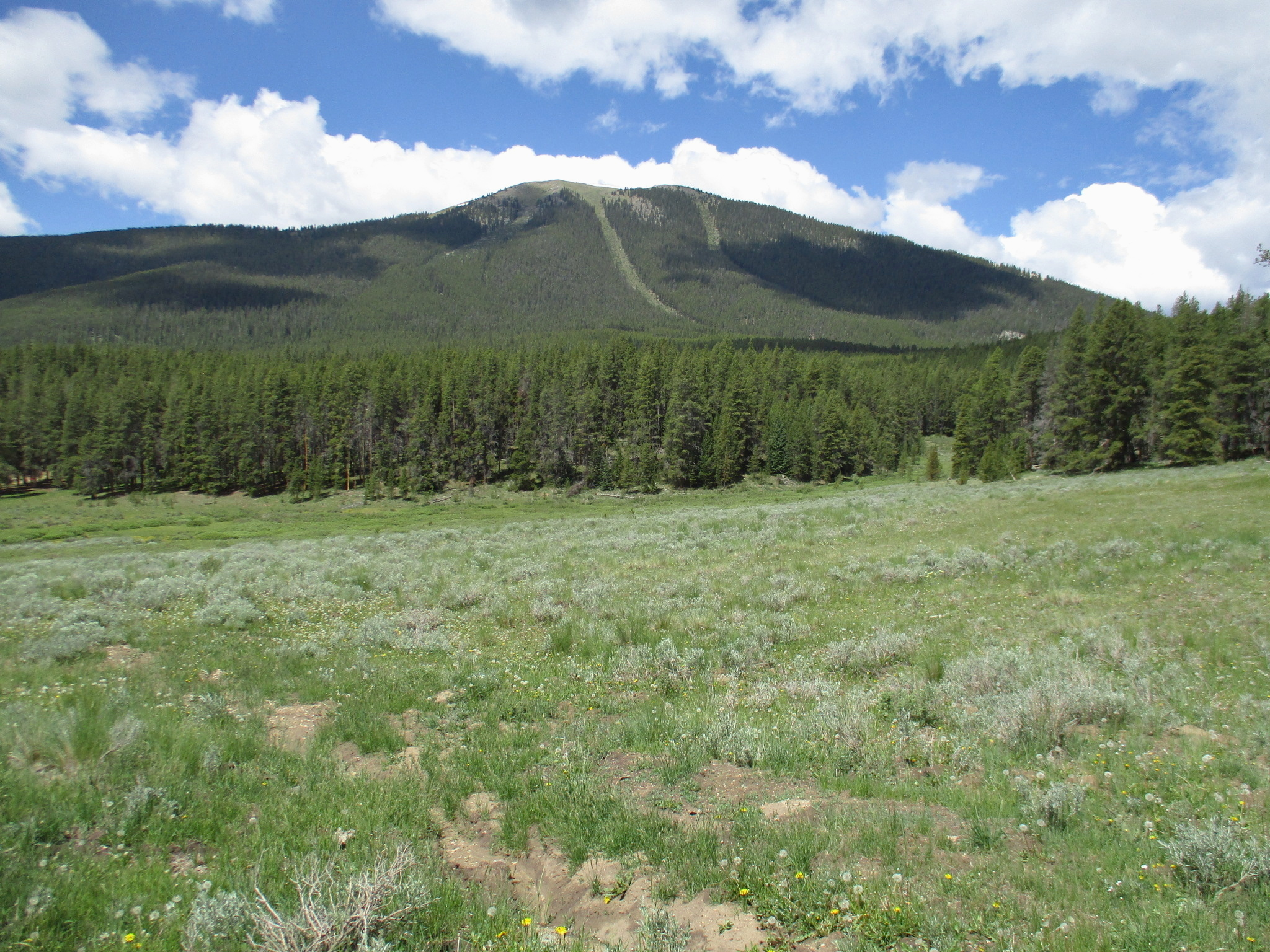
- Park Cone

Highest point
- Elevation: 12,106 ft (3,690 m)
- Prominence: 2,040 ft (622 m)
- Isolation: 3.44 mi (5.54 km)
- Listing: Colorado prominent summits
- Coordinates: 38°47′48″N 106°36′11″W

Geography
- Location within Colorado
- Location: Gunnison County, Colorado, U.S.
- Parent range: Sawatch Range
- Topo map(s): USGS 7.5' topographic map Taylor Park Reservoir, Colorado

Park Cone, elevation 12,106 ft (3,690 m), is a summit in the Sawatch Range of central Colorado. The mountain is northeast of Gunnison in the Gunnison National Forest.

== See also ==
- List of Colorado mountain ranges
- List of Colorado mountain summits
  - List of Colorado fourteeners
  - List of Colorado 4000 meter prominent summits
  - List of the most prominent summits of Colorado
- List of Colorado county high points
