= List of the most prominent summits of Colorado =

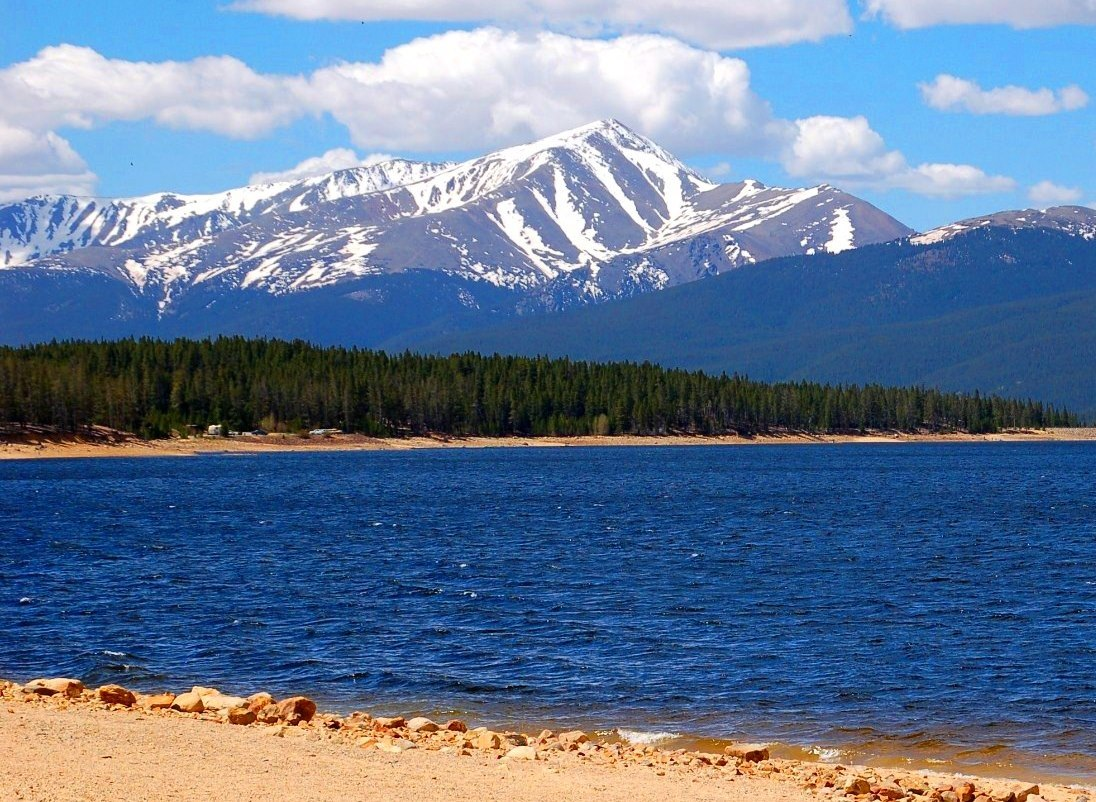
Mount Elbert in the Sawatch Range is the highest peak of the Rocky Mountains and the highest point in Colorado.

The following sortable table comprises the 100 most topographically prominent mountain peaks of the U.S. State of Colorado.

Topographic elevation is the vertical distance above the reference geoid, a mathematical model of the Earth's sea level as an equipotential gravitational surface. The topographic prominence of a summit is the elevation difference between that summit and the highest or key col to a higher summit. The topographic isolation of a summit is the minimum great-circle distance to a point of equal elevation.

This article defines a significant summit as a summit with at least 100 meters (328.1 feet) of topographic prominence, and a major summit as a summit with at least 500 meters (1640 feet) of topographic prominence. An ultra-prominent summit is a summit with at least 1500 meters (4921 feet) of topographic prominence. There are 126 ultra-prominent summits in the United States.

All elevations include an adjustment from the National Geodetic Vertical Datum of 1929 (NGVD 29) to the North American Vertical Datum of 1988 (NAVD 88). For further information, please see this United States National Geodetic Survey note.

If an elevation or prominence is calculated as a range of values, the arithmetic mean is shown.

== Most prominent summits ==
The 100 most topographically prominent Colorado summits
Rank	Mountain Peak	Mountain Range	Elevation	Prominence	Isolation	Location
1	Mount Elbert (Note: The summit of Mount Elbert is the highest point of the Rocky Mountains and the U.S. State of Colorado.)	Sawatch Range	14,440 ft 4401.2 m	9,093 ft 2772 m	671 mi 1,079 km	39.1178°N 106.4454°W
2	Pikes Peak (Note: Pikes Peak is the easternmost 14,000-foot (4267.2 m) summit of the United States. Pikes Peak was the inspiration for the lyrics of America the Beautiful.)	Front Range	14,115 ft 4302.31 m	5,530 ft 1686 m	60.8 mi 97.8 km	38.8405°N 105.0442°W
3	Blanca Peak (Note: The summit of Blanca Peak is the highest point of the Sangre de Cristo Mountains.) (Note: The elevation of Blanca Peak includes an adjustment of +1.755 m (5.76 ft) from NGVD 29 to NAVD 88.)	Sangre de Cristo Mountains	14,351 ft 4374 m	5,326 ft 1623 m	103.4 mi 166.4 km	37.5775°N 105.4856°W
4	Culebra Peak (Note: The summit of Culebra Peak is the highest point of the Culebra Range.) (Note: The elevation of Culebra Peak includes an adjustment of +1.74 m (5.71 ft) from NGVD 29 to NAVD 88.)	Culebra Range	14,053 ft 4283 m	4,827 ft 1471 m	35.5 mi 57.1 km	37.1224°N 105.1858°W
5	Crestone Peak (Note: The elevation of Crestone Peak includes an adjustment of +1.76 m (5.77 ft) from NGVD 29 to NAVD 88.)	Sangre de Cristo Range	14,300 ft 4359 m	4,554 ft 1388 m	27.4 mi 44.1 km	37.9669°N 105.5855°W
6	Uncompahgre Peak (Note: The summit of Uncompahgre Peak is the highest point of the San Juan Mountains.)	San Juan Mountains	14,321 ft 4365 m	4,277 ft 1304 m	85.1 mi 136.9 km	38.0717°N 107.4621°W
7	Flat Top Mountain (Note: The summit of Flat Top Mountain is the highest point of the Flat Tops.)	Flat Tops	12,361 ft 3767.7 m	4,054 ft 1236 m	40.8 mi 65.7 km	40.0147°N 107.0833°W
8	Ute Peak (Note: The summit of Ute Peak is the highest point of Ute Mountain.)	Ute Mountain	9,984 ft 3043 m	4,039 ft 1231 m	35.2 mi 56.7 km	37.2841°N 108.7787°W
9	Mount Wilson (Note: The summit of Mount Wilson is the highest point of the San Miguel Mountains.) (Note: The elevation of Mount Wilson includes an adjustment of +1.899 m (6.23 ft) from NGVD 29 to NAVD 88.)	San Miguel Mountains	14,252 ft 4344 m	4,024 ft 1227 m	33.1 mi 53.2 km	37.8391°N 107.9916°W
10	Mount Lincoln (Note: The summit of Mount Lincoln is the highest point of the Mosquito Range.)	Mosquito Range	14,293 ft 4356.5 m	3,862 ft 1177 m	22.6 mi 36.3 km	39.3515°N 106.1116°W
11	Greenhorn Mountain (Note: The summit of Greenhorn Mountain is the highest point of the Wet Mountains.)	Wet Mountains	12,352 ft 3765 m	3,777 ft 1151 m	25.6 mi 41.2 km	37.8815°N 105.0133°W
12	West Spanish Peak (Note: West Spanish Peak is the easternmost 4000 meter (13,123.4-foot) summit of the United States.) (Note: The elevation of West Spanish Peak includes an adjustment of +1.468 m (4.82 ft) from NGVD 29 to NAVD 88.)	Spanish Peaks	13,631 ft 4155 m	3,686 ft 1123 m	20.4 mi 32.9 km	37.3756°N 104.9934°W
13	Mount Gunnison	West Elk Mountains	12,725 ft 3878.7 m	3,539 ft 1079 m	11.84 mi 19.05 km	38.8121°N 107.3826°W
14	Mount Zirkel (Note: The summit of Mount Zirkel is the highest point of the Park Range.) (Note: The elevation of Mount Zirkel includes an adjustment of +1.632 m (5.35 ft) from NGVD 29 to NAVD 88.)	Park Range	12,185 ft 3714 m	3,470 ft 1058 m	38.1 mi 61.3 km	40.8313°N 106.6631°W
15	San Luis Peak (Note: The summit of San Luis Peak is the highest point of the La Garita Mountains.)	La Garita Mountains	14,022 ft 4273.8 m	3,113 ft 949 m	27 mi 43.4 km	37.9868°N 106.9313°W
16	North Mamm Peak	Front Range	11,126 ft 3391.3 m	3,103 ft 946 m	21.2 mi 34.2 km	39.3865°N 107.8660°W
17	West Elk Peak (Note: The summit of West Elk Peak is the highest point of the West Elk Mountains.)	West Elk Mountains	13,042 ft 3975.2 m	3,095 ft 943 m	13.78 mi 22.2 km	38.7179°N 107.1994°W
18	Huntsman Ridge (Note: The elevation of Huntsman Ridge includes an adjustment of +1.711 m (5.61 ft) from NGVD 29 to NAVD 88.) (Dutch Peak)	Elk Mountains	11,858 ft 3614 m	3,072 ft 936 m	10.3 mi 16.58 km	39.1920°N 107.3668°W
19	Mount Sneffels (Note: The summit of Mount Sneffels is the highest point of the Sneffels Range.)	Sneffels Range	14,158 ft 4315.4 m	3,050 ft 930 m	15.73 mi 25.3 km	38.0038°N 107.7923°W
20	Castle Peak (Note: The elevation of Castle Peak includes an adjustment of +1.575 m (5.17 ft) from NGVD 29 to NAVD 88.)	Sawatch Range	11,305 ft 3446 m	3,040 ft 927 m	16.73 mi 26.9 km	39.7723°N 106.8304°W
21	Mount Powell (Note: The summit of Mount Powell is the highest point of the Gore Range.) (Note: The elevation of Mount Powell includes an adjustment of +1.771 m (5.81 ft) from NGVD 29 to NAVD 88.)	Gore Range	13,586 ft 4141 m	3,000 ft 914 m	21.6 mi 34.8 km	39.7601°N 106.3407°W
22	Longs Peak (Note: The summit of Longs Peak is the highest point of the northern Front Range.)	Front Range	14,259 ft 4346 m	2,940 ft 896 m	43.6 mi 70.2 km	40.2550°N 105.6151°W
23	Hesperus Mountain (Note: The summit of Hesperus Mountain is the highest point of the La Plata Mountains.) (Note: The elevation of Hesperus Mountain includes an adjustment of +1.65 m (5.41 ft) from NGVD 29 to NAVD 88.)	La Plata Mountains	13,237 ft 4035 m	2,852 ft 869 m	24.8 mi 39.9 km	37.4451°N 108.0890°W
24	Diamond Peak (Note: The elevation of Diamond Peak includes an adjustment of +1.436 m (4.71 ft) from NGVD 29 to NAVD 88.)	Green River Basin	9,665 ft 2946 m	2,845 ft 867 m	30.3 mi 48.8 km	40.9504°N 108.8782°W
25	Treasure Mountain (Note: The elevation of Treasure Mountain includes an adjustment of +2.008 m (6.59 ft) from NGVD 29 to NAVD 88.)	Elk Mountains	13,535 ft 4125 m	2,828 ft 862 m	6.92 mi 11.13 km	39.0244°N 107.1228°W
26	Clark Peak (Note: The summit of Clark Peak is the highest point of the Medicine Bow Mountains.)	Medicine Bow Mountains	12,954 ft 3948.4 m	2,771 ft 845 m	16.66 mi 26.8 km	40.6068°N 105.9300°W
27	Grays Peak (Note: The summit of Grays Peak is the highest point of the Front Range and the Continental Divide of North America.)	Front Range	14,278 ft 4352 m	2,770 ft 844 m	25 mi 40.3 km	39.6339°N 105.8176°W
28	Mount Evans (Note: The summit elevation of Mount Evans includes a vertical offset of +1.798 m (5.9 ft) from the station benchmark.)	Front Range	14,271 ft 4350 m	2,770 ft 844 m	9.79 mi 15.76 km	39.5883°N 105.6438°W
29	Summit Peak (Note: The summit of Summit Peak is the highest point of the southern San Juan Mountains.)	San Juan Mountains	13,308 ft 4056.2 m	2,760 ft 841 m	39.9 mi 64.2 km	37.3506°N 106.6968°W
30	Marcellina Mountain (Note: The elevation of Marcellina Mountain includes an adjustment of +1.658 m (5.44 ft) from NGVD 29 to NAVD 88.)	West Elk Mountains	11,353 ft 3461 m	2,728 ft 831 m	5.08 mi 8.18 km	38.9299°N 107.2438°W
31	Mount Richthofen (Note: The summit of Mount Richthofen is the highest point of the Never Summer Mountains.) (Note: The elevation of Mount Richthofen includes an adjustment of +1.658 m (5.44 ft) from NGVD 29 to NAVD 88.)	Never Summer Mountains	12,945 ft 3946 m	2,680 ft 817 m	9.66 mi 15.54 km	40.4695°N 105.8945°W
31	Piñon Mesa High Point (Note: The elevation of Piñon Mesa High Point includes an adjustment of +1.408 m (4.62 ft) from NGVD 29 to NAVD 88.)	Uncompahgre Plateau	9,705 ft 2958 m	2,680 ft 817 m	26.4 mi 42.5 km	38.8260°N 108.7719°W
33	Parkview Mountain	Rabbit Ears Range	12,301 ft 3749.4 m	2,676 ft 816 m	9.36 mi 15.07 km	40.3303°N 106.1363°W
34	Mount Ouray (Note: The summit of Mount Ouray is the highest point of the far southern Sawatch Range.)	Sawatch Range	13,961 ft 4255.4 m	2,659 ft 810 m	13.58 mi 21.9 km	38.4227°N 106.2247°W
35	Crested Butte (Note: The elevation of Crested Butte includes an adjustment of +1.94 m (6.36 ft) from NGVD 29 to NAVD 88.)	Elk Mountains	12,168 ft 3709 m	2,582 ft 787 m	4.65 mi 7.49 km	38.8835°N 106.9436°W
36	Graham Peak	San Juan Mountains	12,536 ft 3821.1 m	2,551 ft 778 m	8.64 mi 13.9 km	37.4972°N 107.3761°W
37	Mount Antero (Note: The summit of Mount Antero is the highest point of the southern Sawatch Range.)	Sawatch Range	14,276 ft 4351.4 m	2,503 ft 763 m	17.75 mi 28.6 km	38.6741°N 106.2462°W
38	East Beckwith Mountain	West Elk Mountains	12,441 ft 3792.1 m	2,492 ft 760 m	6.24 mi 10.05 km	38.8464°N 107.2233°W
39	Chair Mountain	Elk Mountains	12,727 ft 3879.1 m	2,461 ft 750 m	8.89 mi 14.3 km	39.0581°N 107.2822°W
40	Whetstone Mountain	West Elk Mountains	12,527 ft 3818.1 m	2,456 ft 749 m	9.39 mi 15.11 km	38.8223°N 106.9799°W
41	Bison Peak (Note: The summit of Bison Peak is the highest point of the Tarryall Mountains.)	Tarryall Mountains	12,432 ft 3789.4 m	2,451 ft 747 m	18.34 mi 29.5 km	39.2384°N 105.4978°W
42	South River Peak	San Juan Mountains	13,154 ft 4009.4 m	2,448 ft 746 m	21.1 mi 34 km	37.5741°N 106.9815°W
43	Black Mountain (Note: The elevation of Black Mountain includes an adjustment of +1.537 m (5.04 ft) from NGVD 29 to NAVD 88.)	Elkhead Mountains	10,865 ft 3312 m	2,440 ft 744 m	16.4 mi 26.4 km	40.7835°N 107.3691°W
44	Mount Guero	West Elk Mountains	12,058 ft 3675.4 m	2,432 ft 741 m	6.38 mi 10.27 km	38.7196°N 107.3861°W
45	Hagues Peak (Note: The summit of Hagues Peak is the highest point of the Mummy Range.)	Mummy Range	13,573 ft 4137 m	2,420 ft 738 m	15.92 mi 25.6 km	40.4845°N 105.6464°W
46	Antora Peak (Note: The elevation of Antora Peak includes an adjustment of +1.883 m (6.18 ft) from NGVD 29 to NAVD 88.)	Sawatch Range	13,275 ft 4046 m	2,409 ft 734 m	6.75 mi 10.86 km	38.3250°N 106.2180°W
47	Bushnell Peak	Sangre de Cristo Mountains	13,110 ft 3995.8 m	2,405 ft 733 m	11.07 mi 17.82 km	38.3412°N 105.8892°W
48	Zenobia Peak	Uinta Mountains	9,022 ft 2750 m	2,395 ft 730 m	23.7 mi 38.1 km	40.6072°N 108.8701°W
49	East Spanish Peak (Note: East Spanish Peak is the easternmost 3800 meter (12,467.2-foot) summit of the United States.) (Note: The elevation of East Spanish Peak includes an adjustment of +1.372 m (4.5 ft) from NGVD 29 to NAVD 88.)	Spanish Peaks	12,688 ft 3867 m	2,383 ft 726 m	4.21 mi 6.78 km	37.3934°N 104.9201°W
50	Castle Peak (Note: The summit of Castle Peak is the highest point of the Elk Mountains.)	Elk Mountains	14,279 ft 4352.2 m	2,365 ft 721 m	20.9 mi 33.7 km	39.0097°N 106.8614°W
51	Mount Harvard (Note: The summit of Mount Harvard is the highest point of the Collegiate Peaks.)	Sawatch Range	14,421 ft 4395.6 m	2,360 ft 719 m	14.93 mi 24 km	38.9244°N 106.3207°W
52	Sleepy Cat Peak (Note: The elevation of Sleepy Cat Peak includes an adjustment of +1.471 m (4.83 ft) from NGVD 29 to NAVD 88.)	Flat Tops	10,853 ft 3308 m	2,348 ft 716 m	10.64 mi 17.13 km	40.1275°N 107.5338°W
53	Twilight Peak (Note: The summit of Twilight Peak is the highest point of the West Needle Mountains.) (Note: The elevation of Twilight Peak includes an adjustment of +1.537 m (5.04 ft) from NGVD 29 to NAVD 88.)	Needle Mountains	13,163 ft 4012 m	2,338 ft 713 m	4.88 mi 7.86 km	37.6630°N 107.7270°W
54	Maroon Peak	Elk Mountains	14,163 ft 4317 m	2,336 ft 712 m	8.06 mi 12.97 km	39.0708°N 106.9890°W
55	Waugh Mountain (Note: The summit of Waugh Mountain is the highest point of the South Park Hills.) (Note: The elevation of Waugh Mountain includes an adjustment of +1.702 m (5.58 ft) from NGVD 29 to NAVD 88.)	South Park Hills	11,716 ft 3571 m	2,330 ft 710 m	20 mi 32.2 km	38.6022°N 105.6955°W
56	Tomichi Dome (Note: The elevation of Tomichi Dome includes an adjustment of +1.693 m (5.55 ft) from NGVD 29 to NAVD 88.)	Sawatch Range	11,471 ft 3496 m	2,325 ft 709 m	9.35 mi 15.04 km	38.4849°N 106.5291°W
57	Crater Peak (Note: The summit of Crater Peak is the highest point of Grand Mesa.)	Grand Mesa	11,333 ft 3454.2 m	2,307 ft 703 m	17.99 mi 29 km	39.0396°N 107.6628°W
58	Twin Sisters Peaks (Note: The elevation of Twin Sisters Peaks includes an adjustment of +1.388 m (4.55 ft) from NGVD 29 to NAVD 88.)	Front Range	11,433 ft 3485 m	2,298 ft 700 m	4.03 mi 6.48 km	40.2886°N 105.5175°W
59	Mount Silverheels	Front Range	13,829 ft 4215 m	2,283 ft 696 m	5.48 mi 8.82 km	39.3394°N 106.0054°W
60	Lone Cone	San Miguel Mountains	12,618 ft 3846.1 m	2,273 ft 693 m	8.4 mi 13.52 km	37.8880°N 108.2556°W
61	Mount Zwischen (Note: The elevation of Mount Zwischen includes an adjustment of +1.481 m (4.86 ft) from NGVD 29 to NAVD 88.)	Sangre de Cristo Mountains	12,011 ft 3661 m	2,266 ft 691 m	4.44 mi 7.14 km	37.7913°N 105.4554°W
62	Puma Peak (Note: The elevation of Puma Peak includes an adjustment of +1.513 m (4.96 ft) from NGVD 29 to NAVD 88.)	South Park Hills	11,575 ft 3528 m	2,260 ft 689 m	7.11 mi 11.44 km	39.1572°N 105.5815°W
63	Tanks Peak	Uinta Mountains	8,726 ft 2659.6 m	2,247 ft 685 m	13.66 mi 22 km	40.4259°N 108.7660°W
64	Elliott Mountain (Note: The elevation of Elliott Mountain includes an adjustment of +1.709 m (5.61 ft) from NGVD 29 to NAVD 88.)	San Miguel Mountains	12,346 ft 3763 m	2,240 ft 683 m	5.13 mi 8.26 km	37.7344°N 108.0580°W
65	Black Mountain (Note: The elevation of Black Mountain includes an adjustment of +1.631 m (5.35 ft) from NGVD 29 to NAVD 88.)	South Park Hills	11,659 ft 3554 m	2,234 ft 681 m	8.03 mi 12.92 km	38.7185°N 105.6874°W
66	Mount Mestas (Note: The elevation of Mount Mestas includes an adjustment of +1.372 m (4.5 ft) from NGVD 29 to NAVD 88.)	Sangre de Cristo Mountains	11,574 ft 3528 m	2,229 ft 679 m	14.47 mi 23.3 km	37.5830°N 105.1474°W
67	Windom Peak (Note: The summit of Windom Peak is the highest point of the Needle Mountains and La Plata County, Colorado.) (Note: Mount Eolus may be higher than Windom Peak.) (Note: The elevation of Windom Peak includes an adjustment of +1.785 m (5.86 ft) from NGVD 29 to NAVD 88.)	Needle Mountains	14,093 ft 4296 m	2,187 ft 667 m	26.4 mi 42.4 km	37.6212°N 107.5919°W
68	Carbon Peak	West Elk Mountains	12,088 ft 3684.3 m	2,179 ft 664 m	3.92 mi 6.31 km	38.7943°N 107.0431°W
68	Sand Mountain North (Note: The summit of Sand Mountain North is the highest point of the Elkhead Mountains.) (Note: The elevation of Sand Mountain North includes an adjustment of +1.502 m (4.93 ft) from NGVD 29 to NAVD 88.)	Elkhead Mountains	10,884 ft 3317 m	2,179 ft 664 m	18.19 mi 29.3 km	40.7636°N 107.0575°W
70	Mount Princeton	Sawatch Range	14,204 ft 4329.3 m	2,177 ft 664 m	5.19 mi 8.36 km	38.7492°N 106.2424°W
71	Elk Mountain	Rabbit Ears Range	11,424 ft 3482.1 m	2,159 ft 658 m	10.52 mi 16.93 km	40.1619°N 106.1285°W
72	Anthracite Range High Point	West Elk Mountains	12,394 ft 3777.8 m	2,125 ft 648 m	4.77 mi 7.68 km	38.8145°N 107.1445°W
73	Mount of the Holy Cross (Note: The summit of Mount of the Holy Cross is the highest point of the northern Sawatch Range.) (Note: The summit elevation of Mount of the Holy Cross includes a vertical offset of +0.61 m (2 ft) from the station benchmark.)	Sawatch Range	14,011 ft 4270.5 m	2,113 ft 644 m	18.52 mi 29.8 km	39.4668°N 106.4817°W
74	Vermilion Peak (Note: The elevation of Vermilion Peak includes an adjustment of +1.827 m (5.99 ft) from NGVD 29 to NAVD 88.)	San Juan Mountains	13,900 ft 4237 m	2,105 ft 642 m	9.07 mi 14.6 km	37.7993°N 107.8285°W
75	Bald Mountain (Note: The elevation of Bald Mountain includes an adjustment of +1.922 m (6.31 ft) from NGVD 29 to NAVD 88.)	Front Range	13,690 ft 4173 m	2,099 ft 640 m	7.51 mi 12.09 km	39.4448°N 105.9705°W
76	Thirtynine Mile Mountain (Note: The elevation of Thirtynine Mile Mountain includes an adjustment of +1.584 m (5.2 ft) from NGVD 29 to NAVD 88.)	South Park Hills	11,553 ft 3521 m	2,088 ft 636 m	10.61 mi 17.08 km	38.8324°N 105.5553°W
77	Jacque Peak (Note: The elevation of Jacque Peak includes an adjustment of +1.866 m (6.12 ft) from NGVD 29 to NAVD 88.)	Gore Range	13,211 ft 4027 m	2,065 ft 629 m	4.52 mi 7.28 km	39.4549°N 106.1970°W
78	Williams Peak	Front Range	11,620 ft 3541.8 m	2,049 ft 625 m	8.66 mi 13.93 km	39.8552°N 106.1854°W
79	Mount Herard (Note: The elevation of Mount Herard includes an adjustment of +1.64 m (5.38 ft) from NGVD 29 to NAVD 88.)	Sangre de Cristo Mountains	13,345 ft 4068 m	2,040 ft 622 m	4.63 mi 7.45 km	37.8492°N 105.4949°W
79	Park Cone (Note: The elevation of Park Cone includes an adjustment of +1.873 m (6.15 ft) from NGVD 29 to NAVD 88.)	Sawatch Range	12,106 ft 3690 m	2,040 ft 622 m	3.44 mi 5.53 km	38.7967°N 106.6028°W
81	Red Table Mountain	Sawatch Range	12,043 ft 3670.7 m	2,017 ft 615 m	7.88 mi 12.68 km	39.4181°N 106.7712°W
82	West Buffalo Peak (Note: The elevation of West Buffalo Peak includes an adjustment of +1.834 m (6.02 ft) from NGVD 29 to NAVD 88.)	Mosquito Range	13,332 ft 4064 m	1,986 ft 605 m	9.61 mi 15.46 km	38.9917°N 106.1249°W
83	Chalk Benchmark	San Juan Mountains	12,038 ft 3669.3 m	1,971 ft 601 m	7.26 mi 11.68 km	37.1418°N 106.7500°W
84	Mount Massive (Note: Mount Massive is the second highest summit of the Rocky Mountains.) (Note: The elevation of Mount Massive includes an adjustment of +2.087 m (6.85 ft) from NGVD 29 to NAVD 88.)	Sawatch Range	14,428 ft 4398 m	1,961 ft 598 m	5.06 mi 8.14 km	39.1875°N 106.4757°W
85	Middle Peak (Note: Dolores Peak may be higher than Middle Peak.) (Note: The elevation of Middle Peak includes an adjustment of +1.809 m (5.94 ft) from NGVD 29 to NAVD 88.)	San Miguel Mountains	13,306 ft 4056 m	1,960 ft 597 m	4.78 mi 7.69 km	37.8536°N 108.1082°W
86	Iron Mountain (Note: The elevation of Iron Mountain includes an adjustment of +1.436 m (4.71 ft) from NGVD 29 to NAVD 88.)	Sangre de Cristo Range	11,416 ft 3480 m	1,951 ft 595 m	6.95 mi 11.18 km	37.6375°N 105.2538°W
87	Grizzly Peak	Sawatch Range	13,995 ft 4265.6 m	1,928 ft 588 m	6.77 mi 10.89 km	39.0425°N 106.5976°W
88	Sawtooth Mountain	La Garita Mountains	12,153 ft 3704.2 m	1,927 ft 587 m	16.73 mi 26.9 km	38.2740°N 106.8670°W
89	Columbus Mountain (Note: The elevation of Columbus Mountain includes an adjustment of +1.378 m (4.52 ft) from NGVD 29 to NAVD 88.)	Elkhead Mountains	10,258 ft 3126 m	1,913 ft 583 m	7.68 mi 12.36 km	40.8799°N 107.1921°W
90	Conejos Peak	San Juan Mountains	13,179 ft 4017 m	1,912 ft 583 m	8.15 mi 13.12 km	37.2887°N 106.5709°W
91	Handies Peak	San Juan Mountains	14,058 ft 4284.8 m	1,908 ft 582 m	11.18 mi 18 km	37.9130°N 107.5044°W
92	Mount Yale	Sawatch Range	14,200 ft 4328.2 m	1,896 ft 578 m	5.55 mi 8.93 km	38.8442°N 106.3138°W
93	Horse Mountain (Note: The elevation of Horse Mountain includes an adjustment of +1.461 m (4.79 ft) from NGVD 29 to NAVD 88.)	San Juan Mountains	9,952 ft 3033 m	1,887 ft 575 m	13.06 mi 21 km	37.3080°N 107.2864°W
94	Rio Grande Pyramid	San Juan Mountains	13,827 ft 4214.4 m	1,881 ft 573 m	10.76 mi 17.31 km	37.6797°N 107.3924°W
95	Laramie Mountains High Point (Note: The elevation of Laramie Mountains High Point includes an adjustment of +1.415 m (4.64 ft) from NGVD 29 to NAVD 88.)	Laramie Mountains	11,025 ft 3360 m	1,880 ft 573 m	8.54 mi 13.74 km	40.7704°N 105.7162°W
96	Sultan Mountain (Note: The elevation of Sultan Mountain includes an adjustment of +1.649 m (5.41 ft) from NGVD 29 to NAVD 88.)	San Juan Mountains	13,373 ft 4076 m	1,868 ft 569 m	4.59 mi 7.39 km	37.7859°N 107.7038°W
97	Green Mountain	Kenosha Mountains	10,427 ft 3178.3 m	1,859 ft 567 m	4.18 mi 6.72 km	39.3053°N 105.3001°W
98	Fishers Peak (Note: The summit of Fishers Peak is the highest point of Raton Mesa. Fishers Peak is the easternmost summit of its elevation in the United States.)	Raton Mesa	9,633 ft 2936.2 m	1,847 ft 563 m	32.4 mi 52.2 km	37.0982°N 104.4628°W
99	Little Cone	San Miguel Mountains	11,988 ft 3654 m	1,840 ft 561 m	5.19 mi 8.35 km	37.9275°N 108.0908°W
100	La Plata Peak (Note: The elevation of La Plata Peak includes an adjustment of +1.983 m (6.51 ft) from NGVD 29 to NAVD 88.)	Sawatch Range	14,343 ft 4372 m	1,836 ft 560 m	6.28 mi 10.11 km	39.0294°N 106.4729°W

== Gallery ==
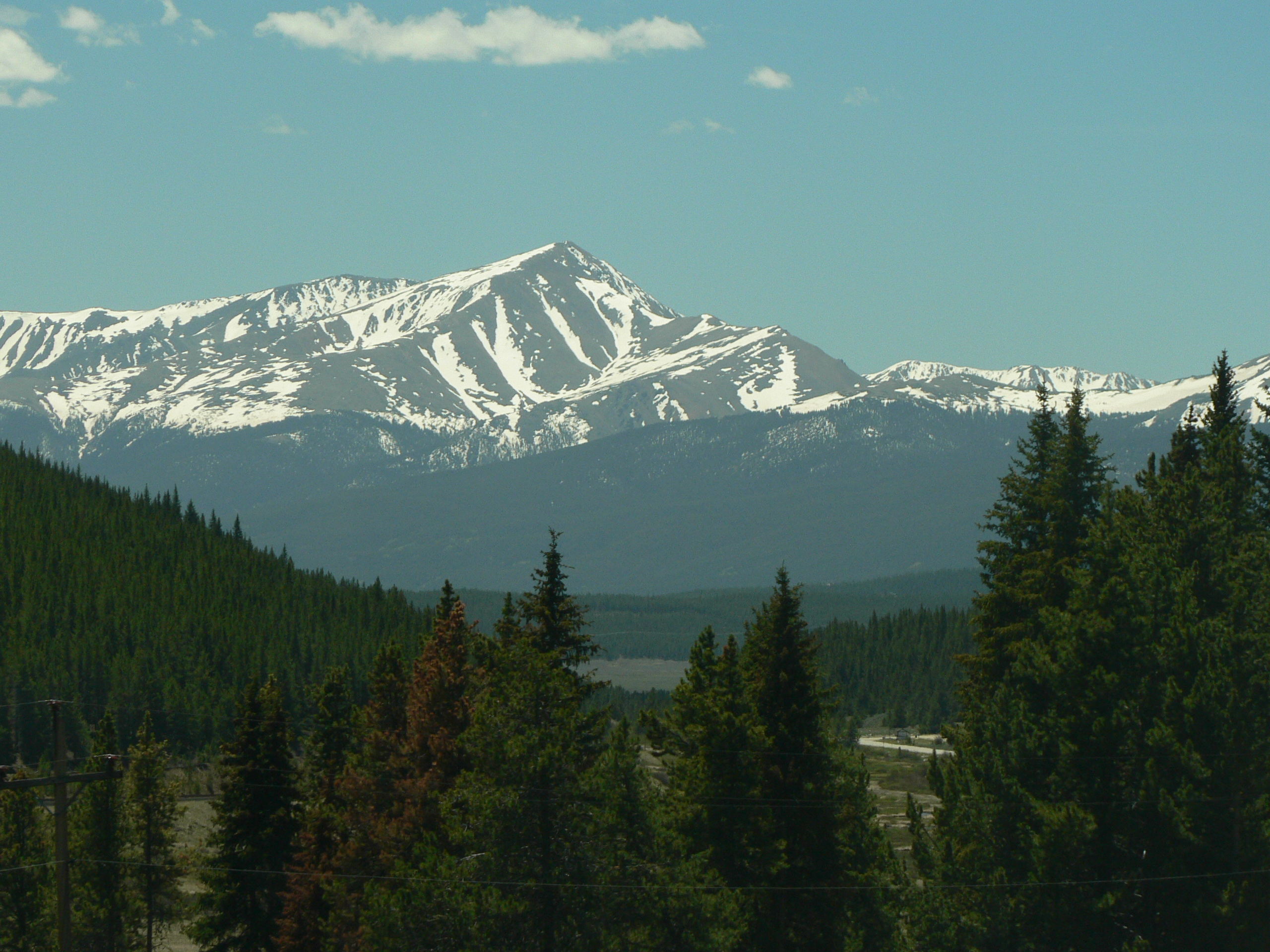
1. Mount Elbert in the Sawatch Range is the highest peak of the Rocky Mountains.

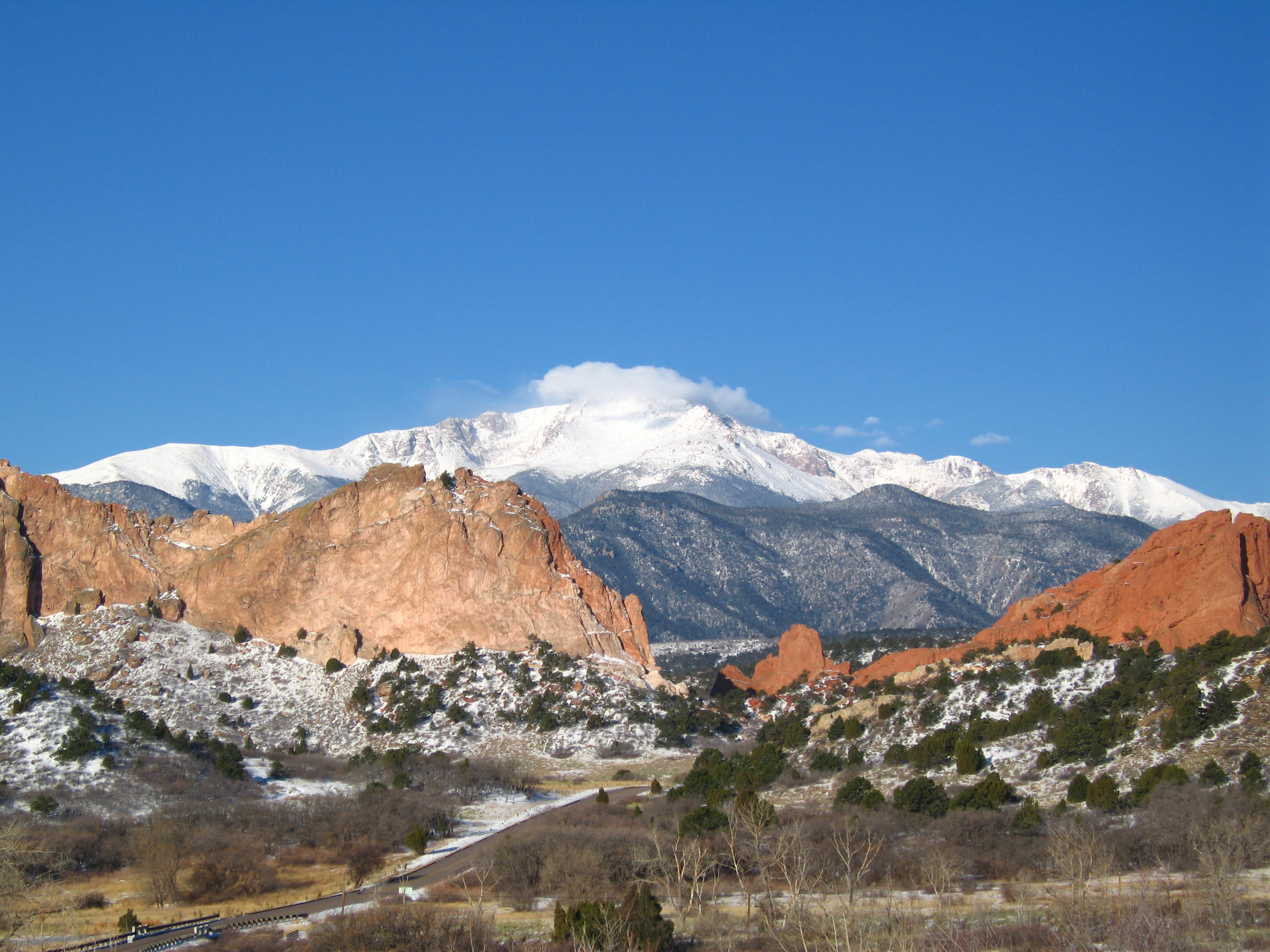
2. Pikes Peak is the second most topographically prominent mountain peak of Colorado.

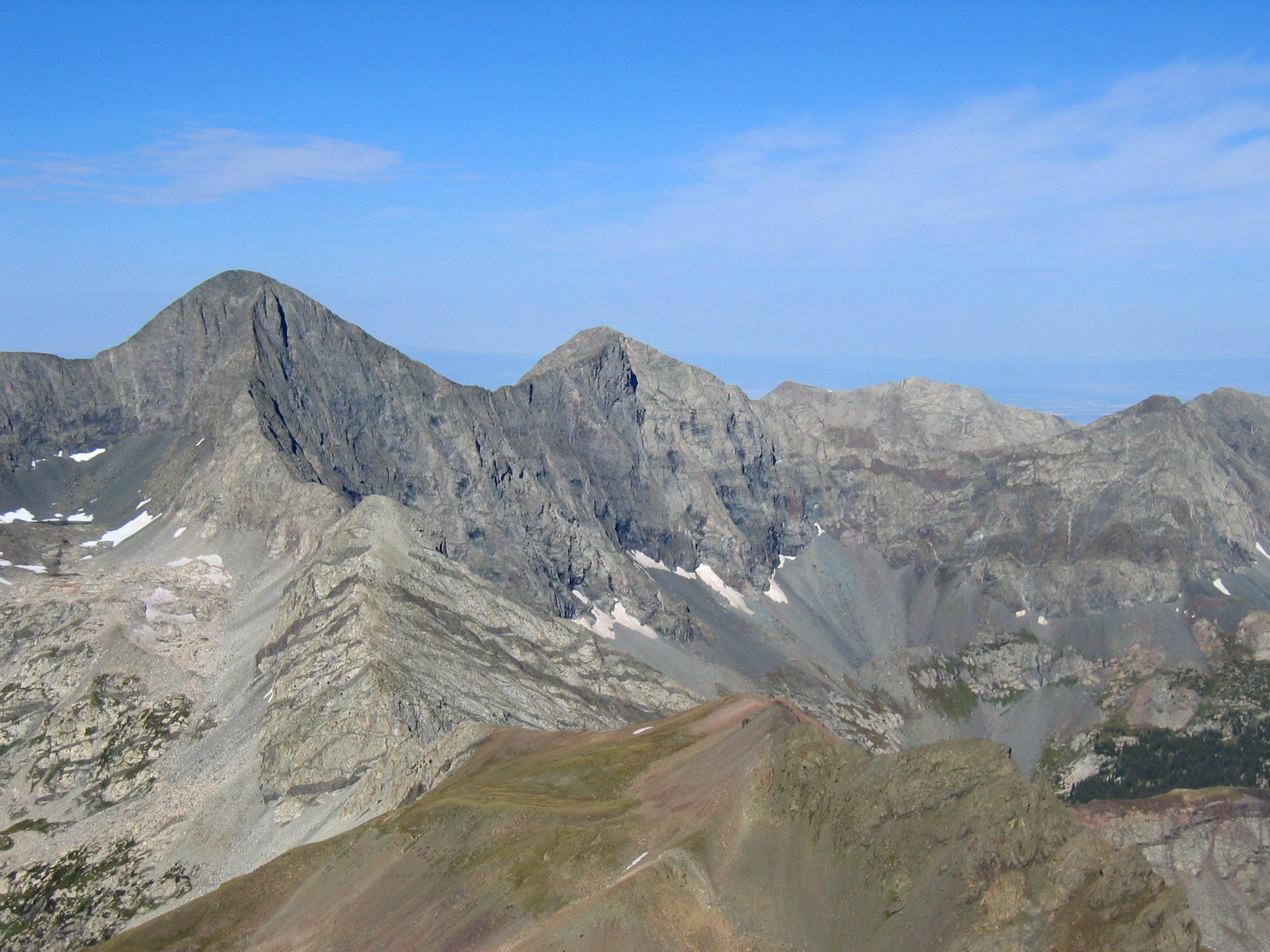
3. Blanca Peak is the highest peak of the Sangre de Cristo Mountains and the second most topographically isolated peak of Colorado.

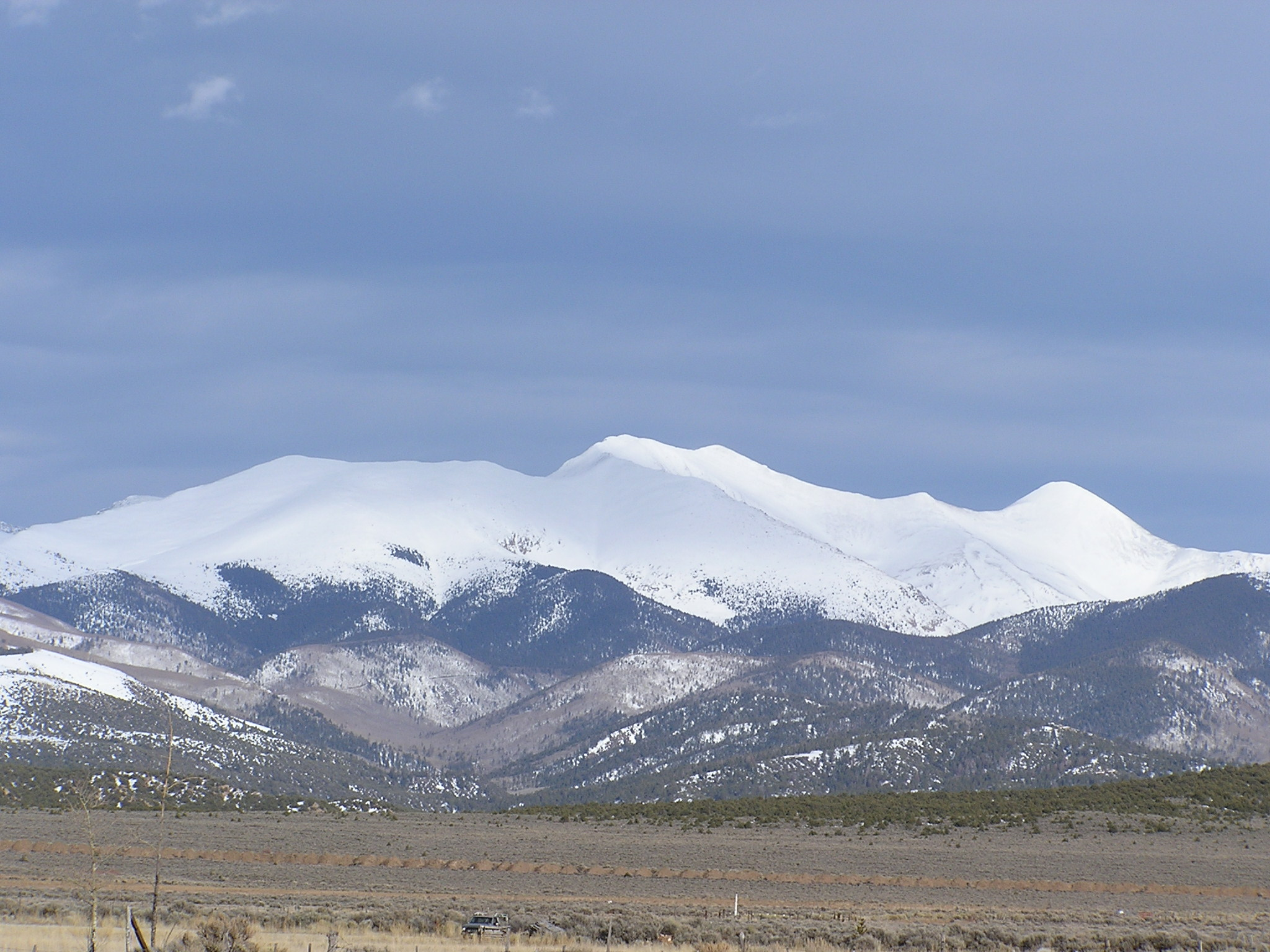
4. Culebra Peak is the southernmost 14,000-foot summit of the Rocky Mountains.

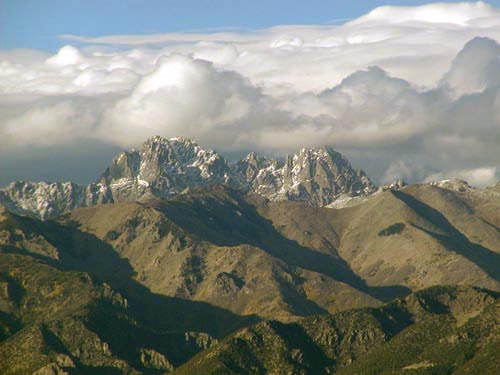
5. Crestone Peak is the highest peak of the Crestones and the seventh highest peak of the Rocky Mountains.

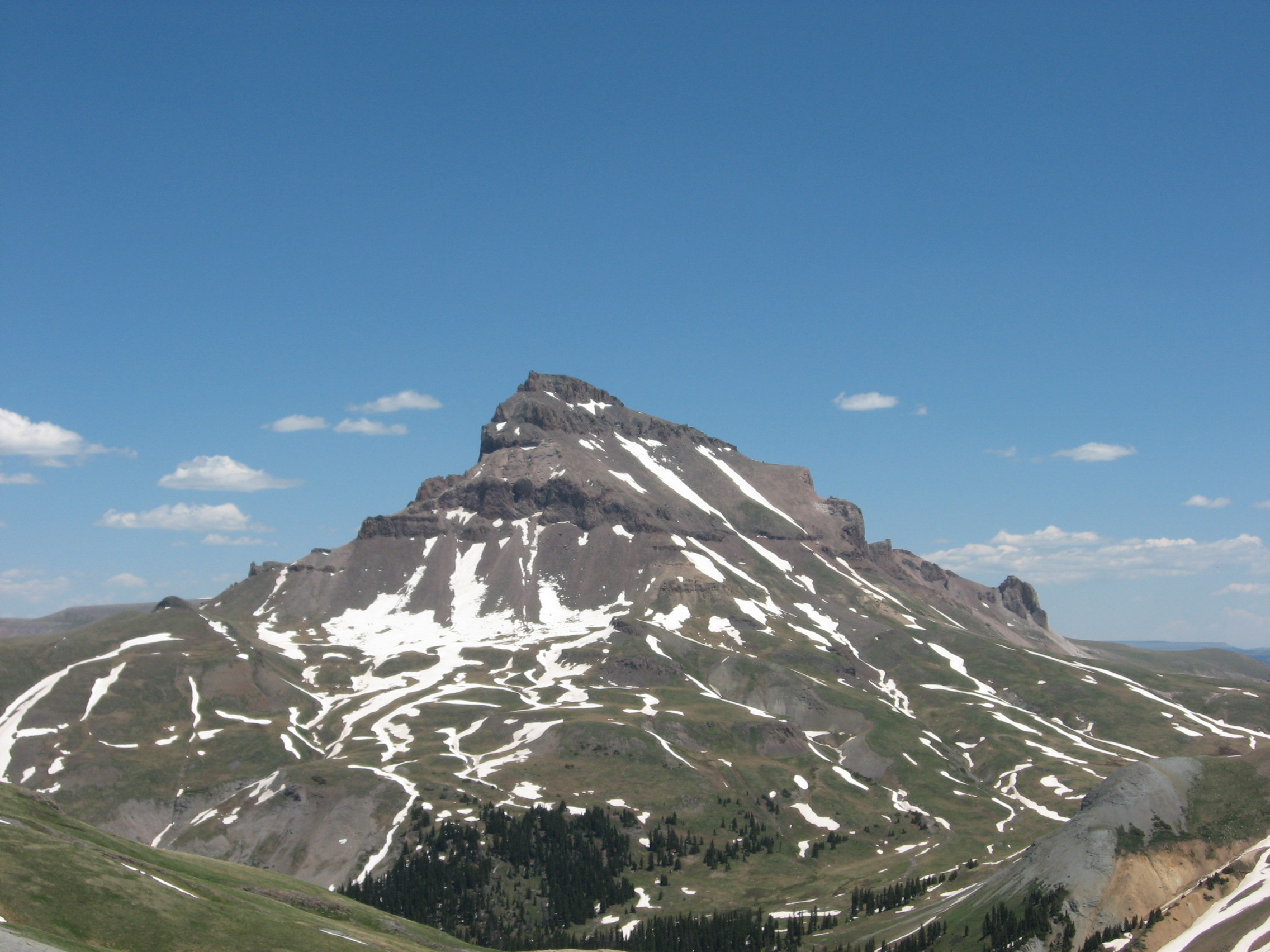
6. Uncompahgre Peak is the highest peak of the San Juan Mountains and the sixth highest peak of the Rocky Mountains.

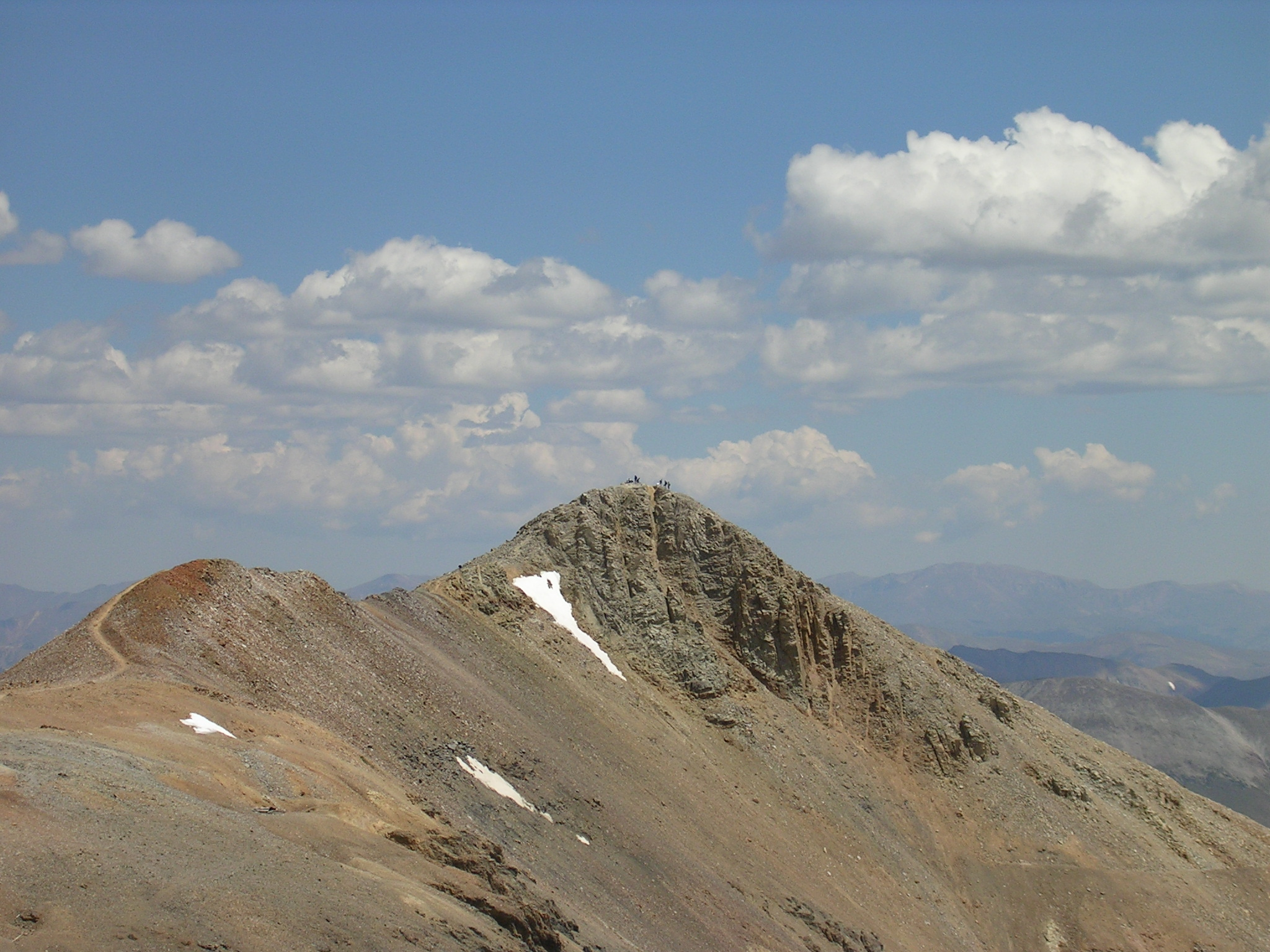
10. Mount Lincoln is the highest peak of the Mosquito Range and the eighth highest peak of the Rocky Mountains.

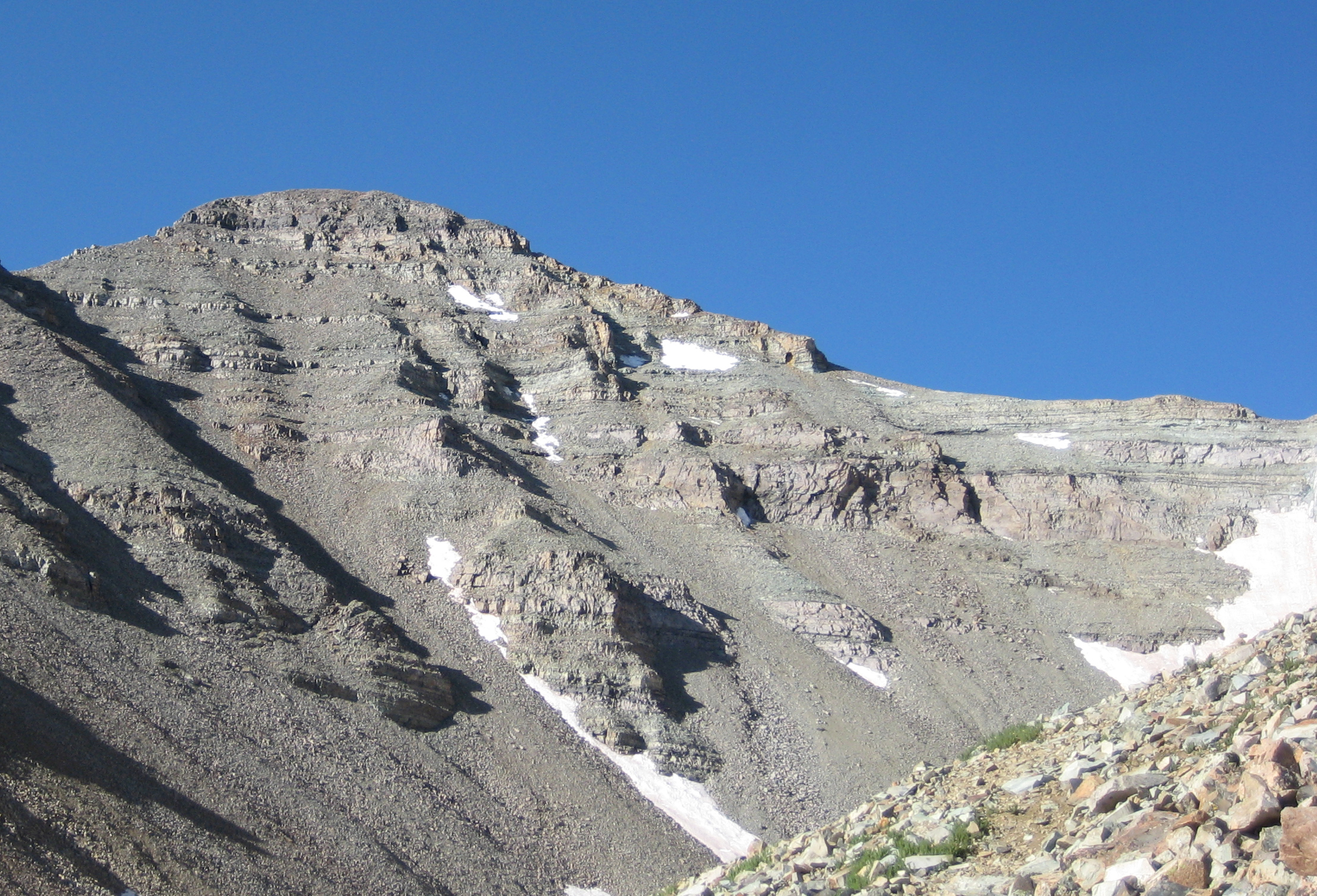
20. Castle Peak is the highest peak of the Elk Mountains and the ninth highest peak of the Rocky Mountains.

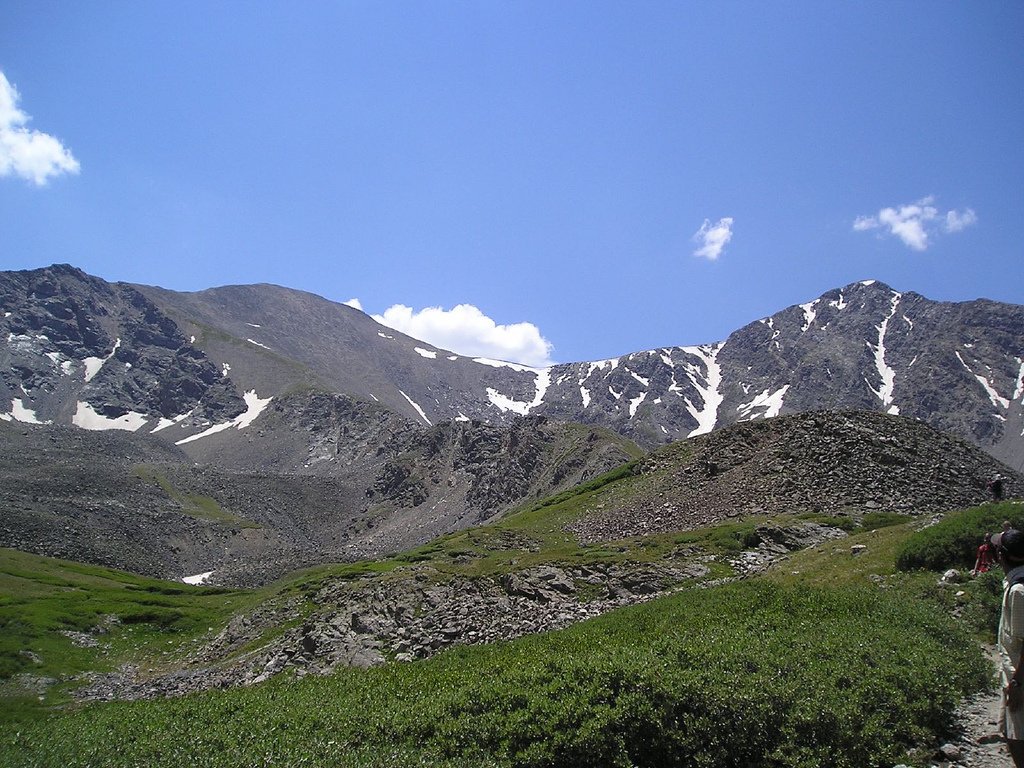
27. Grays Peak is the highest peak of the Front Range and the tenth highest peak of the Rocky Mountains.

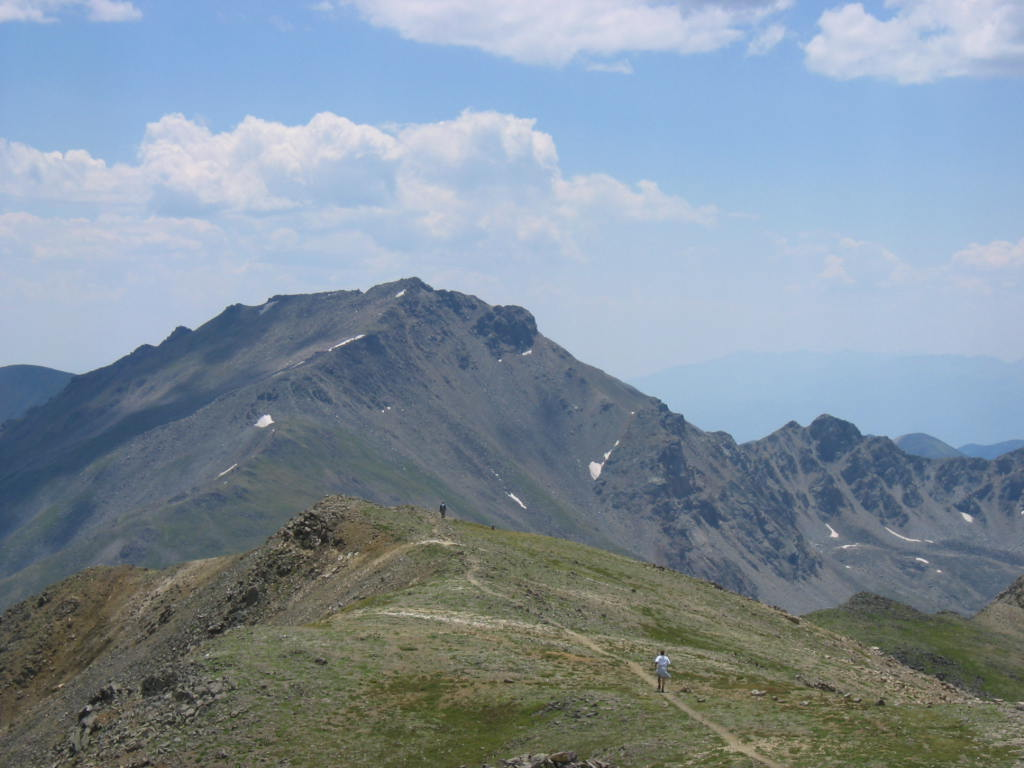
51. Mount Harvard is the highest of the Collegiate Peaks and the third highest peak of the Rocky Mountains.

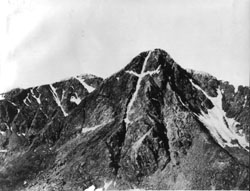
72. This photograph of the legendary Mount of the Holy Cross was taken by William Henry Jackson in 1874.

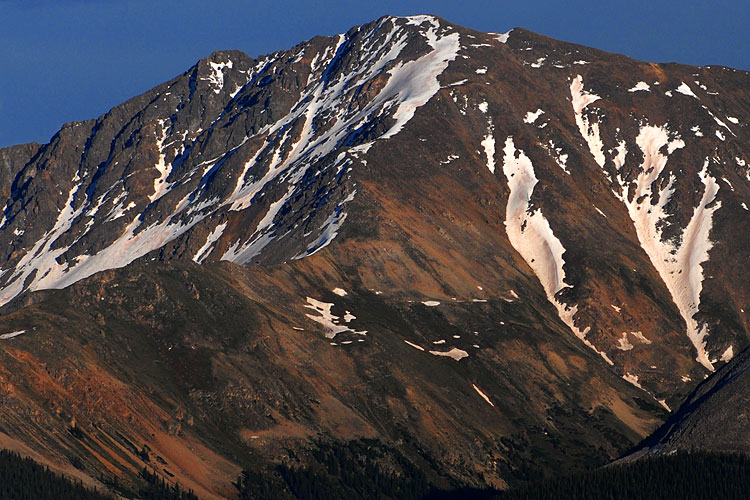
99. La Plata Peak in the Collegiate Peaks is the fifth highest peak of the Rocky Mountains.

== See also ==
- List of mountain peaks of North America
  - List of mountain peaks of Greenland
  - List of mountain peaks of Canada
  - List of mountain peaks of the Rocky Mountains
  - List of mountain peaks of the United States
    - List of mountain peaks of Alaska
    - List of mountain peaks of California
    - List of mountain peaks of Colorado
      - List of the highest major summits of Colorado
        - List of the major 4000-meter summits of Colorado
          - List of Colorado fourteeners
      - List of the most prominent summits of Colorado
      - List of mountain ranges of Colorado
    - List of mountain peaks of Hawaiʻi
  - List of mountain peaks of México
  - List of mountain peaks of Central America
  - List of mountain peaks of the Caribbean
- Colorado
  - Geography of Colorado
    - Category:Mountains of Colorado
      - commons:Category:Mountains of Colorado
- Physical geography
  - Topography
    - Topographic elevation
    - Topographic prominence
    - Topographic isolation
