= List of the highest major summits of North America =

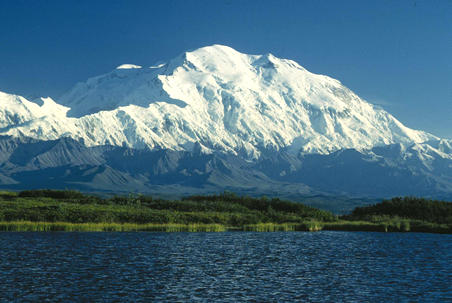
Denali in Alaska is the highest mountain peak of North America. Federally designated as Mount McKinley, it is the third most topographically prominent and third most topographically isolated summit on Earth after Mount Everest and Aconcagua.

The following sortable table comprises the 403 mountain peaks of greater North America with at least 3000 meters (9843 feet) of elevation and at least 500 meters (1640 feet) of topographic prominence.

The summit of a mountain or hill may be measured in three principal ways:

1. The topographic elevation of a summit measures the height of the summit above a geodetic sea level.
2. The topographic prominence of a summit is a measure of how high the summit rises above its surroundings.
3. The topographic isolation (or radius of dominance) of a summit measures how far the summit lies from its nearest point of equal elevation.

In greater North America, only Denali exceeds 6000 meters (19,685 feet) elevation. Three major summits exceed 5500 meters (18,045 feet), 11 exceed 5000 meters (16,404 feet), 21 exceed 4500 meters (14,764 feet), 124 exceed 4000 meters (13,123 feet), 277 exceed 3500 meters (11,483 feet), and the following 403 major summits exceed 3000 meters (9843 feet) elevation.

== Major 3000-meter summits ==
Of the 403 major 3000-meter summits of greater North America, 299 are located in the United States (excluding three in Hawaiʻi), 67 in Canada, 30 in México, and eight in Guatemala, four in Greenland, two in Costa Rica, and one in both Panamá and the Dominican Republic. Eight of these peaks lie on the Canada-United States border and one lies on the México-Guatemala border. Additional references and maps for the 200 highest of these major summits can be found on the List of the highest major summits of North America.

The 403 summits of greater North America with at least 3000 meters of topographic elevation and 500 meters of topographic prominence
| Rank | Mountain peak | Region | Mountain range | Elevation | Prominence | Isolation | Location |
|---|---|---|---|---|---|---|---|
| 1 | Denali (Note: The summit of Denali is the highest point of the Alaska Range, the State of Alaska, the United States of America, and greater North America. Federally designated as Mount McKinley, it is the third most topographically prominent and third most topographically isolated summit on Earth after Mount Everest and Aconcagua.) (Mount McKinley) | Alaska | Alaska Range | 6190.5 m 20,310 ft | 6141 m 20,146 ft | 7,436 km 4,621 mi | 63.0690°N 151.0063°W |
| 2 | Mount Logan (Note: The summit of Mount Logan is the highest point of the Saint Elias Mountains, Yukon, and all of Canada.) | Yukon | Saint Elias Mountains | 5959 m 19,551 ft | 5247 m 17,215 ft | 623 km 387 mi | 60.5671°N 140.4055°W |
| 3 | Pico de Orizaba (Note: The summit of Pico de Orizaba is the highest point of Estado Libre y Soberano de Puebla, Estado Libre y Soberano de Veracruz de Ignacio de la Llave, and all of México.) (Citlaltépetl) | Puebla; Veracruz | Cordillera Neovolcanica | 5636 m 18,491 ft | 4922 m 16,148 ft | 2,690 km 1,672 mi | 19.0305°N 97.2698°W |
| 4 | Mount Saint Elias (Note: Mount Saint Elias is the second highest major summit of both Canada and the United States.) | Alaska; Yukon | Saint Elias Mountains | 5489 m 18,009 ft | 3429 m 11,250 ft | 41.3 km 25.6 mi | 60.2927°N 140.9307°W |
| 5 | Volcán Popocatépetl (Note: Volcán Popocatépetl on the border of Puebla is the highest point of both Estado Libre y Soberano de México and Estado Libre y Soberano de Morelos.) (Note: Popocatépetl is the southernmost 5000-meter (16,404-foot) summit of México and greater North America.) | México; Morelos; Puebla | Cordillera Neovolcanica | 5413 m 17,759 ft | 3043 m 9,984 ft | 142.6 km 88.6 mi | 19.0225°N 98.6280°W |
| 6 | Mount Foraker (Note: Mount Foraker is the westernmost 5000-meter (16,404-foot) summit of Alaska, the United States, and greater North America.) | Alaska | Alaska Range | 5304 m 17,400 ft | 2210 m 7,250 ft | 23 km 14.27 mi | 62.9604°N 151.3998°W |
| 7 | Mount Lucania (Note: The summit of Mount Lucania is the highest point of the northern Saint Elias Mountains.) (Note: Mount Lucania is the northernmost summit of its elevation in Canada.) | Yukon | Saint Elias Mountains | 5260 m 17,257 ft | 3080 m 10,105 ft | 43 km 26.7 mi | 61.0215°N 140.4661°W |
| 8 | Volcán Iztaccíhuatl (Note: Volcán Iztaccíhuatl is the northernmost and westernmost 5000-meter (16,404-foot) summit of México.) | México; Puebla | Cordillera Neovolcanica | 5213 m 17,103 ft | 1530 m 5,020 ft | 17.16 km 10.66 mi | 19.1801°N 98.6416°W |
| 9 | King Peak | Yukon | Saint Elias Mountains | 5173 m 16,972 ft | 1073 m 3,520 ft | 4.68 km 2.91 mi | 60.5833°N 140.6549°W |
| 10 | Mount Bona (Note: The summit of Mount Bona is the highest point of the northwest Saint Elias Mountains. Some maps show an elevation of 16,421 feet (5,005 m), and others indicate 16,550±50 feet (5045±15 meters). Mount Bona may or may not be higher than Mount Steele, whose exact elevation is also uncertain.) | Alaska | Saint Elias Mountains | 5044 m 16,550 ft | 2103 m 6,900 ft | 80 km 49.7 mi | 61.3856°N 141.7495°W |
| 11 | Mount Steele (Note: Mount Steele is the northernmost and easternmost 5000-meter (16,404-foot) summit of Canada. Older maps show an elevation of 5,073 metres (16,644 ft), but more recent maps indicate 5,020±20 metres (about 16,470±60 ft). Mount Steele may or may not be higher than Mount Bona, whose exact elevation is also uncertain.) | Yukon | Saint Elias Mountains | 5020 m 16,470 ft | 760 m 2,493 ft | 9.45 km 5.87 mi | 61.0929°N 140.3118°W |
| 12 | Mount Blackburn (Note: The summit of Mount Blackburn is the highest point of the Wrangell Mountains.) | Alaska | Wrangell Mountains | 4996 m 16,390 ft | 3548 m 11,640 ft | 97.6 km 60.7 mi | 61.7305°N 143.4031°W |
| 13 | Mount Sanford | Alaska | Wrangell Mountains | 4949 m 16,237 ft | 2343 m 7,687 ft | 64.8 km 40.3 mi | 62.2132°N 144.1292°W |
| 14 | Mount Wood (Note: Mount Wood is the northernmost summit of its elevation in Canada.) | Yukon | Saint Elias Mountains | 4860 m 15,945 ft | 1200 m 3,937 ft | 18.95 km 11.77 mi | 61.2326°N 140.5123°W |
| 15 | Mount Vancouver (Note: Mount Vancouver is the easternmost summit of its elevation in Canada.) | Yukon | Saint Elias Mountains | 4812 m 15,787 ft | 2712 m 8,898 ft | 44 km 27.4 mi | 60.3589°N 139.6980°W |
| 16 | Mount Slaggard | Yukon | Saint Elias Mountains | 4742 m 15,558 ft | 522 m 1,713 ft | 7.74 km 4.81 mi | 61.1727°N 140.5851°W |
| 17 | Nevado de Toluca (Note: Nevado de Toluca is the westernmost summit of its elevation in México.) (Xinantécatl) | México | Cordillera Neovolcanica | 4690 m 15,387 ft | 2225 m 7,300 ft | 117.7 km 73.1 mi | 19.1020°N 99.7677°W |
| 18 | Mount Fairweather (Note: Mount Fairweather lies on the international border between Alaska and British Columbia. The peak is the highest point of the Canadian Province of British Columbia and the southernmost and easternmost summit of its elevation in both Canada and the United States.) (Fairweather Mountain) | Alaska; British Columbia | Saint Elias Mountains | 4671 m 15,325 ft | 3961 m 12,995 ft | 200 km 124.4 mi | 58.9064°N 137.5265°W |
| 19 | Sierra Negra (Note: Sierra Negra is the southernmost and easternmost summit of its elevation in Mexico.) (Tliltépetl) | Puebla | Cordillera Neovolcanica | 4590 m 15,059 ft | 520 m 1,706 ft | 4.58 km 2.85 mi | 18.9859°N 97.3140°W |
| 20 | Mount Hubbard | Alaska; Yukon | Saint Elias Mountains | 4557 m 14,951 ft | 2457 m 8,061 ft | 34.4 km 21.3 mi | 60.3194°N 139.0726°W |
| 21 | Mount Bear | Alaska | Saint Elias Mountains | 4520 m 14,831 ft | 1540 m 5,054 ft | 32.4 km 20.1 mi | 61.2834°N 141.1433°W |
| 22 | Mount Walsh | Yukon | Saint Elias Mountains | 4506 m 14,783 ft | 1366 m 4,482 ft | 18.76 km 11.66 mi | 61.0037°N 140.0171°W |
| 23 | Mount Hunter | Alaska | Alaska Range | 4442 m 14,573 ft | 1418 m 4,653 ft | 11.07 km 6.88 mi | 62.9504°N 151.0915°W |
| 24 | Volcán La Malinche (Note: Volcán La Malinche on the border of Puebla is the highest point of Estado Libre y Soberano de Tlaxcala.) (Note: La Malinche is the northernmost summit of its elevation in México.) (Matlalcuéyetl) | Puebla; Tlaxcala | Cordillera Neovolcanica | 4438 m 14,560 ft | 1928 m 6,325 ft | 62.5 km 38.8 mi | 19.2310°N 98.0320°W |
| 25 | Mount Whitney (Note: The summit of Mount Whitney is the highest point of the Sierra Nevada, the State of California, and the contiguous United States.) (Note: Mount Whitney is the southernmost and easternmost summit of its elevation in United States.) | California | Sierra Nevada | 4421 m 14,505 ft | 3072 m 10,080 ft | 2,649 km 1,646 mi | 36.5786°N 118.2920°W |
| 26 | Mount Alverstone (Boundary Point 180) | Alaska; Yukon | Saint Elias Mountains | 4420 m 14,500 ft | 594 m 1,950 ft | 3.62 km 2.25 mi | 60.3518°N 139.0749°W |
| 27 | University Peak | Alaska | Saint Elias Mountains | 4410 m 14,470 ft | 978 m 3,210 ft | 5.97 km 3.71 mi | 61.3272°N 141.7867°W |
| 28 | Mount Elbert (Note: The summit of Mount Elbert is the highest point of the U.S. State of Colorado, the Rocky Mountains of North America, and the entire Mississippi River drainage basin.) | Colorado | Sawatch Range | 4401.2 m 14,440 ft | 2772 m 9,093 ft | 1,079 km 671 mi | 39.1178°N 106.4454°W |
| 29 | Mount Massive (Note: Mount Massive is the second highest major summit of the Rocky Mountains.) (Note: The elevation of Mount Massive includes an adjustment of +2.087 m (6.85 ft) from NGVD 29 to NAVD 88.) | Colorado | Sawatch Range | 4398 m 14,428 ft | 598 m 1,961 ft | 8.14 km 5.06 mi | 39.1875°N 106.4757°W |
| 30 | Mount Harvard (Note: The summit of Mount Harvard is the highest point of the Collegiate Peaks.) (Note: Mount Harvard is the southernmost and easternmost summit of its elevation in the Rocky Mountains.) | Colorado | Sawatch Range | 4395.6 m 14,421 ft | 719 m 2,360 ft | 24 km 14.92 mi | 38.9244°N 106.3207°W |
| 31 | Mount Rainier (Note: The summit of Mount Rainier is the highest point of the Cascade Range and the U.S. State of Washington. Mount Rainier is the most prominent summit in the contiguous United States and the fourth most prominent in North America.) (Note: The elevation of Mount Rainier includes an adjustment of +1.914 m (6.28 ft) from NGVD 29 to NAVD 88.) | Washington | Cascade Range | 4394 m 14,417 ft | 4026 m 13,210 ft | 1,177 km 731 mi | 46.8529°N 121.7604°W |
| 32 | Mount Williamson (Note: The elevation of Mount Williamson includes an adjustment of +1.807 m (5.93 ft) from NGVD 29 to NAVD 88.) | California | Sierra Nevada | 4383 m 14,379 ft | 511 m 1,676 ft | 8.7 km 5.41 mi | 36.6559°N 118.3111°W |
| 33 | McArthur Peak | Yukon | Saint Elias Mountains | 4380 m 14,370 ft | 960 m 3,150 ft | 9.1 km 5.65 mi | 60.6069°N 140.2144°W |
| 34 | Blanca Peak (Note: The summit of Blanca Peak is the highest point of the Sangre de Cristo Mountains and the entire Rio Grande drainage basin.) (Note: Blanca Peak is the southernmost ultra-prominent summit of the Rocky Mountains.) (Note: The elevation of Blanca Peak includes an adjustment of +1.755 m (5.76 ft) from NGVD 29 to NAVD 88.) | Colorado | Sangre de Cristo Mountains | 4374 m 14,351 ft | 1623 m 5,326 ft | 166.4 km 103.4 mi | 37.5775°N 105.4856°W |
| 35 | La Plata Peak (Note: The elevation of La Plata Peak includes an adjustment of +1.983 m (6.51 ft) from NGVD 29 to NAVD 88.) | Colorado | Sawatch Range | 4372 m 14,343 ft | 560 m 1,836 ft | 10.11 km 6.28 mi | 39.0294°N 106.4729°W |
| 36 | Uncompahgre Peak (Note: The summit of Uncompahgre Peak is the highest point of the San Juan Mountains and the entire Gulf of California drainage basin.) (Note: Uncompahgre Peak is the westernmost summit of its elevation in the Rocky Mountains.) | Colorado | San Juan Mountains | 4365 m 14,321 ft | 1304 m 4,277 ft | 136.8 km 85 mi | 38.0717°N 107.4621°W |
| 37 | Crestone Peak (Note: The summit of Crestone Peak is the highest point of the Crestones.) (Note: The elevation of Crestone Peak includes an adjustment of +1.76 m (5.77 ft) from NGVD 29 to NAVD 88.) | Colorado | Sangre de Cristo Range | 4359 m 14,300 ft | 1388 m 4,554 ft | 44 km 27.4 mi | 37.9669°N 105.5855°W |
| 38 | Mount Lincoln (Note: The summit of Mount Lincoln is the highest point of the Mosquito Range and the entire Missouri River drainage basin.) (Note: Mount Lincoln is the northernmost summit of its elevation in the Rocky Mountains.) | Colorado | Mosquito Range | 4356.5 m 14,293 ft | 1177 m 3,862 ft | 36.2 km 22.5 mi | 39.3515°N 106.1116°W |
| 39 | Castle Peak (Note: The summit of Castle Peak is the highest point of the Elk Mountains.) | Colorado | Elk Mountains | 4352.2 m 14,279 ft | 721 m 2,365 ft | 33.6 km 20.9 mi | 39.0097°N 106.8614°W |
| 40 | Grays Peak (Note: The summit of Grays Peak is the highest point of the Front Range and the Continental Divide in North America.) (Note: Grays Peak is the northernmost summit of its elevation in the Rocky Mountains.) | Colorado | Front Range | 4352 m 14,278 ft | 844 m 2,770 ft | 40.2 km 25 mi | 39.6339°N 105.8176°W |
| 41 | Mount Antero (Note: The summit of Mount Antero is the highest point of the southern Sawatch Range.) | Colorado | Sawatch Range | 4351.4 m 14,276 ft | 763 m 2,503 ft | 28.4 km 17.67 mi | 38.6741°N 106.2462°W |
| 42 | Mount Blue Sky (Note: The summit elevation of Mount Blue Sky includes a vertical offset of +1.798 m (5.9 ft) from the station benchmark.) | Colorado | Front Range | 4350 m 14,271 ft | 844 m 2,770 ft | 15.76 km 9.79 mi | 39.5883°N 105.6438°W |
| 43 | Longs Peak (Note: The summit of Longs Peak is the highest point of the northern Front Range.) (Note: Longs Peak is the northernmost 14,000-foot (4267-meter) summit of the Rocky Mountains.) | Colorado | Front Range | 4346 m 14,259 ft | 896 m 2,940 ft | 70.2 km 43.6 mi | 40.2550°N 105.6151°W |
| 44 | Mount Wilson (Note: The summit of Mount Wilson is the highest point of the San Miguel Mountains.) (Note: Mount Wilson is the westernmost summit of its elevation in the Rocky Mountains.) (Note: The elevation of Mount Wilson includes an adjustment of +1.899 m (6.23 ft) from NGVD 29 to NAVD 88.) | Colorado | San Miguel Mountains | 4344 m 14,252 ft | 1227 m 4,024 ft | 53.1 km 33 mi | 37.8391°N 107.9916°W |
| 45 | White Mountain Peak (Note: The summit of White Mountain Peak is the highest point of the White Mountains.) | California | White Mountains | 4344 m 14,252 ft | 2193 m 7,196 ft | 108.6 km 67.4 mi | 37.6341°N 118.2557°W |
| 46 | North Palisade (Note: The summit of North Palisade is the highest point of the Palisades.) (Note: The elevation of North Palisade includes an adjustment of +1.867 m (6.13 ft) from NGVD 29 to NAVD 88.) | California | Sierra Nevada | 4343 m 14,248 ft | 882 m 2,894 ft | 51.8 km 32.2 mi | 37.0943°N 118.5145°W |
| 47 | Mount Princeton | Colorado | Sawatch Range | 4329.3 m 14,204 ft | 664 m 2,177 ft | 8.36 km 5.19 mi | 38.7492°N 106.2424°W |
| 48 | Mount Yale | Colorado | Sawatch Range | 4328.2 m 14,200 ft | 578 m 1,896 ft | 8.93 km 5.55 mi | 38.8442°N 106.3138°W |
| 49 | Mount Shasta (Note: The summit of Mount Shasta is the highest point of the southern Cascade Range.) | California | Cascade Range | 4321.8 m 14,179 ft | 2979 m 9,772 ft | 539 km 335 mi | 41.4092°N 122.1949°W |
| 50 | Maroon Peak | Colorado | Elk Mountains | 4317 m 14,163 ft | 712 m 2,336 ft | 12.97 km 8.06 mi | 39.0708°N 106.9890°W |
| 51 | Mount Wrangell | Alaska | Wrangell Mountains | 4317 m 14,163 ft | 1711 m 5,613 ft | 23.8 km 14.79 mi | 62.0059°N 144.0187°W |
| 52 | Mount Sneffels (Note: The summit of Mount Sneffels is the highest point of the Sneffels Range.) | Colorado | Sneffels Range | 4315.4 m 14,158 ft | 930 m 3,050 ft | 25.3 km 15.71 mi | 38.0038°N 107.7923°W |
| 53 | Capitol Peak (Note: The elevation of Capitol Peak includes an adjustment of +1.991 m (6.53 ft) from NGVD 29 to NAVD 88.) | Colorado | Elk Mountains | 4309 m 14,137 ft | 533 m 1,750 ft | 11.98 km 7.44 mi | 39.1503°N 107.0829°W |
| 54 | Pikes Peak (Note: Pikes Peak is the easternmost 14,000-foot (4267-meter) summit and ultra-prominent summit of the Rocky Mountains. Pikes Peak was the inspiration for the lyrics of America the Beautiful.) | Colorado | Front Range | 4302.31 m 14,115 ft | 1686 m 5,530 ft | 97.6 km 60.6 mi | 38.8405°N 105.0442°W |
| 55 | Windom Peak (Note: The summit of Windom Peak is the highest point of the Needle Mountains.) (Note: Mount Eolus may be higher than Windom Peak.) (Note: The elevation of Windom Peak includes an adjustment of +1.785 m (5.86 ft) from NGVD 29 to NAVD 88.) | Colorado | Needle Mountains | 4296 m 14,093 ft | 667 m 2,187 ft | 42.4 km 26.3 mi | 37.6212°N 107.5919°W |
| 56 | Mount Augusta | Alaska; Yukon | Saint Elias Mountains | 4289 m 14,070 ft | 1549 m 5,082 ft | 23.2 km 14.41 mi | 60.3074°N 140.4584°W |
| 57 | Handies Peak | Colorado | San Juan Mountains | 4284.8 m 14,058 ft | 582 m 1,908 ft | 18 km 11.18 mi | 37.9130°N 107.5044°W |
| 58 | Culebra Peak (Note: The summit of Culebra Peak is the highest point of the Culebra Range.) (Note: Culebra Peak is the southernmost 14,000-foot (4267-meter) summit of the Rocky Mountains.) (Note: The elevation of Culebra Peak includes an adjustment of +1.74 m (5.71 ft) from NGVD 29 to NAVD 88.) | Colorado | Culebra Range | 4283 m 14,053 ft | 1471 m 4,827 ft | 56.9 km 35.4 mi | 37.1224°N 105.1858°W |
| 59 | Cofre de Perote (Note: Cofre de Perote is the northernmost and easternmost summit of its elevation in México.) (Naucampatépetl) | Veracruz | Cordillera Neovolcanica | 4282 m 14,049 ft | 1412 m 4,633 ft | 49.4 km 30.7 mi | 19.4940°N 97.1480°W |
| 60 | San Luis Peak (Note: The summit of San Luis Peak is the highest point of the La Garita Mountains.) | Colorado | La Garita Mountains | 4273.8 m 14,022 ft | 949 m 3,113 ft | 43.4 km 26.9 mi | 37.9868°N 106.9313°W |
| 61 | Mount of the Holy Cross (Note: The summit of Mount of the Holy Cross is the highest point of the northern Sawatch Range.) (Note: The summit elevation of Mount of the Holy Cross includes a vertical offset of +0.61 m (2 ft) from the station benchmark.) | Colorado | Sawatch Range | 4270.5 m 14,011 ft | 644 m 2,113 ft | 29.6 km 18.41 mi | 39.4668°N 106.4817°W |
| 62 | Nevado de Colima (Note: The summit of Nevado de Colima is the highest point of Estado Libre y Soberano de Jalisco.) (Note: Nevado de Colima is the northernmost and westernmost 4000-meter (13,123-foot) summit of México.) | Jalisco | Cordillera Neovolcanica | 4270 m 14,009 ft | 2720 m 8,924 ft | 405 km 252 mi | 19.5633°N 103.6087°W |
| 63 | Grizzly Peak | Colorado | Sawatch Range | 4265.6 m 13,995 ft | 588 m 1,928 ft | 10.89 km 6.77 mi | 39.0425°N 106.5976°W |
| 64 | Mount Humphreys (Note: The elevation of Mount Humphreys includes an adjustment of +1.842 m (6.04 ft) from NGVD 29 to NAVD 88.) | California | Sierra Nevada | 4265 m 13,992 ft | 781 m 2,563 ft | 23.7 km 14.71 mi | 37.2705°N 118.6730°W |
| 65 | Mount Keith (Note: The elevation of Mount Keith includes an adjustment of +1.795 m (5.89 ft) from NGVD 29 to NAVD 88.) | California | Sierra Nevada | 4262 m 13,982 ft | 590 m 1,936 ft | 4.97 km 3.09 mi | 36.7001°N 118.3436°W |
| 66 | Mount Strickland (Note: Mount Strickland is the northernmost summit of its elevation in Canada.) | Yukon | Saint Elias Mountains | 4260 m 13,976 ft | 800 m 2,625 ft | 7.35 km 4.57 mi | 61.2365°N 140.6755°W |
| 67 | Mount Ouray (Note: The summit of Mount Ouray is the highest point of the far southern Sawatch Range.) | Colorado | Sawatch Range | 4255.4 m 13,961 ft | 810 m 2,659 ft | 21.9 km 13.58 mi | 38.4227°N 106.2247°W |
| 68 | Vermilion Peak (Note: The elevation of Vermilion Peak includes an adjustment of +1.827 m (5.99 ft) from NGVD 29 to NAVD 88.) | Colorado | San Juan Mountains | 4237 m 13,900 ft | 642 m 2,105 ft | 14.6 km 9.07 mi | 37.7993°N 107.8285°W |
| 69 | Avalanche Peak (Note: Avalanche Peak is the northernmost summit of its elevation in Canada.) | Yukon | Saint Elias Mountains | 4228 m 13,871 ft | 608 m 1,995 ft | 4.54 km 2.82 mi | 61.2401°N 140.7597°W |
| 70 | Atna Peaks | Alaska | Wrangell Mountains | 4225 m 13,860 ft | 674 m 2,210 ft | 5.86 km 3.64 mi | 61.7495°N 143.2414°W |
| 71 | Volcán Tajumulco (Note: The summit of Volcán Tajumulco is the highest point of the Sierra de las Nubes, San Marcos, and all of Republic of Guatemala.) (Note: Volcán Tajumulco is the southernmost and easternmost 4000-meter (13,123-foot) summit of greater North America.) | Guatemala | Sierra de las Nubes | 4220 m 13,845 ft | 3990 m 13,091 ft | 722 km 448 mi | 15.0430°N 91.9037°W |
| 72 | Regal Mountain | Alaska | Wrangell Mountains | 4220 m 13,845 ft | 1340 m 4,395 ft | 19.72 km 12.25 mi | 61.7438°N 142.8675°W |
| 73 | Mount Darwin (Note: The elevation of Mount Darwin includes an adjustment of +1.886 m (6.19 ft) from NGVD 29 to NAVD 88.) | California | Sierra Nevada | 4218 m 13,837 ft | 576 m 1,891 ft | 11.48 km 7.13 mi | 37.1669°N 118.6721°W |
| 74 | Mount Hayes (Note: The summit of Mount Hayes is the highest point of the Hayes Range.) (Note: Mount Hayes is the northernmost 4000-meter (13,123-foot) summit of Alaska, the United States, and greater North America.) | Alaska | Alaska Range | 4216 m 13,832 ft | 3507 m 11,507 ft | 202 km 125.5 mi | 63.6203°N 146.7178°W |
| 75 | Mount Silverheels | Colorado | Front Range | 4215 m 13,829 ft | 696 m 2,283 ft | 8.82 km 5.48 mi | 39.3394°N 106.0054°W |
| 76 | Rio Grande Pyramid | Colorado | San Juan Mountains | 4214.4 m 13,827 ft | 573 m 1,881 ft | 17.31 km 10.76 mi | 37.6797°N 107.3924°W |
| 77 | Gannett Peak (Note: The summit of Gannett Peak is the highest point of the Wind River Range, the U.S. State of Wyoming, and the central Rocky Mountains.) (Note: Gannett Peak is the northernmost and westernmost summit of its elevation in the Rocky Mountains.) | Wyoming | Wind River Range | 4209.1 m 13,809 ft | 2157 m 7,076 ft | 467 km 290 mi | 43.1842°N 109.6542°W |
| 78 | Mount Kaweah (Note: The summit of Mount Kaweah is the highest point of the Great Western Divide.) (Note: Mount Kaweah is the southernmost summit of its elevation in United States.) (Note: The elevation of Mount Kaweah includes an adjustment of +1.652 m (5.42 ft) from NGVD 29 to NAVD 88.) | California | Sierra Nevada | 4209 m 13,807 ft | 618 m 2,027 ft | 17.27 km 10.73 mi | 36.5261°N 118.4785°W |
| 79 | Grand Teton (Note: The summit of Grand Teton is the highest point of the Teton Range.) (Note: Grand Teton is the northernmost and westernmost 4000-meter (13,123-foot) summit of the Rocky Mountains.) | Wyoming | Teton Range | 4198.7 m 13,775 ft | 1995 m 6,545 ft | 111.6 km 69.4 mi | 43.7412°N 110.8024°W |
| 80 | Mount Cook | Alaska; Yukon | Saint Elias Mountains | 4194 m 13,760 ft | 2350 m 7,710 ft | 23.4 km 14.54 mi | 60.1816°N 139.9811°W |
| 81 | Mount Morgan | California | Sierra Nevada | 4193.4 m 13,758 ft | 807 m 2,648 ft | 15.87 km 9.86 mi | 37.4053°N 118.7329°W |
| 82 | Mount Gabb (Note: The elevation of Mount Gabb includes an adjustment of +1.958 m (6.42 ft) from NGVD 29 to NAVD 88.) | California | Sierra Nevada | 4190 m 13,747 ft | 793 m 2,601 ft | 6.89 km 4.28 mi | 37.3769°N 118.8025°W |
| 83 | Bald Mountain (Note: The elevation of Bald Mountain includes an adjustment of +1.922 m (6.31 ft) from NGVD 29 to NAVD 88.) | Colorado | Front Range | 4173 m 13,690 ft | 640 m 2,099 ft | 12.09 km 7.51 mi | 39.4448°N 105.9705°W |
| 84 | Mount Oso (Note: The elevation of Mount Oso includes an adjustment of +1.776 m (5.83 ft) from NGVD 29 to NAVD 88.) | Colorado | San Juan Mountains | 4173 m 13,690 ft | 507 m 1,664 ft | 8.71 km 5.41 mi | 37.6070°N 107.4936°W |
| 85 | Mount Jackson | Colorado | Sawatch Range | 4168.5 m 13,676 ft | 552 m 1,810 ft | 5.16 km 3.21 mi | 39.4853°N 106.5367°W |
| 86 | Mount Tom (Note: The elevation of Mount Tom includes an adjustment of +1.379 m (4.52 ft) from NGVD 29 to NAVD 88.) | California | Sierra Nevada | 4163 m 13,657 ft | 607 m 1,992 ft | 7.67 km 4.77 mi | 37.3385°N 118.6585°W |
| 87 | Bard Peak (Note: The elevation of Bard Peak includes an adjustment of +1.707 m (5.6 ft) from NGVD 29 to NAVD 88.) | Colorado | Front Range | 4159 m 13,647 ft | 518 m 1,701 ft | 8.74 km 5.43 mi | 39.7204°N 105.8044°W |
| 88 | Cerro Tláloc (Note: The summit of Cerro Tláloc is the highest point of Sierra de Río Frío.) | México | Cordillera Neovolcanica | 4158 m 13,642 ft | 968 m 3,176 ft | 22.7 km 14.07 mi | 19.4125°N 98.7124°W |
| 89 | West Spanish Peak (Note: West Spanish Peak is the easternmost 4000-meter (13,123-foot) summit of the Rocky Mountains and the United States.) (Note: The elevation of West Spanish Peak includes an adjustment of +1.468 m (4.82 ft) from NGVD 29 to NAVD 88.) | Colorado | Spanish Peaks | 4155 m 13,631 ft | 1123 m 3,686 ft | 32 km 19.87 mi | 37.3756°N 104.9934°W |
| 90 | Mount Powell (Note: The summit of Mount Powell is the highest point of the Gore Range.) (Note: The elevation of Mount Powell includes an adjustment of +1.771 m (5.81 ft) from NGVD 29 to NAVD 88.) | Colorado | Gore Range | 4141 m 13,586 ft | 914 m 3,000 ft | 34.6 km 21.5 mi | 39.7601°N 106.3407°W |
| 91 | Hagues Peak (Note: The summit of Hagues Peak is the highest point of the Mummy Range.) | Colorado | Mummy Range | 4137 m 13,573 ft | 738 m 2,420 ft | 25.3 km 15.7 mi | 40.4845°N 105.6464°W |
| 92 | Mount Dubois (Note: The elevation of Mount Dubois includes an adjustment of +1.879 m (6.16 ft) from NGVD 29 to NAVD 88.) | California | White Mountains | 4135 m 13,565 ft | 713 m 2,339 ft | 15.5 km 9.63 mi | 37.7834°N 118.3432°W |
| 93 | Tower Mountain (Note: The elevation of Tower Mountain includes an adjustment of +1.796 m (5.89 ft) from NGVD 29 to NAVD 88.) | Colorado | San Juan Mountains | 4132 m 13,558 ft | 504 m 1,652 ft | 7.86 km 4.88 mi | 37.8573°N 107.6230°W |
| 94 | Treasure Mountain (Note: The elevation of Treasure Mountain includes an adjustment of +2.008 m (6.59 ft) from NGVD 29 to NAVD 88.) | Colorado | Elk Mountains | 4125 m 13,535 ft | 862 m 2,828 ft | 11.13 km 6.92 mi | 39.0244°N 107.1228°W |
| 95 | Kings Peak (Note: The summit of Kings Peak is the highest point of the Uinta Mountains, the U.S. State of Utah, and the western Rocky Mountains.) (Note: The elevation of Kings Peak includes an adjustment of +1.807 m (5.93 ft) from NGVD 29 to NAVD 88.) | Utah | Uinta Mountains | 4125 m 13,534 ft | 1938 m 6,358 ft | 268 km 166.6 mi | 40.7763°N 110.3729°W |
| 96 | North Arapaho Peak (Note: The summit of North Arapaho Peak is the highest point of the Indian Peaks.) (Note: The elevation of North Arapaho Peak includes an adjustment of +1.763 m (5.78 ft) from NGVD 29 to NAVD 88.) | Colorado | Front Range | 4117 m 13,508 ft | 507 m 1,665 ft | 24.8 km 15.38 mi | 40.0265°N 105.6504°W |
| 97 | Mount Pinchot (Note: The elevation of Mount Pinchot includes an adjustment of +1.81 m (5.94 ft) from NGVD 29 to NAVD 88.) | California | Sierra Nevada | 4115 m 13,500 ft | 643 m 2,110 ft | 7.58 km 4.71 mi | 36.9473°N 118.4054°W |
| 98 | Mount Natazhat | Alaska | Saint Elias Mountains | 4095 m 13,435 ft | 1824 m 5,985 ft | 24.9 km 15.49 mi | 61.5217°N 141.1030°W |
| 99 | Mount Jarvis | Alaska | Wrangell Mountains | 4091 m 13,421 ft | 1454 m 4,771 ft | 17.95 km 11.15 mi | 62.0234°N 143.6198°W |
| 100 | Parry Peak (Note: The elevation of Parry Peak includes an adjustment of +1.763 m (5.78 ft) from NGVD 29 to NAVD 88.) | Colorado | Front Range | 4083 m 13,397 ft | 524 m 1,720 ft | 15.22 km 9.46 mi | 39.8381°N 105.7132°W |
| 101 | Bill Williams Peak (Note: The summit of Bill Williams Peak is the highest point of the Williams Mountains.) (Note: The elevation of Bill Williams Peak includes an adjustment of +2.044 m (6.71 ft) from NGVD 29 to NAVD 88.) | Colorado | Williams Mountains | 4081 m 13,389 ft | 513 m 1,682 ft | 5.98 km 3.72 mi | 39.1806°N 106.6102°W |
| 102 | Sultan Mountain (Note: The elevation of Sultan Mountain includes an adjustment of +1.649 m (5.41 ft) from NGVD 29 to NAVD 88.) | Colorado | San Juan Mountains | 4076 m 13,373 ft | 569 m 1,868 ft | 7.39 km 4.59 mi | 37.7859°N 107.7038°W |
| 103 | Mount Herard (Note: The elevation of Mount Herard includes an adjustment of +1.64 m (5.38 ft) from NGVD 29 to NAVD 88.) | Colorado | Sangre de Cristo Mountains | 4068 m 13,345 ft | 622 m 2,040 ft | 7.45 km 4.63 mi | 37.8492°N 105.4949°W |
| 104 | Volcán Tacaná (Note: Volcán Tacaná on the international border with Guatemala is the highest point of Estado Libre y Soberano de Chiapas.) | Chiapas; Guatemala | Sierra Madre de Chiapas | 4067 m 13,343 ft | 1017 m 3,337 ft | 23.8 km 14.78 mi | 15.1325°N 92.1085°W |
| 105 | West Buffalo Peak (Note: The elevation of West Buffalo Peak includes an adjustment of +1.834 m (6.02 ft) from NGVD 29 to NAVD 88.) | Colorado | Mosquito Range | 4064 m 13,332 ft | 605 m 1,986 ft | 15.46 km 9.61 mi | 38.9917°N 106.1249°W |
| 106 | Mount Craig (Note: Mount Craig is the northernmost 4000-meter (13,123-foot) summit of Canada.) | Yukon | Saint Elias Mountains | 4060 m 13,320 ft | 520 m 1,706 ft | 6.97 km 4.33 mi | 61.2636°N 140.8800°W |
| 107 | Tressider Peak | Alaska | Saint Elias Mountains | 4058 m 13,315 ft | 507 m 1,665 ft | 5.34 km 3.32 mi | 61.3590°N 141.6664°W |
| 108 | Summit Peak (Note: The summit of Summit Peak is the highest point of the southern San Juan Mountains.) | Colorado | San Juan Mountains | 4056.2 m 13,308 ft | 841 m 2,760 ft | 63.7 km 39.6 mi | 37.3506°N 106.6968°W |
| 109 | Middle Peak (Note: Dolores Peak may be higher than Middle Peak.) (Note: The elevation of Middle Peak includes an adjustment of +1.809 m (5.94 ft) from NGVD 29 to NAVD 88.) | Colorado | San Miguel Mountains | 4056 m 13,306 ft | 597 m 1,960 ft | 7.69 km 4.78 mi | 37.8536°N 108.1082°W |
| 110 | Antora Peak (Note: The elevation of Antora Peak includes an adjustment of +1.883 m (6.18 ft) from NGVD 29 to NAVD 88.) | Colorado | Sawatch Range | 4046 m 13,275 ft | 734 m 2,409 ft | 10.86 km 6.75 mi | 38.3250°N 106.2180°W |
| 111 | Henry Mountain (Note: The elevation of Henry Mountain includes an adjustment of +2.037 m (6.68 ft) from NGVD 29 to NAVD 88.) | Colorado | Sawatch Range | 4042 m 13,261 ft | 510 m 1,674 ft | 17.61 km 10.94 mi | 38.6856°N 106.6211°W |
| 112 | Hesperus Mountain (Note: The summit of Hesperus Mountain is the highest point of the La Plata Mountains.) (Note: The elevation of Hesperus Mountain includes an adjustment of +1.65 m (5.41 ft) from NGVD 29 to NAVD 88.) | Colorado | La Plata Mountains | 4035 m 13,237 ft | 869 m 2,852 ft | 39.5 km 24.5 mi | 37.4451°N 108.0890°W |
| 113 | Mount Silverthrone | Alaska | Alaska Range | 4029 m 13,220 ft | 988 m 3,240 ft | 12.72 km 7.9 mi | 63.1157°N 150.6755°W |
| 114 | Jacque Peak (Note: The elevation of Jacque Peak includes an adjustment of +1.866 m (6.12 ft) from NGVD 29 to NAVD 88.) | Colorado | Gore Range | 4027 m 13,211 ft | 629 m 2,065 ft | 7.28 km 4.52 mi | 39.4549°N 106.1970°W |
| 115 | Bennett Peak (Note: The elevation of Bennett Peak includes an adjustment of +1.782 m (5.85 ft) from NGVD 29 to NAVD 88.) | Colorado | San Juan Mountains | 4026 m 13,209 ft | 531 m 1,743 ft | 27.5 km 17.08 mi | 37.4833°N 106.4343°W |
| 116 | Wind River Peak (Note: The summit of Wind River Peak is the highest point of the southern Wind River Range.) | Wyoming | Wind River Range | 4022.4 m 13,197 ft | 784 m 2,572 ft | 56.6 km 35.1 mi | 42.7085°N 109.1284°W |
| 117 | Mount Waddington (Note: The summit of Mount Waddington is the highest point of the Coast Mountains.) (Note: Mount Waddington is the southernmost and easternmost 4000-meter (13,123-foot) summit of Canada.) | British Columbia | Coast Mountains | 4019 m 13,186 ft | 3289 m 10,791 ft | 562 km 349 mi | 51.3737°N 125.2636°W |
| 118 | Conejos Peak | Colorado | San Juan Mountains | 4017 m 13,179 ft | 583 m 1,912 ft | 13.12 km 8.15 mi | 37.2887°N 106.5709°W |
| 119 | Mount Marcus Baker (Note: The summit of Mount Marcus Baker is the highest point of the Chugach Mountains.) | Alaska | Chugach Mountains | 4016 m 13,176 ft | 3277 m 10,751 ft | 203 km 126.3 mi | 61.4374°N 147.7525°W |
| 120 | Cloud Peak (Note: The summit of Cloud Peak is the highest point of the Bighorn Mountains.) (Note: Cloud Peak is the northernmost 4000-meter (13,123-foot) summit of the Rocky Mountains.) | Wyoming | Bighorn Mountains | 4013.3 m 13,167 ft | 2157 m 7,077 ft | 233 km 145 mi | 44.3821°N 107.1739°W |
| 120 | Wheeler Peak (Note: The summit of Wheeler Peak is the highest point of the Taos Mountains and the U.S. State of New Mexico.) (Note: Wheeler Peak is the southernmost 4000-meter (13,123-foot) summit of the Rocky Mountains.) | New Mexico | Taos Mountains | 4013.3 m 13,167 ft | 1039 m 3,409 ft | 59.6 km 37 mi | 36.5569°N 105.4169°W |
| 122 | Francs Peak (Note: The summit of Francs Peak is the highest point of the Absaroka Range.) | Wyoming | Absaroka Range | 4012.3 m 13,164 ft | 1236 m 4,056 ft | 76 km 47.2 mi | 43.9613°N 109.3392°W |
| 123 | Twilight Peak (Note: The summit of Twilight Peak is the highest point of the West Needle Mountains.) (Note: The elevation of Twilight Peak includes an adjustment of +1.537 m (5.04 ft) from NGVD 29 to NAVD 88.) | Colorado | Needle Mountains | 4012 m 13,163 ft | 713 m 2,338 ft | 7.86 km 4.88 mi | 37.6630°N 107.7270°W |
| 124 | South River Peak | Colorado | San Juan Mountains | 4009.4 m 13,154 ft | 746 m 2,448 ft | 34 km 21.1 mi | 37.5741°N 106.9815°W |
| 125 | Mount Ritter (Note: The summit of Mount Ritter is the highest point of the Ritter Range.) (Note: The elevation of Mount Ritter includes an adjustment of +1.786 m (5.86 ft) from NGVD 29 to NAVD 88.) | California | Sierra Nevada | 4008 m 13,149 ft | 1216 m 3,990 ft | 35.4 km 22 mi | 37.6891°N 119.1996°W |
| 126 | Red Slate Mountain (Note: The elevation of Red Slate Mountain includes an adjustment of +1.893 m (6.21 ft) from NGVD 29 to NAVD 88.) | California | Sierra Nevada | 4002 m 13,129 ft | 529 m 1,736 ft | 13.38 km 8.31 mi | 37.5075°N 118.8693°W |
| 127 | Mount Lyell (California) | California | Sierra Nevada | 3998.9 m 13,120 ft | 587 m 1,926 ft | 8.46 km 5.26 mi | 37.7394°N 119.2716°W |
| 128 | Bushnell Peak | Colorado | Sangre de Cristo Mountains | 3995.8 m 13,110 ft | 733 m 2,405 ft | 17.82 km 11.07 mi | 38.3412°N 105.8892°W |
| 129 | Truchas Peak (Note: The summit of Truchas Peak is the highest point of the Santa Fe Mountains.) (Note: Truchas Peak is the southernmost summit of its elevation in the Rocky Mountains.) | New Mexico | Santa Fe Mountains | 3995.2 m 13,108 ft | 1220 m 4,001 ft | 68.2 km 42.3 mi | 35.9625°N 105.6450°W |
| 130 | Wheeler Peak (Note: The summit of Wheeler Peak is the highest point of the Snake Range.) | Nevada | Snake Range | 3982.3 m 13,065 ft | 2307 m 7,568 ft | 373 km 232 mi | 38.9861°N 114.3133°W |
| 131 | Mount Dana | California | Sierra Nevada | 3981.5 m 13,063 ft | 743 m 2,437 ft | 18.35 km 11.4 mi | 37.8999°N 119.2211°W |
| 132 | Spring Glacier Peak | Yukon | Saint Elias Mountains | 3976 m 13,045 ft | 676 m 2,218 ft | 6 km 3.73 mi | 61.0408°N 139.9328°W |
| 133 | West Elk Peak (Note: The summit of West Elk Peak is the highest point of the West Elk Mountains.) | Colorado | West Elk Mountains | 3975.2 m 13,042 ft | 943 m 3,095 ft | 22.2 km 13.78 mi | 38.7179°N 107.1994°W |
| 134 | Volcán Acatenango (Note: Volcán Acatenango is the southernmost and easternmost summit of its elevation in Central America and greater North America.) | Guatemala | Chimaltenango | 3975 m 13,041 ft | 1835 m 6,020 ft | 125.9 km 78.2 mi | 14.5016°N 90.8755°W |
| 135 | Mount Moffit | Alaska | Alaska Range | 3969 m 13,020 ft | 1210 m 3,970 ft | 16.41 km 10.2 mi | 63.5683°N 146.3982°W |
| 136 | Mount Centennial (Note: The elevation of Mount Centennial includes an adjustment of +1.814 m (5.95 ft) from NGVD 29 to NAVD 88.) (Peak 13010) | Colorado | San Juan Mountains | 3967 m 13,016 ft | 546 m 1,790 ft | 4.61 km 2.86 mi | 37.6062°N 107.2446°W |
| 137 | Mount Robson (Note: The summit of Mount Robson is the highest point of the Canadian Rockies.) (Note: Mount Robson is the easternmost summit of its elevation in Canada and the northernmost and westernmost summit of its elevation in the Rocky Mountains.) | British Columbia | Canadian Rockies | 3959 m 12,989 ft | 2829 m 9,281 ft | 460 km 286 mi | 53.1105°N 119.1566°W |
| 138 | Clark Peak (Note: The summit of Clark Peak is the highest point of the Medicine Bow Mountains.) | Colorado | Medicine Bow Mountains | 3948.4 m 12,954 ft | 845 m 2,771 ft | 26.4 km 16.4 mi | 40.6068°N 105.9300°W |
| 139 | Mount Richthofen (Note: The summit of Mount Richthofen is the highest point of the Never Summer Mountains.) (Note: The elevation of Mount Richthofen includes an adjustment of +1.658 m (5.44 ft) from NGVD 29 to NAVD 88.) | Colorado | Never Summer Mountains | 3946 m 12,945 ft | 817 m 2,680 ft | 15.54 km 9.66 mi | 40.4695°N 105.8945°W |
| 140 | Cerro del Ajusco (Pico del Águila) (Note: The summit of Cerro del Ajusco (Pico del Águila) is the highest point of Distrito Federal de México.) | Mexico City | Cordillera Neovolcanica | 3937 m 12,917 ft | 1227 m 4,026 ft | 53.5 km 33.2 mi | 19.2074°N 99.2582°W |
| 141 | Mount Harrison (Yukon) | Yukon | Saint Elias Mountains | 3935 m 12,910 ft | 875 m 2,871 ft | 11 km 6.84 mi | 61.0781°N 140.1019°W |
| 142 | Mount Queen Mary | Yukon | Saint Elias Mountains | 3928 m 12,887 ft | 1348 m 4,423 ft | 25.3 km 15.69 mi | 60.6286°N 139.7247°W |
| 142 | Mount Root | Alaska; British Columbia | Saint Elias Mountains | 3928 m 12,887 ft | 908 m 2,979 ft | 8.79 km 5.46 mi | 58.9854°N 137.5001°W |
| 144 | Lizard Head Peak (Note: The summit of Lizard Head Peak is the highest point of the Cirque of the Towers.) (Note: The elevation of Lizard Head Peak includes an adjustment of +1.572 m (5.16 ft) from NGVD 29 to NAVD 88.) | Wyoming | Wind River Range | 3916 m 12,847 ft | 580 m 1,902 ft | 10.4 km 6.46 mi | 42.7901°N 109.1978°W |
| 145 | Granite Peak (Note: The summit of Granite Peak is the highest point of the Beartooth Mountains and the U.S. State of Montana.) | Montana | Beartooth Mountains | 3903.5 m 12,807 ft | 1457 m 4,779 ft | 138.5 km 86 mi | 45.1634°N 109.8075°W |
| 146 | Mount Crosson | Alaska | Alaska Range | 3901 m 12,800 ft | 503 m 1,650 ft | 8.22 km 5.11 mi | 63.0081°N 151.2763°W |
| 147 | Venado Peak (Note: The elevation of Venado Peak includes an adjustment of +1.65 m (5.41 ft) from NGVD 29 to NAVD 88.) | New Mexico | Taos Mountains | 3883 m 12,739 ft | 906 m 2,971 ft | 18.99 km 11.8 mi | 36.7917°N 105.4933°W |
| 148 | Chair Mountain | Colorado | Elk Mountains | 3879.1 m 12,727 ft | 750 m 2,461 ft | 14.3 km 8.89 mi | 39.0581°N 107.2822°W |
| 149 | Mount Peale (Note: The summit of Mount Peale is the highest point of the La Sal Mountains and the Colorado Plateau.) | Utah | La Sal Mountains | 3879 m 12,726 ft | 1884 m 6,181 ft | 117.1 km 72.8 mi | 38.4385°N 109.2292°W |
| 150 | Mount Crillon | Alaska | Saint Elias Mountains | 3879 m 12,726 ft | 2187 m 7,176 ft | 31.4 km 19.52 mi | 58.6625°N 137.1712°W |
| 151 | Mount Gunnison | Colorado | West Elk Mountains | 3878.7 m 12,725 ft | 1079 m 3,539 ft | 19.05 km 11.84 mi | 38.8121°N 107.3826°W |
| 152 | East Spanish Peak (Note: East Spanish Peak is the easternmost 3000-meter (9843-foot) summit of the Rocky Mountains and the United States.) (Note: The elevation of East Spanish Peak includes an adjustment of +1.372 m (4.5 ft) from NGVD 29 to NAVD 88.) | Colorado | Spanish Peaks | 3867 m 12,688 ft | 726 m 2,383 ft | 6.78 km 4.21 mi | 37.3934°N 104.9201°W |
| 153 | Borah Peak (Note: The summit of Borah Peak is the highest point of the Lost River Range and the U.S. State of Idaho.) | Idaho | Lost River Range | 3861.2 m 12,668 ft | 1829 m 6,002 ft | 243 km 150.8 mi | 44.1374°N 113.7811°W |
| 154 | Mount Wood (Note: The summit of Mount Wood is the highest point of the Granite Range.) (Note: The elevation of Mount Wood includes an adjustment of +1.516 m (4.97 ft) from NGVD 29 to NAVD 88.) | Montana | Absaroka Range | 3860 m 12,665 ft | 878 m 2,880 ft | 12.04 km 7.48 mi | 45.2749°N 109.8078°W |
| 155 | Mount Gunnar Naslund | Alaska | Saint Elias Mountains | 3858 m 12,658 ft | 643 m 2,108 ft | 11.04 km 6.86 mi | 61.2282°N 141.3140°W |
| 156 | Mount Conness | California | Sierra Nevada | 3855.5 m 12,649 ft | 808 m 2,650 ft | 11.55 km 7.18 mi | 37.9670°N 119.3213°W |
| 157 | Humphreys Peak (Note: The summit of Humphreys Peak is the highest point of the San Francisco Peaks and the U.S. State of Arizona.) (Note: The elevation of Humphreys Peak includes an adjustment of +1.345 m (4.41 ft) from NGVD 29 to NAVD 88.) | Arizona | San Francisco Peaks | 3852 m 12,637 ft | 1841 m 6,039 ft | 396 km 246 mi | 35.3464°N 111.6780°W |
| 158 | Santa Fe Baldy (Note: Santa Fe Baldy is the southernmost 3000-meter (9843-foot) summit of the Rocky Mountains.) | New Mexico | Santa Fe Mountains | 3850.1 m 12,632 ft | 610 m 2,002 ft | 17.69 km 10.99 mi | 35.8322°N 105.7581°W |
| 159 | Gothic Mountain (Note: The elevation of Gothic Mountain includes an adjustment of +1.936 m (6.35 ft) from NGVD 29 to NAVD 88.) | Colorado | Elk Mountains | 3850 m 12,631 ft | 501 m 1,645 ft | 4.39 km 2.73 mi | 38.9562°N 107.0107°W |
| 160 | Castle Mountain | Montana | Absaroka Range | 3846.1 m 12,618 ft | 814 m 2,672 ft | 15.67 km 9.74 mi | 45.0989°N 109.6305°W |
| 160 | Lone Cone | Colorado | San Miguel Mountains | 3846.1 m 12,618 ft | 693 m 2,273 ft | 13.52 km 8.4 mi | 37.8880°N 108.2556°W |
| 162 | Mount Moran | Wyoming | Teton Range | 3843.5 m 12,610 ft | 806 m 2,645 ft | 9.94 km 6.18 mi | 43.8350°N 110.7765°W |
| 163 | Mount Tlingit | Alaska | Saint Elias Mountains | 3842 m 12,606 ft | 611 m 2,006 ft | 3.63 km 2.26 mi | 58.8931°N 137.3938°W |
| 164 | Volcán Tancítaro (Note: The summit of Volcán Tancítaro is the highest point of Estado Libre y Soberano de Michoacán de Ocampo.) | Michoacán | Cordillera Neovolcanica | 3840 m 12,598 ft | 1665 m 5,463 ft | 136.3 km 84.7 mi | 19.4166°N 102.3198°W |
| 165 | Mount Tiedemann | British Columbia | Coast Mountains | 3838 m 12,592 ft | 848 m 2,782 ft | 2.86 km 1.78 mi | 51.3940°N 125.2366°W |
| 166 | Alto Cuchumatanes (Note: Alto Cuchumatanes is the northernmost 3000-meter (9843-foot) summit of Central America.) | Guatemala | Huehuetenango | 3837 m 12,589 ft | 1877 m 6,158 ft | 65.2 km 40.5 mi | 15.5182°N 91.5445°W |
| 167 | Little Costilla Peak | New Mexico | Culebra Range | 3836.8 m 12,588 ft | 745 m 2,444 ft | 12.48 km 7.75 mi | 36.8335°N 105.2229°W |
| 168 | Volcán de Colima (Note: Volcán de Colima on the border of Jalisco is the highest point of Estado Libre y Soberano de Colima and the westernmost summit of its elevation in México.) | Colima; Jalisco | Cordillera Neovolcanica | 3830 m 12,566 ft | 610 m 2,001 ft | 5.62 km 3.49 mi | 19.5132°N 103.6174°W |
| 169 | Mount Carpe | Alaska | Alaska Range | 3825 m 12,550 ft | 549 m 1,800 ft | 6.6 km 4.1 mi | 63.1521°N 150.8616°W |
| 170 | Needham Mountain (Note: The elevation of Needham Mountain includes an adjustment of +1.602 m (5.26 ft) from NGVD 29 to NAVD 88.) | California | Sierra Nevada | 3824 m 12,545 ft | 561 m 1,840 ft | 9.54 km 5.93 mi | 36.4545°N 118.5373°W |
| 171 | Graham Peak | Colorado | San Juan Mountains | 3821.1 m 12,536 ft | 778 m 2,551 ft | 13.9 km 8.64 mi | 37.4972°N 107.3761°W |
| 172 | Centennial Peak | Yukon | Saint Elias Mountains | 3820 m 12,533 ft | 960 m 3,150 ft | 9.77 km 6.07 mi | 60.9470°N 140.7217°W |
| 173 | Chirripó Grande (Note: The summit of Chirripó Grande is the highest point of the Republic of Costa Rica.) (Note: Chirripó Grande is the southernmost and easternmost summit of its elevation in Central America and greater North America.) (Cerro Chirripó) | Costa Rica | Cordillera de Talamanca | 3819 m 12,530 ft | 3755 m 12,320 ft | 878 km 546 mi | 9.4843°N 83.4889°W |
| 174 | Whetstone Mountain | Colorado | West Elk Mountains | 3818.1 m 12,527 ft | 749 m 2,456 ft | 15.11 km 9.39 mi | 38.8223°N 106.9799°W |
| 175 | Kahiltna Dome | Alaska | Alaska Range | 3818 m 12,525 ft | 663 m 2,175 ft | 5.55 km 3.45 mi | 63.0550°N 151.2394°W |
| 176 | Mount Thor | Alaska | Chugach Mountains | 3816 m 12,521 ft | 997 m 3,271 ft | 32.8 km 20.4 mi | 61.4854°N 147.1460°W |
| 177 | Mount Watson | Alaska | Saint Elias Mountains | 3809 m 12,497 ft | 589 m 1,932 ft | 4.05 km 2.52 mi | 59.0088°N 137.5541°W |
| 178 | Atlantic Peak (Note: The elevation of Atlantic Peak includes an adjustment of +1.521 m (4.99 ft) from NGVD 29 to NAVD 88.) | Wyoming | Wind River Range | 3808 m 12,495 ft | 655 m 2,150 ft | 14.6 km 9.07 mi | 42.6165°N 109.0013°W |
| 179 | Specimen Mountain (Note: The elevation of Specimen Mountain includes an adjustment of +1.614 m (5.3 ft) from NGVD 29 to NAVD 88.) | Colorado | Front Range | 3808 m 12,494 ft | 528 m 1,731 ft | 7.56 km 4.7 mi | 40.4449°N 105.8081°W |
| 180 | Baldy Mountain (Note: The summit of Baldy Mountain is the highest point of the Cimarron Range.) | New Mexico | Cimarron Range | 3793.3 m 12,445 ft | 823 m 2,701 ft | 18.24 km 11.33 mi | 36.6299°N 105.2134°W |
| 181 | East Beckwith Mountain | Colorado | West Elk Mountains | 3792.1 m 12,441 ft | 760 m 2,492 ft | 10.05 km 6.24 mi | 38.8464°N 107.2233°W |
| 182 | Knobby Crest (Note: The summit of Knobby Crest is the highest point of the Kenosha Mountains.) (Note: The elevation of Knobby Crest includes an adjustment of +1.595 m (5.23 ft) from NGVD 29 to NAVD 88.) | Colorado | Kenosha Mountains | 3790 m 12,434 ft | 536 m 1,759 ft | 13.31 km 8.27 mi | 39.3681°N 105.6050°W |
| 183 | Bison Peak (Note: The summit of Bison Peak is the highest point of the Tarryall Mountains.) | Colorado | Tarryall Mountains | 3789.4 m 12,432 ft | 747 m 2,451 ft | 29.3 km 18.23 mi | 39.2384°N 105.4978°W |
| 184 | Anthracite Range High Point | Colorado | West Elk Mountains | 3777.8 m 12,394 ft | 648 m 2,125 ft | 7.68 km 4.77 mi | 38.8145°N 107.1445°W |
| 185 | Matchless Mountain (Note: The elevation of Matchless Mountain includes an adjustment of +1.941 m (6.37 ft) from NGVD 29 to NAVD 88.) | Colorado | Elk Mountains | 3776 m 12,389 ft | 537 m 1,763 ft | 12.67 km 7.87 mi | 38.8340°N 106.6451°W |
| 186 | Mount Malaspina | Yukon | Saint Elias Mountains | 3776 m 12,388 ft | 936 m 3,071 ft | 6.39 km 3.97 mi | 60.3182°N 140.5719°W |
| 187 | Volcán Santa María | Guatemala | Sierra Madre | 3772 m 12,375 ft | 1054 m 3,458 ft | 49.4 km 30.7 mi | 14.7570°N 91.5517°W |
| 188 | Flat Top Mountain (Note: The summit of Flat Top Mountain is the highest point of the Flat Tops.) | Colorado | Flat Tops | 3767.7 m 12,361 ft | 1236 m 4,054 ft | 65.6 km 40.8 mi | 40.0147°N 107.0833°W |
| 189 | Mount Nystrom | Wyoming | Wind River Range | 3767.5 m 12,361 ft | 554 m 1,816 ft | 7.92 km 4.92 mi | 42.6418°N 109.0939°W |
| 190 | Moby Dick | Alaska | Alaska Range | 3767 m 12,360 ft | 887 m 2,910 ft | 7.7 km 4.78 mi | 63.5561°N 146.6026°W |
| 191 | Greenhorn Mountain (Note: The summit of Greenhorn Mountain is the highest point of the Wet Mountains.) | Colorado | Wet Mountains | 3765 m 12,352 ft | 1151 m 3,777 ft | 40.6 km 25.2 mi | 37.8815°N 105.0133°W |
| 192 | Elliott Mountain (Note: The elevation of Elliott Mountain includes an adjustment of +1.709 m (5.61 ft) from NGVD 29 to NAVD 88.) | Colorado | San Miguel Mountains | 3763 m 12,346 ft | 683 m 2,240 ft | 8.26 km 5.13 mi | 37.7344°N 108.0580°W |
| 193 | Volcán de Agua | Guatemala | Escuintla | 3761 m 12,339 ft | 1981 m 6,499 ft | 14.86 km 9.23 mi | 14.4654°N 90.7428°W |
| 194 | Mount Deborah (Note: Mount Deborah is the northernmost summit of its elevation in Alaska, the United States, and greater North America.) | Alaska | Alaska Range | 3761 m 12,339 ft | 1582 m 5,189 ft | 25.9 km 16.08 mi | 63.6377°N 147.2384°W |
| 195 | Twin Peaks (Note: The elevation of Twin Peaks includes an adjustment of +1.717 m (5.63 ft) from NGVD 29 to NAVD 88.) | California | Sierra Nevada | 3758 m 12,329 ft | 653 m 2,143 ft | 7.7 km 4.78 mi | 38.0836°N 119.3588°W |
| 196 | Carter Mountain | Wyoming | Absaroka Range | 3756.4 m 12,324 ft | 518 m 1,699 ft | 26.8 km 16.68 mi | 44.1972°N 109.4112°W |
| 197 | Parkview Mountain (Note: The summit of Parkview Mountain is the highest point of the Rabbit Ears Range.) | Colorado | Rabbit Ears Range | 3749.4 m 12,301 ft | 816 m 2,676 ft | 15.07 km 9.36 mi | 40.3303°N 106.1363°W |
| 198 | Cornwall Mountain (Note: The elevation of Cornwall Mountain includes an adjustment of +1.715 m (5.63 ft) from NGVD 29 to NAVD 88.) | Colorado | San Juan Mountains | 3746 m 12,291 ft | 532 m 1,744 ft | 8.37 km 5.2 mi | 37.3811°N 106.4920°W |
| 199 | Mount Adams | Washington | Cascade Range | 3743.4 m 12,281 ft | 2480 m 8,136 ft | 73.6 km 45.8 mi | 46.2024°N 121.4909°W |
| 200 | Mount Columbia (Note: Mount Columbia on the Great Divide between British Columbia and Alberta is the highest point of the Columbia Icefield, the Province of Alberta, and the entire Beaufort Sea Drainage basin.) | Alberta; British Columbia | Canadian Rockies | 3741 m 12,274 ft | 2371 m 7,779 ft | 158 km 98.2 mi | 52.1473°N 117.4416°W |
| 200 | Mount King George | Yukon | Saint Elias Mountains | 3741 m 12,274 ft | 1281 m 4,203 ft | 11.3 km 7.02 mi | 60.5314°N 139.7841°W |
| 202 | Mount Johansen | Yukon | Saint Elias Mountains | 3740 m 12,270 ft | 560 m 1,837 ft | 20 km 12.43 mi | 60.6832°N 140.6823°W |
| 203 | Trout Peak (Note: The summit of Trout Peak is the highest point of the central Absaroka Range.) | Wyoming | Absaroka Range | 3733.7 m 12,250 ft | 1129 m 3,704 ft | 45.7 km 28.4 mi | 44.6012°N 109.5253°W |
| 204 | North Twin Peak (Note: North Twin Peak is the easternmost summit of its elevation in Canada.) | Alberta | Canadian Rockies | 3733 m 12,247 ft | 743 m 2,438 ft | 8.52 km 5.29 mi | 52.2238°N 117.4345°W |
| 205 | Mount Huntington | Alaska | Alaska Range | 3731 m 12,240 ft | 881 m 2,890 ft | 6.24 km 3.88 mi | 62.9677°N 150.8996°W |
| 206 | Cerro San Rafael (Note: The summit of Cerro San Rafael is the highest point of Sierra Madre Oriental and Estado Libre y Soberano de Coahuila.) (Note: Cerro San Rafael is the northernmost summit of its elevation in México.) | Coahuila | Sierra Madre Oriental | 3730 m 12,238 ft | 1410 m 4,626 ft | 628 km 390 mi | 25.3637°N 100.5571°W |
| 207 | Mount Huxley | Alaska | Saint Elias Mountains | 3723 m 12,216 ft | 630 m 2,066 ft | 8.84 km 5.49 mi | 60.3279°N 141.1554°W |
| 208 | Cerro El Potosí (Note: The summit of Cerro El Potosí is the highest point of Estado Libre y Soberano de Nuevo León.) | Nuevo León | Sierra Madre Oriental | 3720 m 12,205 ft | 1875 m 6,152 ft | 571 km 355 mi | 24.8719°N 100.2327°W |
| 209 | Diamond Peak (Note: The summit of Diamond Peak is the highest point of the Lemhi Range.) | Idaho | Lemhi Range | 3719.3 m 12,202 ft | 1642 m 5,387 ft | 51.2 km 31.8 mi | 44.1414°N 113.0827°W |
| 210 | Mount Jordan | Alaska | Saint Elias Mountains | 3716 m 12,190 ft | 713 m 2,340 ft | 11.4 km 7.08 mi | 61.3987°N 141.4700°W |
| 211 | Mount Zirkel (Note: The summit of Mount Zirkel is the highest point of the Park Range.) (Note: The elevation of Mount Zirkel includes an adjustment of +1.632 m (5.35 ft) from NGVD 29 to NAVD 88.) | Colorado | Park Range | 3714 m 12,185 ft | 1058 m 3,470 ft | 60.6 km 37.7 mi | 40.8313°N 106.6631°W |
| 212 | Delano Peak (Note: The summit of Delano Peak is the highest point of the Tushar Mountains.) | Utah | Tushar Mountains | 3710.7 m 12,174 ft | 1435 m 4,709 ft | 180.5 km 112.1 mi | 38.3692°N 112.3714°W |
| 213 | Cerro el Nacimiento (Note: The summit of Cerro el Nacimiento is the highest point of Sierra Madre del Sur and Estado Libre y Soberano de Oaxaca.) | Oaxaca | Sierra Madre del Sur | 3710 m 12,172 ft | 2140 m 7,021 ft | 329 km 205 mi | 16.2115°N 96.1967°W |
| 214 | Mount Salisbury | Alaska | Saint Elias Mountains | 3709 m 12,170 ft | 1225 m 4,020 ft | 4.9 km 3.04 mi | 58.8505°N 137.3719°W |
| 215 | Crested Butte (Note: The elevation of Crested Butte includes an adjustment of +1.94 m (6.36 ft) from NGVD 29 to NAVD 88.) | Colorado | Elk Mountains | 3709 m 12,168 ft | 787 m 2,582 ft | 7.49 km 4.65 mi | 38.8835°N 106.9436°W |
| 216 | Younts Peak | Wyoming | Absaroka Range | 3708.3 m 12,166 ft | 683 m 2,241 ft | 20.4 km 12.7 mi | 43.9820°N 109.8665°W |
| 217 | Sawtooth Mountain | Colorado | La Garita Mountains | 3704.2 m 12,153 ft | 587 m 1,927 ft | 26.9 km 16.73 mi | 38.2740°N 106.8670°W |
| 218 | Olancha Peak (Note: The summit of Olancha Peak is the highest point of the southern Sierra Nevada.) | California | Sierra Nevada | 3697.8 m 12,132 ft | 946 m 3,103 ft | 23.9 km 14.84 mi | 36.2652°N 118.1182°W |
| 219 | Mount Mather | Alaska | Alaska Range | 3695 m 12,123 ft | 876 m 2,873 ft | 14.92 km 9.27 mi | 63.1946°N 150.4362°W |
| 220 | Gunnbjørn Fjeld (Note: The summit of Gunnbjørn Fjeld is the highest point of the Island of Greenland, Kalaallit Nunaat, the Kingdom of Denmark, and the entire Arctic.) (Note: Gunnbjørn Fjeld is the highest summit in North America east of the Mississippi River.) | Greenland | Island of Greenland | 3694 m 12,119 ft | 3694 m 12,119 ft | 3,254 km 2,022 mi | 68.9184°N 29.8991°W |
| 221 | Park Cone (Note: The elevation of Park Cone includes an adjustment of +1.873 m (6.15 ft) from NGVD 29 to NAVD 88.) | Colorado | Sawatch Range | 3690 m 12,106 ft | 622 m 2,040 ft | 5.53 km 3.44 mi | 38.7967°N 106.6028°W |
| 222 | Ibapah Peak (Note: The summit of Ibapah Peak is the highest point of the Deep Creek Range.) (Note: The elevation of Ibapah Peak includes an adjustment of +1.517 m (4.98 ft) from NGVD 29 to NAVD 88.) | Utah | Deep Creek Range | 3686 m 12,092 ft | 1605 m 5,267 ft | 98.5 km 61.2 mi | 39.8282°N 113.9200°W |
| 223 | Carbon Peak | Colorado | West Elk Mountains | 3684.3 m 12,088 ft | 664 m 2,179 ft | 6.31 km 3.92 mi | 38.7943°N 107.0431°W |
| 224 | Glover Peak (Note: The elevation of Glover Peak includes an adjustment of +1.609 m (5.28 ft) from NGVD 29 to NAVD 88.) | Wyoming | Wind River Range | 3680 m 12,072 ft | 520 m 1,706 ft | 4 km 2.49 mi | 43.1589°N 109.7656°W |
| 225 | Mount Moriah | Nevada | Snake Range | 3679.6 m 12,072 ft | 1496 m 4,909 ft | 32.7 km 20.3 mi | 39.2732°N 114.1988°W |
| 226 | Mount Guero | Colorado | West Elk Mountains | 3675.4 m 12,058 ft | 741 m 2,432 ft | 10.27 km 6.38 mi | 38.7196°N 107.3861°W |
| 227 | Siris Peak | Alaska | Saint Elias Mountains | 3673 m 12,050 ft | 792 m 2,600 ft | 25.8 km 16.05 mi | 60.7340°N 141.0138°W |
| 228 | Red Table Mountain | Colorado | Sawatch Range | 3670.7 m 12,043 ft | 615 m 2,017 ft | 12.68 km 7.88 mi | 39.4181°N 106.7712°W |
| 229 | Chalk Benchmark | Colorado | San Juan Mountains | 3669.3 m 12,038 ft | 601 m 1,971 ft | 11.68 km 7.26 mi | 37.1418°N 106.7500°W |
| 230 | Mount Clemenceau (Note: The summit of Mount Clemenceau is the highest point of the Clémenceau Icefield.) | British Columbia | Canadian Rockies | 3664 m 12,021 ft | 1494 m 4,902 ft | 35.9 km 22.3 mi | 52.2475°N 117.9578°W |
| 231 | Medicine Bow Peak (Note: The summit of Medicine Bow Peak is the highest point of the Snowy Range.) | Wyoming | Medicine Bow Mountains | 3662.4 m 12,016 ft | 988 m 3,243 ft | 65.4 km 40.6 mi | 41.3603°N 106.3176°W |
| 232 | Mount Witherspoon | Alaska | Chugach Mountains | 3661 m 12,012 ft | 659 m 2,162 ft | 9.63 km 5.98 mi | 61.3954°N 147.2010°W |
| 233 | Mount Zwischen (Note: The elevation of Mount Zwischen includes an adjustment of +1.481 m (4.86 ft) from NGVD 29 to NAVD 88.) | Colorado | Sangre de Cristo Mountains | 3661 m 12,011 ft | 691 m 2,266 ft | 7.14 km 4.44 mi | 37.7913°N 105.4554°W |
| 234 | Mount Drum | Alaska | Wrangell Mountains | 3661 m 12,010 ft | 2060 m 6,760 ft | 28.5 km 17.73 mi | 62.1159°N 144.6394°W |
| 235 | Little Cone | Colorado | San Miguel Mountains | 3654 m 11,988 ft | 561 m 1,840 ft | 8.35 km 5.19 mi | 37.9275°N 108.0908°W |
| 236 | Sierra Blanca Peak (Note: The summit of Sierra Blanca Peak is the highest point of the Sacramento Mountains.) | New Mexico | Sacramento Mountains | 3651.8 m 11,981 ft | 1693 m 5,553 ft | 267 km 165.7 mi | 33.3743°N 105.8087°W |
| 237 | Mount Hope | Alaska | Saint Elias Mountains | 3642 m 11,950 ft | 610 m 2,000 ft | 4.25 km 2.64 mi | 60.7039°N 141.0614°W |
| 238 | Mount Jefferson (Note: The summit of Mount Jefferson is the highest point of the Toquima Range.) (Note: The elevation of Mount Jefferson includes an adjustment of +1.666 m (5.47 ft) from NGVD 29 to NAVD 88.) | Nevada | Toquima Range | 3641 m 11,946 ft | 1789 m 5,871 ft | 158.7 km 98.6 mi | 38.7519°N 116.9267°W |
| 239 | Hess Mountain (Note: Hess Mountain is the northernmost 3000-meter (9843-foot) summit of Alaska and the United States.) | Alaska | Alaska Range | 3639 m 11,940 ft | 759 m 2,490 ft | 4.47 km 2.78 mi | 63.6382°N 147.1482°W |
| 239 | Mount Brooks | Alaska | Alaska Range | 3639 m 11,940 ft | 546 m 1,790 ft | 8.09 km 5.03 mi | 63.1875°N 150.6479°W |
| 241 | Cerro Vista (Note: The summit of Cerro Vista is the highest point of the southern Sangre de Cristo Range.) | New Mexico | Sangre de Cristo Mountains | 3638.3 m 11,937 ft | 768 m 2,519 ft | 22.8 km 14.19 mi | 36.2353°N 105.4108°W |
| 242 | Mount Nebo (Note: The summit of Mount Nebo is the highest point of the Wasatch Range.) (Note: The elevation of Mount Nebo includes an adjustment of +1.395 m (4.58 ft) from NGVD 29 to NAVD 88.) | Utah | Wasatch Range | 3637 m 11,933 ft | 1679 m 5,508 ft | 121.6 km 75.6 mi | 39.8219°N 111.7603°W |
| 243 | The Grand Parapet | Alaska | Saint Elias Mountains | 3636 m 11,930 ft | 664 m 2,180 ft | 8.47 km 5.26 mi | 61.4103°N 142.0266°W |
| 244 | Lituya Mountain | Alaska | Saint Elias Mountains | 3634 m 11,924 ft | 1120 m 3,674 ft | 6.27 km 3.9 mi | 58.8054°N 137.4367°W |
| 244 | Haydon Peak | Alaska | Saint Elias Mountains | 3634 m 11,924 ft | 510 m 1,674 ft | 4.78 km 2.97 mi | 60.2606°N 140.9881°W |
| 246 | Charleston Peak (Note: The summit of Charleston Peak is the highest point of the Spring Mountains.) (Mount Charleston) | Nevada | Spring Mountains | 3632 m 11,916 ft | 2517 m 8,258 ft | 218 km 135.1 mi | 36.2716°N 115.6956°W |
| 247 | Mount Donna | Alaska | Saint Elias Mountains | 3632 m 11,915 ft | 812 m 2,665 ft | 10.67 km 6.63 mi | 61.1341°N 141.3509°W |
| 248 | North Schell Peak (Note: The summit of North Schell Peak is the highest point of the Schell Creek Range.) | Nevada | Schell Creek Range | 3625.6 m 11,895 ft | 1650 m 5,413 ft | 37.9 km 23.5 mi | 39.4132°N 114.5997°W |
| 249 | Mount Alberta (Note: The summit of Mount Alberta is the highest point of the Winston Churchill Range.) | Alberta | Canadian Rockies | 3620 m 11,877 ft | 800 m 2,625 ft | 6.86 km 4.26 mi | 52.2850°N 117.4772°W |
| 250 | Mount Forbes (Note: The summit of Mount Forbes is the highest point of the entire Hudson Bay drainage basin.) (Note: Mount Forbes is the easternmost summit of its elevation in Canada.) | Alberta | Canadian Rockies | 3617 m 11,867 ft | 1649 m 5,410 ft | 47.4 km 29.5 mi | 51.8600°N 116.9316°W |
| 251 | Mount Assiniboine (Note: Mount Assiniboine is the southernmost and easternmost summit of its elevation in Canada.) | Alberta; British Columbia | Canadian Rockies | 3616 m 11,864 ft | 2082 m 6,831 ft | 141.8 km 88.1 mi | 50.8696°N 115.6509°W |
| 252 | Huntsman Ridge (Note: The elevation of Huntsman Ridge includes an adjustment of +1.711 m (5.61 ft) from NGVD 29 to NAVD 88.) (Dutch Peak) | Colorado | Elk Mountains | 3614 m 11,858 ft | 936 m 3,072 ft | 16.58 km 10.3 mi | 39.1920°N 107.3668°W |
| 253 | Sheep Mountain | Colorado | Rabbit Ears Range | 3604.2 m 11,825 ft | 546 m 1,792 ft | 11.53 km 7.16 mi | 40.3610°N 106.2658°W |
| 254 | Castle Peak (Note: The summit of Castle Peak is the highest point of the White Cloud Mountains.) | Idaho | White Cloud Mountains | 3600.4 m 11,812 ft | 1230 m 4,035 ft | 44 km 27.3 mi | 44.0402°N 114.5887°W |
| 255 | Arc Dome (Note: The summit of Arc Dome is the highest point of the Toiyabe Range.) (Note: The elevation of Arc Dome includes an adjustment of +1.665 m (5.46 ft) from NGVD 29 to NAVD 88.) | Nevada | Toiyabe Range | 3590 m 11,778 ft | 1595 m 5,233 ft | 37.2 km 23.1 mi | 38.8327°N 117.3531°W |
| 256 | Mount Timpanogos (Note: The summit of Mount Timpanogos is the highest point of the central Wasatch Range.) | Utah | Wasatch Range | 3582 m 11,752 ft | 1609 m 5,279 ft | 63.8 km 39.6 mi | 40.3908°N 111.6459°W |
| 257 | Waugh Mountain (Note: The summit of Waugh Mountain is the highest point of the South Park Hills.) (Note: The elevation of Waugh Mountain includes an adjustment of +1.702 m (5.58 ft) from NGVD 29 to NAVD 88.) | Colorado | South Park Hills | 3571 m 11,716 ft | 710 m 2,330 ft | 30.4 km 18.86 mi | 38.6022°N 105.6955°W |
| 258 | Coal Mountain (Note: The elevation of Coal Mountain includes an adjustment of +1.625 m (5.33 ft) from NGVD 29 to NAVD 88.) | Colorado | West Elk Mountains | 3569 m 11,710 ft | 523 m 1,715 ft | 9.22 km 5.73 mi | 38.7870°N 107.4837°W |
| 259 | Mount Goodsir (Note: The summit of Mount Goodsir is the highest point of the Ottertail Range.) | British Columbia | Canadian Rockies | 3567 m 11,703 ft | 1917 m 6,289 ft | 64.1 km 39.8 mi | 51.2021°N 116.3975°W |
| 260 | Mount Patterson (Note: The summit of Mount Patterson is the highest point of the Sweetwater Range.) (Note: The elevation of Mount Patterson includes an adjustment of +1.734 m (5.69 ft) from NGVD 29 to NAVD 88.) | California | Sweetwater Range | 3560 m 11,679 ft | 1272 m 4,173 ft | 29.8 km 18.5 mi | 38.4366°N 119.3052°W |
| 261 | Mount Russell (Note: Mount Russell is the westernmost summit of its elevation in Alaska and greater North America.) | Alaska | Alaska Range | 3557 m 11,670 ft | 1682 m 5,520 ft | 22.7 km 14.07 mi | 62.7984°N 151.8845°W |
| 262 | Monarch Mountain (Note: The summit of Monarch Mountain is the highest point of the Monarch Icefield.) | British Columbia | Coast Mountains | 3555 m 11,663 ft | 2925 m 9,596 ft | 71.4 km 44.4 mi | 51.8995°N 125.8760°W |
| 263 | Black Mountain (Note: The elevation of Black Mountain includes an adjustment of +1.631 m (5.35 ft) from NGVD 29 to NAVD 88.) | Colorado | South Park Hills | 3554 m 11,659 ft | 681 m 2,234 ft | 12.92 km 8.03 mi | 38.7185°N 105.6874°W |
| 264 | Cerro Teotepec (Note: The summit of Cerro Teotepec is the highest point of Estado Libre y Soberano de Guerrero.) | Guerrero | Sierra Madre del Sur | 3550 m 11,647 ft | 2180 m 7,152 ft | 185 km 114.9 mi | 17.4682°N 100.1364°W |
| 264 | Picacho San Onofre (Sierra Peña Nevada) | Nuevo León | Sierra Madre Oriental | 3550 m 11,647 ft | 1650 m 5,413 ft | 125 km 77.6 mi | 23.8007°N 99.8464°W |
| 266 | Williams Peak | Colorado | Front Range | 3541.8 m 11,620 ft | 625 m 2,049 ft | 13.93 km 8.66 mi | 39.8552°N 106.1854°W |
| 267 | Mount Temple (Note: The summit of Mount Temple is the highest point of the Bow Range.) | Alberta | Canadian Rockies | 3540 m 11,614 ft | 1530 m 5,020 ft | 21.3 km 13.22 mi | 51.3511°N 116.2063°W |
| 268 | Volcán Atitlán | Guatemala | Sierra Madre de Chiapas | 3537 m 11,604 ft | 1754 m 5,755 ft | 33.2 km 20.6 mi | 14.5834°N 91.1864°W |
| 269 | Puma Peak (Note: The elevation of Puma Peak includes an adjustment of +1.513 m (4.96 ft) from NGVD 29 to NAVD 88.) | Colorado | South Park Hills | 3528 m 11,575 ft | 689 m 2,260 ft | 11.44 km 7.11 mi | 39.1572°N 105.5815°W |
| 270 | Mount Mestas (Note: The elevation of Mount Mestas includes an adjustment of +1.372 m (4.5 ft) from NGVD 29 to NAVD 88.) | Colorado | Sangre de Cristo Mountains | 3528 m 11,574 ft | 679 m 2,229 ft | 23.3 km 14.47 mi | 37.5830°N 105.1474°W |
| 271 | Mount Brazeau | Alberta | Canadian Rockies | 3525 m 11,565 ft | 1475 m 4,839 ft | 30.8 km 19.14 mi | 52.5515°N 117.3549°W |
| 272 | Chicoma Mountain (Note: The summit of Chicoma Mountain is the highest point of the Jemez Mountains.) | New Mexico | Jemez Mountains | 3523.8 m 11,561 ft | 1308 m 4,291 ft | 56.8 km 35.3 mi | 36.0073°N 106.3846°W |
| 273 | Thirtynine Mile Mountain (Note: The elevation of Thirtynine Mile Mountain includes an adjustment of +1.584 m (5.2 ft) from NGVD 29 to NAVD 88.) | Colorado | South Park Hills | 3521 m 11,553 ft | 636 m 2,088 ft | 17.08 km 10.61 mi | 38.8324°N 105.5553°W |
| 274 | Mount Sir Sandford (Note: The summit of Mount Sir Sandford is the highest point of the Columbia Mountains.) | British Columbia | Columbia Mountains | 3519 m 11,545 ft | 2703 m 8,868 ft | 62 km 38.5 mi | 51.6566°N 117.8676°W |
| 275 | Montañas Peña Blanca | Guatemala | Sierra Madre de Chiapas | 3518 m 11,542 ft | 1858 m 6,096 ft | 39.8 km 24.7 mi | 15.4996°N 91.9151°W |
| 276 | Mount Sir Wilfrid Laurier (Note: The summit of Mount Sir Wilfrid Laurier is the highest point of the Cariboo Mountains.) | British Columbia | Columbia Mountains | 3516 m 11,535 ft | 2728 m 8,950 ft | 51.7 km 32.1 mi | 52.8015°N 119.7315°W |
| 277 | Mount Ellen (Note: The summit of Mount Ellen is the highest point of the Henry Mountains.) (Note: The elevation of Mount Ellen includes an adjustment of +1.486 m (4.88 ft) from NGVD 29 to NAVD 88.) | Utah | Henry Mountains | 3513 m 11,527 ft | 1787 m 5,862 ft | 90.2 km 56 mi | 38.1089°N 110.8136°W |
| 278 | Currant Mountain (Note: The summit of Currant Mountain is the highest point of the White Pine Range.) | Nevada | White Pine Range | 3510.7 m 11,518 ft | 1394 m 4,575 ft | 85 km 52.8 mi | 38.9097°N 115.4246°W |
| 279 | San Gorgonio Mountain (Note: The summit of San Gorgonio Mountain is the highest point of the San Bernardino Mountains.) (Note: The elevation of San Gorgonio Mountain includes an adjustment of +1.303 m (4.27 ft) from NGVD 29 to NAVD 88.) | California | San Bernardino Mountains | 3506 m 11,503 ft | 2528 m 8,294 ft | 262 km 162.5 mi | 34.0992°N 116.8249°W |
| 280 | Tomichi Dome (Note: The elevation of Tomichi Dome includes an adjustment of +1.693 m (5.55 ft) from NGVD 29 to NAVD 88.) | Colorado | Sawatch Range | 3496 m 11,471 ft | 709 m 2,325 ft | 15.04 km 9.35 mi | 38.4849°N 106.5291°W |
| 281 | Blair Mountain (Note: The summit of Blair Mountain is the highest point of the White River Plateau.) (Note: The elevation of Blair Mountain includes an adjustment of +1.565 m (5.13 ft) from NGVD 29 to NAVD 88.) | Colorado | White River Plateau | 3495 m 11,465 ft | 529 m 1,736 ft | 18.5 km 11.5 mi | 39.7943°N 107.4176°W |
| 282 | Mount Farnham (Note: The summit of Mount Farnham is the highest point of the Purcell Mountains.) (Note: Mount Farnham is the southernmost summit of its elevation in Canada.) | British Columbia | Columbia Mountains | 3493 m 11,460 ft | 2123 m 6,965 ft | 72.7 km 45.2 mi | 50.4888°N 116.4871°W |
| 283 | Twin Sisters Peaks (Note: The elevation of Twin Sisters Peaks includes an adjustment of +1.388 m (4.55 ft) from NGVD 29 to NAVD 88.) | Colorado | Front Range | 3485 m 11,433 ft | 700 m 2,298 ft | 6.48 km 4.03 mi | 40.2886°N 105.5175°W |
| 284 | Elk Mountain | Colorado | Rabbit Ears Range | 3482.1 m 11,424 ft | 658 m 2,159 ft | 16.93 km 10.52 mi | 40.1619°N 106.1285°W |
| 285 | Wyoming Peak (Note: The summit of Wyoming Peak is the highest point of the Wyoming Range.) | Wyoming | Wyoming Range | 3481.6 m 11,423 ft | 1084 m 3,558 ft | 81.8 km 50.8 mi | 42.6043°N 110.6238°W |
| 286 | Iron Mountain (Note: The elevation of Iron Mountain includes an adjustment of +1.436 m (4.71 ft) from NGVD 29 to NAVD 88.) | Colorado | Sangre de Cristo Range | 3480 m 11,416 ft | 595 m 1,951 ft | 11.18 km 6.95 mi | 37.6375°N 105.2538°W |
| 287 | Mount Torbert (Note: The summit of Mount Torbert is the highest point of the Tordrillo Mountains.) (Note: Mount Torbert is the westernmost summit of its elevation in Alaska and greater North America.) | Alaska | Alaska Range | 3479 m 11,413 ft | 2648 m 8,688 ft | 157.3 km 97.7 mi | 61.4086°N 152.4125°W |
| 288 | Mount Baldy (Note: The summit of Mount Baldy is the highest point of the White Mountains.) | Arizona | White Mountains | 3477.4 m 11,409 ft | 1441 m 4,728 ft | 248 km 154 mi | 33.9059°N 109.5626°W |
| 289 | Volcán Barú (Note: The summit of Volcán Barú is the highest point of the Republic of Panama.) (Note: Volcán Barú is the southernmost 3000-meter (9843-foot) summit of Central America and greater North America.) | Panama | Chiriquí | 3474 m 11,398 ft | 1324 m 4,344 ft | 74.2 km 46.1 mi | 8.8088°N 82.5427°W |
| 290 | Ruby Dome (Note: The summit of Ruby Dome is the highest point of the Ruby Mountains.) (Note: The elevation of Ruby Dome includes an adjustment of +1.429 m (4.69 ft) from NGVD 29 to NAVD 88.) | Nevada | Ruby Mountains | 3472 m 11,392 ft | 1466 m 4,810 ft | 152.5 km 94.7 mi | 40.6217°N 115.4754°W |
| 291 | Abajo Peak (Note: The summit of Abajo Peak is the highest point of the Abajo Mountains.) | Utah | Abajo Mountains | 3463 m 11,362 ft | 1388 m 4,555 ft | 64.2 km 39.9 mi | 37.8395°N 109.4624°W |
| 292 | Marcellina Mountain (Note: The elevation of Marcellina Mountain includes an adjustment of +1.658 m (5.44 ft) from NGVD 29 to NAVD 88.) | Colorado | West Elk Mountains | 3461 m 11,353 ft | 831 m 2,728 ft | 8.18 km 5.08 mi | 38.9299°N 107.2438°W |
| 293 | Crater Peak (Note: The summit of Crater Peak is the highest point of Grand Mesa.) | Colorado | Front Range | 3454.2 m 11,333 ft | 703 m 2,307 ft | 28.9 km 17.98 mi | 39.0396°N 107.6628°W |
| 294 | Hilgard Peak (Note: The summit of Hilgard Peak is the highest point of the Madison Range.) (Note: The elevation of Hilgard Peak includes an adjustment of +1.49 m (4.89 ft) from NGVD 29 to NAVD 88.) | Montana | Madison Range | 3451 m 11,321 ft | 1238 m 4,063 ft | 123 km 76.4 mi | 44.9166°N 111.4593°W |
| 295 | Cerro El Jabalín (Note: The summit of Cerro El Jabalín is the highest point of the Mexican Plateau.) | Coahuila | Mexican Plateau | 3450 m 11,319 ft | 1350 m 4,429 ft | 84.8 km 52.7 mi | 25.1899°N 101.3775°W |
| 296 | Brian Head (Note: The summit of Brian Head is the highest point of the Markagunt Plateau.) (Note: The elevation of Brian Head includes an adjustment of +1.556 m (5.1 ft) from NGVD 29 to NAVD 88.) | Utah | Markagunt Plateau | 3448 m 11,312 ft | 1148 m 3,767 ft | 68.5 km 42.5 mi | 37.6812°N 112.8312°W |
| 297 | Hole in the Mountain Peak (Note: The summit of Hole in the Mountain Peak is the highest point of the eastern Humboldt Range.) (Note: The elevation of Hole in the Mountain Peak includes an adjustment of +1.457 m (4.78 ft) from NGVD 29 to NAVD 88.) | Nevada | East Humboldt Range | 3448 m 11,311 ft | 1478 m 4,849 ft | 42.8 km 26.6 mi | 40.9508°N 115.1224°W |
| 298 | Mount Taylor (Note: The summit of Mount Taylor is the highest point of the northern San Mateo Mountains.) | New Mexico | San Mateo Mountains | 3445.9 m 11,305 ft | 1248 m 4,094 ft | 139.6 km 86.8 mi | 35.2387°N 107.6085°W |
| 299 | Castle Peak (Note: The elevation of Castle Peak includes an adjustment of +1.575 m (5.17 ft) from NGVD 29 to NAVD 88.) | Colorado | Sawatch Range | 3446 m 11,305 ft | 927 m 3,040 ft | 26.6 km 16.51 mi | 39.7723°N 106.8304°W |
| 300 | Troy Peak (Note: The summit of Troy Peak is the highest point of the Grant Range.) | Nevada | Grant Range | 3445 m 11,302 ft | 1460 m 4,790 ft | 64.3 km 40 mi | 38.3194°N 115.5019°W |
| 301 | South Tent Mountain (Note: The summit of South Tent Mountain is the highest point of the Wasatch Plateau.) | Utah | Wasatch Plateau | 3440.5 m 11,288 ft | 1032 m 3,385 ft | 57.5 km 35.8 mi | 39.3922°N 111.3576°W |
| 302 | Mount Joffre (Note: Mount Joffre is the easternmost summit of its elevation in Canada.) | Alberta; British Columbia | Canadian Rockies | 3433 m 11,263 ft | 1505 m 4,938 ft | 49.2 km 30.6 mi | 50.5285°N 115.2069°W |
| 303 | Volcán Irazú | Costa Rica | Cordillera Central, Costa Rica | 3432 m 11,260 ft | 1897 m 6,224 ft | 47.8 km 29.7 mi | 9.9764°N 83.8534°W |
| 304 | Mount Hood (Note: The summit of Mount Hood is the highest point of the Oregon Cascades and the U.S. State of Oregon.) | Oregon | Cascade Range | 3428.8 m 11,249 ft | 2349 m 7,706 ft | 92.2 km 57.3 mi | 45.3735°N 121.6959°W |
| 305 | Cerro Zempoaltépetl | Oaxaca | Sierra Madre de Oaxaca | 3420 m 11,220 ft | 1580 m 5,184 ft | 103.2 km 64.1 mi | 17.1324°N 96.0125°W |
| 306 | Crazy Peak (Note: The summit of Crazy Peak is the highest point of the Crazy Mountains.) (Note: The elevation of Crazy Peak includes an adjustment of +1.421 m (4.66 ft) from NGVD 29 to NAVD 88.) | Montana | Crazy Mountains | 3418 m 11,214 ft | 1743 m 5,719 ft | 71.8 km 44.6 mi | 46.0181°N 110.2768°W |
| 307 | Howser Spire | British Columbia | Columbia Mountains | 3412 m 11,194 ft | 1299 m 4,262 ft | 35.4 km 22 mi | 50.7296°N 116.8134°W |
| 308 | Mount Tom White | Alaska | Chugach Mountains | 3411 m 11,191 ft | 2329 m 7,641 ft | 117.6 km 73 mi | 60.6518°N 143.6972°W |
| 309 | Hardscrabble Mountain (Note: The elevation of Hardscrabble Mountain includes an adjustment of +1.612 m (5.29 ft) from NGVD 29 to NAVD 88.) | Colorado | Sawatch Range | 3405 m 11,171 ft | 520 m 1,706 ft | 11.31 km 7.03 mi | 39.5171°N 106.8021°W |
| 310 | Tweedy Mountain (Note: The summit of Tweedy Mountain is the highest point of the Pioneer Mountains.) (Note: The elevation of Tweedy Mountain includes an adjustment of +1.598 m (5.24 ft) from NGVD 29 to NAVD 88.) | Montana | Pioneer Mountains | 3401 m 11,159 ft | 1163 m 3,814 ft | 120.7 km 75 mi | 45.4805°N 112.9655°W |
| 311 | Whitehorn Mountain (Note: Whitehorn Mountain is the northernmost and westernmost summit of its elevation in the Rocky Mountains.) | British Columbia | Canadian Rockies | 3399 m 11,152 ft | 1747 m 5,732 ft | 7.94 km 4.93 mi | 53.1370°N 119.2667°W |
| 312 | Cochetopa Dome (Note: The elevation of Cochetopa Dome includes an adjustment of +1.804 m (5.92 ft) from NGVD 29 to NAVD 88.) | Colorado | La Garita Mountains | 3395 m 11,138 ft | 537 m 1,762 ft | 9.9 km 6.15 mi | 38.2267°N 106.7147°W |
| 313 | Mount Hector | Alberta | Canadian Rockies | 3394 m 11,135 ft | 1759 m 5,771 ft | 21.5 km 13.34 mi | 51.5752°N 116.2590°W |
| 314 | Waucoba Mountain (Note: The summit of Waucoba Mountain is the highest point of the Inyo Mountains.) | California | Inyo Mountains | 3391.8 m 11,128 ft | 1202 m 3,943 ft | 32.2 km 20 mi | 37.0220°N 118.0078°W |
| 314 | Glass Mountain (Note: The summit of Glass Mountain is the highest point of the Glass Mountain Ridge.) | California | Glass Mountain Ridge | 3391.8 m 11,128 ft | 978 m 3,210 ft | 26 km 16.16 mi | 37.7749°N 118.7085°W |
| 316 | North Mamm Peak | Colorado | Front Range | 3391.3 m 11,126 ft | 946 m 3,103 ft | 34.1 km 21.2 mi | 39.3865°N 107.8660°W |
| 317 | Mont Forel (Note: Mont Forel is the southernmost and westernmost summit of its elevation in Greenland.) | Greenland | Island of Greenland | 3391 m 11,125 ft | 1581 m 5,187 ft | 357 km 222 mi | 66.9354°N 36.7873°W |
| 318 | Keynot Peak (Note: The elevation of Keynot Peak includes an adjustment of +1.347 m (4.42 ft) from NGVD 29 to NAVD 88.) | California | Inyo Mountains | 3385 m 11,105 ft | 934 m 3,064 ft | 27.5 km 17.09 mi | 36.7076°N 117.9626°W |
| 319 | Mount Dawson | British Columbia | Columbia Mountains | 3377 m 11,079 ft | 2045 m 6,709 ft | 63.4 km 39.4 mi | 51.1516°N 117.4206°W |
| 320 | Cerro El Zamorano (Note: The summit of Cerro El Zamorano is the highest point of both Estado Libre y Soberano de Guanajuato and Estado Libre y Soberano de Querétaro.) | Querétaro; Guanajuato | Mexican Plateau | 3370 m 11,056 ft | 1450 m 4,757 ft | 104.8 km 65.1 mi | 20.9338°N 100.1805°W |
| 320 | Cerro la Muralla | Oaxaca | Sierra Madre del Sur | 3370 m 11,056 ft | 1430 m 4,692 ft | 175.7 km 109.2 mi | 17.1344°N 97.6640°W |
| 322 | Mount Foresta | Alaska | Saint Elias Mountains | 3368 m 11,050 ft | 1646 m 5,400 ft | 20.1 km 12.51 mi | 60.1912°N 139.4323°W |
| 323 | Telescope Peak (Note: The summit of Telescope Peak is the highest point of the Panamint Range.) | California | Panamint Range | 3366 m 11,043 ft | 1886 m 6,188 ft | 92 km 57.2 mi | 36.1698°N 117.0892°W |
| 324 | Mammoth Mountain (Note: The elevation of Mammoth Mountain includes an adjustment of +1.766 m (5.79 ft) from NGVD 29 to NAVD 88.) | California | Sierra Nevada | 3364 m 11,036 ft | 512 m 1,680 ft | 8.19 km 5.09 mi | 37.6305°N 119.0326°W |
| 325 | Deseret Peak (Note: The summit of Deseret Peak is the highest point of the Stansbury Mountains.) | Utah | Stansbury Mountains | 3364 m 11,035 ft | 1772 m 5,812 ft | 74 km 46 mi | 40.4595°N 112.6264°W |
| 326 | Mount Edith Cavell | Alberta | Canadian Rockies | 3363 m 11,033 ft | 2033 m 6,670 ft | 47.2 km 29.3 mi | 52.6672°N 118.0569°W |
| 327 | Mount Fryatt (Note: The summit of Mount Fryatt is the highest point of the Hooker Icefield.) | Alberta | Canadian Rockies | 3361 m 11,027 ft | 1608 m 5,276 ft | 16.37 km 10.17 mi | 52.5503°N 117.9104°W |
| 328 | Laramie Mountains High Point (Note: The elevation of Laramie Mountains High Point includes an adjustment of +1.415 m (4.64 ft) from NGVD 29 to NAVD 88.) | Colorado | Laramie Mountains | 3360 m 11,025 ft | 573 m 1,880 ft | 13.74 km 8.54 mi | 40.7704°N 105.7162°W |
| 329 | Mount Harrison (Note: Mount Harrison is the southernmost and easternmost 3000-meter (9843-foot) summit of Canada.) | British Columbia | Canadian Rockies | 3360 m 11,024 ft | 1770 m 5,807 ft | 52.1 km 32.4 mi | 50.0604°N 115.2057°W |
| 330 | Cerro Gordo (Note: The summit of Cerro Gordo is the highest point of the Sierra Madre Occidental and Estado Libre y Soberano de Durango.) (Note: Cerro Gordo is the westernmost summit of its elevation in México.) | Durango | Sierra Madre Occidental | 3357 m 11,014 ft | 1387 m 4,551 ft | 424 km 263 mi | 23.2060°N 104.9442°W |
| 331 | Ejnar Mikkelsen Fjeld (Note: Ejnar Mikkelsen Fjeld is the easternmost 3000-meter (9843-foot) summit of Greenland and greater North America.) | Greenland | Island of Greenland | 3325 m 10,909 ft | 1625 m 5,331 ft | 16.29 km 10.12 mi | 68.8957°N 28.6279°W |
| 332 | Freel Peak (Note: The summit of Freel Peak is the highest point of the Carson Range.) | California | Sierra Nevada | 3318 m 10,886 ft | 959 m 3,146 ft | 36.9 km 22.9 mi | 38.8575°N 119.9001°W |
| 333 | Sand Mountain North (Note: The summit of Sand Mountain North is the highest point of the Elkhead Mountains.) (Note: The elevation of Sand Mountain North includes an adjustment of +1.502 m (4.93 ft) from NGVD 29 to NAVD 88.) | Colorado | Elkhead Mountains | 3317 m 10,884 ft | 664 m 2,179 ft | 28.5 km 17.7 mi | 40.7636°N 107.0575°W |
| 334 | Mount Chown (Note: Mount Chown is the northernmost and westernmost summit of its elevation in the Rocky Mountains.) | Alberta | Canadian Rockies | 3316 m 10,879 ft | 1746 m 5,728 ft | 30.7 km 19.05 mi | 53.3971°N 119.4173°W |
| 335 | Mount Nelson | British Columbia | Columbia Mountains | 3313 m 10,869 ft | 523 m 1,716 ft | 7.22 km 4.49 mi | 50.4601°N 116.3515°W |
| 336 | Black Mountain (Note: The elevation of Black Mountain includes an adjustment of +1.537 m (5.04 ft) from NGVD 29 to NAVD 88.) | Colorado | Elkhead Mountains | 3312 m 10,865 ft | 744 m 2,440 ft | 26.4 km 16.4 mi | 40.7835°N 107.3691°W |
| 337 | Cerro Mohinora (Note: The summit of Cerro Mohinora is the highest point of Estado Libre y Soberano de Chihuahua.) (Note: Cerro Mohinora is the northernmost and westernmost summit of its elevation in México.) | Chihuahua | Sierra Madre Occidental | 3308 m 10,853 ft | 858 m 2,815 ft | 231 km 143.5 mi | 25.9560°N 107.0476°W |
| 338 | Sleepy Cat Peak (Note: The elevation of Sleepy Cat Peak includes an adjustment of +1.471 m (4.83 ft) from NGVD 29 to NAVD 88.) | Colorado | Flat Tops | 3308 m 10,853 ft | 716 m 2,348 ft | 17.13 km 10.64 mi | 40.1275°N 107.5338°W |
| 339 | Matterhorn (Note: The summit of Matterhorn is the highest point of the Jarbidge Mountains.) (Note: The elevation of Matterhorn includes an adjustment of +1.429 m (4.69 ft) from NGVD 29 to NAVD 88.) | Nevada | Jarbidge Mountains | 3305 m 10,843 ft | 1429 m 4,688 ft | 97.2 km 60.4 mi | 41.8107°N 115.3745°W |
| 340 | Spruce Mountain | Colorado | Grand Mesa | 3303.5 m 10,838 ft | 553 m 1,813 ft | 13.41 km 8.33 mi | 39.1973°N 107.5220°W |
| 341 | San Jacinto Peak (Note: The summit of San Jacinto Peak is the highest point of the San Jacinto Mountains.) | California | San Jacinto Mountains | 3302.3 m 10,834 ft | 2542 m 8,339 ft | 32.7 km 20.3 mi | 33.8147°N 116.6794°W |
| 342 | Mount Queen Bess (Note: The summit of Mount Queen Bess is the highest point of the Homathko Icefield.) | British Columbia | Coast Mountains | 3298 m 10,820 ft | 2355 m 7,726 ft | 45.5 km 28.2 mi | 51.2714°N 124.5682°W |
| 343 | West Goat Peak (Note: The summit of West Goat Peak is the highest point of the Anaconda Range.) (Note: The elevation of West Goat Peak includes an adjustment of +1.52 m (4.99 ft) from NGVD 29 to NAVD 88.) | Montana | Anaconda Range | 3291 m 10,798 ft | 1211 m 3,973 ft | 62.9 km 39.1 mi | 45.9625°N 113.3949°W |
| 344 | South Baldy (Note: The summit of South Baldy is the highest point of the Magdalena Mountains.) | New Mexico | Magdalena Mountains | 3288 m 10,787 ft | 1162 m 3,813 ft | 141.7 km 88.1 mi | 33.9910°N 107.1879°W |
| 345 | Mount Baker (Note: The summit of Mount Baker is the highest point of the northern Cascade Range.) (Note: The elevation of Mount Baker includes an adjustment of +1.43 m (4.69 ft) from NGVD 29 to NAVD 88.) | Washington | Skagit Range | 3287 m 10,786 ft | 2696 m 8,845 ft | 212 km 131.5 mi | 48.7768°N 121.8145°W |
| 346 | Mount Sir Donald (Note: The summit of Mount Sir Donald is the highest point of the Sir Donald Range.) | British Columbia | Selkirk Mountains | 3284 m 10,774 ft | 874 m 2,867 ft | 12.38 km 7.69 mi | 51.2631°N 117.4314°W |
| 347 | Thompson Peak (Note: The summit of Thompson Peak is the highest point of the Sawtooth Range.) | Idaho | Sawtooth Range | 3278.4 m 10,756 ft | 747 m 2,451 ft | 28.6 km 17.77 mi | 44.1415°N 115.0100°W |
| 348 | Mount Miller (Note: The summit of Mount Miller is the highest point of Barkley Ridge.) | Alaska | Chugach Mountains | 3277 m 10,750 ft | 1615 m 5,300 ft | 64.9 km 40.3 mi | 60.4605°N 142.3012°W |
| 349 | Mount Sir Alexander (Note: Mount Sir Alexander is the northernmost and westernmost 3000-meter (9843-foot) summit and ultra-prominent summit of the Rocky Mountains.) | British Columbia | Canadian Rockies | 3275 m 10,745 ft | 1762 m 5,781 ft | 87.8 km 54.5 mi | 53.9360°N 120.3869°W |
| 350 | Mount Monashee (Note: The summit of Mount Monashee is the highest point of the Monashee Mountains.) | British Columbia | Columbia Mountains | 3274 m 10,741 ft | 2404 m 7,887 ft | 51.8 km 32.2 mi | 52.3853°N 118.9399°W |
| 351 | Mount Graham (Note: The summit of Mount Graham is the highest point of the Pinaleño Mountains.) | Arizona | Pinaleño Mountains | 3268.6 m 10,724 ft | 1932 m 6,340 ft | 132.6 km 82.4 mi | 32.7017°N 109.8714°W |
| 352 | Pilot Peak (Note: The summit of Pilot Peak is the highest point of the Pilot Range.) | Nevada | Pilot Range | 3267.6 m 10,720 ft | 1747 m 5,731 ft | 86.4 km 53.7 mi | 41.0211°N 114.0774°W |
| 353 | Good Hope Mountain (Note: The summit of Good Hope Mountain is the highest point of the Bugaboos.) | British Columbia | Coast Mountains | 3242 m 10,636 ft | 1497 m 4,911 ft | 31.2 km 19.38 mi | 51.1425°N 124.1719°W |
| 354 | Homer Youngs Peak (Note: The summit of Homer Youngs Peak is the highest point of the West Big Hole Mountains.) (Note: The elevation of Homer Youngs Peak includes an adjustment of +1.483 m (4.87 ft) from NGVD 29 to NAVD 88.) | Montana | Bitterroot Range | 3239 m 10,626 ft | 976 m 3,201 ft | 57.2 km 35.5 mi | 45.3111°N 113.6773°W |
| 355 | Flat Top Mountain (Note: The summit of Flat Top Mountain is the highest point of the Oquirrh Mountains.) (Note: The elevation of Flat Top Mountain includes an adjustment of +1.329 m (4.36 ft) from NGVD 29 to NAVD 88.) | Utah | Oquirrh Mountains | 3238 m 10,624 ft | 1641 m 5,383 ft | 38.4 km 23.8 mi | 40.3724°N 112.1888°W |
| 356 | Greenland Ice Sheet High Point (Note: The apex of the Greenland Ice Sheet is the northernmost 3000-meter (9843-foot) summit of Greenland and greater North America.) | Greenland | Island of Greenland | 3238 m 10,623 ft | 500 m 1,640 ft | 476 km 296 mi | 72.4667°N 37.1000°W |
| 357 | Hollowtop Mountain (Note: The summit of Hollowtop Mountain is the highest point of the Tobacco Root Mountains.) (Note: The elevation of Hollowtop Mountain includes an adjustment of +1.486 m (4.88 ft) from NGVD 29 to NAVD 88.) | Montana | Tobacco Root Mountains | 3234 m 10,609 ft | 1190 m 3,904 ft | 54.8 km 34 mi | 45.6116°N 112.0083°W |
| 358 | Sunset Peak (Note: The summit of Sunset Peak is the highest point of the Snowcrest Range.) (Note: The elevation of Sunset Peak includes an adjustment of +1.553 m (5.1 ft) from NGVD 29 to NAVD 88.) | Montana | Snowcrest Range | 3227 m 10,586 ft | 1146 m 3,761 ft | 50.3 km 31.2 mi | 44.8559°N 112.1468°W |
| 359 | Glacier Peak (Note: The elevation of Glacier Peak includes an adjustment of +1.492 m (4.9 ft) from NGVD 29 to NAVD 88.) | Washington | Cascade Range | 3214 m 10,545 ft | 2291 m 7,518 ft | 90.2 km 56 mi | 48.1125°N 121.1138°W |
| 360 | Mount Steller (Note: The summit of Mount Steller is the highest point of Waxell Ridge.) | Alaska | Chugach Mountains | 3205 m 10,515 ft | 1635 m 5,365 ft | 36.2 km 22.5 mi | 60.5199°N 143.0932°W |
| 361 | Mount Jefferson (Note: The elevation of Mount Jefferson includes an adjustment of +1.388 m (4.55 ft) from NGVD 29 to NAVD 88.) | Oregon | Cascade Range | 3201 m 10,502 ft | 1767 m 5,797 ft | 77.5 km 48.1 mi | 44.6743°N 121.7996°W |
| 362 | Cerro El Refugio (Note: The summit of Cerro El Refugio is the highest point of Estado Libre y Soberano de Zacatecas.) | Zacatecas; Coahuila | Mexican Plateau | 3200 m 10,499 ft | 500 m 1,640 ft | 73.4 km 45.6 mi | 24.5761°N 101.1047°W |
| 362 | Mount Ida (Note: Mount Ida is the northernmost 3000-meter (9843-foot) summit and ultra-prominent summit of the Rocky Mountains.) | British Columbia | Canadian Rockies | 3200 m 10,499 ft | 1530 m 5,020 ft | 14.14 km 8.79 mi | 54.0580°N 120.3268°W |
| 364 | Mount Cleveland (Note: The summit of Mount Cleveland is the highest point of the Lewis Range.) | Montana | Lewis Range | 3194 m 10,479 ft | 1599 m 5,246 ft | 159.9 km 99.4 mi | 48.9249°N 113.8482°W |
| 365 | Cerro Grande (Note: The summit of Cerro Grande is the highest point of Estado Libre y Soberano de San Luis Potosí.) | San Luis Potosí | Mexican Plateau | 3190 m 10,466 ft | 500 m 1,640 ft | 103.1 km 64.1 mi | 23.6667°N 100.8873°W |
| 366 | Lassen Peak | California | Cascade Range | 3188.7 m 10,462 ft | 1594 m 5,229 ft | 114.9 km 71.4 mi | 40.4882°N 121.5050°W |
| 367 | Razorback Mountain (Note: The summit of Razorback Mountain is the highest point of the Niut Range.) | British Columbia | Coast Mountains | 3183 m 10,443 ft | 2153 m 7,064 ft | 36.5 km 22.7 mi | 51.5905°N 124.6912°W |
| 368 | Monmouth Mountain (Note: The summit of Monmouth Mountain is the highest point of the Lillooet Icefield.) (Mount Monmouth) | British Columbia | Coast Mountains | 3182 m 10,440 ft | 1602 m 5,256 ft | 31.6 km 19.6 mi | 50.9924°N 123.7900°W |
| 369 | Green Mountain | Colorado | Kenosha Mountains | 3178.3 m 10,427 ft | 567 m 1,859 ft | 6.72 km 4.18 mi | 39.3053°N 105.3001°W |
| 370 | South Sister | Oregon | Cascade Range | 3158.5 m 10,363 ft | 1705 m 5,593 ft | 63.4 km 39.4 mi | 44.1035°N 121.7693°W |
| 371 | Mount Kimball (Note: The summit of Mount Kimball is the highest point of the Delta Range.) | Alaska | Alaska Range | 3155 m 10,350 ft | 2263 m 7,425 ft | 89.8 km 55.8 mi | 63.2390°N 144.6419°W |
| 371 | Mount Seattle | Alaska | Saint Elias Mountains | 3155 m 10,350 ft | 1695 m 5,561 ft | 19.26 km 11.97 mi | 60.0680°N 139.1893°W |
| 373 | Navajo Mountain | Utah | Colorado Plateau | 3154.2 m 10,348 ft | 1291 m 4,236 ft | 94.3 km 58.6 mi | 37.0343°N 110.8697°W |
| 374 | Cache Peak (Note: The summit of Cache Peak is the highest point of the Albion Range.) | Idaho | Albion Range | 3152.5 m 10,343 ft | 1365 m 4,479 ft | 131.6 km 81.8 mi | 42.1856°N 113.6611°W |
| 375 | Laramie Peak | Wyoming | Laramie Mountains | 3132 m 10,276 ft | 1011 m 3,317 ft | 108.4 km 67.4 mi | 42.2681°N 105.4425°W |
| 376 | Columbus Mountain (Note: The elevation of Columbus Mountain includes an adjustment of +1.378 m (4.52 ft) from NGVD 29 to NAVD 88.) | Colorado | Elkhead Mountains | 3126 m 10,258 ft | 583 m 1,913 ft | 12.36 km 7.68 mi | 40.8799°N 107.1921°W |
| 377 | Cerro El Centinela | Coahuila | Mexican Plateau | 3122 m 10,243 ft | 1657 m 5,436 ft | 186.9 km 116.1 mi | 25.1359°N 103.2304°W |
| 378 | Table Mountain (Note: The summit of Table Mountain is the highest point of the Highland Mountains.) (Note: The elevation of Table Mountain includes an adjustment of +1.467 m (4.81 ft) from NGVD 29 to NAVD 88.) | Montana | Highland Mountains | 3117 m 10,228 ft | 1348 m 4,422 ft | 31.1 km 19.3 mi | 45.7426°N 112.4619°W |
| 379 | Redoubt Volcano (Note: The summit of Redoubt Volcano is the highest point of the Chigmit Mountains.) (Note: Redoubt Volcano is the westernmost summit of its elevation in Alaska and greater North America.) | Alaska | Chigmit Mountains | 3108 m 10,197 ft | 2788 m 9,147 ft | 94.5 km 58.7 mi | 60.4854°N 152.7442°W |
| 380 | Mount Regan (Idaho) (Note: The elevation of Mount Regan (Idaho) includes an adjustment of +1.587 m (5.21 ft) from NGVD 29 to NAVD 88.) | Idaho | Sawtooth Range | 3108 m 10,195 ft | 527 m 1,730 ft | 3.06 km 1.9 mi | 44.1598°N 115.0616°W |
| 381 | Pico Duarte (Note: The summit of Pico Duarte is the highest point of the Dominican Republic, the Island of Hispaniola, and all islands of the Caribbean Sea.) | Dominican Republic | Island of Hispaniola | 3098 m 10,164 ft | 3098 m 10,164 ft | 941 km 584 mi | 19.0231°N 70.9977°W |
| 382 | Trapper Peak (Note: The summit of Trapper Peak is the highest point of the central Bitterroot Range.) (Note: The elevation of Trapper Peak includes an adjustment of +1.367 m (4.48 ft) from NGVD 29 to NAVD 88.) | Montana | Bitterroot Range | 3097 m 10,162 ft | 1088 m 3,570 ft | 65.6 km 40.8 mi | 45.8898°N 114.2978°W |
| 383 | Picacho del Diablo (Note: The summit of Picacho del Diablo is the highest point of Sierra de San Pedro Mártir and the Baja California Peninsula.) (Note: Picacho del Diablo is the northernmost and westernmost 3000-meter (9843-foot) summit and ultra-prominent summit of México.) | Baja California | Sierra de San Pedro Mártir | 3095 m 10,154 ft | 2125 m 6,972 ft | 335 km 208 mi | 30.9925°N 115.3753°W |
| 384 | Mount Cooper (Note: The summit of Mount Cooper is the highest point of the Goat Range.) | British Columbia | Columbia Mountains | 3094 m 10,151 ft | 2319 m 7,608 ft | 42.5 km 26.4 mi | 50.1797°N 117.1992°W |
| 385 | Mount Stimson | Montana | Lewis Range | 3092.6 m 10,146 ft | 1342 m 4,402 ft | 48.3 km 30 mi | 48.5142°N 113.6104°W |
| 386 | Mount Ratz (Note: The summit of Mount Ratz is the highest point of the Boundary Ranges.) | British Columbia | Coast Mountains | 3090 m 10,138 ft | 2430 m 7,972 ft | 311 km 193.4 mi | 57.3930°N 132.3031°W |
| 387 | Jeanette Peak | British Columbia | Canadian Rockies | 3089 m 10,135 ft | 1657 m 5,436 ft | 17.54 km 10.9 mi | 52.6357°N 118.6166°W |
| 388 | Kintla Peak (Note: The summit of Kintla Peak is the highest point of the Livingston Range.) (Note: The elevation of Kintla Peak includes an adjustment of +1.413 m (4.64 ft) from NGVD 29 to NAVD 88.) | Montana | Livingston Range | 3080 m 10,106 ft | 1341 m 4,401 ft | 23.8 km 14.78 mi | 48.9437°N 114.1714°W |
| 389 | Ferris Mountain (Note: The summit of Ferris Mountain is the highest point of the Ferris Mountains.) | Wyoming | Ferris Mountains | 3069.6 m 10,071 ft | 1000 m 3,282 ft | 89 km 55.3 mi | 42.2566°N 107.2394°W |
| 390 | Mount San Antonio (Note: The summit of Mount San Antonio is the highest point of the San Gabriel Mountains.) (Note: The elevation of Mount San Antonio includes an adjustment of +1.214 m (3.98 ft) from NGVD 29 to NAVD 88.) | California | San Gabriel Mountains | 3069 m 10,068 ft | 1903 m 6,244 ft | 68.4 km 42.5 mi | 34.2891°N 117.6463°W |
| 391 | Mount Tatlow | British Columbia | Coast Mountains | 3063 m 10,049 ft | 1613 m 5,292 ft | 34.4 km 21.4 mi | 51.3843°N 123.8641°W |
| 392 | Iliamna Volcano (Note: Iliamna Volcano is the westernmost 3000-meter (9843-foot) summit of Alaska and greater North America.) | Alaska | Chigmit Mountains | 3053 m 10,016 ft | 2398 m 7,866 ft | 54.1 km 33.6 mi | 60.0321°N 153.0915°W |
| 392 | Kates Needle | Alaska; British Columbia | Coast Mountains | 3053 m 10,016 ft | 1383 m 4,537 ft | 41.8 km 26 mi | 57.0449°N 132.0451°W |
| 394 | Ute Peak (Note: The summit of Ute Peak is the highest point of Ute Mountain.) | Colorado | Ute Mountain | 3043 m 9,984 ft | 1231 m 4,039 ft | 55.2 km 34.3 mi | 37.2841°N 108.7787°W |
| 394 | Naomi Peak (Note: The summit of Naomi Peak is the highest point of the Bear River Mountains.) | Utah | Wasatch Range | 3043 m 9,984 ft | 966 m 3,169 ft | 98.9 km 61.5 mi | 41.9114°N 111.6754°W |
| 396 | Talchako Mountain | British Columbia | Coast Mountains | 3037 m 9,964 ft | 1676 m 5,499 ft | 19.23 km 11.95 mi | 52.0919°N 126.0159°W |
| 397 | Horse Mountain (Note: The elevation of Horse Mountain includes an adjustment of +1.461 m (4.79 ft) from NGVD 29 to NAVD 88.) | Colorado | San Juan Mountains | 3033 m 9,952 ft | 575 m 1,887 ft | 21 km 13.06 mi | 37.3080°N 107.2864°W |
| 398 | Sierra la Madera | Coahuila | Mexican Plateau | 3030 m 9,941 ft | 1905 m 6,250 ft | 226 km 140.7 mi | 27.0345°N 102.3922°W |
| 398 | Sierra Fría (Note: The summit of Sierra Fría is the highest point of Estado Libre y Soberano de Aguascalientes.) | Aguascalientes | Sierra Madre Occidental | 3030 m 9,941 ft | 500 m 1,640 ft | 234 km 145.6 mi | 22.2739°N 102.6073°W |
| 400 | Hayford Peak (Note: The summit of Hayford Peak is the highest point of the Sheep Range.) | Nevada | Sheep Range | 3024.9 m 9,924 ft | 1650 m 5,412 ft | 54.3 km 33.8 mi | 36.6577°N 115.2008°W |
| 401 | Ulysses Mountain (Note: The summit of Ulysses Mountain is the highest point of the Far Northern Rockies.) (Note: Ulysses Mountain is the northernmost 3000-metre (9843-foot) summit of the Rocky Mountains.) (Mount Ulysses) | British Columbia | Muskwa Ranges | 3024 m 9,921 ft | 2294 m 7,526 ft | 436 km 271 mi | 57.3464°N 124.0928°W |
| 402 | Eagle Peak (Note: The summit of Eagle Peak is the highest point of the Warner Mountains.) | California | Warner Mountains | 3016 m 9,895 ft | 1330 m 4,362 ft | 140.6 km 87.4 mi | 41.2835°N 120.2007°W |
| 403 | Sacajawea Peak (Oregon) (Note: The summit of Sacajawea Peak (Oregon) is the highest point of the Wallowa Mountains and the Columbia Plateau.) (Note: The elevation of Sacajawea Peak (Oregon) includes an adjustment of +1.56 m (5.12 ft) from NGVD 29 to NAVD 88.) | Oregon | Wallowa Mountains | 3000 m 9,843 ft | 1949 m 6,393 ft | 202 km 125.5 mi | 45.2450°N 117.2929°W |

== Gallery ==
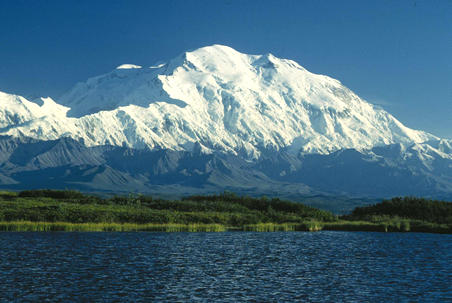
1. Denali in Alaska is the highest summit of the United States and North America.

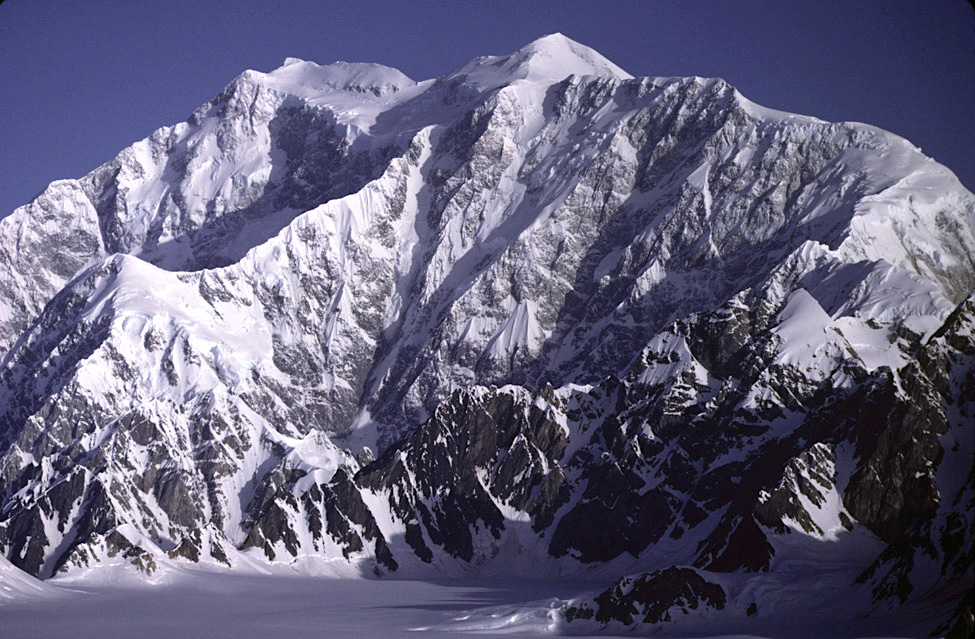
2. Mount Logan in Yukon is the highest summit of Canada.

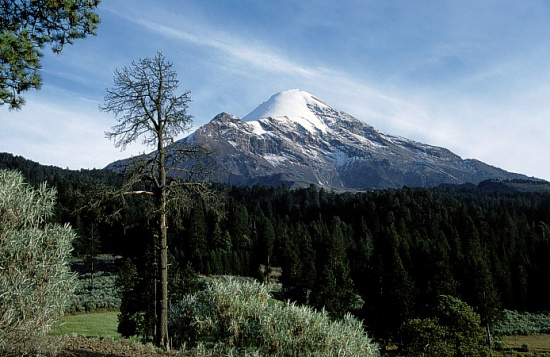
3. Pico de Orizaba is the highest summit of México.

4. Mount Saint Elias is the second highest summit of both Canada and the United States.

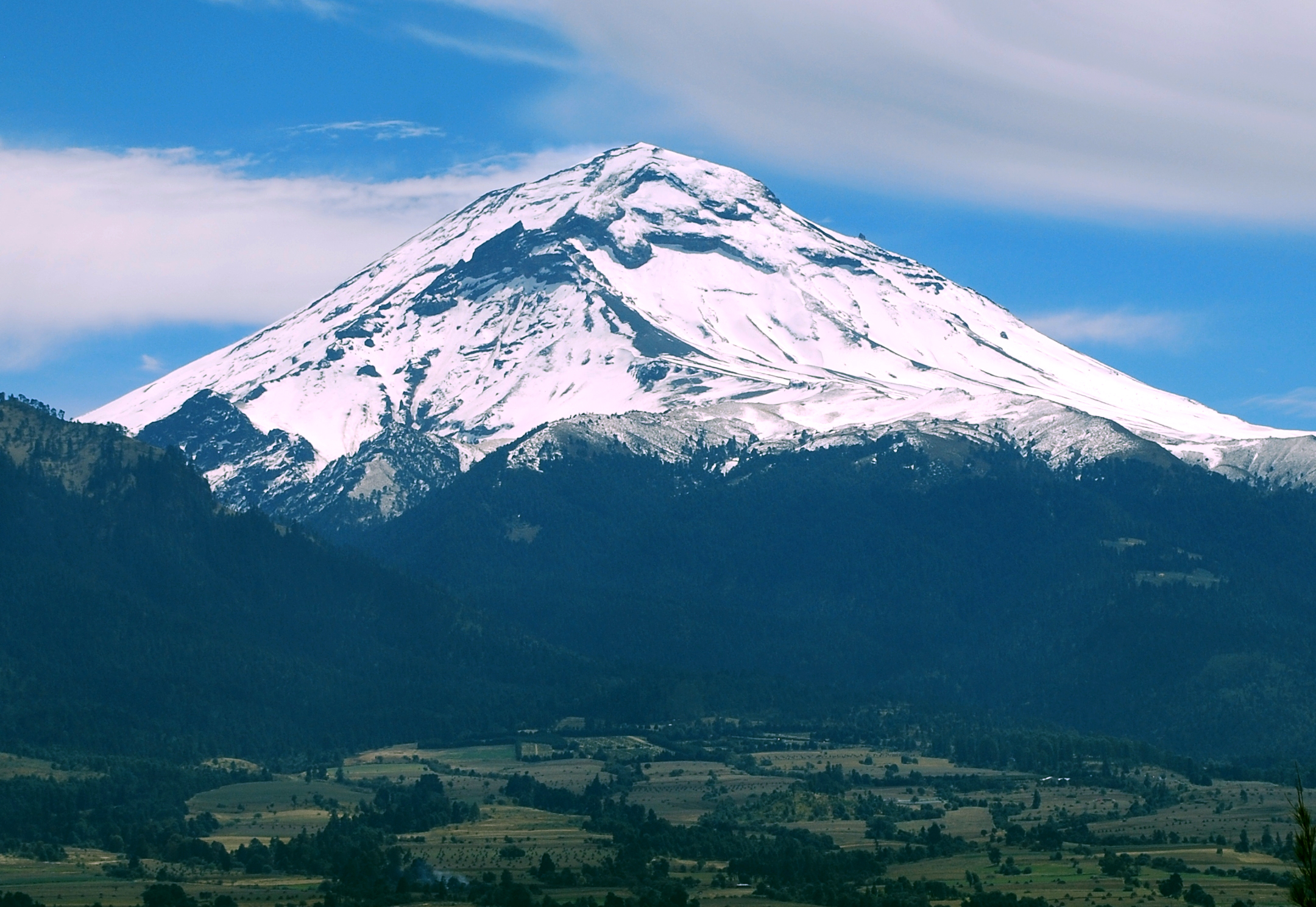
5. Volcán Popocatépetl is the second highest summit of México.

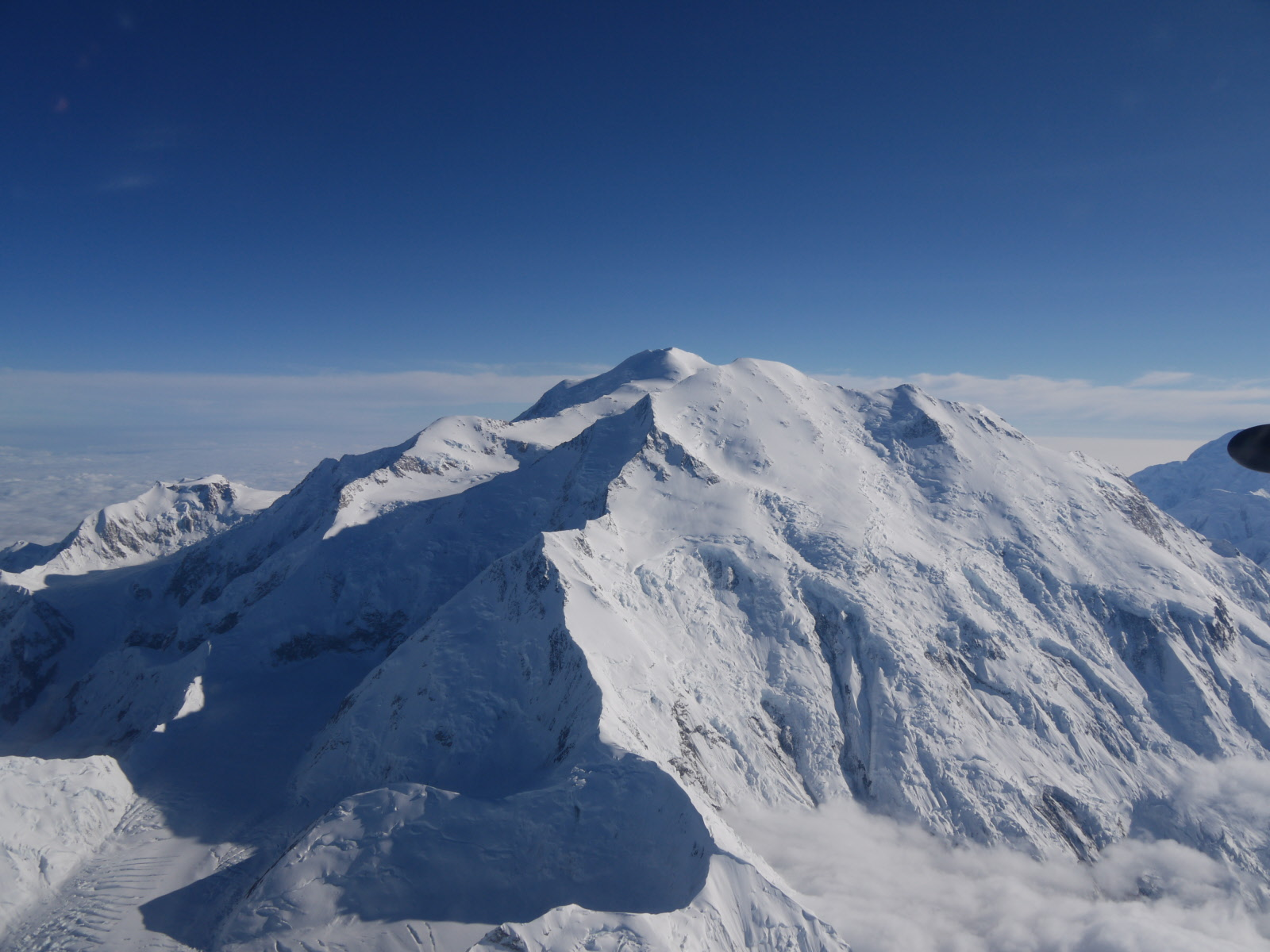
6. Mount Foraker is the second highest major summit of the Alaska Range.

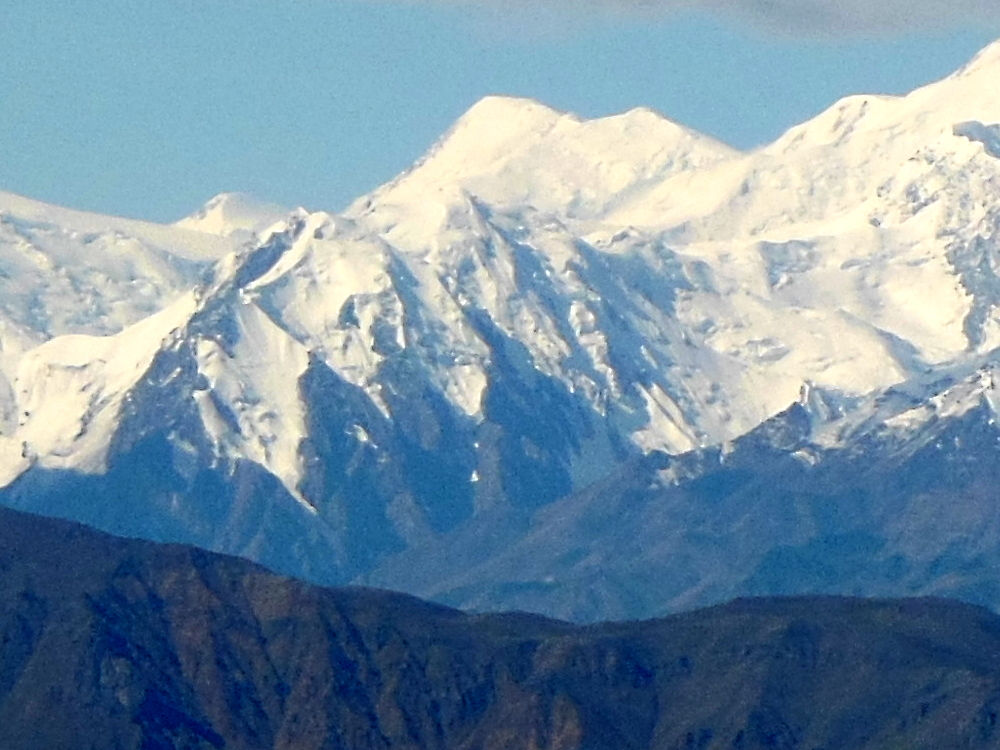
7. Mount Lucania in Yukon is the highest summit of the northern Saint Elias Mountains.

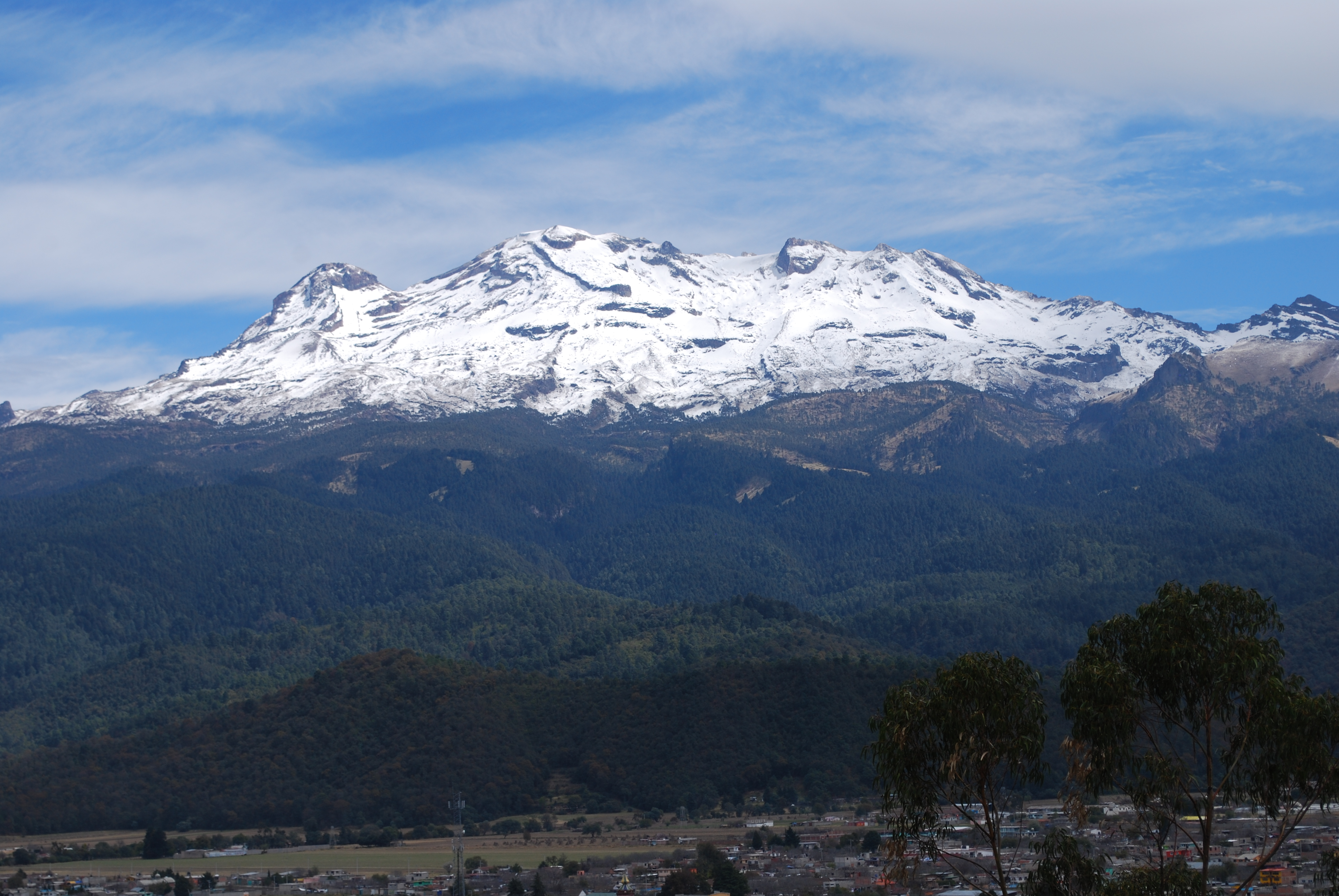
8. Volcán Iztaccíhuatl is the third highest summit of México.

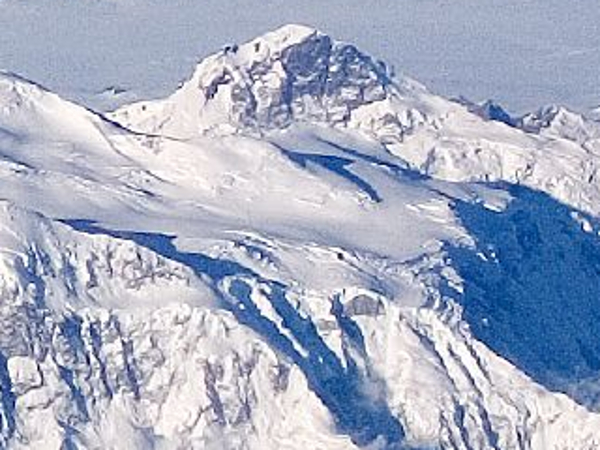
9. King Peak in Yukon is the fourth highest summit of Canada.

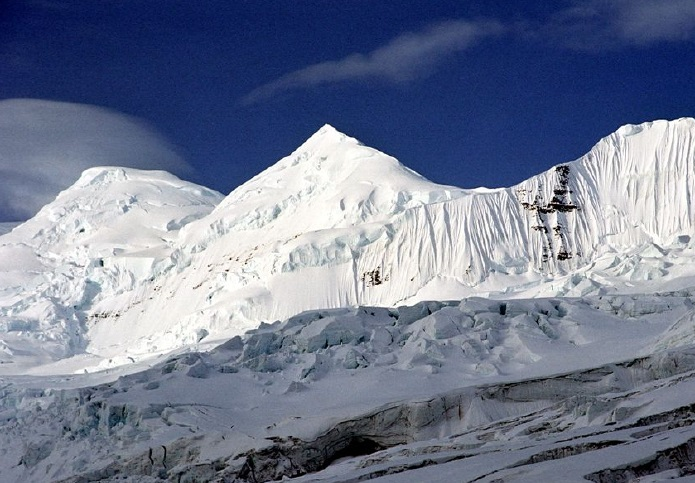
10. Mount Bona in Alaska is the highest volcano in the United States.

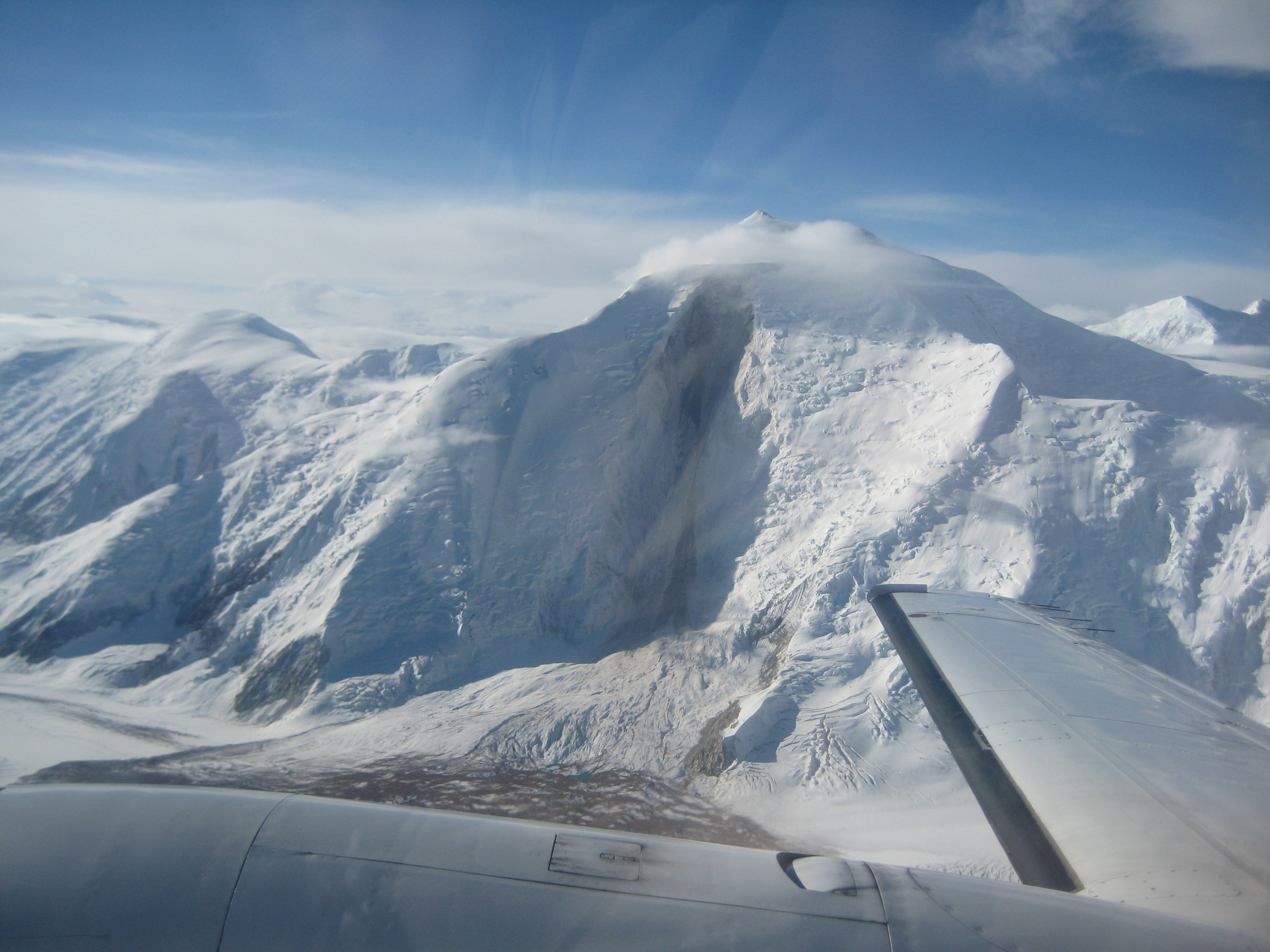
11. Mount Steele in Yukon is the fifth highest summit of Canada.

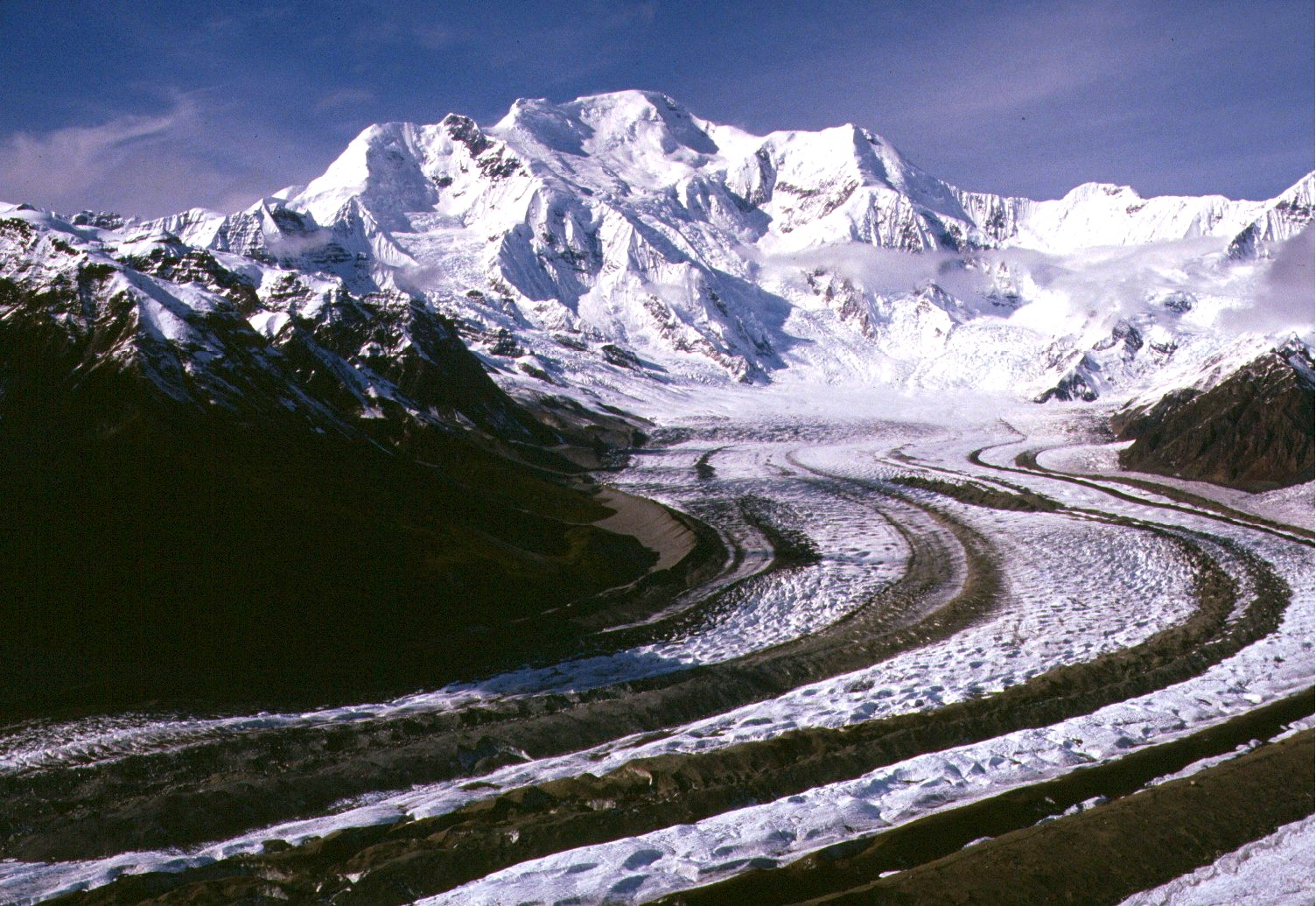
12. Mount Blackburn in Alaska is the highest summit of the Wrangell Mountains.

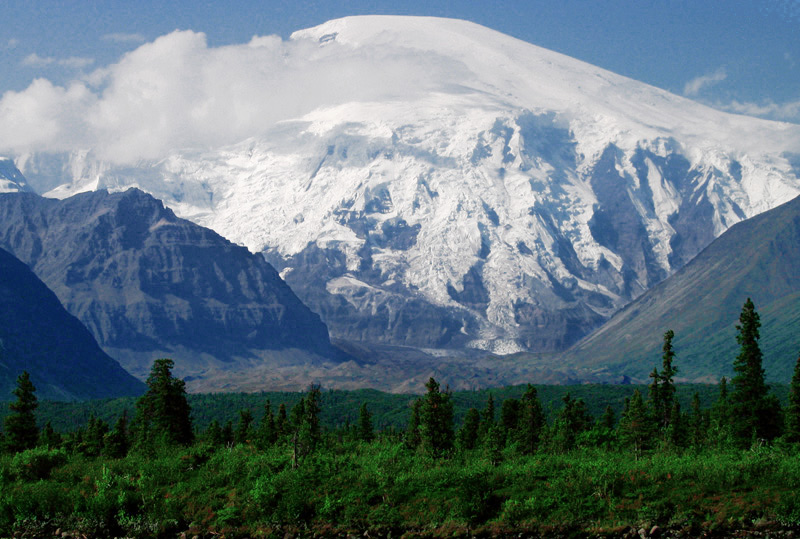
13. Mount Sanford in Alaska is the third highest volcano in the United States.

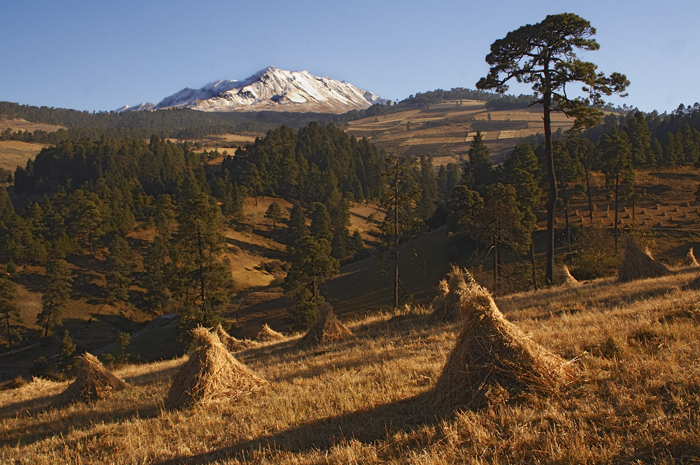
17. Nevado de Toluca is the fourth highest summit of México.

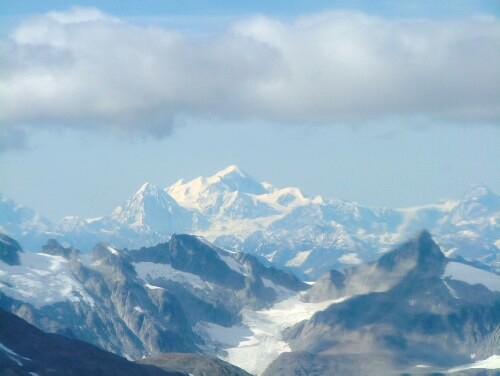
18. Mount Fairweather on the Alaska border is the highest summit of British Columbia.

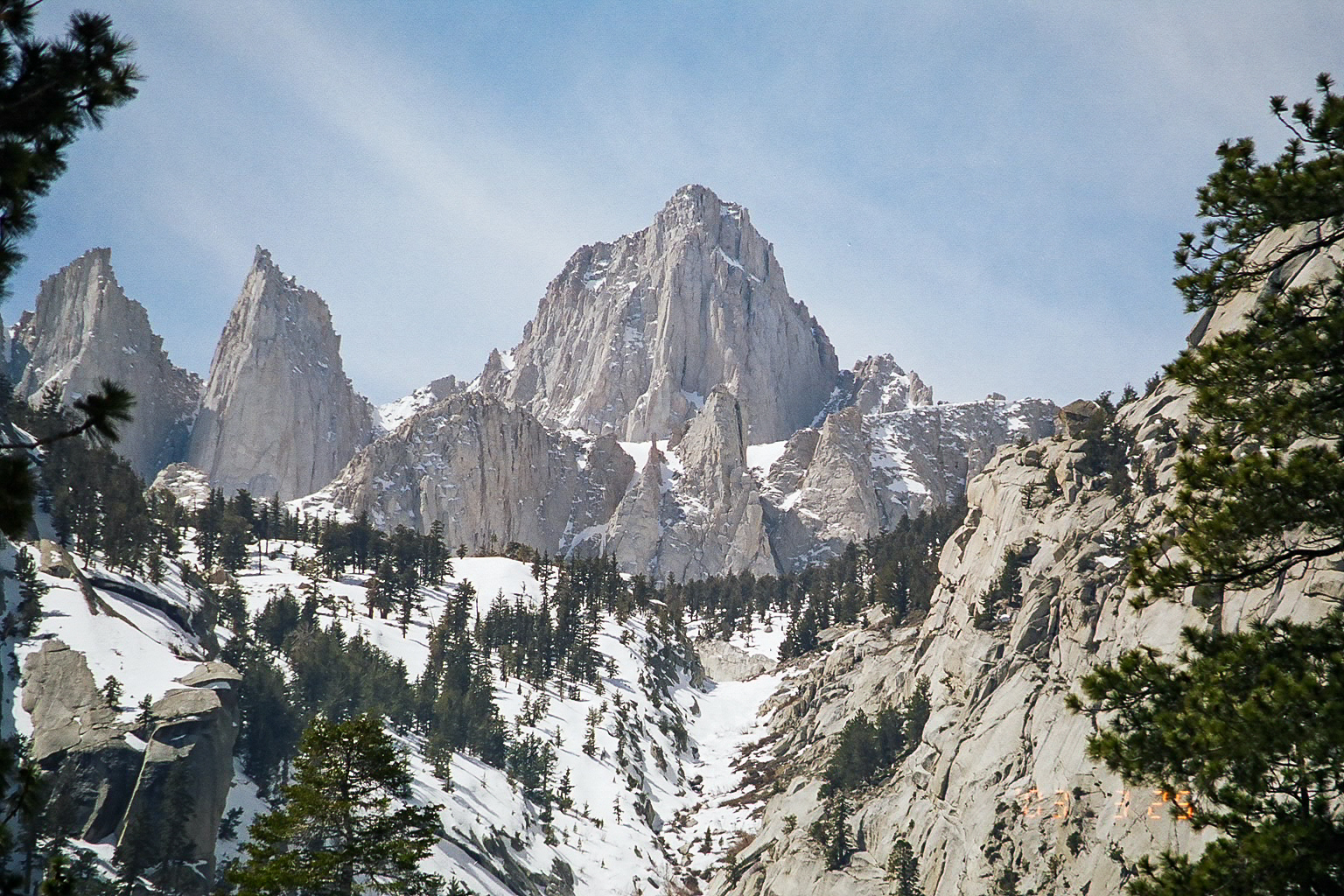
25. Mount Whitney highest summit of the Sierra Nevada and California.

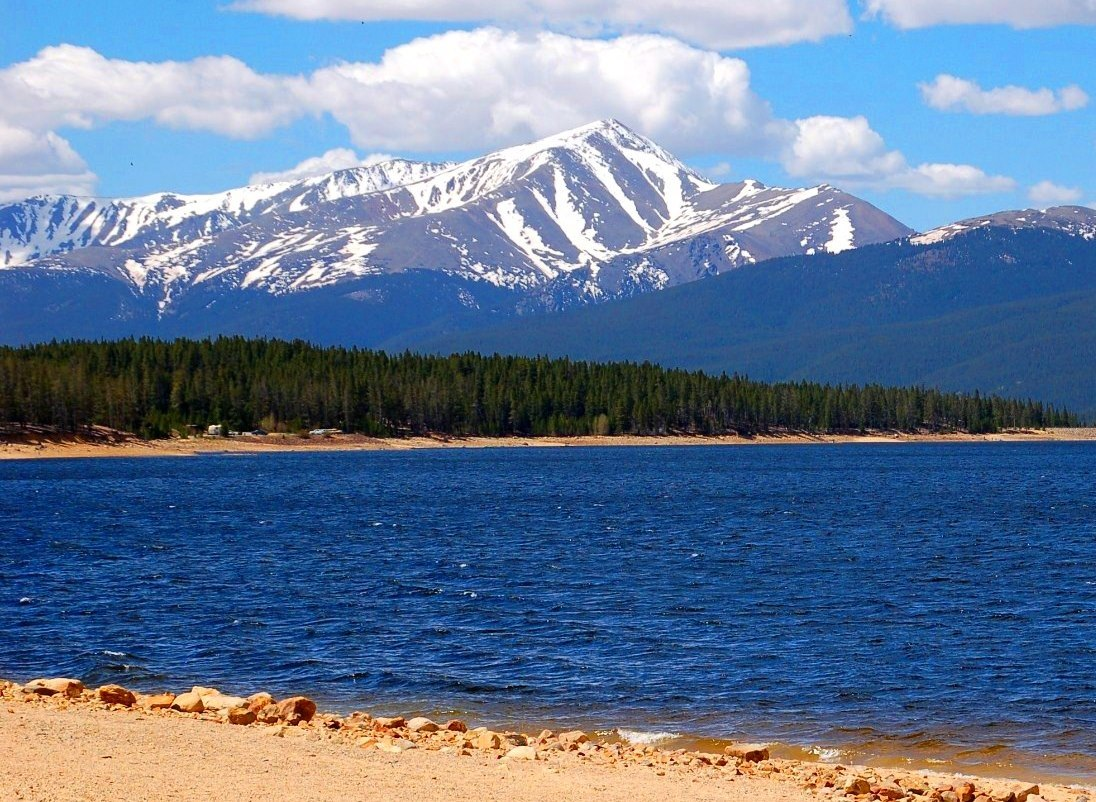
28. Mount Elbert is the highest summit of the Rocky Mountains and Colorado.

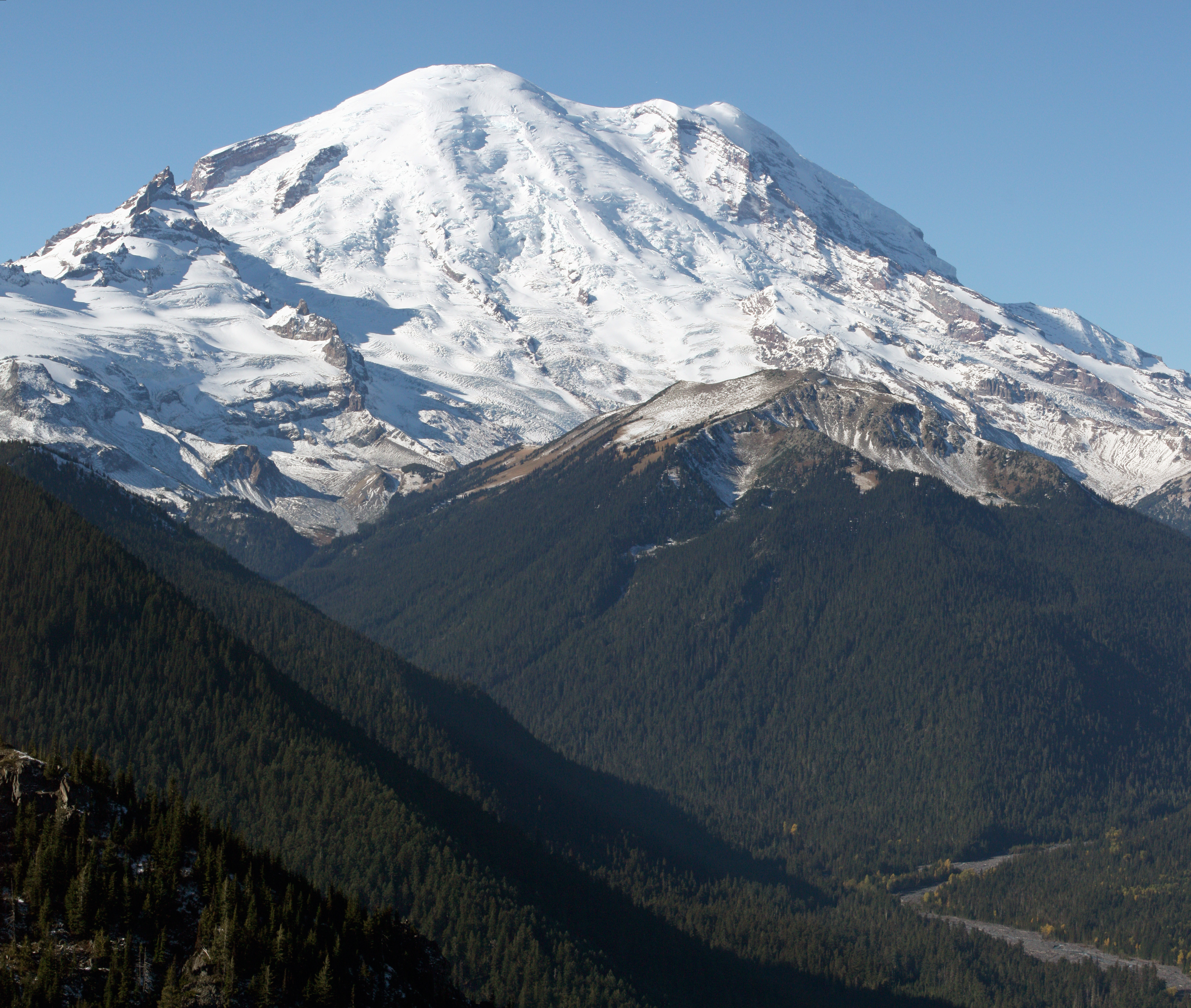
31. Mount Rainier is the highest summit of the Cascade Range and Washington.

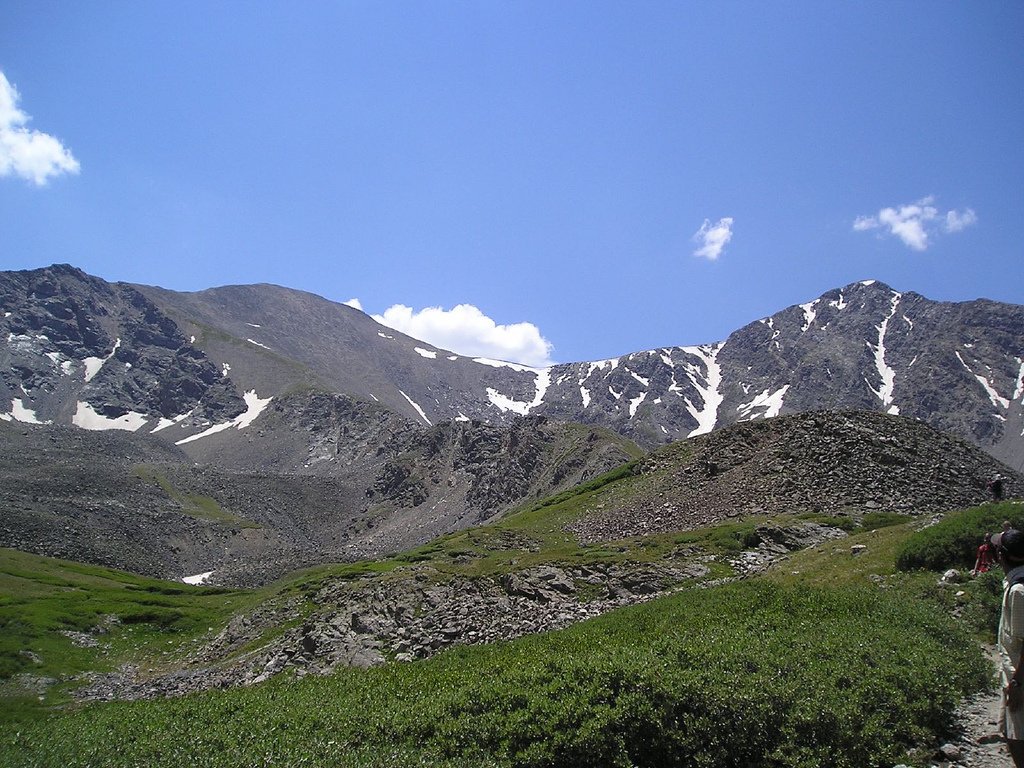
40. Grays Peak in Colorado is the highest point on the Continental Divide in North America.

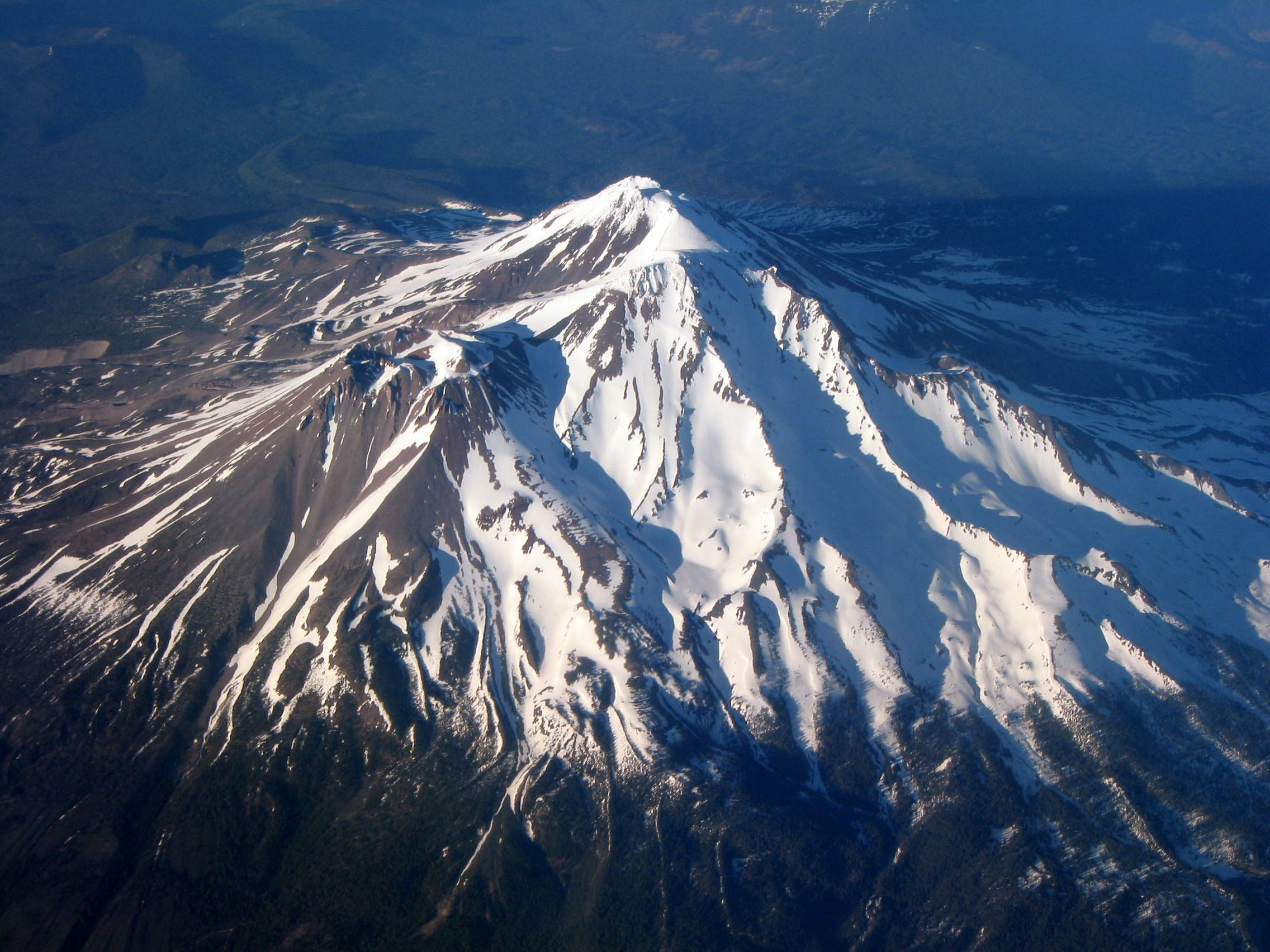
49. Mount Shasta in California is the highest summit of the southern Cascade Range.

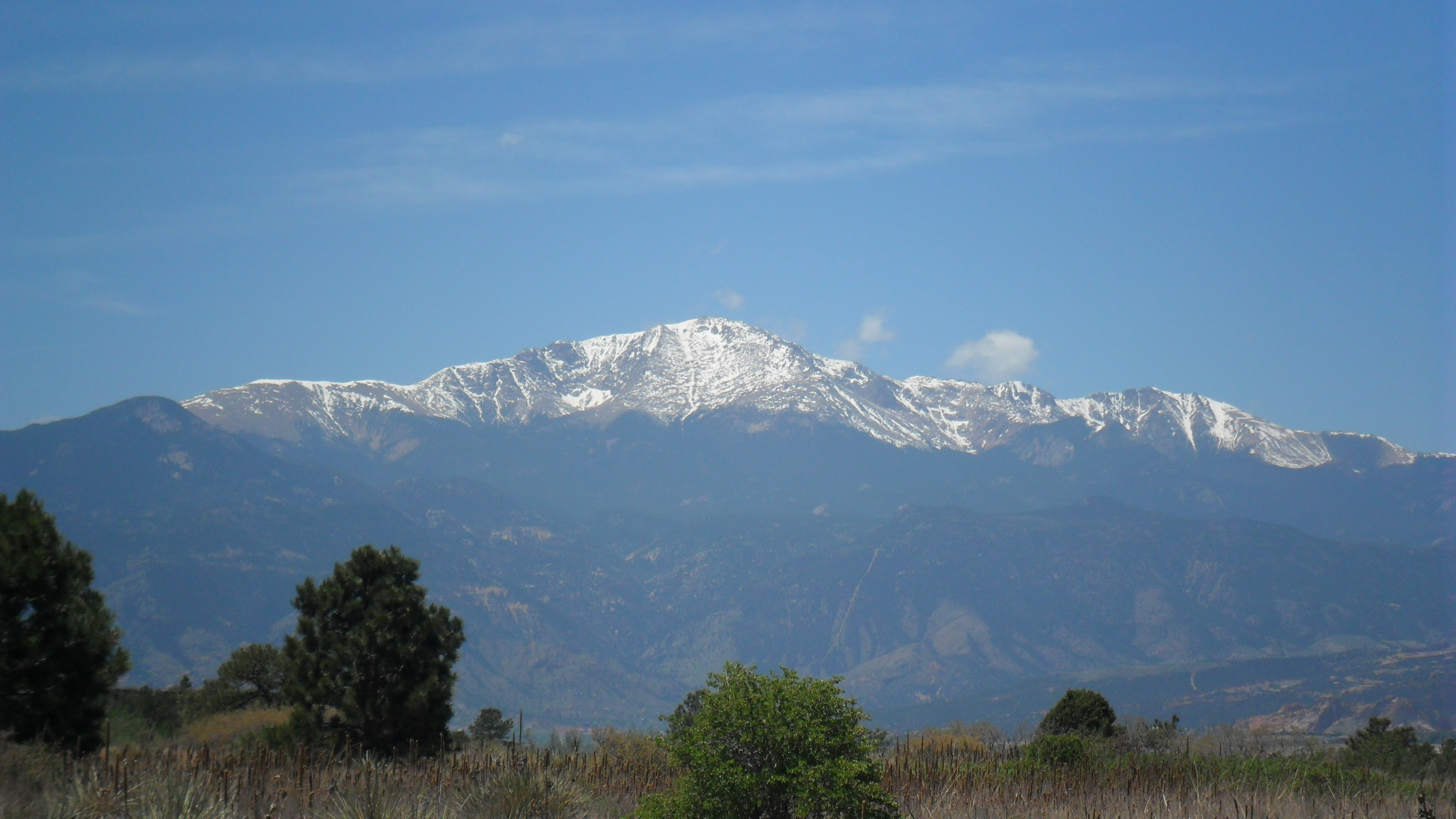
54. Pikes Peak in Colorado was the inspiration for America the Beautiful.

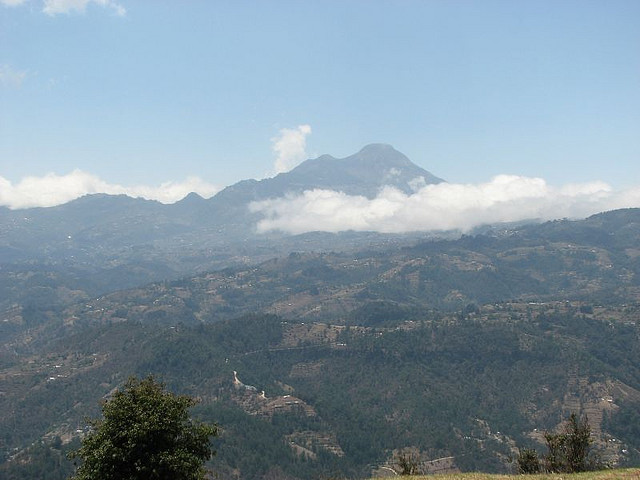
71. Volcán Tajumulco is the highest summit in Guatemala and all of Central America.

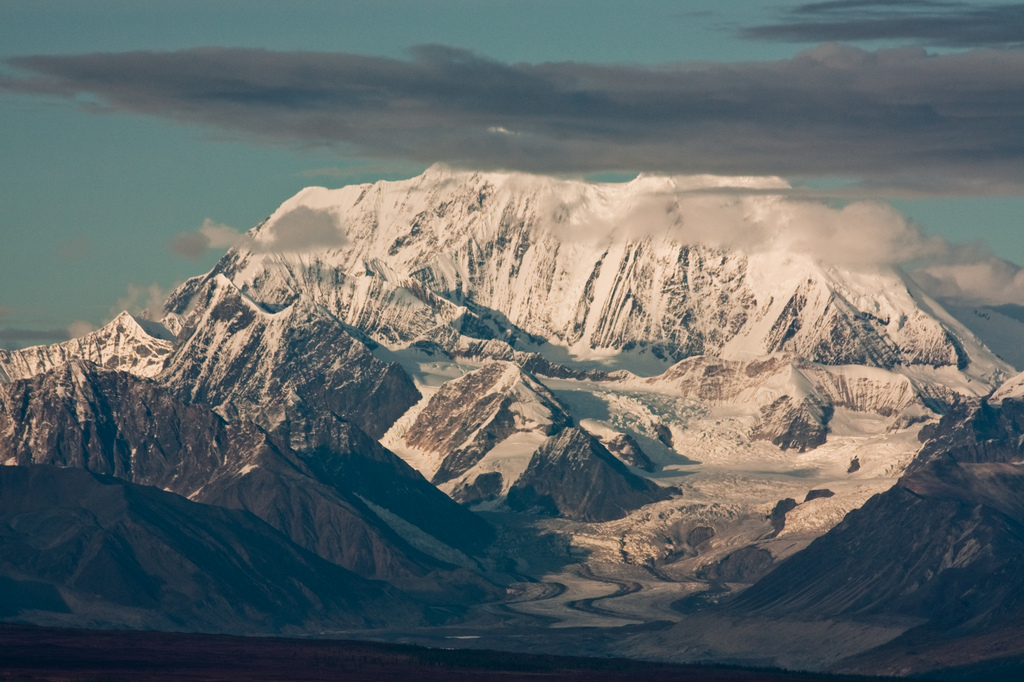
74. Mount Hayes is the highest summit of the eastern Alaska Range.

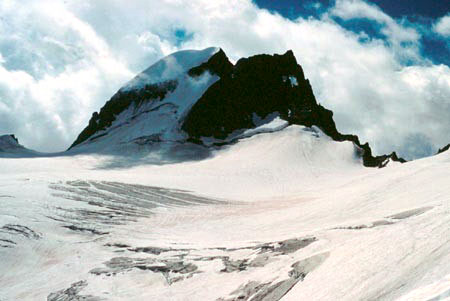
77. Gannett Peak is the highest summit of the Wind River Range and Wyoming.

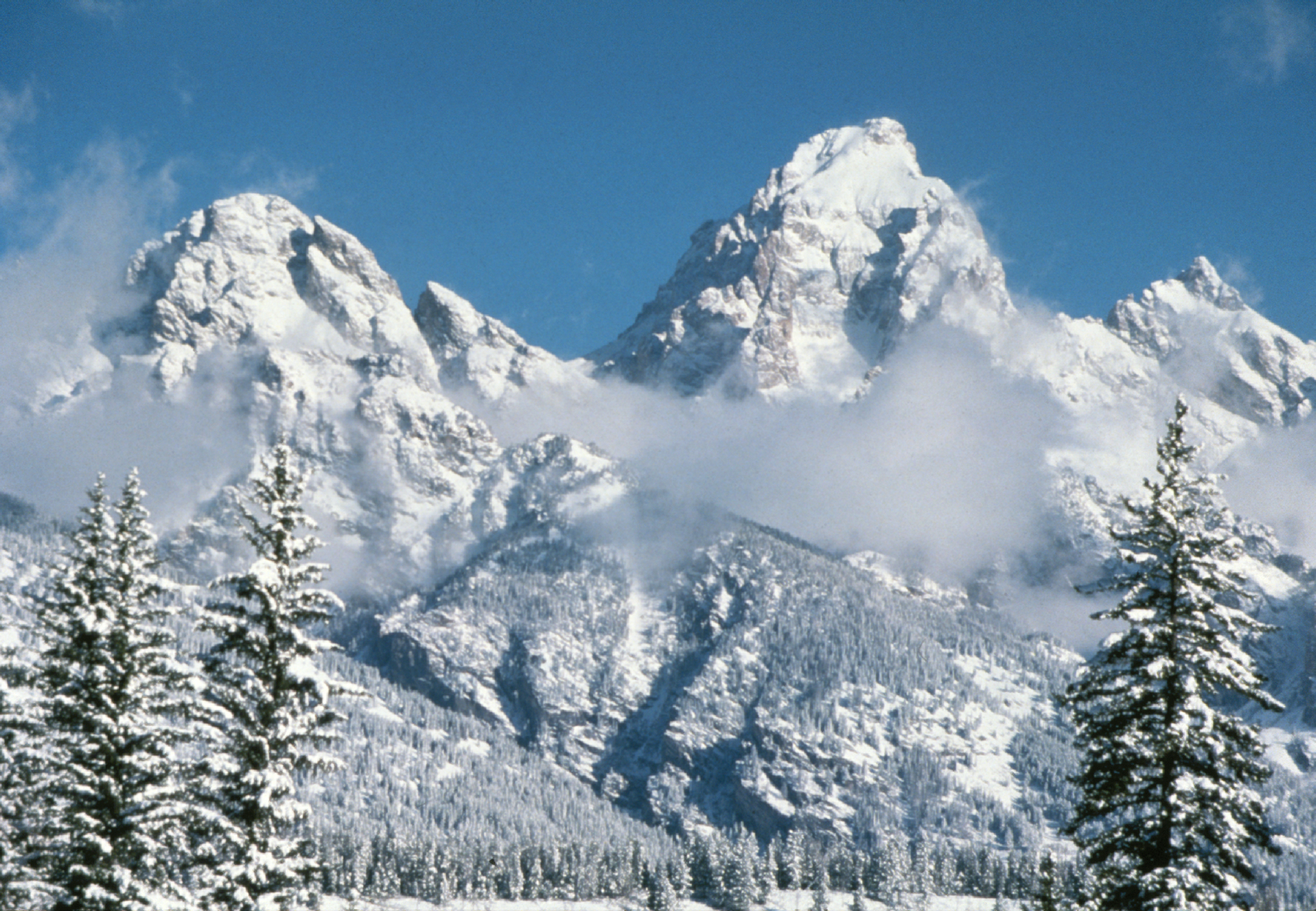
79. Grand Teton in Wyoming is the highest summit of the Teton Range.

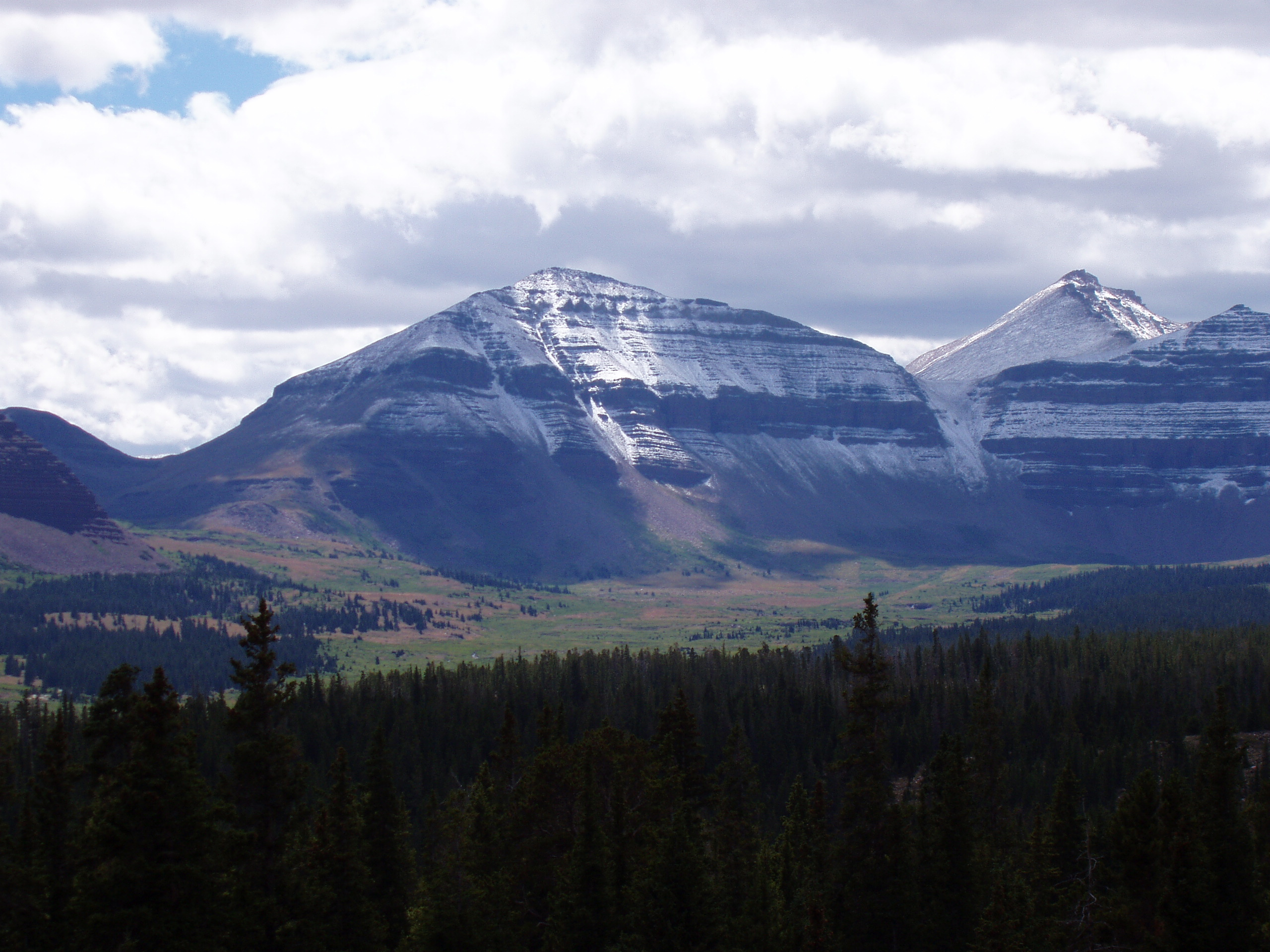
95. Kings Peak is the highest summit of the Uinta Range and Utah.

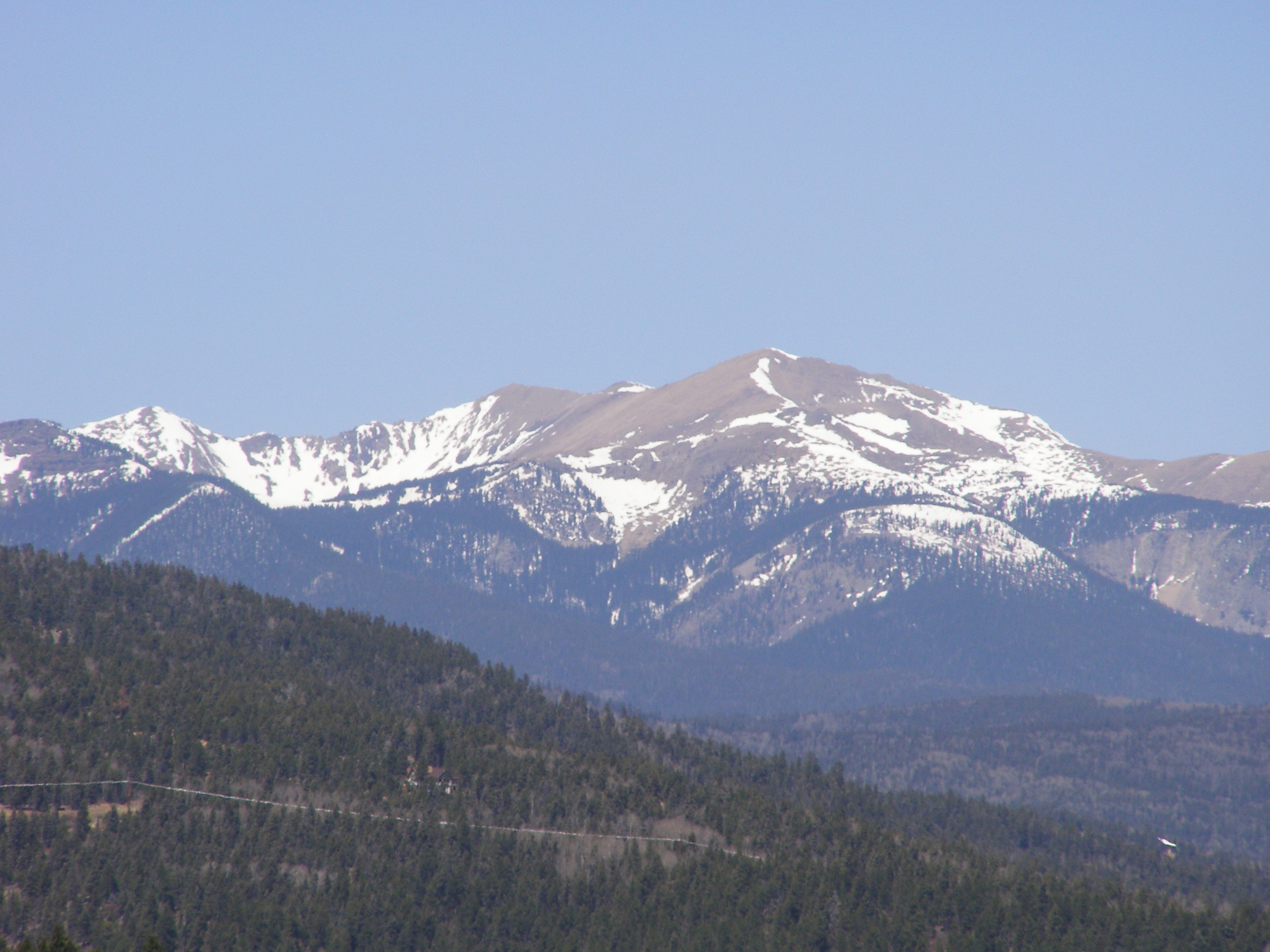
120. Wheeler Peak is the highest summit of New Mexico.

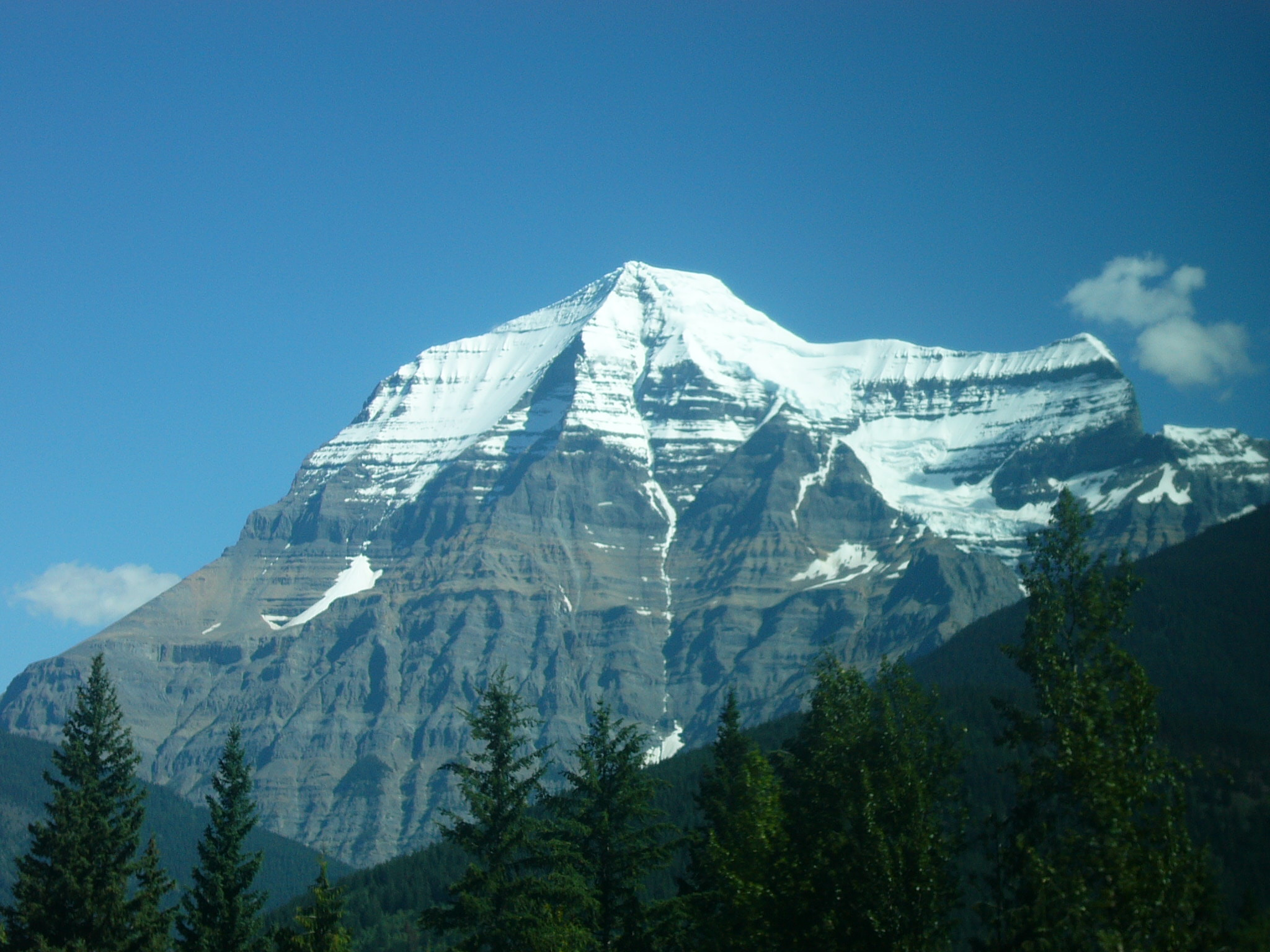
137. Mount Robson in British Columbia is the highest summit of the Canadian Rockies.

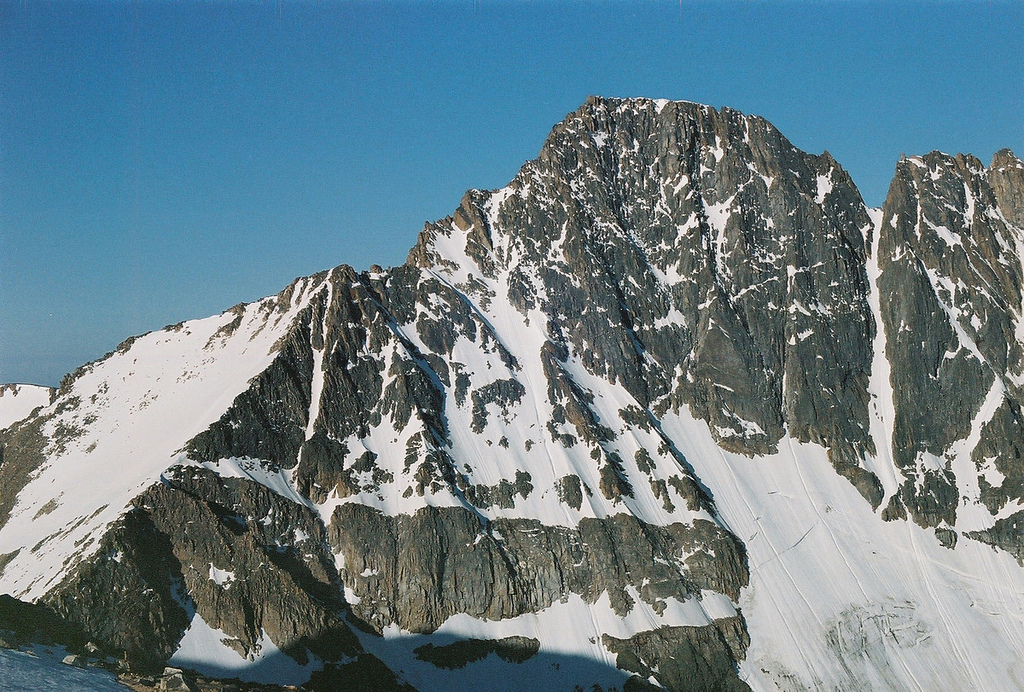
145. Granite Peak is the highest summit of the Beartooth Range and Montana.

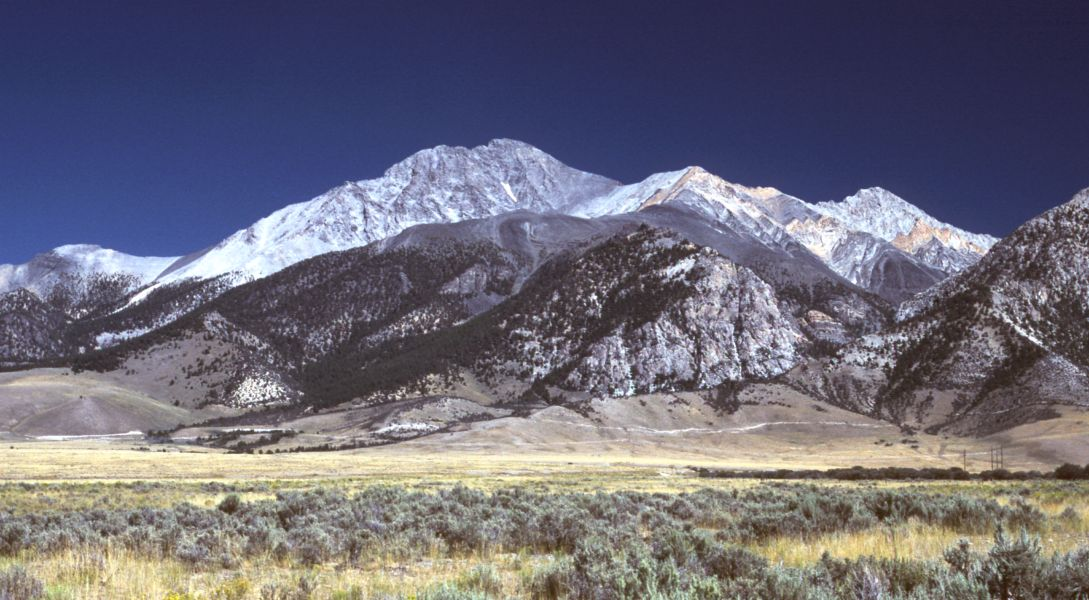
153. Borah Peak is the highest summit of the Lost River Range and Idaho.

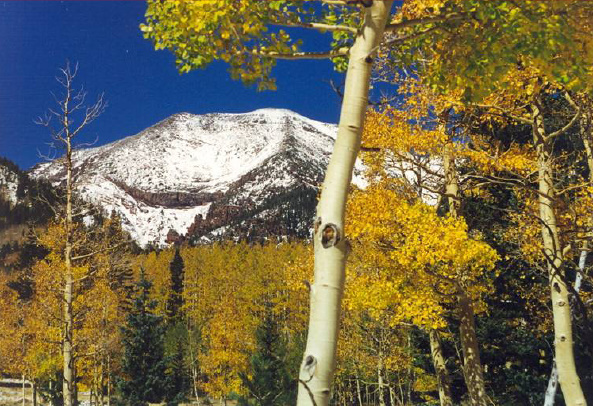
157. Humphreys Peak is the highest summit of the San Francisco Peaks and Arizona.

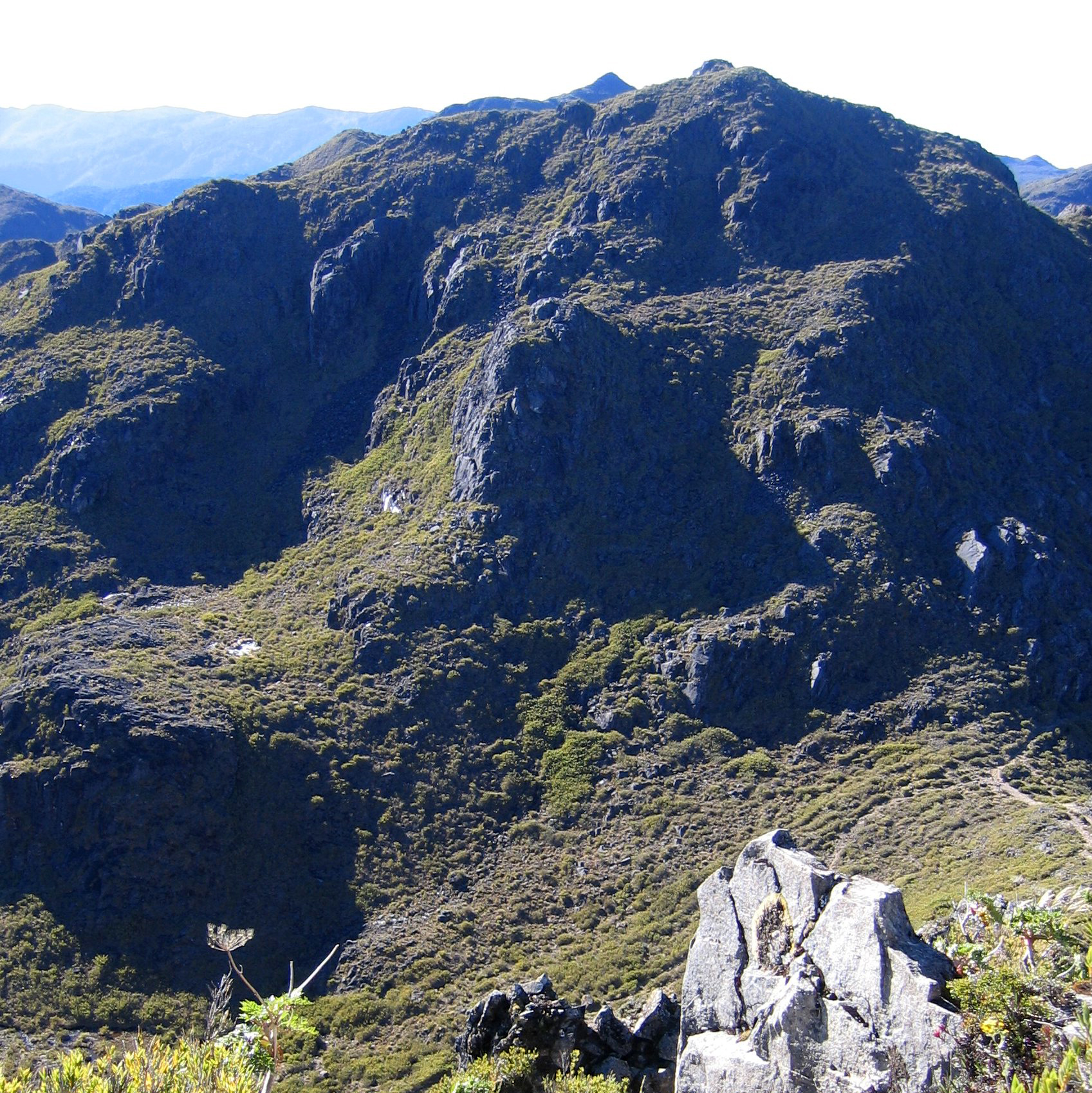
173. Chirripó Grande is the highest summit of Costa Rica.

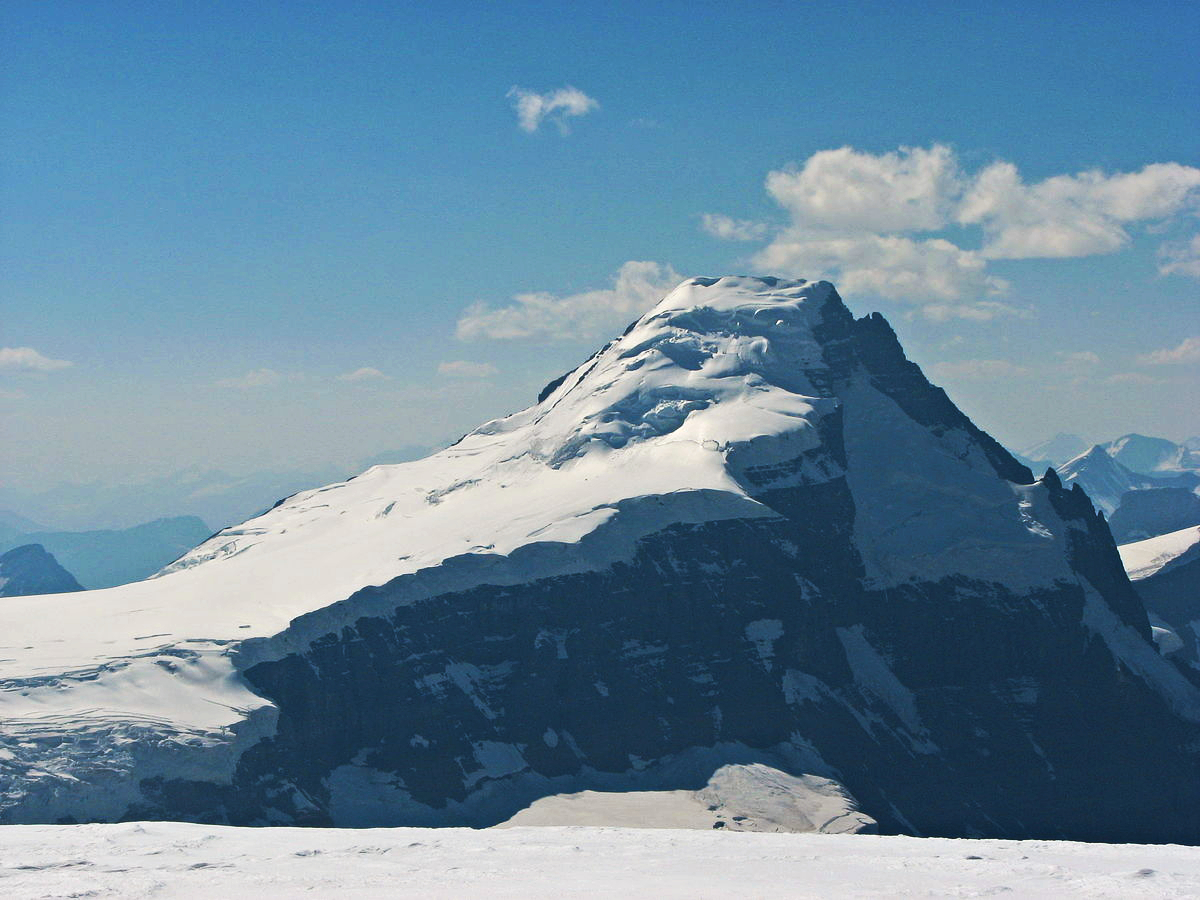
200. Mount Columbia on the British Columbia border is the highest summit of Alberta.

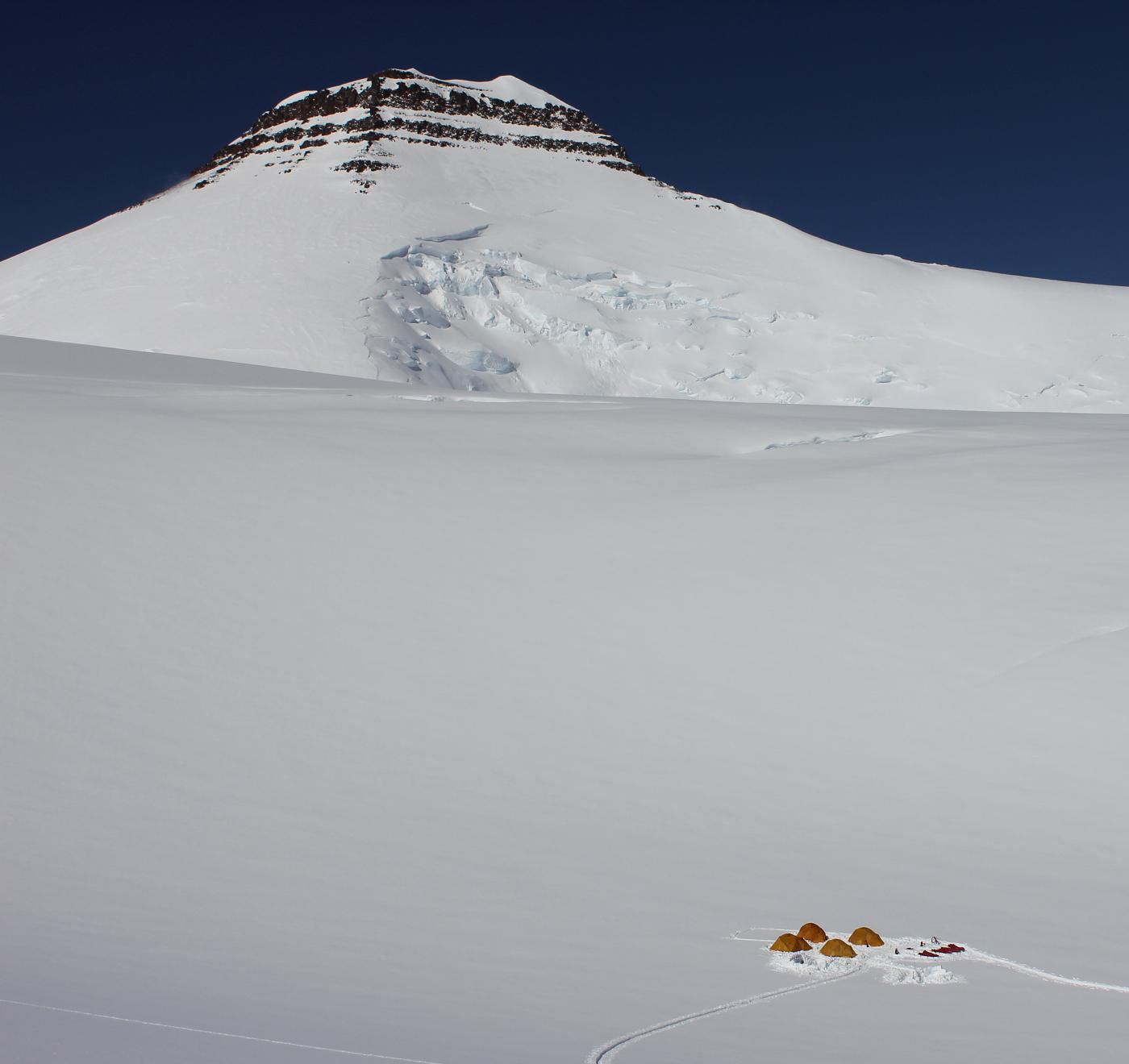
220. Gunnbjørn Fjeld is the highest summit of Greenland and all of the Arctic.

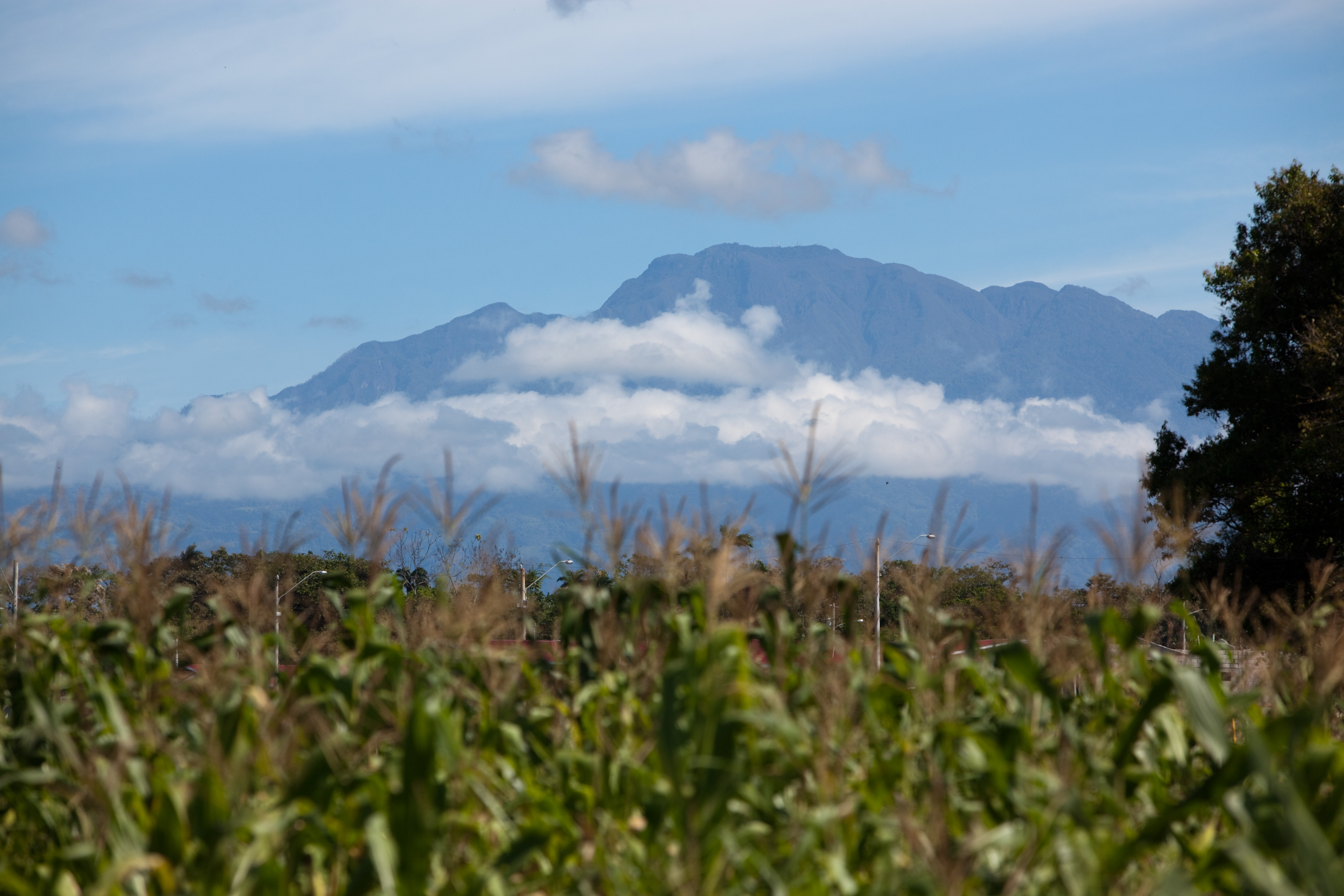
289. Volcán Barú is the highest summit of Panama.

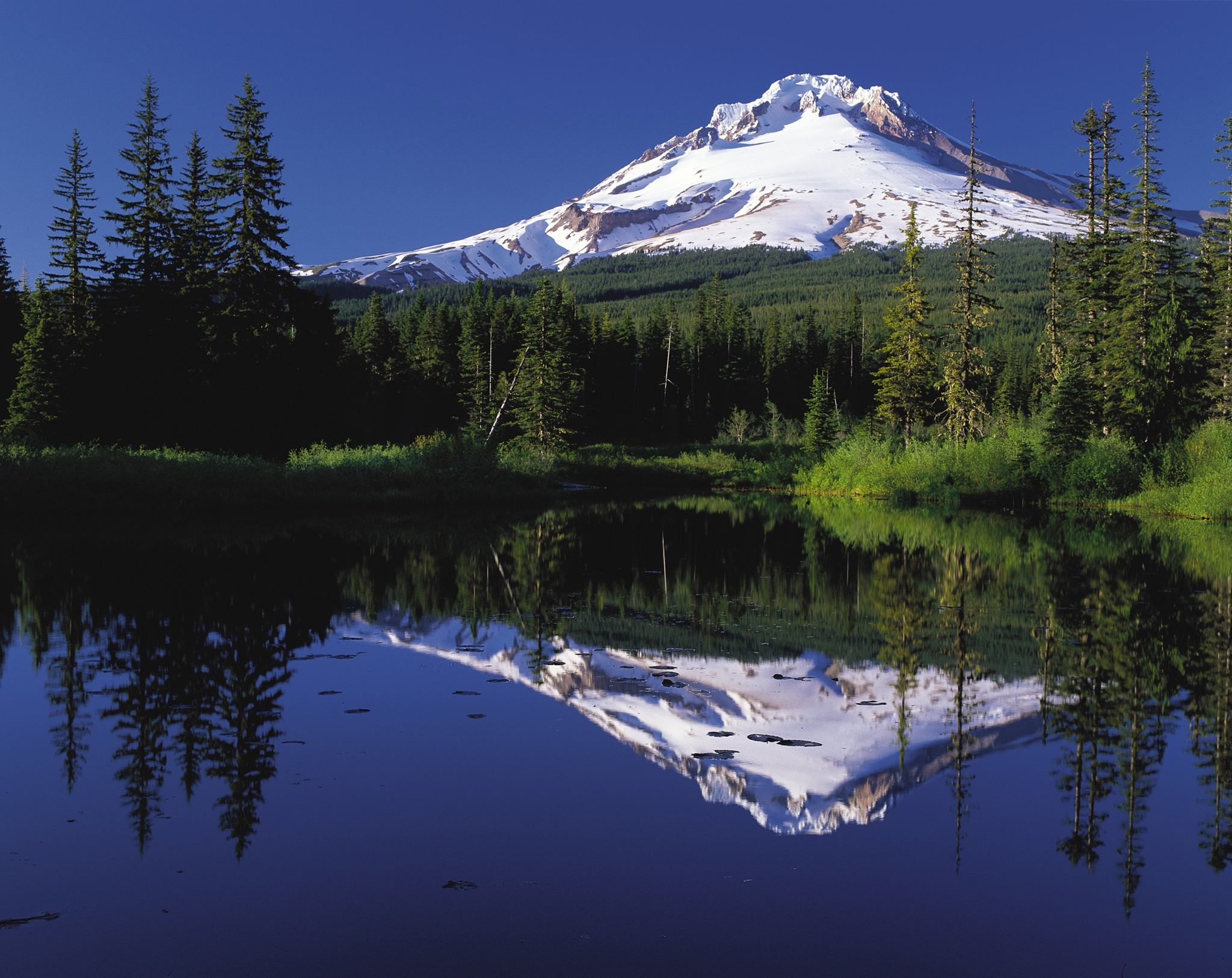
304. Mount Hood is the highest summit of Oregon.

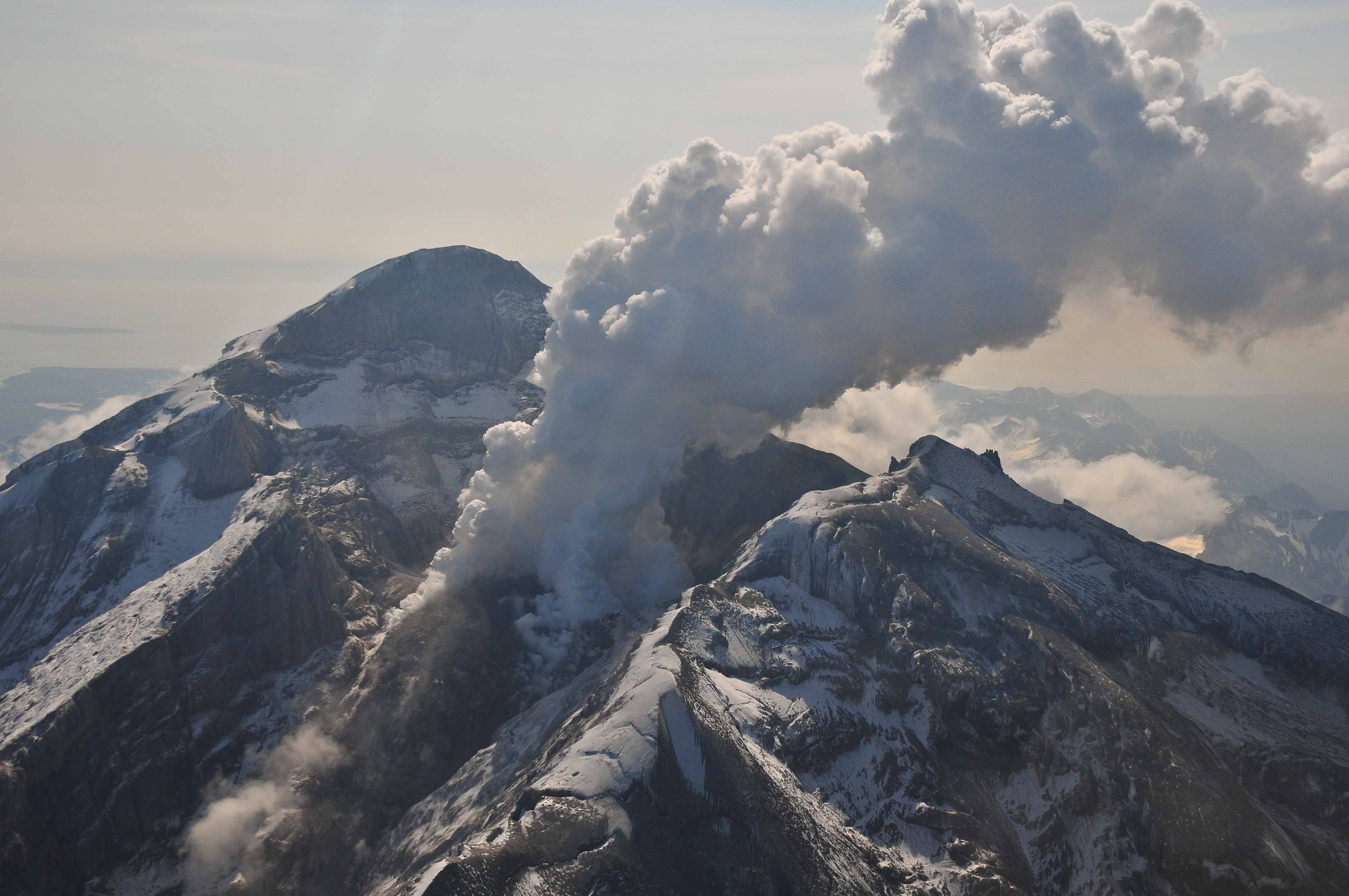
379. Redoubt Volcano is the highest summit of the Aleutian Range.

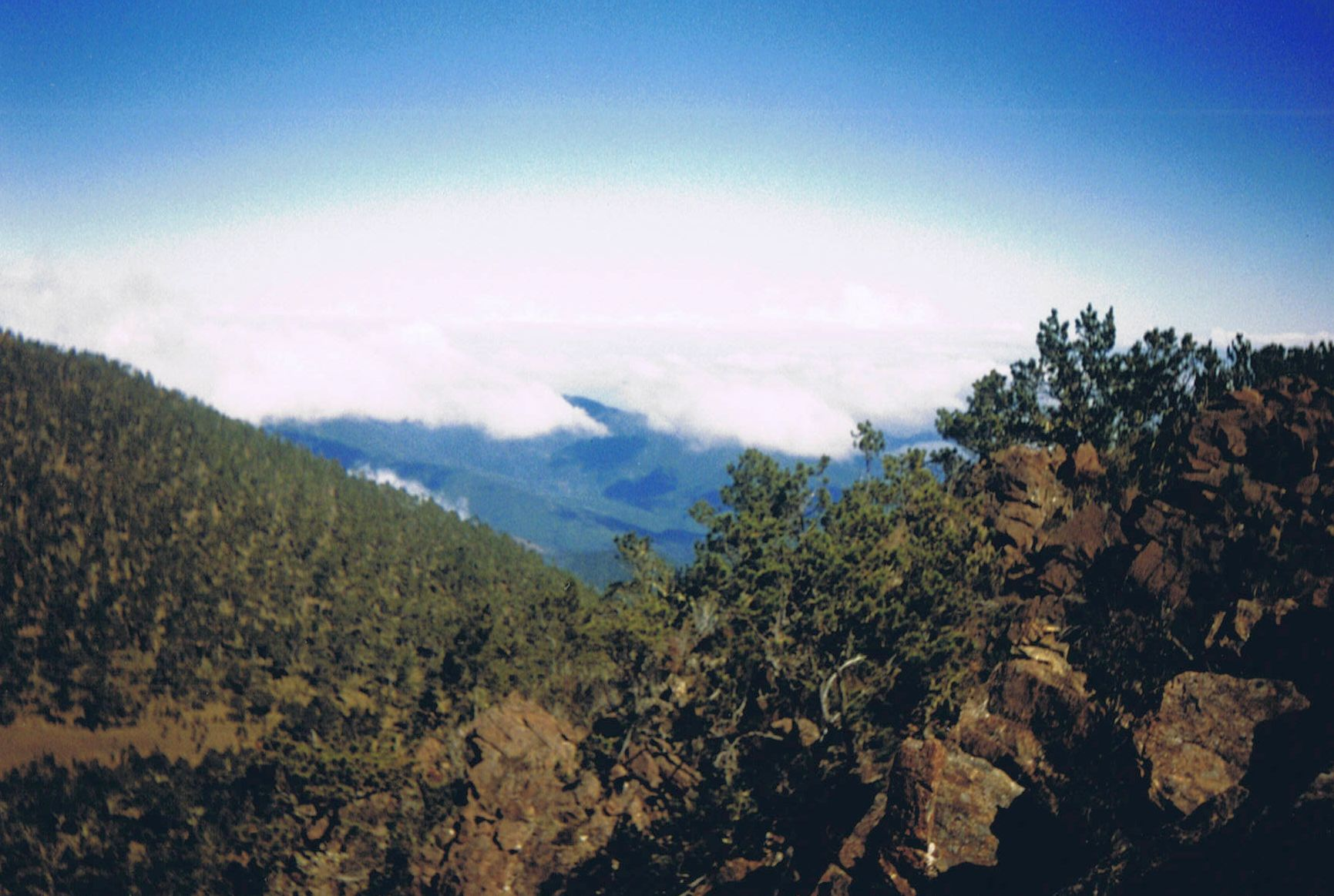
381. Pico Duarte in the Dominican Republic on Hispaniola is the highest summit in the Caribbean.

== See also ==
- North America
  - Geography of North America
  - Geology of North America
  - Lists of mountain peaks of North America
    - List of mountain peaks of North America
      - List of the highest major summits of North America
        - List of the highest islands of North America
      - List of the most prominent summits of North America
        - List of the ultra-prominent summits of North America
      - List of the most isolated major summits of North America
        - List of the major 100-kilometer summits of North America
      - List of extreme summits of North America
      - List of mountain peaks of Greenland
      - List of mountain peaks of Canada
      - List of mountain peaks of the Rocky Mountains
      - List of mountain peaks of the United States
      - List of mountain peaks of México
      - List of mountain peaks of Central America
      - List of mountain peaks of the Caribbean
    - Category:Mountains of North America
      - commons:Category:Mountains of North America
- Physical geography
  - Topography
    - Topographic elevation
    - Topographic prominence
    - Topographic isolation
