= List of mountain peaks of California =

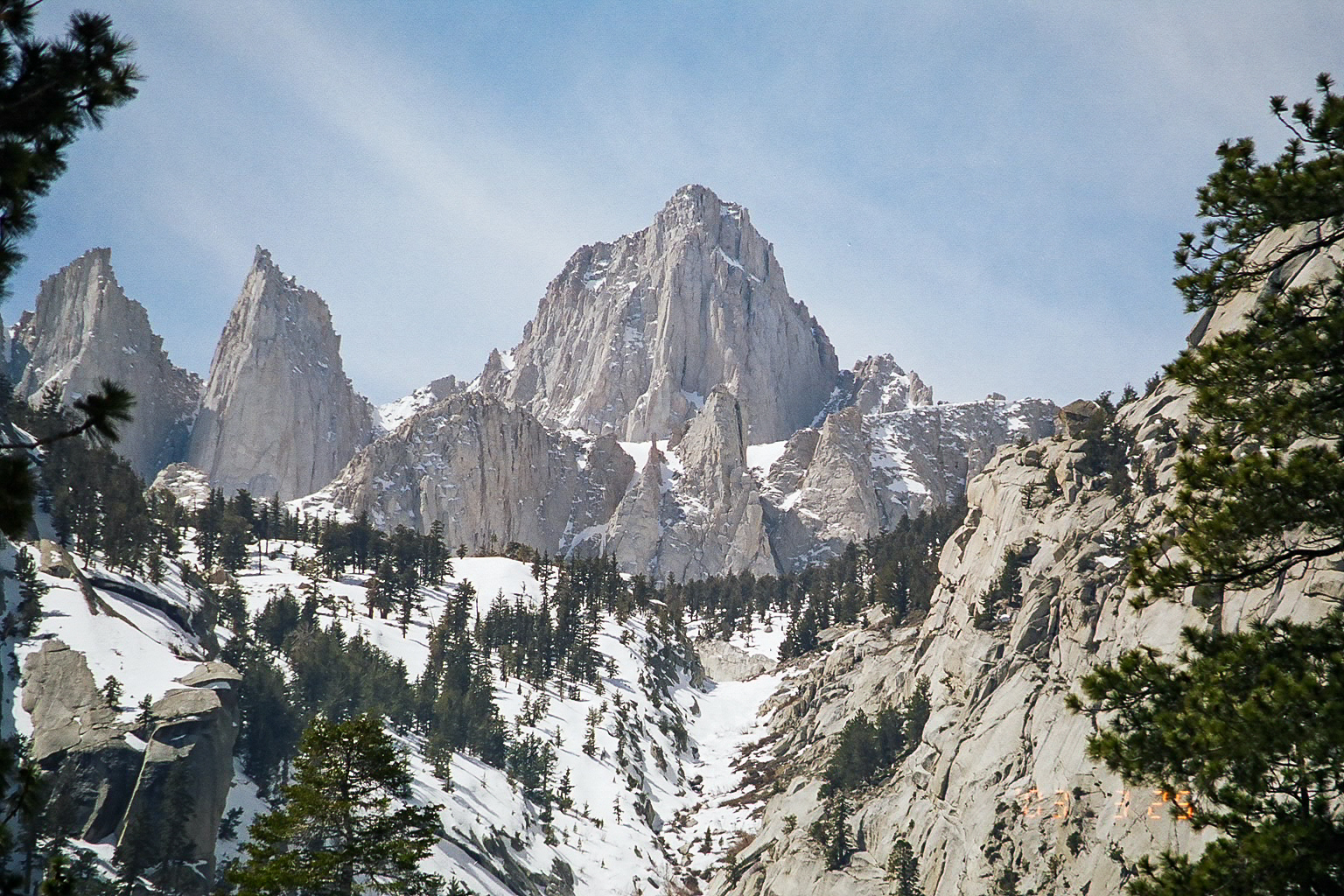
Mount Whitney is the highest mountain peak in the Sierra Nevada, the State of California, and the contiguous United States.

This article comprises three sortable tables of major mountain peaks (Note: This article defines a significant summit as a summit with at least 100 meters (328.1 feet) of topographic prominence, and a major summit as a summit with at least 500 meters (1640 feet) of topographic prominence. All summits in this article have at least 500 meters of topographic prominence. An ultra-prominent summit is a summit with at least 1500 meters (4921 feet) of topographic prominence.) of the U.S. State of California.

The summit of a mountain or hill may be measured in three principal ways:

1. The topographic elevation of a summit measures the height of the summit above a geodetic sea level. (Note: All elevations in this article include an elevation adjustment from the National Geodetic Vertical Datum of 1929 (NGVD 29) to the North American Vertical Datum of 1988 (NAVD 88). For further information, please see this United States National Geodetic Survey note.) (Note: If the elevation or prominence of a summit is calculated as a range of values, the arithmetic mean is shown.) The first table below ranks the 50 highest major summits of California by elevation.
2. The topographic prominence of a summit is a measure of how high the summit rises above its surroundings. (Note: The topographic prominence of a summit is the topographic elevation difference between the summit and its highest or key col to a higher summit. The summit may be near its key col or quite far away. The key col for Denali in Alaska is the Isthmus of Rivas in Nicaragua, 7642 kilometers (4749 miles) away.) The second table below ranks the 50 most prominent summits of California.
3. The topographic isolation (or radius of dominance) of a summit measures how far the summit lies from its nearest point of equal elevation. (Note: The topographic isolation of a summit is the great-circle distance to its nearest point of equal elevation.) The third table below ranks the 50 most isolated major summits of California.

== Highest major summits ==
Of the highest major summits of California, 16 peaks exceed 4000 meters (13,123 feet) and 46 peaks exceed 3000 meters (9843 feet) elevation.

The 50 highest summits of California with at least 500 meters of topographic prominence
Rank	Mountain peak	Mountain range	Elevation	Prominence	Isolation	Location
1	Mount Whitney (Note: The summit of Mount Whitney is the highest point of the Sierra Nevada, the State of California, and the contiguous United States.) (Note: Mount Whitney is the southernmost and easternmost summit of its elevation in United States.)	Sierra Nevada	14,505 ft 4421 m	10,080 ft 3072 m	1,646 mi 2,649 km	36.5786°N 118.2920°W
2	Mount Williamson (Note: The elevation of Mount Williamson includes an adjustment of +1.807 m (5.93 ft) from NGVD 29 to NAVD 88.)	Sierra Nevada	14,379 ft 4383 m	1,676 ft 511 m	5.41 mi 8.7 km	36.6559°N 118.3111°W
3	White Mountain Peak (Note: The summit of White Mountain Peak is the highest point of the White Mountains.)	White Mountains	14,252 ft 4344 m	7,196 ft 2193 m	67.4 mi 108.6 km	37.6341°N 118.2557°W
4	North Palisade (Note: The summit of North Palisade is the highest point of the Palisades.) (Note: The elevation of North Palisade includes an adjustment of +1.867 m (6.13 ft) from NGVD 29 to NAVD 88.)	Sierra Nevada	14,248 ft 4343 m	2,894 ft 882 m	32.2 mi 51.8 km	37.0943°N 118.5145°W
5	Mount Shasta (Note: The summit of Mount Shasta is the highest point of the southern Cascade Range.)	Cascade Range	14,179 ft 4321.8 m	9,772 ft 2979 m	335 mi 539 km	41.4092°N 122.1949°W
6	Mount Humphreys (Note: The elevation of Mount Humphreys includes an adjustment of +1.842 m (6.04 ft) from NGVD 29 to NAVD 88.)	Sierra Nevada	13,992 ft 4265 m	2,563 ft 781 m	14.71 mi 23.7 km	37.2705°N 118.6730°W
7	Mount Keith (Note: The elevation of Mount Keith includes an adjustment of +1.795 m (5.89 ft) from NGVD 29 to NAVD 88.)	Sierra Nevada	13,982 ft 4262 m	1,936 ft 590 m	3.09 mi 4.97 km	36.7001°N 118.3436°W
8	Mount Darwin (Note: The elevation of Mount Darwin includes an adjustment of +1.886 m (6.19 ft) from NGVD 29 to NAVD 88.)	Sierra Nevada	13,837 ft 4218 m	1,891 ft 576 m	7.13 mi 11.48 km	37.1669°N 118.6721°W
9	Mount Kaweah (Note: The summit of Mount Kaweah is the highest point of the Great Western Divide.) (Note: Mount Kaweah is the southernmost summit of its elevation in United States.) (Note: The elevation of Mount Kaweah includes an adjustment of +1.652 m (5.42 ft) from NGVD 29 to NAVD 88.)	Sierra Nevada	13,807 ft 4209 m	2,027 ft 618 m	10.73 mi 17.27 km	36.5261°N 118.4785°W
10	Mount Morgan	Sierra Nevada	13,758 ft 4193.4 m	2,648 ft 807 m	9.86 mi 15.87 km	37.4053°N 118.7329°W
11	Mount Gabb (Note: The elevation of Mount Gabb includes an adjustment of +1.958 m (6.42 ft) from NGVD 29 to NAVD 88.)	Sierra Nevada	13,747 ft 4190 m	2,601 ft 793 m	4.28 mi 6.89 km	37.3769°N 118.8025°W
12	Mount Tom (Note: The elevation of Mount Tom includes an adjustment of +1.379 m (4.52 ft) from NGVD 29 to NAVD 88.)	Sierra Nevada	13,657 ft 4163 m	1,992 ft 607 m	4.77 mi 7.67 km	37.3385°N 118.6570°W
13	Mount Dubois (Note: The elevation of Mount Dubois includes an adjustment of +1.879 m (6.16 ft) from NGVD 29 to NAVD 88.)	White Mountains	13,565 ft 4135 m	2,339 ft 713 m	9.63 mi 15.5 km	37.7834°N 118.3432°W
14	Mount Pinchot (Note: The elevation of Mount Pinchot includes an adjustment of +1.81 m (5.94 ft) from NGVD 29 to NAVD 88.)	Sierra Nevada	13,500 ft 4115 m	2,110 ft 643 m	4.71 mi 7.58 km	36.9473°N 118.4054°W
15	Mount Ritter (Note: The summit of Mount Ritter is the highest point of the Ritter Range.) (Note: The elevation of Mount Ritter includes an adjustment of +1.786 m (5.86 ft) from NGVD 29 to NAVD 88.)	Sierra Nevada	13,149 ft 4008 m	3,990 ft 1216 m	22 mi 35.4 km	37.6891°N 119.1996°W
16	Red Slate Mountain (Note: The elevation of Red Slate Mountain includes an adjustment of +1.893 m (6.21 ft) from NGVD 29 to NAVD 88.)	Sierra Nevada	13,129 ft 4002 m	1,736 ft 529 m	8.31 mi 13.38 km	37.5075°N 118.8693°W
17	Mount Lyell	Sierra Nevada	13,120 ft 3998.9 m	1,926 ft 587 m	5.26 mi 8.46 km	37.7394°N 119.2716°W
18	Mount Dana	Sierra Nevada	13,063 ft 3981.5 m	2,437 ft 743 m	11.4 mi 18.35 km	37.8999°N 119.2211°W
19	Mount Conness	Sierra Nevada	12,649 ft 3855.5 m	2,650 ft 808 m	7.18 mi 11.55 km	37.9670°N 119.3213°W
20	Needham Mountain (Note: The elevation of Needham Mountain includes an adjustment of +1.602 m (5.26 ft) from NGVD 29 to NAVD 88.)	Sierra Nevada	12,545 ft 3824 m	1,840 ft 561 m	5.93 mi 9.54 km	36.4545°N 118.5373°W
21	Twin Peaks (Note: The elevation of Twin Peaks includes an adjustment of +1.717 m (5.63 ft) from NGVD 29 to NAVD 88.)	Sierra Nevada	12,329 ft 3758 m	2,143 ft 653 m	4.78 mi 7.7 km	38.0836°N 119.3588°W
22	Olancha Peak (Note: The summit of Olancha Peak is the highest point of the southern Sierra Nevada.)	Sierra Nevada	12,132 ft 3697.8 m	3,103 ft 946 m	14.84 mi 23.9 km	36.2652°N 118.1182°W
23	Eagle Peak	Sierra Nevada	11,853 ft 3612.8 m	2,358 ft 719 m	6.16 mi 9.92 km	38.1799°N 119.4086°W
24	Tower Peak (Note: The elevation of Tower Peak includes an adjustment of +1.644 m (5.39 ft) from NGVD 29 to NAVD 88.)	Sierra Nevada	11,760 ft 3585 m	2,183 ft 665 m	7.96 mi 12.81 km	38.1445°N 119.5477°W
25	Mount Patterson (Note: The summit of Mount Patterson is the highest point of the Sweetwater Mountains.) (Note: The elevation of Mount Patterson includes an adjustment of +1.734 m (5.69 ft) from NGVD 29 to NAVD 88.)	Sweetwater Mountains	11,679 ft 3560 m	4,173 ft 1272 m	18.5 mi 29.8 km	38.4366°N 119.3052°W
26	San Joaquin Mountain (Note: The summit elevation of San Joaquin Mountain includes a vertical offset of +0.61 m (2 ft) from the station benchmark.)	Sierra Nevada	11,608 ft 3538 m	1,706 ft 520 m	5.1 mi 8.21 km	37.7190°N 119.1061°W
27	Leavitt Peak	Sierra Nevada	11,573 ft 3527.6 m	2,069 ft 631 m	11.28 mi 18.15 km	38.2862°N 119.6513°W
28	Kern Peak	Sierra Nevada	11,520 ft 3511.2 m	2,580 ft 786 m	9.83 mi 15.82 km	36.3085°N 118.2879°W
29	San Gorgonio Mountain (Note: The summit of San Gorgonio Mountain is the highest point of the San Bernardino Mountains.) (Note: The elevation of San Gorgonio Mountain includes an adjustment of +1.303 m (4.27 ft) from NGVD 29 to NAVD 88.)	San Bernardino Mountains	11,503 ft 3506 m	8,294 ft 2528 m	162.5 mi 262 km	34.0992°N 116.8249°W
30	Sonora Peak (Note: The elevation of Sonora Peak includes an adjustment of +1.62 m (5.31 ft) from NGVD 29 to NAVD 88.)	Sierra Nevada	11,464 ft 3494.3 m	1,816 ft 554 m	4.75 mi 7.64 km	38.3538°N 119.6355°W
31	Waucoba Mountain (Note: The summit of Waucoba Mountain is the highest point of the Inyo Mountains.)	Inyo Mountains	11,128 ft 3391.8 m	3,943 ft 1202 m	20 mi 32.2 km	37.0220°N 118.0078°W
31	Glass Mountain (Note: The summit of Glass Mountain is the highest point of the Glass Mountain Ridge.)	Glass Mountain Ridge	11,128 ft 3391.8 m	3,210 ft 978 m	16.16 mi 26 km	37.7749°N 118.7085°W
33	Keynot Peak (Note: The elevation of Keynot Peak includes an adjustment of +1.347 m (4.42 ft) from NGVD 29 to NAVD 88.)	Inyo Mountains	11,105 ft 3385 m	3,064 ft 934 m	17.09 mi 27.5 km	36.7076°N 117.9626°W
34	Telescope Peak (Note: The summit of Telescope Peak is the highest point of the Panamint Range.)	Panamint Range	11,043 ft 3366 m	6,188 ft 1886 m	57.2 mi 92 km	36.1698°N 117.0892°W
35	Mammoth Mountain (Note: The elevation of Mammoth Mountain includes an adjustment of +1.766 m (5.79 ft) from NGVD 29 to NAVD 88.)	Sierra Nevada	11,036 ft 3364 m	1,680 ft 512 m	5.09 mi 8.19 km	37.6305°N 119.0326°W
36	Highland Peak (Note: The summit elevation of Highland Peak includes a vertical offset of +0.61 m (2 ft) from the station benchmark.)	Sierra Nevada	10,942 ft 3335.2 m	2,496 ft 761 m	12 mi 19.32 km	38.5437°N 119.7556°W
37	Freel Peak (Note: The summit of Freel Peak is the highest point of the Carson Range.)	Sierra Nevada	10,886 ft 3318 m	3,146 ft 959 m	22.9 mi 36.9 km	38.8575°N 119.9001°W
38	Mount Hoffmann	Sierra Nevada	10,855 ft 3308.5 m	2,310 ft 704 m	5.74 mi 9.24 km	37.8469°N 119.5105°W
39	San Jacinto Peak (Note: The summit of San Jacinto Peak is the highest point of the San Jacinto Mountains.)	San Jacinto Mountains	10,834 ft 3302.3 m	8,339 ft 2542 m	20.3 mi 32.7 km	33.8147°N 116.6794°W
40	Lassen Peak	Cascade Range	10,462 ft 3188.7 m	5,229 ft 1594 m	71.4 mi 114.9 km	40.4882°N 121.5050°W
41	Round Top	Sierra Nevada	10,390 ft 3167 m	2,561 ft 781 m	14.43 mi 23.2 km	38.6636°N 120.0010°W
42	Mount San Antonio (Note: The summit of Mount San Antonio is the highest point of the San Gabriel Mountains.) (Note: The elevation of Mount San Antonio includes an adjustment of +1.214 m (3.98 ft) from NGVD 29 to NAVD 88.)	San Gabriel Mountains	10,068 ft 3069 m	6,244 ft 1903 m	42.5 mi 68.4 km	34.2891°N 117.6463°W
43	Pyramid Peak	Sierra Nevada	9,985 ft 3043 m	2,603 ft 793 m	12.2 mi 19.63 km	38.8450°N 120.1579°W
44	Peak 9980 (Note: The elevation of Peak 9980 includes an adjustment of +1.369 m (4.49 ft) from NGVD 29 to NAVD 88.)	Sierra Nevada	9,985 ft 3043 m	1,680 ft 512 m	23.5 mi 37.8 km	35.9314°N 118.3311°W
45	Sugarloaf Mountain	San Bernardino Mountains	9,956 ft 3034.7 m	1,972 ft 601 m	5.04 mi 8.11 km	34.1989°N 116.8146°W
46	Eagle Peak (Note: The summit of Eagle Peak is the highest point of the Warner Mountains.)	Warner Mountains	9,895 ft 3016 m	4,362 ft 1330 m	87.4 mi 140.6 km	41.2835°N 120.2007°W
47	Mount Eddy (Note: The summit of Mount Eddy is the highest point of the Klamath Mountains.)	Klamath Mountains	9,037 ft 2754.6 m	5,125 ft 1562 m	14.58 mi 23.5 km	41.3196°N 122.4790°W
48	Thompson Peak (Note: The summit of Thompson Peak is the highest point of the Salmon Mountains.)	Klamath Mountains	8,999 ft 2743 m	3,934 ft 1199 m	37 mi 59.5 km	41.0006°N 123.0484°W
49	Tin Mountain	Panamint Range	8,961 ft 2731.4 m	4,013 ft 1223 m	28 mi 45.1 km	36.8867°N 117.4560°W
50	Mount Pinos (Note: The summit of Mount Pinos is the highest point of the San Emigdio Mountains.)	San Emigdio Mountains	8,847 ft 2696.5 m	4,800 ft 1463 m	82.9 mi 133.5 km	34.8128°N 119.1454°W

== Most prominent summits ==
Of the most prominent summits of California, only Mount Whitney exceeds 3000 meters (9843 feet) of topographic prominence. Five peaks exceed 2000 meters (6562 feet), nine peaks are ultra-prominent summits with more than 1500 meters (4921 feet), and 35 peaks exceed 1000 meters (3281 feet) of topographic prominence.

The 50 most topographically prominent summits of California
Rank	Mountain peak	Mountain range	Elevation	Prominence	Isolation	Location
1	Mount Whitney	Sierra Nevada	14,505 ft 4421 m	10,080 ft 3072 m	1,646 mi 2,649 km	36.5786°N 118.2920°W
2	Mount Shasta	Cascade Range	14,179 ft 4321.8 m	9,772 ft 2979 m	335 mi 539 km	41.4092°N 122.1949°W
3	San Jacinto Peak	San Jacinto Mountains	10,834 ft 3302.3 m	8,339 ft 2542 m	20.3 mi 32.7 km	33.8147°N 116.6794°W
4	San Gorgonio Mountain	San Bernardino Mountains	11,503 ft 3506 m	8,294 ft 2528 m	162.5 mi 262 km	34.0992°N 116.8249°W
5	White Mountain Peak	White Mountains	14,252 ft 4344 m	7,196 ft 2193 m	67.4 mi 108.6 km	37.6341°N 118.2557°W
6	Mount San Antonio	San Gabriel Mountains	10,068 ft 3069 m	6,244 ft 1903 m	42.5 mi 68.4 km	34.2891°N 117.6463°W
7	Telescope Peak	Panamint Range	11,043 ft 3366 m	6,188 ft 1886 m	57.2 mi 92 km	36.1698°N 117.0892°W
8	Lassen Peak	Cascade Range	10,462 ft 3188.7 m	5,229 ft 1594 m	71.4 mi 114.9 km	40.4882°N 121.5050°W
9	Mount Eddy	Klamath Mountains-California Coast Ranges	9,037 ft 2754.6 m	5,125 ft 1562 m	14.58 mi 23.5 km	41.3196°N 122.4790°W
10	Mount Linn (Note: The summit of Mount Linn is the highest point of the Northern Inner Coast Range.) (Note: The elevation of Mount Linn includes an adjustment of +1.148 m (3.77 ft) from NGVD 29 to NAVD 88.)	Northern Inner Coast Range-California Coast Ranges	8,098 ft 2468 m	4,854 ft 1480 m	61.5 mi 98.9 km	40.0365°N 122.8542°W
11	Mount Pinos	San Emigdio Mountains	8,847 ft 2696.5 m	4,800 ft 1463 m	82.9 mi 133.5 km	34.8128°N 119.1454°W
12	Junipero Serra Peak (Note: The summit of Junipero Serra Peak is the highest point of the Santa Lucia Range.) (Note: The elevation of Junipero Serra Peak includes an adjustment of +0.971 m (3.19 ft) from NGVD 29 to NAVD 88.)	Santa Lucia Range	5,865 ft 1788 m	4,447 ft 1355 m	131.8 mi 212 km	36.1457°N 121.4191°W
13	Santiago Peak (Note: The summit of Santiago Peak is the highest point of the Santa Ana Mountains.)	Santa Ana Mountains	5,690 ft 1734.36 m	4,397 ft 1340 m	33.6 mi 54.1 km	33.7105°N 117.5342°W
14	Eagle Peak	Warner Mountains	9,895 ft 3016 m	4,362 ft 1330 m	87.4 mi 140.6 km	41.2835°N 120.2007°W
15	Clark Mountain (Note: The summit of Clark Mountain is the highest point of the Clark Mountain Range.)	Clark Mountain Range	7,933 ft 2418.1 m	4,255 ft 1297 m	29.1 mi 46.9 km	35.5256°N 115.5887°W
16	Mount Patterson	Sweetwater Mountains	11,679 ft 3560 m	4,173 ft 1272 m	18.5 mi 29.8 km	38.4366°N 119.3052°W
17	Toro Peak (Note: The summit of Toro Peak is the highest point of the San Rosa Mountains.)	San Rosa Mountains	8,716 ft 2656.7 m	4,016 ft 1224 m	20.7 mi 33.4 km	33.5236°N 116.4258°W
18	Tin Mountain	Panamint Range	8,961 ft 2731.4 m	4,013 ft 1223 m	28 mi 45.1 km	36.8867°N 117.4560°W
19	Mount Ritter	Sierra Nevada	13,149 ft 4008 m	3,990 ft 1216 m	22 mi 35.4 km	37.6891°N 119.1996°W
20	Waucoba Mountain	Inyo Mountains	11,128 ft 3391.8 m	3,943 ft 1202 m	20 mi 32.2 km	37.0220°N 118.0078°W
21	Thompson Peak	Klamath Mountains	8,999 ft 2743 m	3,934 ft 1199 m	37 mi 59.5 km	41.0006°N 123.0484°W
22	Double Mountain (Note: The summit of Double Mountain is the highest point of the Tehachapi Mountains.)	Tehachapi Mountains	7,993 ft 2436.2 m	3,841 ft 1171 m	28.8 mi 46.3 km	35.0333°N 118.4867°W
23	Kingston Peak (Note: The summit of Kingston Peak is the highest point of the Kingston Range.) (Note: The elevation of Kingston Peak includes an adjustment of +0.902 m (2.96 ft) from NGVD 29 to NAVD 88.)	Kingston Range	7,339 ft 2237 m	3,743 ft 1141 m	21.9 mi 35.2 km	35.7267°N 115.9156°W
24	Pyramid Peak	Amargosa Range	8,844 ft 2695.7 m	3,659 ft 1115 m	21.6 mi 34.7 km	36.3918°N 116.6120°W
25	Maturango Peak (Note: The summit of Maturango Peak is the highest point of the Argus Range.) (Note: The summit elevation of Maturango Peak includes a vertical offset of +0.914 m (3 ft) from the station benchmark.)	Argus Range	8,844 ft 2695.7 m	3,659 ft 1115 m	21.6 mi 34.7 km	36.1200°N 117.4955°W
26	Dry Mountain (Note: The elevation of Dry Mountain includes an adjustment of +1.205 m (3.95 ft) from NGVD 29 to NAVD 88.)	Panamint Range	8,678 ft 2645 m	3,614 ft 1102 m	8 mi 12.88 km	36.9090°N 117.5978°W
27	Nopah Peak (Note: The summit of Nopah Peak is the highest point of the Nopah Range.) (Note: The elevation of Nopah Peak includes an adjustment of +0.791 m (2.6 ft) from NGVD 29 to NAVD 88.)	Nopah Range	8,437 ft 2572 m	3,520 ft 1073 m	25.1 mi 40.4 km	36.0064°N 116.0806°W
28	Piute Peak	Sierra Nevada	8,437 ft 2571.5 m	3,520 ft 1073 m	25.1 mi 40.4 km	35.4483°N 118.3849°W
29	San Benito Mountain (Note: The summit of San Benito Mountain is the highest point of the Diablo Range.)	Diablo Range	5,267 ft 1605.34 m	3,491 ft 1064 m	43.2 mi 69.6 km	36.3696°N 120.6447°W
30	Loma Prieta (Note: The summit of Loma Prieta is the highest point of the Santa Cruz Mountains.) (Note: The summit elevation of Loma Prieta includes a vertical offset of +0.305 m (1 ft) from the station benchmark.)	Santa Cruz Mountains	3,791 ft 1155.4 m	3,431 ft 1046 m	18.93 mi 30.5 km	37.1110°N 121.8442°W
31	New York Mountain (Note: The summit of New York Mountain is the highest point of the New York Mountains.) (Note: The elevation of New York Mountain includes an adjustment of +1.055 m (3.46 ft) from NGVD 29 to NAVD 88.)	New York Mountains	7,539 ft 2298 m	3,350 ft 1021 m	23.7 mi 38.2 km	35.2587°N 115.3113°W
32	Granite Mountain (Note: The summit of Granite Mountain is the highest point of the Granite Mountains.) (Note: The elevation of Granite Mountain includes an adjustment of +0.714 m (2.34 ft) from NGVD 29 to NAVD 88.)	Granite Mountains	4,359 ft 1329 m	3,346 ft 1020 m	19.17 mi 30.9 km	33.9702°N 115.0731°W
33	Funeral Peak (Note: The elevation of Funeral Peak includes an adjustment of +0.868 m (2.85 ft) from NGVD 29 to NAVD 88.)	Amargosa Range	6,387 ft 1947 m	3,324 ft 1013 m	19.69 mi 31.7 km	36.1032°N 116.6240°W
34	Breckenridge Mountain	Sierra Nevada	7,577 ft 2309.6 m	3,320 ft 1012 m	11.03 mi 17.75 km	35.4512°N 118.5871°W
35	Avawatz Mountain (Note: The summit of Avawatz Mountain is the highest point of the Avawatz Mountains.)	Avawatz Mountains	6,158 ft 1876.9 m	3,305 ft 1007 m	26.7 mi 43 km	35.5127°N 116.3316°W
36	Ord Mountain (Note: The summit of Ord Mountain is the highest point of the Ord Mountains.) (Note: The elevation of Ord Mountain includes an adjustment of +0.892 m (2.93 ft) from NGVD 29 to NAVD 88.)	Ord Mountains	6,312 ft 1924 m	3,259 ft 993 m	22.8 mi 36.7 km	34.6749°N 116.8151°W
37	Glass Mountain	Glass Mountain Ridge	11,128 ft 3391.8 m	3,210 ft 978 m	16.16 mi 26 km	37.7749°N 118.7085°W
38	Freel Peak	Sierra Nevada	10,886 ft 3318 m	3,146 ft 959 m	22.9 mi 36.9 km	38.8575°N 119.9001°W
39	Copernicus Peak (Note: The elevation of Copernicus Peak includes an adjustment of +0.924 m (3.03 ft) from NGVD 29 to NAVD 88.)	Diablo Range	4,383 ft 1336 m	3,120 ft 951 m	65.2 mi 104.9 km	37.3468°N 121.6300°W
40	Mount Diablo	Diablo Range-California Coast Ranges	3,864 ft 1177.7 m	3,119 ft 951 m	32.8 mi 52.8 km	37.8817°N 121.9142°W
41	Olancha Peak	Sierra Nevada	12,132 ft 3697.8 m	3,103 ft 946 m	14.84 mi 23.9 km	36.2652°N 118.1182°W
42	Keynot Peak	Inyo Mountains	11,105 ft 3385 m	3,064 ft 934 m	17.09 mi 27.5 km	36.7076°N 117.9626°W
43	Boulder Peak (Note: The summit of Boulder Peak is the highest point of the Marble Mountains.)	Klamath Mountains	8,302 ft 2530.5 m	2,919 ft 890 m	30.1 mi 48.4 km	41.5793°N 123.0919°W
44	North Palisade	Sierra Nevada	14,248 ft 4343 m	2,894 ft 882 m	32.2 mi 51.8 km	37.0943°N 118.5145°W
45	Mount Conness	Sierra Nevada	12,649 ft 3855.5 m	2,650 ft 808 m	7.18 mi 11.55 km	37.9670°N 119.3213°W
46	Mount Morgan	Sierra Nevada	13,758 ft 4193.4 m	2,648 ft 807 m	9.86 mi 15.87 km	37.4053°N 118.7329°W
47	Pyramid Peak	Sierra Nevada	9,985 ft 3043 m	2,603 ft 793 m	12.2 mi 19.63 km	38.8450°N 120.1579°W
48	Mount Gabb	Sierra Nevada	13,747 ft 4190 m	2,601 ft 793 m	4.28 mi 6.89 km	37.3769°N 118.8025°W
49	Kern Peak	Sierra Nevada	11,520 ft 3511.2 m	2,580 ft 786 m	9.83 mi 15.82 km	36.3085°N 118.2879°W
50	Mount Humphreys	Sierra Nevada	13,992 ft 4265 m	2,563 ft 781 m	14.71 mi 23.7 km	37.2705°N 118.6730°W

== Most isolated major summits ==
Of the most isolated major summits of California, Mount Whitney exceeds 2000 kilometers (1243 miles) of topographic isolation, Mount Shasta exceeds 500 kilometers (310.7 miles), four peaks exceed 200 kilometers (124.3 miles), and nine peaks exceed 100 kilometers (62.14 miles) of topographic isolation.

The 50 most topographically isolated summits of California with at least 500 meters of topographic prominence
Rank	Mountain peak	Mountain range	Elevation	Prominence	Isolation	Location
1	Mount Whitney	Sierra Nevada	4421 m 14,505 ft	3072 m 10,080 ft	2,649 km 1,646 mi	36.5786°N 118.2920°W
2	Mount Shasta	Cascade Range	4321.8 m 14,179 ft	2979 m 9,772 ft	539 km 335 mi	41.4092°N 122.1949°W
3	San Gorgonio Mountain	San Bernardino Mountains	3506 m 11,503 ft	2528 m 8,294 ft	262 km 162.5 mi	34.0992°N 116.8249°W
4	Junipero Serra Peak	Santa Lucia Range	1788 m 5,865 ft	1355 m 4,447 ft	212 km 131.8 mi	36.1457°N 121.4191°W
5	Eagle Peak	Warner Mountains	3016 m 9,895 ft	1330 m 4,362 ft	140.6 km 87.4 mi	41.2835°N 120.2007°W
6	Mount Pinos	San Emigdio Mountains	2696.5 m 8,847 ft	1463 m 4,800 ft	133.5 km 82.9 mi	34.8128°N 119.1454°W
7	Lassen Peak	Cascade Range	3188.7 m 10,462 ft	1594 m 5,229 ft	114.9 km 71.4 mi	40.4882°N 121.5050°W
8	White Mountain Peak	White Mountains	4344 m 14,252 ft	2193 m 7,196 ft	108.6 km 67.4 mi	37.6341°N 118.2557°W
9	Copernicus Peak (Note: The elevation of Copernicus Peak includes an adjustment of +0.924 m (3.03 ft) from NGVD 29 to NAVD 88.)	Diablo Range	1336 m 4,383 ft	951 m 3,120 ft	104.9 km 65.2 mi	37.3468°N 121.6300°W
10	Mount Linn	Yolla Bolly Mountains	2468 m 8,098 ft	1480 m 4,854 ft	98.9 km 61.5 mi	40.0365°N 122.8542°W
11	Telescope Peak	Panamint Range	3366 m 11,043 ft	1886 m 6,188 ft	92 km 57.2 mi	36.1698°N 117.0892°W
12	Mount Orizaba (Note: The summit of Mount Orizaba is the highest point of Santa Catalina Island.) (Note: The elevation of Mount Orizaba includes an adjustment of +0.728 m (2.39 ft) from NGVD 29 to NAVD 88.)	Santa Catalina Island	648 m 2,127 ft	648 m 2,127 ft	79.4 km 49.4 mi	33.3751°N 118.4196°W
13	San Benito Mountain	Diablo Range	1605.34 m 5,267 ft	1064 m 3,491 ft	69.6 km 43.2 mi	36.3696°N 120.6447°W
14	Mount San Antonio	San Gabriel Mountains	3069 m 10,068 ft	1903 m 6,244 ft	68.4 km 42.5 mi	34.2891°N 117.6463°W
15	Thompson Peak	Klamath Mountains	2743 m 8,999 ft	1199 m 3,934 ft	59.5 km 37 mi	41.0006°N 123.0484°W
16	Thirst Benchmark (Note: The summit of Thirst Benchmark is the highest point of San Clemente Island.)	San Clemente Island	600 m 1,969 ft	600 m 1,969 ft	54.4 km 33.8 mi	32.8836°N 118.4508°W
17	Santiago Peak	Santa Ana Mountains	1734.36 m 5,690 ft	1340 m 4,397 ft	54.1 km 33.6 mi	33.7105°N 117.5342°W
18	Mount Diablo	Diablo Range	1177.7 m 3,864 ft	951 m 3,119 ft	52.8 km 32.8 mi	37.8817°N 121.9142°W
19	North Palisade	Sierra Nevada	4343 m 14,248 ft	882 m 2,894 ft	51.8 km 32.2 mi	37.0943°N 118.5145°W
20	Mount Tamalpais West Peak (Note: The summit of Mount Tamalpais West Peak is the highest point of the Marin Hills.) (Note: The elevation of Mount Tamalpais West Peak includes an adjustment of +0.833 m (2.73 ft) from NGVD 29 to NAVD 88.)	Marin Hills	786 m 2,580 ft	750 m 2,462 ft	51.7 km 32.1 mi	37.9238°N 122.5967°W
21	Devils Peak (Note: The summit of Devils Peak is the highest point of Santa Cruz Island and the Channel Islands of California.) (Note: The elevation of Devils Peak includes an adjustment of +0.76 m (2.49 ft) from NGVD 29 to NAVD 88.)	Santa Cruz Island	755 m 2,478 ft	755 m 2,478 ft	50.1 km 31.1 mi	34.0292°N 119.7844°W
22	Boulder Peak	Klamath Mountains	2530.5 m 8,302 ft	890 m 2,919 ft	48.4 km 30.1 mi	41.5793°N 123.0919°W
23	Clark Mountain	Clark Mountain Range	2418.1 m 7,933 ft	1297 m 4,255 ft	46.9 km 29.1 mi	35.5256°N 115.5887°W
24	Double Mountain	Tehachapi Mountains	2436.2 m 7,993 ft	1171 m 3,841 ft	46.3 km 28.8 mi	35.0333°N 118.4867°W
25	Tin Mountain	Panamint Range	2731.4 m 8,961 ft	1223 m 4,013 ft	45.1 km 28 mi	36.8867°N 117.4560°W
26	Avawatz Mountain	Avawatz Mountains	1876.9 m 6,158 ft	1007 m 3,305 ft	43 km 26.7 mi	35.5127°N 116.3316°W
27	Piute Peak	Sierra Nevada	2571.5 m 8,437 ft	1073 m 3,520 ft	40.4 km 25.1 mi	35.4483°N 118.3849°W
28	Pyramid Peak	Amargosa Range	2298 m 7,539 ft	1021 m 3,350 ft	38.2 km 23.7 mi	36.3918°N 116.6120°W
29	New York Mountain	New York Mountains	2298 m 7,539 ft	1021 m 3,350 ft	38.2 km 23.7 mi	35.2587°N 115.3113°W
30	Peak 9980	Sierra Nevada	3043 m 9,985 ft	512 m 1,680 ft	37.8 km 23.5 mi	35.9314°N 118.3311°W
31	Freel Peak	Sierra Nevada	3318 m 10,886 ft	959 m 3,146 ft	36.9 km 22.9 mi	38.8575°N 119.9001°W
32	Ord Mountain	Ord Mountains	1924 m 6,312 ft	993 m 3,259 ft	36.7 km 22.8 mi	34.6749°N 116.8151°W
33	Mount Ritter	Sierra Nevada	4008 m 13,149 ft	1216 m 3,990 ft	35.4 km 22 mi	37.6891°N 119.1996°W
34	Kingston Peak	Kingston Range	2237 m 7,339 ft	1141 m 3,743 ft	35.2 km 21.9 mi	35.7267°N 115.9156°W
35	Maturango Peak	Argus Range	2695.7 m 8,844 ft	1115 m 3,659 ft	34.7 km 21.6 mi	36.1200°N 117.4955°W
36	Toro Peak	San Rosa Mountains	2656.7 m 8,716 ft	1224 m 4,016 ft	33.4 km 20.7 mi	33.5236°N 116.4258°W
37	San Jacinto Peak	San Jacinto Mountains	3302.3 m 10,834 ft	2542 m 8,339 ft	32.7 km 20.3 mi	33.8147°N 116.6794°W
38	Waucoba Mountain	Inyo Mountains	3391.8 m 11,128 ft	1202 m 3,943 ft	32.2 km 20 mi	37.0220°N 118.0078°W
39	Funeral Peak	Amargosa Range	1947 m 6,387 ft	1013 m 3,324 ft	31.7 km 19.69 mi	36.1032°N 116.6240°W
40	Granite Mountain	Granite Mountains	1329 m 4,359 ft	1020 m 3,346 ft	30.9 km 19.17 mi	33.9702°N 115.0731°W
41	Loma Prieta	Santa Cruz Mountains	1155.4 m 3,791 ft	1046 m 3,431 ft	30.5 km 18.93 mi	37.1110°N 121.8442°W
42	Mount Patterson	Sweetwater Mountains	3560 m 11,679 ft	1272 m 4,173 ft	29.8 km 18.5 mi	38.4366°N 119.3052°W
43	Nopah Peak	Nopah Range	3385 m 11,105 ft	934 m 3,064 ft	27.5 km 17.09 mi	36.0064°N 116.0806°W
44	Keynot Peak	Inyo Mountains	3385 m 11,105 ft	934 m 3,064 ft	27.5 km 17.09 mi	36.7076°N 117.9626°W
45	Glass Mountain	Glass Mountain Ridge	3391.8 m 11,128 ft	978 m 3,210 ft	26 km 16.16 mi	37.7749°N 118.7085°W
46	Olancha Peak	Sierra Nevada	3697.8 m 12,132 ft	946 m 3,103 ft	23.9 km 14.84 mi	36.2652°N 118.1182°W
47	Mount Humphreys	Sierra Nevada	4265 m 13,992 ft	781 m 2,563 ft	23.7 km 14.71 mi	37.2705°N 118.6730°W
48	Mount Eddy	Klamath Mountains	2754.6 m 9,037 ft	1562 m 5,125 ft	23.5 km 14.58 mi	41.3196°N 122.4790°W
49	Round Top	Sierra Nevada	3167 m 10,390 ft	781 m 2,561 ft	23.2 km 14.43 mi	38.6636°N 120.0010°W
50	Pyramid Peak	Sierra Nevada	3043.3 m 9,985 ft	793 m 2,603 ft	19.63 km 12.2 mi	38.8450°N 120.1579°W

== Gallery ==
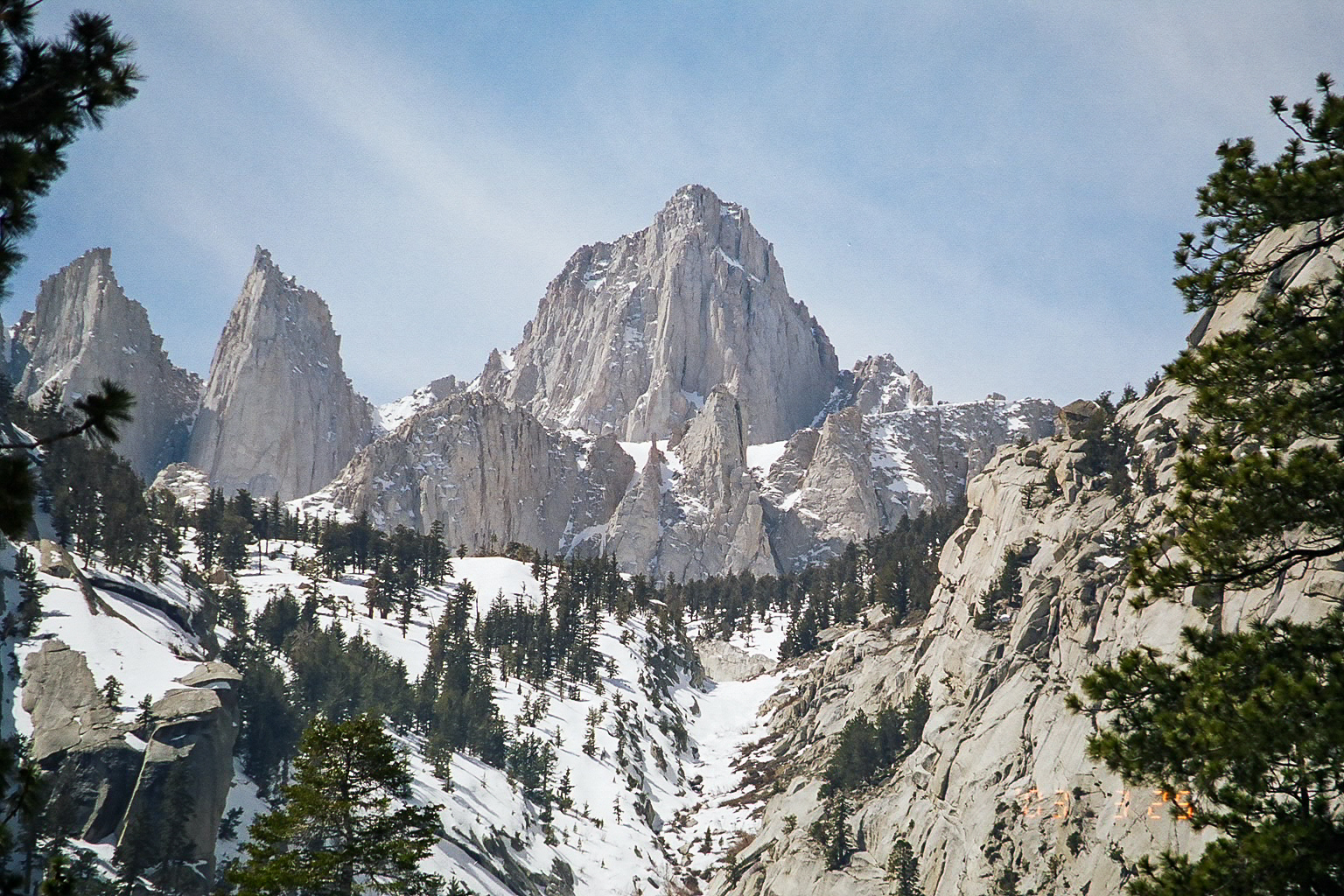
Mount Whitney is the highest summit of the Sierra Nevada, the State of California, and the contiguous United States.

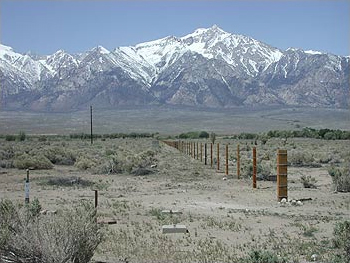
Mount Williamson is the second highest mountain peak of California.

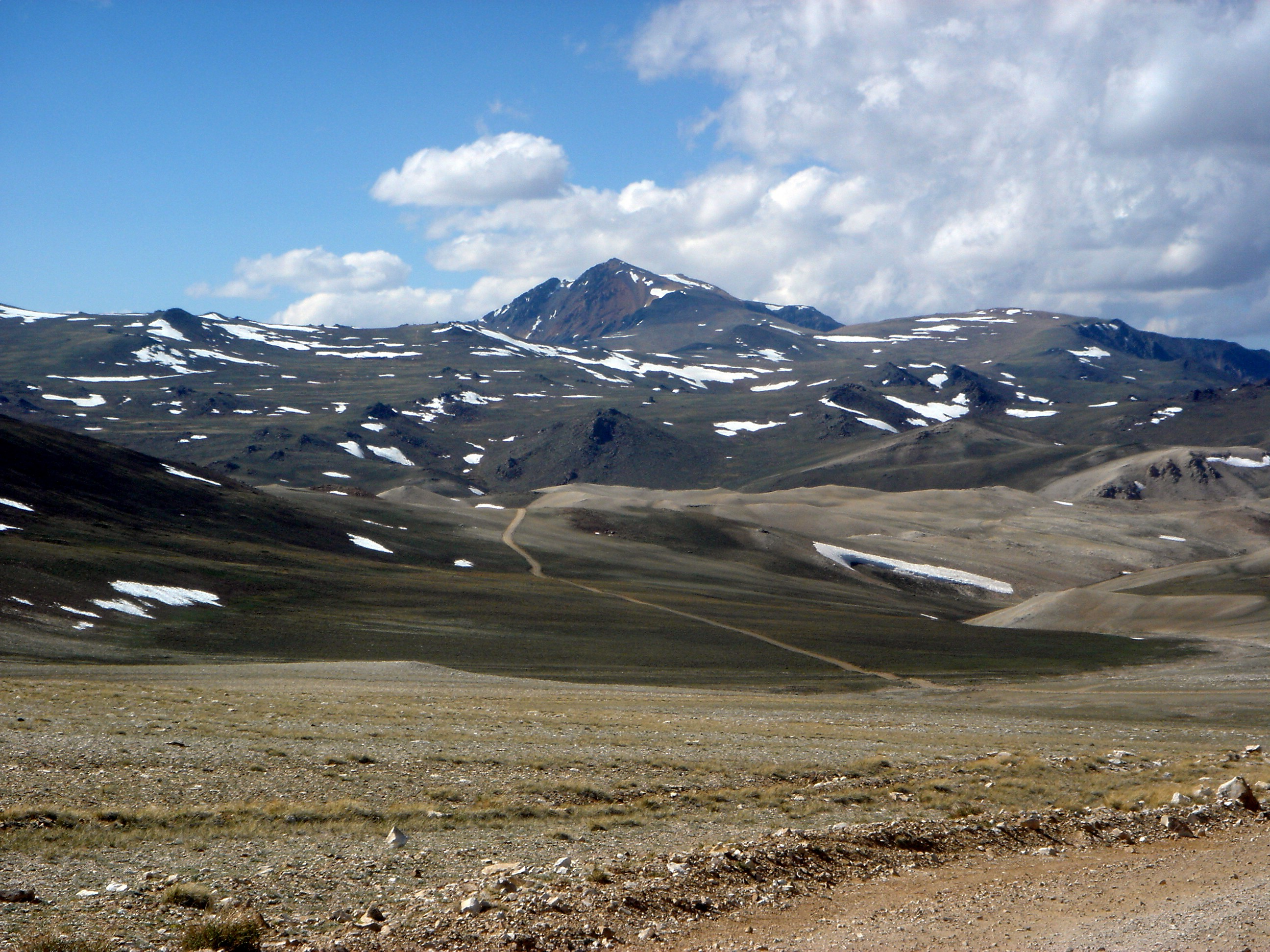
White Mountain Peak is the highest summit of the White Mountains and is the highest point within the Great Basin.

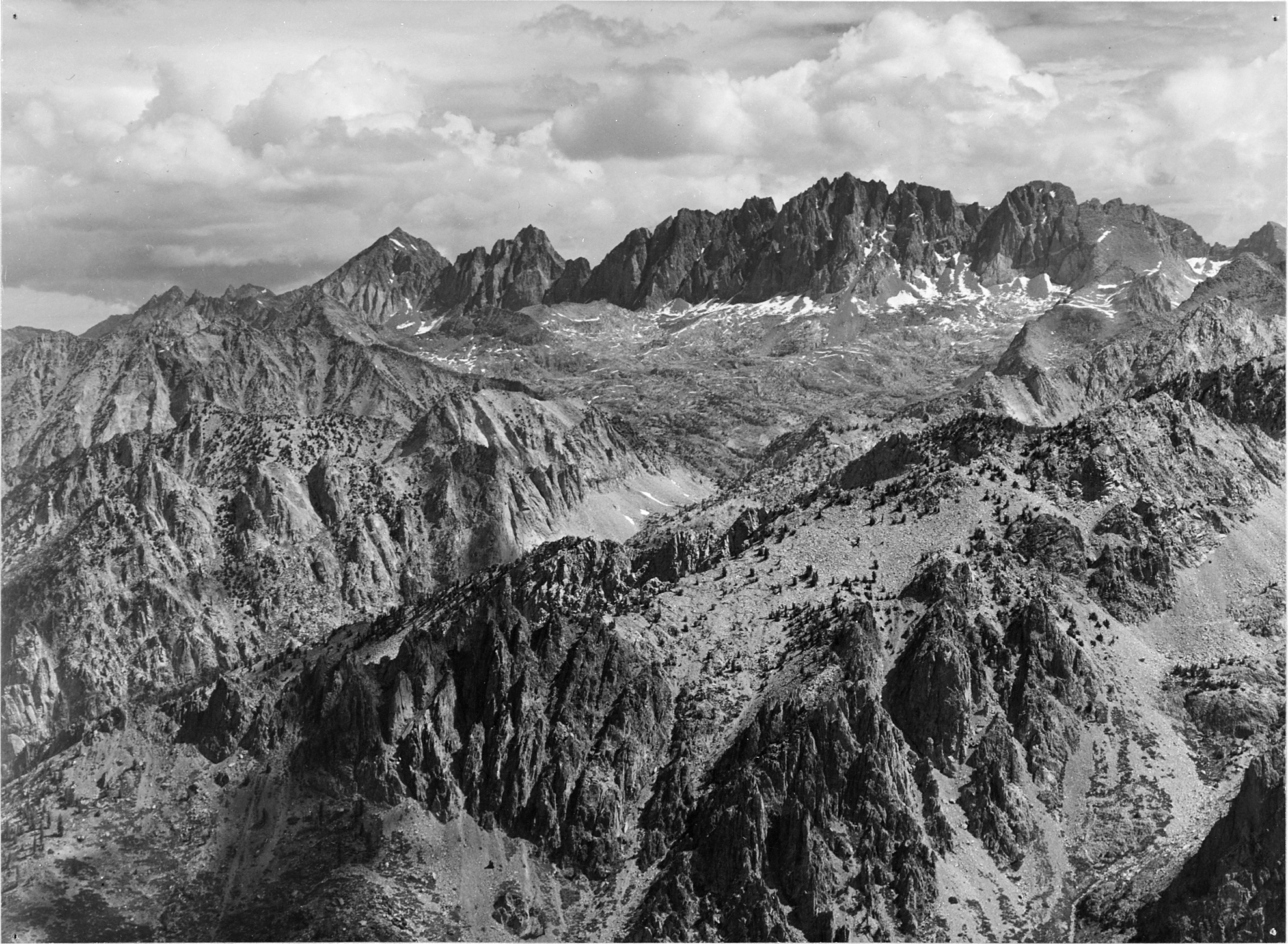
North Palisade is the highest summit of the Palisades of the Sierra Nevada.

The stratovolcano Mount Shasta is the second most topographically prominent California mountain peak.

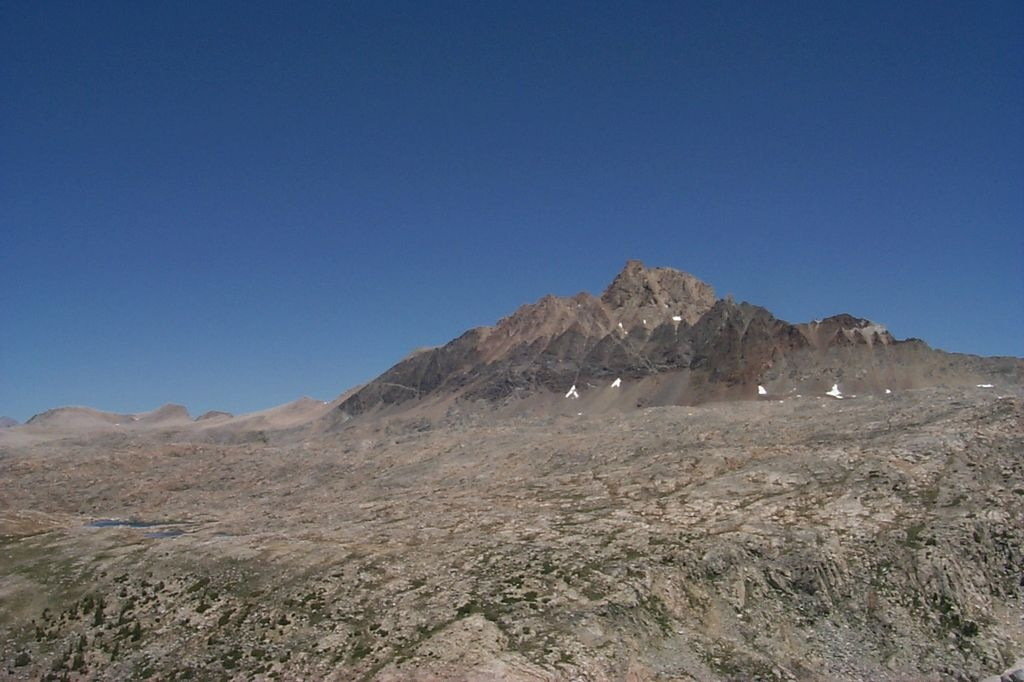
Mount Humphreys in the Sierra Nevada.

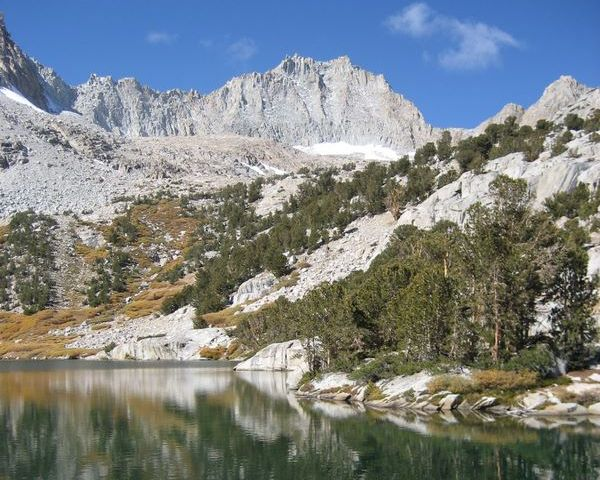
Mount Darwin is the highest summit of the Evolution Peaks of the Sierra Nevada.

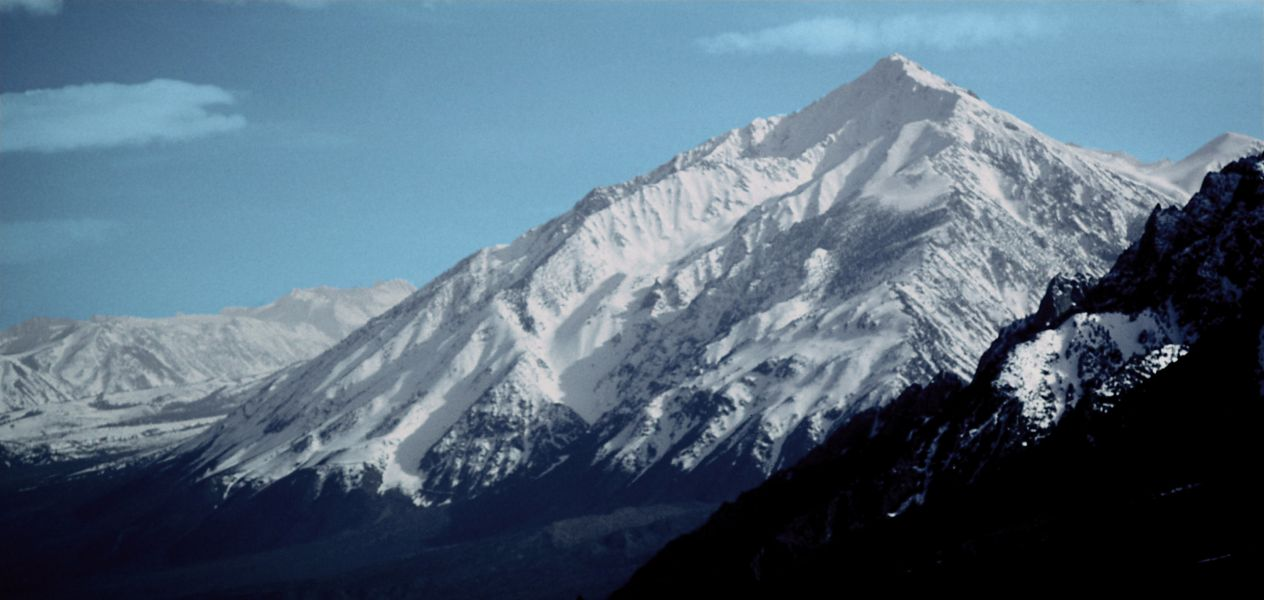
Mount Tom in the Sierra Nevada.

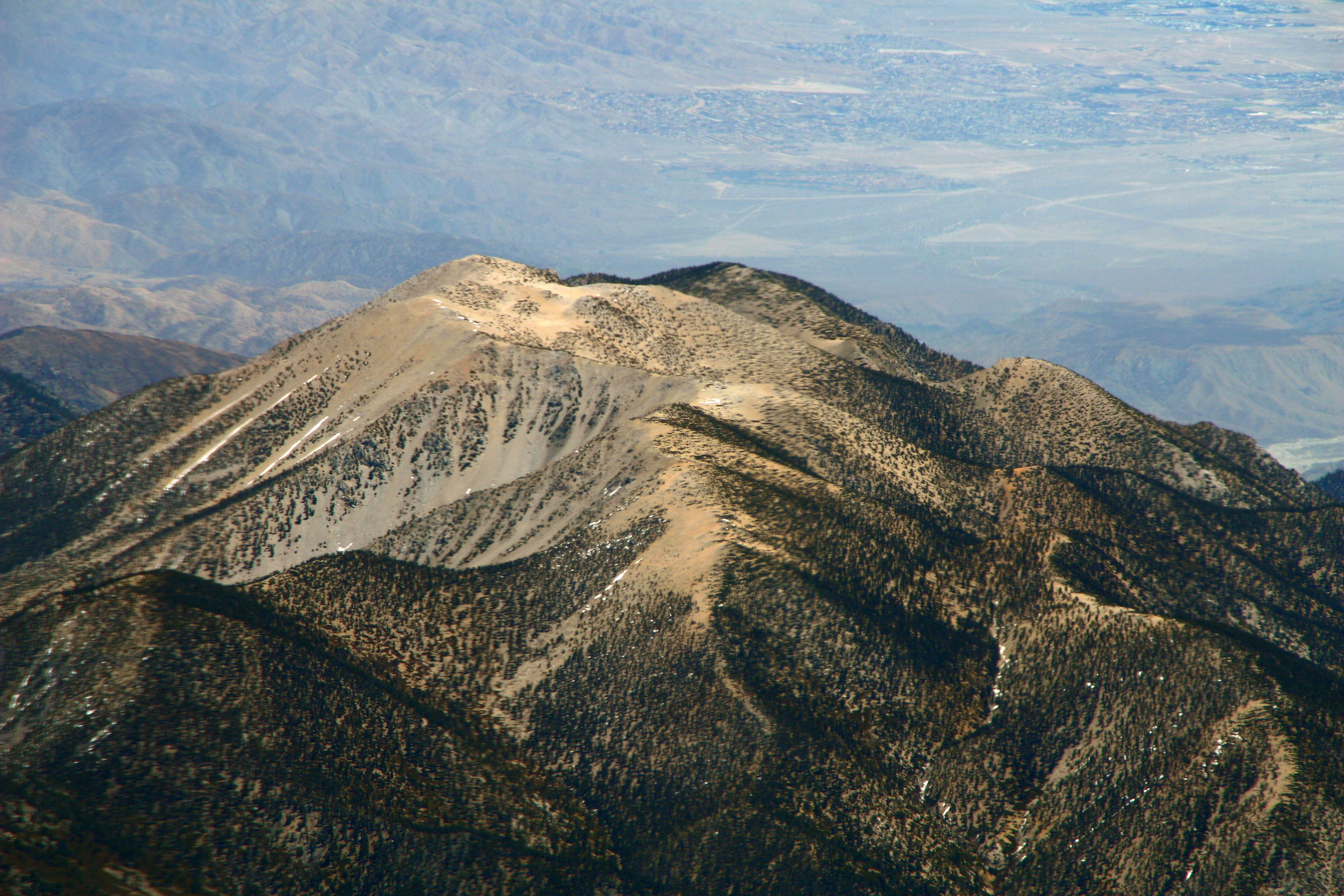
San Gorgonio Mountain is the highest summit of the San Bernardino Mountains and the third most topographically isolated California peak.

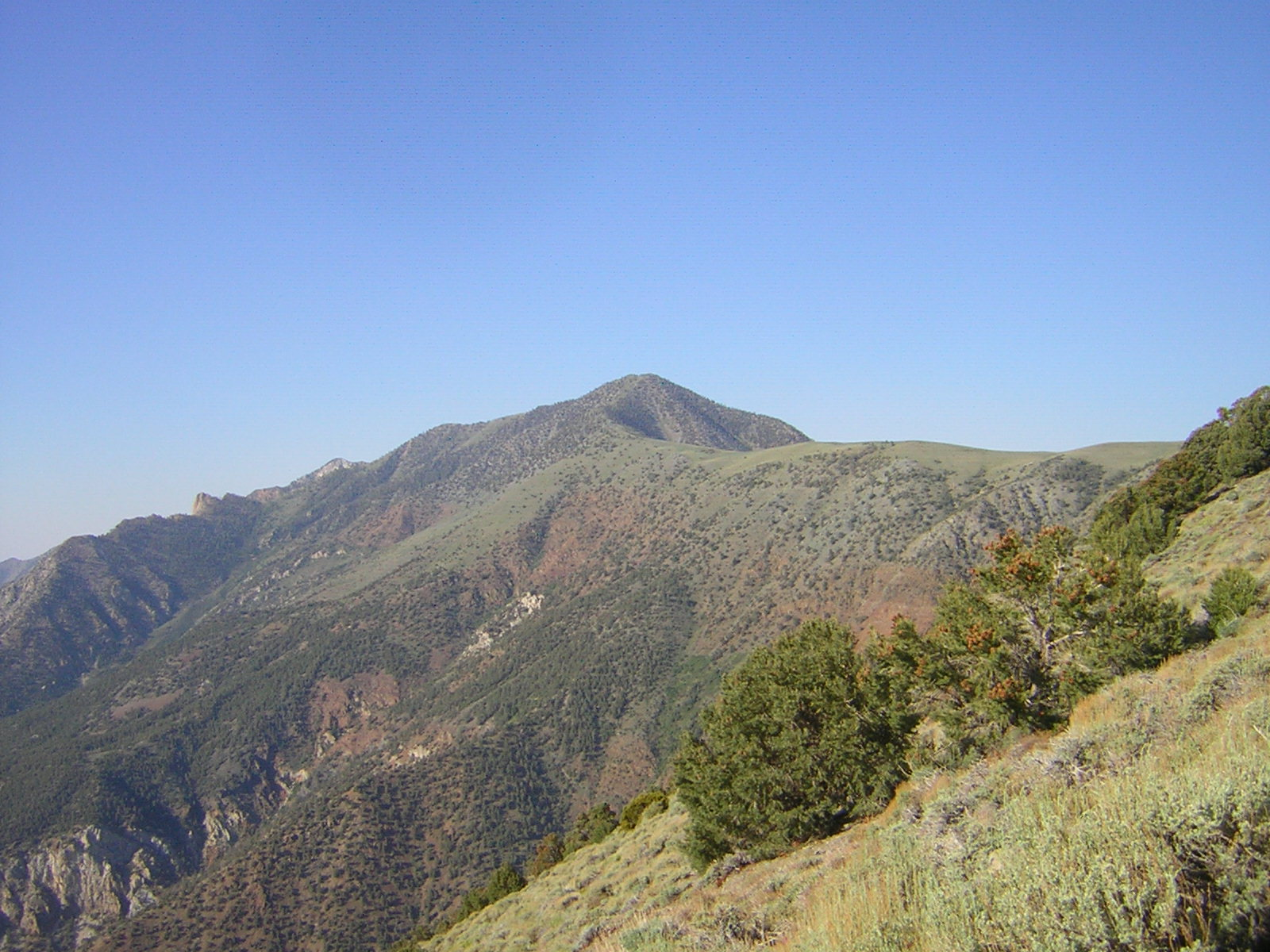
Telescope Peak is the highest summit of the Panamint Range.

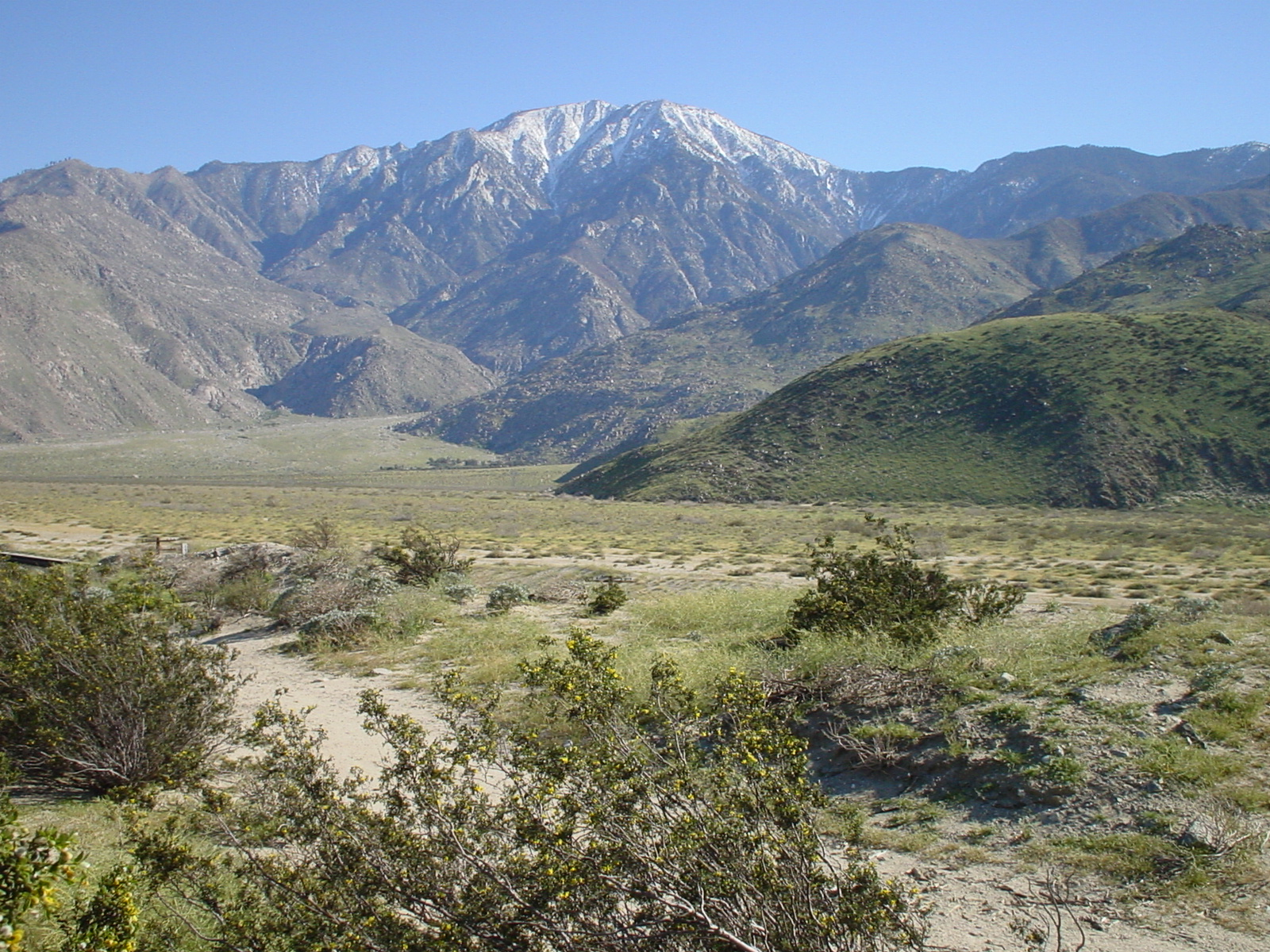
San Jacinto Peak is the highest summit of the San Jacinto Mountains.

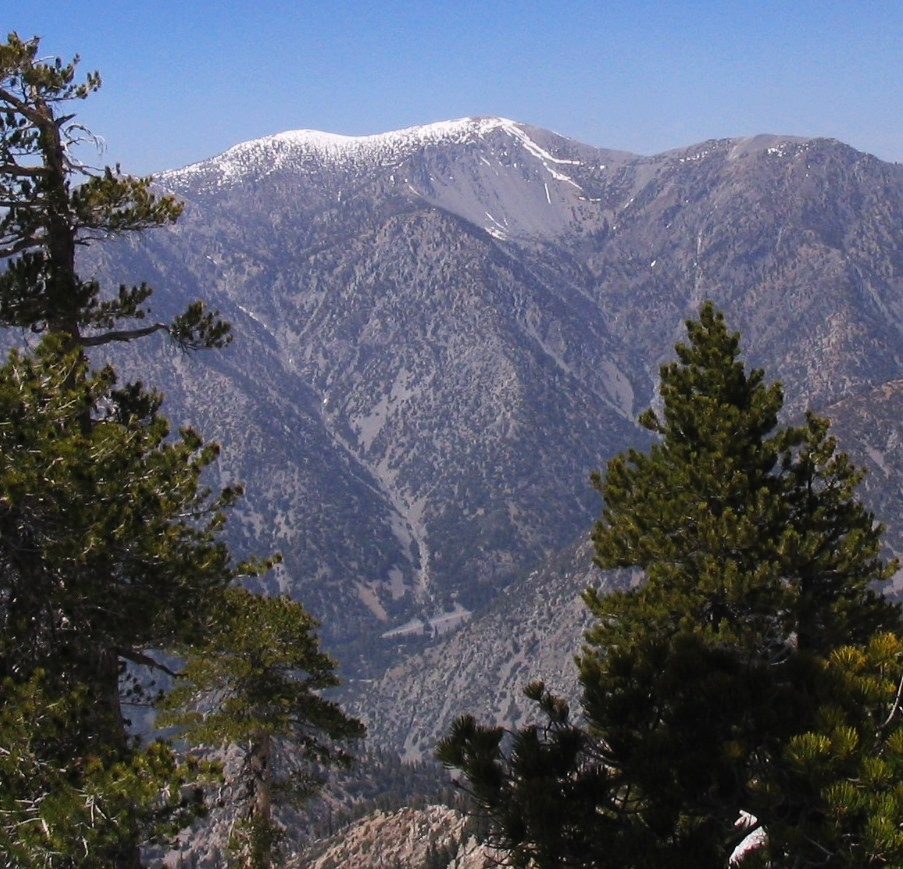
Mount San Antonio is the highest summit of the San Gabriel Mountains.

== See also ==
- List of mountain peaks of North America
  - List of mountain peaks of Greenland
  - List of mountain peaks of Canada
  - List of mountain peaks of the Rocky Mountains
  - List of mountain peaks of the United States
    - List of mountain peaks of Alaska
    - List of mountain peaks of Arizona
      - List of mountains of California
      - List of California fourteeners
      - List of mountain ranges of California
    - List of mountain peaks of Colorado
    - List of mountain peaks of Hawaiʻi
    - List of mountain peaks of Idaho
    - List of mountain peaks of Montana
    - List of mountain peaks of Nevada
    - List of mountain peaks of New Mexico
    - List of mountain peaks of Oregon
    - List of mountain peaks of Utah
    - List of mountain peaks of Washington (state)
    - List of mountain peaks of Wyoming
  - List of mountain peaks of México
  - List of mountain peaks of Central America
  - List of mountain peaks of the Caribbean
- California
  - Geography of California
    - Category:Mountains of California
      - commons:Category:Mountains of California
- Physical geography
  - Topography
    - Topographic elevation
    - Topographic prominence
    - Topographic isolation Baltic Peak
