= Maturango =

Maturango may refer to:

- Maturango Museum in Ridgecrest, California
- Maturango Peak in the Argus Range
