= Tin Mountain =

Mountain in California, United States

Tin Mountain, California
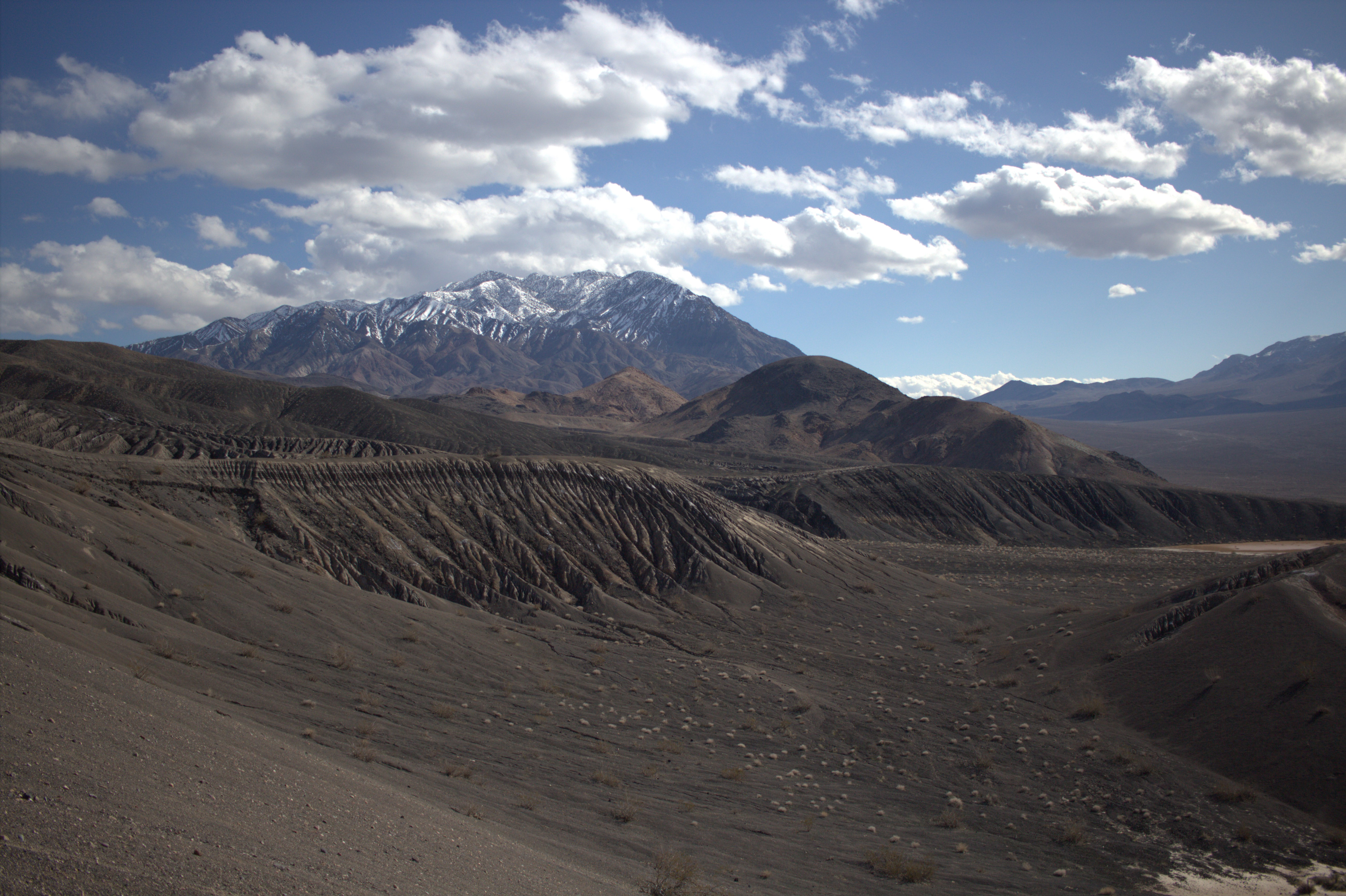
- Tin Mountain viewed from Ubehebe Crater.

Highest point
- Elevation: 8,953 ft (2,729 m)
- Prominence: 3,993 ft (1,217 m)
- Isolation: 28.05 mi (45.14 km)
- Coordinates: 36°53′12″N 117°27′22″W

Geography
- Location within California
- Country: United States
- State: California
- County: Inyo
- Protected area: Death Valley National Park
- Parent range: Panamint Range
- Topo map: USGS Tin Mountain

Geology
- Mountain type: Fault block
- Rock type: Sedimentary rock

Tin Mountain is an 8,953-foot (2,729 m) summit in the Panamint Range in northern Death Valley National Park, California, located north of Teakettle Junction.

== See also ==
- List of mountain peaks of California
