= Mount Morgan (Inyo County, California) =

Mountain in the state of California

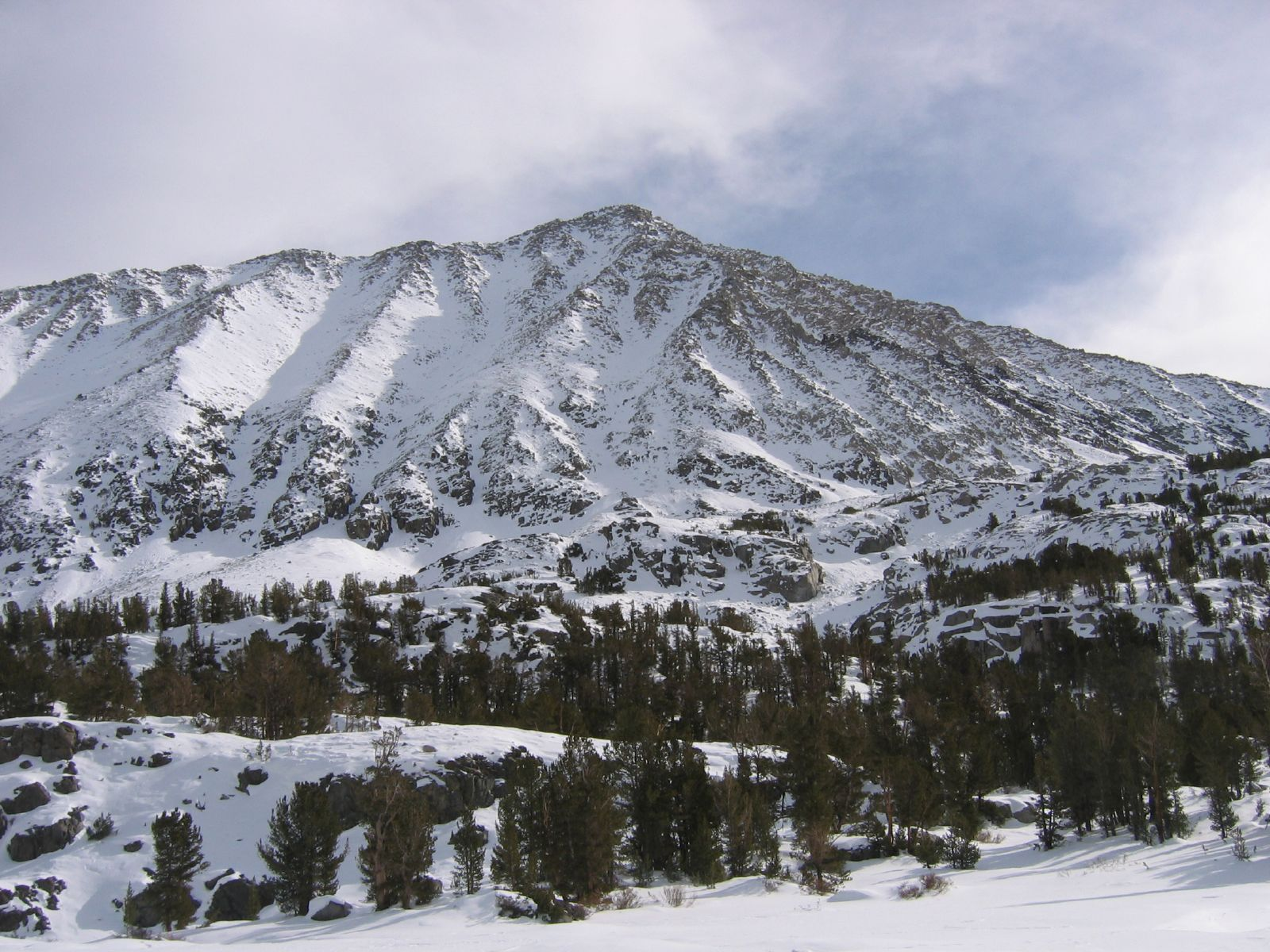
- Morgan seen from Little Lakes Valley

Highest point
- Elevation: 13,754 ft (4,192 m) NAVD 88
- Prominence: 2,628 ft (801 m)
- Parent peak: North Palisade
- Listing: North America highest peaks 80th; US highest major peaks 62nd; California highest major peaks 10th; Sierra Peaks Section; Western States Climbers Emblem peak
- Coordinates: 37°24′19″N 118°43′59″W

Geography
- Location within California Location within the United States
- Location: Inyo County, California, U.S.
- Parent range: Sierra Nevada
- Topo map: USGS Mount Morgan

Climbing
- First ascent: About 1870 by the Wheeler Survey party
- Easiest route: Scramble, class 2

Mount Morgan is a mountain located in northwestern Inyo County, California, in the John Muir Wilderness of the Inyo National Forest.

== Geography ==
Morgan stands within the endorheic watershed of Owens Lake, now a mostly dry lake since its main source of water, the Owens River, was diverted to supply Los Angeles. The west and north sides of Mt. Morgan drain into Rock Creek, thence into the Owens River. The east and south sides of Morgan drain into Morgan Creek, thence into Pine Creek, and into lower Rock Creek.

=== Climate ===
Climate data for Mount Morgan (Inyo County) 37.4082 N, 118.7320 W, Elevation: 13,196 ft (4,022 m) (1991–2020 normals)
Month	Jan	Feb	Mar	Apr	May	Jun	Jul	Aug	Sep	Oct	Nov	Dec	Year
Mean daily maximum °F (°C)	25.1 (−3.8)	23.5 (−4.7)	26.4 (−3.1)	31.4 (−0.3)	39.3 (4.1)	49.8 (9.9)	57.2 (14.0)	56.4 (13.6)	51.0 (10.6)	42.2 (5.7)	31.8 (−0.1)	24.7 (−4.1)	38.2 (3.5)
Daily mean °F (°C)	16.4 (−8.7)	14.3 (−9.8)	16.9 (−8.4)	21.0 (−6.1)	26.8 (−2.9)	36.2 (2.3)	43.0 (6.1)	42.3 (5.7)	39.2 (4.0)	31.7 (−0.2)	22.8 (−5.1)	16.4 (−8.7)	27.2 (−2.6)
Mean daily minimum °F (°C)	7.7 (−13.5)	5.2 (−14.9)	7.4 (−13.7)	10.5 (−11.9)	14.3 (−9.8)	22.6 (−5.2)	28.9 (−1.7)	28.2 (−2.1)	27.3 (−2.6)	21.2 (−6.0)	13.8 (−10.1)	8.0 (−13.3)	16.3 (−8.7)
Average precipitation inches (mm)	8.01 (203)	7.82 (199)	6.10 (155)	3.77 (96)	2.15 (55)	0.57 (14)	0.77 (20)	0.63 (16)	0.54 (14)	1.70 (43)	2.34 (59)	7.28 (185)	41.68 (1,059)
Source: PRISM Climate Group

== Climbing ==
Morgan can be accessed by trail from Rock Creek Canyon, above Tom's Place on 395. Its trailhead is at the far end of the lake. The trail is well marked the first 4 miles (6.4 km) to Francis Lake, where it ends. From there it is a scramble up rocky slopes for 2 miles (3.2 km) to the summit.

== History ==
In 1878 members of the Wheeler Survey, who made the first ascent in about 1870, named the mountain for one of its members, J.H. Morgan of Alabama.

== See also ==
- List of mountain peaks of California
