= Mount Dubois =

Mountain in Mono County, California, United States

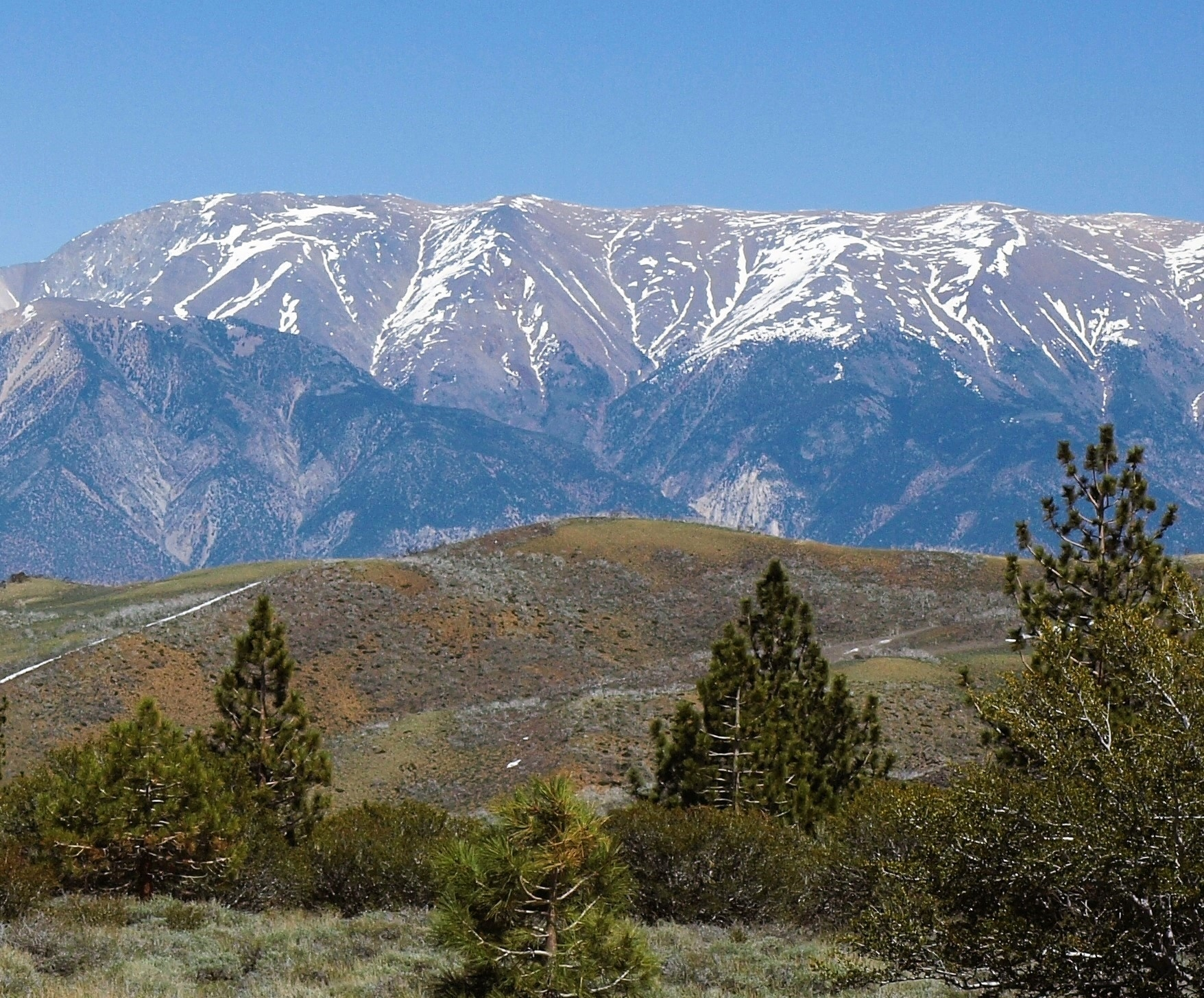
- West aspect, summit to the right

Highest point
- Elevation: 13,565 ft (4,135 m)
- Prominence: 2,319 ft (707 m)
- Listing: California highest major peaks 13th
- Coordinates: 37°47′00″N 118°20′35″W

Geography
- Location within California Location within the United States
- Location: Mono County, California, U.S.
- Parent range: White Mountains
- Topo map: USGS Boundary Peak

Mount Dubois (13,565 feet (4,135 m)) is in the White Mountains in the U.S. state of California. Mount Dubois is in the White Mountains Wilderness of Inyo National Forest.

== Climate ==
Climate data for Mount Dubois 37.7774 N, 118.3341 W, Elevation: 13,268 ft (4,044 m) (1991–2020 normals)
Month	Jan	Feb	Mar	Apr	May	Jun	Jul	Aug	Sep	Oct	Nov	Dec	Year
Mean daily maximum °F (°C)	23.7 (−4.6)	20.8 (−6.2)	25.4 (−3.7)	29.5 (−1.4)	37.7 (3.2)	49.6 (9.8)	57.4 (14.1)	56.4 (13.6)	49.2 (9.6)	40.9 (4.9)	30.4 (−0.9)	24.6 (−4.1)	37.1 (2.9)
Daily mean °F (°C)	16.6 (−8.6)	13.8 (−10.1)	17.5 (−8.1)	18.8 (−7.3)	25.9 (−3.4)	36.1 (2.3)	43.1 (6.2)	42.2 (5.7)	39.6 (4.2)	29.6 (−1.3)	22.9 (−5.1)	16.7 (−8.5)	26.9 (−2.8)
Mean daily minimum °F (°C)	9.4 (−12.6)	6.7 (−14.1)	9.7 (−12.4)	8.1 (−13.3)	14.0 (−10.0)	22.6 (−5.2)	28.8 (−1.8)	28.0 (−2.2)	30.1 (−1.1)	18.3 (−7.6)	15.3 (−9.3)	8.7 (−12.9)	16.6 (−8.5)
Average precipitation inches (mm)	3.08 (78)	3.45 (88)	3.36 (85)	1.85 (47)	2.28 (58)	0.72 (18)	0.95 (24)	1.04 (26)	0.63 (16)	1.70 (43)	0.88 (22)	3.25 (83)	23.19 (588)
Source: PRISM Climate Group
