= Eagle Peak (Modoc County, California) =

Mountain in the state of California

- wataqcúúci (Achumawi)
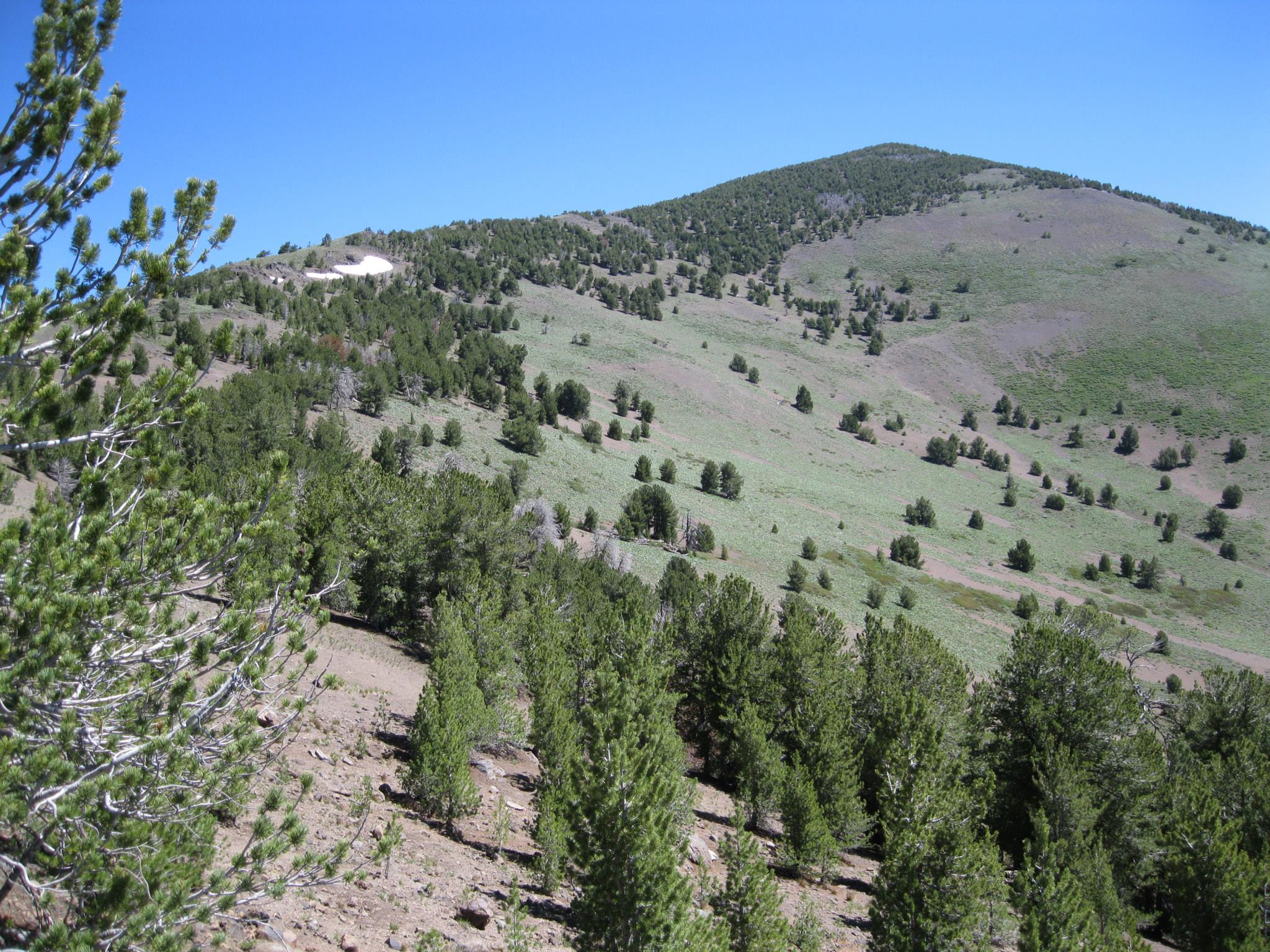

Highest point
- Elevation: 9,897 ft (3,017 m) NAVD 88
- Prominence: 4,352 ft (1,326 m)
- Listing: California county high points 15th; North America isolated peaks 151st
- Coordinates: 41°17′00″N 120°12′03″W

Geography
- Location within California
- Location: Modoc County, California, U.S.
- Parent range: Warner Mountains
- Topo map: USGS Eagle Peak

Eagle Peak is located in the Warner Mountains in Modoc County, California, United States. The area is protected in the South Warner Wilderness on the Modoc National Forest. The summit is the highest point in the Warner Mountains and Modoc County. Much of the precipitation that falls on Eagle Peak is snow due to the high elevation of the mountain.

== Climate ==
Climate data for Eagle Peak 41.2825 N, 120.2001 W, Elevation: 9,498 ft (2,895 m) (1991–2020 normals)
Month	Jan	Feb	Mar	Apr	May	Jun	Jul	Aug	Sep	Oct	Nov	Dec	Year
Mean daily maximum °F (°C)	31.7 (−0.2)	30.7 (−0.7)	33.5 (0.8)	36.9 (2.7)	46.0 (7.8)	55.8 (13.2)	67.2 (19.6)	66.8 (19.3)	59.8 (15.4)	48.4 (9.1)	36.6 (2.6)	30.9 (−0.6)	45.4 (7.4)
Daily mean °F (°C)	24.1 (−4.4)	22.4 (−5.3)	24.4 (−4.2)	27.1 (−2.7)	35.4 (1.9)	44.3 (6.8)	54.3 (12.4)	53.8 (12.1)	47.3 (8.5)	37.7 (3.2)	28.6 (−1.9)	23.5 (−4.7)	35.2 (1.8)
Mean daily minimum °F (°C)	16.6 (−8.6)	14.1 (−9.9)	15.3 (−9.3)	17.3 (−8.2)	24.7 (−4.1)	32.7 (0.4)	41.5 (5.3)	40.9 (4.9)	34.8 (1.6)	26.9 (−2.8)	20.7 (−6.3)	16.1 (−8.8)	25.1 (−3.8)
Average precipitation inches (mm)	5.02 (128)	5.04 (128)	6.78 (172)	6.93 (176)	6.52 (166)	3.31 (84)	0.63 (16)	1.04 (26)	1.33 (34)	3.47 (88)	4.92 (125)	6.67 (169)	51.66 (1,312)
Source: PRISM Climate Group

== See also ==
- Mountain peaks of California
- Mountain peaks of North America
- Mountain peaks of the United States
