= Kern Peak =

Mountain in the U.S. state of California

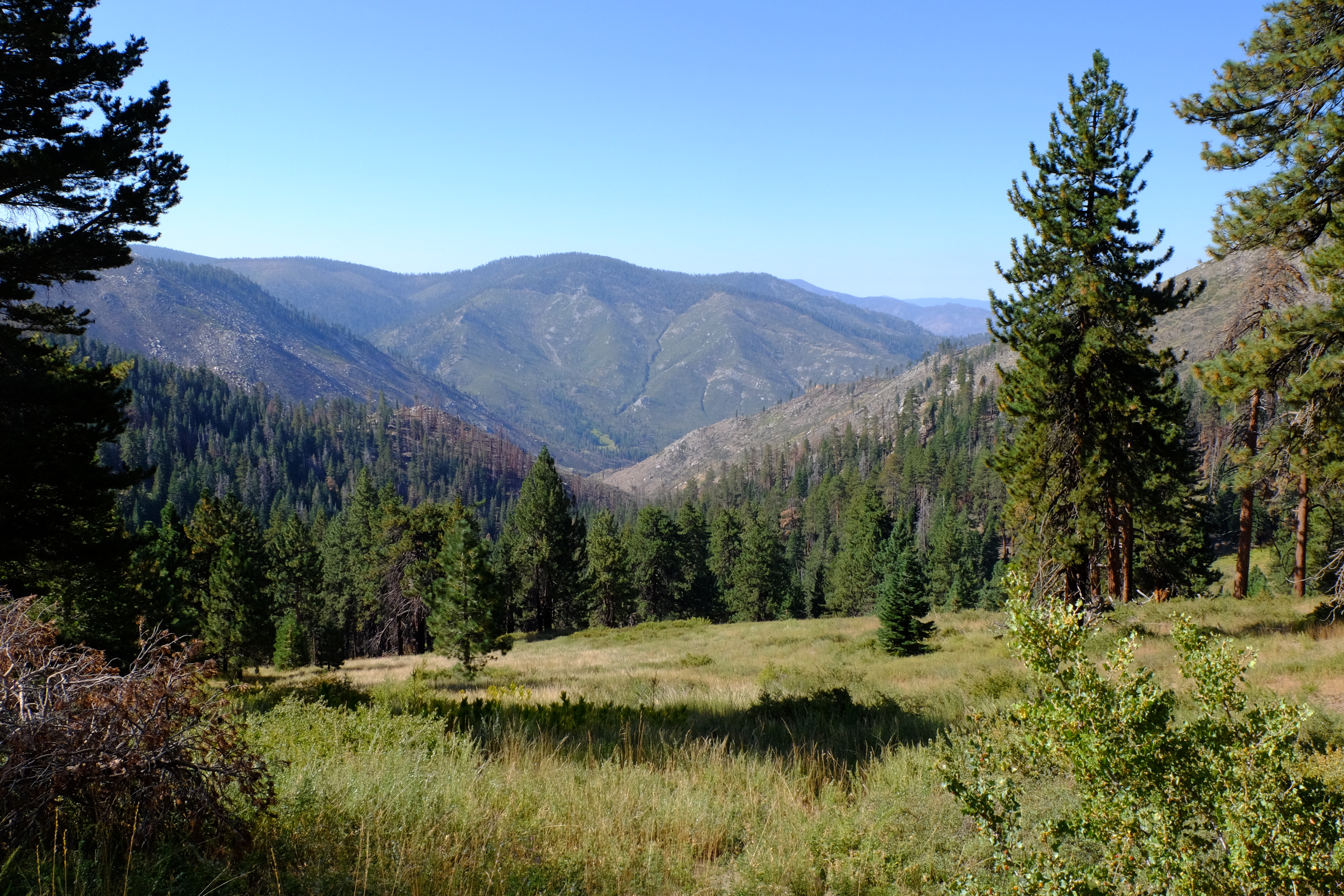
- from the south

Highest point
- Elevation: 11,510 ft (3,510 m)
- Prominence: 2,560 ft (780 m)
- Parent peak: Trail Peak
- Listing: List of mountains of California
- Coordinates: 36°18′28″N 118°17′15″W

Geography
- Location within California
- Location: California, United States
- Parent range: Central South Sierra
- Topo map: USGS Kern Peak

Climbing
- First ascent: 1924 by William Horsfall and C. Laughlin
- Easiest route: Trail Hike

Kern Peak is a mountain peak in Tulare County, California, in the southern Sierra Nevada. At 11,510 ft (3,508 m) in elevation and about 2,560 ft (780 m) of prominence, it is the 49th most prominent peak in California. It is west of Olancha Peak, which is in the same mountain range. The climb to the summit involves a long hike from any trailhead. The best time to climb the mountain is May to October.

== Camping ==
Several campsites are located along the routes to the summit. Some of these campsites are located by the South Fork Kern River. There are also some areas not specifically designated for camping but which are nonetheless able to be camped on. Permits are required to be able to camp in the Golden Trout Wilderness, which can be reserved ahead of time.
