= New York Mountain =

Mountain in Colorado, United States

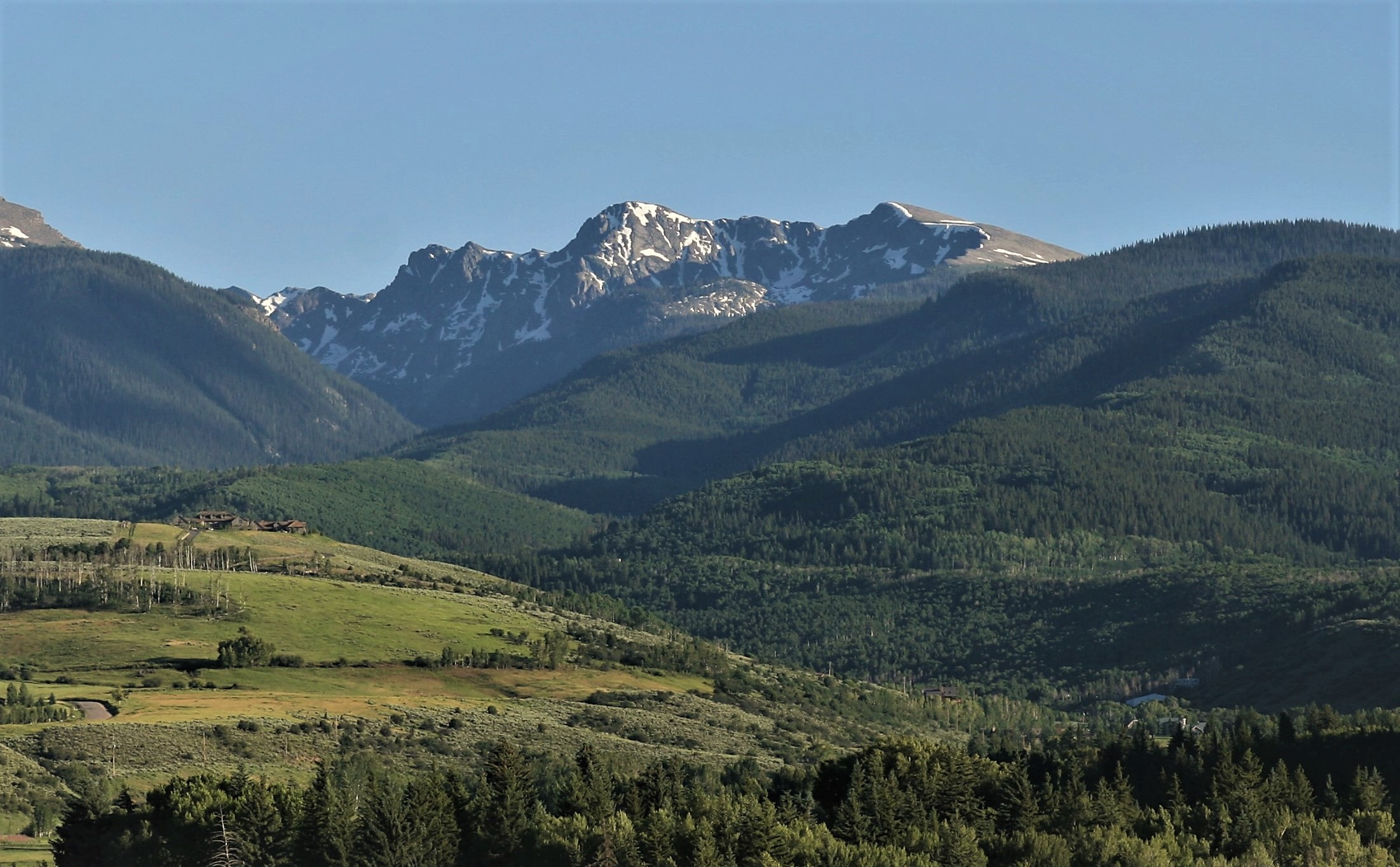
- North aspect, from Interstate 70

Highest point
- Elevation: 12,546 ft (3,824 m)
- Prominence: 350 ft (107 m)
- Isolation: 1.56 mi (2.51 km)
- Coordinates: 39°30′31″N 106°37′05″W

Geography
- Location within Colorado Location within the United States
- Country: United States
- State: Colorado
- County: Eagle
- Protected area: Holy Cross Wilderness
- Parent range: Sawatch Range
- Topo map: USGS Grouse Mountain

Climbing
- Easiest route: class 2

New York Mountain is a mountain in Eagle County, Colorado. Gold Dust Peak lies south of New York Mountain and New York Lake is located southeast. The New York Mountain Trail leads to the summit. The mountain is the site of mining ruins from the late nineteenth century.

== Climate ==
According to the Köppen climate classification system, New York Mountain is located in an alpine subarctic climate zone with cold, snowy winters, and cool to warm summers. Due to its altitude, it receives precipitation all year, as snow in winter and as thunderstorms in summer, with a dry period in late spring.
