= Thompson Peak (Trinity County, California) =

Mountain in California, United States

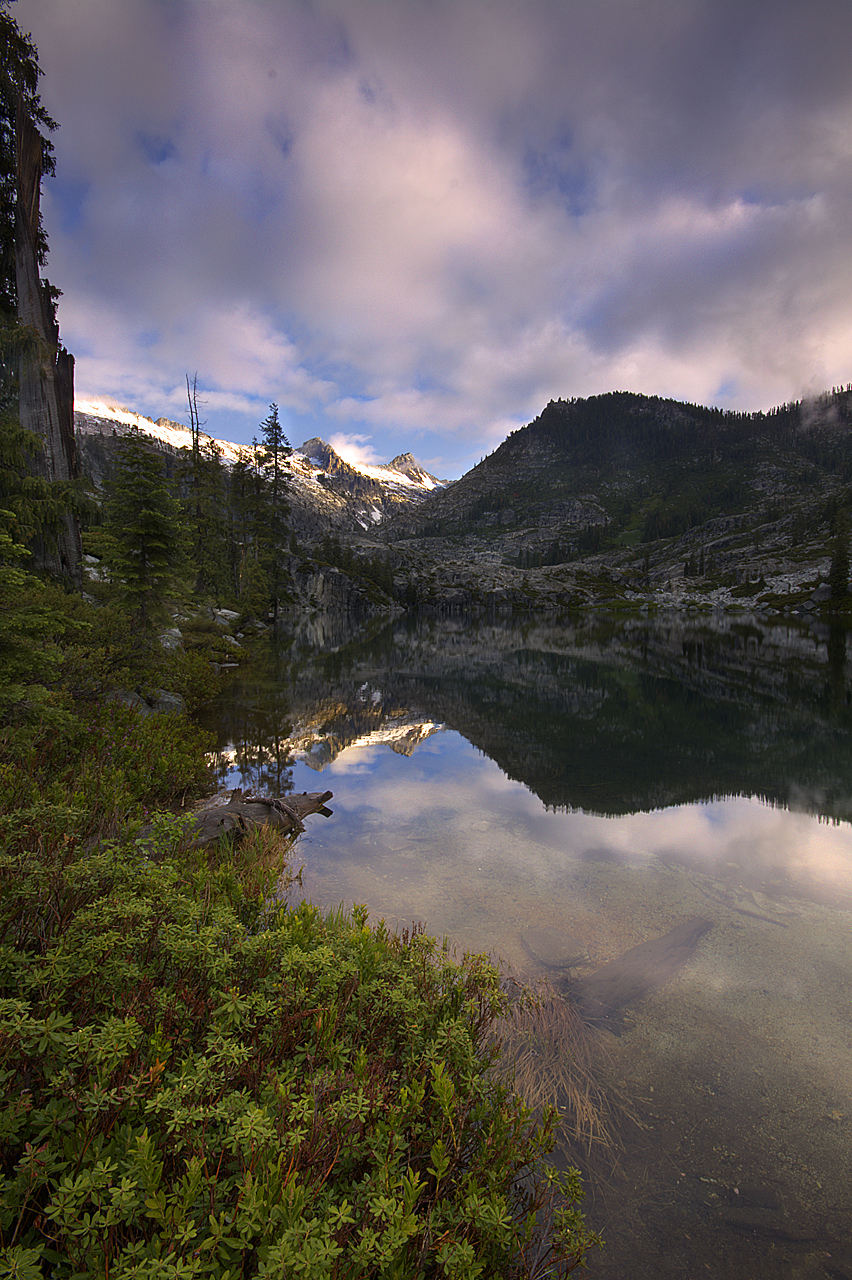
- View of Wedding Cake Peak (left) and Thompson Peak (right), viewed from Canyon Creek Lakes.

Highest point
- Elevation: 9,001 ft (2,744 m) NAVD 88
- Prominence: 3,914 ft (1,193 m)
- Parent peak: Mount Eddy
- Coordinates: 41°00′02″N 123°02′54″W

Geography
- Location: Trinity County, California, U.S.
- Parent range: Klamath Mountains
- Topo map: USGS Thompson Peak

Thompson Peak is a mountain (a high point on a tall granite ridge) in Trinity County, California. At 9,001 feet, it is the highest peak in the Trinity Alps Wilderness, and the second highest in Northern California west of the Cascades.

It is the highest point in a ridge that also features Wedding Cake, another well-known Trinity Alps peak. Thompson Peak is the highest Peak in the Trinity Alps Wilderness, a vast assemblage of craggy granite mountains in northwestern California (Trinity Alps Wilderness is the seventh largest designated wilderness area in California).

(Quote from Per SP member Ed Cooper) "It is incorrect to say that there is no longer glacial activity in the area. The Thompson Glacier lies below the North Face of Thompson Peak. Late in the season, when most of the winter snow has melted, the crevasses and ice of this glacier are exposed. There is another smaller body of snow/ice to the right of the Thompson Glacier, below the north face that might also be considered a small glacier. Further, there is definitely one small glacier on a nearby peak that has crevasses and clearly displays glacier ice."

Thompson Peak has steep north and east faces and a gentle southwest slope. Permanent snow fields fill its wide north cirque and also below its east face. It is usually climbed from Canyon Creek Trail, ascending the class 2-3 South Ridge from the east. This route has an 8000 feet elevation gain. About 10 miles.

== Climate ==
Climate data for Thompson Peak (CA) 41.0021 N, 123.0493 W, Elevation: 8,366 ft (2,550 m) (1991–2020 normals)
Month	Jan	Feb	Mar	Apr	May	Jun	Jul	Aug	Sep	Oct	Nov	Dec	Year
Mean daily maximum °F (°C)	35.7 (2.1)	34.9 (1.6)	36.1 (2.3)	40.5 (4.7)	48.7 (9.3)	57.1 (13.9)	67.2 (19.6)	67.0 (19.4)	61.7 (16.5)	51.4 (10.8)	40.0 (4.4)	34.7 (1.5)	47.9 (8.8)
Daily mean °F (°C)	28.5 (−1.9)	26.8 (−2.9)	27.6 (−2.4)	30.6 (−0.8)	37.9 (3.3)	45.6 (7.6)	54.9 (12.7)	54.4 (12.4)	49.5 (9.7)	41.1 (5.1)	32.5 (0.3)	27.8 (−2.3)	38.1 (3.4)
Mean daily minimum °F (°C)	21.3 (−5.9)	18.8 (−7.3)	19.1 (−7.2)	20.7 (−6.3)	27.1 (−2.7)	34.2 (1.2)	42.6 (5.9)	41.8 (5.4)	37.2 (2.9)	30.8 (−0.7)	25.0 (−3.9)	20.9 (−6.2)	28.3 (−2.1)
Average precipitation inches (mm)	20.10 (511)	21.45 (545)	16.26 (413)	9.72 (247)	4.64 (118)	3.13 (80)	0.74 (19)	0.50 (13)	1.13 (29)	5.62 (143)	9.86 (250)	22.48 (571)	115.63 (2,939)
Source: PRISM Climate Group
