= Keynot Peak =

Mountain in the American state of California

- Location within California Location within the United States

Highest point
- Elevation: 11,105 ft (3,385 m)
- Prominence: 3,095 ft (943 m)
- Coordinates: 36°42′27″N 117°57′44″W

Geography
- Location: Inyo Mountains Wilderness Area; Inyo County, California, U.S.
- Parent range: Inyo Mountains
- Topo map: USGS New York Butte

Keynot Peak is an 11,105-foot (3,385 m) mountain in the Inyo Mountains of Inyo County, California U.S. The summit is the highest point in the Inyo Mountains Wilderness Area which is administered by the Bureau of Land Management. It is located east of the Owens Valley and U.S. Route 395.
