= Peak 9980 =

Mountain in the American state of California

- Location within California Location within the United States

Highest point
- Elevation: 9,980 ft (3,040 m)
- Prominence: 1,700 ft (520 m)
- Coordinates: 35°55′54″N 118°19′53″W

Geography
- Location: Tulare County, California, U.S.
- Parent range: Sierra Nevada

Peak 9980 is a mountain in the Sierra Nevada of Tulare County, California.
