= Waucoba Mountain =

Highest peak in the Inyo Mountains, California

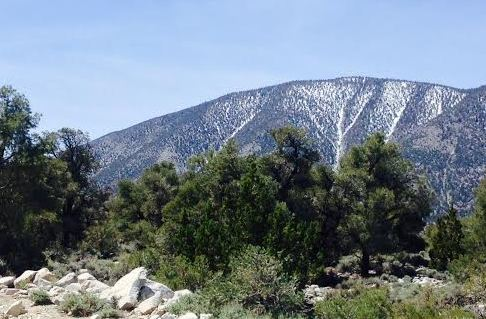
- Waucoba Mountain from the northeast

Highest point
- Elevation: 11,128 ft (3,392 m) NAVD 88
- Prominence: 3,923 ft (1,196 m)
- Listing: Desert Peaks Section List; Great Basin Peaks List
- Coordinates: 37°01′19″N 118°00′28″W

Geography
- Location within California
- Location: Inyo County, California, U.S.
- Parent range: Inyo Mountains
- Topo map: USGS Waucoba Mountain

Waucoba Mountain with an elevation of 11,128 feet (3,392 m) is the highest peak in the Inyo Mountains of eastern California. It is in the Inyo Mountains Wilderness and the Inyo National Forest. It has a clean prominence of 3,923 feet (1,196 m).

"Waucoba" is a name derived from a Native American language meaning "pine trees".

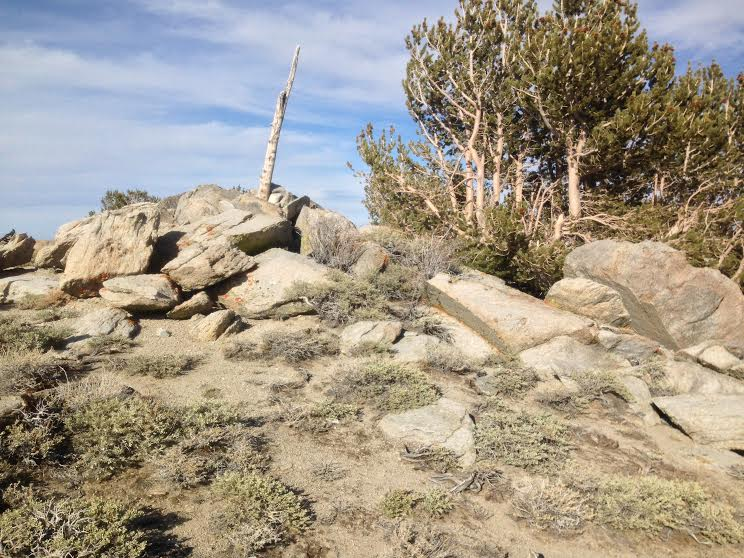
Waucoba Mountain Summit

== Climate ==
Climate data for Waucoba Mountain 37.0179 N, 118.0081 W, Elevation: 10,797 ft (3,291 m) (1991–2020 normals)
| Month | Jan | Feb | Mar | Apr | May | Jun | Jul | Aug | Sep | Oct | Nov | Dec | Year |
|---|---|---|---|---|---|---|---|---|---|---|---|---|---|
| Mean daily maximum °F (°C) | 34.2 (1.2) | 33.1 (0.6) | 36.0 (2.2) | 39.7 (4.3) | 47.7 (8.7) | 58.3 (14.6) | 65.2 (18.4) | 64.5 (18.1) | 58.7 (14.8) | 49.5 (9.7) | 40.6 (4.8) | 34.3 (1.3) | 46.8 (8.2) |
| Daily mean °F (°C) | 24.4 (−4.2) | 22.6 (−5.2) | 25.2 (−3.8) | 28.3 (−2.1) | 35.9 (2.2) | 45.5 (7.5) | 52.2 (11.2) | 51.4 (10.8) | 45.8 (7.7) | 37.7 (3.2) | 30.2 (−1.0) | 24.5 (−4.2) | 35.3 (1.8) |
| Mean daily minimum °F (°C) | 14.5 (−9.7) | 12.1 (−11.1) | 14.4 (−9.8) | 17.0 (−8.3) | 24.1 (−4.4) | 32.8 (0.4) | 39.3 (4.1) | 38.3 (3.5) | 32.9 (0.5) | 26.0 (−3.3) | 19.7 (−6.8) | 14.6 (−9.7) | 23.8 (−4.5) |
| Average precipitation inches (mm) | 1.33 (34) | 1.39 (35) | 2.73 (69) | 1.37 (35) | 1.38 (35) | 0.55 (14) | 0.67 (17) | 0.44 (11) | 0.34 (8.6) | 0.67 (17) | 0.55 (14) | 1.19 (30) | 12.61 (319.6) |
Source: PRISM Climate Group
