= Needham Mountain =

Mountain in California, United States

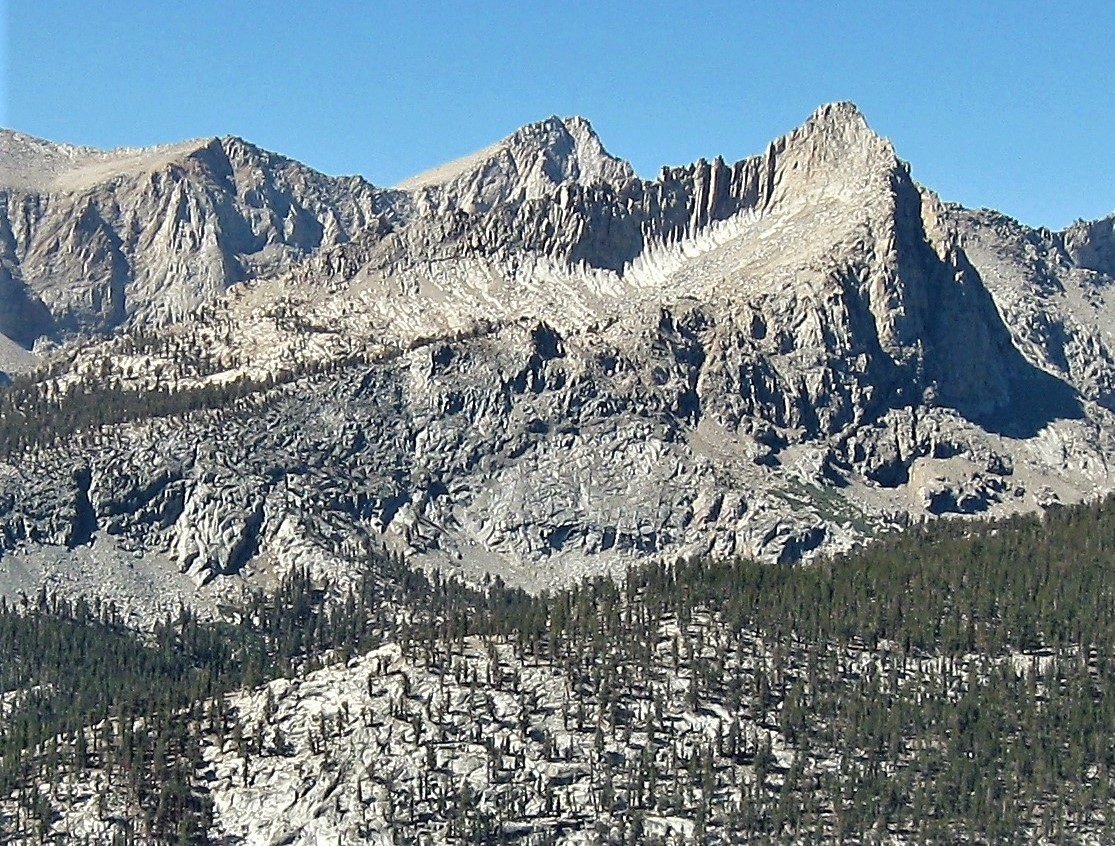
- Northeast aspect centered behind ridge

Highest point
- Elevation: 12,536 ft (3,821 m)
- Prominence: 1,880 ft (570 m)
- Isolation: 6.32 mi (10.17 km)
- Coordinates: 36°27′16″N 118°32′14″W

Geography
- Location within California
- Location: Tulare County, California, US
- Parent range: Sierra Nevada

Climbing
- First ascent: July 1916

Needham Mountain is a mountain summit of the Sierra Nevada, located in Tulare County, California. It is located in the southern Sierra Nevada, in the central part of Sequoia National Park. Needham Mountain is 6 mi (9.7 km) miles east of Mineral King, 5.6 mi (9.0 km) northeast of Mount Kaweah, and 17 mi (27 km) southwest of the highest peak in the state, Mount Whitney. With an altitude of 12,536 ft (3,821 m), Needham Mountain is the twentieth-highest mountain in California with a prominence of 1,880 ft (570 m). The mountain is named after an American congressman who represented California at the turn of the 19th and 20th centuries, James C. Needham. The first ascent of the summit was made in July 1916, by M. R. Parsons, Agnes Vaile, H. B. Graham, and Edmund Chamberlain.

== Climate ==
Needham Mountain is located in an alpine climate zone. Most weather fronts originate in the Pacific Ocean, and travel east toward the Sierra Nevada mountains. As fronts approach, they are forced upward by the peaks, causing them to drop their moisture in the form of rain or snowfall onto the range (orographic lift). Precipitation runoff from the mountain drains east to Big Arroyo, which is a tributary of the Kern River.

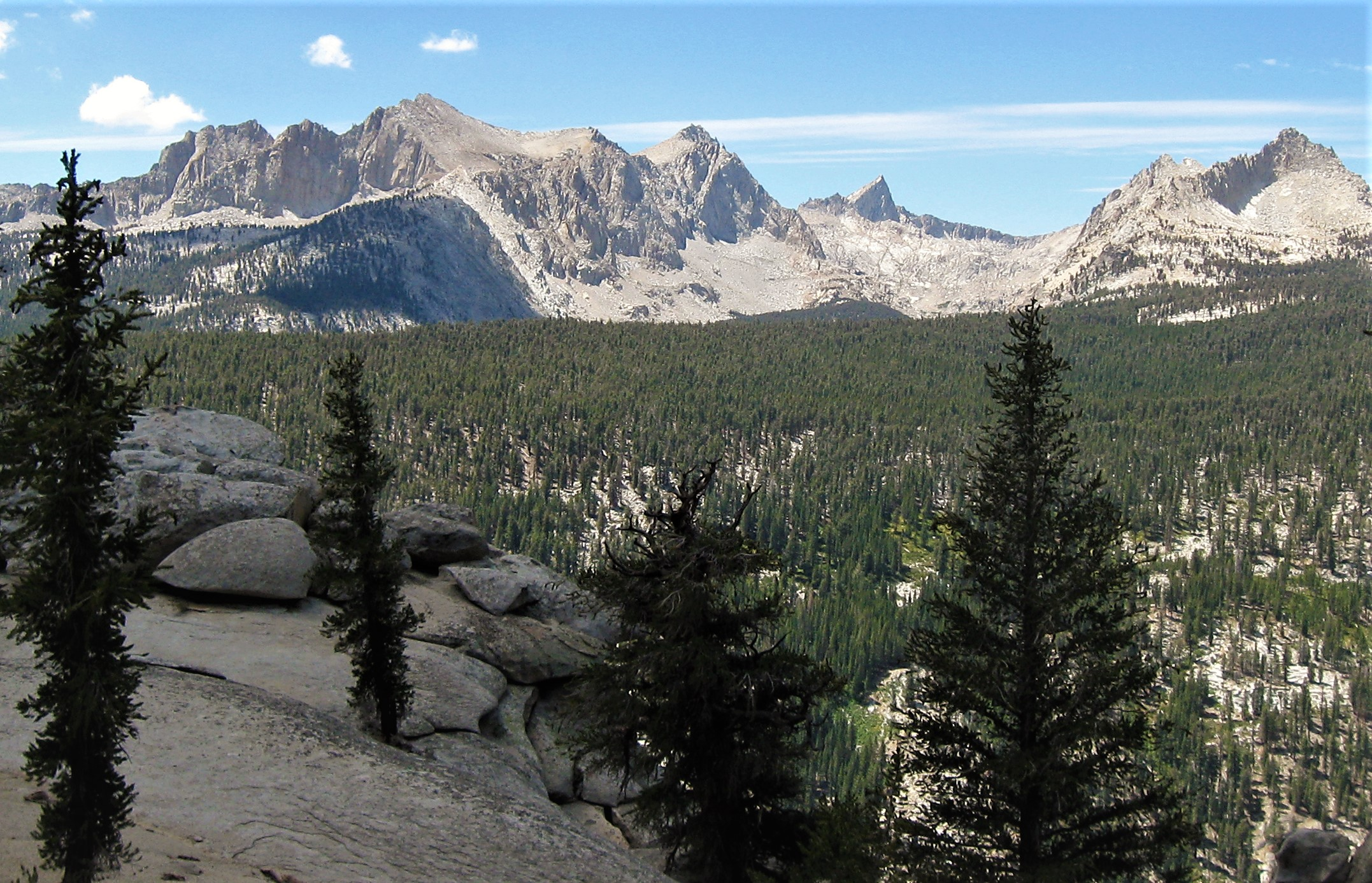
Needham Mountain centered, from ENE

== See also ==
- Great Western Divide
