= Glass Mountain Ridge =

Ridge in Mono County, California

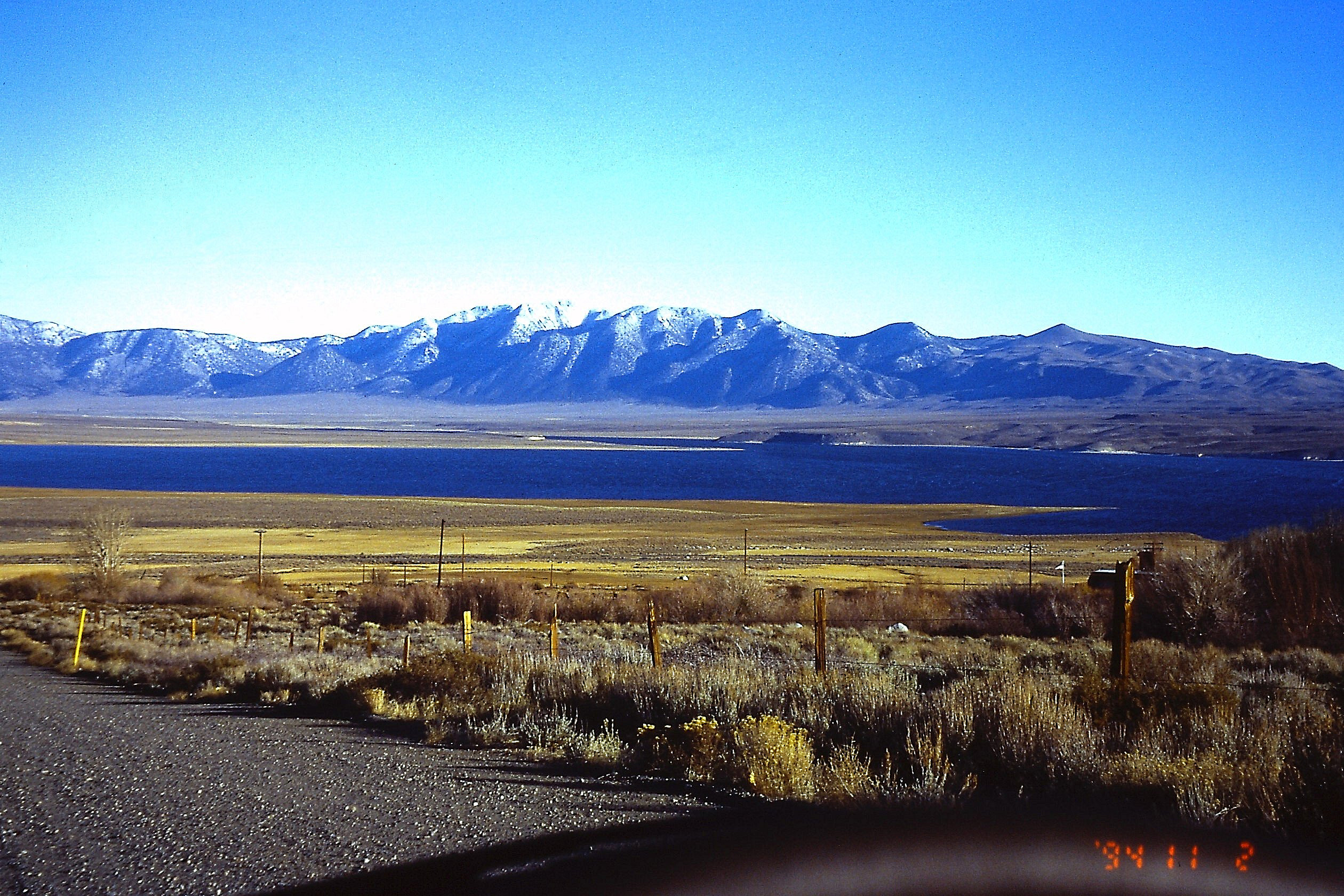
- Crowley Lake and Glass Mountain Ridge in 1994

Highest point
- Elevation: 10,505 ft (3,202 m) NAVD 88
- Coordinates: 37°44′57″N 118°41′07″W

Geography
- Location within California
- Location: Mono County, California, U.S.
- Topo map: USGS

Glass Mountain Ridge is a ridge located in Mono County, California. It reaches an elevation of 10,505 feet (3,202 m).

The Glass Mountain Ridge forms the northeast boundary of Long Valley Caldera. It consists of a sequence of lava domes, flows, and welded pyroclastic flows of rhyolite composition that were erupted between 2.1 and 0.8 million years ago.

== See also ==
- Glass Mountain
