= Devils Peak (Santa Barbara County, California) =

Mountain in California, United States

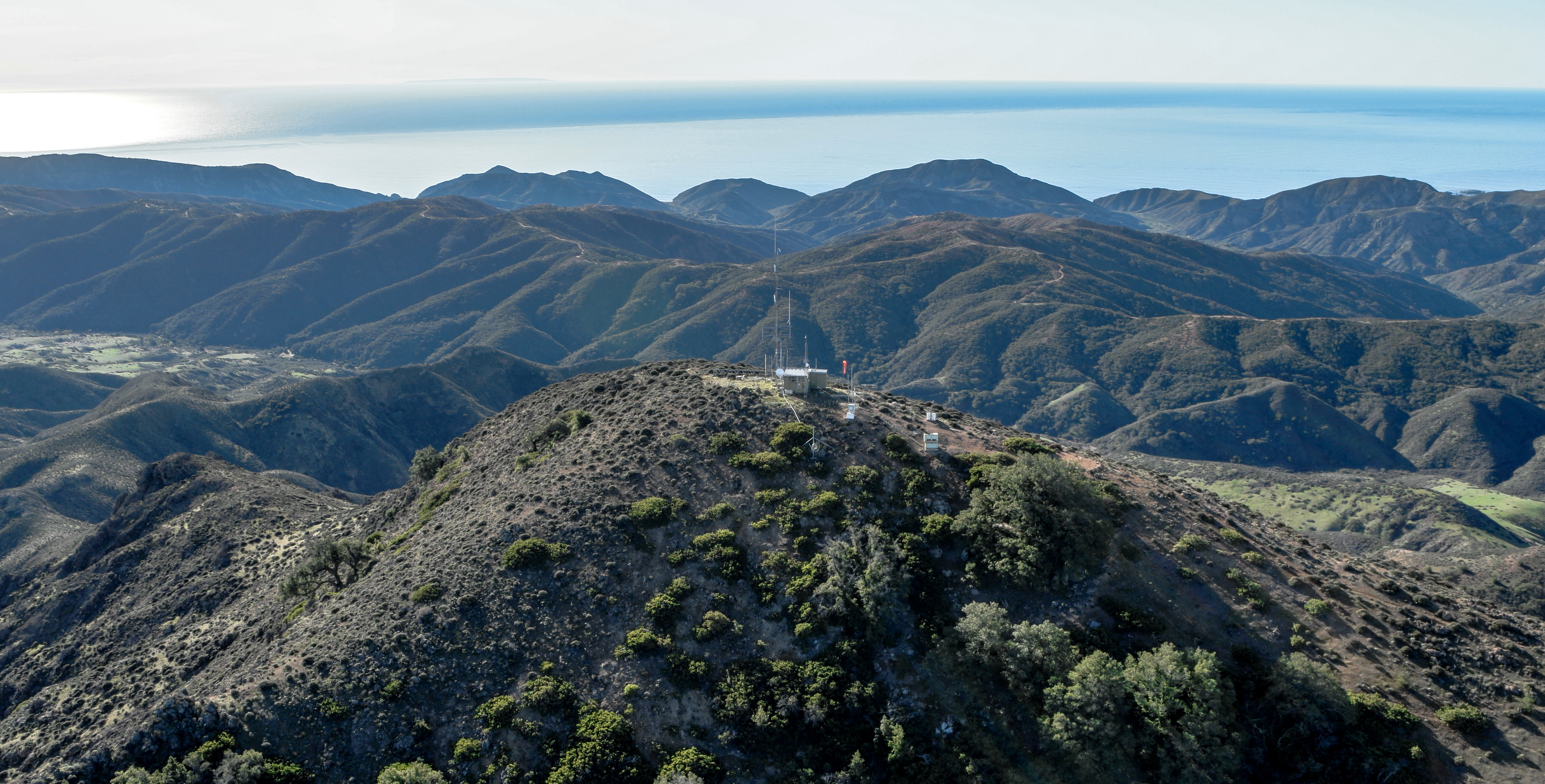
- Devils Peak and its communications facilities. The peak hosts several radio systems including repeaters for amateur radio and public safety.

Highest point
- Elevation: 2,429 ft (740 m) NAVD 88
- Coordinates: 34°01′45″N 119°47′04″W

Geography
- Location within California Location within the United States
- Location: Santa Barbara County, California, U.S.
- Parent range: Channel Islands
- Topo map: Santa Cruz Island B

Devils Peak (or Mount Diablo or Diablo Peak) at 2,429 feet (740 m) is the tallest peak on the Channel Islands of California. It is located on Santa Cruz Island within Channel Islands National Park on land owned by The Nature Conservancy. Visiting the area requires a permit.

Devil's Peak is the highest mountain on an ocean island in the contiguous 48 states, edging out Mount Constitution on Orcas Island by a few feet.
