= Double Mountain (California) =

Mountain in California, United States

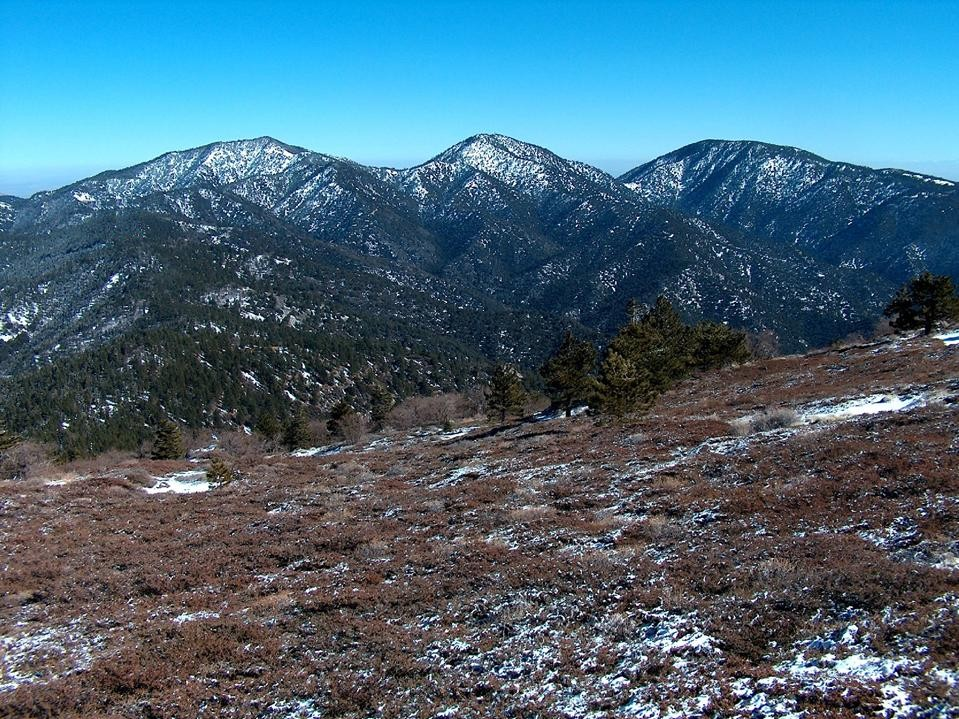
- Tehachapi Mountain, Double Mountain and Covington Mountain

Highest point
- Elevation: 7,993 ft (2,436 m) NAVD 88
- Prominence: 3,821 ft (1,165 m)
- Coordinates: 35°02′00″N 118°29′12″W

Geography
- Location within California Location within the United States
- Location: Kern County, California, U.S.
- Parent range: Tehachapi Mountains
- Topo map: USGS Tehachapi South

Double Mountain is the highest point in the Tehachapi Mountains of California. It has two summits of nearly the same elevation. It is south of the town of Tehachapi, Highway 58 and Tehachapi Pass. Due to its elevation, the mountain receives snowfall during the winter.

== Natural history ==
South of Double Mountain the Tehachapi Range has a large rounded crest, whose eastern flank is quite steep. This crest is the southern terminus of the range of the hybrid Alvord oak, Quercus × alvordiana.
