= Mount Orizaba =

Mountain peak on Santa Catalina Island, California, United States

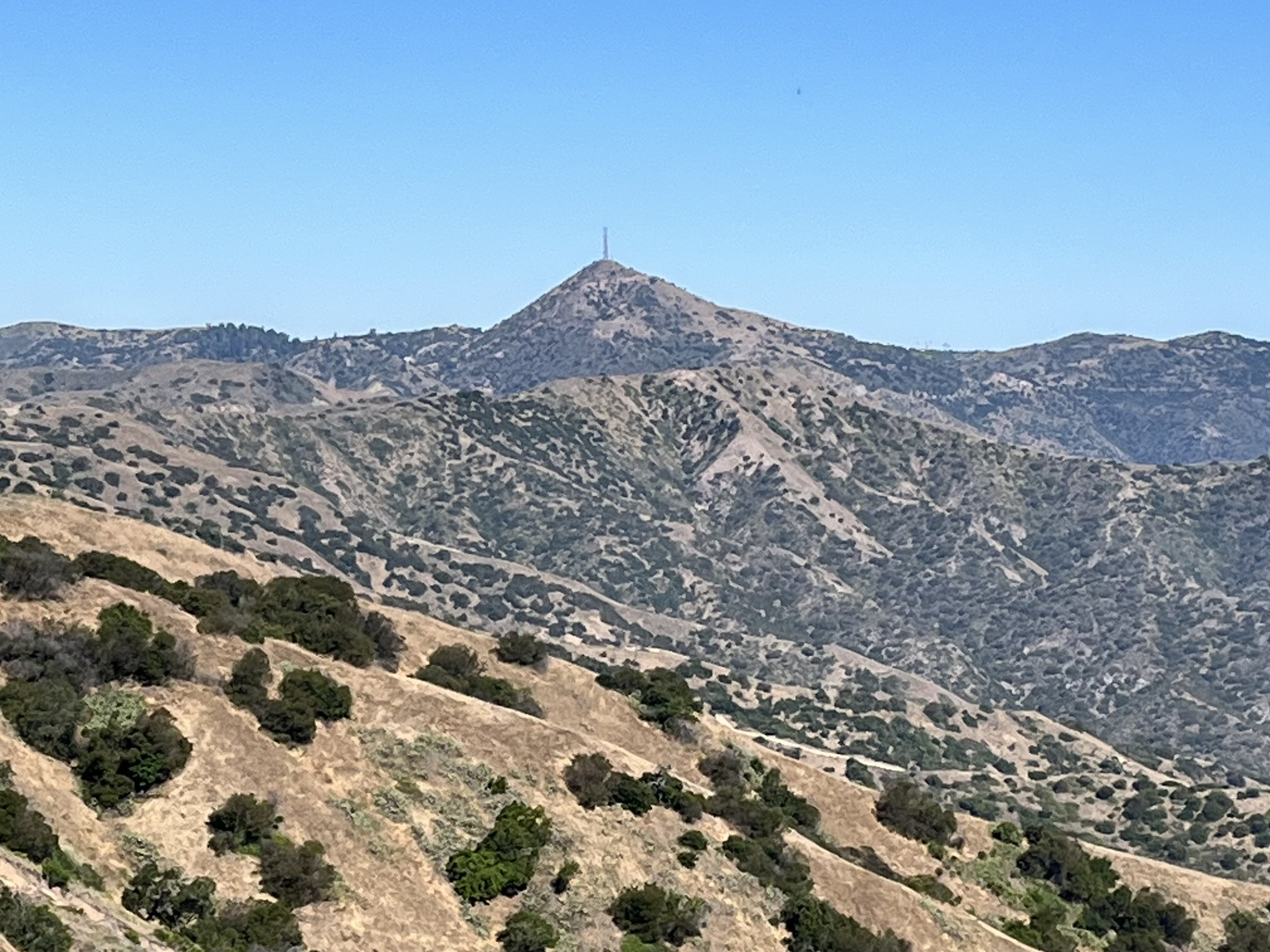

Highest point
- Elevation: 2,127 ft (648 m) NAVD 88
- Prominence: 2,127 ft (648 m)
- Coordinates: 33°22′31″N 118°25′11″W

Geography
- Location within California
- Location: Santa Catalina Island, Los Angeles County, California
- Topo map: USGS Santa Catalina North

Mount Orizaba is the highest peak on Santa Catalina Island, California, United States. The summit is at 2,097 feet (639 m). On January 10, 1949, 8 inches (200 mm) of snow fell on the mountain. There is an FAA VORTAC installation at the summit. It is named after Pico de Orizaba, the tallest peak in Mexico.
