= Maturango Peak =

Mountain in California, United States

- Location within California

Highest point
- Elevation: 8,843 ft (2,695 m) NAVD 88
- Coordinates: 36°07′14″N 117°29′44″W

Geography
- Location: Inyo County, California
- Parent range: Argus Range
- Topo map: USGS Maturango Peak

Maturango Peak is the highest mountain in the Argus Range. It is located in Inyo County, California and reaches an elevation of 8,843 feet (2,695 m). The area is under the control of the Naval Air Weapons Station China Lake and access is restricted.

== Origin of the name ==
The name “Maturango” first appeared in 1877 on the Wheeler Survey Map. It may be derived from the Spanish word “maturrango” (an appellation used in Buenos Aires for a European, meaning a bad horseman or a bad horse), or it may be derived from the name Malarango, a chief of the Coso people.
