= Olancha Peak =

Mountain in the American state of California

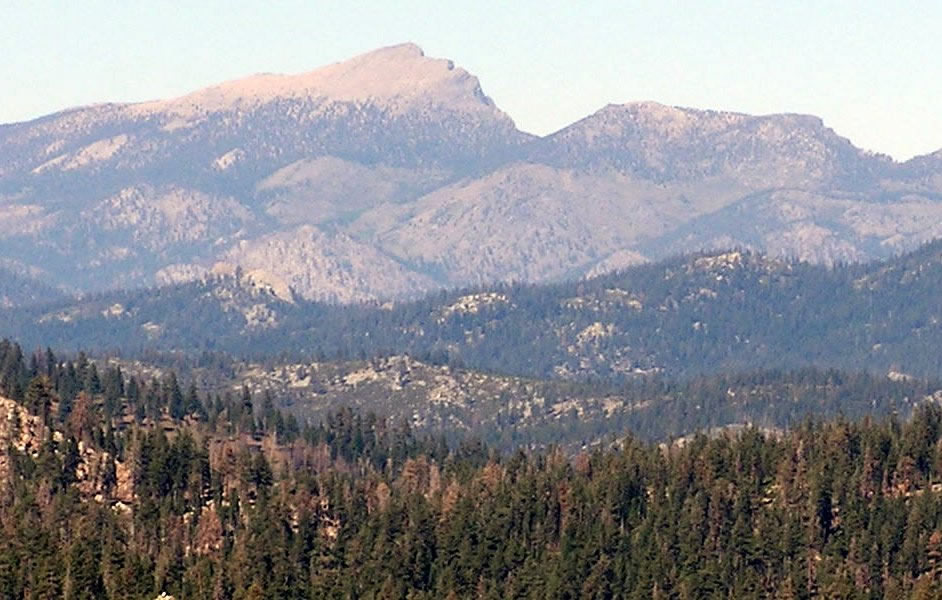
- Olancha Peak seen from Bald Mountain, summer 2007.

Highest point
- Elevation: 12,132 ft (3,698 m) NAVD 88
- Prominence: 3,083 ft (940 m)
- Parent peak: Cirque Peak
- Isolation: 14.71 mi (23.67 km)
- Listing: SPS Emblem peak
- Coordinates: 36°15′55″N 118°07′05″W

Geography
- Location within California Location within the United States
- Location: Tulare / Inyo counties, California, U.S.
- Parent range: Sierra Nevada
- Topo map: USGS Olancha

Climbing
- Easiest route: Scramble, class 2

Olancha Peak is a mountain in the Sierra Nevada of California. It rises to an elevation of 12,132 feet (3,698 m) on the Tulare-Inyo county line in the South Sierra Wilderness. It takes its name from the nearby town of Olancha.

The mountain is also known as "Indianhead" and "the Sleeping Maiden", as some think that parts of the ridgeline of the southern slope of the mountain, when viewed from certain angles, resembles either the face of a man or the figure of a woman lying on her back.

The peak is one of the highest in the Sierra Nevada south of Mount Whitney. It is the southernmost peak that is significantly above treeline on the Sierra Nevada escarpment. Due to the high elevation, most of the precipitation the mountain receives consists of snow.

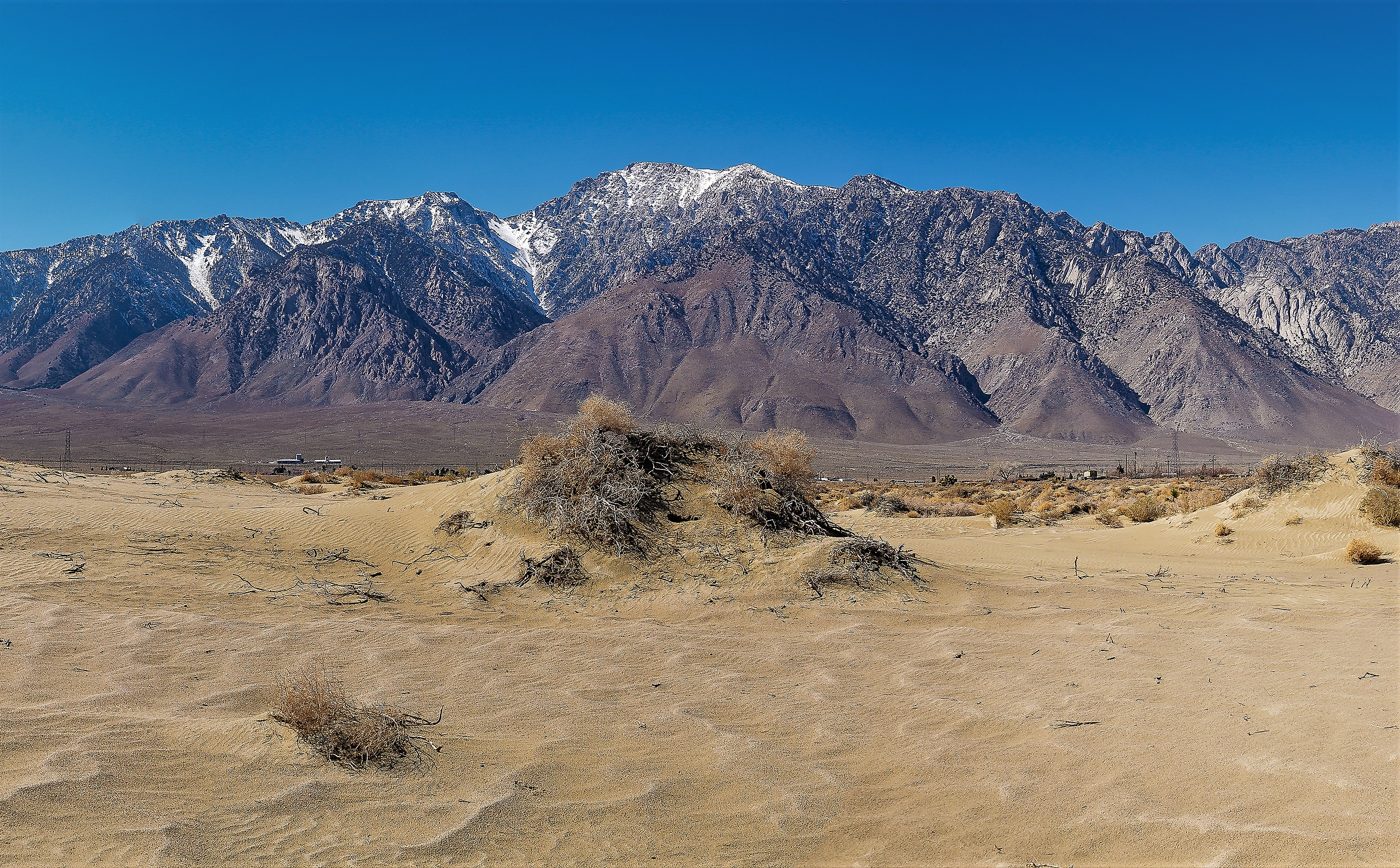
Olancha Peak's east aspect seen from Owens Valley
