= List of mountain peaks of the United States =

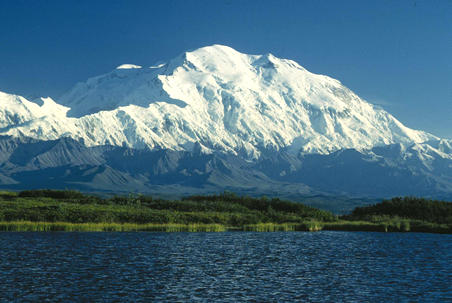
Denali in Alaska is the highest mountain peak of the United States and North America. Federally designated as Mount McKinley, it is the third most topographically prominent and third most topographically isolated summit on Earth after Mount Everest and Aconcagua.

This article comprises three sortable tables of major mountain peaks (Note: This article defines a significant summit as a summit with at least 100 meters (328.1 feet) of topographic prominence, and a major summit as a summit with at least 500 meters (1640 feet) of topographic prominence. All summits in this article have at least 500 meters of topographic prominence. An ultra-prominent summit is a summit with at least 1500 meters (4921 feet) of topographic prominence.) of the United States of America.

The summit of a mountain or hill may be measured in three main ways:

1. The topographic elevation of a summit measures the height of the tip of a mountain above a geodetic sea level. (Note: All elevations in the 48 states of the contiguous United States include an elevation adjustment from the National Geodetic Vertical Datum of 1929 (NGVD 29) to the North American Vertical Datum of 1988 (NAVD 88). For further information, please see this United States National Geodetic Survey note.) (Note: If the elevation or prominence of a summit is calculated as a range of values, the arithmetic mean is shown.) The first table below ranks the 100 highest major summits of the United States by elevation.
2. The topographic prominence of a summit is a measure of how high the summit rises above its surroundings. (Note: The topographic prominence of a summit is the topographic elevation difference between the summit and its highest or key col to a higher summit. The summit may be near its key col or quite far away. The key col for Denali in Alaska is the Isthmus of Rivas in Nicaragua, 7642 kilometers (4749 miles) away.) The second table below ranks the 50 most prominent summits of the United States.
3. The topographic isolation (or radius of dominance) of a summit measures how far the summit lies from its nearest point of equal elevation. (Note: The topographic isolation of a summit is the great-circle distance to its nearest point of equal elevation.) The third table below ranks the 50 most isolated major summits of the United States.

== Highest major summits ==
Of the 100 highest major summits of the United States, only Denali exceeds 6000 meters (19,685 feet) elevation, four peaks exceed 5000 meters (16,404 feet), and all 100 peaks exceed 4012 meters (13,163 feet) elevation.

Of these 100 summits, 53 are located in Colorado, 23 in Alaska, 14 in California, five in Wyoming, two in Hawaiʻi, and one each in Washington, Utah, and New Mexico. Five of these summits are located on the international border between Alaska and Yukon, and one is located on the international border between Alaska and British Columbia. The ten highest major summits of the United States are all located in Alaska.

The 100 highest summits of the United States with at least 500 meters of topographic prominence
Rank	Mountain peak	State	Mountain range	Elevation	Prominence	Isolation	Location
1	Denali (Note: The summit of Denali is the highest point of the Alaska Range, the State of Alaska, the United States of America, and greater North America. Federally designated as Mount McKinley, it is the third most topographically prominent and third most topographically isolated summit on Earth after Mount Everest and Aconcagua.) (Mount McKinley)	Alaska	Alaska Range	20,310 ft 6190.5 m	20,146 ft 6141 m	7,450.24	63.0690°N 151.0063°W
2	Mount Saint Elias (Note: Mount Saint Elias is the second highest major summit of both Canada and the United States.)	Alaska; Yukon	Saint Elias Mountains	18,009 ft 5489 m	11,250 ft 3429 m	25.6 mi 41.3 km	60.2927°N 140.9307°W
3	Mount Foraker (Note: Mount Foraker is the westernmost 5000-meter (16,404-foot) summit of Alaska, the United States, and greater North America.)	Alaska	Alaska Range	17,400 ft 5304 m	7,250 ft 2210 m	14.27 mi 23 km	62.9604°N 151.3998°W
4	Mount Bona (Note: The summit of Mount Bona is the highest point of the northwest Saint Elias Mountains.)	Alaska	Saint Elias Mountains	16,550 ft 5044 m	6,900 ft 2103 m	49.7 mi 80 km	61.3856°N 141.7495°W
5	Mount Blackburn (Note: The summit of Mount Blackburn is the highest point of the Wrangell Mountains.)	Alaska	Wrangell Mountains	16,390 ft 4996 m	11,640 ft 3548 m	60.7 mi 97.6 km	61.7305°N 143.4031°W
6	Mount Sanford	Alaska	Wrangell Mountains	16,237 ft 4949 m	7,687 ft 2343 m	40.3 mi 64.8 km	62.2132°N 144.1292°W
7	Mount Fairweather (Note: Mount Fairweather lies on the international border between Alaska and British Columbia. The peak is the highest point of the Canadian Province of British Columbia and the southernmost and easternmost summit of its elevation in both Canada and the United States.) (Fairweather Mountain)	Alaska; British Columbia	Saint Elias Mountains	15,325 ft 4671 m	12,995 ft 3961 m	124.4 mi 200 km	58.9064°N 137.5265°W
8	Mount Hubbard	Alaska; Yukon	Saint Elias Mountains	14,951 ft 4557 m	8,061 ft 2457 m	21.3 mi 34.4 km	60.3194°N 139.0726°W
9	Mount Bear	Alaska	Saint Elias Mountains	14,831 ft 4520 m	5,054 ft 1540 m	20.1 mi 32.4 km	61.2834°N 141.1433°W
10	Mount Hunter	Alaska	Alaska Range	14,573 ft 4442 m	4,653 ft 1418 m	6.88 mi 11.07 km	62.9504°N 151.0915°W
11	Mount Whitney (Note: The summit of Mount Whitney is the highest point of the Sierra Nevada, the State of California, and the contiguous United States.) (Note: Mount Whitney is the southernmost and easternmost summit of its elevation in United States.)	California	Sierra Nevada	14,505 ft 4421 m	10,080 ft 3072 m	2,649.47	36.5786°N 118.2920°W
12	Mount Alverstone (Boundary Point 180)	Alaska; Yukon	Saint Elias Mountains	14,500 ft 4420 m	1,950 ft 594 m	2.25 mi 3.62 km	60.3518°N 139.0749°W
13	University Peak	Alaska	Saint Elias Mountains	14,470 ft 4410 m	3,210 ft 978 m	3.71 mi 5.97 km	61.3272°N 141.7867°W
14	Mount Elbert (Note: The summit of Mount Elbert is the highest point of the U.S. State of Colorado, the Rocky Mountains of North America, and the entire Mississippi River drainage basin.)	Colorado	Sawatch Range	14,440 ft 4401.2 m	9,093 ft 2772 m	1,079.15	39.1178°N 106.4454°W
15	Mount Massive (Note: Mount Massive is the second highest major summit of the Rocky Mountains.) (Note: The elevation of Mount Massive includes an adjustment of +2.087 m (6.85 ft) from NGVD 29 to NAVD 88.)	Colorado	Sawatch Range	14,428 ft 4398 m	1,961 ft 598 m	5.06 mi 8.14 km	39.1875°N 106.4757°W
16	Mount Harvard (Note: The summit of Mount Harvard is the highest point of the Collegiate Peaks.) (Note: Mount Harvard is the southernmost and easternmost summit of its elevation in the Rocky Mountains.)	Colorado	Sawatch Range	14,421 ft 4395.6 m	2,360 ft 719 m	14.92 mi 24 km	38.9244°N 106.3207°W
17	Mount Rainier (Note: The summit of Mount Rainier is the highest point of the Cascade Range and the U.S. State of Washington. Mount Rainier is the most prominent summit in the contiguous United States and the fourth most prominent in North America.) (Note: The elevation of Mount Rainier includes an adjustment of +1.914 m (6.28 ft) from NGVD 29 to NAVD 88.)	Washington	Cascade Range	14,417 ft 4394 m	13,210 ft 4026 m	731 mi 1,177 km	46.8529°N 121.7604°W
18	Mount Williamson (Note: The elevation of Mount Williamson includes an adjustment of +1.807 m (5.93 ft) from NGVD 29 to NAVD 88.)	California	Sierra Nevada	14,379 ft 4383 m	1,676 ft 511 m	5.41 mi 8.7 km	36.6559°N 118.3111°W
19	Blanca Peak (Note: The summit of Blanca Peak is the highest point of the Sangre de Cristo Mountains and the entire Rio Grande drainage basin.) (Note: Blanca Peak is the southernmost ultra-prominent summit of the Rocky Mountains.) (Note: The elevation of Blanca Peak includes an adjustment of +1.755 m (5.76 ft) from NGVD 29 to NAVD 88.)	Colorado	Sangre de Cristo Mountains	14,351 ft 4374 m	5,326 ft 1623 m	103.4 mi 166.4 km	37.5775°N 105.4856°W
20	La Plata Peak (Note: The elevation of La Plata Peak includes an adjustment of +1.983 m (6.51 ft) from NGVD 29 to NAVD 88.)	Colorado	Sawatch Range	14,343 ft 4372 m	1,836 ft 560 m	6.28 mi 10.11 km	39.0294°N 106.4729°W
21	Uncompahgre Peak (Note: The summit of Uncompahgre Peak is the highest point of the San Juan Mountains and the entire Gulf of California drainage basin.) (Note: Uncompahgre Peak is the westernmost summit of its elevation in the Rocky Mountains.)	Colorado	San Juan Mountains	14,321 ft 4365 m	4,277 ft 1304 m	85 mi 136.8 km	38.0717°N 107.4621°W
22	Crestone Peak (Note: The summit of Crestone Peak is the highest point of the Crestones.) (Note: The elevation of Crestone Peak includes an adjustment of +1.76 m (5.77 ft) from NGVD 29 to NAVD 88.)	Colorado	Sangre de Cristo Range	14,300 ft 4359 m	4,554 ft 1388 m	27.4 mi 44 km	37.9669°N 105.5855°W
23	Mount Lincoln (Note: The summit of Mount Lincoln is the highest point of the Mosquito Range and the entire Missouri River drainage basin.) (Note: Mount Lincoln is the northernmost summit of its elevation in the Rocky Mountains.)	Colorado	Mosquito Range	14,293 ft 4356.5 m	3,862 ft 1177 m	22.5 mi 36.2 km	39.3515°N 106.1116°W
24	Castle Peak (Note: The summit of Castle Peak is the highest point of the Elk Mountains.)	Colorado	Elk Mountains	14,279 ft 4352.2 m	2,365 ft 721 m	20.9 mi 33.6 km	39.0097°N 106.8614°W
25	Grays Peak (Note: The summit of Grays Peak is the highest point of the Front Range and the Continental Divide in North America.) (Note: Grays Peak is the northernmost summit of its elevation in the Rocky Mountains.)	Colorado	Front Range	14,278 ft 4352 m	2,770 ft 844 m	25 mi 40.2 km	39.6339°N 105.8176°W
26	Mount Antero (Note: The summit of Mount Antero is the highest point of the southern Sawatch Range.)	Colorado	Sawatch Range	14,276 ft 4351.4 m	2,503 ft 763 m	17.67 mi 28.4 km	38.6741°N 106.2462°W
27	Mount Evans (Note: The summit elevation of Mount Evans includes a vertical offset of +1.798 m (5.9 ft) from the station benchmark.)	Colorado	Front Range	14,271 ft 4350 m	2,770 ft 844 m	9.79 mi 15.76 km	39.5883°N 105.6438°W
28	Longs Peak (Note: The summit of Longs Peak is the highest point of the northern Front Range.) (Note: Longs Peak is the northernmost 14,000-foot (4267-meter) summit of the Rocky Mountains.)	Colorado	Front Range	14,259 ft 4346 m	2,940 ft 896 m	43.6 mi 70.2 km	40.2550°N 105.6151°W
29	Mount Wilson (Note: The summit of Mount Wilson is the highest point of the San Miguel Mountains.) (Note: Mount Wilson is the westernmost summit of its elevation in the Rocky Mountains.) (Note: The elevation of Mount Wilson includes an adjustment of +1.899 m (6.23 ft) from NGVD 29 to NAVD 88.)	Colorado	San Miguel Mountains	14,252 ft 4344 m	4,024 ft 1227 m	33 mi 53.1 km	37.8391°N 107.9916°W
30	White Mountain Peak (Note: The summit of White Mountain Peak is the highest point of the White Mountains.)	California	White Mountains	14,252 ft 4344 m	7,196 ft 2193 m	67.4 mi 108.6 km	37.6341°N 118.2557°W
31	North Palisade (Note: The summit of North Palisade is the highest point of the Palisades.) (Note: The elevation of North Palisade includes an adjustment of +1.867 m (6.13 ft) from NGVD 29 to NAVD 88.)	California	Sierra Nevada	14,248 ft 4343 m	2,894 ft 882 m	32.2 mi 51.8 km	37.0943°N 118.5145°W
32	Mount Princeton	Colorado	Sawatch Range	14,204 ft 4329.3 m	2,177 ft 664 m	5.19 mi 8.36 km	38.7492°N 106.2424°W
33	Mount Yale	Colorado	Sawatch Range	14,200 ft 4328.2 m	1,896 ft 578 m	5.55 mi 8.93 km	38.8442°N 106.3138°W
34	Mount Shasta (Note: The summit of Mount Shasta is the highest point of the southern Cascade Range.)	California	Cascade Range	14,179 ft 4321.8 m	9,772 ft 2979 m	335 mi 539 km	41.4092°N 122.1949°W
35	Maroon Peak	Colorado	Elk Mountains	14,163 ft 4317 m	2,336 ft 712 m	8.06 mi 12.97 km	39.0708°N 106.9890°W
36	Mount Wrangell	Alaska	Wrangell Mountains	14,163 ft 4317 m	5,613 ft 1711 m	14.79 mi 23.8 km	62.0059°N 144.0187°W
37	Mount Sneffels (Note: The summit of Mount Sneffels is the highest point of the Sneffels Range.)	Colorado	Sneffels Range	14,158 ft 4315.4 m	3,050 ft 930 m	15.71 mi 25.3 km	38.0038°N 107.7923°W
38	Capitol Peak (Note: The elevation of Capitol Peak includes an adjustment of +1.991 m (6.53 ft) from NGVD 29 to NAVD 88.)	Colorado	Elk Mountains	14,137 ft 4309 m	1,750 ft 533 m	7.44 mi 11.98 km	39.1503°N 107.0829°W
39	Pikes Peak (Note: Pikes Peak is the easternmost 14,000-foot (4267-meter) summit and ultra-prominent summit of the Rocky Mountains. Pikes Peak was the inspiration for the lyrics of America the Beautiful.)	Colorado	Front Range	14,115 ft 4302.31 m	5,530 ft 1686 m	60.6 mi 97.6 km	38.8405°N 105.0442°W
40	Windom Peak (Note: The summit of Windom Peak is the highest point of the Needle Mountains.) (Note: Mount Eolus may be higher than Windom Peak.) (Note: The elevation of Windom Peak includes an adjustment of +1.785 m (5.86 ft) from NGVD 29 to NAVD 88.)	Colorado	Needle Mountains	14,093 ft 4296 m	2,187 ft 667 m	26.3 mi 42.4 km	37.6212°N 107.5919°W
41	Mount Augusta	Alaska; Yukon	Saint Elias Mountains	14,070 ft 4289 m	5,082 ft 1549 m	14.41 mi 23.2 km	60.3074°N 140.4584°W
42	Handies Peak	Colorado	San Juan Mountains	14,058 ft 4284.8 m	1,908 ft 582 m	11.18 mi 18 km	37.9130°N 107.5044°W
43	Culebra Peak (Note: The summit of Culebra Peak is the highest point of the Culebra Range.) (Note: Culebra Peak is the southernmost 14,000-foot (4267-meter) summit of the Rocky Mountains.) (Note: The elevation of Culebra Peak includes an adjustment of +1.74 m (5.71 ft) from NGVD 29 to NAVD 88.)	Colorado	Culebra Range	14,053 ft 4283 m	4,827 ft 1471 m	35.4 mi 56.9 km	37.1224°N 105.1858°W
44	San Luis Peak (Note: The summit of San Luis Peak is the highest point of the La Garita Mountains.)	Colorado	La Garita Mountains	14,022 ft 4273.8 m	3,113 ft 949 m	26.9 mi 43.4 km	37.9868°N 106.9313°W
45	Mount of the Holy Cross (Note: The summit of Mount of the Holy Cross is the highest point of the northern Sawatch Range.) (Note: The summit elevation of Mount of the Holy Cross includes a vertical offset of +0.61 m (2 ft) from the station benchmark.)	Colorado	Sawatch Range	14,011 ft 4270.5 m	2,113 ft 644 m	18.41 mi 29.6 km	39.4668°N 106.4817°W
46	Grizzly Peak	Colorado	Sawatch Range	13,995 ft 4265.6 m	1,928 ft 588 m	6.77 mi 10.89 km	39.0425°N 106.5976°W
47	Mount Humphreys (Note: The elevation of Mount Humphreys includes an adjustment of +1.842 m (6.04 ft) from NGVD 29 to NAVD 88.)	California	Sierra Nevada	13,992 ft 4265 m	2,563 ft 781 m	14.71 mi 23.7 km	37.2705°N 118.6730°W
48	Mount Keith (Note: The elevation of Mount Keith includes an adjustment of +1.795 m (5.89 ft) from NGVD 29 to NAVD 88.)	California	Sierra Nevada	13,982 ft 4262 m	1,936 ft 590 m	3.09 mi 4.97 km	36.7001°N 118.3436°W
49	Mount Ouray (Note: The summit of Mount Ouray is the highest point of the far southern Sawatch Range.)	Colorado	Sawatch Range	13,961 ft 4255.4 m	2,659 ft 810 m	13.58 mi 21.9 km	38.4227°N 106.2247°W
50	Vermilion Peak (Note: The elevation of Vermilion Peak includes an adjustment of +1.827 m (5.99 ft) from NGVD 29 to NAVD 88.)	Colorado	San Juan Mountains	13,900 ft 4237 m	2,105 ft 642 m	9.07 mi 14.6 km	37.7993°N 107.8285°W
51	Atna Peaks	Alaska	Wrangell Mountains	13,860 ft 4225 m	2,210 ft 674 m	3.64 mi 5.86 km	61.7495°N 143.2414°W
52	Regal Mountain	Alaska	Wrangell Mountains	13,845 ft 4220 m	4,395 ft 1340 m	12.25 mi 19.72 km	61.7438°N 142.8675°W
53	Mount Darwin (Note: The elevation of Mount Darwin includes an adjustment of +1.886 m (6.19 ft) from NGVD 29 to NAVD 88.)	California	Sierra Nevada	13,837 ft 4218 m	1,891 ft 576 m	7.13 mi 11.48 km	37.1669°N 118.6721°W
54	Mount Hayes (Note: The summit of Mount Hayes is the highest point of the Hayes Range.) (Note: Mount Hayes is the northernmost 4000-meter (13,123-foot) summit of Alaska, the United States, and greater North America.)	Alaska	Alaska Range	13,832 ft 4216 m	11,507 ft 3507 m	125.5 mi 202 km	63.6203°N 146.7178°W
55	Mount Silverheels	Colorado	Front Range	13,829 ft 4215 m	2,283 ft 696 m	5.48 mi 8.82 km	39.3394°N 106.0054°W
56	Rio Grande Pyramid	Colorado	San Juan Mountains	13,827 ft 4214.4 m	1,881 ft 573 m	10.76 mi 17.31 km	37.6797°N 107.3924°W
57	Gannett Peak (Note: The summit of Gannett Peak is the highest point of the Wind River Range, the U.S. State of Wyoming, and the central Rocky Mountains.) (Note: Gannett Peak is the northernmost and westernmost summit of its elevation in the Rocky Mountains.)	Wyoming	Wind River Range	13,809 ft 4209.1 m	7,076 ft 2157 m	290 mi 467 km	43.1842°N 109.6542°W
58	Mount Kaweah (Note: The summit of Mount Kaweah is the highest point of the Great Western Divide.) (Note: Mount Kaweah is the southernmost summit of its elevation in United States.) (Note: The elevation of Mount Kaweah includes an adjustment of +1.652 m (5.42 ft) from NGVD 29 to NAVD 88.)	California	Sierra Nevada	13,807 ft 4209 m	2,027 ft 618 m	10.73 mi 17.27 km	36.5261°N 118.4785°W
59	Mauna Kea (Note: The summit of Mauna Kea is the highest point of the Island of Hawaiʻi, the U.S. State of Hawaiʻi, and all islands of the Pacific Ocean.) (Note: Mauna Kea is the tallest mountain on Earth as measured from base to summit. The shield volcano sits on the ocean floor at a depth of 5998 meters (19,678 feet) for a total height of 10,205.3 meters (33,482 feet).)	Hawaiʻi	Island of Hawaiʻi	13,803 ft 4207.3 m	13,803 ft 4207 m	3,947.00	19.8207°N 155.4681°W
60	Grand Teton (Note: The summit of Grand Teton is the highest point of the Teton Range.) (Note: Grand Teton is the northernmost and westernmost 4000-meter (13,123-foot) summit of the Rocky Mountains.)	Wyoming	Teton Range	13,775 ft 4198.7 m	6,545 ft 1995 m	69.4 mi 111.6 km	43.7412°N 110.8024°W
61	Mount Cook	Alaska; Yukon	Saint Elias Mountains	13,760 ft 4194 m	7,710 ft 2350 m	14.54 mi 23.4 km	60.1816°N 139.9811°W
62	Mount Morgan	California	Sierra Nevada	13,758 ft 4193.4 m	2,648 ft 807 m	9.86 mi 15.87 km	37.4053°N 118.7329°W
63	Fremont Peak (Note: The summit of Fremont Peak is the highest point of the Wind River Range, the U.S. State of Wyoming, and the central Rocky Mountains.) (Note: Fremont Peak is the northernmost summit of its elevation in the Rocky Mountains.)	Wyoming	Wind River Range	13,750 ft 4191 m			43.1247°N 109.6179°W
64	Mount Gabb (Note: The elevation of Mount Gabb includes an adjustment of +1.958 m (6.42 ft) from NGVD 29 to NAVD 88.)	California	Sierra Nevada	13,747 ft 4190 m	2,601 ft 793 m	4.28 mi 6.89 km	37.3769°N 118.8025°W
65	Bald Mountain (Note: The elevation of Bald Mountain includes an adjustment of +1.922 m (6.31 ft) from NGVD 29 to NAVD 88.)	Colorado	Front Range	13,690 ft 4173 m	2,099 ft 640 m	7.51 mi 12.09 km	39.4448°N 105.9705°W
66	Mount Oso (Note: The elevation of Mount Oso includes an adjustment of +1.776 m (5.83 ft) from NGVD 29 to NAVD 88.)	Colorado	San Juan Mountains	13,690 ft 4173 m	1,664 ft 507 m	5.41 mi 8.71 km	37.6070°N 107.4936°W
67	Mauna Loa (Note: Mauna Loa is the southernmost and westernmost 4000-meter (13,123-foot) summit of Hawaiʻi and the United States.) (Note: The shield volcano Mauna Loa is the most voluminous mountain on Earth with an estimated volume of 74,000 km^{3} (18,000 cu mi), or enough material to fill the Grand Canyon more than 18 times.)	Hawaiʻi	Island of Hawaiʻi	13,679 ft 4169 m	7,099 ft 2164 m	25.4 mi 40.8 km	19.4756°N 155.6054°W
68	Mount Jackson	Colorado	Sawatch Range	13,676 ft 4168.5 m	1,810 ft 552 m	3.21 mi 5.16 km	39.4853°N 106.5367°W
69	Mount Tom (Note: The elevation of Mount Tom includes an adjustment of +1.379 m (4.52 ft) from NGVD 29 to NAVD 88.)	California	Sierra Nevada	13,657 ft 4163 m	1,992 ft 607 m	4.77 mi 7.67 km	37.3762°N 119.1789°W
70	Bard Peak (Note: The elevation of Bard Peak includes an adjustment of +1.707 m (5.6 ft) from NGVD 29 to NAVD 88.)	Colorado	Front Range	13,647 ft 4159 m	1,701 ft 518 m	5.43 mi 8.74 km	39.7204°N 105.8044°W
71	West Spanish Peak (Note: West Spanish Peak is the easternmost 4000-meter (13,123-foot) summit of the Rocky Mountains and the United States.) (Note: The elevation of West Spanish Peak includes an adjustment of +1.468 m (4.82 ft) from NGVD 29 to NAVD 88.)	Colorado	Spanish Peaks	13,631 ft 4155 m	3,686 ft 1123 m	19.87 mi 32 km	37.3756°N 104.9934°W
72	Mount Powell (Note: The summit of Mount Powell is the highest point of the Gore Range.) (Note: The elevation of Mount Powell includes an adjustment of +1.771 m (5.81 ft) from NGVD 29 to NAVD 88.)	Colorado	Gore Range	13,586 ft 4141 m	3,000 ft 914 m	21.5 mi 34.6 km	39.7601°N 106.3407°W
73	Hagues Peak (Note: The summit of Hagues Peak is the highest point of the Mummy Range.)	Colorado	Mummy Range	13,573 ft 4137 m	2,420 ft 738 m	15.7 mi 25.3 km	40.4845°N 105.6464°W
74	Mount Dubois (Note: The elevation of Mount Dubois includes an adjustment of +1.879 m (6.16 ft) from NGVD 29 to NAVD 88.)	California	White Mountains	13,565 ft 4135 m	2,339 ft 713 m	9.63 mi 15.5 km	37.7834°N 118.3432°W
75	Tower Mountain (Note: The elevation of Tower Mountain includes an adjustment of +1.796 m (5.89 ft) from NGVD 29 to NAVD 88.)	Colorado	San Juan Mountains	13,558 ft 4132 m	1,652 ft 504 m	4.88 mi 7.86 km	37.8573°N 107.6230°W
76	Treasure Mountain (Note: The elevation of Treasure Mountain includes an adjustment of +2.008 m (6.59 ft) from NGVD 29 to NAVD 88.)	Colorado	Elk Mountains	13,535 ft 4125 m	2,828 ft 862 m	6.92 mi 11.13 km	39.0244°N 107.1228°W
77	Kings Peak (Note: The summit of Kings Peak is the highest point of the Uinta Mountains, the U.S. State of Utah, and the western Rocky Mountains.) (Note: The elevation of Kings Peak includes an adjustment of +1.807 m (5.93 ft) from NGVD 29 to NAVD 88.)	Utah	Uinta Mountains	13,534 ft 4125 m	6,358 ft 1938 m	166.6 mi 268 km	40.7763°N 110.3729°W
78	North Arapaho Peak (Note: The summit of North Arapaho Peak is the highest point of the Indian Peaks.) (Note: The elevation of North Arapaho Peak includes an adjustment of +1.763 m (5.78 ft) from NGVD 29 to NAVD 88.)	Colorado	Front Range	13,508 ft 4117 m	1,665 ft 507 m	15.38 mi 24.8 km	40.0265°N 105.6504°W
79	Mount Pinchot (Note: The elevation of Mount Pinchot includes an adjustment of +1.81 m (5.94 ft) from NGVD 29 to NAVD 88.)	California	Sierra Nevada	13,500 ft 4115 m	2,110 ft 643 m	4.71 mi 7.58 km	36.9473°N 118.4054°W
80	Mount Natazhat	Alaska	Saint Elias Mountains	13,435 ft 4095 m	5,985 ft 1824 m	15.49 mi 24.9 km	61.5217°N 141.1030°W
81	Mount Jarvis	Alaska	Wrangell Mountains	13,421 ft 4091 m	4,771 ft 1454 m	11.15 mi 17.95 km	62.0234°N 143.6198°W
82	Parry Peak (Note: The elevation of Parry Peak includes an adjustment of +1.763 m (5.78 ft) from NGVD 29 to NAVD 88.)	Colorado	Front Range	13,397 ft 4083 m	1,720 ft 524 m	9.46 mi 15.22 km	39.8381°N 105.7132°W
83	Bill Williams Peak (Note: The summit of Bill Williams Peak is the highest point of the Williams Mountains.) (Note: The elevation of Bill Williams Peak includes an adjustment of +2.044 m (6.71 ft) from NGVD 29 to NAVD 88.)	Colorado	Williams Mountains	13,389 ft 4081 m	1,682 ft 513 m	3.72 mi 5.98 km	39.1806°N 106.6102°W
84	Sultan Mountain (Note: The elevation of Sultan Mountain includes an adjustment of +1.649 m (5.41 ft) from NGVD 29 to NAVD 88.)	Colorado	San Juan Mountains	13,373 ft 4076 m	1,868 ft 569 m	4.59 mi 7.39 km	37.7859°N 107.7038°W
85	Mount Herard (Note: The elevation of Mount Herard includes an adjustment of +1.64 m (5.38 ft) from NGVD 29 to NAVD 88.)	Colorado	Sangre de Cristo Mountains	13,345 ft 4068 m	2,040 ft 622 m	4.63 mi 7.45 km	37.8492°N 105.4949°W
86	West Buffalo Peak (Note: The elevation of West Buffalo Peak includes an adjustment of +1.834 m (6.02 ft) from NGVD 29 to NAVD 88.)	Colorado	Mosquito Range	13,332 ft 4064 m	1,986 ft 605 m	9.61 mi 15.46 km	38.9917°N 106.1249°W
87	Tressider Peak	Alaska	Saint Elias Mountains	13,315 ft 4058 m	1,665 ft 507 m	3.32 mi 5.34 km	61.3590°N 141.6664°W
88	Summit Peak (Note: The summit of Summit Peak is the highest point of the southern San Juan Mountains.)	Colorado	San Juan Mountains	13,308 ft 4056.2 m	2,760 ft 841 m	39.6 mi 63.7 km	37.3506°N 106.6968°W
89	Middle Peak (Note: Dolores Peak may be higher than Middle Peak.) (Note: The elevation of Middle Peak includes an adjustment of +1.809 m (5.94 ft) from NGVD 29 to NAVD 88.)	Colorado	San Miguel Mountains	13,306 ft 4056 m	1,960 ft 597 m	4.78 mi 7.69 km	37.8536°N 108.1082°W
90	Antora Peak (Note: The elevation of Antora Peak includes an adjustment of +1.883 m (6.18 ft) from NGVD 29 to NAVD 88.)	Colorado	Sawatch Range	13,275 ft 4046 m	2,409 ft 734 m	6.75 mi 10.86 km	38.3250°N 106.2180°W
91	Henry Mountain (Note: The elevation of Henry Mountain includes an adjustment of +2.037 m (6.68 ft) from NGVD 29 to NAVD 88.)	Colorado	Sawatch Range	13,261 ft 4042 m	1,674 ft 510 m	10.94 mi 17.61 km	38.6856°N 106.6211°W
92	Hesperus Mountain (Note: The summit of Hesperus Mountain is the highest point of the La Plata Mountains.) (Note: The elevation of Hesperus Mountain includes an adjustment of +1.65 m (5.41 ft) from NGVD 29 to NAVD 88.)	Colorado	La Plata Mountains	13,237 ft 4035 m	2,852 ft 869 m	24.5 mi 39.5 km	37.4451°N 108.0890°W
93	Mount Silverthrone	Alaska	Alaska Range	13,220 ft 4029 m	3,240 ft 988 m	7.9 mi 12.72 km	63.1157°N 150.6755°W
94	Jacque Peak (Note: The elevation of Jacque Peak includes an adjustment of +1.866 m (6.12 ft) from NGVD 29 to NAVD 88.)	Colorado	Gore Range	13,211 ft 4027 m	2,065 ft 629 m	4.52 mi 7.28 km	39.4549°N 106.1970°W
95	Bennett Peak (Note: The elevation of Bennett Peak includes an adjustment of +1.782 m (5.85 ft) from NGVD 29 to NAVD 88.)	Colorado	San Juan Mountains	13,209 ft 4026 m	1,743 ft 531 m	17.08 mi 27.5 km	37.4833°N 106.4343°W
96	Wind River Peak (Note: The summit of Wind River Peak is the highest point of the southern Wind River Range.)	Wyoming	Wind River Range	13,197 ft 4022.4 m	2,572 ft 784 m	35.1 mi 56.6 km	42.7085°N 109.1284°W
97	Conejos Peak	Colorado	San Juan Mountains	13,179 ft 4017 m	1,912 ft 583 m	8.15 mi 13.12 km	37.2887°N 106.5709°W
98	Mount Marcus Baker (Note: The summit of Mount Marcus Baker is the highest point of the Chugach Mountains.)	Alaska	Chugach Mountains	13,176 ft 4016 m	10,751 ft 3277 m	126.3 mi 203 km	61.4374°N 147.7525°W
99	Cloud Peak (Note: The summit of Cloud Peak is the highest point of the Bighorn Mountains.) (Note: Cloud Peak is the northernmost 4000-meter (13,123-foot) summit of the Rocky Mountains.)	Wyoming	Bighorn Mountains	13,167 ft 4013.3 m	7,077 ft 2157 m	145 mi 233 km	44.3821°N 107.1739°W
99	Wheeler Peak (Note: The summit of Wheeler Peak is the highest point of the Taos Mountains and the U.S. State of New Mexico.) (Note: Wheeler Peak is the southernmost 4000-meter (13,123-foot) summit of the Rocky Mountains.)	New Mexico	Taos Mountains	13,167 ft 4013.3 m	3,409 ft 1039 m	37 mi 59.6 km	36.5569°N 105.4169°W

== Most prominent summits ==
Of the 50 most prominent summits of the United States, only Denali exceeds 5000 meters (16,404 feet) of topographic prominence, three peaks exceed 4000 meters (13,123 feet), ten peaks exceed 3000 meters (9843 feet), 45 peaks exceed 2000 meters (6562 feet), and all 50 peaks exceed 1932 meters (6339 feet) of topographic prominence. All of these peaks are ultra-prominent summits.

Of these 50 peaks, 27 are located in Alaska, five in Washington, five in California, three in Hawaiʻi, three in Wyoming, two in Nevada, two in Oregon, and one each in Colorado, Utah, and Arizona. Three of these summits lie on the international border between Alaska and Yukon, and one lies on the international border between Alaska and British Columbia.

The 50 most topographically prominent summits of the United States
Rank	Mountain peak	State	Mountain range	Elevation	Prominence	Isolation	Location
1	Denali (Mount McKinley)	Alaska	Alaska Range	20,310 ft 6190.5 m	20,146 ft 6141 m	7,450.24	63.0690°N 151.0063°W
2	Mauna Kea	Hawaiʻi	Island of Hawaiʻi	13,803 ft 4207.3 m	13,803 ft 4207 m	3,947.00	19.8207°N 155.4681°W
3	Mount Rainier	Washington	Cascade Range	14,417 ft 4394 m	13,210 ft 4026 m	1,176.72	46.8529°N 121.7604°W
4	Mount Fairweather (Fairweather Mountain)	Alaska; British Columbia	Saint Elias Mountains	15,325 ft 4671 m	12,995 ft 3961 m	124.4 mi 200 km	58.9064°N 137.5265°W
5	Mount Blackburn	Alaska	Wrangell Mountains	16,390 ft 4996 m	11,640 ft 3548 m	60.7 mi 97.6 km	61.7305°N 143.4031°W
6	Mount Hayes	Alaska	Alaska Range	13,832 ft 4216 m	11,507 ft 3507 m	125.5 mi 202 km	63.6203°N 146.7178°W
7	Mount Saint Elias	Alaska; Yukon	Saint Elias Mountains	18,009 ft 5489 m	11,250 ft 3429 m	25.6 mi 41.3 km	60.2927°N 140.9307°W
8	Mount Marcus Baker	Alaska	Chugach Mountains	13,176 ft 4016 m	10,751 ft 3277 m	126.3 mi 203 km	61.4374°N 147.7525°W
9	Mount Whitney	California	Sierra Nevada	14,505 ft 4421 m	10,080 ft 3072 m	2,649.47	36.5786°N 118.2920°W
10	Haleakalā (Note: The summit of Haleakalā is the highest point of the Island of Maui and the westernmost 3,000-meter (9,800-foot) summit of the United States.)	Hawaiʻi	Island of Maui	10,023 ft 3055 m	10,023 ft 3055 m	76.3 mi 122.9 km	20.7097°N 156.2533°W
11	Mount Shasta	California	Cascade Range	14,179 ft 4321.8 m	9,772 ft 2979 m	335 mi 539 km	41.4092°N 122.1949°W
12	Shishaldin Volcano (Note: The summit of Shishaldin Volcano is the highest point of Unimak Island and the Aleutian Islands.) (Note: Shishaldin Volcano is the westernmost summit of its elevation in Alaska, the United States, and greater North America.)	Alaska	Unimak Island	9,414 ft 2869 m	9,414 ft 2869 m	545 mi 877 km	54.7554°N 163.9709°W
13	Redoubt Volcano (Note: The summit of Redoubt Volcano is the highest point of the Chigmit Mountains.) (Note: Redoubt Volcano is the westernmost summit of its elevation in Alaska and greater North America.)	Alaska	Chigmit Mountains	10,197 ft 3108 m	9,147 ft 2788 m	58.7 mi 94.5 km	60.4854°N 152.7442°W
14	Mount Elbert	Colorado	Sawatch Range	14,440 ft 4401.2 m	9,093 ft 2772 m	1,079.15	39.1178°N 106.4454°W
15	Mount Baker (Note: The summit of Mount Baker is the highest point of the northern Cascade Range.) (Note: The elevation of Mount Baker includes an adjustment of +1.43 m (4.69 ft) from NGVD 29 to NAVD 88.)	Washington	Skagit Range	10,786 ft 3287 m	8,845 ft 2696 m	131.5 mi 212 km	48.7768°N 121.8145°W
16	Mount Torbert (Note: The summit of Mount Torbert is the highest point of the Tordrillo Mountains.) (Note: Mount Torbert is the westernmost summit of its elevation in Alaska and greater North America.)	Alaska	Alaska Range	11,413 ft 3479 m	8,688 ft 2648 m	97.7 mi 157.3 km	61.4086°N 152.4125°W
17	San Jacinto Peak (Note: The summit of San Jacinto Peak is the highest point of the San Jacinto Mountains.)	California	San Jacinto Mountains	10,834 ft 3302.3 m	8,339 ft 2542 m	20.3 mi 32.7 km	33.8147°N 116.6794°W
18	San Gorgonio Mountain (Note: The summit of San Gorgonio Mountain is the highest point of the San Bernardino Mountains.) (Note: The elevation of San Gorgonio Mountain includes an adjustment of +1.303 m (4.27 ft) from NGVD 29 to NAVD 88.)	California	San Bernardino Mountains	11,503 ft 3506 m	8,294 ft 2528 m	162.5 mi 262 km	34.0992°N 116.8249°W
19	Charleston Peak (Note: The summit of Charleston Peak is the highest point of the Spring Mountains.) (Mount Charleston)	Nevada	Spring Mountains	11,916 ft 3632 m	8,258 ft 2517 m	135.1 mi 218 km	36.2716°N 115.6956°W
20	Mount Pavlof (Note: The summit of Mount Pavlof is the highest point of the Alaska Peninsula.)	Alaska	Alaska Peninsula	8,250 ft 2515 m	8,200 ft 2499 m	94.3 mi 151.8 km	55.4173°N 161.8932°W
20	Mount Veniaminof (Note: The summit of Mount Veniaminof is the highest point of the Alaska Peninsula.)	Alaska	Alaska Peninsula	8,225 ft 2507 m	8,200 ft 2499 m	209 mi 337 km	56.2194°N 159.2975°W
22	Mount Adams	Washington	Cascade Range	12,281 ft 3743.4 m	8,136 ft 2480 m	45.8 mi 73.6 km	46.2024°N 121.4909°W
23	Mount Hubbard	Alaska; Yukon	Saint Elias Mountains	14,951 ft 4557 m	8,061 ft 2457 m	21.3 mi 34.4 km	60.3194°N 139.0726°W
24	Mount Isto (Note: The summit of Mount Isto is the highest point of the Brooks Range.) (Note: Mount Isto is the northernmost ultra-prominent summit of Alaska and the United States.)	Alaska	Brooks Range	8,976 ft 2736 m	7,901 ft 2408 m	394 mi 634 km	69.2025°N 143.8020°W
25	Iliamna Volcano (Note: Iliamna Volcano is the westernmost 3000-meter (9843-foot) summit of Alaska and greater North America.)	Alaska	Chigmit Mountains	10,016 ft 3053 m	7,866 ft 2398 m	33.6 mi 54.1 km	60.0321°N 153.0915°W
26	Mount Olympus (Note: The summit of Mount Olympus is the highest point of the Olympic Mountains.)	Washington	Olympic Mountains	7,980 ft 2432.3 m	7,838 ft 2389 m	108 mi 173.7 km	47.8013°N 123.7108°W
27	Mount Cook	Alaska; Yukon	Saint Elias Mountains	13,760 ft 4194 m	7,710 ft 2350 m	14.54 mi 23.4 km	60.1816°N 139.9811°W
28	Mount Hood (Note: The summit of Mount Hood is the highest point of the Oregon Cascades and the U.S. State of Oregon.)	Oregon	Cascade Range	11,249 ft 3428.8 m	7,706 ft 2349 m	57.3 mi 92.2 km	45.3735°N 121.6959°W
29	Mount Sanford	Alaska	Wrangell Mountains	16,237 ft 4949 m	7,687 ft 2343 m	40.3 mi 64.8 km	62.2132°N 144.1292°W
30	Mount Tom White	Alaska	Chugach Mountains	11,191 ft 3411 m	7,641 ft 2329 m	73 mi 117.6 km	60.6518°N 143.6972°W
31	Wheeler Peak (Note: The summit of Wheeler Peak is the highest point of the Snake Range.)	Nevada	Snake Range	13,065 ft 3982.3 m	7,568 ft 2307 m	232 mi 373 km	38.9858°N 114.3139°W
32	Glacier Peak (Note: The elevation of Glacier Peak includes an adjustment of +1.492 m (4.9 ft) from NGVD 29 to NAVD 88.)	Washington	Cascade Range	10,545 ft 3214 m	7,518 ft 2291 m	56 mi 90.2 km	48.1125°N 121.1138°W
33	Mount Kimball (Note: The summit of Mount Kimball is the highest point of the Delta Range.)	Alaska	Alaska Range	10,350 ft 3155 m	7,425 ft 2263 m	55.8 mi 89.8 km	63.2390°N 144.6419°W
34	Mount Griggs	Alaska	Alaska Peninsula	7,650 ft 2332 m	7,300 ft 2225 m	135.4 mi 218 km	58.3534°N 155.0958°W
35	Mount Foraker	Alaska	Alaska Range	17,400 ft 5304 m	7,250 ft 2210 m	14.27 mi 23 km	62.9604°N 151.3998°W
36	White Mountain Peak	California	White Mountains	14,252 ft 4344 m	7,196 ft 2193 m	67.4 mi 108.6 km	37.6341°N 118.2557°W
37	Mount Crillon	Alaska	Saint Elias Mountains	12,726 ft 3879 m	7,176 ft 2187 m	19.52 mi 31.4 km	58.6625°N 137.1712°W
38	Mauna Loa	Hawaiʻi	Island of Hawaiʻi	13,679 ft 4169 m	7,099 ft 2164 m	25.4 mi 40.8 km	19.4756°N 155.6054°W
39	Cloud Peak	Wyoming	Bighorn Mountains	13,167 ft 4013.3 m	7,077 ft 2157 m	145 mi 233 km	44.3821°N 107.1739°W
40	Gannett Peak	Wyoming	Wind River Range	13,809 ft 4209.1 m	7,076 ft 2157 m	290 mi 467 km	43.1842°N 109.6542°W
41	Mount Vsevidof (Note: The summit of Mount Vsevidof is the highest point of Umnak Island and the Fox Islands.) (Note: Mount Vsevidof is the westernmost 2000-meter (6562-foot) summit of Alaska, the United States, and greater North America.)	Alaska	Umnak Island	7,051 ft 2149 m	7,051 ft 2149 m	223 mi 358 km	53.1256°N 168.6938°W
42	Mount Hesperus (Note: The summit of Mount Hesperus is the highest point of the western Alaska Range.) (Note: Mount Hesperus is the westernmost summit of its elevation in Alaska and greater North America.)	Alaska	Alaska Range	9,828 ft 2996 m	6,978 ft 2127 m	58.1 mi 93.5 km	61.8036°N 154.1469°W
43	Mount Bona	Alaska	Saint Elias Mountains	16,550 ft 5044 m	6,900 ft 2103 m	49.7 mi 80 km	61.3856°N 141.7495°W
44	Mount Drum	Alaska	Wrangell Mountains	12,010 ft 3661 m	6,760 ft 2060 m	17.73 mi 28.5 km	62.1159°N 144.6394°W
45	Mount Chiginagak	Alaska	Aleutian Range	6,925 ft 2111 m	6,675 ft 2035 m	97.6 mi 157 km	57.1334°N 156.9912°W
46	Grand Teton	Wyoming	Teton Range	13,775 ft 4198.7 m	6,545 ft 1995 m	69.4 mi 111.6 km	43.7412°N 110.8024°W
47	Sacajawea Peak (Oregon) (Note: The summit of Sacajawea Peak (Oregon) is the highest point of the Wallowa Mountains and the Columbia Plateau.) (Note: The elevation of Sacajawea Peak (Oregon) includes an adjustment of +1.56 m (5.12 ft) from NGVD 29 to NAVD 88.)	Oregon	Wallowa Mountains	9,843 ft 3000 m	6,393 ft 1949 m	125.5 mi 202 km	45.2450°N 117.2929°W
48	Mount Neacola (Note: The summit of Mount Neacola is the highest point of the Neacola Mountains.)	Alaska	Aleutian Range	9,426 ft 2873 m	6,376 ft 1943 m	31 mi 49.9 km	60.7981°N 153.3959°W
49	Kings Peak	Utah	Uinta Mountains	13,534 ft 4125 m	6,358 ft 1938 m	166.6 mi 268 km	40.7763°N 110.3729°W
50	Mount Graham (Note: The summit of Mount Graham is the highest point of the Pinaleño Mountains.)	Arizona	Pinaleño Mountains	10,724 ft 3268.6 m	6,340 ft 1932 m	82.4 mi 132.6 km	32.7017°N 109.8714°W

== Most isolated major summits ==
Of the 50 most isolated major summits of the United States, only Denali exceeds 4000 kilometers (2485 miles) of topographic isolation, Mauna Kea exceeds 3000 kilometers (1864 miles), Mount Whitney exceeds 2000 kilometers (1243 miles), seven peaks exceed 1000 kilometers (621.4 miles), 12 peaks exceed 500 kilometers (310.7 miles), 44 peaks exceed 200 kilometers (124.3 miles), and all 50 peaks exceed 160 kilometers (99.42 miles) of topographic isolation.

Of these 50 peaks, 18 are located in Alaska, four in California, three in Washington, two in Hawaiʻi, two in Colorado, two in Wyoming, two in Arizona, two in Nevada, two in Utah, two in New York, two in Oregon, and one each in North Carolina, New Hampshire, Arkansas, West Virginia, New Mexico, Maine, Idaho, South Dakota, and Montana. One of these summits lies on the international border between Alaska and British Columbia.

The 50 most topographically isolated summits of the United States with at least 500 meters of topographic prominence
Rank	Mountain peak	State	Mountain range	Elevation	Prominence	Isolation	Location
1	Denali (Mount McKinley)	Alaska	Alaska Range	20,310 ft 6190.5 m	20,146 ft 6141 m	7,450.24	63.0690°N 151.0063°W
2	Mauna Kea	Hawaiʻi	Island of Hawaiʻi	13,803 ft 4207.3 m	13,803 ft 4207 m	3,947.00	19.8207°N 155.4681°W
3	Mount Whitney	California	Sierra Nevada	14,505 ft 4421 m	10,080 ft 3072 m	2,649.47	36.5786°N 118.2920°W
4	Mount Mitchell (Note: The summit of Mount Mitchell is the highest point of the Appalachian Mountains, the State of North Carolina, and the eastern United States.) (Note: Mount Mitchell is the easternmost 2000-meter (6562-foot) summit of the United States.) (Note: The elevation of Mount Mitchell includes an adjustment of +0.025 m (0.08 ft) from NGVD 29 to NAVD 88.)	North Carolina	Blue Ridge Mountains	6,684 ft 2037 m	6,092 ft 1857 m	1,913.49	35.7649°N 82.2651°W
5	Mount Washington (Note: The summit of Mount Washington is the highest point of the White Mountains, the State of New Hampshire, and the northeastern United States.) (Note: Mount Washington is the easternmost ultra-prominent summit of the United States.) (Note: The elevation of Mount Washington includes an adjustment of +0.02 m (0.07 ft) from NGVD 29 to NAVD 88.)	New Hampshire	White Mountains	6,288 ft 1917 m	6,158 ft 1877 m	1,318.95	44.2705°N 71.3032°W
6	Mount Rainier	Washington	Cascade Range	14,417 ft 4394 m	13,210 ft 4026 m	1,176.72	46.8529°N 121.7604°W
7	Mount Elbert	Colorado	Sawatch Range	14,440 ft 4401.2 m	9,093 ft 2772 m	1,079.15	39.1178°N 106.4454°W
8	Shishaldin Volcano	Alaska	Unimak Island	9,414 ft 2869 m	9,414 ft 2869 m	545 mi 877 km	54.7554°N 163.9709°W
9	Tanaga Volcano (Note: The summit of Tanaga Volcano is the highest point of Tanaga Island and the Andreanof Islands.) (Note: Tanaga Volcano is the westernmost summit of its elevation in Alaska, the United States, and greater North America.)	Alaska	Tanaga Island	5,925 ft 1806 m	5,925 ft 1806 m	407 mi 656 km	51.8838°N 178.1429°W
10	Mount Isto	Alaska	Brooks Range	8,976 ft 2736 m	7,901 ft 2408 m	394 mi 634 km	69.2025°N 143.8020°W
11	Signal Hill (Note: The summit of Signal Hill is the highest point of the Ouachita Mountains and the U.S. State of Arkansas.) (Note: The elevation of Signal Hill includes an adjustment of +0.075 m (0.25 ft) from NGVD 29 to NAVD 88.) (Mount Magazine)	Arkansas	Ouachita Mountains	2,753 ft 839 m	2,143 ft 653 m	381 mi 613 km	35.1671°N 93.6447°W
12	Mount Shasta	California	Cascade Range	14,179 ft 4321.8 m	9,772 ft 2979 m	335 mi 539 km	41.4092°N 122.1949°W
13	Gannett Peak	Wyoming	Wind River Range	13,809 ft 4209.1 m	7,076 ft 2157 m	290 mi 467 km	43.1842°N 109.6542°W
14	Mount Osborn (Note: The summit of Mount Osborn is the highest point of the Seward Peninsula.)	Alaska	Seward Peninsula	4,714 ft 1437 m	4,377 ft 1334 m	282 mi 453 km	64.9922°N 165.3294°W
15	Mount Igikpak (Note: The summit of Mount Igikpak is the highest point of the Schwatka Mountains.)	Alaska	Brooks Range	8,276 ft 2523 m	6,126 ft 1867 m	282 mi 453 km	67.4129°N 154.9656°W
16	Humphreys Peak (Note: The summit of Humphreys Peak is the highest point of the San Francisco Peaks and the U.S. State of Arizona.) (Note: The elevation of Humphreys Peak includes an adjustment of +1.345 m (4.41 ft) from NGVD 29 to NAVD 88.)	Arizona	San Francisco Peaks	12,637 ft 3852 m	6,039 ft 1841 m	246 mi 396 km	35.3464°N 111.6780°W
17	Wheeler Peak	Nevada	Snake Range	13,065 ft 3982.3 m	7,568 ft 2307 m	232 mi 373 km	38.9858°N 114.3139°W
18	Mount Vsevidof	Alaska	Umnak Island	7,051 ft 2149 m	7,051 ft 2149 m	223 mi 358 km	53.1256°N 168.6938°W
19	Mount Veniaminof	Alaska	Alaska Peninsula	8,225 ft 2507 m	8,200 ft 2499 m	209 mi 337 km	56.2194°N 159.2975°W
20	Kawaikini (Note: The summit of Kawaikini is the highest point of the Island of Kauaʻi.)	Hawaiʻi	Island of Kauaʻi	5,243 ft 1598 m	5,243 ft 1598 m	204 mi 328 km	22.0586°N 159.4973°W
21	Hall Island high point	Alaska	Hall Island	1,665 ft 507 m	1,665 ft 507 m	192.9 mi 310 km	60.6647°N 173.0887°W
22	Kuskokwim high point (Note: The summit of Kuskokwim high point is the highest point of the Kuskokwim Mountains.)	Alaska	Kuskokwim Mountains	5,250 ft 1600 m	4,475 ft 1364 m	191.6 mi 308 km	60.1159°N 159.3241°W
23	Spruce Knob (Note: The summit of Spruce Knob is the highest point of the Allegheny Mountains and the U.S. State of West Virginia.)	West Virginia	Allegheny Mountains	4,863 ft 1482.1 m	2,791 ft 851 m	175.4 mi 282 km	38.6999°N 79.5328°W
24	Kings Peak	Utah	Uinta Mountains	13,534 ft 4125 m	6,358 ft 1938 m	166.6 mi 268 km	40.7763°N 110.3729°W
25	Sierra Blanca Peak (Note: The summit of Sierra Blanca Peak is the highest point of the Sacramento Mountains.)	New Mexico	Sacramento Mountains	11,981 ft 3651.8 m	5,553 ft 1693 m	165.7 mi 267 km	33.3743°N 105.8087°W
26	San Gorgonio Mountain	California	San Bernardino Mountains	11,503 ft 3506 m	8,294 ft 2528 m	162.5 mi 262 km	34.0992°N 116.8249°W
27	Katahdin (Note: The summit of Katahdin is the highest point of the Longfellow Mountains and the U.S. State of Maine.) (Note: Katahdin is the easternmost 1000-meter (3281-foot) summit of the United States.)	Maine	Longfellow Mountains	5,270 ft 1606.4 m	4,293 ft 1309 m	158.3 mi 255 km	45.9044°N 68.9213°W
28	Peak 4030 (Note: The summit of Peak 4030 is the highest point of the Nulato Hills.)	Alaska	Nulato Hills	4,030 ft 1228 m	1,640 ft 500 m	158.2 mi 255 km	64.4535°N 159.4152°W
29	Mount Baldy (Note: The summit of Mount Baldy is the highest point of the White Mountains.)	Arizona	White Mountains	11,409 ft 3477.4 m	4,728 ft 1441 m	154 mi 248 km	33.9059°N 109.5626°W
30	Borah Peak (Note: The summit of Borah Peak is the highest point of the Lost River Range and the U.S. State of Idaho.)	Idaho	Lost River Range	12,668 ft 3861.2 m	6,002 ft 1829 m	150.8 mi 243 km	44.1374°N 113.7811°W
31	Cloud Peak	Wyoming	Bighorn Mountains	13,167 ft 4013.3 m	7,077 ft 2157 m	145 mi 233 km	44.3821°N 107.1739°W
32	Black Elk Peak (Note: The summit of Black Elk Peak is the highest point of the Black Hills and the U.S. State of South Dakota.) (Harney Peak)	South Dakota	Black Hills	7,244 ft 2208 m	2,932 ft 894 m	140.2 mi 226 km	43.8658°N 103.5324°W
33	Slide Mountain (Note: The summit of Slide Mountain is the highest point of the Catskill Mountains.)	New York	Catskill Mountains	4,180 ft 1274 m	3,295 ft 1004 m	136.4 mi 220 km	41.9992°N 74.3859°W
34	Mount Griggs	Alaska	Alaska Peninsula	7,650 ft 2332 m	7,300 ft 2225 m	135.4 mi 218 km	58.3534°N 155.0958°W
35	Charleston Peak (Mount Charleston)	Nevada	Spring Mountains	11,916 ft 3632 m	8,258 ft 2517 m	135.1 mi 218 km	36.2716°N 115.6956°W
36	Junipero Serra Peak (Note: The summit of Junipero Serra Peak is the highest point of the Santa Lucia Range.) (Note: The elevation of Junipero Serra Peak includes an adjustment of +0.971 m (3.19 ft) from NGVD 29 to NAVD 88.)	California	Santa Lucia Range	5,865 ft 1788 m	4,447 ft 1355 m	131.8 mi 212 km	36.1457°N 121.4191°W
37	Mount Baker	Washington	Skagit Range	10,786 ft 3287 m	8,845 ft 2696 m	131.5 mi 212 km	48.7768°N 121.8145°W
38	Mount Marcy (Note: The summit of Mount Marcy is the highest point of the Adirondack Mountains, the U.S. State of New York, and the drainage basins of the Gulf of Saint Lawrence and the Hudson River.)	New York	Adirondack Mountains	5,343 ft 1628.57 m	4,919 ft 1499 m	129.6 mi 209 km	44.1127°N 73.9237°W
39	Mount Marcus Baker	Alaska	Chugach Mountains	13,176 ft 4016 m	10,751 ft 3277 m	126.3 mi 203 km	61.4374°N 147.7525°W
40	Mount Hayes	Alaska	Alaska Range	13,832 ft 4216 m	11,507 ft 3507 m	125.5 mi 202 km	63.6203°N 146.7178°W
41	Sacajawea Peak (Oregon)	Oregon	Wallowa Mountains	9,843 ft 3000 m	6,393 ft 1949 m	125.5 mi 202 km	45.2450°N 117.2929°W
42	Steens Mountain (Note: The elevation of Steens Mountain includes an adjustment of +1.496 m (4.91 ft) from NGVD 29 to NAVD 88.)	Oregon	Steens Mountain	9,738 ft 2968 m	4,383 ft 1336 m	124.7 mi 201 km	42.6364°N 118.5767°W
43	Mount Fairweather (Fairweather Mountain)	Alaska; British Columbia	Saint Elias Mountains	15,325 ft 4671 m	12,995 ft 3961 m	124.4 mi 200 km	58.9064°N 137.5265°W
44	Tooth Benchmark (Note: The summit of Tooth Benchmark is the highest point of Saint Lawrence Island and the islands of the Bering Sea.)	Alaska	Saint Lawrence Island	2,207 ft 673 m	2,207 ft 673 m	112.5 mi 181.1 km	63.5920°N 170.3804°W
45	Delano Peak (Note: The summit of Delano Peak is the highest point of the Tushar Mountains.)	Utah	Tushar Mountains	12,174 ft 3710.7 m	4,709 ft 1435 m	112.1 mi 180.5 km	38.3692°N 112.3714°W
46	Mount Olympus	Washington	Olympic Mountains	7,980 ft 2432.3 m	7,838 ft 2389 m	108 mi 173.7 km	47.8013°N 123.7108°W
47	Black Mountain (Note: The summit of Black Mountain is the highest point of the De Long Mountains.)	Alaska	Brooks Range	5,020 ft 1530 m	3,346 ft 1020 m	103.5 mi 166.6 km	68.5598°N 160.3281°W
48	Blanca Peak	Colorado	Sangre de Cristo Mountains	14,351 ft 4374 m	5,326 ft 1623 m	103.4 mi 166.4 km	37.5775°N 105.4856°W
49	Mount Tozi (Note: The summit of Mount Tozi is the highest point of the Ray Mountains.)	Alaska	Ray Mountains	5,519 ft 1682 m	4,169 ft 1271 m	99.5 mi 160.1 km	65.6865°N 150.9498°W
50	Mount Cleveland (Note: The summit of Mount Cleveland is the highest point of the Lewis Range.)	Montana	Lewis Range	10,479 ft 3194 m	5,246 ft 1599 m	99.4 mi 159.9 km	48.9249°N 113.8482°W

== See also ==
- List of mountain peaks of North America
  - List of mountain peaks of Greenland
  - List of mountain peaks of Canada
  - List of mountain peaks of the Rocky Mountains
  - List of mountain peaks of the United States
    - List of mountains of the United States
    - List of the highest major summits of the United States
      - List of the major 4000-meter summits of the United States
      - List of the major 3000-meter summits of the United States
      - List of United States fourteeners
    - List of the most prominent summits of the United States
      - List of the ultra-prominent summits of the United States
    - List of the most isolated major summits of the United States
      - List of the major 100-kilometer summits of the United States
    - List of extreme summits of the United States
    - List of mountain peaks of Alaska
    - List of mountain peaks of Arizona
    - List of mountain peaks of California
    - List of mountain peaks of Colorado
    - List of mountain peaks of Hawaiʻi
    - List of mountain peaks of Idaho
    - List of mountain peaks of Montana
    - List of mountain peaks of Nevada
    - List of mountain peaks of New Mexico
    - List of mountain peaks of Oregon
    - List of mountain peaks of Utah
    - List of mountain peaks of Washington (state)
    - List of mountain peaks of Wyoming
  - List of mountain peaks of México
  - List of mountain peaks of Central America
  - List of mountain peaks of the Caribbean
- United States of America
  - Geography of the United States
  - Geology of the United States
    - Category:Mountains of the United States
      - commons:Category:Mountains of the United States
- Physical geography
  - Topography
    - Topographic elevation
    - Topographic prominence
    - Topographic isolation
