= Middle Peak (Colorado) =

Mountain in the state of Colorado

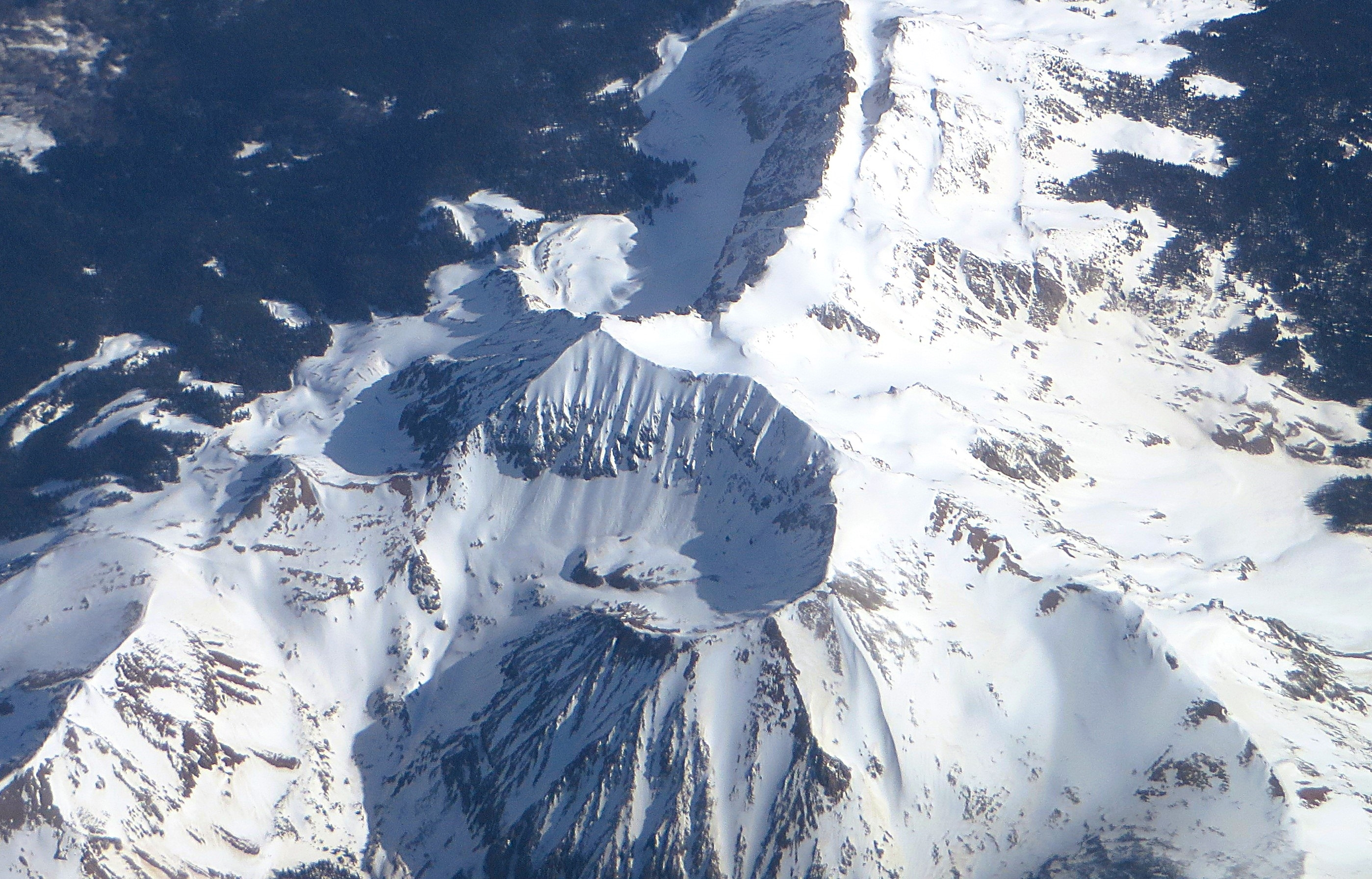
- Middle Peak centered, from airliner

Highest point
- Elevation: 13,306 ft (4,056 m)
- Prominence: 1,960 ft (597 m)
- Isolation: 5.50 mi (8.85 km)
- Listing: North America highest peaks 107th; US highest major peaks 88th; Colorado highest major peaks 47th
- Coordinates: 37°51′20″N 108°06′44″W

Geography
- Location within Colorado
- Location: Dolores and San Miguel counties, Colorado, United States
- Parent range: San Miguel Mountains
- Topo map(s): USGS 7.5' topographic map Dolores Peak, Colorado

Middle Peak is a high and prominent mountain summit in the San Miguel Mountains range of the Rocky Mountains of North America. The 13,306-foot (4,056 m) peak is located in the Lizard Head Wilderness, 17.1 miles (27.6 km) west-southwest (bearing 250°) of the Town of Telluride, Colorado, United States, on the drainage divide separating San Juan National Forest and Dolores County from Uncompahgre National Forest and San Miguel County.

== Topographic prominence ==
Neighboring Dolores Peak on the same drainage divide may be higher than Middle Peak. If this is the case, Dolores Peak would be the more topographically prominent of the two summits.

== Historical names ==
- Dolores Peak
- Middle Peak

== See also ==
- List of mountain peaks of North America
  - List of mountain peaks of the United States
    - List of mountain peaks of Colorado
