= East Buffalo Peak =

Mountain in the state of Colorado

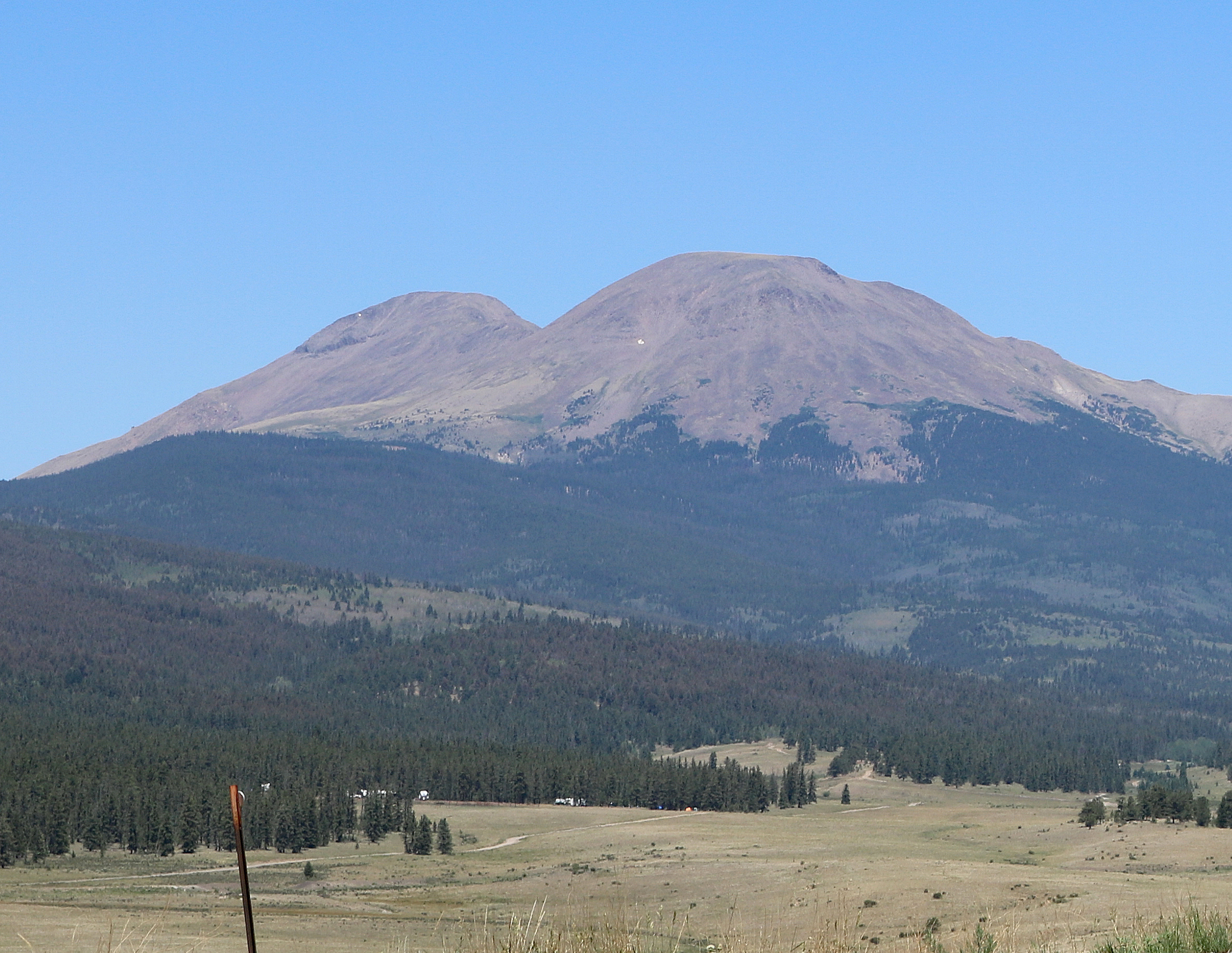
- East Buffalo Peak (right) and West Buffalo Peak

Highest point
- Elevation: 13,310 ft (4,060 m)
- Parent peak: Buffalo Peaks
- Coordinates: 38°59′14″N 106°06′34″W

Geography
- Location within Colorado
- Location: Chaffee and Park counties, Colorado, United States
- Parent range: Mosquito Range
- Topo map(s): USGS 7.5' topographic map Marmot Peak, Colorado

East Buffalo Peak, elevation 13,310 ft (4,060 m), is a summit in the Mosquito Range of central Colorado. East Buffalo Peak and West Buffalo Peak compose what is called Buffalo Peaks.

== See also ==
- Buffalo Peaks Wilderness
