= Mount Shishaldin =

Symmetrical volcano in Alaska

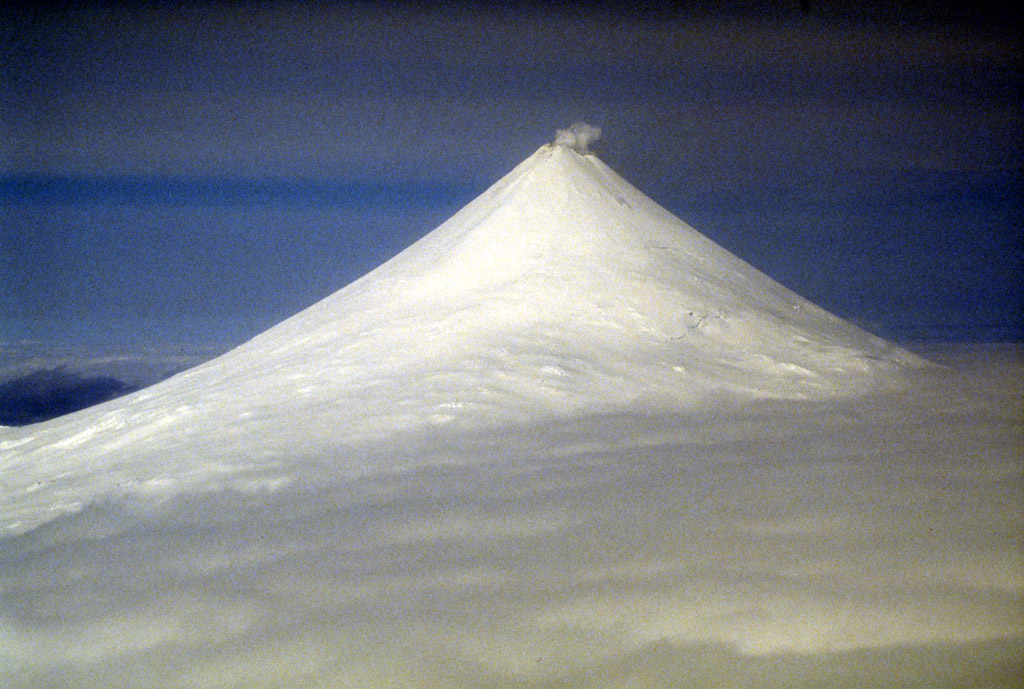
- Mount Shishaldin, May 1994

Highest point
- Elevation: 9,373 ft (2,857 m)
- Prominence: 9,373 ft (2,857 m)
- Isolation: 877 km (545 mi)
- Listing: Highest ocean islands 28th; World prominent peaks 115th; North America prominent 20th; North America isolated peak 10th
- Coordinates: 54°45′21″N 163°58′03″W

Geography
- Location within Alaska
- Interactive map of Mount Shishaldin
- Location: Unimak Island, Alaska, U.S.
- Parent range: Aleutian Range
- Topo map: USGS False Pass D-6

Geology
- Formed by: Subduction zone volcanism
- Mountain type: Stratovolcano
- Volcanic arc: Aleutian Arc
- Last eruption: 6 June 2026 (Ongoing)

Climbing
- First ascent: May 16, 1932 by G. Peterson et al. (first recorded ascent)
- Easiest route: East face:snow/glacier climb

U.S. National Natural Landmark
- Designated: 1967

Shishaldin Volcano, or Mount Shishaldin (/ʃɪˈʃældən/), is one of six active volcanoes on Unimak Island in the eastern Aleutian Islands of Alaska. It is the highest mountain peak of the Aleutian Islands, rising to a height of 9,373 ft (2,857 m) above sea level. It is located within Alaska Maritime National Wildlife Refuge. Shishaldin's magma supply is generated via flux melting above the Aleutian Trench, where the Pacific Plate subducts beneath the North American Plate. Due to its remote location and frequently inclement weather, the Alaska Volcano Observatory (AVO) monitors the volcano remotely via satellite and a seismic network deployed in 1997. Shishaldin is one of the most active volcanoes in the Aleutian Islands, with 40 confirmed eruptions in the last 11,700 years. Notably, Shishaldin produced a sub-Plinian (VEI 3) eruption in 1999.

== Name ==
The Aleuts named the volcano Sisquk or Sisagux, meaning "mountain which points the way when I am lost." The spelling Shishaldin comes from the Russian version, Шишалдина, of the Aleut name.

== Geography and geology ==
Shishaldin is located on Unimak Island, the easternmost of the Aleutian Islands. The nearest settlement to the volcano is False Pass (population ~100) at 45 km away. The view of Shishaldin from False Pass is obscured by the Round Top and Isanotski volcanoes, preventing direct observations of eruptions in many instances. The upper 6,600 ft (2,000 m) is almost entirely covered by glacial snow and ice. In all, Shishaldin's glacial shield covers about 35 mi^{2} (91 km^{2}). The Shishaldin cone is less than 10,000 years old and is constructed atop the remnants of the ancestral volcano. The modern cone is highly symmetrical, with near-perfect circular topographic contours above 6,500 ft (2,000 m), except for the newly formed (from the 2023 eruption) collapses near the summit. The Shishaldin edifice contains about 300 km^{3} (72 cu mi) of material. A very steady steam plume rises from its small summit crater which is about 500 ft (150 m) across and slightly breached along the north rim. The ancestral cone is exposed on the west and northeast sides of the volcano between 1,500 and 1,800 m elevation and hosts rougher topography than the modern cone. The west and northwest sides of the volcano are home to over 50 flank vents. These flank vents consist mostly of cinder cones with some maars and tuff cones; most vents produced explosive eruptions, however some cinder cones are associated with lava flows from effusive eruptions. In appearance, the volcano can vary from nearly completely white to almost all black, depending on the occurrence of ashfall deposits.

Shishaldin is one of many volcanic centers located along the 4,000 km Aleutian Arc, which stretches from Kamchatka, Russia, to mainland Alaska, United States. The Aleutian Arc is formed where the Pacific Plate subducts beneath the North American Plate. Subduction is orthogonal in the eastern 2,500 km of the arc, giving rise to active volcanism, and becomes increasingly oblique westward until the plate interface becomes strike-slip near Buldir Island and volcanism ceases. Magma generation occurs via flux melting, where the dehydration of hydrous minerals in subducted oceanic crust inputs water into and lowers the melting temperature of the peridotite mantle wedge above the subducted slab. Average magma composition in the Aleutian arc is typically basaltic to basaltic andesite. In addition to active volcanism, the Aleutian Arc hosts significant seismicity, with roughly 70 M_{W} 7.0+ earthquakes since 1900. The rupture zone of the 1957 M_{W} 7.1 earthquake extended to the western side of Unimak Island (where Shishaldin is located). In addition, the 1946 M_{W} 8.6 megathrust earthquake, associated with a significant tsunami, ruptured offshore of Unimak Island.

== Eruptive history ==
This volcano has had many recorded eruptions during the 19th and 20th centuries, and a couple of reports of volcanic activity in the area during the 18th century may have referred to Shishaldin as well. Written record of eruptive activity began in 1775 by Russian explorers and traders in the Aleutians. There have been 40 confirmed Holocene eruptions ranging from 0–3 on the Volcano Explosivity Index (VEI), the majority of which were VEI 2 eruptions. Shishaldin produces basaltic eruptions, typically Strombolian in style, and frequently produces ash clouds which rise tens of kilometers into the atmosphere. Lava flows are occasionally produced by the summit crater.

Because Shishaldin is rarely visible due to its remote location and inclement weather, Alaska Volcano Observatory (AVO) relies on remote sensing to detect eruptive activity. In 1997, AVO installed a network of six seismometers and one pressure sensor on the volcano. AVO also uses satellites sensitive to thermal anomalies and volcanic plumes to monitor Shishaldin for eruptive activity.

=== 1999 eruption ===
Shishaldin displayed thermal signals of unrest detected by satellite on February 9, 1999. Throughout February and March, remotely detected thermal and seismic signals exceeded background levels. Strombolian activity was confirmed on 17 April via overflight. Shishaldin produced a sub-Plinian (VEI 3) eruption on 19 April, ejecting basaltic tephra in two separate plumes which rose 9 and 16 km into the atmosphere. The plumes deposited ash and tephra on the southern slopes of the volcano and into the Pacific Ocean, and several lahars were documented on the north flanks. Intense Strombolian activity persisted for ~3 hours after the large explosive events. Several days of intermittent Strombolian activity followed, ash plumes again depositing material on the southern slopes of the volcano. The largest thermal anomaly and most significant seismic activity of the 1999 eruptive sequence were detected on 22–23 April; although there were no direct observations of the activity, the seismic and thermal signals closely resembled the intense Strombolian activity of 19 April. Activity then declined, although intermittent Strombolian activity continued for several months afterward.

Since the 1999 eruption, it has maintained seismic activity, typically having very low-magnitude volcanic earthquakes (most are below magnitude 1) every 1–2 minutes. During this period of non-eruptive seismic activity, it has been puffing steam, with puffs also occurring about every 1–2 minutes. There were reports in 2004 of small quantities of ash being emitted with the steam. In 2014, a low-level effusive eruption cycle started which lasted into 2016.

=== 2019 eruption ===
A new period of activity started in July 2019 with incandescence observed in the summit crater during a time of increased seismic activity. On July 23, an active lava lake and minor spattering within the summit crater was observed. A new lava effusion event began on October 13 advancing over the next several weeks. The summit cone partially collapsed on November 25, producing a pyroclastic flow down the northwest side of the volcano and a new lava flow. On December 12, a short-lived explosion from Shishaldin expelled an ash cloud to 20,000–25,000 ft (6,100–7,600 m). During late December, eruptive activity continued with lava flows and low-level explosive activity at the summit. On January 3, 2020, seismicity led to an ash cloud eruption that reached as high as 27,000 ft (8,200 m). Another large ash cloud was emitted on January 19, 2020. This event ended shortly afterwards with an abrupt end in seismicity. The lava flows emitted during the eruptive events have cut deep channels in the snow and ice mantle of the volcano's north slope.

=== 2023 eruption ===
After more than two years of dormancy, another eruptive cycle began and on 14 July 2023, the volcano emitted ash plumes up to 40,000 ft (12,000 m) high after several explosions at the summit. Fourteen significant explosive events occurred at Shishaldin between 12 July and 3 November 2023. For approximately a week following the November 3 explosive event, activity consisted of frequent small explosions, steam and gas emissions, and collapse events around the summit crater rim. By January 2024, only minor steam emissions and small events deep in the summit crater continued. The Alaska Volcano Observatory declared this eruptive cycle ended by late August 2024. As a result of the collapses in the summit during this eruption, the previously symmetrical summit crater now has a deep east–west trending notch.

== Climbing ==
The first recorded ascent of Shishaldin was in 1932, by G. Peterson and two companions. Given the straightforward nature of the climbing (Alaska Grade 1, snow up to 40 degree slope), it is possible that an earlier ascent occurred, either by native Aleuts, Russians, or other visitors. Shishaldin is rather unique in that its appearance changes very little to a climber during an ascent. A group climbing Shishaldin in May, 2005 set a base camp at 2,500 ft (760 m) on the east side after a four-day hike and ski trip from the village of False Pass. As they climbed the cone, they noted "we could never believe it was so tall since the summit always looked 'so close'. Yet it never seemed to get any closer!" It took that group about 8 hours to climb to the top. Shishaldin is a popular ski descent (6,000 ft (1,800 m) vertical) for local climbers (of whom there are few). Due to its remoteness, Shishaldin is not often climbed by outsiders.

== Gallery ==
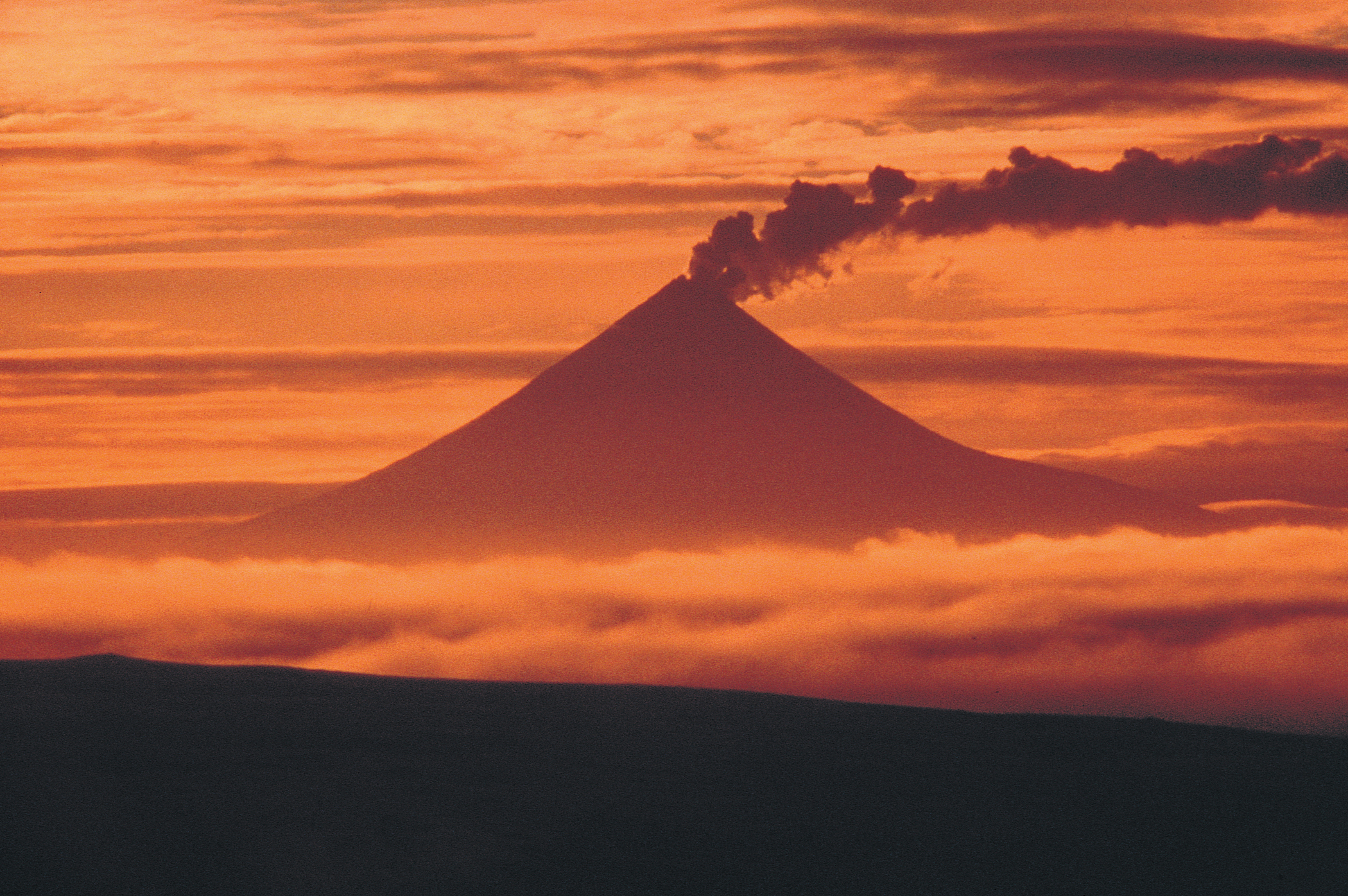
An image of the volcano at sunset from 2005

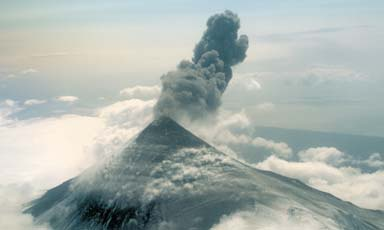
A view of the volcano's 1999 eruption.

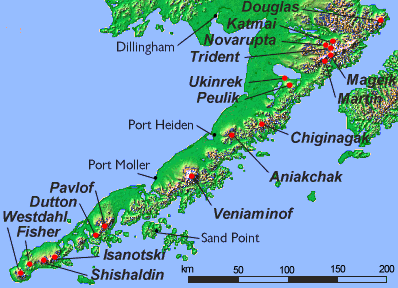
Map showing volcanoes of Alaska Peninsula.

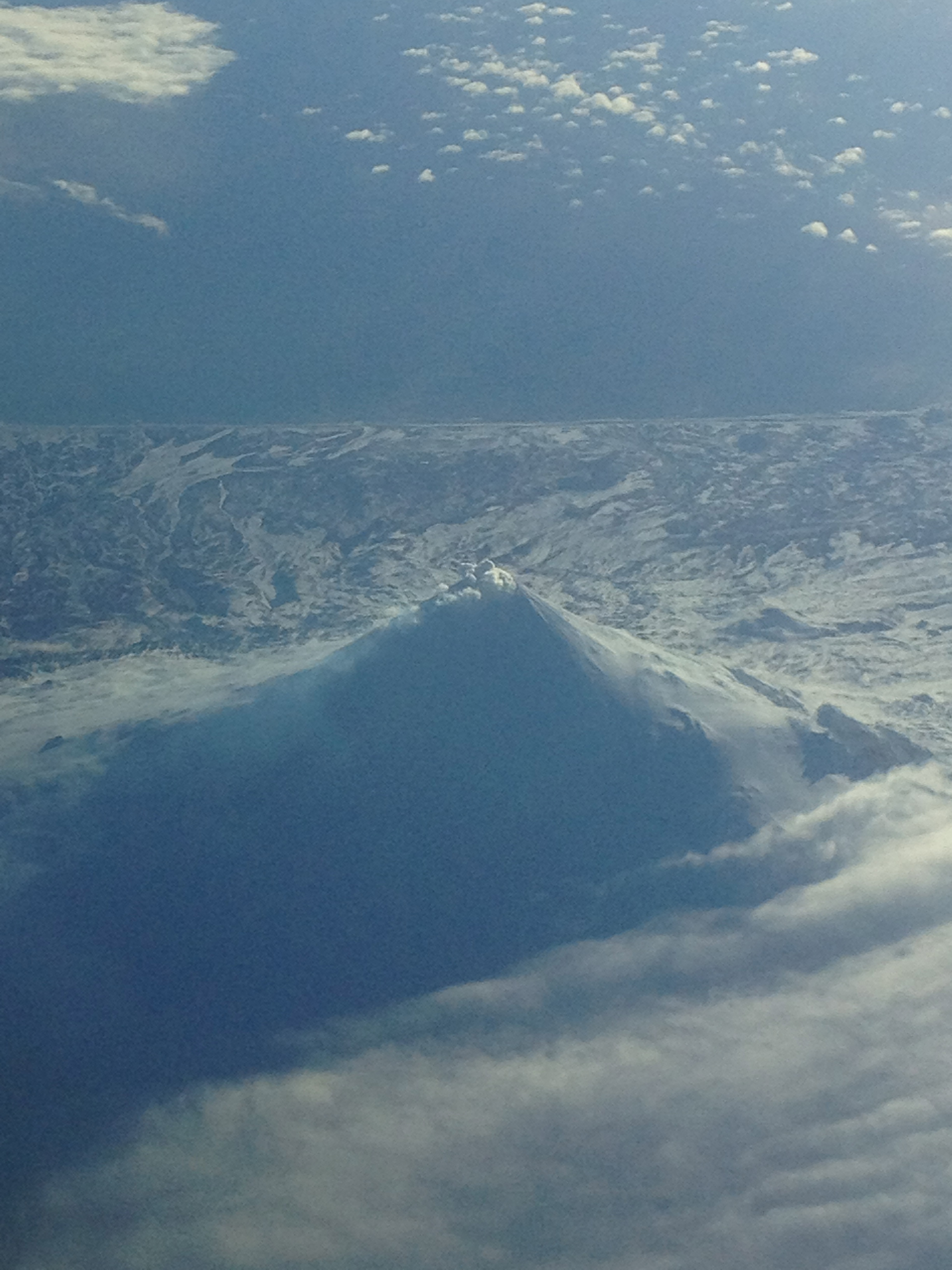
An overhead view of the volcano from November 24, 2013

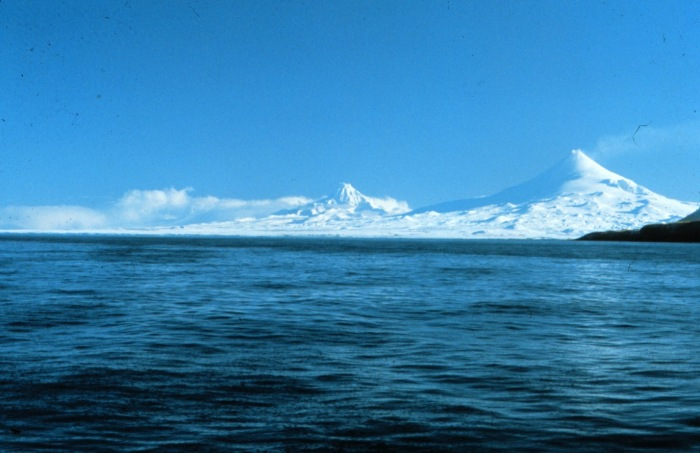
Shishaldin and Isanotski Volcanoes.

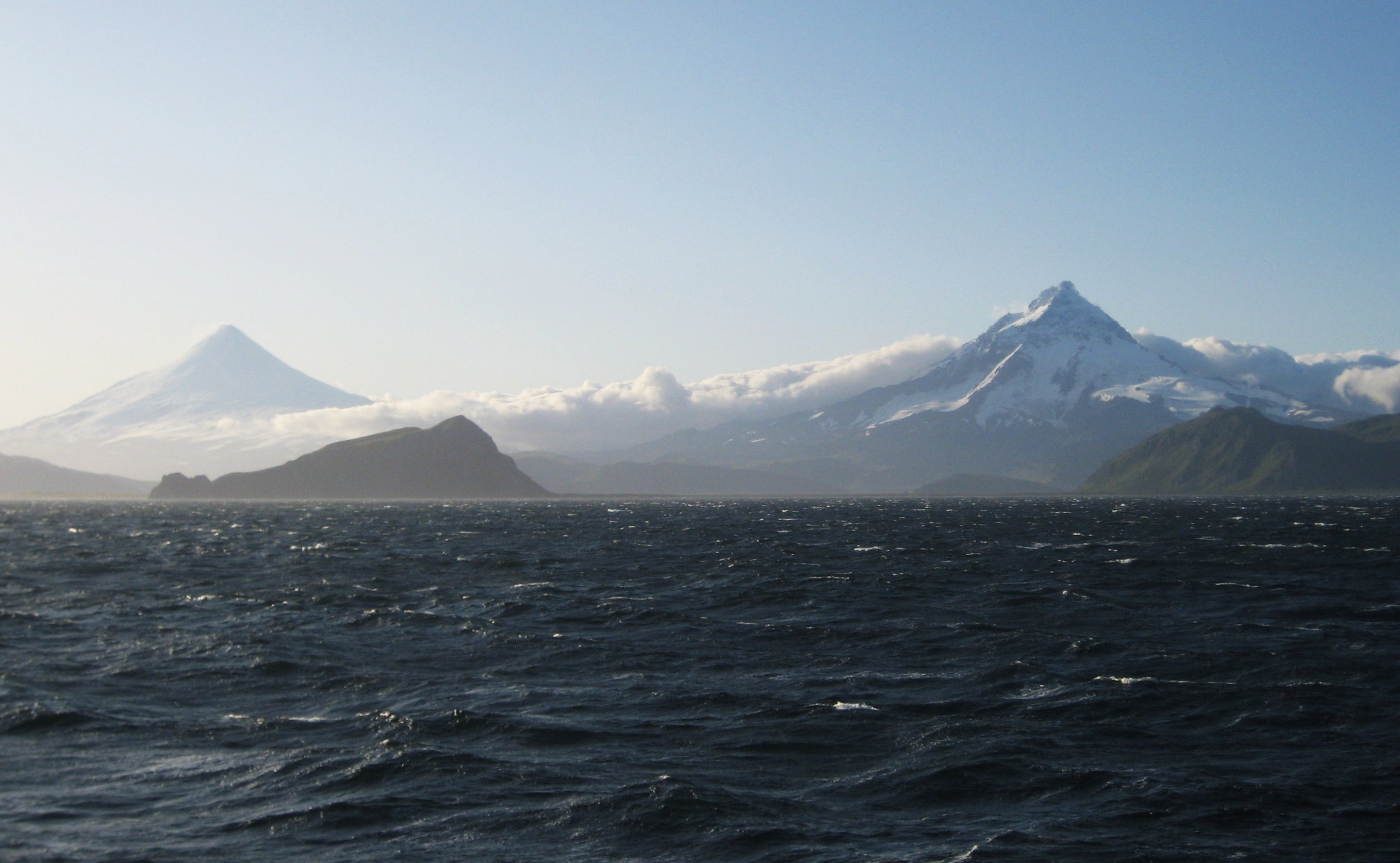
Shishaldin (left) and Isanotski volcanoes on Unimak Island.

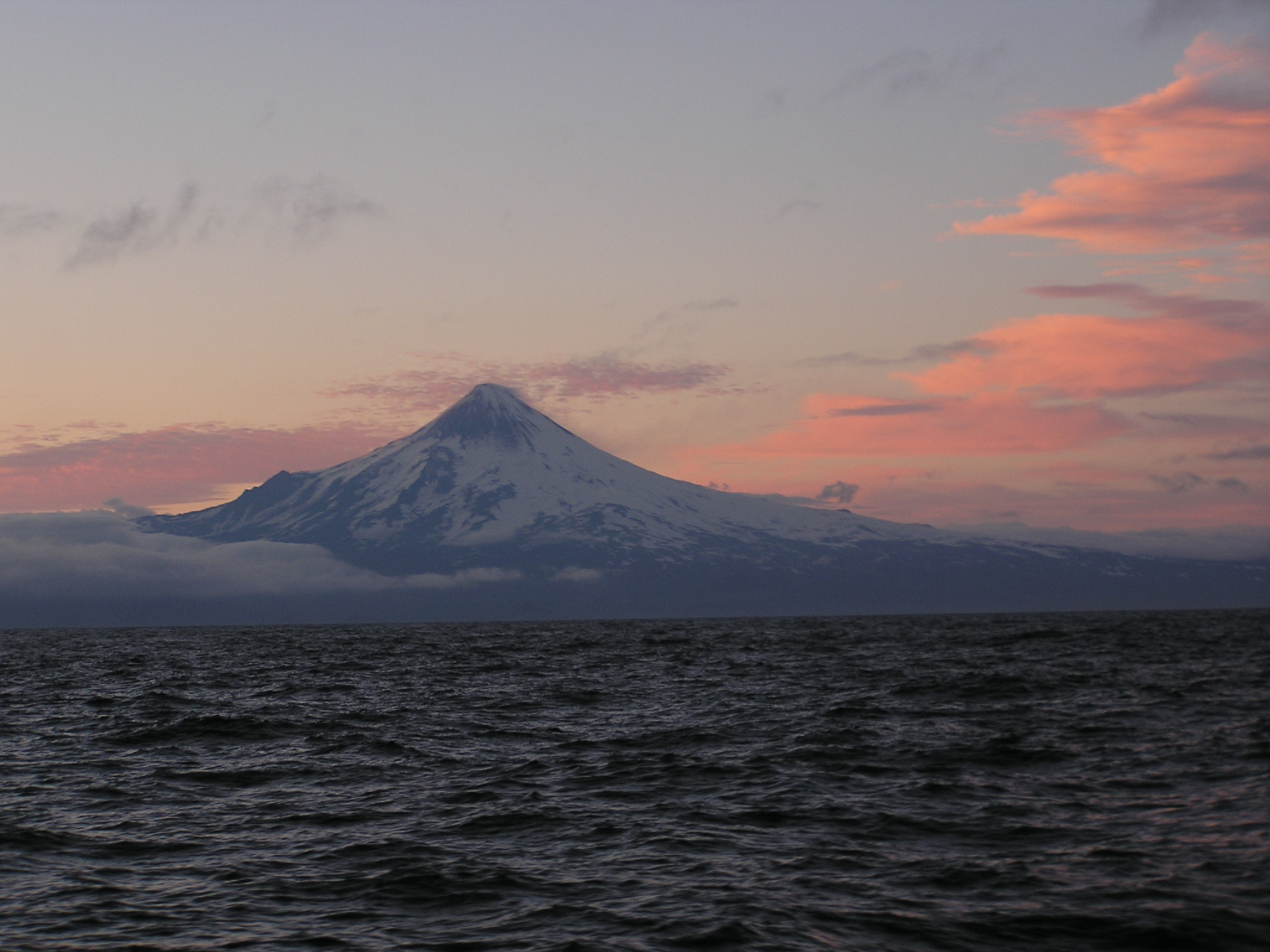
Shishaldin Volcano on the west end of Unimak Island.

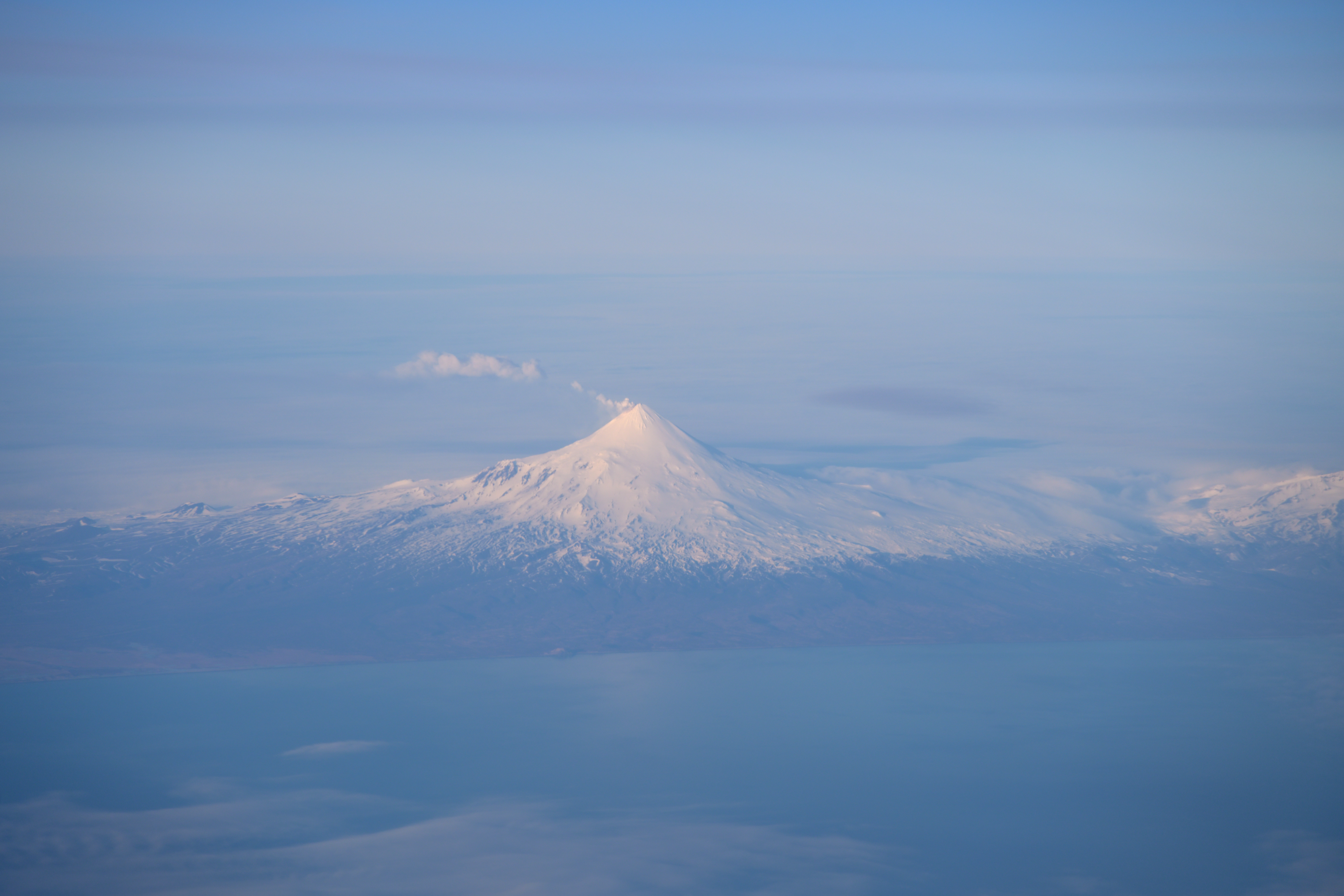
The volcano in 2026, as seen from the south on a passing flight

== See also ==
- List of mountain peaks of North America
  - List of mountain peaks of the United States
    - List of mountain peaks of Alaska
- List of Ultras of the United States
- List of volcanoes in the United States
