= West Buffalo Peak =

Mountain in the state of Colorado

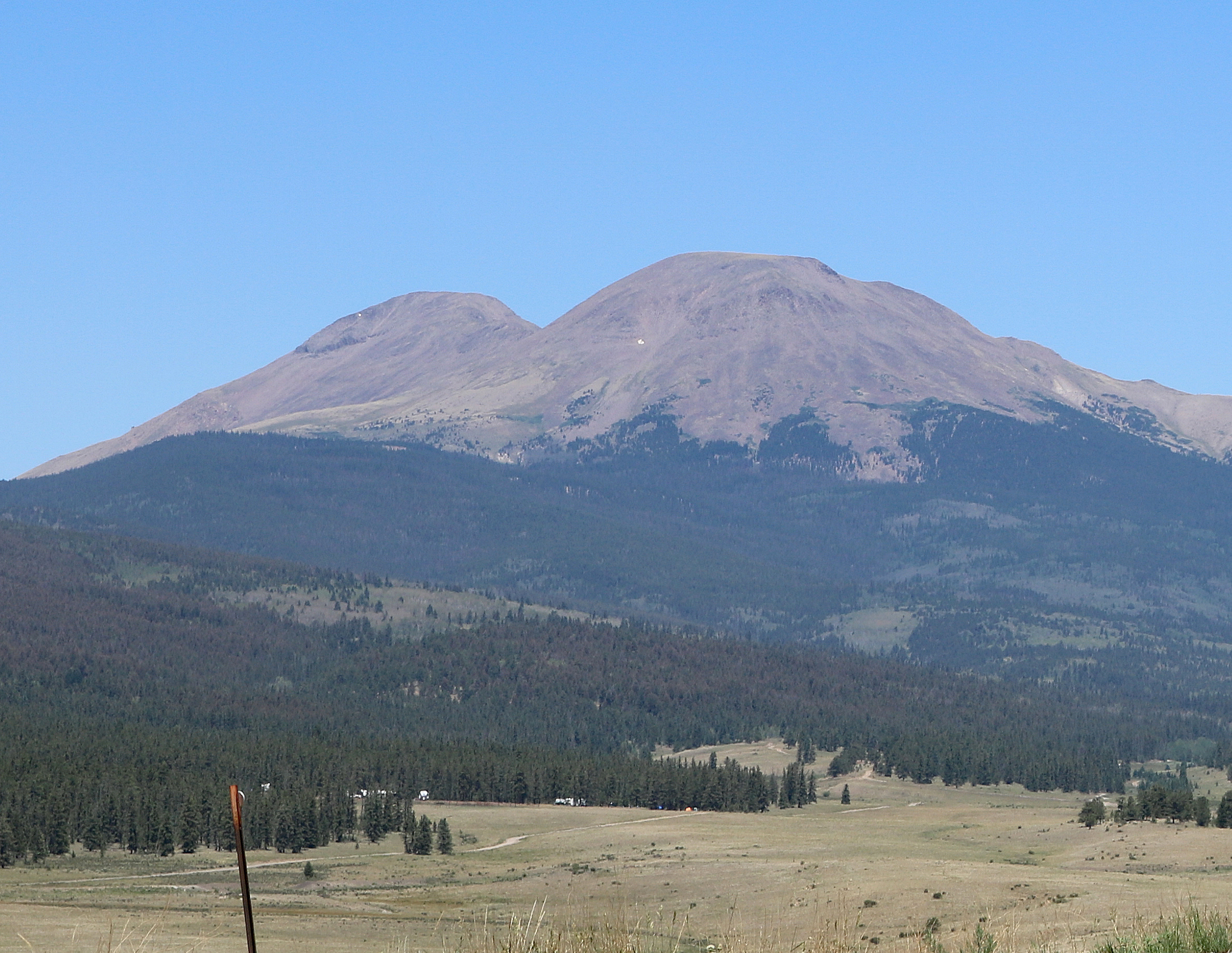
- West Buffalo Peak (left) and East Buffalo Peak

Highest point
- Elevation: 13,332 ft (4,064 m)
- Prominence: 1,986 ft (605 m)
- Isolation: 9.61 mi (15.47 km)
- Listing: North America highest peaks 103rd; US highest major peaks 85th; Colorado highest major peaks 45th
- Coordinates: 38°59′30″N 106°07′30″W

Geography
- Location within Colorado
- Location: Chaffee and Park counties, Colorado, United States
- Parent range: Mosquito Range
- Topo map(s): USGS 7.5' topographic map Harvard Lakes, Colorado

West Buffalo Peak, elevation 13,327 ft (4,062 m), is a summit in the Mosquito Range of central Colorado. The mountain is the highest peak of the Buffalo Peaks, slightly taller than East Buffalo Peak. It is located in the Buffalo Peaks Wilderness.

== See also ==
- Buffalo Peaks Wilderness
- List of mountain peaks of North America
  - List of mountain peaks of the United States
    - List of mountain peaks of Colorado
