= Bald Mountain (Summit County, Colorado) =

Mountain in the American state of Colorado

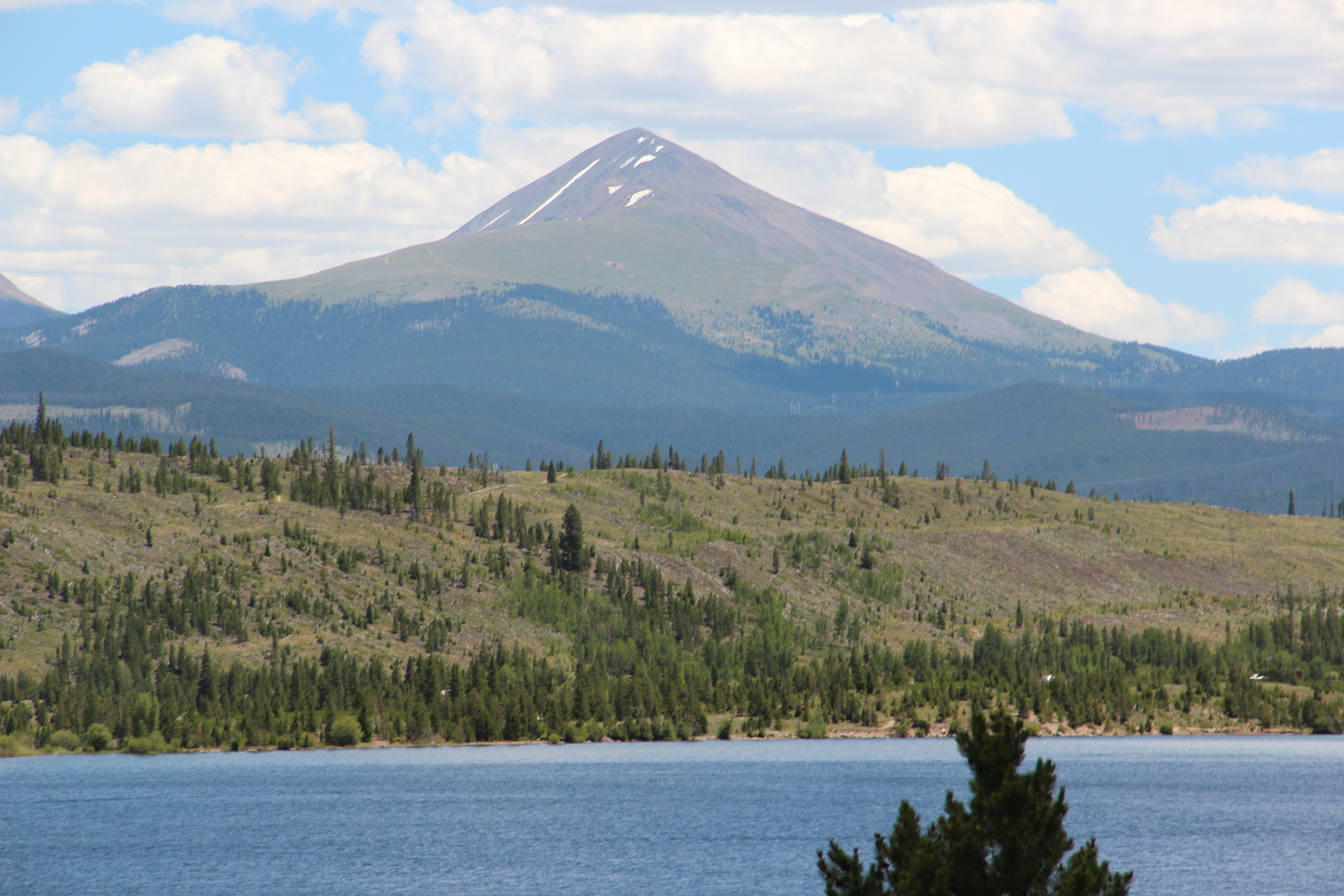
- Bald Mountain viewed from Dillon Reservoir

Highest point
- Elevation: 13,690 ft (4,173 m)
- Prominence: 2,099 ft (640 m)
- Isolation: 7.51 mi (12.09 km)
- Listing: North America highest peaks 82nd; US highest major peaks 64th; Colorado highest major peaks 31st
- Coordinates: 39°26′38″N 105°58′10″W

Geography
- Location within Colorado
- Location: Summit County, Colorado, U.S.
- Parent range: Front Range
- Topo map(s): USGS 7.5' topographic map Boreas Pass, Colorado

Climbing
- Easiest route: Hike

Bald Mountain is a high and prominent mountain summit in the Front Range of the Rocky Mountains of North America. The 13,690-foot (4,173 m) thirteener is located in White River National Forest, 5.5 miles (8.9 km) southeast (bearing 135°) of the Town of Breckenridge in Summit County, Colorado, United States.

It may be reached by a technically-undemanding though long and roundabout route from Breckenridge, initially through forest and then open country; though as for all mountains of this elevation, altitude sickness is a potential danger as well as afternoon thunderstorms.

Extensive views of the surrounding area may be enjoyed from the summit on a clear day.

== Climate ==
Climate data for Bald Mountain (Summit County) 39.4434 N, 105.9682 W, Elevation: 13,209 ft (4,026 m) (1991–2020 normals)
Month	Jan	Feb	Mar	Apr	May	Jun	Jul	Aug	Sep	Oct	Nov	Dec	Year
Mean daily maximum °F (°C)	20.3 (−6.5)	19.6 (−6.9)	26.6 (−3.0)	33.3 (0.7)	41.8 (5.4)	52.7 (11.5)	58.9 (14.9)	56.4 (13.6)	50.3 (10.2)	38.9 (3.8)	27.2 (−2.7)	20.5 (−6.4)	37.2 (2.9)
Daily mean °F (°C)	10.2 (−12.1)	9.4 (−12.6)	15.2 (−9.3)	20.9 (−6.2)	29.7 (−1.3)	40.0 (4.4)	46.3 (7.9)	44.5 (6.9)	38.2 (3.4)	27.6 (−2.4)	17.3 (−8.2)	10.6 (−11.9)	25.8 (−3.5)
Mean daily minimum °F (°C)	0.0 (−17.8)	−0.8 (−18.2)	3.8 (−15.7)	8.6 (−13.0)	17.7 (−7.9)	27.4 (−2.6)	33.8 (1.0)	32.5 (0.3)	26.1 (−3.3)	16.3 (−8.7)	7.5 (−13.6)	0.6 (−17.4)	14.5 (−9.7)
Average precipitation inches (mm)	2.12 (54)	2.13 (54)	2.59 (66)	3.30 (84)	2.56 (65)	1.47 (37)	2.92 (74)	2.97 (75)	2.09 (53)	2.08 (53)	2.19 (56)	2.11 (54)	28.53 (725)
Source: PRISM Climate Group

== Mountain ==
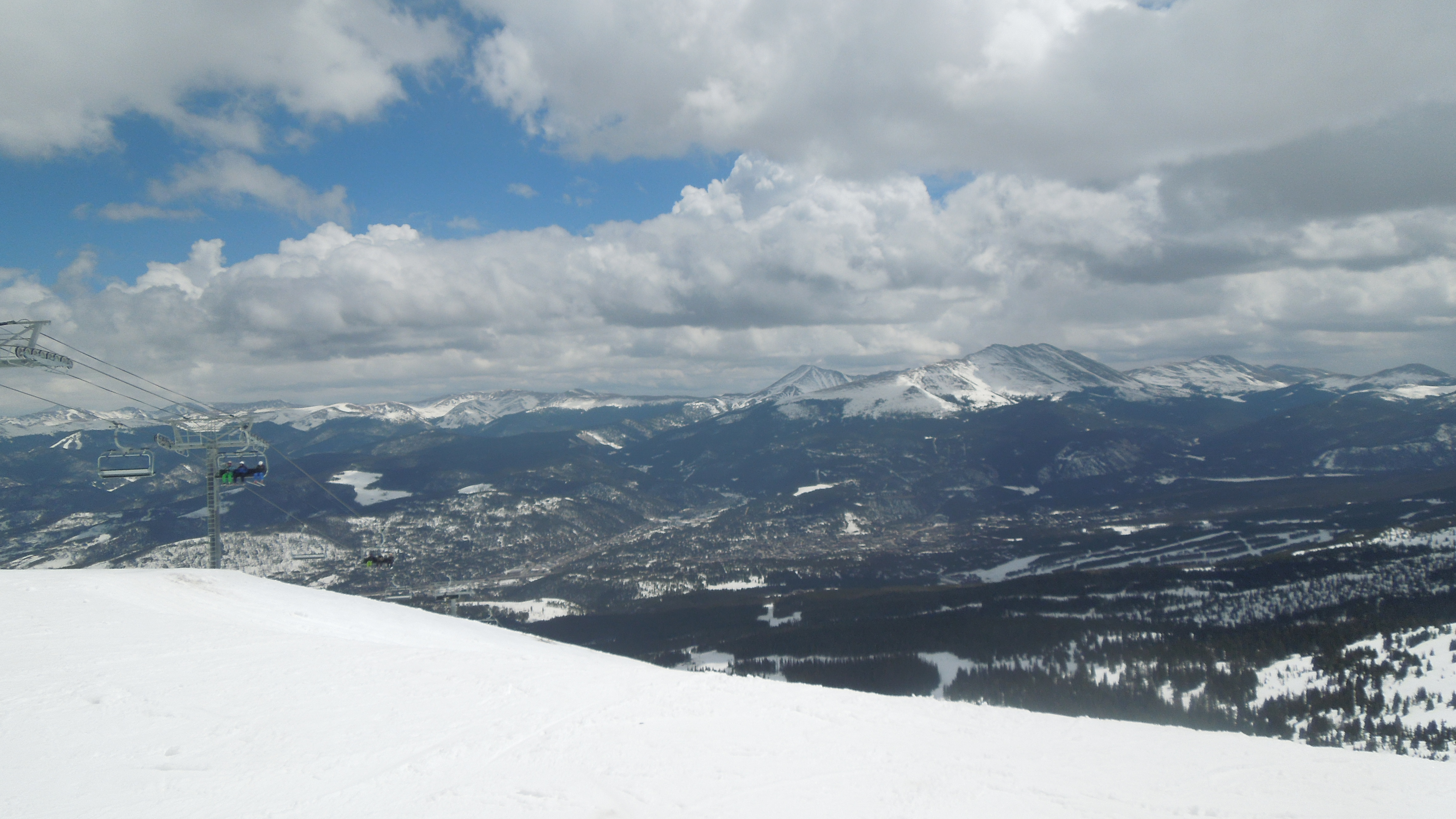
A view of Bald Mountain from the top of the Kensho SuperChair at Breckenridge Ski Resort

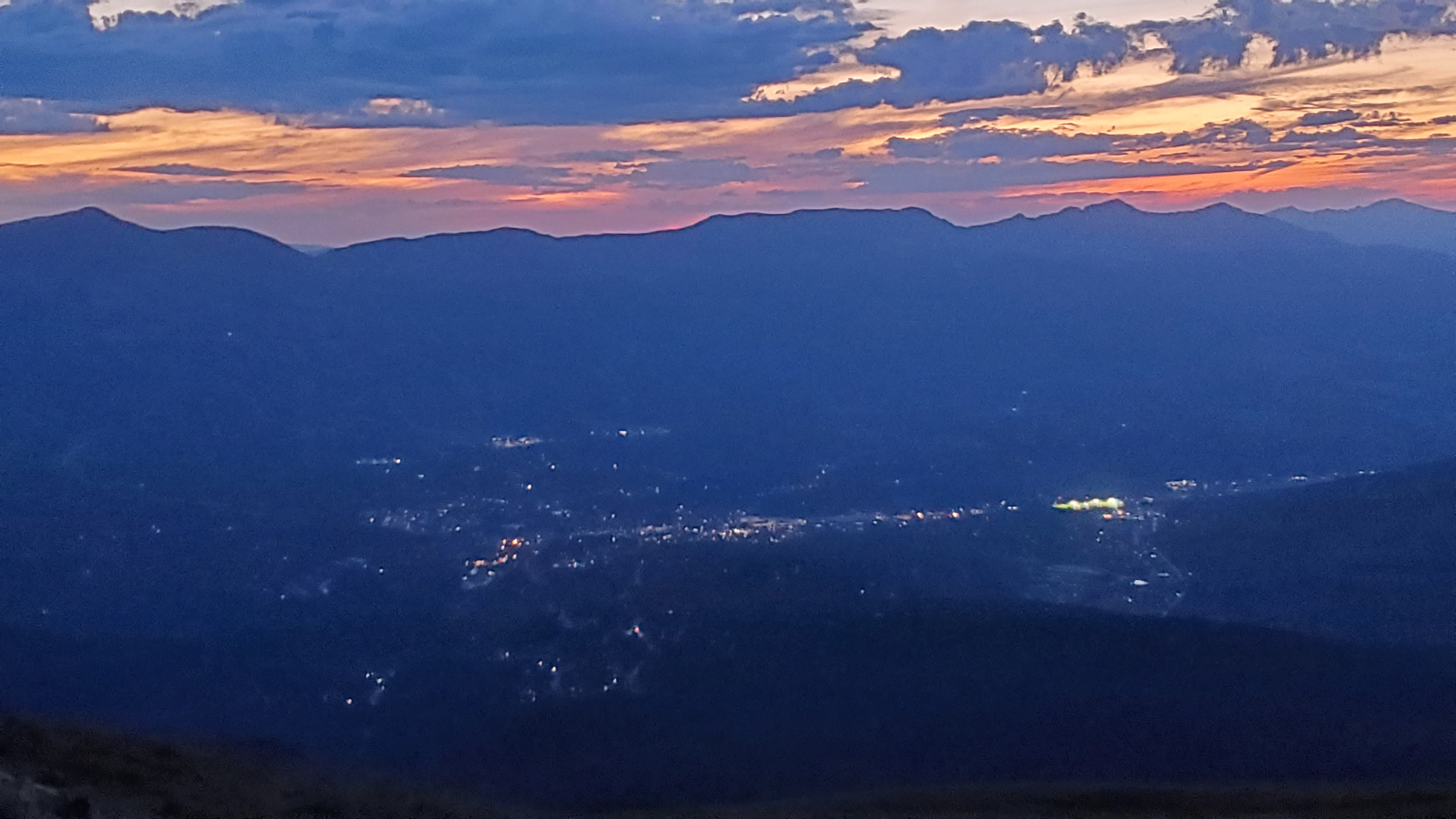
A View of the town of Breckenridge from Bald Mountain with the sun setting

== See also ==
- List of mountain peaks of North America
  - List of mountain peaks of the United States
    - List of mountain peaks of Colorado
