= Buffalo Peaks Wilderness =

Protected area in Colorado, US

- IUCN category Ib (wilderness area)
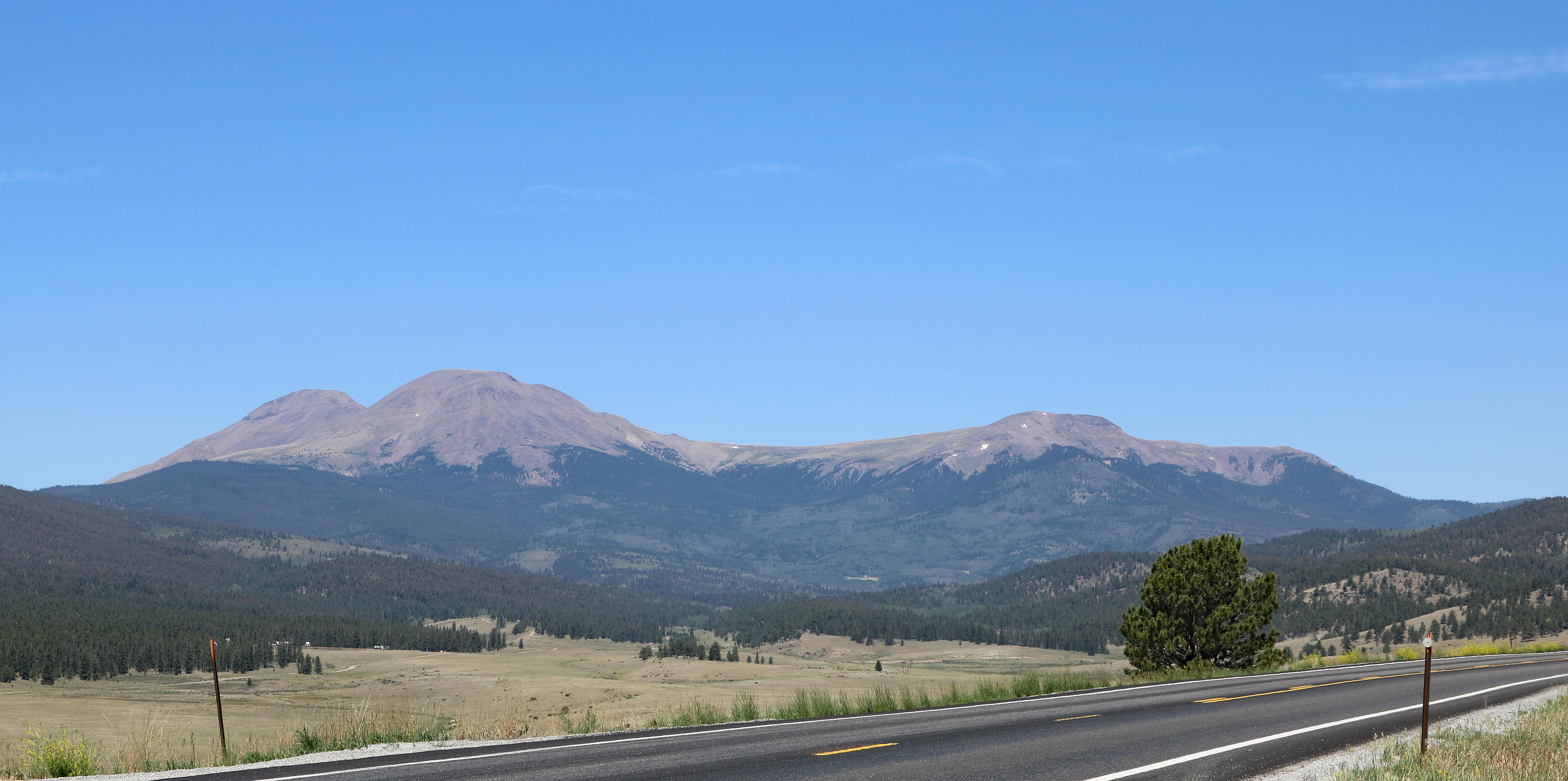
- Looking northwest from Highway 285

- Location within Colorado Location within the United States
- Location: Park / Chaffee / Lake counties, Colorado, USA
- Nearest city: Leadville, CO
- Coordinates: 39°03′00″N 106°09′00″W
- Area: 43,410 acres (175.7 km^{2})
- Established: 1993
- Governing body: U.S. Forest Service

The Buffalo Peaks Wilderness is a U.S. Wilderness Area located in San Isabel and Pike National Forests in central Colorado. The 43,410-acre (175.7 km^{2}) wilderness was named after two highly eroded volcanic mountains, East Buffalo Peak and West Buffalo Peak, in the Mosquito Range and was established in 1993. The wilderness contains Colorado's largest herd of bighorn sheep.

== See also ==
- East Buffalo Peak
- West Buffalo Peak
