= Mount Vsevidof =

Volcano in Alaska, United States

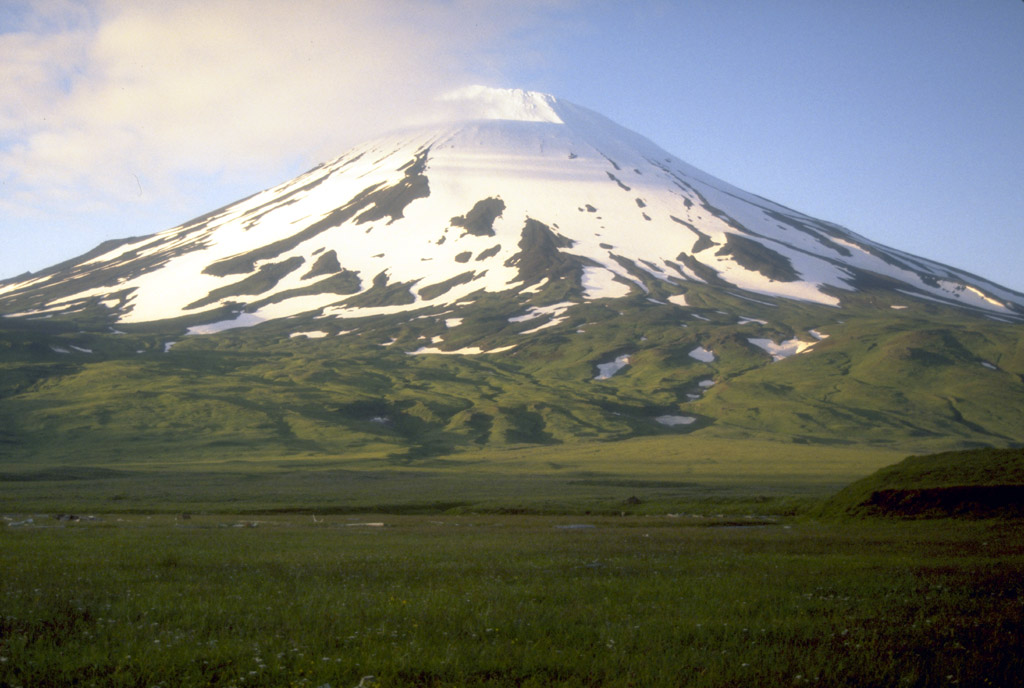
- View, looking north, of Mount Vsevidof

Highest point
- Elevation: 7,051 ft (2,149 m)
- Prominence: 7,051 ft (2,149 m)
- Listing: Highest ocean islands 68th; North America prominent 76th; North America isolated peak 53rd
- Coordinates: 53°07′27″N 168°41′24″W

Geography
- Location within Alaska
- Location: Umnak Island, Alaska, U.S.
- Parent range: Aleutian Range

Geology
- Formed by: Subduction zone volcanism
- Mountain type: Stratovolcano
- Volcanic arc: Aleutian Arc
- Last eruption: March 11-12, 1957 (questionable)

Mount Vsevidof (/ˌvɪzəˈviːdɒf/ or /vəˈʃeɪvɪdɒf/; Russian: Вулкан Всевидова) is a stratovolcano in the U.S. state of Alaska. Its summit is the highest point on Umnak Island, one of the eastern Aleutian Islands. Its symmetrical cone rises abruptly from its surroundings. The base of the volcano is around 10 km (6 mi) wide, steepening from about 15 degrees at 300 m (980 ft) altitude to around 30 degrees near the summit. Some glacial tongues have cut through narrow canyons up to 120 m (390 ft) deep, due to ice filling the crater and extending down the north and east flanks of the cone. It is most likely that Mount Vsevidof has not erupted in historic time. Reports of its latest eruption in 1957 is considered questionable by the Alaska Volcano Observatory. (Note: This is recorded as a "questionable eruption" by the Alaska Volcano Observatory (Vsevidof History Page).) This also includes possible eruptions or activity which may have occurred at the volcano in 1784, 1790, 1830, 1878, and 1880.

The theory that its name comes from Russian words for “all” and “sight”, suggesting that it was implied to mean “seen from everywhere” or “where every place is seen from”, seems incorrect. The volcano was discovered by the Russian explorer Gavriil Pribylov, who navigated the Aleutians between 1773 and 1786, likely named the volcano to honor of the Russian explorers - either Andrew Vsevidov or Piotr Vsevidov, both of whom made significant contributions to the exploration of the Aleutian Islands during the 1740s and 1750s.

Nearby towns to Vsevidof include Nikolski, Unalaska, Akutan, Atka, and Anchorage.

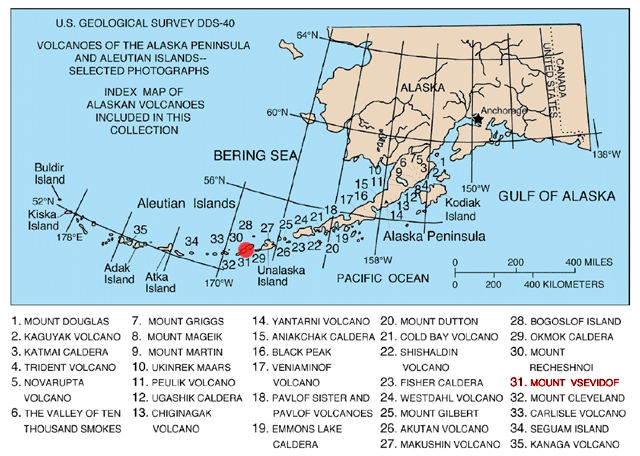
Map showing volcanoes of Alaska. The mark is set at the location of Mount Vsevidof.

== See also ==
- List of mountain peaks of North America
  - List of mountain peaks of the United States
    - List of mountain peaks of Alaska
- List of Ultras of the United States
- List of volcanoes in the United States
