= Dolores Peak =

Mountain in the state of Colorado

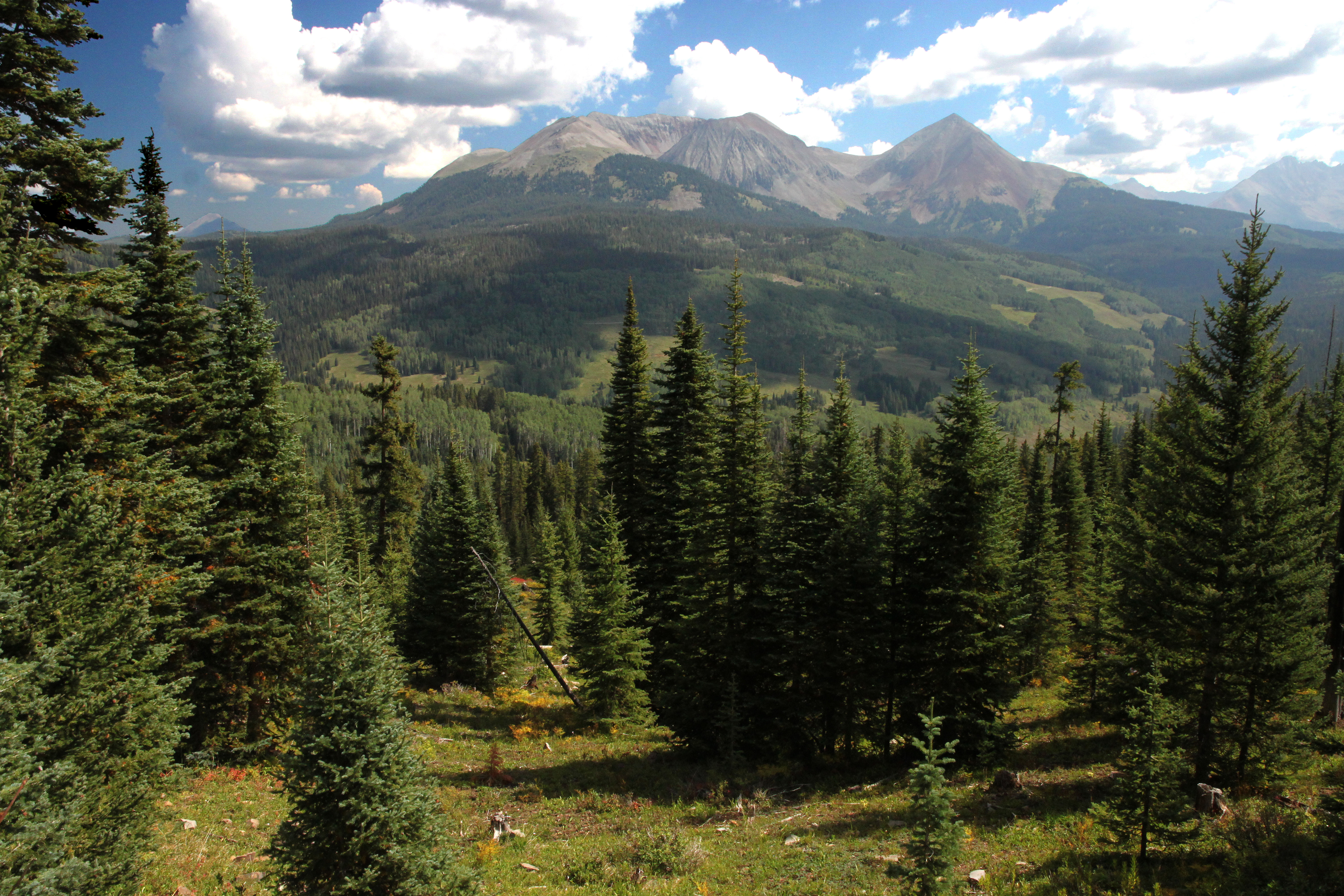
- Dolores Peak to right, from southwest

Highest point
- Elevation: 13,296 ft (4,053 m)
- Prominence: 730 ft (223 m)
- Parent peak: Middle Peak
- Isolation: 1.12 mi (1.80 km)
- Coordinates: 37°50′25″N 108°05′47″W

Geography
- Location within Colorado
- Location: Dolores and San Miguel counties, Colorado, United States
- Parent range: San Miguel Mountains
- Topo map(s): USGS 7.5' topographic map Dolores Peak, Colorado

Dolores Peak is a high mountain summit in the San Miguel Mountains range of the Rocky Mountains of North America. The 13,296-foot (4,053 m) thirteener is located in the Lizard Head Wilderness, 16.7 miles (26.9 km) west-southwest (bearing 246°) of the Town of Telluride, Colorado, United States, on the drainage divide separating San Juan National Forest and Dolores County from Uncompahgre National Forest and San Miguel County.

== Topographic prominence ==
Dolores Peak may be higher than neighboring Middle Peak on the same drainage divide. If this is the case, Dolores Peak would be the more topographically prominent of the two summits.

== Historical names ==
- Dolores Mountain
- Dolores Peak – 1965
- Dunn Peak
- Dunns Peak

== See also ==
- List of mountain peaks of North America
  - List of mountain peaks of the United States
    - List of mountain peaks of Colorado
