= Nulato Hills =

Mountain range in Alaska, United States

- Location within Alaska

Highest point
- Peak: Peak 4030
- Elevation: 4,030 ft (1,230 m)

Geography
- Country: United States
- State: Alaska
- District(s): Nome Census Area; Yukon–Koyukuk Census Area
- Range coordinates: 63°58′N 160°13′W
- Topo map: USGS

The Nulato Hills are a mountain range in western Alaska between the Yukon River and Norton Sound. In the north, they merge into the lowlands of the Selawik River, in the south they extend into the Yukon-Kuskokwim Delta. At the Seward Peninsula level, the continental divide runs through the Nulato Hills. The Anvik River and the Bonasila River have their source in the Nulato Hills.

The extension in north–south direction is about 480 km (298 mi), in east–west up to 130 km (81 mi). The highest mountain in the Nulato Hills is Peak 4030 at 4,030 ft (1,228 m).

Between Kaltag on the Yukon and Unalakleet on the coast of Norton Sound, there is the Kaltag Portage, a passage through the coastal mountains, which was also used in 1925 for the dog sled relay to Nome caused by a diphtheria epidemic and is now part of the Iditarod Trail Sled Dog Race.
