= Peak 4030 =

Mountain in Alaska, United States

- Location within Alaska

Highest point
- Elevation: 4,030 ft (1,230 m)
- Prominence: 3,333 ft (1,016 m)
- Isolation: 128.44 mi (206.70 km)
- Coordinates: 64°27′13″N 159°24′55″W

Geography
- Location: Yukon–Koyukuk Census Area; Alaska, United States
- Parent range: Nulato Hills

Peak 4030 is a mountain summit, the tallest in the Nulato Hills, in the U.S. state of Alaska. It is located in the Yukon–Koyukuk Census Area.
