= Nopah Peak =

Mountain in California, United States

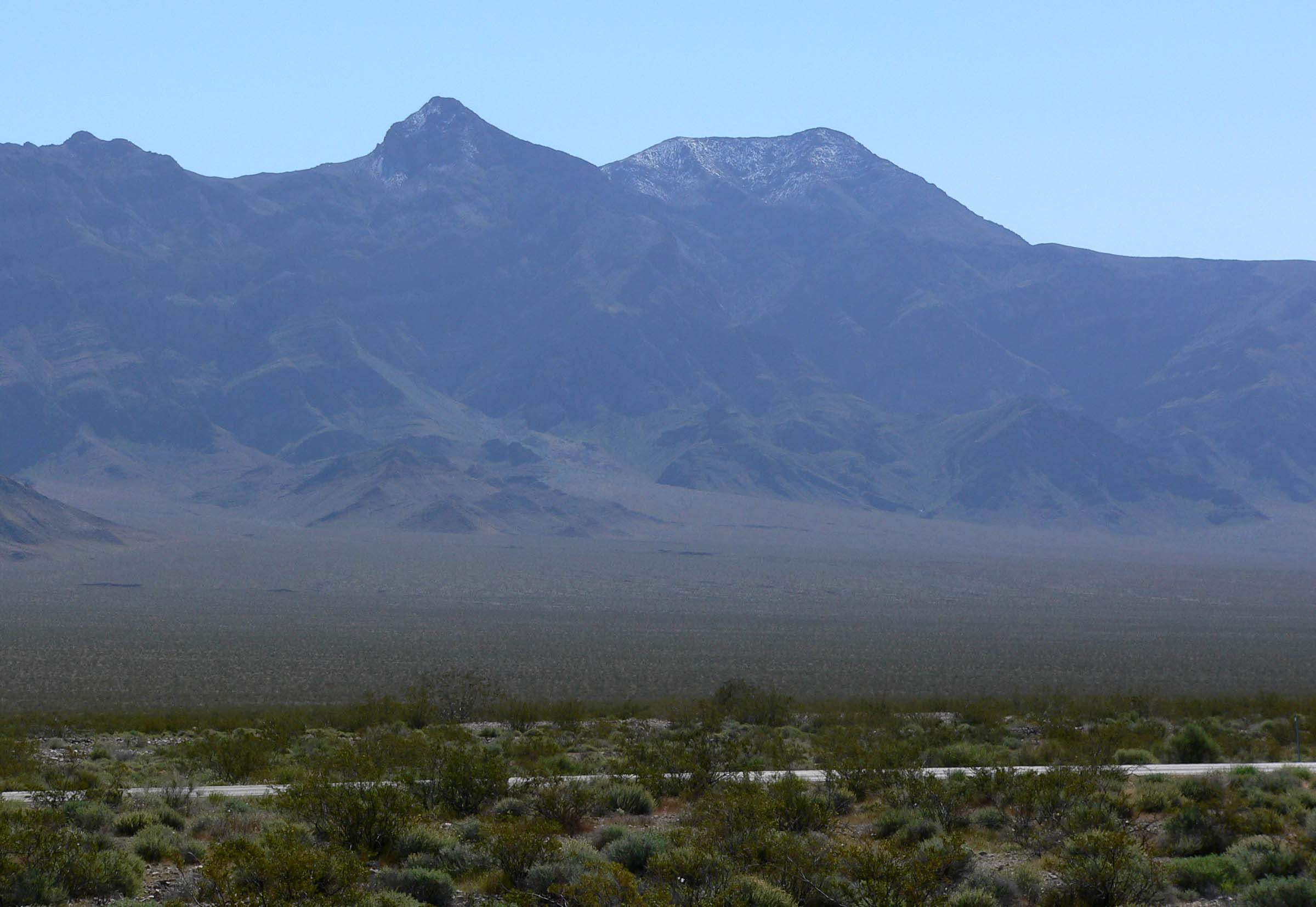
- Nopah Peak (on center-left) viewed from the northwest, rising from the floor of Chicago Valley

Highest point
- Elevation: 6,365 ft (1,940 m)
- Coordinates: 36°01′03″N 116°05′03″W

Geography
- Location within California
- Location: Inyo County, California
- Parent range: Nopah Range
- Topo map: USGS Nopah Peak

Nopah Peak is the highest named mountain in the Nopah Range, a mountain range in Inyo County, California, in the Mojave Desert just west of the state border with Nevada. The peak has an elevation of 6,365 feet (1,940 metres) and a topographic prominence of 628 feet (191 m). It boasts steep escarpments to both east and west, rising more than 3,000 feet (914 m) in approximately 0.75 miles from the desert floor of Chicago Valley to the west and a drop-off almost as steep to the east.

While Nopah Peak is the highest named peak in the Nopah Range, the true high point of the range is a point approximately nine feet (three m) higher and less than one mile (two km) south of Nopah Peak. This Nopah Range high point often sees more peak-bagger traffic and attention than Nopah Peak itself, because of its prominence: at 3,565 feet (1,087 metres), it is the 27th most-prominent summit in California, and thus included on the Sierra Club Desert Peaks Section (DPS), a list of noteworthy desert peaks.

Nopah Peak and most of the Nopah Range lie within the Nopah Range Wilderness, administered by the Bureau of Land Management (BLM). They also form part of the Basin and Range Province, along with neighboring mountains and ranges, such as the Resting Spring Range to the northwest on the other side of Chicago Valley, and the Kingston Range to the southeast.

== Naming ==
The origin of the name "Nopah" is not entirely clear. It may be taken from pah, a generic Shoshoni word for water which appears in names elsewhere in the Great Basin region (such as Tonopah and Ivanpah). Gustav Gudde suggests in his California Place Names that the name may have been a hybrid name created by surveyors to indicate no water was to be found there (Nopah → No pah).

== See also ==
- List of mountain peaks of California
- Old Spanish Trail (trade route)
- Emigrant Pass
