= Kingston Peak (California) =

Mountain in California, United States

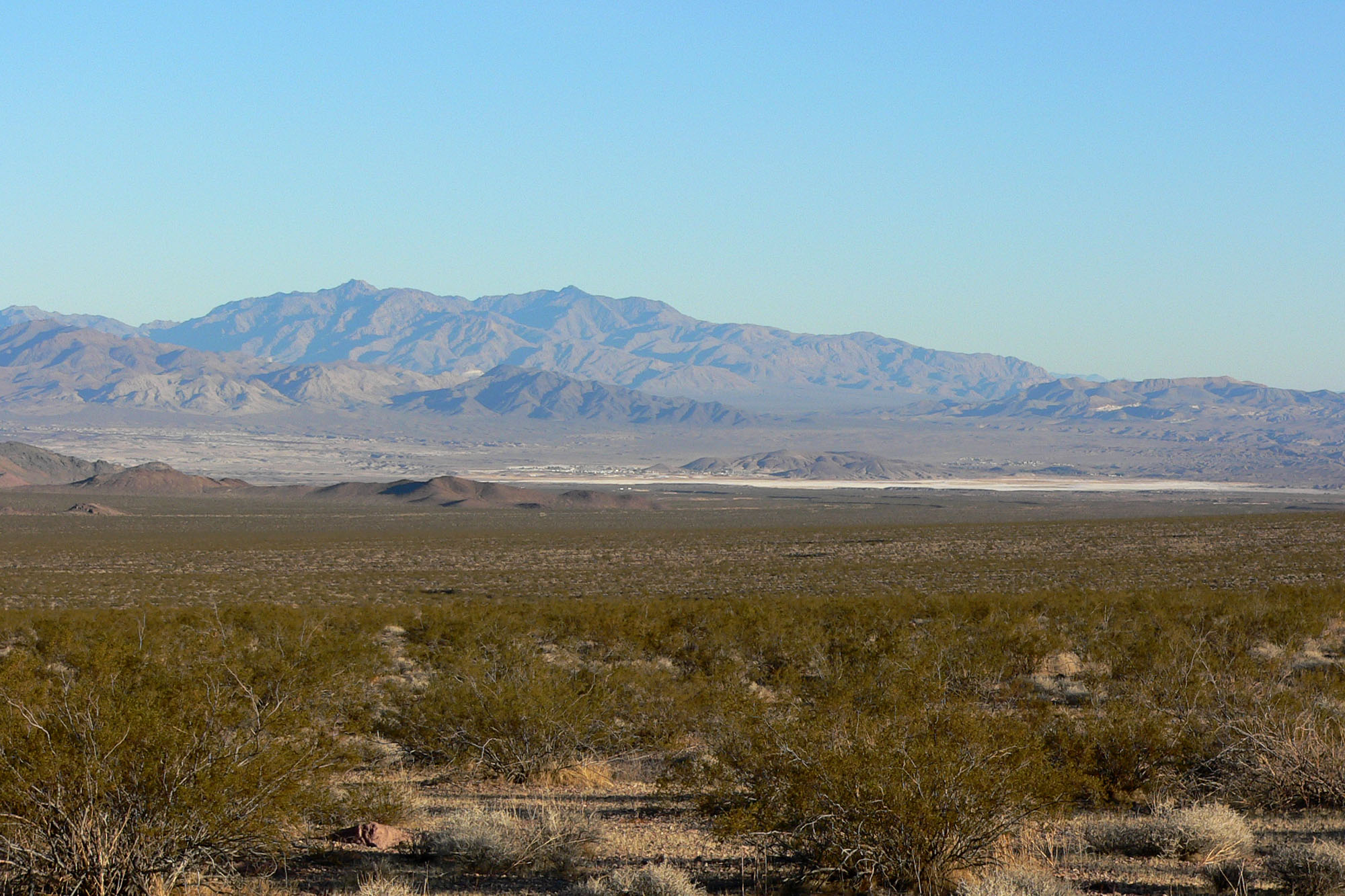
- Kingston Peak (center) seen from 22 miles to the northwest in Greenwater Valley

Highest point
- Elevation: 7,326 ft (2,233 m)
- Coordinates: 35°43′36″N 115°54′56″W

Geography
- Location within California
- Location: San Bernardino, California
- Parent range: Kingston Range
- Topo map: USGS Kingston Peak

Kingston Peak is the only named peak in the Kingston Range, a small desert mountain range in San Bernardino County, California, in the Mojave Desert. The highest point in the Kingston Range's 17-mile U-shaped continuous ridgeline, the peak has an elevation of 7,326 feet (2,233 metres) and a topographic prominence of 3,727 ft (1,136 m). Kingston Peak's prominence makes it among the top 200 mountains by prominence in the contiguous United States, and the 23rd most prominent peak in California.

Kingston Peak and the Kingston Range lie within the Kingston Range Wilderness, administered by the Bureau of Land Management (BLM) and one of California's most botanically diverse desert regions. One of only three white fir stands in the California deserts is found on the slopes of two drainages just below the summit of Kingston Peak.

Kingston Peak and Range also form part of the Basin and Range Province, along with neighboring mountains and ranges, such as the Mesquite Mountains to the east, and the Nopah Range to the northwest.

== Naming ==
The origin of the name Kingston as applied to Kingston Peak and Range is unknown. It dates back at least to the early 1860s and possibly earlier. One account says it was applied by a member of John C. Frémont's second expedition into the American West, after the settlement of Kingston, New York.

== See also ==
- Shadow Mountains
- Tecopa, California
