= Chicago Valley =

Valley in Inyo County, California, US

- Location within California
- Floor elevation: 618 m (2,028 ft)
- Length: 17 m (56 ft) North to South
- Width: 6 m (20 ft)

Geography
- Location: California
- Coordinates: 35°51′38″N 116°08′00″W
- Topo map: Tecopa, Resting Spring, North of Tecopa Pass, Twelvemile Spring
- Interactive map of Chicago Valley

Chicago Valley is a valley in Inyo County, California. The head of Chicago Valley lies at 36°07′25″N 116°10′39″W and runs south to its mouth that lies at an elevation of 2,028 feet / 618 meters in the vicinity of Resting Springs where it meets the Greenwater Valley. The Chicago Valley lies between the Resting Spring Range on the west and the Nopah Range on the east and north.
