= Mesquite Mountains =

Mountain range in California, United States

- Location within California

Highest point
- Elevation: 1,321 m (4,334 ft)

Geography
- Country: United States
- State: California
- District: San Bernardino County
- Range coordinates: 35°43′9.913″N 115°42′37.025″W
- Topo map: USGS Mesquite Mountains

The Mesquite Mountains are a mountain range in eastern San Bernardino County, California, near the border with Nevada. They are north of Interstate 15 in California and southeast of Death Valley.

== Wilderness ==
Established in 1994 by the U.S. Congress, the Mesquite Wilderness and the North Mesquite Mountains Wilderness are managed by the U.S. Bureau of Land Management and divided by Kingston Road. The 28,955 acre North Mesquite Mountains Wilderness is in the northwestern section of the range and includes the broad western end of Sandy Valley. Rolling brown foothills, a few steeper mountains, and medium-sized buttes comprise the reddish-brown geologic features in the wilderness. The Kingston Range Wilderness is to the west. The 44,804 acre Mesquite Wilderness includes the southeastern part of the range and is bordered by the Stateline Wilderness to the east.

== Flora and fauna ==
Vegetation of this area is characteristic of the mid-elevations of the eastern Mojave Desert. Dominant vegetation includes creosote brush scrub, blackbush scrub, Joshua tree woodland, yucca, cacti, and some grasses.

Wildlife is also typical for the Mojave Desert; including coyote, black-tailed jackrabbits, ground squirrels, kangaroo rats, quail, roadrunners, rattlesnakes and several species of lizards. The southern tip of the wilderness provides critical habitat for the desert tortoise.

== See also ==
- Category: Mountain ranges of the Mojave Desert
- Category: Protected areas of the Mojave Desert
- Category: Flora of the California desert regions
