= Resting Spring Range =

Protected wilderness area in California, United States

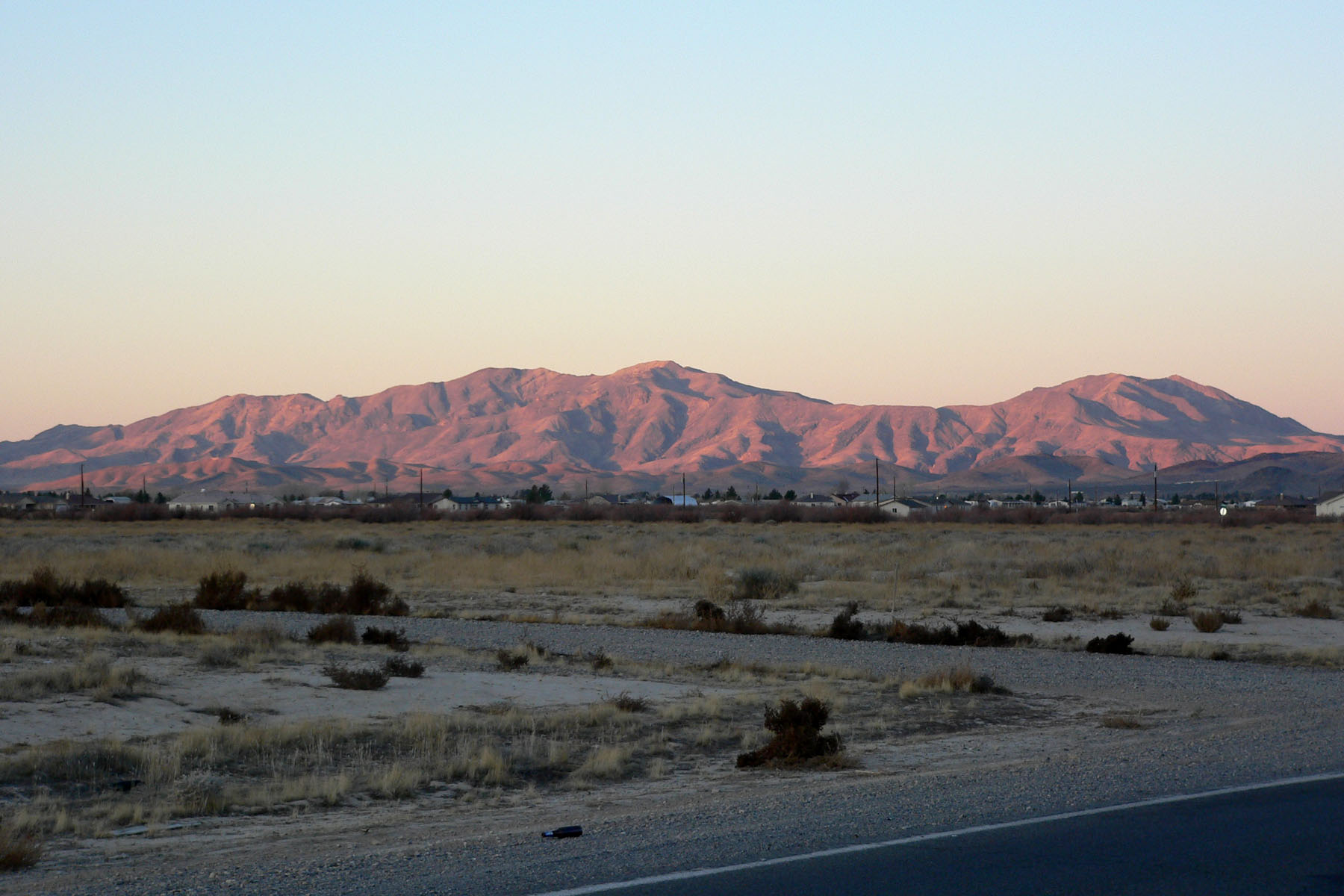
- The Resting Spring Range as viewed from Pahrump, Nevada

Highest point
- Peak: 13667
- Coordinates: 36°04′38″N 116°13′57″W

Geography
- Location within California
- Country: United States
- State: California
- District: Inyo County
- Range coordinates: 36°05′00″N 116°14′03″W
- Topo map: USGS Twelvemile Spring

The Resting Spring Range is found in the eastern Mojave Desert of California near the Nevada state line in the United States. The range lies in a generally north–south direction to the west of the Nopah Range and southeast of the Amargosa Range and Greenwater Range.

The mountains in Inyo County, California, lie between the Amargosa River and California State Route 127 to the west and Stewart and Chicago valleys and California State Route 178 to the east.

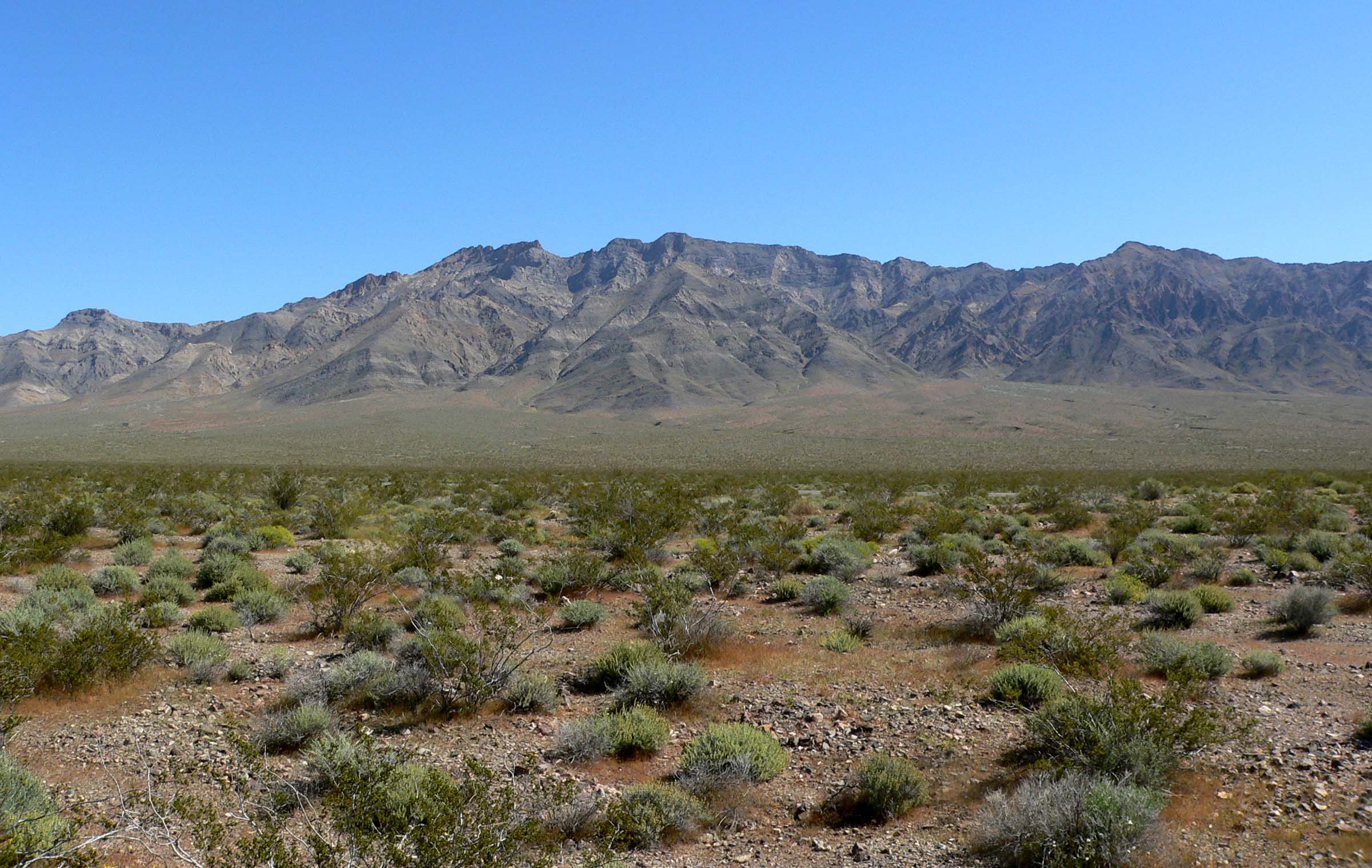
The Resting Spring Range can be viewed from Chicago Valley in the Mojave Desert.

== Wilderness ==
Established in 1994 by the U.S. Congress, the Resting Spring Range Wilderness protects the range between Death Valley National Park and the Nevada state line as part of the National Wilderness Preservation System. The 76,312 acre desert wilderness area is managed by the Bureau of Land Management and ranges in elevation from 2,040 feet (621 m) to 5,264 feet (1604 m) on Stewart's Peak. The Nopah Range Wilderness lies to the south and the Death Valley Wilderness to the west.
