= Nopah Range =

Mountain range in Inyo County, California

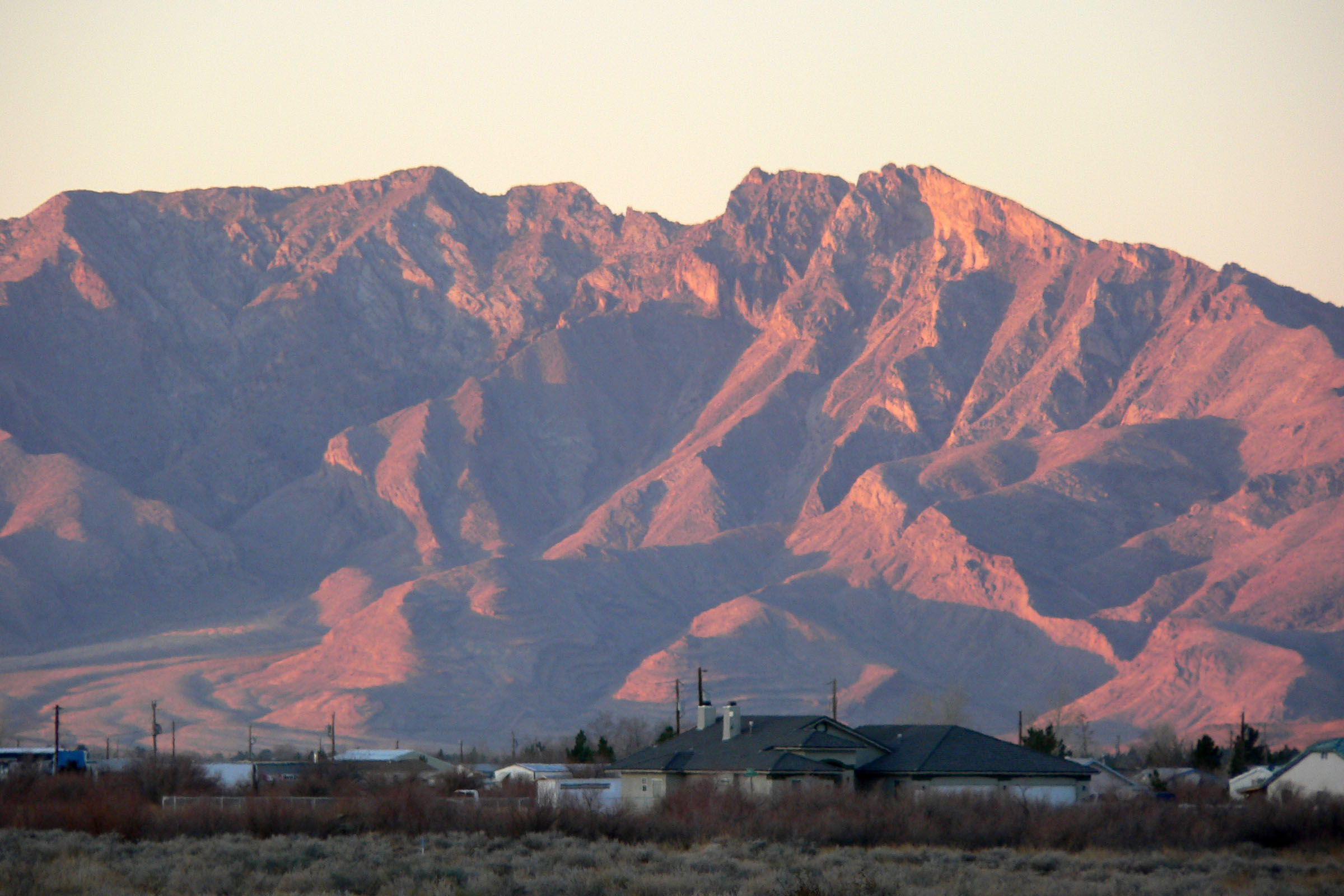
- The eastern escarpment of the northern Nopah Range, viewed from near Pahrump, Nevada

Highest point
- Elevation: 1,941 m (6,368 ft)

Geography
- Location within California
- Country: United States
- State: California
- District: Inyo County
- Range coordinates: 36°0′21.873″N 116°4′49.084″W
- Topo map: USGS Nopah Peak

The Nopah Range is a mountain range located in Inyo County, California, United States, near the eastern border with Nevada.

== Geography ==
The mountain range lies east of the adjacent Resting Spring Range, the Owlshead Mountains and lower Death Valley, and are north of the Kingston Range. The Amargosa River is to the west. They are located directly east of Shoshone, California, and the Chicago Valley, northeast of Tecopa, California, southwest of Pahrump, Nevada, and west of Las Vegas, Nevada.

The Nopah Range reaches an elevation of 6,395 feet above sea level at Nopah Peak, in the center of the range. The Nopah Range is approximately 26 miles long.

== Wilderness ==
The Nopah Range Wilderness consists of 106,623 acres of the mountain range. Established in 1994 by the U.S. Congress, the wilderness area is managed by the U.S. Bureau of Land Management. Elevations range from 1,800 feet (548 m) to 6,395 feet (1949 m). The South Nopah Range Wilderness includes 17,059 acres of lower elevation foothills of the range.

== Gallery ==
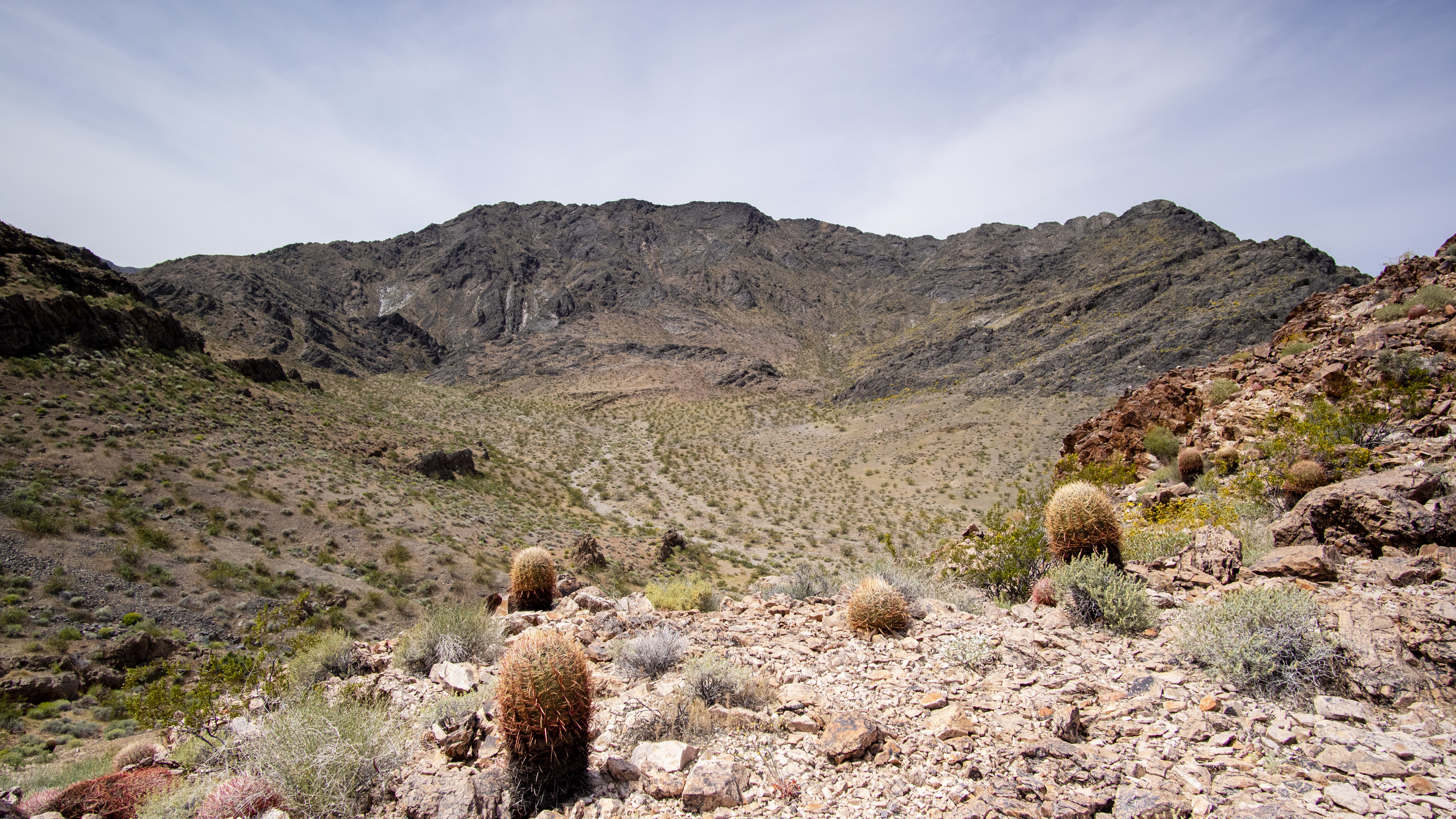
Looking south into the South Nopah Range Wilderness Area, Inyo County, California (2017)

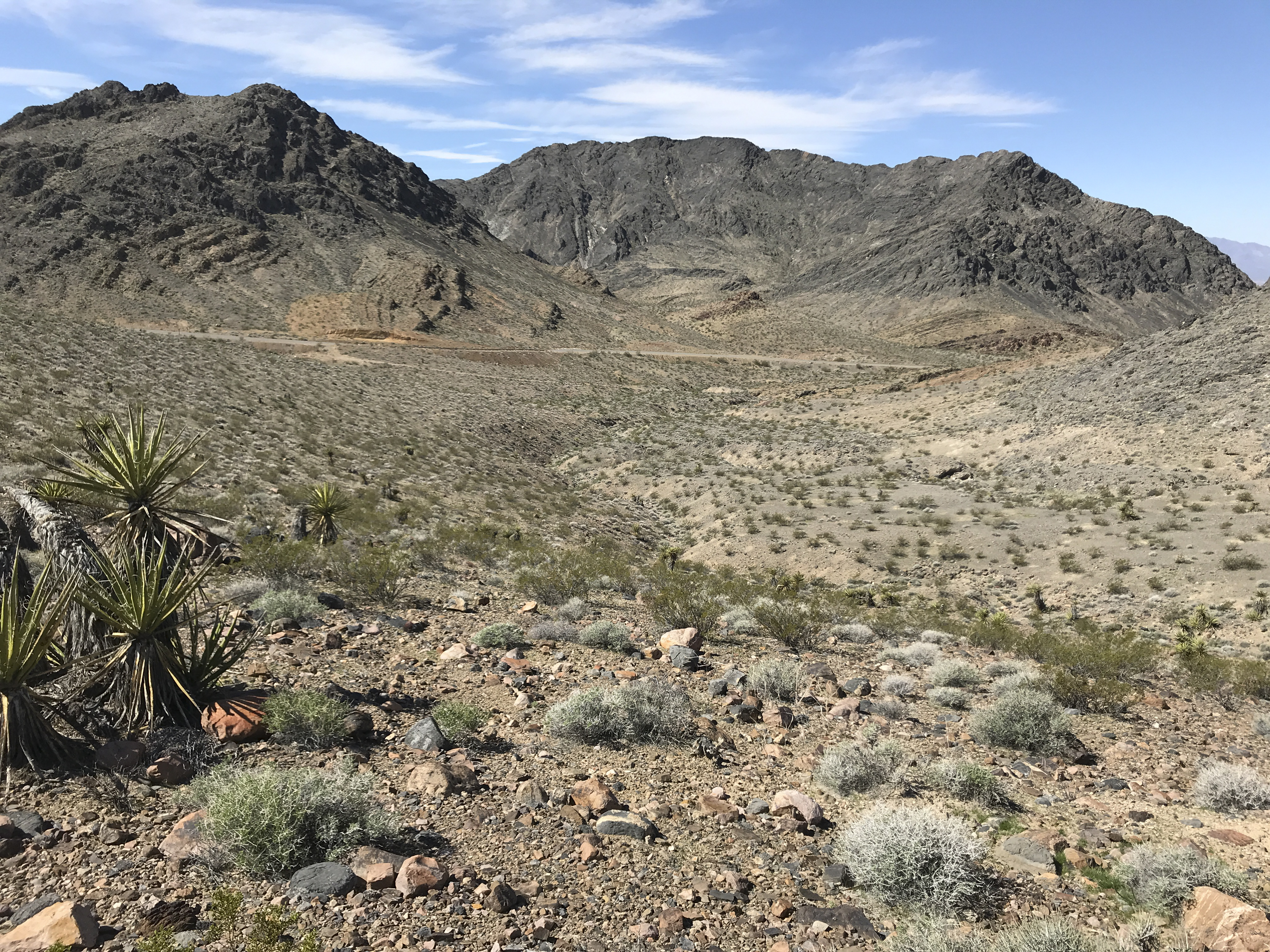
Looking at the Nopah Range Wilderness Area from about one mile north of the roadway (2019)

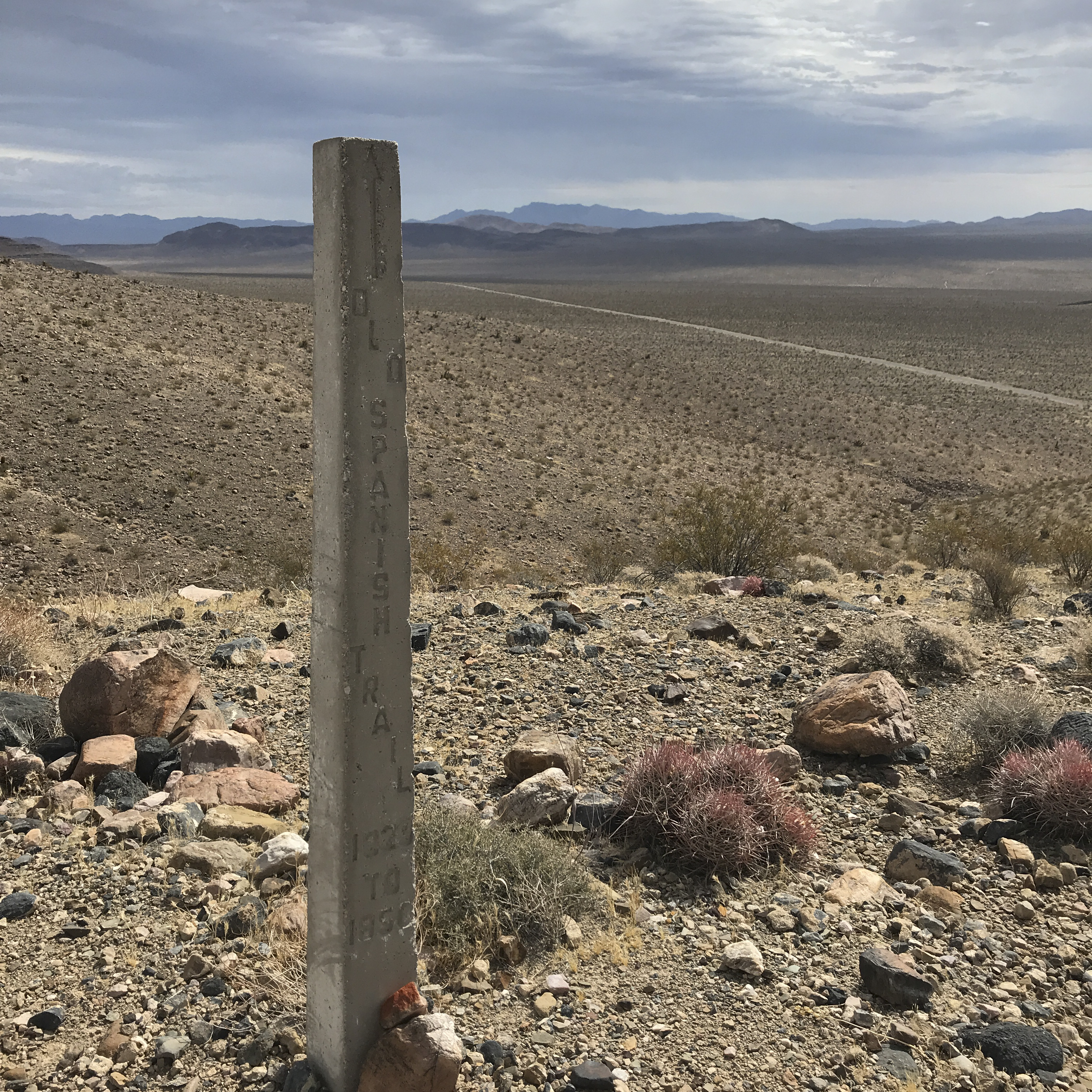
These granite markers appear here and there to mark what used to be the Old Spanish Trail (2019)

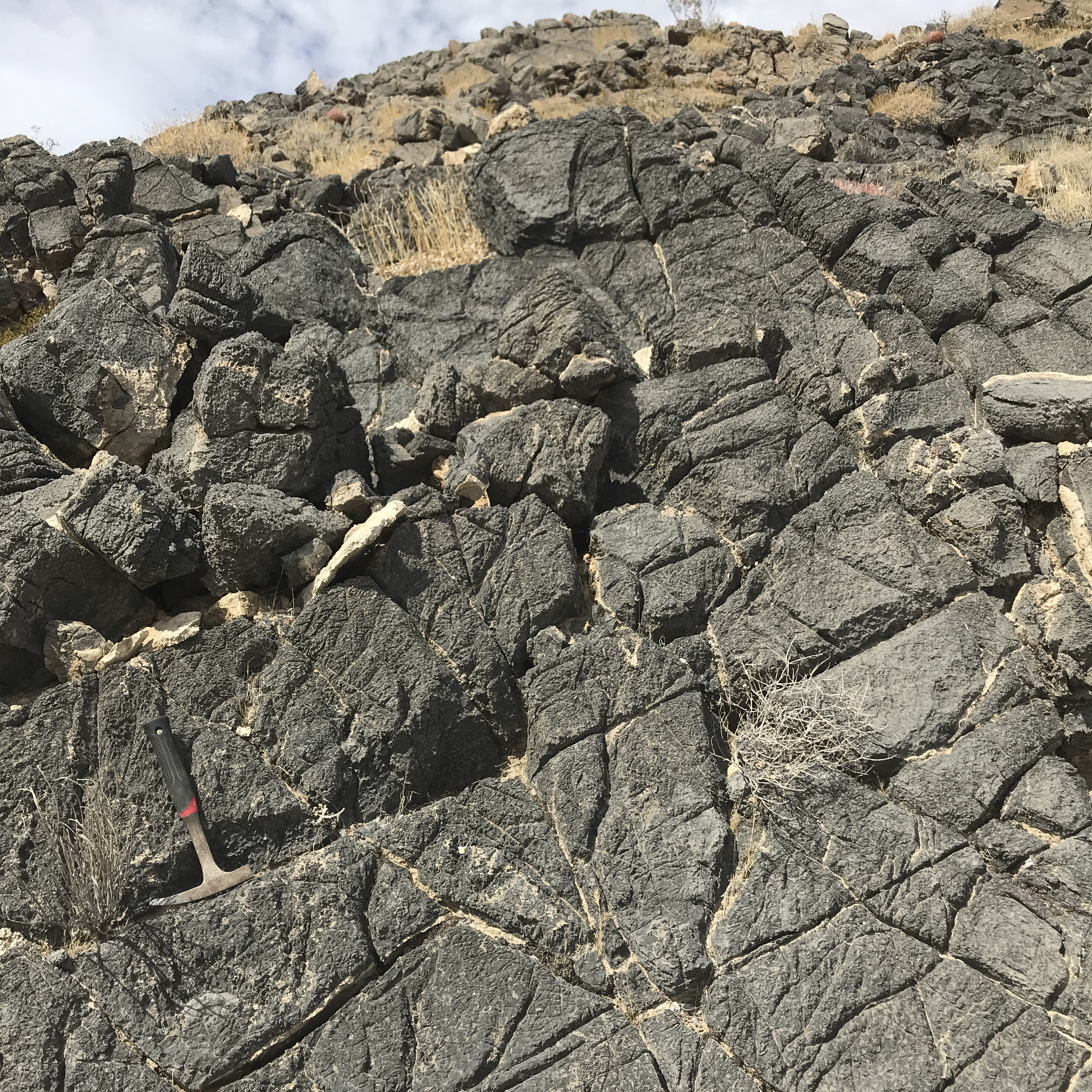
These craggy looking cliffs might appear to be volcanic but they are actually weathered limestone (2019)

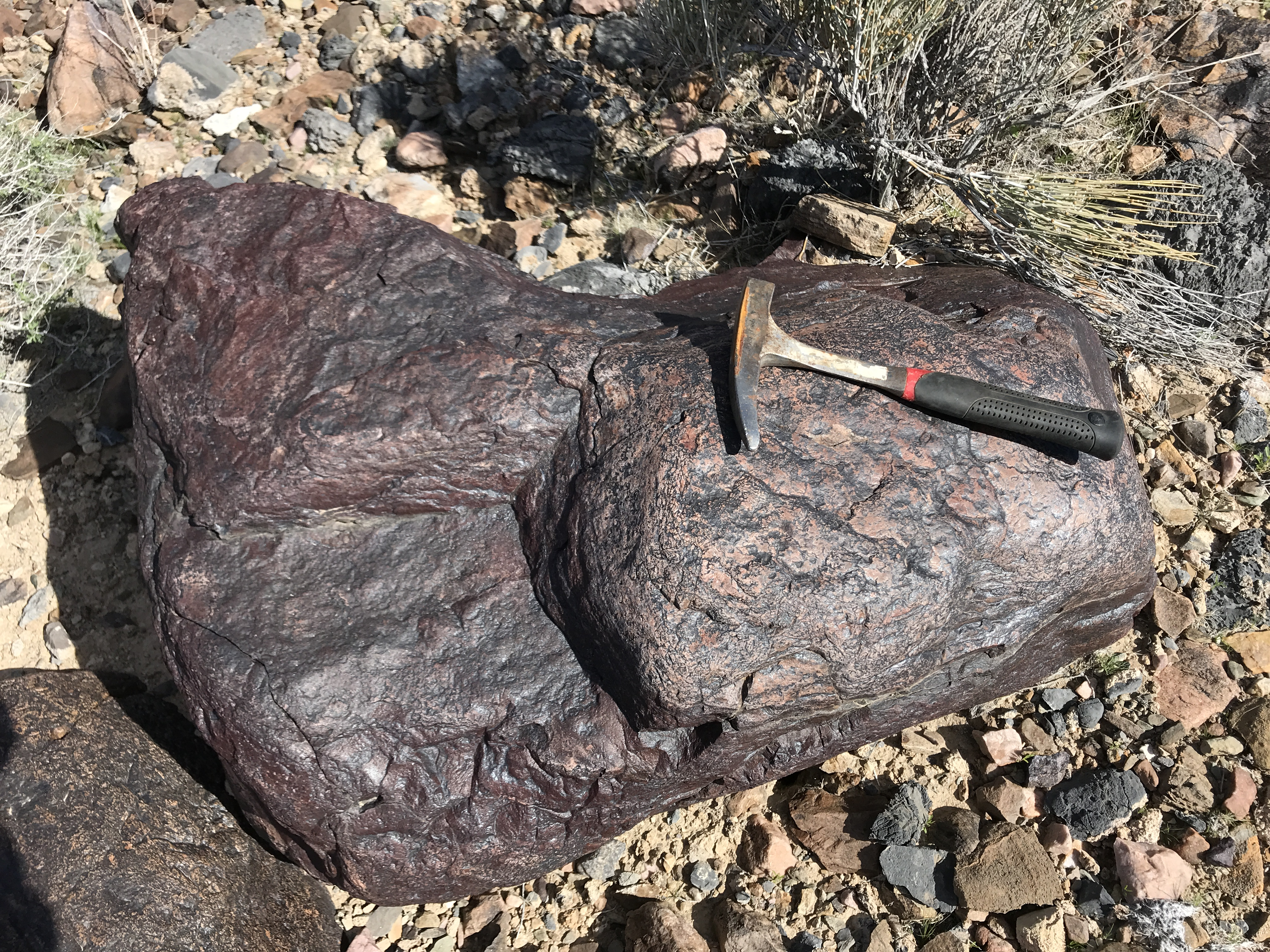
Red quartzite boulders at a location north of Emigrant Pass (2019)

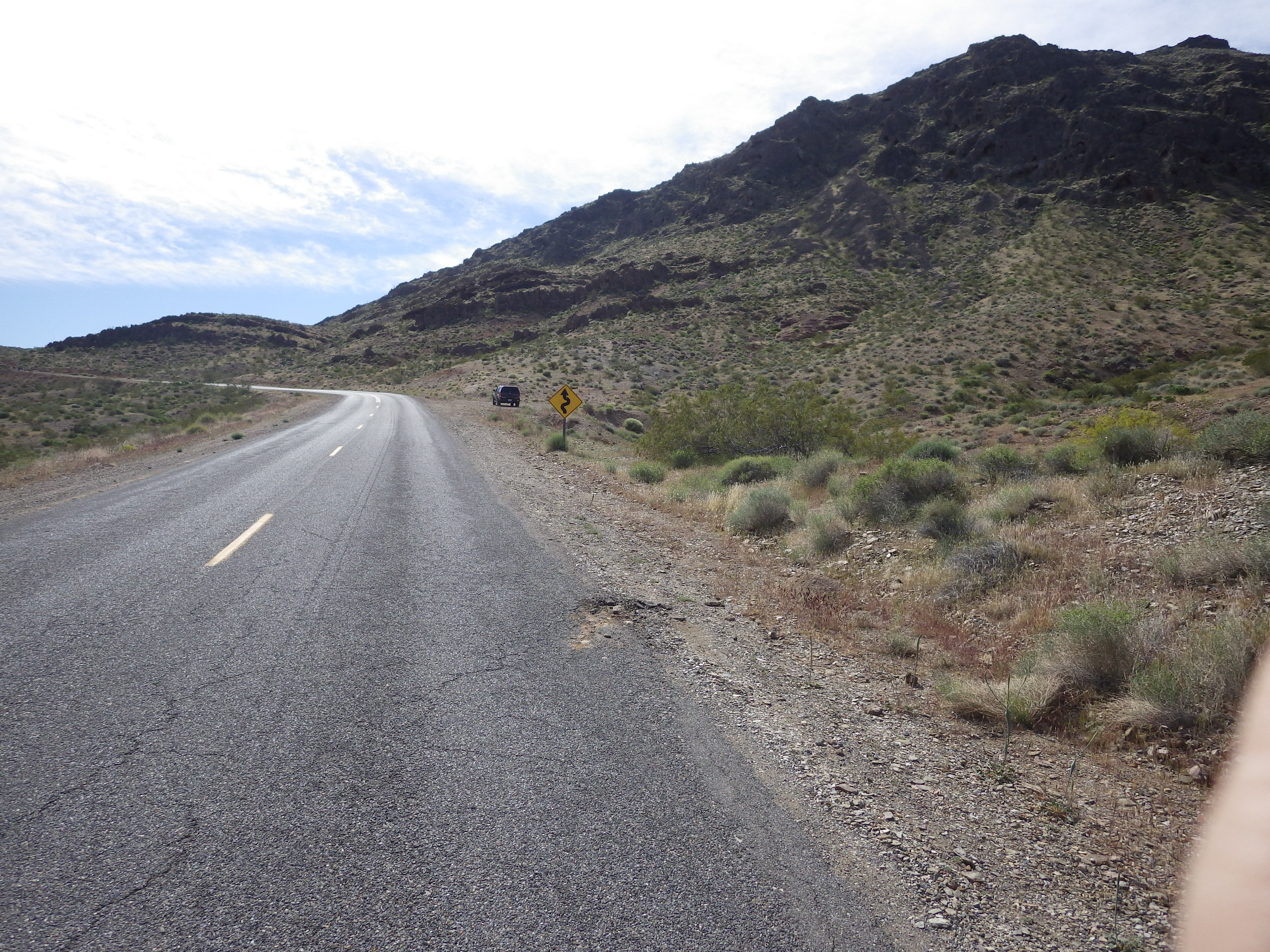
This road cut near Emigrant Pass has been hunted for decades for trilobites (2017)

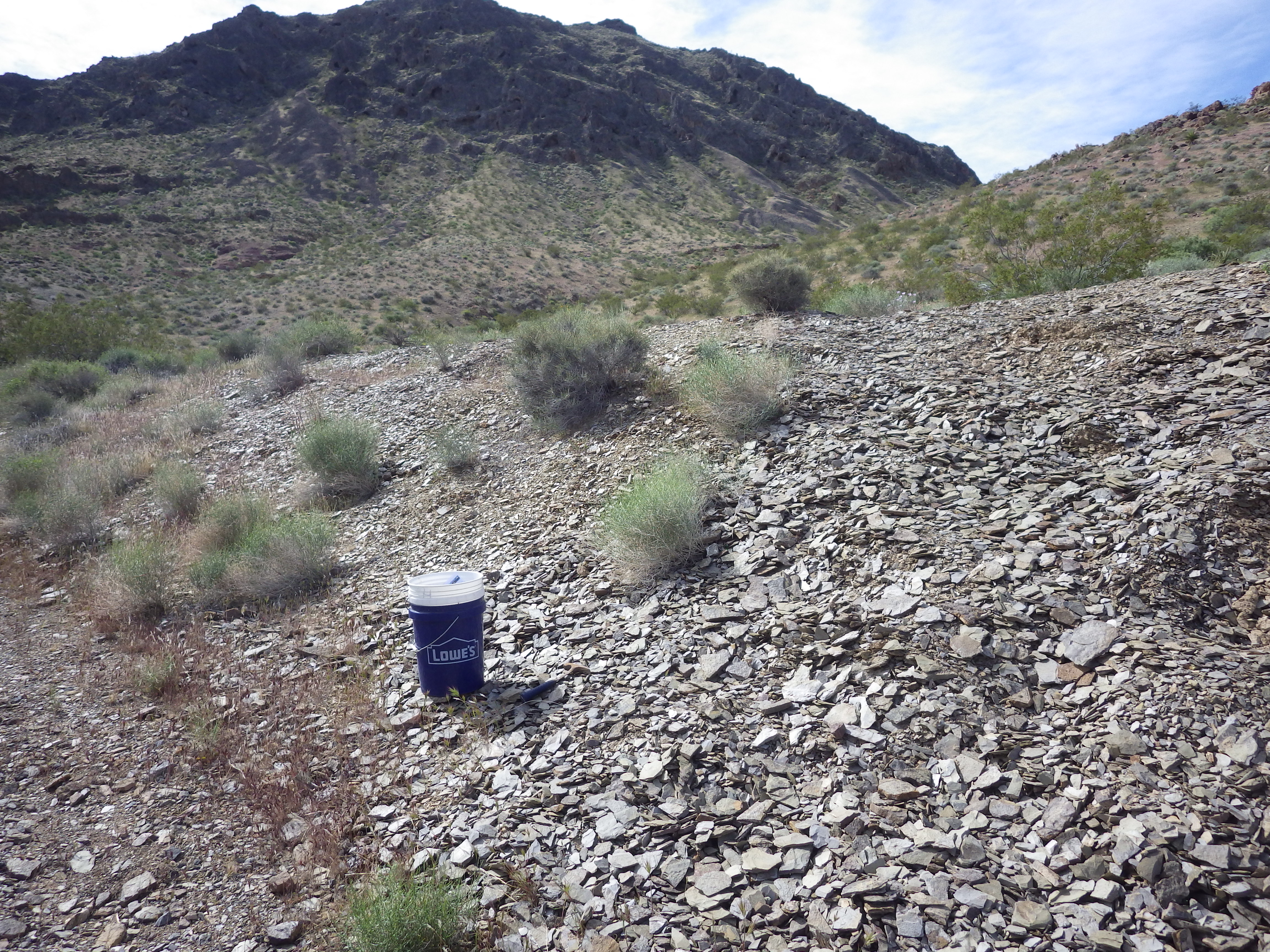
Trilobite hunting area next to the roadway has good access and easy parking (2017)

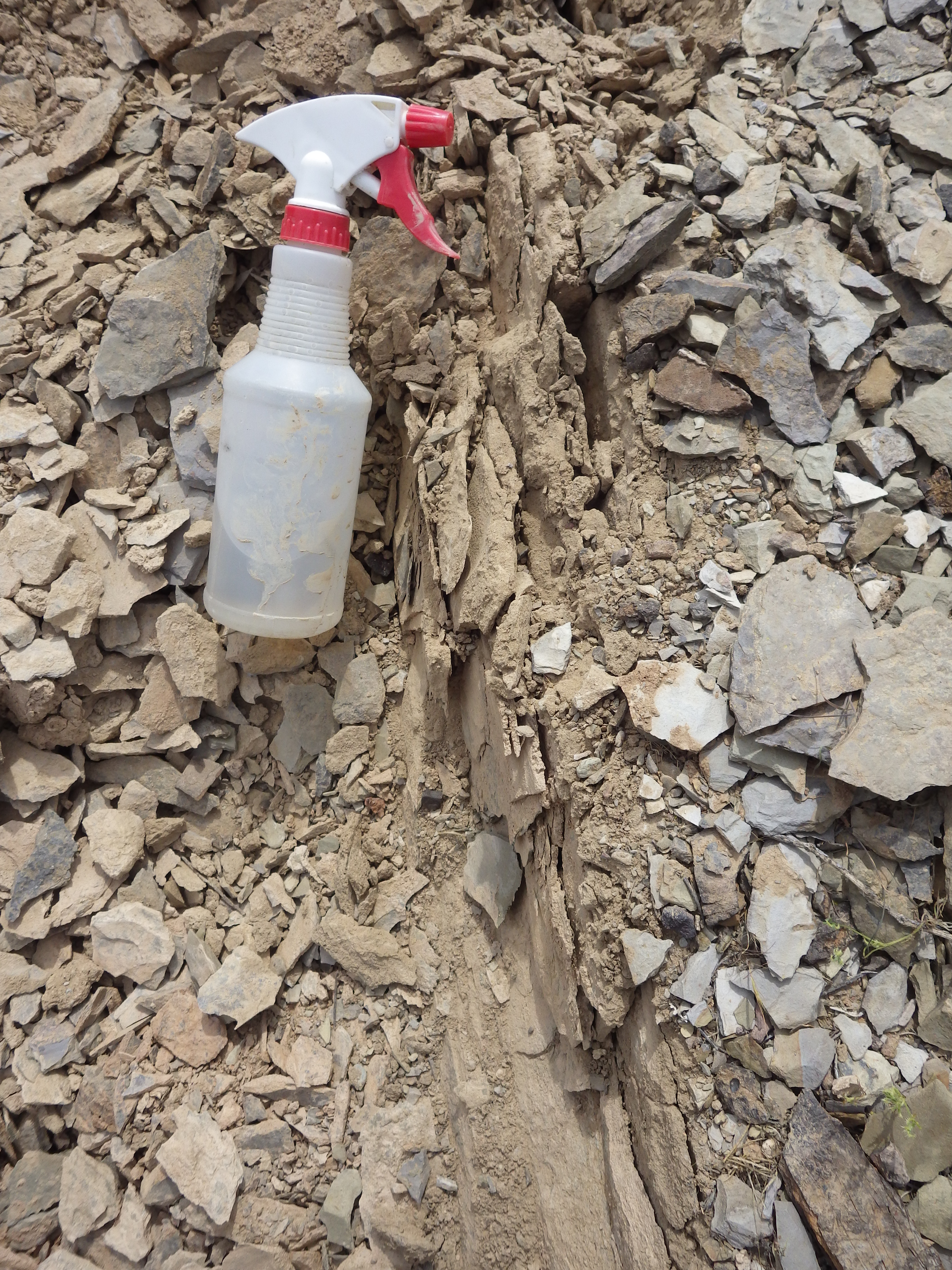
Misting or water bottle needed to reveal partial trilobites (2017)

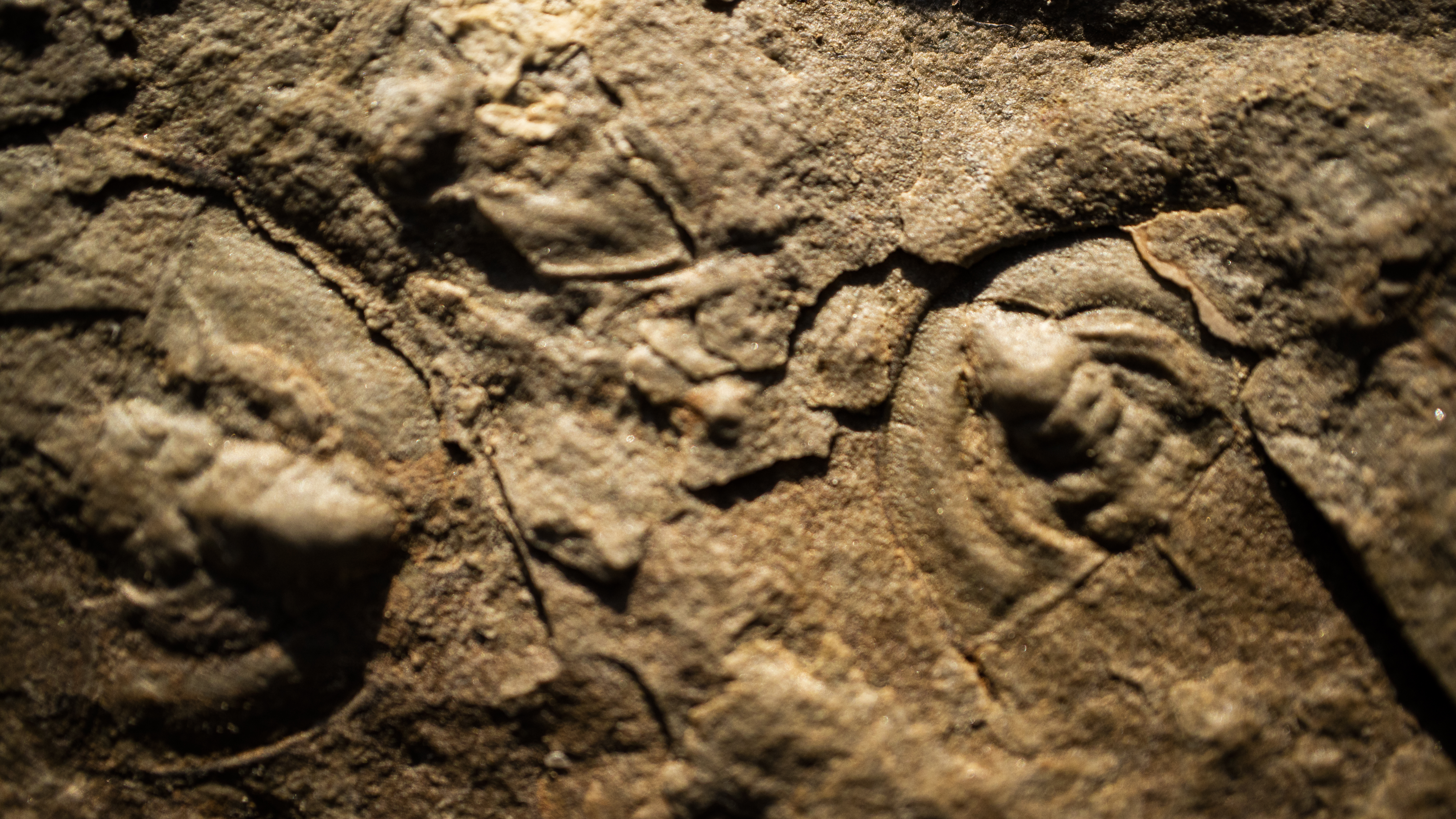
This site provides mostly partial trilobites (2017)

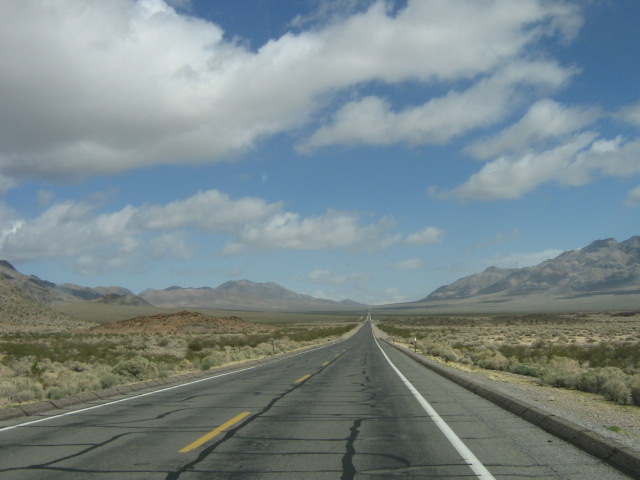
Nopah Range, near California State Route 127

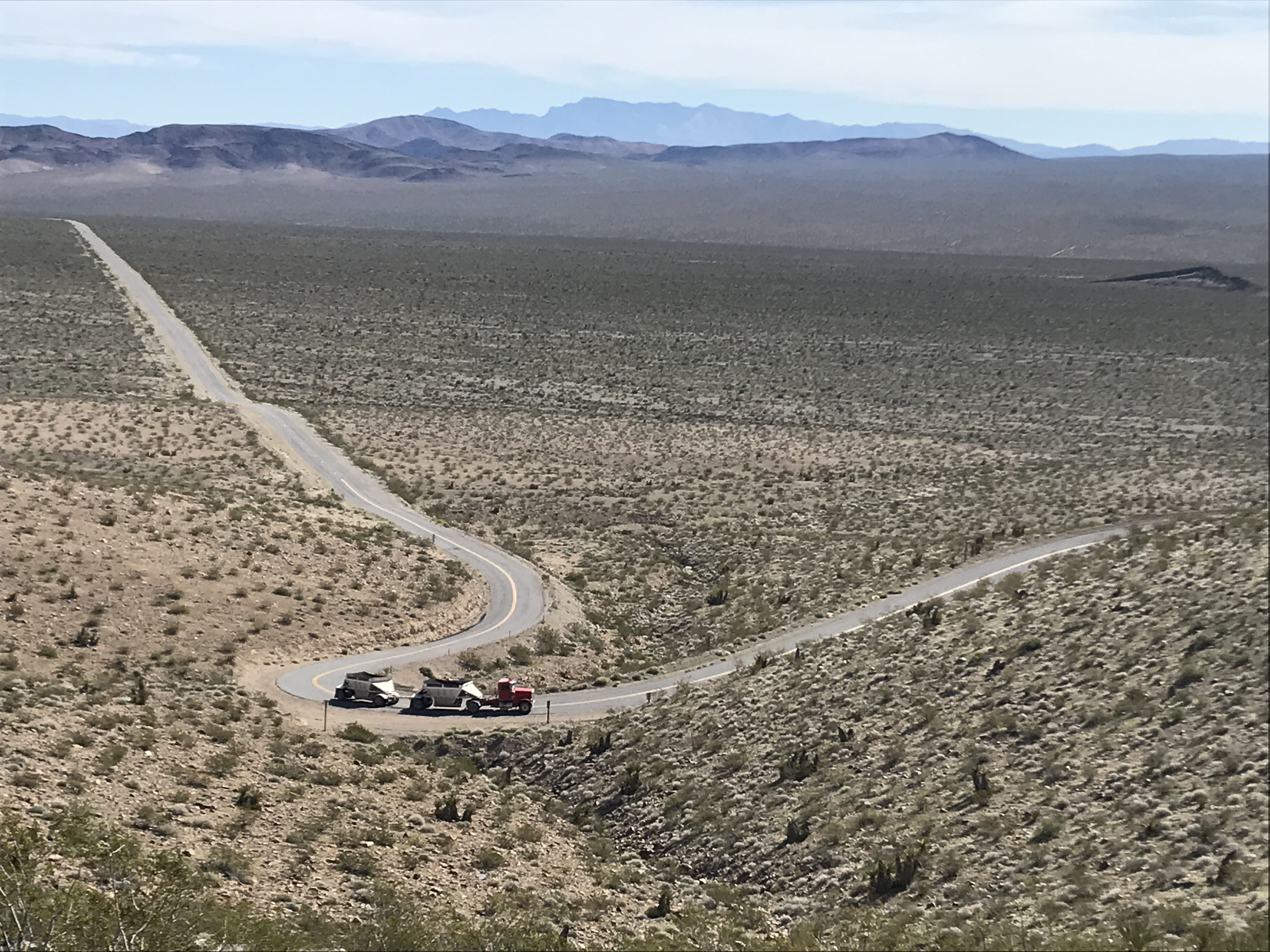
A gravel hauler works the grade up to the top of Emigrant Pass in the Nopah Range

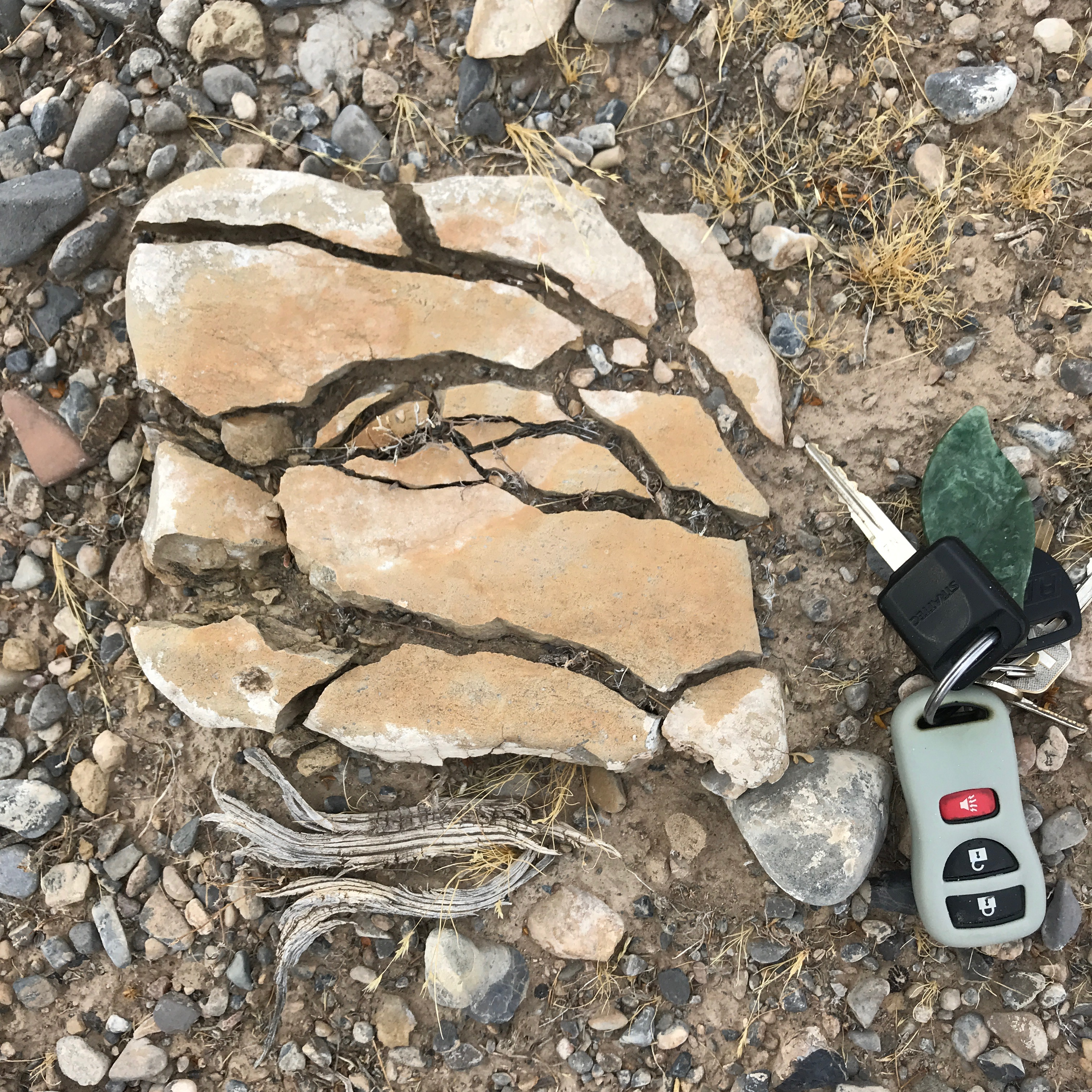
Fractured sandstone in the North Nopah Wilderness Area

== See also ==
- Category: Mountain ranges of the Mojave Desert
- Kingston Peak
