= Kingston Range =

Mountain range in Mojave Desert in California

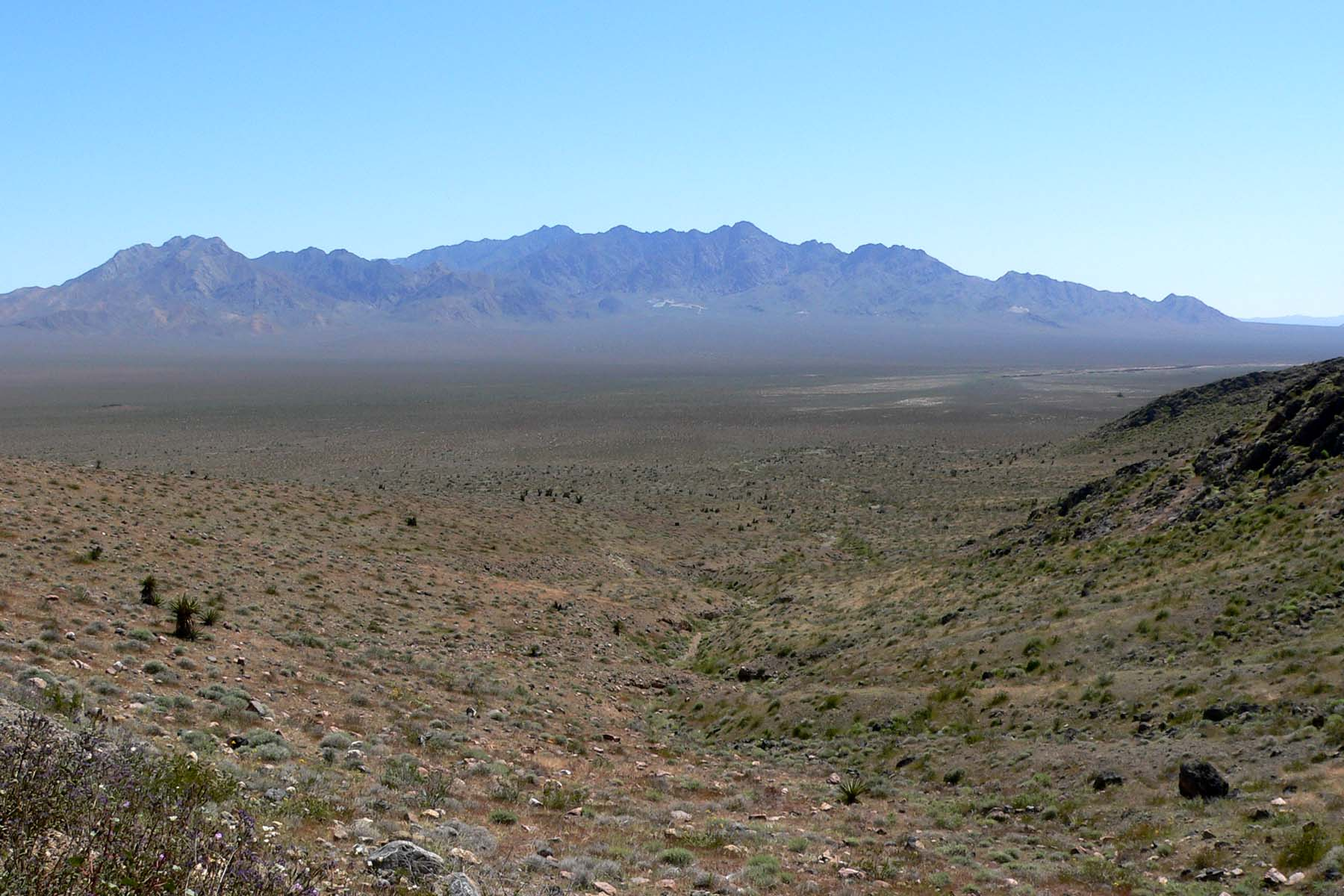
- Kingston Range, Mojave Desert

Highest point
- Peak: Kingston Peak
- Elevation: 7,323 ft (2,232 m)

Geography
- Location within California
- Country: United States
- State: California
- Region: Mojave Desert
- District: San Bernardino County
- Range coordinates: 35°47′2.900″N 115°54′7.049″W
- Topo map: USGS Horse Thief Springs

The Kingston Range, sometimes called the Kingston Mountains, is located in Inyo and San Bernardino counties in the Mojave Desert in eastern California. The range reaches a height of 7,323 feet (2,232 m) above sea level at Kingston Peak.

The range is located southeast of the Nopah Range, and north of the Shadow Mountains and Interstate 15. The former community of Halloran Springs is about 22 miles (35 km) south of the Kingston Range. The range stretches about 18 mi (29 km) in a northeast–southwest direction. Tecopa Pass, at 5,100 ft (1,600 m), is located at the northeastern end of the mountains.

== Wilderness ==
The Kingston Range Wilderness was added to the National Wilderness Preservation System by the U.S. Congress in 1994 and is currently composed of 252,149 acres in three distinct units separated by non-wilderness corridors. This area protects an ecological transition zone between the Great Basin and Mojave Deserts.

The Amargosa unit in the north is centered around Amargosa Canyon and protects a desert wetland habitat that supports a diverse population of migratory birds and aquatic life. The central Kingston unit encompasses the Kingston Mountains themselves, a 17-mile ridgeline that rises to 7,323 on Kingston Peak. The southern Shadow Mountain unit covers the lower elevation Shadow Mountains.

There are 505 native plant species in the wilderness area. From Creosote bush scrub vegetation in the lower elevations to juniper-pinyon woodland at higher elevations, this desert wilderness includes a wealth of botanical biodiversity including the only stand of Giant nolina in the eastern Mojave Desert as well as a relic stand of white fir trees clinging to the slopes of two drainages just below Kingston Peak. Wildlife includes the banded gila monster, bighorn sheep, wild burros, coyote, black-tailed jackrabbits, ground squirrels, kangaroo rats, roadrunners, quail, rattlesnakes, tarantulas, several species of lizards, and the desert tortoise.

== See also ==
Kingston Peak
