= List of the highest major summits of the United States =

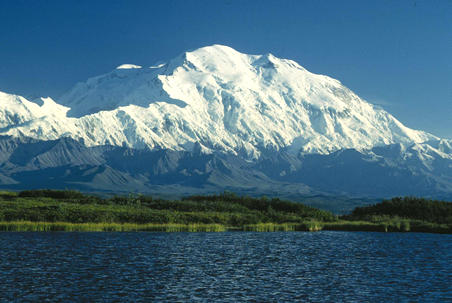
Denali in Alaska is the highest mountain peak in North America. Denali is the third most topographically prominent and third most topographically isolated summit on Earth after Mount Everest and Aconcagua.

The following sortable table comprises the 477 mountain peaks of the United States with at least 3,000 m (9,843 ft) of topographic elevation and at least 500 m (1,640 ft) of topographic prominence.

The summit of a mountain or hill may be measured in three principal ways:

1. The topographic elevation of a summit measures the height of the summit above a geodetic sea level.
2. The topographic prominence of a summit is a measure of how high the summit rises above its surroundings.
3. The topographic isolation (or radius of dominance) of a summit measures how far the summit lies from its nearest point of equal elevation.

In the United States, only Denali exceeds 6000 meters (19,685 feet) elevation. Four major summits exceed 5000 meters (16,404 feet), nine exceed 4500 meters (14,764 feet), 104 exceed 4000 meters (13,123 feet), 246 exceed 3500 meters (11,483 feet), and the following 477 major summits exceed 3000 meters (9843 feet) elevation.

== Major 3000-meter summits ==
A total of 477 mountain summits in the United States meet both criteria for the definition of "major summit" used here: at least 3,000 meters (9,843 ft) of topographic elevation and at least 500 meters (1,640 ft) of topographic prominence. Of these 477 summits, 117 are located in Colorado, 67 in Alaska, 51 in California, 43 in Wyoming, 42 in Montana, 40 in Utah, 38 in Nevada, 36 in Idaho, 26 in New Mexico, five in Arizona, five in Oregon, four in Washington, and three in Hawaiʻi. Five of these summits are located on the international border between Alaska and the Yukon, and three are located on the international border between Alaska and British Columbia. The ten highest major summits of the United States are all located in Alaska.

The northernmost summit with at least 3000 metres elevation and 500 metres prominence is Hess Mountain in central Alaska; the southernmost is Mauna Loa on the Island of Hawaii; the westernmost is Haleakalā on the Island of Maui; and the easternmost is East Spanish Peak in south-central Colorado. In the contiguous United States (i.e. excluding Alaska and Hawaii), the northernmost, southernmost, westernmost, and easternmost major summits are Kintla Peak in Montana, Mount Graham in Arizona, Mount Shasta in California, and East Spanish Peak in Colorado.

The 477 summits of the United States with at least 3,000 meters (9,800 feet) of topographic elevation and 500 meters (1,600 feet) of topographic prominence
Rank	Mountain Peak	State	Mountain Range	Elevation	Prominence	Isolation	Location
1	Denali (Note: The summit of Denali is the highest point of the Alaska Range, the State of Alaska, the United States of America, and greater North America. Denali is the third most topographically prominent and third most topographically isolated summit on Earth after Mount Everest and Aconcagua.) (Mount McKinley)	Alaska	Alaska Range	20,310 ft 6190.5 m	20,146 ft 6141 m	4,629 mi 7,450 km	63.0690°N 151.0063°W
2	Mount Saint Elias (Note: Mount Saint Elias is the second-highest major summit of both Canada and the United States.)	Alaska; Yukon	Saint Elias Mountains	18,009 ft 5489 m	11,250 ft 3429 m	25.6 mi 41.3 km	60.2927°N 140.9307°W
3	Mount Foraker (Note: Mount Foraker is the westernmost 5000-meter (16,404-foot) summit of Alaska, the United States, and greater North America.)	Alaska	Alaska Range	17,400 ft 5304 m	7,250 ft 2210 m	14.27 mi 23 km	62.9604°N 151.3998°W
4	Mount Bona (Note: The summit of Mount Bona is the highest point of the northwest Saint Elias Mountains.)	Alaska	Saint Elias Mountains	16,550 ft 5044 m	6,900 ft 2103 m	49.7 mi 80 km	61.3856°N 141.7495°W
5	Mount Blackburn (Note: The summit of Mount Blackburn is the highest point of the Wrangell Mountains.)	Alaska	Wrangell Mountains	16,390 ft 4996 m	11,640 ft 3548 m	60.7 mi 97.6 km	61.7305°N 143.4031°W
6	Mount Sanford	Alaska	Wrangell Mountains	16,237 ft 4949 m	7,687 ft 2343 m	40.3 mi 64.8 km	62.2132°N 144.1292°W
7	Mount Fairweather (Note: Mount Fairweather lies on the international border between Alaska and British Columbia. The peak is the highest point of the Canadian Province of British Columbia and the southernmost and easternmost summit of its elevation in both Canada and the United States.) (Fairweather Mountain)	Alaska; British Columbia	Saint Elias Mountains	15,325 ft 4671 m	12,995 ft 3961 m	124.4 mi 200 km	58.9064°N 137.5265°W
8	Mount Hubbard	Alaska; Yukon	Saint Elias Mountains	14,951 ft 4557 m	8,061 ft 2457 m	21.3 mi 34.4 km	60.3194°N 139.0726°W
9	Mount Bear	Alaska	Saint Elias Mountains	14,831 ft 4520 m	5,054 ft 1540 m	20.1 mi 32.4 km	61.2834°N 141.1433°W
10	Mount Hunter	Alaska	Alaska Range	14,573 ft 4442 m	4,653 ft 1418 m	6.88 mi 11.07 km	62.9504°N 151.0915°W
11	Mount Whitney (Note: The summit of Mount Whitney is the highest point of the Sierra Nevada, the State of California, and the contiguous United States.) (Note: Mount Whitney is the southernmost and easternmost summit of its elevation in the United States.)	California	Sierra Nevada	14,505 ft 4421 m	10,080 ft 3072 m	1,646 mi 2,649 km	36.5786°N 118.2920°W
12	Mount Alverstone (Boundary Point 180)	Alaska; Yukon	Saint Elias Mountains	14,500 ft 4420 m	1,950 ft 594 m	2.25 mi 3.62 km	60.3518°N 139.0749°W
13	University Peak	Alaska	Saint Elias Mountains	14,470 ft 4410 m	3,210 ft 978 m	3.71 mi 5.97 km	61.3272°N 141.7867°W
14	Mount Elbert (Note: The summit of Mount Elbert is the highest point of the U.S. State of Colorado, the Rocky Mountains of North America, and the entire Mississippi River drainage basin.)	Colorado	Sawatch Range	14,440 ft 4401.2 m	9,093 ft 2772 m	671 mi 1,079 km	39.1178°N 106.4454°W
15	Mount Massive (Note: Mount Massive is the second highest major summit of the Rocky Mountains.) (Note: The elevation of Mount Massive includes an adjustment of +2.087 m (6.85 ft) from NGVD 29 to NAVD 88.)	Colorado	Sawatch Range	14,428 ft 4398 m	1,961 ft 598 m	5.06 mi 8.14 km	39.1875°N 106.4757°W
16	Mount Harvard (Note: The summit of Mount Harvard is the highest point of the Collegiate Peaks.) (Note: Mount Harvard is the southernmost and easternmost summit of its elevation in the Rocky Mountains.)	Colorado	Sawatch Range	14,421 ft 4395.6 m	2,360 ft 719 m	14.92 mi 24 km	38.9244°N 106.3207°W
17	Mount Rainier (Note: The summit of Mount Rainier is the highest point of the Cascade Range and the U.S. State of Washington. Mount Rainier is the most prominent summit in the contiguous United States and the fourth most prominent in North America.) (Note: The elevation of Mount Rainier includes an adjustment of +1.914 m (6.28 ft) from NGVD 29 to NAVD 88.)	Washington	Cascade Range	14,417 ft 4394 m	13,210 ft 4026 m	731 mi 1,177 km	46.8529°N 121.7604°W
18	Mount Williamson (Note: The elevation of Mount Williamson includes an adjustment of +1.807 m (5.93 ft) from NGVD 29 to NAVD 88.)	California	Sierra Nevada	14,379 ft 4383 m	1,676 ft 511 m	5.41 mi 8.7 km	36.6559°N 118.3111°W
19	Blanca Peak (Note: The summit of Blanca Peak is the highest point of the Sangre de Cristo Mountains and the entire Rio Grande drainage basin.) (Note: Blanca Peak is the southernmost ultra-prominent summit of the Rocky Mountains.) (Note: The elevation of Blanca Peak includes an adjustment of +1.755 m (5.76 ft) from NGVD 29 to NAVD 88.)	Colorado	Sangre de Cristo Mountains	14,351 ft 4374 m	5,326 ft 1623 m	103.4 mi 166.4 km	37.5775°N 105.4856°W
20	La Plata Peak (Note: The elevation of La Plata Peak includes an adjustment of +1.983 m (6.51 ft) from NGVD 29 to NAVD 88.)	Colorado	Sawatch Range	14,343 ft 4372 m	1,836 ft 560 m	6.28 mi 10.11 km	39.0294°N 106.4729°W
21	Uncompahgre Peak (Note: The summit of Uncompahgre Peak is the highest point of the San Juan Mountains and the entire Gulf of California drainage basin.) (Note: Uncompahgre Peak is the westernmost summit of its elevation in the Rocky Mountains.)	Colorado	San Juan Mountains	14,321 ft 4365 m	4,277 ft 1304 m	85 mi 136.8 km	38.0717°N 107.4621°W
22	Crestone Peak (Note: The summit of Crestone Peak is the highest point of the Crestones.) (Note: The elevation of Crestone Peak includes an adjustment of +1.76 m (5.77 ft) from NGVD 29 to NAVD 88.)	Colorado	Sangre de Cristo Range	14,300 ft 4359 m	4,554 ft 1388 m	27.4 mi 44 km	37.9669°N 105.5855°W
23	Mount Lincoln (Note: The summit of Mount Lincoln is the highest point of the Mosquito Range and the entire Missouri River drainage basin.) (Note: Mount Lincoln is the northernmost summit of its elevation in the Rocky Mountains.)	Colorado	Mosquito Range	14,293 ft 4356.5 m	3,862 ft 1177 m	22.5 mi 36.2 km	39.3515°N 106.1116°W
24	Castle Peak (Note: The summit of Castle Peak is the highest point of the Elk Mountains.)	Colorado	Elk Mountains	14,279 ft 4352.2 m	2,365 ft 721 m	20.9 mi 33.6 km	39.0097°N 106.8614°W
25	Grays Peak (Note: The summit of Grays Peak is the highest point of the Front Range and the Continental Divide in North America.) (Note: Grays Peak is the northernmost summit of its elevation in the Rocky Mountains.)	Colorado	Front Range	14,278 ft 4352 m	2,770 ft 844 m	25 mi 40.2 km	39.6339°N 105.8176°W
26	Mount Antero (Note: The summit of Mount Antero is the highest point of the southern Sawatch Range.)	Colorado	Sawatch Range	14,276 ft 4351.4 m	2,503 ft 763 m	17.67 mi 28.4 km	38.6741°N 106.2462°W
27	Mount Blue Sky (Note: The summit elevation of Mount Blue Sky includes a vertical offset of +1.798 m (5.9 ft) from the station benchmark.)	Colorado	Front Range	14,271 ft 4350 m	2,770 ft 844 m	9.79 mi 15.76 km	39.5883°N 105.6438°W
28	Longs Peak (Note: The summit of Longs Peak is the highest point of the northern Front Range.) (Note: Longs Peak is the northernmost 14,000-foot (4267-meter) summit of the Rocky Mountains.)	Colorado	Front Range	14,259 ft 4346 m	2,940 ft 896 m	43.6 mi 70.2 km	40.2550°N 105.6151°W
29	Mount Wilson (Note: The summit of Mount Wilson is the highest point of the San Miguel Mountains.) (Note: Mount Wilson is the westernmost summit of its elevation in the Rocky Mountains.) (Note: The elevation of Mount Wilson includes an adjustment of +1.899 m (6.23 ft) from NGVD 29 to NAVD 88.)	Colorado	San Miguel Mountains	14,252 ft 4344 m	4,024 ft 1227 m	33 mi 53.1 km	37.8391°N 107.9916°W
30	White Mountain Peak (Note: The summit of White Mountain Peak is the highest point of the White Mountains.)	California	White Mountains	14,252 ft 4344 m	7,196 ft 2193 m	67.4 mi 108.6 km	37.6341°N 118.2557°W
31	North Palisade (Note: The summit of North Palisade is the highest point of the Palisades.) (Note: The elevation of North Palisade includes an adjustment of +1.867 m (6.13 ft) from NGVD 29 to NAVD 88.)	California	Sierra Nevada	14,248 ft 4343 m	2,894 ft 882 m	32.2 mi 51.8 km	37.0943°N 118.5145°W
32	Mount Princeton	Colorado	Sawatch Range	14,204 ft 4329.3 m	2,177 ft 664 m	5.19 mi 8.36 km	38.7492°N 106.2424°W
33	Mount Yale	Colorado	Sawatch Range	14,200 ft 4328.2 m	1,896 ft 578 m	5.55 mi 8.93 km	38.8442°N 106.3138°W
34	Mount Shasta (Note: The summit of Mount Shasta is the highest point of the southern Cascade Range.)	California	Cascade Range	14,179 ft 4321.8 m	9,772 ft 2979 m	335 mi 539 km	41.4092°N 122.1949°W
35	Maroon Peak	Colorado	Elk Mountains	14,163 ft 4317 m	2,336 ft 712 m	8.06 mi 12.97 km	39.0708°N 106.9890°W
36	Mount Wrangell	Alaska	Wrangell Mountains	14,163 ft 4317 m	5,613 ft 1711 m	14.79 mi 23.8 km	62.0059°N 144.0187°W
37	Mount Sneffels (Note: The summit of Mount Sneffels is the highest point of the Sneffels Range.)	Colorado	Sneffels Range	14,158 ft 4315.4 m	3,050 ft 930 m	15.71 mi 25.3 km	38.0038°N 107.7923°W
38	Capitol Peak (Note: The elevation of Capitol Peak includes an adjustment of +1.991 m (6.53 ft) from NGVD 29 to NAVD 88.)	Colorado	Elk Mountains	14,137 ft 4309 m	1,750 ft 533 m	7.44 mi 11.98 km	39.1503°N 107.0829°W
39	Pikes Peak (Note: Pikes Peak is the easternmost 14,000-foot (4267-meter) summit and ultra-prominent summit of the Rocky Mountains. Pikes Peak was the inspiration for the lyrics of America the Beautiful.)	Colorado	Front Range	14,115 ft 4302.31 m	5,530 ft 1686 m	60.6 mi 97.6 km	38.8405°N 105.0442°W
40	Windom Peak (Note: The summit of Windom Peak is the highest point of the Needle Mountains.) (Note: Mount Eolus may be higher than Windom Peak.) (Note: The elevation of Windom Peak includes an adjustment of +1.785 m (5.86 ft) from NGVD 29 to NAVD 88.)	Colorado	Needle Mountains	14,093 ft 4296 m	2,187 ft 667 m	26.3 mi 42.4 km	37.6212°N 107.5919°W
41	Mount Augusta	Alaska; Yukon	Saint Elias Mountains	14,070 ft 4289 m	5,082 ft 1549 m	14.41 mi 23.2 km	60.3074°N 140.4584°W
42	Handies Peak	Colorado	San Juan Mountains	14,058 ft 4284.8 m	1,908 ft 582 m	11.18 mi 18 km	37.9130°N 107.5044°W
43	Culebra Peak (Note: The summit of Culebra Peak is the highest point of the Culebra Range.) (Note: Culebra Peak is the southernmost 14,000-foot (4267-meter) summit of the Rocky Mountains.) (Note: The elevation of Culebra Peak includes an adjustment of +1.74 m (5.71 ft) from NGVD 29 to NAVD 88.)	Colorado	Culebra Range	14,053 ft 4283 m	4,827 ft 1471 m	35.4 mi 56.9 km	37.1224°N 105.1858°W
44	San Luis Peak	Colorado	San Juan Mountains	14,022 ft 4273.8 m	3,113 ft 949 m	26.9 mi 43.4 km	37.9868°N 106.9313°W
45	Mount of the Holy Cross (Note: The summit of Mount of the Holy Cross is the highest point of the northern Sawatch Range.) (Note: The summit elevation of Mount of the Holy Cross includes a vertical offset of +0.61 m (2 ft) from the station benchmark.)	Colorado	Sawatch Range	14,011 ft 4270.5 m	2,113 ft 644 m	18.41 mi 29.6 km	39.4668°N 106.4817°W
46	Grizzly Peak	Colorado	Sawatch Range	13,995 ft 4265.6 m	1,928 ft 588 m	6.77 mi 10.89 km	39.0425°N 106.5976°W
47	Mount Humphreys (Note: The elevation of Mount Humphreys includes an adjustment of +1.842 m (6.04 ft) from NGVD 29 to NAVD 88.)	California	Sierra Nevada	13,992 ft 4265 m	2,563 ft 781 m	14.71 mi 23.7 km	37.2705°N 118.6730°W
48	Mount Keith (Note: The elevation of Mount Keith includes an adjustment of +1.795 m (5.89 ft) from NGVD 29 to NAVD 88.)	California	Sierra Nevada	13,982 ft 4262 m	1,936 ft 590 m	3.09 mi 4.97 km	36.7001°N 118.3436°W
49	Mount Ouray (Note: The summit of Mount Ouray is the highest point of the far southern Sawatch Range.)	Colorado	Sawatch Range	13,961 ft 4255.4 m	2,659 ft 810 m	13.58 mi 21.9 km	38.4227°N 106.2247°W
50	Vermilion Peak (Note: The elevation of Vermilion Peak includes an adjustment of +1.827 m (5.99 ft) from NGVD 29 to NAVD 88.)	Colorado	San Juan Mountains	13,900 ft 4237 m	2,105 ft 642 m	9.07 mi 14.6 km	37.7993°N 107.8285°W
51	Atna Peaks	Alaska	Wrangell Mountains	13,860 ft 4225 m	2,210 ft 674 m	3.64 mi 5.86 km	61.7495°N 143.2414°W
52	Regal Mountain	Alaska	Wrangell Mountains	13,845 ft 4220 m	4,395 ft 1340 m	12.25 mi 19.72 km	61.7438°N 142.8675°W
53	Mount Darwin (Note: The elevation of Mount Darwin includes an adjustment of +1.886 m (6.19 ft) from NGVD 29 to NAVD 88.)	California	Sierra Nevada	13,837 ft 4218 m	1,891 ft 576 m	7.13 mi 11.48 km	37.1669°N 118.6721°W
54	Mount Hayes (Note: The summit of Mount Hayes is the highest point of the Hayes Range.) (Note: Mount Hayes is the northernmost 4000-meter (13,123-foot) summit of Alaska, the United States, and greater North America.)	Alaska	Alaska Range	13,832 ft 4216 m	11,507 ft 3507 m	125.5 mi 202 km	63.6203°N 146.7178°W
55	Mount Silverheels	Colorado	Front Range	13,829 ft 4215 m	2,283 ft 696 m	5.48 mi 8.82 km	39.3394°N 106.0054°W
56	Rio Grande Pyramid	Colorado	San Juan Mountains	13,827 ft 4214.4 m	1,881 ft 573 m	10.76 mi 17.31 km	37.6797°N 107.3924°W
57	Gannett Peak (Note: The summit of Gannett Peak is the highest point of the Wind River Range, the U.S. State of Wyoming, and the central Rocky Mountains.) (Note: Gannett Peak is the northernmost and westernmost summit of its elevation in the Rocky Mountains.)	Wyoming	Wind River Range	13,809 ft 4209.1 m	7,076 ft 2157 m	290 mi 467 km	43.1842°N 109.6542°W
58	Mount Kaweah (Note: The summit of Mount Kaweah is the highest point of the Great Western Divide.) (Note: Mount Kaweah is the southernmost summit of its elevation in United States.) (Note: The elevation of Mount Kaweah includes an adjustment of +1.652 m (5.42 ft) from NGVD 29 to NAVD 88.)	California	Sierra Nevada	13,807 ft 4209 m	2,027 ft 618 m	10.73 mi 17.27 km	36.5261°N 118.4785°W
59	Mauna Kea (Note: The summit of Mauna Kea is the highest point of the Island of Hawaiʻi, the U.S. State of Hawaiʻi, and all islands of the Pacific Ocean.) (Note: Mauna Kea is the tallest mountain on Earth as measured from base to summit. The shield volcano sits on the ocean floor at a depth of 5998 meters (19,678 feet) for a total height of 10,205.3 meters (33,482 feet).)	Hawaii	Island of Hawaiʻi	13,803 ft 4207.3 m	13,803 ft 4207 m	2,453 mi 3,947 km	19.8207°N 155.4681°W
60	Grand Teton (Note: The summit of Grand Teton is the highest point of the Teton Range.) (Note: Grand Teton is the northernmost and westernmost 4000-meter (13,123-foot) summit of the Rocky Mountains.)	Wyoming	Teton Range	13,775 ft 4198.7 m	6,545 ft 1995 m	69.4 mi 111.6 km	43.7412°N 110.8024°W
61	Mount Cook	Alaska; Yukon	Saint Elias Mountains	13,760 ft 4194 m	7,710 ft 2350 m	14.54 mi 23.4 km	60.1816°N 139.9811°W
62	Mount Morgan	California	Sierra Nevada	13,758 ft 4193.4 m	2,648 ft 807 m	9.86 mi 15.87 km	37.4053°N 118.7329°W
63	Mount Gabb (Note: The elevation of Mount Gabb includes an adjustment of +1.958 m (6.42 ft) from NGVD 29 to NAVD 88.)	California	Sierra Nevada	13,747 ft 4190 m	2,601 ft 793 m	4.28 mi 6.89 km	37.3769°N 118.8025°W
64	Bald Mountain (Note: The elevation of Bald Mountain includes an adjustment of +1.922 m (6.31 ft) from NGVD 29 to NAVD 88.)	Colorado	Front Range	13,690 ft 4173 m	2,099 ft 640 m	7.51 mi 12.09 km	39.4448°N 105.9705°W
65	Mount Oso (Note: The elevation of Mount Oso includes an adjustment of +1.776 m (5.83 ft) from NGVD 29 to NAVD 88.)	Colorado	San Juan Mountains	13,690 ft 4173 m	1,664 ft 507 m	5.41 mi 8.71 km	37.6070°N 107.4936°W
66	Mauna Loa (Note: Mauna Loa is the southernmost and westernmost 4000-meter (13,123-foot) summit of Hawaiʻi and the United States.) (Note: The shield volcano Mauna Loa is the most voluminous mountain on Earth with an estimated volume of 74,000 km^{3} (18,000 cu mi), or enough material to fill the Grand Canyon more than 18 times.)	Hawaii	Island of Hawaiʻi	13,679 ft 4169 m	7,099 ft 2164 m	25.4 mi 40.8 km	19.4756°N 155.6054°W
67	Mount Jackson	Colorado	Sawatch Range	13,676 ft 4168.5 m	1,810 ft 552 m	3.21 mi 5.16 km	39.4853°N 106.5367°W
68	Mount Tom (Note: The elevation of Mount Tom includes an adjustment of +1.379 m (4.52 ft) from NGVD 29 to NAVD 88.)	California	Sierra Nevada	13,657 ft 4163 m	1,992 ft 607 m	4.77 mi 7.67 km	37.3385°N 118.6570°W
69	Bard Peak (Note: The elevation of Bard Peak includes an adjustment of +1.707 m (5.6 ft) from NGVD 29 to NAVD 88.)	Colorado	Front Range	13,647 ft 4159 m	1,701 ft 518 m	5.43 mi 8.74 km	39.7204°N 105.8044°W
70	West Spanish Peak (Note: West Spanish Peak is the easternmost 4000-meter (13,123-foot) summit of the Rocky Mountains and the United States.) (Note: The elevation of West Spanish Peak includes an adjustment of +1.468 m (4.82 ft) from NGVD 29 to NAVD 88.)	Colorado	Spanish Peaks	13,631 ft 4155 m	3,686 ft 1123 m	19.87 mi 32 km	37.3756°N 104.9934°W
71	Mount Powell (Note: The summit of Mount Powell is the highest point of the Gore Range.) (Note: The elevation of Mount Powell includes an adjustment of +1.771 m (5.81 ft) from NGVD 29 to NAVD 88.)	Colorado	Gore Range	13,586 ft 4141 m	3,000 ft 914 m	21.5 mi 34.6 km	39.7601°N 106.3407°W
72	Hagues Peak (Note: The summit of Hagues Peak is the highest point of the Mummy Range.)	Colorado	Mummy Range	13,573 ft 4137 m	2,420 ft 738 m	15.7 mi 25.3 km	40.4845°N 105.6464°W
73	Mount Dubois (Note: The elevation of Mount Dubois includes an adjustment of +1.879 m (6.16 ft) from NGVD 29 to NAVD 88.)	California	White Mountains	13,565 ft 4135 m	2,339 ft 713 m	9.63 mi 15.5 km	37.7834°N 118.3432°W
74	Tower Mountain (Note: The elevation of Tower Mountain includes an adjustment of +1.796 m (5.89 ft) from NGVD 29 to NAVD 88.)	Colorado	San Juan Mountains	13,558 ft 4132 m	1,652 ft 504 m	4.88 mi 7.86 km	37.8573°N 107.6230°W
75	Treasure Mountain (Note: The elevation of Treasure Mountain includes an adjustment of +2.008 m (6.59 ft) from NGVD 29 to NAVD 88.)	Colorado	Elk Mountains	13,535 ft 4125 m	2,828 ft 862 m	6.92 mi 11.13 km	39.0244°N 107.1228°W
76	Kings Peak (Note: The summit of Kings Peak is the highest point of the Uinta Mountains, the U.S. State of Utah, and the western Rocky Mountains.) (Note: The elevation of Kings Peak includes an adjustment of +1.807 m (5.93 ft) from NGVD 29 to NAVD 88.)	Utah	Uinta Mountains	13,534 ft 4125 m	6,358 ft 1938 m	166.6 mi 268 km	40.7763°N 110.3729°W
77	North Arapaho Peak (Note: The summit of North Arapaho Peak is the highest point of the Indian Peaks.) (Note: The elevation of North Arapaho Peak includes an adjustment of +1.763 m (5.78 ft) from NGVD 29 to NAVD 88.)	Colorado	Front Range	13,508 ft 4117 m	1,665 ft 507 m	15.38 mi 24.8 km	40.0265°N 105.6504°W
78	Mount Pinchot (Note: The elevation of Mount Pinchot includes an adjustment of +1.81 m (5.94 ft) from NGVD 29 to NAVD 88.)	California	Sierra Nevada	13,500 ft 4115 m	2,110 ft 643 m	4.71 mi 7.58 km	36.9473°N 118.4054°W
79	Mount Natazhat	Alaska	Saint Elias Mountains	13,435 ft 4095 m	5,985 ft 1824 m	15.49 mi 24.9 km	61.5217°N 141.1030°W
80	Mount Jarvis	Alaska	Wrangell Mountains	13,421 ft 4091 m	4,771 ft 1454 m	11.15 mi 17.95 km	62.0234°N 143.6198°W
81	Parry Peak (Note: The elevation of Parry Peak includes an adjustment of +1.763 m (5.78 ft) from NGVD 29 to NAVD 88.)	Colorado	Front Range	13,397 ft 4083 m	1,720 ft 524 m	9.46 mi 15.22 km	39.8381°N 105.7132°W
82	Bill Williams Peak (Note: The summit of Bill Williams Peak is the highest point of the Williams Mountains.) (Note: The elevation of Bill Williams Peak includes an adjustment of +2.044 m (6.71 ft) from NGVD 29 to NAVD 88.)	Colorado	Williams Mountains	13,389 ft 4081 m	1,682 ft 513 m	3.72 mi 5.98 km	39.1806°N 106.6102°W
83	Sultan Mountain (Note: The elevation of Sultan Mountain includes an adjustment of +1.649 m (5.41 ft) from NGVD 29 to NAVD 88.)	Colorado	San Juan Mountains	13,373 ft 4076 m	1,868 ft 569 m	4.59 mi 7.39 km	37.7859°N 107.7038°W
84	Mount Herard (Note: The elevation of Mount Herard includes an adjustment of +1.64 m (5.38 ft) from NGVD 29 to NAVD 88.)	Colorado	Sangre de Cristo Mountains	13,345 ft 4068 m	2,040 ft 622 m	4.63 mi 7.45 km	37.8492°N 105.4949°W
85	West Buffalo Peak (Note: The elevation of West Buffalo Peak includes an adjustment of +1.834 m (6.02 ft) from NGVD 29 to NAVD 88.)	Colorado	Mosquito Range	13,332 ft 4064 m	1,986 ft 605 m	9.61 mi 15.46 km	38.9917°N 106.1249°W
86	Tressider Peak	Alaska	Saint Elias Mountains	13,315 ft 4058 m	1,665 ft 507 m	3.32 mi 5.34 km	61.3590°N 141.6664°W
87	Summit Peak (Note: The summit of Summit Peak is the highest point of the southern San Juan Mountains.)	Colorado	San Juan Mountains	13,308 ft 4056.2 m	2,760 ft 841 m	39.6 mi 63.7 km	37.3506°N 106.6968°W
88	Middle Peak (Note: Dolores Peak may be higher than Middle Peak.) (Note: The elevation of Middle Peak includes an adjustment of +1.809 m (5.94 ft) from NGVD 29 to NAVD 88.)	Colorado	San Miguel Mountains	13,306 ft 4056 m	1,960 ft 597 m	4.78 mi 7.69 km	37.8536°N 108.1082°W
89	Antora Peak (Note: The elevation of Antora Peak includes an adjustment of +1.883 m (6.18 ft) from NGVD 29 to NAVD 88.)	Colorado	Sawatch Range	13,275 ft 4046 m	2,409 ft 734 m	6.75 mi 10.86 km	38.3250°N 106.2180°W
90	Henry Mountain (Note: The elevation of Henry Mountain includes an adjustment of +2.037 m (6.68 ft) from NGVD 29 to NAVD 88.)	Colorado	Sawatch Range	13,261 ft 4042 m	1,674 ft 510 m	10.94 mi 17.61 km	38.6856°N 106.6211°W
91	Hesperus Mountain (Note: The summit of Hesperus Mountain is the highest point of the La Plata Mountains.) (Note: The elevation of Hesperus Mountain includes an adjustment of +1.65 m (5.41 ft) from NGVD 29 to NAVD 88.)	Colorado	La Plata Mountains	13,237 ft 4035 m	2,852 ft 869 m	24.5 mi 39.5 km	37.4451°N 108.0890°W
92	Mount Silverthrone	Alaska	Alaska Range	13,220 ft 4029 m	3,240 ft 988 m	7.9 mi 12.72 km	63.1157°N 150.6755°W
93	Jacque Peak (Note: The elevation of Jacque Peak includes an adjustment of +1.866 m (6.12 ft) from NGVD 29 to NAVD 88.)	Colorado	Gore Range	13,211 ft 4027 m	2,065 ft 629 m	4.52 mi 7.28 km	39.4549°N 106.1970°W
94	Bennett Peak (Note: The elevation of Bennett Peak includes an adjustment of +1.782 m (5.85 ft) from NGVD 29 to NAVD 88.)	Colorado	San Juan Mountains	13,209 ft 4026 m	1,743 ft 531 m	17.08 mi 27.5 km	37.4833°N 106.4343°W
95	Wind River Peak (Note: The summit of Wind River Peak is the highest point of the southern Wind River Range.)	Wyoming	Wind River Range	13,197 ft 4022.4 m	2,572 ft 784 m	35.1 mi 56.6 km	42.7085°N 109.1284°W
96	Conejos Peak	Colorado	San Juan Mountains	13,179 ft 4017 m	1,912 ft 583 m	8.15 mi 13.12 km	37.2887°N 106.5709°W
97	Mount Marcus Baker (Note: The summit of Mount Marcus Baker is the highest point of the Chugach Mountains.)	Alaska	Chugach Mountains	13,176 ft 4016 m	10,751 ft 3277 m	126.3 mi 203 km	61.4374°N 147.7525°W
98	Cloud Peak (Note: The summit of Cloud Peak is the highest point of the Bighorn Mountains.) (Note: Cloud Peak is the northernmost 4000-meter (13,123-foot) summit of the Rocky Mountains.)	Wyoming	Bighorn Mountains	13,167 ft 4013.3 m	7,077 ft 2157 m	145 mi 233 km	44.3821°N 107.1739°W
98	Wheeler Peak (Note: The summit of Wheeler Peak is the highest point of the Taos Mountains and the U.S. State of New Mexico.) (Note: Wheeler Peak is the southernmost 4000-meter (13,123-foot) summit of the Rocky Mountains.)	New Mexico	Taos Mountains	13,167 ft 4013.3 m	3,409 ft 1039 m	37 mi 59.6 km	36.5569°N 105.4169°W
100	Francs Peak (Note: The summit of Francs Peak is the highest point of the Absaroka Range.)	Wyoming	Absaroka Range	13,164 ft 4012.3 m	4,056 ft 1236 m	47.2 mi 76 km	43.9613°N 109.3392°W
101	Twilight Peak (Note: The summit of Twilight Peak is the highest point of the West Needle Mountains.) (Note: The elevation of Twilight Peak includes an adjustment of +1.537 m (5.04 ft) from NGVD 29 to NAVD 88.)	Colorado	Needle Mountains	13,163 ft 4012 m	2,338 ft 713 m	4.88 mi 7.86 km	37.6630°N 107.7270°W
102	South River Peak	Colorado	San Juan Mountains	13,154 ft 4009.4 m	2,448 ft 746 m	21.1 mi 34 km	37.5741°N 106.9815°W
103	Mount Ritter (Note: The summit of Mount Ritter is the highest point of the Ritter Range.) (Note: The elevation of Mount Ritter includes an adjustment of +1.786 m (5.86 ft) from NGVD 29 to NAVD 88.)	California	Sierra Nevada	13,149 ft 4008 m	3,990 ft 1216 m	22 mi 35.4 km	37.6891°N 119.1996°W
104	Red Slate Mountain (Note: The elevation of Red Slate Mountain includes an adjustment of +1.893 m (6.21 ft) from NGVD 29 to NAVD 88.)	California	Sierra Nevada	13,129 ft 4002 m	1,736 ft 529 m	8.31 mi 13.38 km	37.5075°N 118.8693°W
105	Mount Lyell (California)	California	Sierra Nevada	13,120 ft 3998.9 m	1,926 ft 587 m	5.26 mi 8.46 km	37.7394°N 119.2716°W
106	Bushnell Peak	Colorado	Sangre de Cristo Mountains	13,110 ft 3995.8 m	2,405 ft 733 m	11.07 mi 17.82 km	38.3412°N 105.8892°W
107	Truchas Peak (Note: The summit of Truchas Peak is the highest point of the Santa Fe Mountains.) (Note: Truchas Peak is the southernmost summit of its elevation in the Rocky Mountains.)	New Mexico	Santa Fe Mountains	13,108 ft 3995.2 m	4,001 ft 1220 m	42.3 mi 68.2 km	35.9625°N 105.6450°W
108	Wheeler Peak (Note: The summit of Wheeler Peak is the highest point of the Snake Range.)	Nevada	Snake Range	13,065 ft 3982.3 m	7,568 ft 2307 m	232 mi 373 km	38.9858°N 114.3139°W
109	Mount Dana	California	Sierra Nevada	13,063 ft 3981.5 m	2,437 ft 743 m	11.4 mi 18.35 km	37.8999°N 119.2211°W
110	West Elk Peak (Note: The summit of West Elk Peak is the highest point of the West Elk Mountains.)	Colorado	West Elk Mountains	13,042 ft 3975.2 m	3,095 ft 943 m	13.78 mi 22.2 km	38.7179°N 107.1994°W
111	Mount Moffit	Alaska	Alaska Range	13,020 ft 3969 m	3,970 ft 1210 m	10.2 mi 16.41 km	63.5683°N 146.3982°W
112	Mount Centennial (Note: The elevation of Mount Centennial includes an adjustment of +1.814 m (5.95 ft) from NGVD 29 to NAVD 88.) (Peak 13010)	Colorado	San Juan Mountains	13,016 ft 3967 m	1,790 ft 546 m	2.86 mi 4.61 km	37.6062°N 107.2446°W
113	Kuna Peak	California	Sierra Nevada	13,009 ft 3965 m	1,923 ft 586 m	6.03 mi 9.71 km	37.8129°N 119.2083°W
114	Clark Peak (Note: The summit of Clark Peak is the highest point of the Medicine Bow Mountains.)	Colorado	Medicine Bow Mountains	12,954 ft 3948.4 m	2,771 ft 845 m	16.4 mi 26.4 km	40.6068°N 105.9300°W
115	Mount Richthofen (Note: The summit of Mount Richthofen is the highest point of the Never Summer Mountains.) (Note: The elevation of Mount Richthofen includes an adjustment of +1.658 m (5.44 ft) from NGVD 29 to NAVD 88.)	Colorado	Never Summer Mountains	12,945 ft 3946 m	2,680 ft 817 m	9.66 mi 15.54 km	40.4695°N 105.8945°W
116	Mount Root	Alaska; British Columbia	Saint Elias Mountains	12,887 ft 3928 m	2,979 ft 908 m	5.46 mi 8.79 km	58.9854°N 137.5001°W
117	Lizard Head Peak (Note: The summit of Lizard Head Peak is the highest point of the Cirque of the Towers.) (Note: The elevation of Lizard Head Peak includes an adjustment of +1.572 m (5.16 ft) from NGVD 29 to NAVD 88.)	Wyoming	Wind River Range	12,847 ft 3916 m	1,902 ft 580 m	6.46 mi 10.4 km	42.7901°N 109.1978°W
118	Granite Peak (Note: The summit of Granite Peak is the highest point of the Beartooth Mountains and the U.S. State of Montana.)	Montana	Beartooth Mountains	12,807 ft 3903.5 m	4,779 ft 1457 m	86 mi 138.5 km	45.1634°N 109.8075°W
119	Mount Crosson	Alaska	Alaska Range	12,800 ft 3901 m	1,650 ft 503 m	5.11 mi 8.22 km	63.0081°N 151.2763°W
120	Venado Peak (Note: The elevation of Venado Peak includes an adjustment of +1.65 m (5.41 ft) from NGVD 29 to NAVD 88.)	New Mexico	Taos Mountains	12,739 ft 3883 m	2,971 ft 906 m	11.8 mi 18.99 km	36.7917°N 105.4933°W
121	Chair Mountain	Colorado	Elk Mountains	12,727 ft 3879.1 m	2,461 ft 750 m	8.89 mi 14.3 km	39.0581°N 107.2822°W
122	Mount Peale (Note: The summit of Mount Peale is the highest point of the La Sal Mountains and the Colorado Plateau.)	Utah	La Sal Mountains	12,726 ft 3879 m	6,181 ft 1884 m	72.8 mi 117.1 km	38.4385°N 109.2292°W
122	Mount Crillon	Alaska	Saint Elias Mountains	12,726 ft 3879 m	7,176 ft 2187 m	19.52 mi 31.4 km	58.6625°N 137.1712°W
124	Mount Gunnison	Colorado	West Elk Mountains	12,725 ft 3878.7 m	3,539 ft 1079 m	11.84 mi 19.05 km	38.8121°N 107.3826°W
125	Gold Hill	New Mexico	Taos Mountains	12,700 ft 3871 m	1,715 ft 523 m	6.06 mi 9.76 km	36.6432°N 105.4560°W
126	East Spanish Peak (Note: East Spanish Peak is the easternmost 3000-meter (9843-foot) summit of the Rocky Mountains and the entire United States.) (Note: The elevation of East Spanish Peak includes an adjustment of +1.372 m (4.5 ft) from NGVD 29 to NAVD 88.)	Colorado	Spanish Peaks	12,688 ft 3867 m	2,383 ft 726 m	4.21 mi 6.78 km	37.3934°N 104.9201°W
127	Borah Peak (Note: The summit of Borah Peak is the highest point of the Lost River Range and the U.S. State of Idaho.)	Idaho	Lost River Range	12,668 ft 3861.2 m	6,002 ft 1829 m	150.8 mi 243 km	44.1374°N 113.7811°W
128	Mount Wood (Note: The summit of Mount Wood is the highest point of the Granite Range.) (Note: The elevation of Mount Wood includes an adjustment of +1.516 m (4.97 ft) from NGVD 29 to NAVD 88.)	Montana	Absaroka Range	12,665 ft 3860 m	2,880 ft 878 m	7.48 mi 12.04 km	45.2749°N 109.8078°W
129	Mount Gunnar Naslund	Alaska	Saint Elias Mountains	12,658 ft 3858 m	2,108 ft 643 m	6.86 mi 11.04 km	61.2282°N 141.3140°W
130	Mount Conness	California	Sierra Nevada	12,649 ft 3855.5 m	2,650 ft 808 m	7.18 mi 11.55 km	37.9670°N 119.3213°W
131	Humphreys Peak (Note: The summit of Humphreys Peak is the highest point of the San Francisco Peaks and the U.S. State of Arizona.) (Note: The elevation of Humphreys Peak includes an adjustment of +1.345 m (4.41 ft) from NGVD 29 to NAVD 88.)	Arizona	San Francisco Peaks	12,637 ft 3852 m	6,039 ft 1841 m	246 mi 396 km	35.3464°N 111.6780°W
132	Santa Fe Baldy (Note: Santa Fe Baldy is the southernmost 3000-meter (9843-foot) summit of the Rocky Mountains.)	New Mexico	Santa Fe Mountains	12,632 ft 3850.1 m	2,002 ft 610 m	10.99 mi 17.69 km	35.8322°N 105.7581°W
133	Gothic Mountain (Note: The elevation of Gothic Mountain includes an adjustment of +1.936 m (6.35 ft) from NGVD 29 to NAVD 88.)	Colorado	Elk Mountains	12,631 ft 3850 m	1,645 ft 501 m	2.73 mi 4.39 km	38.9562°N 107.0107°W
134	Castle Mountain	Montana	Absaroka Range	12,618 ft 3846.1 m	2,672 ft 814 m	9.74 mi 15.67 km	45.0989°N 109.6305°W
134	Lone Cone	Colorado	San Miguel Mountains	12,618 ft 3846.1 m	2,273 ft 693 m	8.4 mi 13.52 km	37.8880°N 108.2556°W
136	Mount Moran	Wyoming	Teton Range	12,610 ft 3843.5 m	2,645 ft 806 m	6.18 mi 9.94 km	43.8350°N 110.7765°W
137	Mount Tlingit	Alaska	Saint Elias Mountains	12,606 ft 3842 m	2,006 ft 611 m	2.26 mi 3.63 km	58.8931°N 137.3938°W
138	Little Costilla Peak	New Mexico	Culebra Range	12,588 ft 3836.8 m	2,444 ft 745 m	7.75 mi 12.48 km	36.8335°N 105.2229°W
139	Mount Carpe	Alaska	Alaska Range	12,550 ft 3825 m	1,800 ft 549 m	4.1 mi 6.6 km	63.1521°N 150.8616°W
140	Needham Mountain (Note: The elevation of Needham Mountain includes an adjustment of +1.602 m (5.26 ft) from NGVD 29 to NAVD 88.)	California	Sierra Nevada	12,545 ft 3824 m	1,840 ft 561 m	5.93 mi 9.54 km	36.4545°N 118.5373°W
141	Graham Peak	Colorado	San Juan Mountains	12,536 ft 3821.1 m	2,551 ft 778 m	8.64 mi 13.9 km	37.4972°N 107.3761°W
142	Whetstone Mountain	Colorado	West Elk Mountains	12,527 ft 3818.1 m	2,456 ft 749 m	9.39 mi 15.11 km	38.8223°N 106.9799°W
143	Kahiltna Dome	Alaska	Alaska Range	12,525 ft 3818 m	2,175 ft 663 m	3.45 mi 5.55 km	63.0550°N 151.2394°W
144	Mount Thor	Alaska	Chugach Mountains	12,521 ft 3816 m	3,271 ft 997 m	20.4 mi 32.8 km	61.4854°N 147.1460°W
145	Mount Watson	Alaska	Saint Elias Mountains	12,497 ft 3809 m	1,932 ft 589 m	2.52 mi 4.05 km	59.0088°N 137.5541°W
146	Atlantic Peak (Note: The elevation of Atlantic Peak includes an adjustment of +1.521 m (4.99 ft) from NGVD 29 to NAVD 88.)	Wyoming	Wind River Range	12,495 ft 3808 m	2,150 ft 655 m	9.07 mi 14.6 km	42.6165°N 109.0013°W
147	Specimen Mountain (Note: The elevation of Specimen Mountain includes an adjustment of +1.614 m (5.3 ft) from NGVD 29 to NAVD 88.)	Colorado	Front Range	12,494 ft 3808 m	1,731 ft 528 m	4.7 mi 7.56 km	40.4449°N 105.8081°W
148	Baldy Mountain (Note: The summit of Baldy Mountain is the highest point of the Cimarron Range.)	New Mexico	Cimarron Range	12,445 ft 3793.3 m	2,701 ft 823 m	11.33 mi 18.24 km	36.6299°N 105.2134°W
149	East Beckwith Mountain	Colorado	West Elk Mountains	12,441 ft 3792.1 m	2,492 ft 760 m	6.24 mi 10.05 km	38.8464°N 107.2233°W
150	Knobby Crest (Note: The summit of Knobby Crest is the highest point of the Kenosha Mountains.) (Note: The elevation of Knobby Crest includes an adjustment of +1.595 m (5.23 ft) from NGVD 29 to NAVD 88.)	Colorado	Kenosha Mountains	12,434 ft 3790 m	1,759 ft 536 m	8.27 mi 13.31 km	39.3681°N 105.6050°W
151	Bison Peak (Note: The summit of Bison Peak is the highest point of the Tarryall Mountains.)	Colorado	Tarryall Mountains	12,432 ft 3789.4 m	2,451 ft 747 m	18.23 mi 29.3 km	39.2384°N 105.4978°W
152	Anthracite Range high point	Colorado	West Elk Mountains	12,394 ft 3777.8 m	2,125 ft 648 m	4.77 mi 7.68 km	38.8145°N 107.1445°W
153	Matchless Mountain (Note: The elevation of Matchless Mountain includes an adjustment of +1.941 m (6.37 ft) from NGVD 29 to NAVD 88.)	Colorado	Elk Mountains	12,389 ft 3776 m	1,763 ft 537 m	7.87 mi 12.67 km	38.8340°N 106.6451°W
154	Flat Top Mountain (Note: The summit of Flat Top Mountain is the highest point of the Flat Tops.)	Colorado	Flat Tops	12,361 ft 3768 m	4,054 ft 1236 m	40.8 mi 65.6 km	40.0147°N 107.0833°W
154	Mount Nystrom	Wyoming	Wind River Range	12,361 ft 3768 m	1,816 ft 554 m	4.92 mi 7.92 km	42.6418°N 109.0939°W
156	Moby Dick	Alaska	Alaska Range	12,360 ft 3767 m	2,910 ft 887 m	4.78 mi 7.7 km	63.5561°N 146.6026°W
157	Greenhorn Mountain (Note: The summit of Greenhorn Mountain is the highest point of the Wet Mountains.)	Colorado	Wet Mountains	12,352 ft 3765 m	3,777 ft 1151 m	25.2 mi 40.6 km	37.8815°N 105.0133°W
158	Elliott Mountain (Note: The elevation of Elliott Mountain includes an adjustment of +1.709 m (5.61 ft) from NGVD 29 to NAVD 88.)	Colorado	San Miguel Mountains	12,346 ft 3763 m	2,240 ft 683 m	5.13 mi 8.26 km	37.7344°N 108.0580°W
159	Mount Deborah (Note: Mount Deborah is the northernmost summit of its elevation in Alaska, the United States, and greater North America.)	Alaska	Alaska Range	12,339 ft 3761 m	5,189 ft 1582 m	16.08 mi 25.9 km	63.6377°N 147.2384°W
160	Mount Warren	California	Sierra Nevada	12,333 ft 3759 m	2,005 ft 611 m	5 mi 8.05 km	37.9898°N 119.2235°W
161	Twin Peaks (Note: The elevation of Twin Peaks includes an adjustment of +1.717 m (5.63 ft) from NGVD 29 to NAVD 88.)	California	Sierra Nevada	12,329 ft 3758 m	2,143 ft 653 m	4.78 mi 7.7 km	38.0836°N 119.3588°W
162	Carter Mountain	Wyoming	Absaroka Range	12,324 ft 3756.4 m	1,699 ft 518 m	16.68 mi 26.8 km	44.1972°N 109.4112°W
163	Mount Waas	Utah	La Sal Mountains	12,316 ft 3753.8 m	1,793 ft 547 m	5.24 mi 8.43 km	38.5391°N 109.2278°W
164	Parkview Mountain (Note: The summit of Parkview Mountain is the highest point of the Rabbit Ears Range.)	Colorado	Rabbit Ears Range	12,301 ft 3749.4 m	2,676 ft 816 m	9.36 mi 15.07 km	40.3303°N 106.1363°W
165	Cornwall Mountain (Note: The elevation of Cornwall Mountain includes an adjustment of +1.715 m (5.63 ft) from NGVD 29 to NAVD 88.)	Colorado	San Juan Mountains	12,291 ft 3746 m	1,744 ft 532 m	5.2 mi 8.37 km	37.3811°N 106.4920°W
166	Mount Adams	Washington	Cascade Range	12,281 ft 3743.4 m	8,136 ft 2480 m	45.8 mi 73.6 km	46.2024°N 121.4909°W
167	Trout Peak (Note: The summit of Trout Peak is the highest point of the central Absaroka Range.)	Wyoming	Absaroka Range	12,250 ft 3733.7 m	3,704 ft 1129 m	28.4 mi 45.7 km	44.6012°N 109.5253°W
168	Mount Huntington	Alaska	Alaska Range	12,240 ft 3730.8 m	2,890 ft 881 m	3.88 mi 6.24 km	62.9677°N 150.8996°W
169	Leatherman Peak (Note: The elevation of Leatherman Peak includes an adjustment of +1.61 m (5.28 ft) from NGVD 29 to NAVD 88.)	Idaho	Lost River Range	12,233 ft 3728.7 m	1,688 ft 515 m	4.51 mi 7.26 km	44.0820°N 113.7330°W
170	Mount Huxley	Alaska	Saint Elias Mountains	12,216 ft 3723.4 m	2,066 ft 630 m	5.49 mi 8.84 km	60.3279°N 141.1554°W
171	Diamond Peak (Note: The summit of Diamond Peak is the highest point of the Lemhi Range.)	Idaho	Lemhi Range	12,202 ft 3719.3 m	5,387 ft 1642 m	31.8 mi 51.2 km	44.1414°N 113.0827°W
172	Mount Jordan	Alaska	Saint Elias Mountains	12,190 ft 3716 m	2,340 ft 713 m	7.08 mi 11.4 km	61.3987°N 141.4700°W
173	Mount Zirkel (Note: The summit of Mount Zirkel is the highest point of the Park Range.) (Note: The elevation of Mount Zirkel includes an adjustment of +1.632 m (5.35 ft) from NGVD 29 to NAVD 88.)	Colorado	Park Range	12,185 ft 3714 m	3,470 ft 1058 m	37.7 mi 60.6 km	40.8313°N 106.6631°W
174	Delano Peak (Note: The summit of Delano Peak is the highest point of the Tushar Mountains.)	Utah	Tushar Mountains	12,174 ft 3710.7 m	4,709 ft 1435 m	112.1 mi 180.5 km	38.3692°N 112.3714°W
175	Wapiti Ridge	Wyoming	Absaroka Range	12,172 ft 3710 m	2,487 ft 758 m	12.63 mi 20.3 km	44.3238°N 109.6063°W
176	Mount Salisbury	Alaska	Saint Elias Mountains	12,170 ft 3709 m	4,020 ft 1225 m	3.04 mi 4.9 km	58.8505°N 137.3719°W
177	Crested Butte (Note: The elevation of Crested Butte includes an adjustment of +1.94 m (6.36 ft) from NGVD 29 to NAVD 88.)	Colorado	Elk Mountains	12,168 ft 3709 m	2,582 ft 787 m	4.65 mi 7.49 km	38.8835°N 106.9436°W
178	Younts Peak	Wyoming	Absaroka Range	12,166 ft 3708.3 m	2,241 ft 683 m	12.7 mi 20.4 km	43.9820°N 109.8665°W
179	Sawtooth Mountain	Colorado	La Garita Mountains	12,153 ft 3704.2 m	1,927 ft 587 m	16.73 mi 26.9 km	38.2740°N 106.8670°W
180	Olancha Peak (Note: The summit of Olancha Peak is the highest point of the southern Sierra Nevada.)	California	Sierra Nevada	12,132 ft 3697.8 m	3,103 ft 946 m	14.84 mi 23.9 km	36.2652°N 118.1182°W
181	Mount Mather	Alaska	Alaska Range	12,123 ft 3695 m	2,873 ft 876 m	9.27 mi 14.92 km	63.1946°N 150.4362°W
182	Park Cone (Note: The elevation of Park Cone includes an adjustment of +1.873 m (6.15 ft) from NGVD 29 to NAVD 88.)	Colorado	Sawatch Range	12,106 ft 3690 m	2,040 ft 622 m	3.44 mi 5.53 km	38.7967°N 106.6028°W
183	Fortress Mountain	Wyoming	Absaroka Range	12,096 ft 3687 m	1,644 ft 501 m	9.49 mi 15.28 km	44.3370°N 109.7974°W
184	Ibapah Peak (Note: The summit of Ibapah Peak is the highest point of the Deep Creek Range.) (Note: The elevation of Ibapah Peak includes an adjustment of +1.517 m (4.98 ft) from NGVD 29 to NAVD 88.)	Utah	Deep Creek Range	12,092 ft 3685.6 m	5,267 ft 1605 m	61.2 mi 98.5 km	39.8282°N 113.9200°W
185	Carbon Peak	Colorado	West Elk Mountains	12,088 ft 3684.3 m	2,179 ft 664 m	3.92 mi 6.31 km	38.7943°N 107.0431°W
186	Glover Peak (Note: The elevation of Glover Peak includes an adjustment of +1.609 m (5.28 ft) from NGVD 29 to NAVD 88.)	Wyoming	Wind River Range	12,072 ft 3680 m	1,706 ft 520 m	2.49 mi 4 km	43.1589°N 109.7656°W
186	Mount Moriah	Nevada	Snake Range	12,072 ft 3680 m	4,909 ft 1496 m	20.3 mi 32.7 km	39.2732°N 114.1988°W
188	Mount Guero	Colorado	West Elk Mountains	12,058 ft 3675.4 m	2,432 ft 741 m	6.38 mi 10.27 km	38.7196°N 107.3861°W
189	Siris Peak	Alaska	Saint Elias Mountains	12,050 ft 3673 m	2,600 ft 792 m	16.05 mi 25.8 km	60.7340°N 141.0138°W
190	Red Table Mountain	Colorado	Sawatch Range	12,043 ft 3670.7 m	2,017 ft 615 m	7.88 mi 12.68 km	39.4181°N 106.7712°W
191	Chalk Benchmark	Colorado	San Juan Mountains	12,038 ft 3669.3 m	1,971 ft 601 m	7.26 mi 11.68 km	37.1418°N 106.7500°W
192	Medicine Bow Peak (Note: The summit of Medicine Bow Peak is the highest point of the Snowy Range.)	Wyoming	Medicine Bow Mountains	12,016 ft 3662.4 m	3,243 ft 988 m	40.6 mi 65.4 km	41.3603°N 106.3176°W
193	Hyndman Peak (Note: The summit of Hyndman Peak is the highest point of the Pioneer Mountains.)	Idaho	Pioneer Mountains	12,012 ft 3661 m	4,829 ft 1472 m	30.1 mi 48.5 km	43.7494°N 114.1311°W
193	Mount Witherspoon	Alaska	Chugach Mountains	12,012 ft 3661 m	2,162 ft 659 m	5.98 mi 9.63 km	61.3954°N 147.2010°W
195	Mount Zwischen (Note: The elevation of Mount Zwischen includes an adjustment of +1.481 m (4.86 ft) from NGVD 29 to NAVD 88.)	Colorado	Sangre de Cristo Mountains	12,011 ft 3660.9 m	2,266 ft 691 m	4.44 mi 7.14 km	37.7913°N 105.4554°W
196	Mount Drum	Alaska	Wrangell Mountains	12,010 ft 3660.7 m	6,760 ft 2060 m	17.73 mi 28.5 km	62.1159°N 144.6394°W
197	Little Cone	Colorado	San Miguel Mountains	11,988 ft 3654 m	1,840 ft 561 m	5.19 mi 8.35 km	37.9275°N 108.0908°W
197	USGS Peak	Idaho	Lost River Range	11,988 ft 3654 m	1,802 ft 549 m	4.14 mi 6.66 km	44.0133°N 113.5818°W
199	Sierra Blanca Peak (Note: The summit of Sierra Blanca Peak is the highest point of the Sacramento Mountains.)	New Mexico	Sacramento Mountains	11,981 ft 3651.8 m	5,553 ft 1693 m	165.7 mi 267 km	33.3743°N 105.8087°W
200	Mount Hope	Alaska	Saint Elias Mountains	11,950 ft 3642 m	2,000 ft 610 m	2.64 mi 4.25 km	60.7039°N 141.0614°W
201	Bald Mountain (Note: The elevation of Bald Mountain includes an adjustment of +1.59 m (5.22 ft) from NGVD 29 to NAVD 88.)	Utah	Uinta Mountains	11,948 ft 3642 m	1,843 ft 562 m	4.01 mi 6.45 km	40.6989°N 110.9031°W
202	Mount Jefferson (Note: The summit of Mount Jefferson is the highest point of the Toquima Range.) (Note: The elevation of Mount Jefferson includes an adjustment of +1.666 m (5.47 ft) from NGVD 29 to NAVD 88.)	Nevada	Toquima Range	11,946 ft 3641 m	5,871 ft 1789 m	98.6 mi 158.7 km	38.7519°N 116.9267°W
203	Hess Mountain (Note: Hess Mountain is the northernmost 3000-meter (9843-foot) summit of Alaska and the United States.)	Alaska	Alaska Range	11,940 ft 3639 m	2,490 ft 759 m	2.78 mi 4.47 km	63.6382°N 147.1482°W
203	Mount Brooks	Alaska	Alaska Range	11,940 ft 3639 m	1,790 ft 546 m	5.03 mi 8.09 km	63.1875°N 150.6479°W
205	Cerro Vista (Note: The summit of Cerro Vista is the highest point of the southern Sangre de Cristo Range.)	New Mexico	Sangre de Cristo Mountains	11,937 ft 3638.3 m	2,519 ft 768 m	14.19 mi 22.8 km	36.2353°N 105.4108°W
206	Mount Nebo (Note: The summit of Mount Nebo is the highest point of the Wasatch Range.) (Note: The elevation of Mount Nebo includes an adjustment of +1.395 m (4.58 ft) from NGVD 29 to NAVD 88.)	Utah	Wasatch Range	11,933 ft 3637 m	5,508 ft 1679 m	75.6 mi 121.6 km	39.8219°N 111.7603°W
207	The Grand Parapet	Alaska	Saint Elias Mountains	11,930 ft 3636 m	2,180 ft 664 m	5.26 mi 8.47 km	61.4103°N 142.0266°W
208	Lituya Mountain	Alaska	Saint Elias Mountains	11,924 ft 3634 m	3,674 ft 1120 m	3.9 mi 6.27 km	58.8054°N 137.4367°W
208	Haydon Peak	Alaska	Saint Elias Mountains	11,924 ft 3634 m	1,674 ft 510 m	2.97 mi 4.78 km	60.2606°N 140.9881°W
210	Charleston Peak (Note: The summit of Charleston Peak is the highest point of the Spring Mountains.) (Mount Charleston)	Nevada	Spring Mountains	11,916 ft 3632 m	8,258 ft 2517 m	135.1 mi 218 km	36.2716°N 115.6956°W
211	Mount Donna	Alaska	Saint Elias Mountains	11,915 ft 3631.7 m	2,665 ft 812 m	6.63 mi 10.67 km	61.1341°N 141.3509°W
212	North Schell Peak (Note: The summit of North Schell Peak is the highest point of the Schell Creek Range.)	Nevada	Schell Creek Range	11,895 ft 3625.6 m	5,413 ft 1650 m	23.5 mi 37.9 km	39.4132°N 114.5997°W
213	Huntsman Ridge (Note: The elevation of Huntsman Ridge includes an adjustment of +1.711 m (5.61 ft) from NGVD 29 to NAVD 88.) (Dutch Peak)	Colorado	Elk Mountains	11,858 ft 3614 m	3,072 ft 936 m	10.3 mi 16.58 km	39.1920°N 107.3668°W
214	Eagle Peak	California	Sierra Nevada	11,854 ft 3613 m	2,359 ft 719 m	5.75 mi 9.26 km	38.1799°N 119.4086°W
215	Sheep Mountain	Colorado	Rabbit Ears Range	11,825 ft 3604.2 m	1,792 ft 546 m	7.16 mi 11.53 km	40.3610°N 106.2658°W
216	South Mountain (Note: The elevation of South Mountain includes an adjustment of +1.437 m (4.71 ft) from NGVD 29 to NAVD 88.)	Utah	La Sal Mountains	11,822 ft 3603.3 m	1,679 ft 512 m	2.65 mi 4.26 km	38.4011°N 109.2615°W
217	Castle Peak (Note: The summit of Castle Peak is the highest point of the White Cloud Mountains.)	Idaho	White Cloud Mountains	11,812 ft 3600.4 m	4,035 ft 1230 m	27.3 mi 44 km	44.0402°N 114.5887°W
218	Arc Dome (Note: The summit of Arc Dome is the highest point of the Toiyabe Range.) (Note: The elevation of Arc Dome includes an adjustment of +1.665 m (5.46 ft) from NGVD 29 to NAVD 88.)	Nevada	Toiyabe Range	11,778 ft 3590 m	5,233 ft 1595 m	23.1 mi 37.2 km	38.8327°N 117.3531°W
219	Tower Peak	California	Sierra Nevada	11,762 ft 3585 m	2,182 ft 665 m	7.93 mi 12.76 km	38.1445°N 119.5477°W
220	Mount Timpanogos (Note: The summit of Mount Timpanogos is the highest point of the central Wasatch Range.)	Utah	Wasatch Range	11,752 ft 3582 m	5,279 ft 1609 m	39.6 mi 63.8 km	40.3908°N 111.6459°W
221	Doubletop Peak (Note: The summit of Doubletop Peak is the highest point of the Gros Ventre Range.) (Note: The elevation of Doubletop Peak includes an adjustment of +1.708 m (5.6 ft) from NGVD 29 to NAVD 88.)	Wyoming	Gros Ventre Range	11,746 ft 3580 m	3,000 ft 914 m	24.8 mi 39.9 km	43.3473°N 110.2864°W
222	Mount Phillips	New Mexico	Cimarron Range	11,742 ft 3579 m	2,921 ft 890 m	7.51 mi 12.09 km	36.4766°N 105.1595°W
223	Ryan Peak (Note: The summit of Ryan Peak is the highest point of the Boulder Mountains.)	Idaho	Boulder Mountains	11,720 ft 3572 m	3,214 ft 980 m	12.97 mi 20.9 km	43.9024°N 114.4096°W
224	Waugh Mountain (Note: The summit of Waugh Mountain is the highest point of the South Park Hills.) (Note: The elevation of Waugh Mountain includes an adjustment of +1.702 m (5.58 ft) from NGVD 29 to NAVD 88.)	Colorado	South Park Hills	11,716 ft 3571 m	2,330 ft 710 m	18.86 mi 30.4 km	38.6022°N 105.6955°W
225	Coal Mountain (Note: The elevation of Coal Mountain includes an adjustment of +1.625 m (5.33 ft) from NGVD 29 to NAVD 88.)	Colorado	West Elk Mountains	11,710 ft 3569 m	1,715 ft 523 m	5.73 mi 9.22 km	38.7870°N 107.4837°W
226	Pilot Peak	Wyoming	Absaroka Range	11,699 ft 3566 m	2,500 ft 762 m	10.69 mi 17.2 km	44°58′36″N 109°52′56″W
227	Mount Patterson (Note: The summit of Mount Patterson is the highest point of the Sweetwater Range.) (Note: The elevation of Mount Patterson includes an adjustment of +1.734 m (5.69 ft) from NGVD 29 to NAVD 88.)	California	Sweetwater Range	11,679 ft 3560 m	4,173 ft 1272 m	18.5 mi 29.8 km	38.4366°N 119.3052°W
228	Mount Russell (Note: Mount Russell is the westernmost summit of its elevation in Alaska and greater North America.)	Alaska	Alaska Range	11,670 ft 3557 m	5,520 ft 1682 m	14.07 mi 22.7 km	62.7984°N 151.8845°W
229	Black Mountain (Note: The elevation of Black Mountain includes an adjustment of +1.631 m (5.35 ft) from NGVD 29 to NAVD 88.)	Colorado	South Park Hills	11,659 ft 3554 m	2,234 ft 681 m	8.03 mi 12.92 km	38.7185°N 105.6874°W
230	Fish Lake Hightop (Note: The summit of Fish Lake Hightop is the highest point of the Fish Lake Plateau.)	Utah	Fish Lake Plateau	11,639 ft 3547.5 m	4,157 ft 1267 m	35.5 mi 57.1 km	38.6080°N 111.7394°W
231	Williams Peak	Colorado	Front Range	11,620 ft 3541.8 m	2,049 ft 625 m	8.66 mi 13.93 km	39.8552°N 106.1854°W
232	Bell Mountain	Idaho	Lemhi Range	11,617 ft 3540.9 m	1,752 ft 534 m	8.56 mi 13.77 km	44.2362°N 113.1939°W
233	Glassford Peak (Note: The elevation of Glassford Peak includes an adjustment of +1.583 m (5.19 ft) from NGVD 29 to NAVD 88.)	Idaho	Boulder Mountains	11,607 ft 3537.9 m	1,782 ft 543 m	3.64 mi 5.85 km	43.9123°N 114.4811°W
234	San Joaquin Mountain (Note: The summit elevation of San Joaquin Mountain includes a vertical offset of +0.61 m (2 ft) from the station benchmark.) (Note: The elevation of San Joaquin Mountain includes an adjustment of +1.7 m (5.58 ft) from NGVD 29 to NAVD 88.)	California	Sierra Nevada	11,606 ft 3537.4 m	1,673 ft 510 m	4.93 mi 7.93 km	37.7187°N 119.1058°W
235	Mount Marvine	Utah	Fish Lake Plateau	11,604 ft 3537 m	1,870 ft 570 m	6.75 mi 10.86 km	38.6682°N 111.6411°W
236	Puma Peak (Note: The elevation of Puma Peak includes an adjustment of +1.513 m (4.96 ft) from NGVD 29 to NAVD 88.)	Colorado	South Park Hills	11,575 ft 3528 m	2,260 ft 689 m	7.11 mi 11.44 km	39.1572°N 105.5815°W
237	Mount Mestas (Note: The elevation of Mount Mestas includes an adjustment of +1.372 m (4.5 ft) from NGVD 29 to NAVD 88.)	Colorado	Sangre de Cristo Mountains	11,574 ft 3528 m	2,229 ft 679 m	14.47 mi 23.3 km	37.5830°N 105.1474°W
237	Leavitt Peak (Note: The elevation of Leavitt Peak includes an adjustment of +1.6 m (5.25 ft) from NGVD 29 to NAVD 88.)	California	Sierra Nevada	11,573 ft 3528 m	2,047 ft 624 m	11.28 mi 18.15 km	38.2862°N 119.6512°W
239	Walker Mountain	California	Sierra Nevada	11,562 ft 3524 m	1,683 ft 513 m	5.08 mi 8.18 km	38.2361°N 119.4730°W
239	Chicoma Mountain (Note: The summit of Chicoma Mountain is the highest point of the Jemez Mountains.)	New Mexico	Jemez Mountains	11,561 ft 3524 m	4,291 ft 1308 m	35.3 mi 56.8 km	36.0073°N 106.3846°W
241	Thirtynine Mile Mountain (Note: The elevation of Thirtynine Mile Mountain includes an adjustment of +1.584 m (5.2 ft) from NGVD 29 to NAVD 88.)	Colorado	South Park Hills	11,553 ft 3521 m	2,088 ft 636 m	10.61 mi 17.08 km	38.8324°N 105.5553°W
242	Mount Ellen (Note: The summit of Mount Ellen is the highest point of the Henry Mountains.) (Note: The elevation of Mount Ellen includes an adjustment of +1.486 m (4.88 ft) from NGVD 29 to NAVD 88.)	Utah	Henry Mountains	11,527 ft 3513 m	5,862 ft 1787 m	56 mi 90.2 km	38.1089°N 110.8136°W
243	Currant Mountain (Note: The summit of Currant Mountain is the highest point of the White Pine Range.)	Nevada	White Pine Range	11,518 ft 3510.7 m	4,575 ft 1394 m	52.8 mi 85 km	38.9097°N 115.4246°W
244	Smiley Mountain	Idaho	Pioneer Mountains	11,511 ft 3508.6 m	2,648 ft 807 m	11.28 mi 18.15 km	43.6994°N 113.8100°W
245	San Gorgonio Mountain (Note: The summit of San Gorgonio Mountain is the highest point of the San Bernardino Mountains.) (Note: The elevation of San Gorgonio Mountain includes an adjustment of +1.303 m (4.27 ft) from NGVD 29 to NAVD 88.)	California	San Bernardino Mountains	11,503 ft 3506 m	8,294 ft 2528 m	162.5 mi 262 km	34.0992°N 116.8249°W
246	Twin Peaks (Note: The elevation of Twin Peaks includes an adjustment of +1.463 m (4.8 ft) from NGVD 29 to NAVD 88.)	Utah	Wasatch Range	11,494 ft 3503 m	3,669 ft 1118 m	11.12 mi 17.89 km	40.5518°N 111.6566°W
247	Kern Peak	California	Sierra Nevada	11,480 ft 3499 m	2,559 ft 780 m	9.53 mi 15.34 km	36.3085°N 118.2876°W
248	Bunker Hill	Nevada	Toiyabe Range	11,477 ft 3498.3 m	2,813 ft 857 m	31.3 mi 50.3 km	39.2529°N 117.1261°W
249	Tomichi Dome (Note: The elevation of Tomichi Dome includes an adjustment of +1.693 m (5.55 ft) from NGVD 29 to NAVD 88.)	Colorado	Sawatch Range	11,471 ft 3496 m	2,325 ft 709 m	9.35 mi 15.04 km	38.4849°N 106.5291°W
250	Sonora Peak (Note: The elevation of Sonora Peak includes an adjustment of +1.62 m (5.31 ft) from NGVD 29 to NAVD 88.)	California	Sierra Nevada	11,467 ft 3495 m	1,818 ft 554 m	4.7 mi 7.57 km	38.3539°N 119.6356°W
251	Blair Mountain (Note: The summit of Blair Mountain is the highest point of the White River Plateau.) (Note: The elevation of Blair Mountain includes an adjustment of +1.565 m (5.13 ft) from NGVD 29 to NAVD 88.)	Colorado	White River Plateau	11,465 ft 3495 m	1,736 ft 529 m	11.5 mi 18.5 km	39.7943°N 107.4176°W
252	Twin Sisters Peaks (Note: The elevation of Twin Sisters Peaks includes an adjustment of +1.388 m (4.55 ft) from NGVD 29 to NAVD 88.)	Colorado	Front Range	11,433 ft 3485 m	2,298 ft 700 m	4.03 mi 6.48 km	40.2886°N 105.5175°W
253	Elk Mountain	Colorado	Rabbit Ears Range	11,424 ft 3482.1 m	2,159 ft 658 m	10.52 mi 16.93 km	40.1619°N 106.1285°W
254	Wyoming Peak (Note: The summit of Wyoming Peak is the highest point of the Wyoming Range.)	Wyoming	Wyoming Range	11,423 ft 3481.6 m	3,558 ft 1084 m	50.8 mi 81.8 km	42.6043°N 110.6238°W
255	Iron Mountain (Note: The elevation of Iron Mountain includes an adjustment of +1.436 m (4.71 ft) from NGVD 29 to NAVD 88.)	Colorado	Sangre de Cristo Range	11,416 ft 3480 m	1,951 ft 595 m	6.95 mi 11.18 km	37.6375°N 105.2538°W
256	Mount Pennell	Utah	Henry Mountains	11,413 ft 3479 m	3,588 ft 1094 m	8.02 mi 12.9 km	37.9564°N 110.7908°W
256	Mount Torbert (Note: The summit of Mount Torbert is the highest point of the Tordrillo Mountains.) (Note: Mount Torbert is the westernmost summit of its elevation in Alaska and greater North America.)	Alaska	Alaska Range	11,413 ft 3479 m	8,688 ft 2648 m	97.7 mi 157.3 km	61.4086°N 152.4125°W
258	Mount Baldy (Note: The summit of Mount Baldy is the highest point of the White Mountains.)	Arizona	White Mountains	11,409 ft 3477.4 m	4,728 ft 1441 m	154 mi 248 km	33.9059°N 109.5626°W
259	Scott Peak (Note: The summit of Scott Peak is the highest point of the Beaverhead Mountains.)	Idaho	Beaverhead Mountains	11,398 ft 3474.2 m	4,243 ft 1293 m	19.56 mi 31.5 km	44.3536°N 112.8211°W
260	Ruby Dome (Note: The summit of Ruby Dome is the highest point of the Ruby Mountains.) (Note: The elevation of Ruby Dome includes an adjustment of +1.429 m (4.69 ft) from NGVD 29 to NAVD 88.)	Nevada	Ruby Mountains	11,392 ft 3472 m	4,810 ft 1466 m	94.7 mi 152.5 km	40.6217°N 115.4754°W
261	Eagle Peak (Note: The elevation of Eagle Peak includes an adjustment of +1.42 m (4.66 ft) from NGVD 29 to NAVD 88.)	Wyoming	Absaroka Range	11,372 ft 3466.1 m	1,867 ft 569 m	8.71 mi 14.02 km	44.3203°N 110.0267°W
262	Toiyabe Dome (Note: The elevation of Toiyabe Dome includes an adjustment of +1.579 m (5.18 ft) from NGVD 29 to NAVD 88.)	Nevada	Toiyabe Range	11,366 ft 3464.4 m	2,101 ft 640 m	5.95 mi 9.58 km	38.7989°N 117.2516°W
263	Abajo Peak (Note: The summit of Abajo Peak is the highest point of the Abajo Mountains.)	Utah	Abajo Mountains	11,362 ft 3463 m	4,555 ft 1388 m	39.9 mi 64.2 km	37.8395°N 109.4624°W
264	Big Creek Peak	Idaho	Lemhi Range	11,355 ft 3461.1 m	2,517 ft 767 m	22.4 mi 36.1 km	44.4717°N 113.5430°W
265	Marcellina Mountain (Note: The elevation of Marcellina Mountain includes an adjustment of +1.658 m (5.44 ft) from NGVD 29 to NAVD 88.)	Colorado	West Elk Mountains	11,353 ft 3461 m	2,728 ft 831 m	5.08 mi 8.18 km	38.9299°N 107.2438°W
266	Bluebell Knoll (Note: The elevation of Bluebell Knoll includes an adjustment of +1.708 m (5.6 ft) from NGVD 29 to NAVD 88.)	Utah	Aquarius Plateau	11,346 ft 3458.1 m	2,930 ft 893 m	32.6 mi 52.5 km	38.1594°N 111.5004°W
267	Circleville Mountain	Utah	Tushar Mountains	11,336 ft 3455.3 m	1,671 ft 509 m	11.05 mi 17.79 km	38.1964°N 112.4020°W
268	Crater Peak (Note: The summit of Crater Peak is the highest point of Grand Mesa.)	Colorado	Front Range	11,333 ft 3454.2 m	2,307 ft 703 m	17.98 mi 28.9 km	39.0396°N 107.6628°W
269	Tumble Mountain (Note: The summit of Tumble Mountain is the highest point of the Lake Plateau.)	Montana	Absaroka Range	11,329 ft 3453 m	2,844 ft 867 m	8.26 mi 13.29 km	45.3227°N 110.0262°W
270	Hilgard Peak (Note: The summit of Hilgard Peak is the highest point of the Madison Range.) (Note: The elevation of Hilgard Peak includes an adjustment of +1.49 m (4.89 ft) from NGVD 29 to NAVD 88.)	Montana	Madison Range	11,321 ft 3451 m	4,063 ft 1238 m	76.4 mi 123 km	44.9166°N 111.4593°W
271	Brian Head (Note: The summit of Brian Head is the highest point of the Markagunt Plateau.) (Note: The elevation of Brian Head includes an adjustment of +1.556 m (5.1 ft) from NGVD 29 to NAVD 88.)	Utah	Markagunt Plateau	11,312 ft 3448 m	3,767 ft 1148 m	42.5 mi 68.5 km	37.6812°N 112.8312°W
272	Hole in the Mountain Peak (Note: The summit of Hole in the Mountain Peak is the highest point of the eastern Humboldt Range.) (Note: The elevation of Hole in the Mountain Peak includes an adjustment of +1.457 m (4.78 ft) from NGVD 29 to NAVD 88.)	Nevada	East Humboldt Range	11,311 ft 3448 m	4,849 ft 1478 m	26.6 mi 42.8 km	40.9508°N 115.1224°W
273	Mount Taylor (Note: The summit of Mount Taylor is the highest point of the northern San Mateo Mountains.)	New Mexico	San Mateo Mountains	11,305 ft 3446 m	4,094 ft 1248 m	86.8 mi 139.6 km	35.2387°N 107.6085°W
273	Castle Peak (Note: The elevation of Castle Peak includes an adjustment of +1.575 m (5.17 ft) from NGVD 29 to NAVD 88.)	Colorado	Sawatch Range	11,305 ft 3446 m	3,040 ft 927 m	16.51 mi 26.6 km	39.7723°N 106.8304°W
275	Mount Grant (Note: The summit of Mount Grant is the highest point of the Wassuk Range.) (Note: The elevation of Mount Grant includes an adjustment of +1.456 m (4.78 ft) from NGVD 29 to NAVD 88.)	Nevada	Wassuk Range	11,305 ft 3445.7 m	3,960 ft 1207 m	28.1 mi 45.2 km	38.5685°N 118.7911°W
276	Troy Peak (Note: The summit of Troy Peak is the highest point of the Grant Range.)	Nevada	Grant Range	11,302 ft 3445 m	4,790 ft 1460 m	40 mi 64.3 km	38.3194°N 115.5019°W
277	Thousand Lake Mountain	Utah	Fish Lake Plateau	11,300 ft 3444.3 m	2,366 ft 721 m	17.81 mi 28.7 km	38.4171°N 111.4793°W
278	South Tent Mountain (Note: The summit of South Tent Mountain is the highest point of the Wasatch Plateau.)	Utah	Wasatch Plateau	11,288 ft 3440.5 m	3,385 ft 1032 m	35.8 mi 57.5 km	39.3922°N 111.3576°W
279	Mount Douglas (Note: The elevation of Mount Douglas includes an adjustment of +1.501 m (4.92 ft) from NGVD 29 to NAVD 88.)	Montana	Absaroka Range	11,287 ft 3440.3 m	1,662 ft 507 m	5.62 mi 9.05 km	45.3068°N 110.1395°W
280	Shelly Mountain (Note: The summit of Shelly Mountain is the highest point of the White Knob Mountains.)	Idaho	White Knob Mountains	11,283 ft 3439.2 m	2,344 ft 714 m	9.71 mi 15.63 km	43.8265°N 113.7263°W
281	North Breccia Cliffs (Note: The elevation of North Breccia Cliffs includes an adjustment of +1.529 m (5.02 ft) from NGVD 29 to NAVD 88.)	Wyoming	Absaroka Range	11,265 ft 3433.6 m	2,120 ft 646 m	6.92 mi 11.14 km	43.7963°N 110.0791°W
282	Redondo Peak	New Mexico	Jemez Mountains	11,258 ft 3431.5 m	2,464 ft 751 m	13.58 mi 21.9 km	35.8720°N 106.5606°W
283	Mount Gerdine	Alaska	Alaska Range	11,257 ft 3431 m	3,005 ft 916 m	11.58 mi 18.63 km	61.5783°N 152.4429°W
284	Mount Hood (Note: The summit of Mount Hood is the highest point of the Oregon Cascades and the U.S. State of Oregon.)	Oregon	Cascade Range	11,249 ft 3428.8 m	7,706 ft 2349 m	57.3 mi 92.2 km	45.3735°N 121.6959°W
285	Prospectors Mountain	Wyoming	Teton Range	11,243 ft 3427 m	1,680 ft 512 m	2.84 mi 4.57 km	43.6493°N 110.8492°W
286	Monroe Peak (Note: The summit of Monroe Peak is the highest point of the Sevier Plateau.)	Utah	Sevier Plateau	11,232 ft 3423.6 m	4,117 ft 1255 m	17.17 mi 27.6 km	38.5361°N 112.0734°W
287	Glenwood Mountain	Utah	Sevier Plateau	11,220 ft 3420 m	1,846 ft 563 m	6.9 mi 11.11 km	38.6253°N 112.0157°W
288	Mount Cowen (Note: The elevation of Mount Cowen includes an adjustment of +1.469 m (4.82 ft) from NGVD 29 to NAVD 88.)	Montana	Absaroka Range	11,217 ft 3418.9 m	2,672 ft 814 m	17.8 mi 28.7 km	45.3892°N 110.4858°W
289	Crazy Peak (Note: The summit of Crazy Peak is the highest point of the Crazy Mountains.) (Note: The elevation of Crazy Peak includes an adjustment of +1.421 m (4.66 ft) from NGVD 29 to NAVD 88.)	Montana	Crazy Mountains	11,214 ft 3417.9 m	5,719 ft 1743 m	44.6 mi 71.8 km	46.0181°N 110.2768°W
290	Two Sisters (Note: The elevation of Two Sisters includes an adjustment of +1.398 m (4.59 ft) from NGVD 29 to NAVD 88.)	Montana	Absaroka Range	11,195 ft 3412 m	1,850 ft 564 m	4.09 mi 6.58 km	45.2634°N 110.0237°W
291	Mount Tom White	Alaska	Chugach Mountains	11,191 ft 3411 m	7,641 ft 2329 m	73 mi 117.6 km	60.6518°N 143.6972°W
292	Hardscrabble Mountain (Note: The elevation of Hardscrabble Mountain includes an adjustment of +1.612 m (5.29 ft) from NGVD 29 to NAVD 88.)	Colorado	Sawatch Range	11,171 ft 3405 m	1,706 ft 520 m	7.03 mi 11.31 km	39.5171°N 106.8021°W
293	Lone Mountain (Note: The elevation of Lone Mountain includes an adjustment of +1.482 m (4.86 ft) from NGVD 29 to NAVD 88.)	Montana	Madison Range	11,167 ft 3403.7 m	2,742 ft 836 m	16.67 mi 26.8 km	45.2783°N 111.4505°W
294	Elk Mountain	Wyoming	Medicine Bow Mountains	11,162 ft 3402.1 m	3,306 ft 1008 m	21.7 mi 35 km	41.6332°N 106.5262°W
295	Tweedy Mountain (Note: The summit of Tweedy Mountain is the highest point of the Pioneer Mountains.) (Note: The elevation of Tweedy Mountain includes an adjustment of +1.598 m (5.24 ft) from NGVD 29 to NAVD 88.)	Montana	Pioneer Mountains	11,159 ft 3401.3 m	3,814 ft 1163 m	75 mi 120.7 km	45.4805°N 112.9655°W
296	Dickey Peak	Idaho	Lost River Range	11,146 ft 3397.3 m	2,823 ft 860 m	4.49 mi 7.22 km	44.2293°N 113.8835°W
297	Cochetopa Dome (Note: The elevation of Cochetopa Dome includes an adjustment of +1.804 m (5.92 ft) from NGVD 29 to NAVD 88.)	Colorado	La Garita Mountains	11,138 ft 3394.8 m	1,762 ft 537 m	6.15 mi 9.9 km	38.2267°N 106.7147°W
298	Waucoba Mountain (Note: The summit of Waucoba Mountain is the highest point of the Inyo Mountains.)	California	Inyo Mountains	11,128 ft 3391.8 m	3,943 ft 1202 m	20 mi 32.2 km	37.0220°N 118.0078°W
298	Glass Mountain (Note: The summit of Glass Mountain is the highest point of the Glass Mountain Ridge.)	California	Glass Mountain Ridge	11,128 ft 3391.8 m	3,210 ft 978 m	16.16 mi 26 km	37.7749°N 118.7085°W
300	North Mamm Peak	Colorado	Front Range	11,126 ft 3391.3 m	3,103 ft 946 m	21.2 mi 34.1 km	39.3865°N 107.8660°W
301	Keynot Peak (Note: The elevation of Keynot Peak includes an adjustment of +1.347 m (4.42 ft) from NGVD 29 to NAVD 88.)	California	Inyo Mountains	11,105 ft 3385 m	3,064 ft 934 m	17.09 mi 27.5 km	36.7076°N 117.9626°W
302	Aiken Peak (Note: The elevation of Aiken Peak includes an adjustment of +1.483 m (4.87 ft) from NGVD 29 to NAVD 88.)	Nevada	Toiyabe Range	11,090 ft 3380.2 m	2,025 ft 617 m	7.34 mi 11.82 km	39.1531°N 117.1740°W
303	Peak 11090	Alaska	Wrangell Mountains	11,089 ft 3380 m	2,989 ft 911 m	18.71 mi 30.1 km	62.0283°N 142.7003°W
304	South Lost River Range high point (Note: The elevation of South Lost River Range high point includes an adjustment of +1.466 m (4.81 ft) from NGVD 29 to NAVD 88.)	Idaho	Lost River Range	11,086 ft 3379 m	3,444 ft 1050 m	9.33 mi 15.02 km	43.9291°N 113.3353°W
305	Provo Peak (Note: The elevation of Provo Peak includes an adjustment of +1.31 m (4.3 ft) from NGVD 29 to NAVD 88.)	Utah	Wasatch Range	11,072 ft 3374.8 m	3,448 ft 1051 m	10.54 mi 16.97 km	40.2443°N 111.5570°W
306	Mount Foresta	Alaska	Saint Elias Mountains	11,050 ft 3368 m	5,400 ft 1646 m	12.51 mi 20.1 km	60.1912°N 139.4323°W
307	Mount Dutton	Utah	Sevier Plateau	11,047 ft 3367.2 m	3,411 ft 1040 m	15.76 mi 25.4 km	38.0206°N 112.2173°W
308	Telescope Peak (Note: The summit of Telescope Peak is the highest point of the Panamint Range.)	California	Panamint Range	11,043 ft 3366 m	6,188 ft 1886 m	57.2 mi 92 km	36.1698°N 117.0892°W
309	Mammoth Mountain (Note: The elevation of Mammoth Mountain includes an adjustment of +1.766 m (5.79 ft) from NGVD 29 to NAVD 88.)	California	Sierra Nevada	11,036 ft 3364 m	1,680 ft 512 m	5.09 mi 8.19 km	37.6305°N 119.0326°W
310	Deseret Peak (Note: The summit of Deseret Peak is the highest point of the Stansbury Mountains.)	Utah	Stansbury Mountains	11,035 ft 3364 m	5,812 ft 1772 m	46 mi 74 km	40.4595°N 112.6264°W
311	Laramie Mountains high point (Note: The elevation of Laramie Mountains high point includes an adjustment of +1.415 m (4.64 ft) from NGVD 29 to NAVD 88.)	Colorado	Laramie Mountains	11,025 ft 3360 m	1,880 ft 573 m	8.54 mi 13.74 km	40.7704°N 105.7162°W
312	Gallatin Peak (Note: The elevation of Gallatin Peak includes an adjustment of +1.52 m (4.99 ft) from NGVD 29 to NAVD 88.)	Montana	Madison Range	11,020 ft 3358.9 m	3,197 ft 974 m	7.46 mi 12 km	45.3682°N 111.3658°W
313	Bridger Peak	Wyoming	Park Range	11,008 ft 3355.3 m	1,904 ft 580 m	25 mi 40.2 km	41.1864°N 107.0319°W
314	Electric Peak (Note: The summit of Electric Peak is the highest point of the Gallatin Range.)	Montana	Gallatin Range	10,997 ft 3351.8 m	3,399 ft 1036 m	30.1 mi 48.5 km	45.0053°N 110.8376°W
314	Mount Grafton	Nevada	Schell Creek Range	10,997 ft 3351.8 m	3,257 ft 993 m	26.8 mi 43.2 km	38.6922°N 114.7424°W
316	Lem Peak	Idaho	Lemhi Range	10,990 ft 3349.8 m	2,485 ft 757 m	26.5 mi 42.7 km	44.7807°N 113.8664°W
317	Garfield Mountain	Montana	Bitterroot Range	10,966 ft 3342.4 m	3,301 ft 1006 m	15.18 mi 24.4 km	44.5204°N 112.6210°W
318	Highland Peak (Note: The summit elevation of Highland Peak includes a vertical offset of +0.61 m (2 ft) from the station benchmark.)	California	Sierra Nevada	10,942 ft 3335 m	2,454 ft 748 m	10.57 mi 17.01 km	38.5437°N 119.7555°W
319	Ward Mountain (Note: The summit of Ward Mountain is the highest point of the Egan Range.)	Nevada	Egan Range	10,941 ft 3334.8 m	3,676 ft 1120 m	18.41 mi 29.6 km	39.1002°N 114.9206°W
320	Rendezvous Peak (Note: The elevation of Rendezvous Peak includes an adjustment of +1.469 m (4.82 ft) from NGVD 29 to NAVD 88.)	Wyoming	Teton Range	10,932 ft 3332 m	1,842 ft 561 m	5.58 mi 8.98 km	43.5673°N 110.9049°W
320	Indian Peak	Wyoming	Absaroka Range	10,931 ft 3332 m	1,703 ft 519 m	5.62 mi 9.04 km	44.7775°N 109.8532°W
322	Emigrant Peak	Montana	Absaroka Range	10,925 ft 3330 m	2,609 ft 795 m	13.86 mi 22.3 km	45.2629°N 110.7071°W
323	Bald Mountain	Utah	Wasatch Range	10,920 ft 3328.3 m	1,713 ft 522 m	2.71 mi 4.36 km	39.8772°N 111.7581°W
324	Sheep Mountain	Idaho	Boulder Mountains	10,913 ft 3326.4 m	2,288 ft 697 m	8.72 mi 14.04 km	44.0646°N 114.3601°W
325	San Antonio Mountain	New Mexico	Tusas Mountains	10,912 ft 3326.1 m	2,118 ft 646 m	19.42 mi 31.3 km	36.8594°N 106.0187°W
326	Shoshone Mountain (Note: The elevation of Shoshone Mountain includes an adjustment of +1.521 m (4.99 ft) from NGVD 29 to NAVD 88.)	Nevada	Toquima Range	10,912 ft 3326 m	2,167 ft 661 m	6 mi 9.65 km	38.6699°N 116.9634°W
326	Mount Fitzpatrick (Note: The summit of Mount Fitzpatrick is the highest point of the Salt River Range.) (Note: The elevation of Mount Fitzpatrick includes an adjustment of +1.483 m (4.87 ft) from NGVD 29 to NAVD 88.)	Wyoming	Salt River Range	10,912 ft 3325.9 m	2,247 ft 685 m	10.68 mi 17.18 km	42.7241°N 110.7764°W
328	Whitewater Baldy (Note: The summit of Whitewater Baldy is the highest point of the Mogollon Mountains.) (Note: The elevation of Whitewater Baldy includes an adjustment of +1.273 m (4.18 ft) from NGVD 29 to NAVD 88.)	New Mexico	Mogollon Mountains	10,899 ft 3322 m	3,545 ft 1081 m	51.6 mi 83.1 km	33.3239°N 108.6423°W
329	Table Mountain (Note: The summit of Table Mountain is the highest point of the Monitor Range.)	Nevada	Monitor Range	10,894 ft 3320.5 m	3,668 ft 1118 m	17.4 mi 28 km	38.8118°N 116.5883°W
330	Freel Peak (Note: The summit of Freel Peak is the highest point of the Carson Range.)	California	Sierra Nevada	10,886 ft 3318 m	3,146 ft 959 m	22.9 mi 36.9 km	38.8575°N 119.9001°W
330	Escudilla Mountain	Arizona	White Mountains	10,886 ft 3318 m	2,382 ft 726 m	24.6 mi 39.6 km	33.9473°N 109.1217°W
332	Sand Mountain North (Note: The summit of Sand Mountain North is the highest point of the Elkhead Mountains.) (Note: The elevation of Sand Mountain North includes an adjustment of +1.502 m (4.93 ft) from NGVD 29 to NAVD 88.)	Colorado	Elkhead Mountains	10,884 ft 3317 m	2,179 ft 664 m	17.7 mi 28.5 km	40.7636°N 107.0575°W
333	Sphinx Mountain (Note: The elevation of Sphinx Mountain includes an adjustment of +1.495 m (4.9 ft) from NGVD 29 to NAVD 88.)	Montana	Madison Range	10,881 ft 3317 m	2,096 ft 639 m	8.21 mi 13.21 km	45.1578°N 111.4792°W
334	Hoback Peak	Wyoming	Wyoming Range	10,867 ft 3312.2 m	2,562 ft 781 m	20.1 mi 32.4 km	43.0845°N 110.5704°W
335	Black Mountain (Note: The elevation of Black Mountain includes an adjustment of +1.537 m (5.04 ft) from NGVD 29 to NAVD 88.)	Colorado	Elkhead Mountains	10,865 ft 3312 m	2,440 ft 744 m	16.4 mi 26.4 km	40.7835°N 107.3691°W
336	Mount Hoffmann	California	Sierra Nevada	10,853 ft 3308 m	2,290 ft 698 m	5.73 mi 9.22 km	37.8468°N 119.5106°W
337	Sleepy Cat Peak (Note: The elevation of Sleepy Cat Peak includes an adjustment of +1.471 m (4.83 ft) from NGVD 29 to NAVD 88.)	Colorado	Flat Tops	10,853 ft 3307.9 m	2,348 ft 716 m	10.64 mi 17.13 km	40.1275°N 107.5338°W
338	Pearl Peak	Nevada	Ruby Mountains	10,852 ft 3307.6 m	3,628 ft 1106 m	13.37 mi 21.5 km	40.2352°N 115.5407°W
339	Matterhorn (Note: The summit of Matterhorn is the highest point of the Jarbidge Mountains.) (Note: The elevation of Matterhorn includes an adjustment of +1.429 m (4.69 ft) from NGVD 29 to NAVD 88.)	Nevada	Jarbidge Mountains	10,843 ft 3305 m	4,688 ft 1429 m	60.4 mi 97.2 km	41.8107°N 115.3745°W
340	Spruce Mountain	Colorado	Grand Mesa	10,838 ft 3303.5 m	1,813 ft 553 m	8.33 mi 13.41 km	39.1973°N 107.5220°W
341	San Jacinto Peak (Note: The summit of San Jacinto Peak is the highest point of the San Jacinto Mountains.)	California	San Jacinto Mountains	10,834 ft 3302.3 m	8,339 ft 2542 m	20.3 mi 32.7 km	33.8147°N 116.6794°W
342	Saddle Mountain	Idaho	Lemhi Range	10,813 ft 3295.8 m	2,385 ft 727 m	11.18 mi 18 km	43.9374°N 112.9544°W
343	Picuris Peak	New Mexico	Sangre de Cristo Range	10,802 ft 3292.5 m	2,261 ft 689 m	9.94 mi 16 km	36.2473°N 105.6549°W
344	West Goat Peak (Note: The summit of West Goat Peak is the highest point of the Anaconda Range.) (Note: The elevation of West Goat Peak includes an adjustment of +1.52 m (4.99 ft) from NGVD 29 to NAVD 88.)	Montana	Anaconda Range	10,798 ft 3291.2 m	3,973 ft 1211 m	39.1 mi 62.9 km	45.9625°N 113.3949°W
345	South Baldy (Note: The summit of South Baldy is the highest point of the Magdalena Mountains.)	New Mexico	Magdalena Mountains	10,787 ft 3288 m	3,813 ft 1162 m	88.1 mi 141.7 km	33.9910°N 107.1879°W
346	Mount Baker (Note: The summit of Mount Baker is the highest point of the northern Cascade Range.) (Note: The elevation of Mount Baker includes an adjustment of +1.43 m (4.69 ft) from NGVD 29 to NAVD 88.)	Washington	Skagit Range	10,786 ft 3287.5 m	8,845 ft 2696 m	131.5 mi 212 km	48.7768°N 121.8145°W
347	Mount McDougal (Note: The elevation of Mount McDougal includes an adjustment of +1.499 m (4.92 ft) from NGVD 29 to NAVD 88.)	Wyoming	Wyoming Range	10,785 ft 3287 m	2,360 ft 719 m	4.58 mi 7.37 km	42.8585°N 110.5920°W
347	Mount Rose (Note: The summit of Mount Rose is the highest point of the Carson Range.)	Nevada	Carson Range	10,785 ft 3287 m	3,630 ft 1106 m	33.2 mi 53.5 km	39.3438°N 119.9179°W
349	Thompson Peak (Note: The summit of Thompson Peak is the highest point of the Sawtooth Range.)	Idaho	Sawtooth Range	10,756 ft 3278.4 m	2,451 ft 747 m	17.77 mi 28.6 km	44.1415°N 115.0100°W
350	Rocky Peak (Note: The elevation of Rocky Peak includes an adjustment of +1.423 m (4.67 ft) from NGVD 29 to NAVD 88.)	Utah	Deep Creek Range	10,753 ft 3277.4 m	1,823 ft 556 m	4.42 mi 7.11 km	39.9116°N 113.8974°W
351	Mount Miller (Note: The summit of Mount Miller is the highest point of Barkley Ridge.)	Alaska	Chugach Mountains	10,750 ft 3277 m	5,300 ft 1615 m	40.3 mi 64.9 km	60.4605°N 142.3012°W
352	Mount Hillers (Note: The elevation of Mount Hillers includes an adjustment of +1.364 m (4.48 ft) from NGVD 29 to NAVD 88.)	Utah	Henry Mountains	10,741 ft 3274 m	3,357 ft 1023 m	7 mi 11.27 km	37.8874°N 110.6970°W
353	Mount Graham (Note: The summit of Mount Graham is the highest point of the Pinaleño Mountains.)	Arizona	Pinaleño Mountains	10,724 ft 3268.6 m	6,340 ft 1932 m	82.4 mi 132.6 km	32.7017°N 109.8714°W
354	Pilot Peak (Note: The summit of Pilot Peak is the highest point of the Pilot Range.)	Nevada	Pilot Range	10,720 ft 3267.6 m	5,731 ft 1747 m	53.7 mi 86.4 km	41.0211°N 114.0774°W
355	Cutoff Mountain (Note: The elevation of Cutoff Mountain includes an adjustment of +1.31 m (4.3 ft) from NGVD 29 to NAVD 88.)	Montana	Absaroka Range	10,702 ft 3262 m	1,755 ft 535 m	5.66 mi 9.11 km	45.0321°N 110.1154°W
356	Loafer Mountain	Utah	Wasatch Range	10,689 ft 3258 m	2,905 ft 885 m	10.22 mi 16.45 km	39.9833°N 111.6237°W
357	Sandia Crest (Note: The summit of Sandia Crest is the highest point of the Sandia Mountains.) (Note: The elevation of Sandia Crest includes an adjustment of +1.101 m (3.61 ft) from NGVD 29 to NAVD 88.)	New Mexico	Sandia Mountains	10,682 ft 3256 m	4,108 ft 1252 m	45.3 mi 72.9 km	35.2101°N 106.4495°W
358	Saddle Mountain	Wyoming	Absaroka Range	10,677 ft 3254.4 m	1,890 ft 576 m	3.98 mi 6.41 km	44.7105°N 109.9838°W
359	Sage Peak (Note: The elevation of Sage Peak includes an adjustment of +1.438 m (4.72 ft) from NGVD 29 to NAVD 88.)	Montana	Madison Range	10,658 ft 3248.5 m	2,073 ft 632 m	10.44 mi 16.8 km	44.9331°N 111.2477°W
360	Mount Evans (Note: The elevation of Mount Evans includes an adjustment of +1.543 m (5.06 ft) from NGVD 29 to NAVD 88.)	Montana	Anaconda Range	10,646 ft 3244.9 m	2,061 ft 628 m	11.55 mi 18.59 km	46.0501°N 113.1903°W
361	Diamond Peak (Note: The summit of Diamond Peak is the highest point of the Diamond Mountains.)	Nevada	Diamond Mountains	10,631 ft 3240.3 m	3,604 ft 1099 m	27.9 mi 44.9 km	39.5849°N 115.8187°W
362	Peak 10630	Alaska	Wrangell Mountains	10,630 ft 3240 m	3,228 ft 984 m	19.07 mi 30.7 km	61.8276°N 142.2456°W
363	Homer Youngs Peak (Note: The summit of Homer Youngs Peak is the highest point of the West Big Hole Mountains.) (Note: The elevation of Homer Youngs Peak includes an adjustment of +1.483 m (4.87 ft) from NGVD 29 to NAVD 88.)	Montana	Bitterroot Range	10,626 ft 3238.8 m	3,201 ft 976 m	35.5 mi 57.2 km	45.3111°N 113.6773°W
364	Flat Top Mountain (Note: The summit of Flat Top Mountain is the highest point of the Oquirrh Mountains.) (Note: The elevation of Flat Top Mountain includes an adjustment of +1.329 m (4.36 ft) from NGVD 29 to NAVD 88.)	Utah	Oquirrh Mountains	10,624 ft 3238.3 m	5,383 ft 1641 m	23.8 mi 38.4 km	40.3724°N 112.1888°W
365	San Pedro Peaks high point (Note: The elevation of San Pedro Peaks high point includes an adjustment of +1.306 m (4.28 ft) from NGVD 29 to NAVD 88.)	New Mexico	Jemez Mountains	10,614 ft 3235.2 m	1,664 ft 507 m	22.1 mi 35.5 km	36.1228°N 106.8139°W
366	South Sheep Mountain (Note: The summit of South Sheep Mountain is the highest point of the Lionshead Mountains.) (Note: The elevation of South Sheep Mountain includes an adjustment of +1.431 m (4.69 ft) from NGVD 29 to NAVD 88.)	Montana	Lionshead Mountains	10,611 ft 3234.1 m	3,676 ft 1120 m	11.12 mi 17.89 km	44.7632°N 111.3906°W
367	Hollowtop Mountain (Note: The summit of Hollowtop Mountain is the highest point of the Tobacco Root Mountains.) (Note: The elevation of Hollowtop Mountain includes an adjustment of +1.486 m (4.88 ft) from NGVD 29 to NAVD 88.)	Montana	Tobacco Root Mountains	10,609 ft 3234 m	3,904 ft 1190 m	34 mi 54.8 km	45.6116°N 112.0083°W
368	Sunset Peak (Note: The summit of Sunset Peak is the highest point of the Snowcrest Range.) (Note: The elevation of Sunset Peak includes an adjustment of +1.553 m (5.1 ft) from NGVD 29 to NAVD 88.)	Montana	Snowcrest Range	10,586 ft 3226.6 m	3,761 ft 1146 m	31.2 mi 50.3 km	44.8559°N 112.1468°W
369	Hogback Mountain (Note: The elevation of Hogback Mountain includes an adjustment of +1.514 m (4.97 ft) from NGVD 29 to NAVD 88.)	Montana	Snowcrest Range	10,585 ft 3226.3 m	1,920 ft 585 m	2.88 mi 4.64 km	44.8944°N 112.1238°W
370	The Thunderer (Note: The elevation of The Thunderer includes an adjustment of +1.26 m (4.13 ft) from NGVD 29 to NAVD 88.)	Wyoming	Absaroka Range	10,558 ft 3218 m	1,734 ft 529 m	5.11 mi 8.22 km	44.9032°N 110.0561°W
371	Black Butte (Note: The summit of Black Butte is the highest point of the Gravelly Range.) (Note: The summit elevation of Black Butte includes a vertical offset of +1 m (3.3 ft) from the station benchmark.)	Montana	Gravelly Range	10,554 ft 3217 m	3,202 ft 976 m	13.2 mi 21.3 km	44.9042°N 111.8550°W
372	Sheep Mountain	Montana	Absaroka Range	10,551 ft 3216 m	1,767 ft 539 m	10.02 mi 16.12 km	45.1131°N 110.7007°W
373	Glacier Peak (Note: The elevation of Glacier Peak includes an adjustment of +1.492 m (4.9 ft) from NGVD 29 to NAVD 88.)	Washington	Cascade Range	10,545 ft 3214 m	7,518 ft 2291 m	56 mi 90.2 km	48.1125°N 121.1138°W
374	Cherry Creek Benchmark (Note: The summit of Cherry Creek Benchmark is the highest point of the Cherry Creek Range.)	Nevada	Cherry Creek Range	10,527 ft 3208.5 m	3,734 ft 1138 m	34.3 mi 55.3 km	39.9662°N 114.8958°W
375	Mount Steller (Note: The summit of Mount Steller is the highest point of Waxell Ridge.)	Alaska	Chugach Mountains	10,515 ft 3205 m	5,365 ft 1635 m	22.5 mi 36.2 km	60.5199°N 143.0932°W
376	Mount Jefferson (Note: The elevation of Mount Jefferson includes an adjustment of +1.388 m (4.55 ft) from NGVD 29 to NAVD 88.)	Oregon	Cascade Range	10,502 ft 3201 m	5,797 ft 1767 m	48.1 mi 77.5 km	44.6743°N 121.7996°W
377	Mount Cleveland (Note: The summit of Mount Cleveland is the highest point of the Lewis Range.)	Montana	Lewis Range	10,479 ft 3194 m	5,246 ft 1599 m	99.4 mi 159.9 km	48.9249°N 113.8482°W
378	Summit Mountain	Nevada	Monitor Range	10,468 ft 3190.7 m	2,721 ft 829 m	29.2 mi 47 km	39.3767°N 116.4620°W
379	Lassen Peak	California	Cascade Range	10,462 ft 3188.7 m	5,229 ft 1594 m	71.4 mi 114.9 km	40.4882°N 121.5050°W
380	White Mountain West (Note: The summit of White Mountain West is the highest point of the Salmon River Mountains.) (Note: The elevation of White Mountain West includes an adjustment of +1.567 m (5.14 ft) from NGVD 29 to NAVD 88.)	Idaho	Salmon River Mountains	10,447 ft 3184.3 m	3,772 ft 1150 m	29.6 mi 47.6 km	44.5749°N 114.4959°W
381	Barronette Peak (Note: The elevation of Barronette Peak includes an adjustment of +1.274 m (4.18 ft) from NGVD 29 to NAVD 88.)	Wyoming	Absaroka Range	10,446 ft 3184 m	2,142 ft 653 m	2.74 mi 4.41 km	44.9755°N 110.0881°W
382	Bromaghin Peak South (Note: The summit of Bromaghin Peak South is the highest point of the Smoky Mountains.) (Note: The elevation of Bromaghin Peak South includes an adjustment of +1.525 m (5 ft) from NGVD 29 to NAVD 88.)	Idaho	Smoky Mountains	10,446 ft 3183.9 m	1,781 ft 543 m	6.86 mi 11.04 km	43.8220°N 114.7131°W
383	Sliderock Mountain (Note: The elevation of Sliderock Mountain includes an adjustment of +1.49 m (4.89 ft) from NGVD 29 to NAVD 88.)	Montana	Snowcrest Range	10,444 ft 3183.3 m	2,259 ft 689 m	4.83 mi 7.77 km	44.9426°N 112.0520°W
384	McAfee Peak (Note: The summit of McAfee Peak is the highest point of the Independence Mountains.) (Note: The summit elevation of McAfee Peak includes a vertical offset of +0.03 m (0.1 ft) from the station benchmark.)	Nevada	Independence Mountains	10,442 ft 3182.8 m	4,168 ft 1270 m	35.6 mi 57.3 km	41.5217°N 115.9734°W
385	Green Mountain	Colorado	Kenosha Mountains	10,427 ft 3178.3 m	1,859 ft 567 m	4.18 mi 6.72 km	39.3053°N 105.3001°W
386	Kendrick Peak	Arizona	Colorado Plateau	10,425 ft 3177.4 m	2,488 ft 758 m	10.66 mi 17.15 km	35.4081°N 111.8510°W
387	Round Top (Note: The summit of Round Top is the highest point of Eldorado National Forest and the Mokelumne Wilderness.)	California	Sierra Nevada	10,384 ft 3165 m	2,539 ft 774 m	13.66 mi 22 km	38.6636°N 120.0006°W
388	Peak 10380	Wyoming	Wyoming Range	10,380 ft 3163.8 m	1,722 ft 525 m	5.2 mi 8.37 km	42.979°N 110.569°W
389	Signal Peak (Note: The summit of Signal Peak is the highest point of the Pine Valley Mountains.) (Note: The elevation of Signal Peak includes an adjustment of +1.249 m (4.1 ft) from NGVD 29 to NAVD 88.)	Utah	Pine Valley Mountains	10,369 ft 3160.5 m	4,505 ft 1373 m	35 mi 56.3 km	37.3195°N 113.4922°W
390	South Sister	Oregon	Cascade Range	10,363 ft 3158.5 m	5,593 ft 1705 m	39.4 mi 63.4 km	44.1035°N 121.7693°W
391	Mount Kimball (Note: The summit of Mount Kimball is the highest point of the Delta Range.)	Alaska	Alaska Range	10,350 ft 3155 m	7,425 ft 2263 m	55.8 mi 89.8 km	63.2390°N 144.6419°W
391	Mount Seattle	Alaska	Saint Elias Mountains	10,350 ft 3155 m	5,561 ft 1695 m	11.97 mi 19.26 km	60.0680°N 139.1893°W
393	Navajo Mountain	Utah	Colorado Plateau	10,348 ft 3154.2 m	4,236 ft 1291 m	58.6 mi 94.3 km	37.0343°N 110.8697°W
394	Cache Peak (Note: The summit of Cache Peak is the highest point of the Albion Range.)	Idaho	Albion Range	10,343 ft 3152.5 m	4,479 ft 1365 m	81.8 mi 131.6 km	42.1856°N 113.6611°W
395	Strawberry Peak (Note: The summit of Strawberry Peak is the highest point of the Roan Cliffs.)	Utah	Roan Cliffs	10,341 ft 3152 m	2,338 ft 713 m	19.46 mi 31.3 km	40.0470°N 110.9847°W
396	West Blue Mountain (Note: The summit of West Blue Mountain is the highest point of the San Mateo Mountains.) (Note: The elevation of West Blue Mountain includes an adjustment of +1.112 m (3.65 ft) from NGVD 29 to NAVD 88.)	New Mexico	San Mateo Mountains	10,340 ft 3152 m	3,146 ft 959 m	26 mi 41.8 km	33.6650°N 107.4458°W
397	Mount Chisholm (Note: The elevation of Mount Chisholm includes an adjustment of +1.532 m (5.03 ft) from NGVD 29 to NAVD 88.)	Montana	Gallatin Range	10,338 ft 3151 m	2,018 ft 615 m	14.57 mi 23.5 km	45.4037°N 110.9300°W
398	The Moose's Tooth	Alaska	Alaska Range	10,335 ft 3150 m	3,385 ft 1032 m	7.11 mi 11.45 km	62.9691°N 150.6144°W
399	The General	Idaho	Salmon River Mountains	10,333 ft 3149.5 m	1,909 ft 582 m	16.42 mi 26.4 km	44.4836°N 114.8031°W
400	Mount Leidy	Wyoming	Gros Ventre Range	10,328 ft 3148 m	1,804 ft 550 m	7.42 mi 11.94 km	43.7252°N 110.4059°W
401	Sherman Mountain	Nevada	Ruby Mountains	10,324 ft 3146.9 m	1,740 ft 530 m	5.85 mi 9.41 km	40.1191°N 115.5865°W
402	North Shoshone Peak (Note: The summit of North Shoshone Peak is the highest point of the Shoshone Mountains.)	Nevada	Shoshone Mountains	10,318 ft 3144.9 m	2,853 ft 870 m	14.93 mi 24 km	39.1504°N 117.4800°W
402	Bald Mountain	Idaho	Salmon River Mountains	10,318 ft 3144.9 m	2,013 ft 614 m	16.18 mi 26 km	44.3672°N 114.3441°W
404	Mount Sheridan (Note: The summit of Mount Sheridan is the highest point of the Red Mountains.)	Wyoming	Red Mountains	10,313 ft 3143.4 m	2,318 ft 707 m	20.6 mi 33.2 km	44.2662°N 110.5293°W
405	Fan Mountain (Note: The elevation of Fan Mountain includes an adjustment of +1.42 m (4.66 ft) from NGVD 29 to NAVD 88.)	Montana	Madison Range	10,312 ft 3143 m	2,687 ft 819 m	3.82 mi 6.15 km	45.2980°N 111.5238°W
406	Laramie Peak	Wyoming	Laramie Mountains	10,276 ft 3132 m	3,317 ft 1011 m	67.4 mi 108.4 km	42.2681°N 105.4425°W
407	Windy Mountain	Wyoming	Absaroka Range	10,267 ft 3129.3 m	2,042 ft 622 m	11.3 mi 18.19 km	44.7914°N 109.5928°W
407	Spruce Mountain (Note: The summit of Spruce Mountain is the highest point of the Pequop Mountains.)	Nevada	Pequop Mountains	10,267 ft 3129.3 m	3,939 ft 1201 m	27.1 mi 43.6 km	40.5521°N 114.8217°W
409	Columbus Mountain (Note: The elevation of Columbus Mountain includes an adjustment of +1.378 m (4.52 ft) from NGVD 29 to NAVD 88.)	Colorado	Elkhead Mountains	10,258 ft 3126 m	1,913 ft 583 m	7.68 mi 12.36 km	40.8799°N 107.1921°W
410	Morey Peak (Note: The summit of Morey Peak is the highest point of the Hot Creek Range.)	Nevada	Hot Creek Range	10,251 ft 3124.4 m	2,586 ft 788 m	20.6 mi 33.2 km	38.6276°N 116.2880°W
411	Mount Washburn	Wyoming	Gallatin Range	10,249 ft 3123.8 m	2,333 ft 711 m	19.94 mi 32.1 km	44.7977°N 110.4339°W
412	Alegres Mountain (Note: The elevation of Alegres Mountain includes an adjustment of +1.078 m (3.54 ft) from NGVD 29 to NAVD 88.)	New Mexico	Colorado Plateau	10,240 ft 3121 m	2,379 ft 725 m	54.5 mi 87.7 km	34.1575°N 108.1894°W
413	Potato Peak (Note: The summit of Potato Peak is the highest point of the Bodie Mountains.)	California	Bodie Mountains	10,236 ft 3120 m	2,556 ft 779 m	13.5 mi 21.7 km	38.2346°N 119.0869°W
414	Vienna Benchmark (Note: The summit elevation of Vienna Benchmark includes a vertical offset of +0.914 m (3 ft) from the station benchmark.)	Idaho	Smoky Mountains	10,232 ft 3118.8 m	1,764 ft 538 m	6.7 mi 10.78 km	43.8506°N 114.8534°W
415	Table Mountain (Note: The summit of Table Mountain is the highest point of the Highland Mountains.) (Note: The elevation of Table Mountain includes an adjustment of +1.467 m (4.81 ft) from NGVD 29 to NAVD 88.)	Montana	Highland Mountains	10,228 ft 3117.4 m	4,422 ft 1348 m	19.3 mi 31.1 km	45.7426°N 112.4619°W
416	Mine Camp Peak (Note: The summit of Mine Camp Peak is the highest point of the Pavant Range.) (Note: The elevation of Mine Camp Peak includes an adjustment of +1.418 m (4.65 ft) from NGVD 29 to NAVD 88.)	Utah	Pavant Range	10,227 ft 3117.1 m	3,001 ft 915 m	20.1 mi 32.3 km	38.8737°N 112.2534°W
417	Two Ocean Mountain	Wyoming	Yellowstone Plateau	10,221 ft 3115.5 m	2,086 ft 636 m	9.77 mi 15.72 km	44.0964°N 110.1516°W
418	Mount Hancock	Wyoming	Yellowstone Plateau	10,219 ft 3114.6 m	1,794 ft 547 m	9.46 mi 15.22 km	44.1553°N 110.4174°W
419	Mount Jefferson (Note: The summit of Mount Jefferson is the highest point of the Centennial Mountains.) (Note: Mount Jefferson lies on the Continental Divide between Idaho and Montana.)	Idaho; Montana	Bitterroot Range	10,216 ft 3113.7 m	3,383 ft 1031 m	11.2 mi 18.02 km	44.5620°N 111.5049°W
420	Capitan Mountains high point (Note: The elevation of Capitan Mountains high point includes an adjustment of +0.963 m (3.16 ft) from NGVD 29 to NAVD 88.)	New Mexico	Capitan Mountains	10,204 ft 3110 m	3,271 ft 997 m	28.1 mi 45.2 km	33.6013°N 105.3436°W
421	Mount Bertha	Alaska	Saint Elias Mountains	10,203 ft 3110 m	3,455 ft 1053 m	3.52 mi 5.67 km	58.6866°N 137.0271°W
422	Redoubt Volcano (Note: The summit of Redoubt Volcano is the highest point of the Chigmit Mountains.) (Note: Redoubt Volcano is the westernmost summit of its elevation in Alaska and greater North America.)	Alaska	Chigmit Mountains	10,197 ft 3108.1 m	9,147 ft 2788 m	58.7 mi 94.5 km	60.4854°N 152.7442°W
423	Spanish Fork Peak	Utah	Wasatch Range	10,196 ft 3107.6 m	2,972 ft 906 m	8.83 mi 14.21 km	40.0879°N 111.5277°W
424	Mount Regan (Note: The elevation of Mount Regan includes an adjustment of +1.587 m (5.21 ft) from NGVD 29 to NAVD 88.)	Idaho	Sawtooth Range	10,195 ft 3108 m	1,730 ft 527 m	1.9 mi 3.06 km	44.1598°N 115.0616°W
425	Mount Callaghan	Nevada	Toiyabe Range	10,195 ft 3107.4 m	3,047 ft 929 m	24.5 mi 39.4 km	39.7094°N 116.9508°W
426	Quinn Canyon Range high point (Note: The elevation of Quinn Canyon Range high point includes an adjustment of +1.292 m (4.24 ft) from NGVD 29 to NAVD 88.)	Nevada	Quinn Canyon Range	10,193 ft 3106.9 m	2,606 ft 794 m	15.55 mi 25 km	38.1223°N 115.7086°W
427	Bruin Point	Utah	Roan Cliffs	10,187 ft 3105 m	2,724 ft 830 m	42.9 mi 69.1 km	39.6442°N 110.3482°W
428	Mount Powell (Note: The summit of Mount Powell is the highest point of the Flint Creek Range.)	Montana	Flint Creek Range	10,173 ft 3100.7 m	3,746 ft 1142 m	19 mi 30.6 km	46.3499°N 112.9798°W
429	McKnight Mountain (Note: The summit of McKnight Mountain is the highest point of the Black Range.) (Note: The elevation of McKnight Mountain includes an adjustment of +1.193 m (3.91 ft) from NGVD 29 to NAVD 88.)	New Mexico	Black Range	10,169 ft 3099.5 m	2,545 ft 776 m	42 mi 67.6 km	33.0518°N 107.8503°W
430	Trapper Peak (Note: The summit of Trapper Peak is the highest point of the central Bitterroot Range.) (Note: The elevation of Trapper Peak includes an adjustment of +1.367 m (4.48 ft) from NGVD 29 to NAVD 88.)	Montana	Bitterroot Range	10,162 ft 3097 m	3,570 ft 1088 m	40.8 mi 65.6 km	45.8898°N 114.2978°W
431	Mount Stimson	Montana	Lewis Range	10,146 ft 3092.6 m	4,402 ft 1342 m	30 mi 48.3 km	48.5142°N 113.6104°W
432	Roberts Creek Mountain	Nevada	Roberts Mountains	10,132 ft 3088.1 m	3,584 ft 1092 m	32.3 mi 52.1 km	39.8699°N 116.3106°W
433	Mount Withington	New Mexico	San Mateo Mountains	10,122 ft 3085.3 m	2,335 ft 712 m	15.04 mi 24.2 km	33.8806°N 107.4860°W
434	Kintla Peak (Note: The summit of Kintla Peak is the highest point of the Livingston Range.) (Note: The elevation of Kintla Peak includes an adjustment of +1.413 m (4.64 ft) from NGVD 29 to NAVD 88.)	Montana	Livingston Range	10,106 ft 3080 m	4,401 ft 1341 m	14.78 mi 23.8 km	48.9437°N 114.1714°W
435	Manzano Peak (Note: The summit of Manzano Peak is the highest point of the Manzano Mountains.)	New Mexico	Manzano Mountains	10,100 ft 3078.5 m	3,248 ft 990 m	42.2 mi 67.9 km	34.5910°N 106.4468°W
436	Ute Mountain (Note: The elevation of Ute Mountain includes an adjustment of +1.288 m (4.23 ft) from NGVD 29 to NAVD 88.)	New Mexico	Taos Mountains	10,097 ft 3077.6 m	2,488 ft 758 m	10.75 mi 17.3 km	36.9376°N 105.6841°W
437	Smoky Dome (Note: The summit of Smoky Dome is the highest point of the Soldier Mountains.)	Idaho	Soldier Mountains	10,096 ft 3077.4 m	3,275 ft 998 m	16.98 mi 27.3 km	43.4933°N 114.9362°W
438	North Sister	Oregon	Cascade Range	10,089 ft 3075 m	2,726 ft 831 m	4.25 mi 6.84 km	44.1666°N 121.7723°W
439	Mount McGuire (Note: The summit of Mount McGuire is the highest point of the Bighorn Crags.)	Idaho	Salmon River Mountains	10,087 ft 3074.6 m	3,542 ft 1080 m	39.7 mi 64 km	45.1742°N 114.6021°W
440	Ferris Mountain (Note: The summit of Ferris Mountain is the highest point of the Ferris Mountains.)	Wyoming	Ferris Mountains	10,071 ft 3069.6 m	3,282 ft 1000 m	55.3 mi 89 km	42.2566°N 107.2394°W
441	Mount San Antonio (Note: The summit of Mount San Antonio is the highest point of the San Gabriel Mountains.) (Note: The elevation of Mount San Antonio includes an adjustment of +1.214 m (3.98 ft) from NGVD 29 to NAVD 88.)	California	San Gabriel Mountains	10,068 ft 3069 m	6,244 ft 1903 m	42.5 mi 68.4 km	34.2891°N 117.6463°W
442	Mount Jackson (Note: The elevation of Mount Jackson includes an adjustment of +1.425 m (4.68 ft) from NGVD 29 to NAVD 88.)	Montana	Lewis Range	10,057 ft 3065.3 m	3,406 ft 1038 m	7.88 mi 12.68 km	48.6006°N 113.7226°W
443	Becky Peak (Note: The elevation of Becky Peak includes an adjustment of +1.306 m (4.28 ft) from NGVD 29 to NAVD 88.)	Nevada	Schell Creek Range	10,027 ft 3056.3 m	2,434 ft 742 m	15.56 mi 25 km	39.9718°N 114.6029°W
444	Hawkins Peak	California	Sierra Nevada	10,026 ft 3056 m	2,142 ft 653 m	5.96 mi 9.59 km	38.7386°N 119.8725°W
445	Haleakalā (Note: The summit of Haleakalā is the highest point of the Island of Maui and the westernmost 3,000 meters (9,800 feet) summit of the United States.)	Hawaii	Island of Maui	10,023 ft 3055 m	10,023 ft 3055 m	76.3 mi 122.9 km	20.7097°N 156.2533°W
446	Mount Siyeh (Note: The elevation of Mount Siyeh includes an adjustment of +1.435 m (4.71 ft) from NGVD 29 to NAVD 88.)	Montana	Lewis Range	10,019 ft 3053.7 m	3,106 ft 947 m	9.45 mi 15.21 km	48.7286°N 113.6499°W
447	Iliamna Volcano (Note: Iliamna Volcano is the westernmost 3000-meter (9843-foot) summit of Alaska and greater North America.)	Alaska	Chigmit Mountains	10,016 ft 3053 m	7,866 ft 2398 m	33.6 mi 54.1 km	60.0321°N 153.0915°W
447	Kates Needle	Alaska; British Columbia	Coast Mountains	10,016 ft 3053 m	4,537 ft 1383 m	26 mi 41.8 km	57.0449°N 132.0451°W
449	Mount Merritt (Note: The elevation of Mount Merritt includes an adjustment of +1.372 m (4.5 ft) from NGVD 29 to NAVD 88.)	Montana	Lewis Range	10,009 ft 3050.6 m	2,904 ft 885 m	4.71 mi 7.58 km	48.8702°N 113.7866°W
450	Salt Benchmark (Note: The summit of Salt Benchmark is the highest point of the San Pitch Mountains.)	Utah	San Pitch Mountains	10,001 ft 3048.4 m	3,697 ft 1127 m	10.13 mi 16.3 km	39.6649°N 111.7432°W
451	Shay Mountain (Note: The elevation of Shay Mountain includes an adjustment of +1.249 m (4.1 ft) from NGVD 29 to NAVD 88.)	Utah	Abajo Mountains	9,993 ft 3045.9 m	1,649 ft 503 m	6.19 mi 9.96 km	37.9355°N 109.5489°W
452	El Capitan (Note: The elevation of El Capitan includes an adjustment of +1.251 m (4.1 ft) from NGVD 29 to NAVD 88.)	Montana	Bitterroot Range	9,987 ft 3044 m	1,978 ft 603 m	9.43 mi 15.17 km	46.0074°N 114.3970°W
452	Pyramid Peak	California	Sierra Nevada	9,987 ft 3044 m	2,582 ft 787 m	12.19 mi 19.61 km	38.8451°N 120.1581°W
454	Ute Peak (Note: The summit of Ute Peak is the highest point of Ute Mountain.)	Colorado	Ute Mountain	9,984 ft 3043 m	4,039 ft 1231 m	34.3 mi 55.2 km	37.2841°N 108.7787°W
454	Naomi Peak (Note: The summit of Naomi Peak is the highest point of the Bear River Mountains.)	Utah	Wasatch Range	9,984 ft 3043 m	3,169 ft 966 m	61.5 mi 98.9 km	41.9114°N 111.6754°W
456	Peak 9980 (Note: The elevation of Peak 9980 includes an adjustment of +1.369 m (4.49 ft) from NGVD 29 to NAVD 88.)	California	Sierra Nevada	9,980 ft 3042 m	1,660 ft 506 m	23.5 mi 37.8 km	35.9316°N 118.3315°W
457	Desatoya Peak (Note: The summit of Desatoya Peak is the highest point of the Desatoya Mountains.)	Nevada	Desatoya Mountains	9,979 ft 3041.7 m	3,545 ft 1081 m	21.1 mi 33.9 km	39.3652°N 117.7591°W
458	Observation Peak	Wyoming	Snake River Range	9,974 ft 3040 m	2,480 ft 756 m	9.11 mi 14.66 km	43.2840°N 110.9498°W
459	Mount Augusta (Note: The summit of Mount Augusta is the highest point of the Clan Alpine Mountains.)	Nevada	Clan Alpine Mountains	9,970 ft 3038.9 m	4,386 ft 1337 m	14.8 mi 23.8 km	39.5399°N 117.9195°W
460	Mount Gannett	Alaska	Chugach Mountains	9,967 ft 3038 m	4,400 ft 1341 m	9.11 mi 14.66 km	61.2420°N 148.1965°W
460	Major Benchmark West	Nevada	Schell Creek Range	9,967 ft 3038 m	2,165 ft 660 m	14.37 mi 23.1 km	38.9052°N 114.6286°W
462	Meade Peak (Note: The summit of Meade Peak is the highest point of the Preuss Range.)	Idaho	Preuss Range	9,963 ft 3036.8 m	2,497 ft 761 m	23.5 mi 37.7 km	42.4954°N 111.2490°W
463	Sugarloaf Mountain	California	San Bernardino Mountains	9,954 ft 3034 m	1,952 ft 595 m	4.76 mi 7.66 km	34.1990°N 116.8147°W
464	Horse Mountain (Note: The elevation of Horse Mountain includes an adjustment of +1.461 m (4.79 ft) from NGVD 29 to NAVD 88.)	Colorado	San Juan Mountains	9,952 ft 3033.3 m	1,887 ft 575 m	13.06 mi 21 km	37.3080°N 107.2864°W
465	Goat Mountain	Idaho	Beaverhead Mountains	9,948 ft 3032.2 m	2,283 ft 696 m	16.44 mi 26.5 km	44.8234°N 113.4388°W
466	Pinyon Peak	Idaho	Salmon River Mountains	9,946 ft 3031.5 m	2,002 ft 610 m	8.21 mi 13.21 km	44.5697°N 114.9168°W
467	Bull Mountain (Note: The summit of Bull Mountain is the highest point of the Raft River Mountains.) (Note: The elevation of Bull Mountain includes an adjustment of +1.343 m (4.41 ft) from NGVD 29 to NAVD 88.)	Utah	Raft River Mountains	9,938 ft 3029.2 m	3,754 ft 1144 m	24.3 mi 39.2 km	41.9100°N 113.3659°W
468	Raft River Peak	Utah	Raft River Mountains	9,931 ft 3027 m	3,740 ft 1140 m	23.9 mi 38.5 km	41.9048°N 113.3888°W
469	Hayford Peak (Note: The summit of Hayford Peak is the highest point of the Sheep Range.)	Nevada	Sheep Range	9,924 ft 3024.9 m	5,412 ft 1650 m	33.8 mi 54.3 km	36.6577°N 115.2008°W
470	Baldy Mountain (Note: The elevation of Baldy Mountain includes an adjustment of +1.436 m (4.71 ft) from NGVD 29 to NAVD 88.)	Montana	Bitterroot Range	9,905 ft 3019 m	2,360 ft 719 m	18.08 mi 29.1 km	44.5684°N 111.8709°W
471	Rainbow Peak (Note: The elevation of Rainbow Peak includes an adjustment of +1.362 m (4.47 ft) from NGVD 29 to NAVD 88.)	Montana	Livingston Range	9,895 ft 3016 m	3,636 ft 1108 m	5.62 mi 9.05 km	48.8786°N 114.0974°W
471	Eagle Peak (Note: The summit of Eagle Peak is the highest point of the Warner Mountains.)	California	Warner Mountains	9,895 ft 3016 m	4,362 ft 1330 m	87.4 mi 140.6 km	41.2835°N 120.2007°W
473	Sleeping Deer Mountain	Idaho	Salmon River Mountains	9,887 ft 3013.6 m	1,861 ft 567 m	15.75 mi 25.3 km	44.7672°N 114.6913°W
474	Owl Creek Mountains high point	Wyoming	Owl Creek Mountains	9,879 ft 3011 m	2,175 ft 663 m	15.1 mi 24.3 km	43.5998°N 108.7955°W
475	Dry Mountain (Note: The elevation of Dry Mountain includes an adjustment of +1.222 m (4.01 ft) from NGVD 29 to NAVD 88.)	Utah	Wasatch Range	9,869 ft 3008.1 m	1,845 ft 562 m	4.59 mi 7.39 km	39.9406°N 111.7316°W
476	Taylor Mountain (Note: Taylor Mountain lies on the Continental Divide between Idaho and Montana.)	Idaho; Montana	Bitterroot Range	9,860 ft 3005.2 m	1,880 ft 573 m	8.79 mi 14.15 km	44.5616°N 111.6830°W
477	Sacajawea Peak (Oregon) (Note: The summit of Sacajawea Peak (Oregon) is the highest point of the Wallowa Mountains and the Columbia Plateau.) (Note: The elevation of Sacajawea Peak (Oregon) includes an adjustment of +1.56 m (5.12 ft) from NGVD 29 to NAVD 88.)	Oregon	Wallowa Mountains	9,843 ft 3000 m	6,393 ft 1949 m	125.5 mi 202 km	45.2450°N 117.2929°W

== Gallery ==
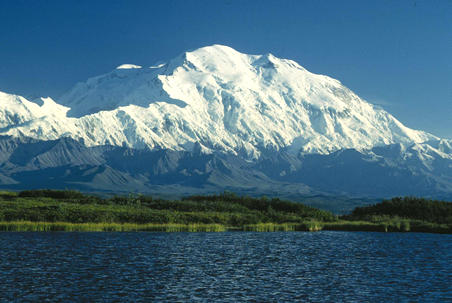
1. Denali in Alaska is the highest summit of the United States and all of North America.

2. Mount Saint Elias is the second highest summit of both Canada and the United States.

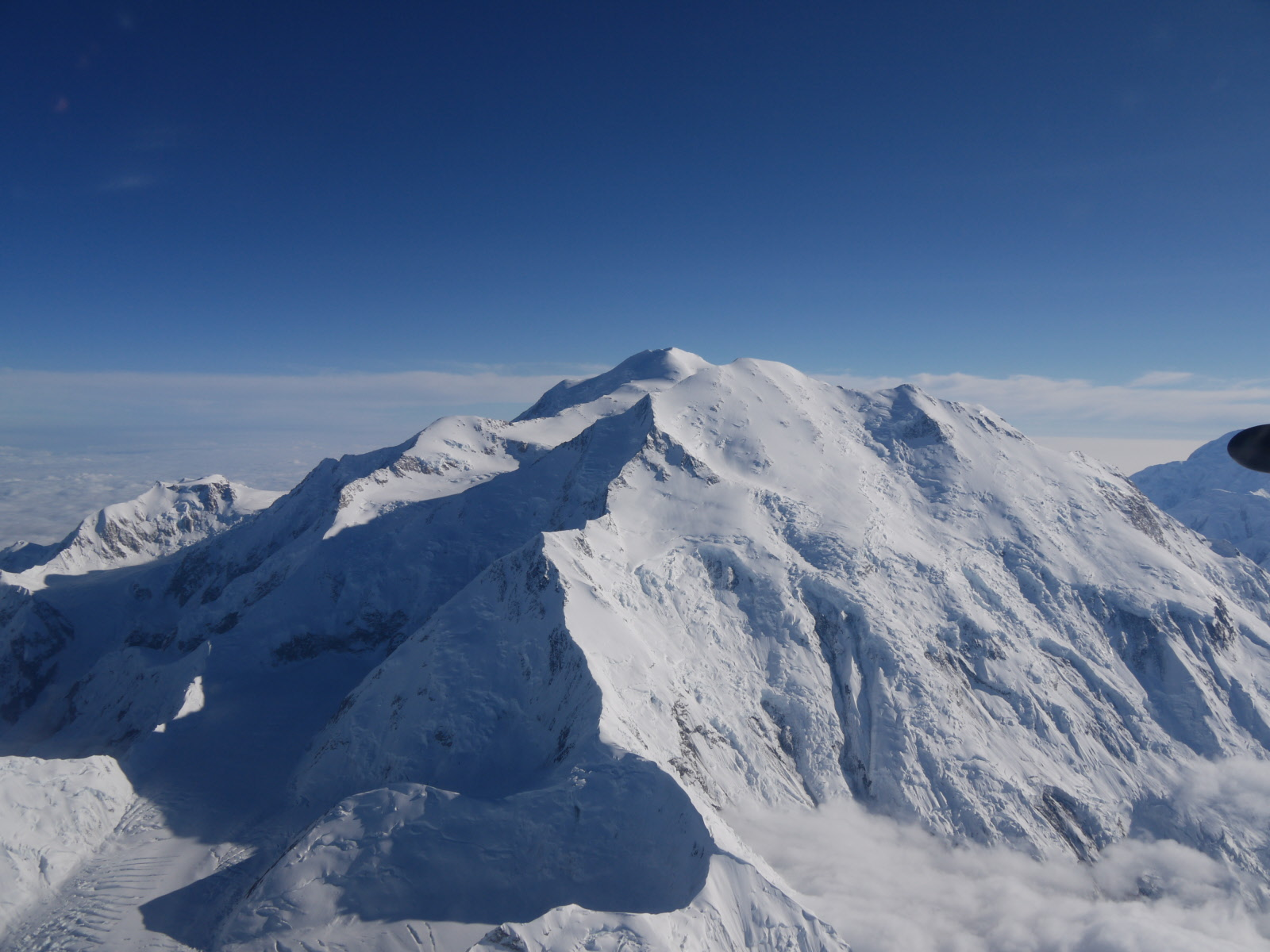
3. Mount Foraker is the second highest major summit of the Alaska Range.

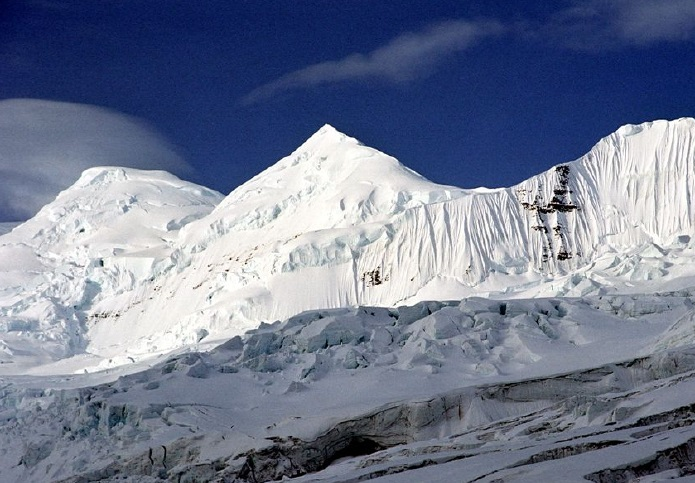
4. Mount Bona in Alaska is the highest volcano in the United States.

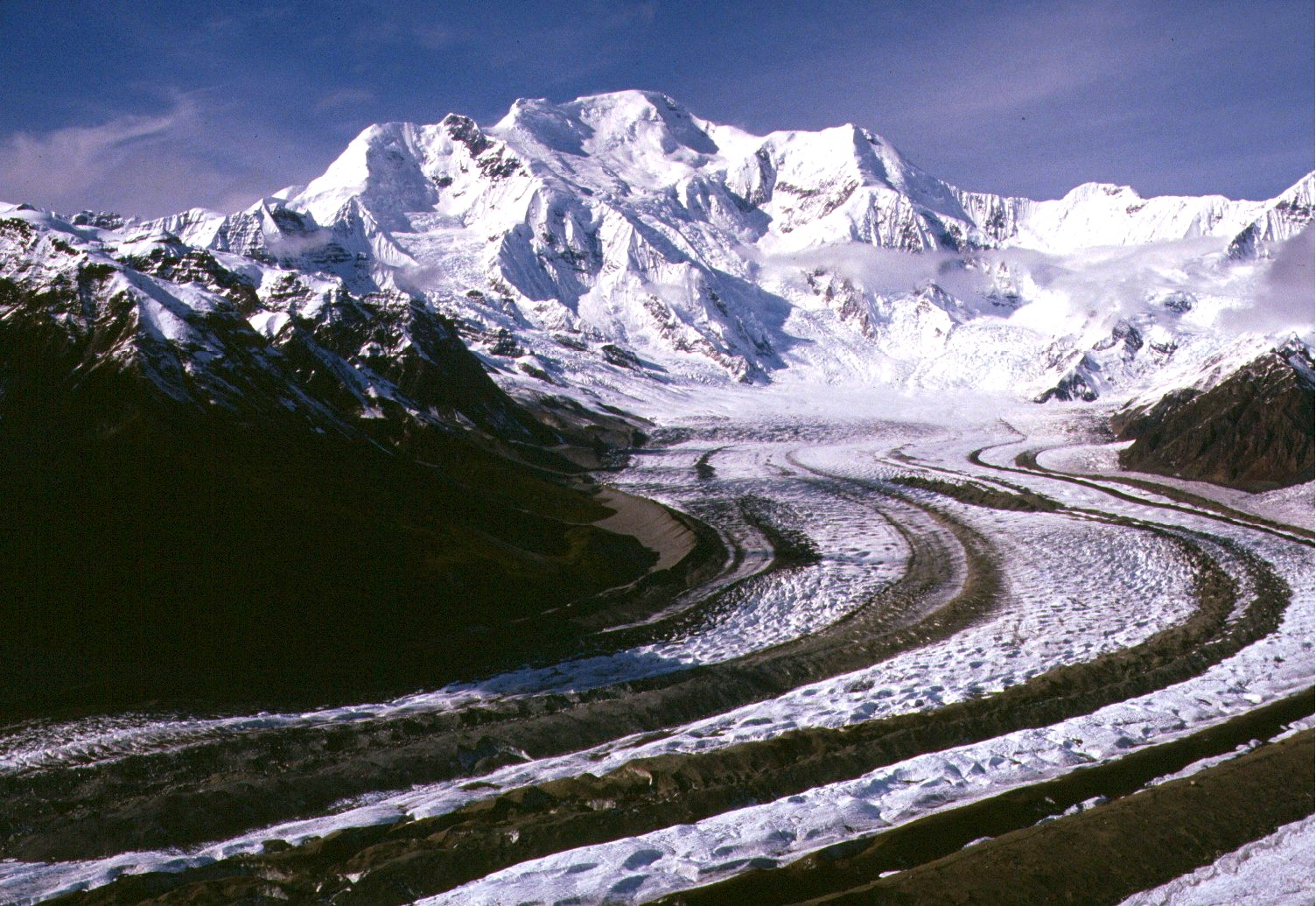
5. Mount Blackburn in Alaska is the highest summit of the Wrangell Mountains.

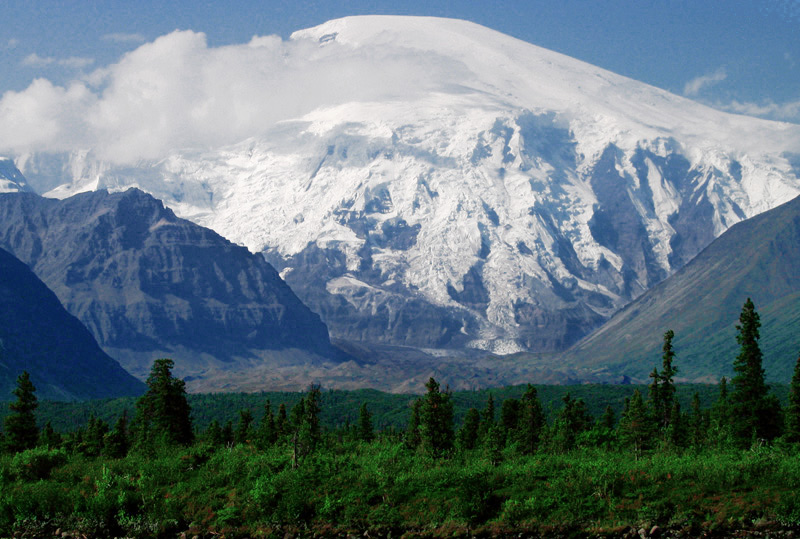
6. Mount Sanford in Alaska is the third highest volcano in the United States.

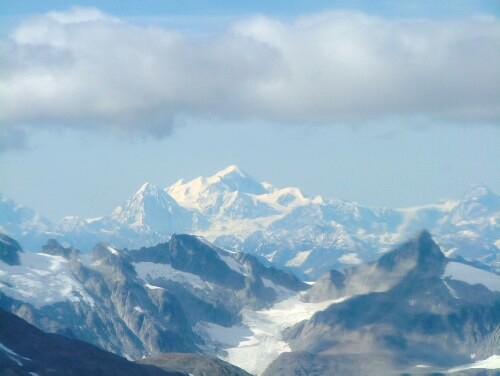
7. Mount Fairweather lies on the Alaska-British Columbia international border.

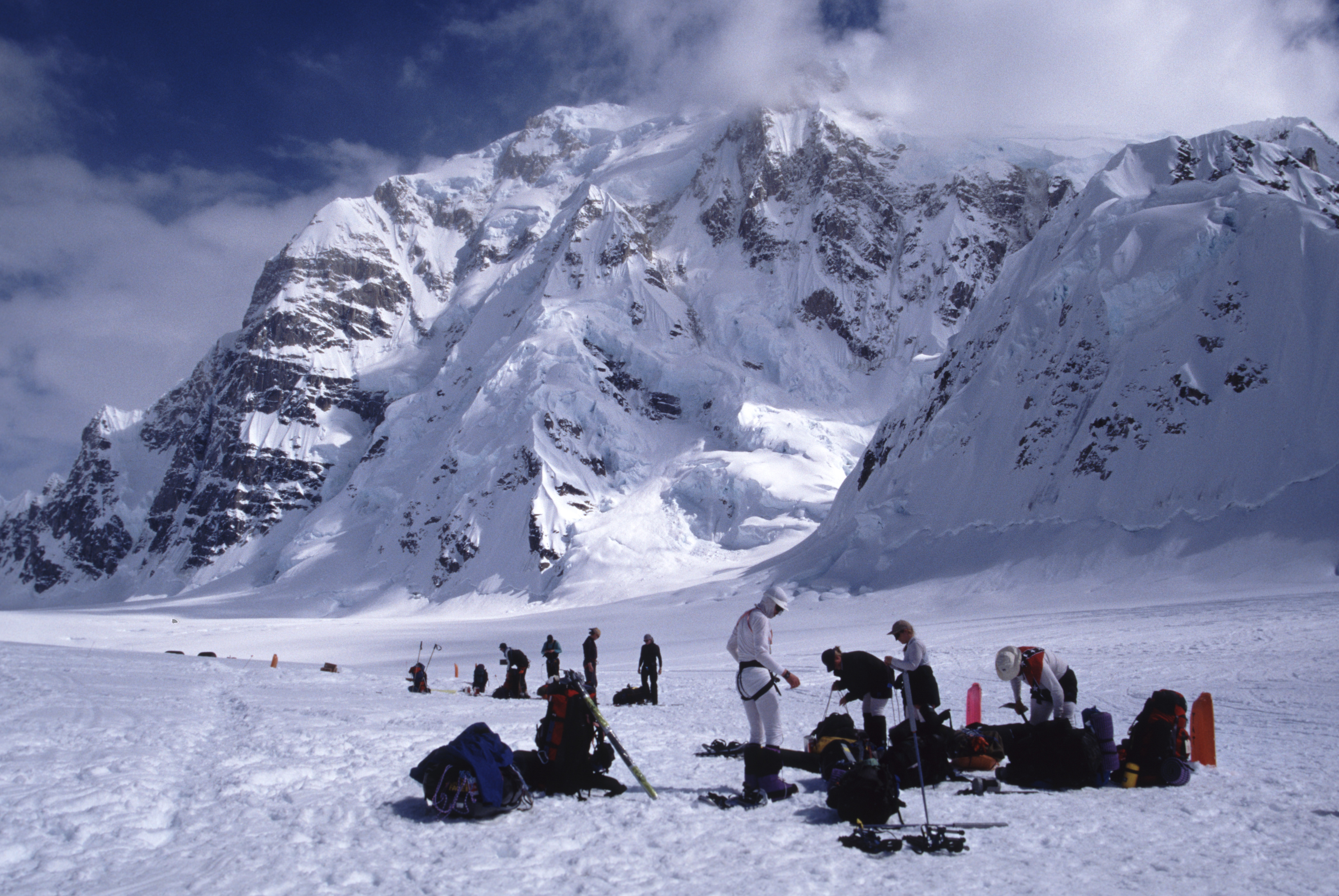
10. Mount Hunter is the third highest major summit of the Alaska Range.

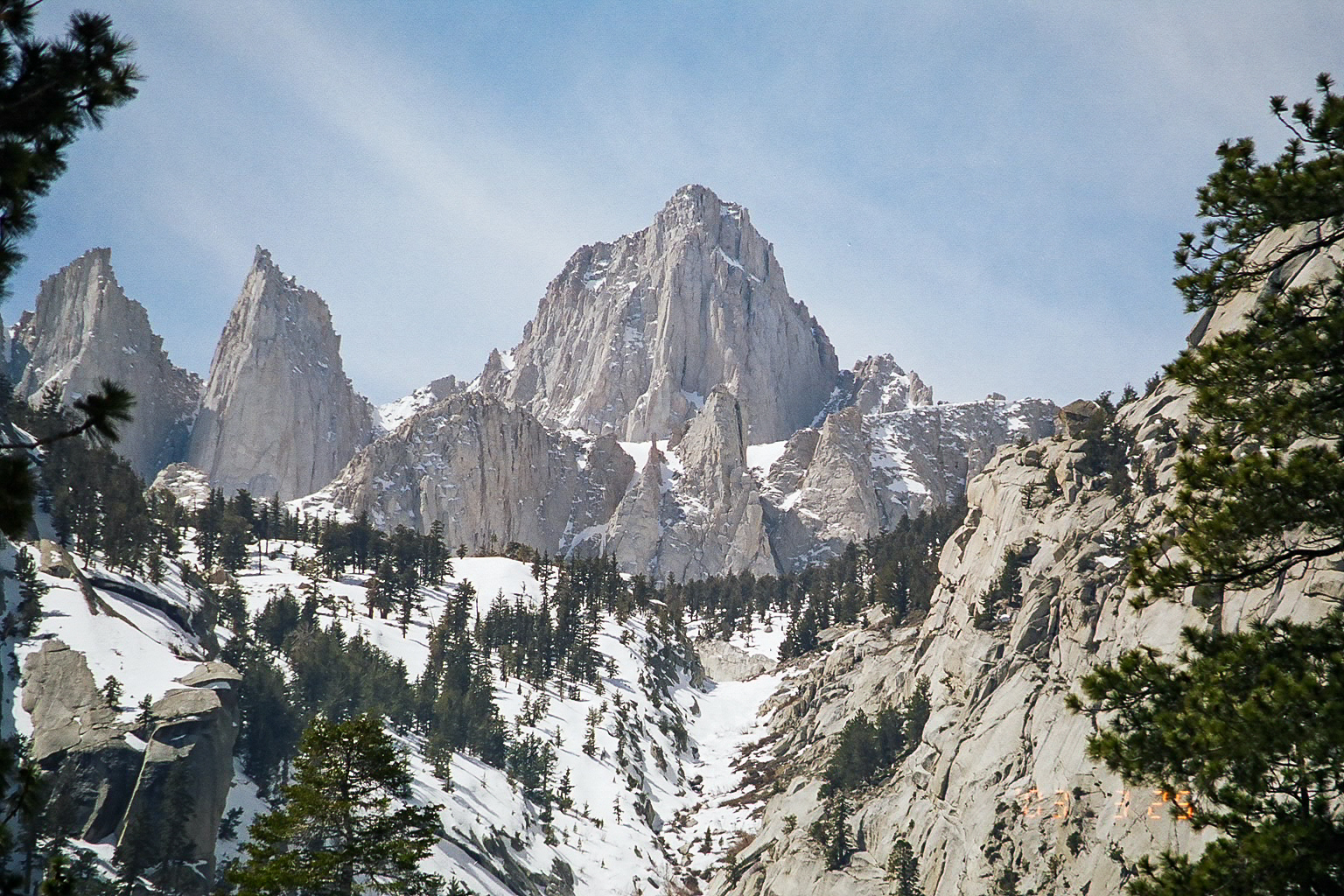
11. Mount Whitney highest summit of the Sierra Nevada and California.

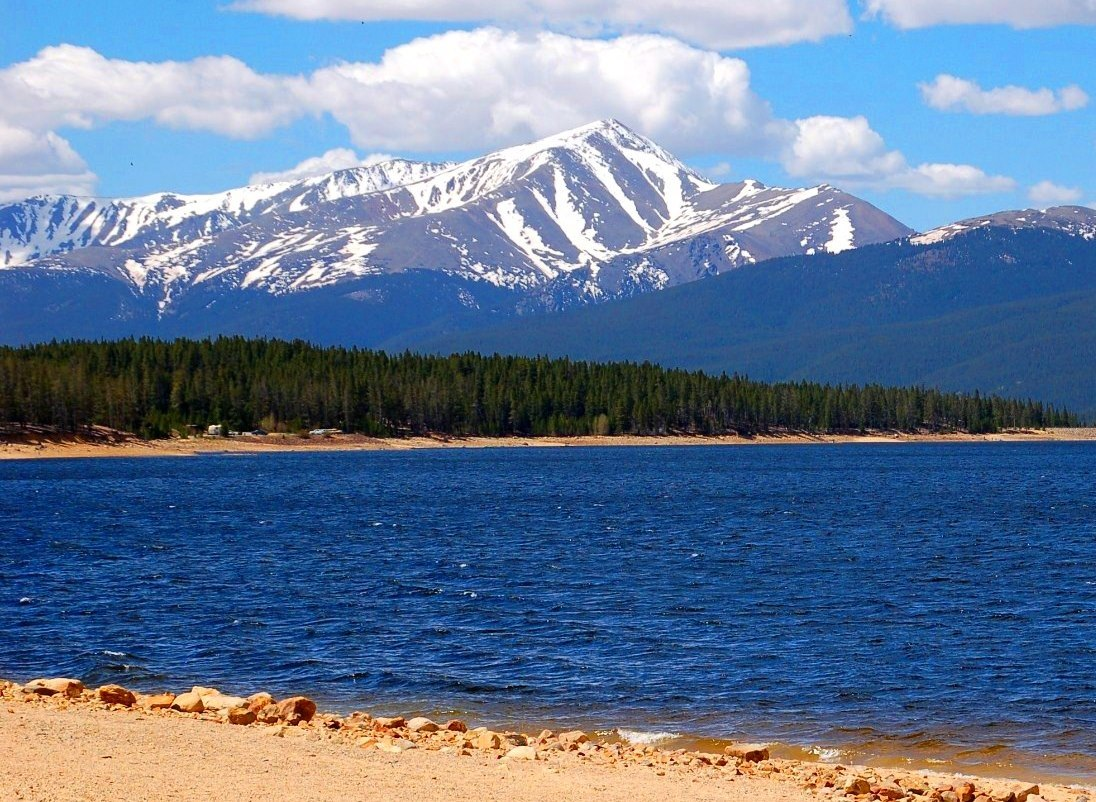
14. Mount Elbert is the highest summit of Colorado and the Rocky Mountains.

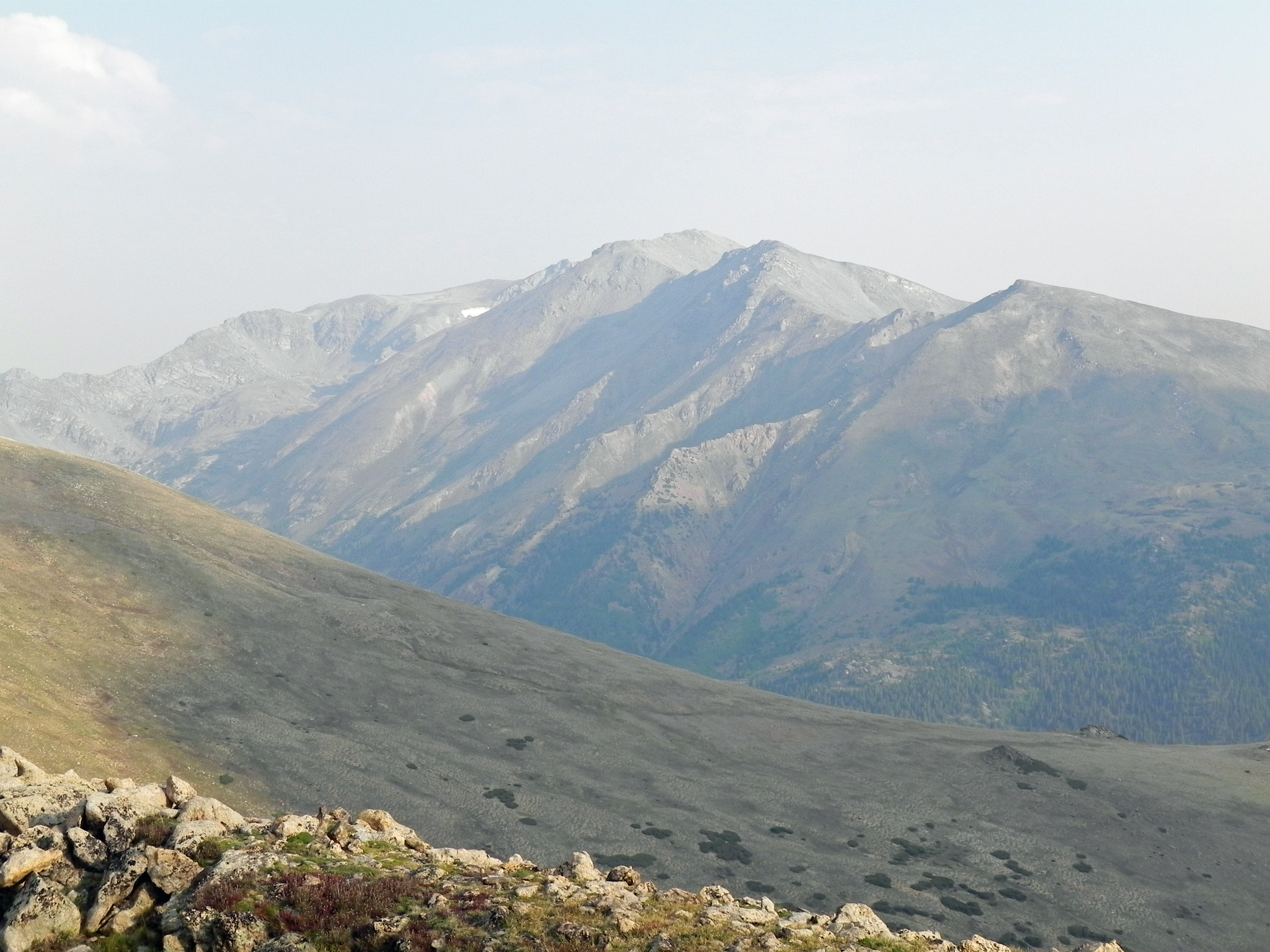
15. Mount Massive is the second-highest summit of Colorado and the Rocky Mountains.

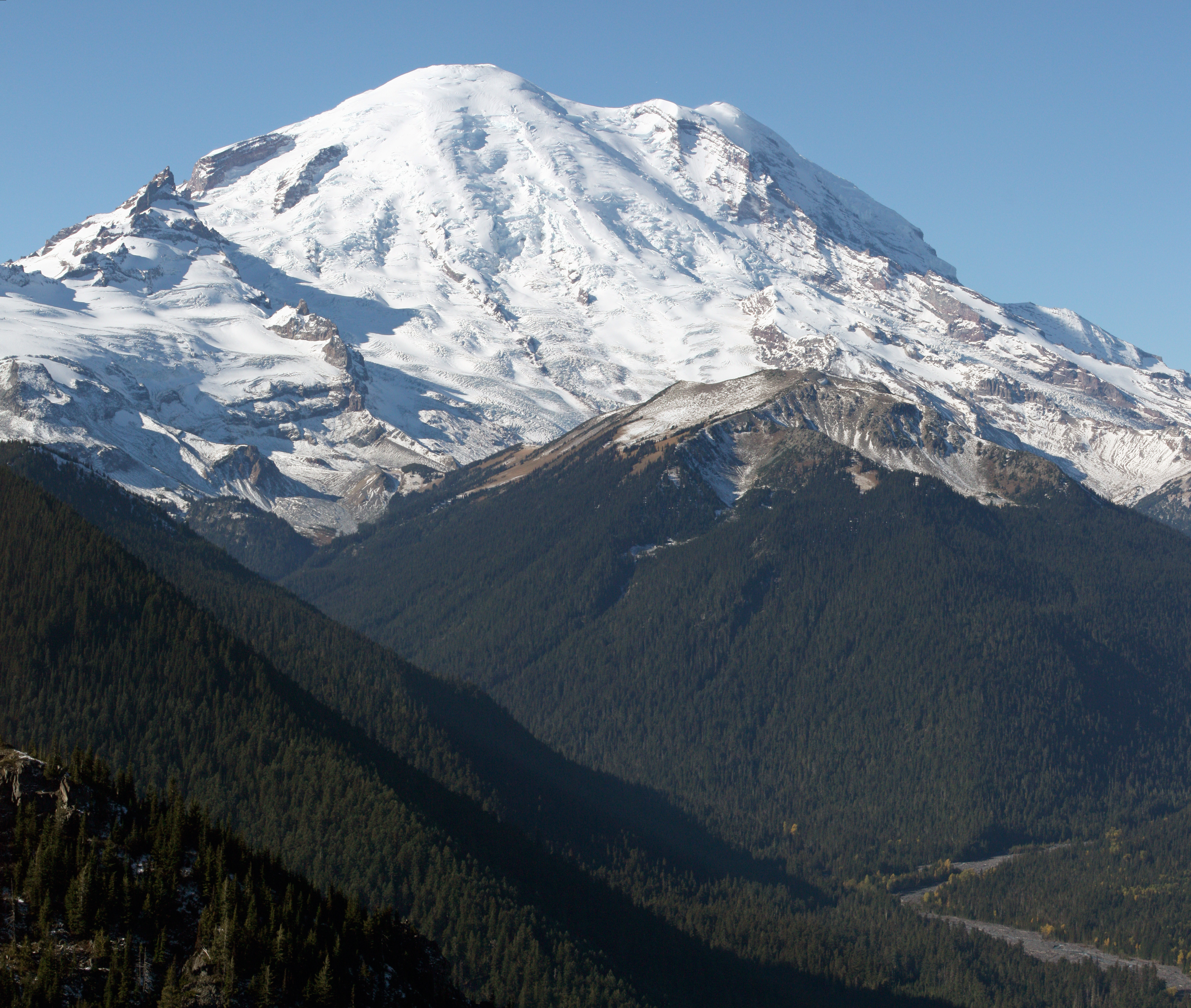
17. Mount Rainier is the highest summit of Washington and the Cascade Range.

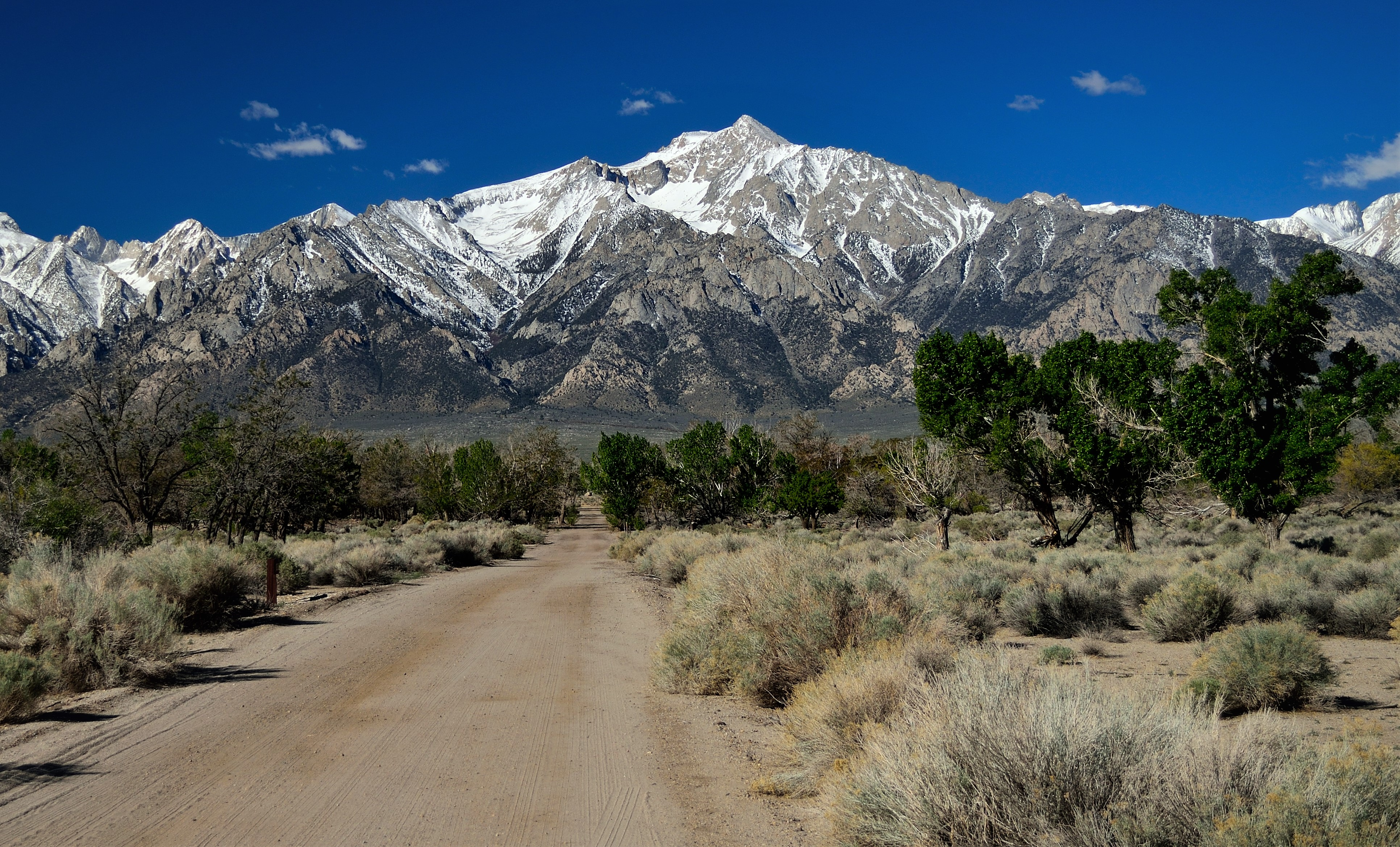
18. Mount Williamson is the second-highest summit of the Sierra Nevada and the state of California.

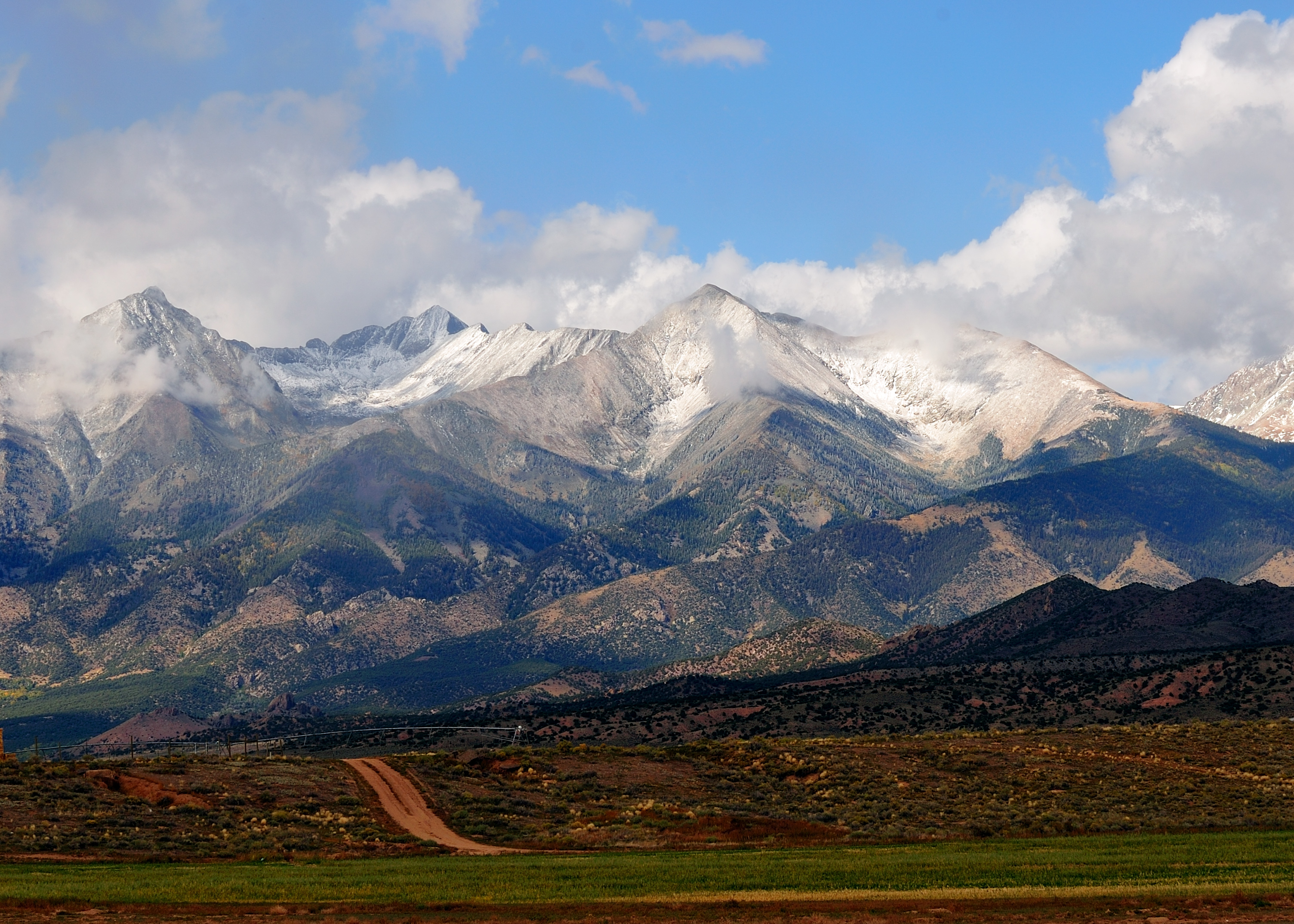
19. Blanca Peak in Colorado is the highest summit of the Sangre de Cristo Mountains and is higher than any point in the United States east of its longitude.

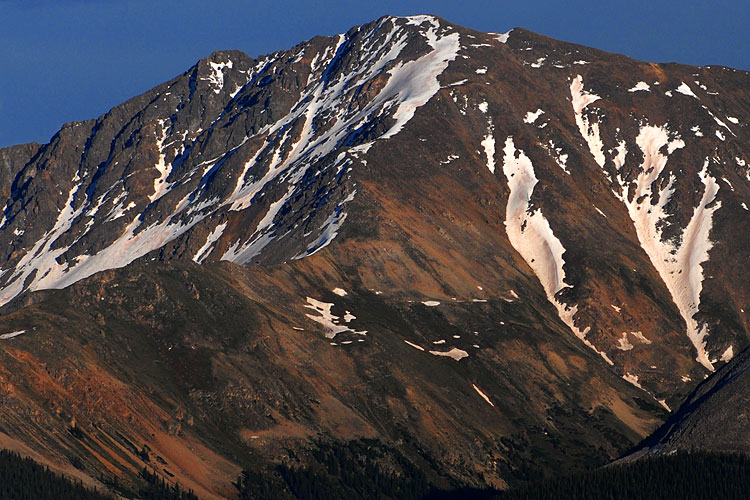
20. La Plata Peak is the fifth-highest summit of Colorado and the Rocky Mountains.

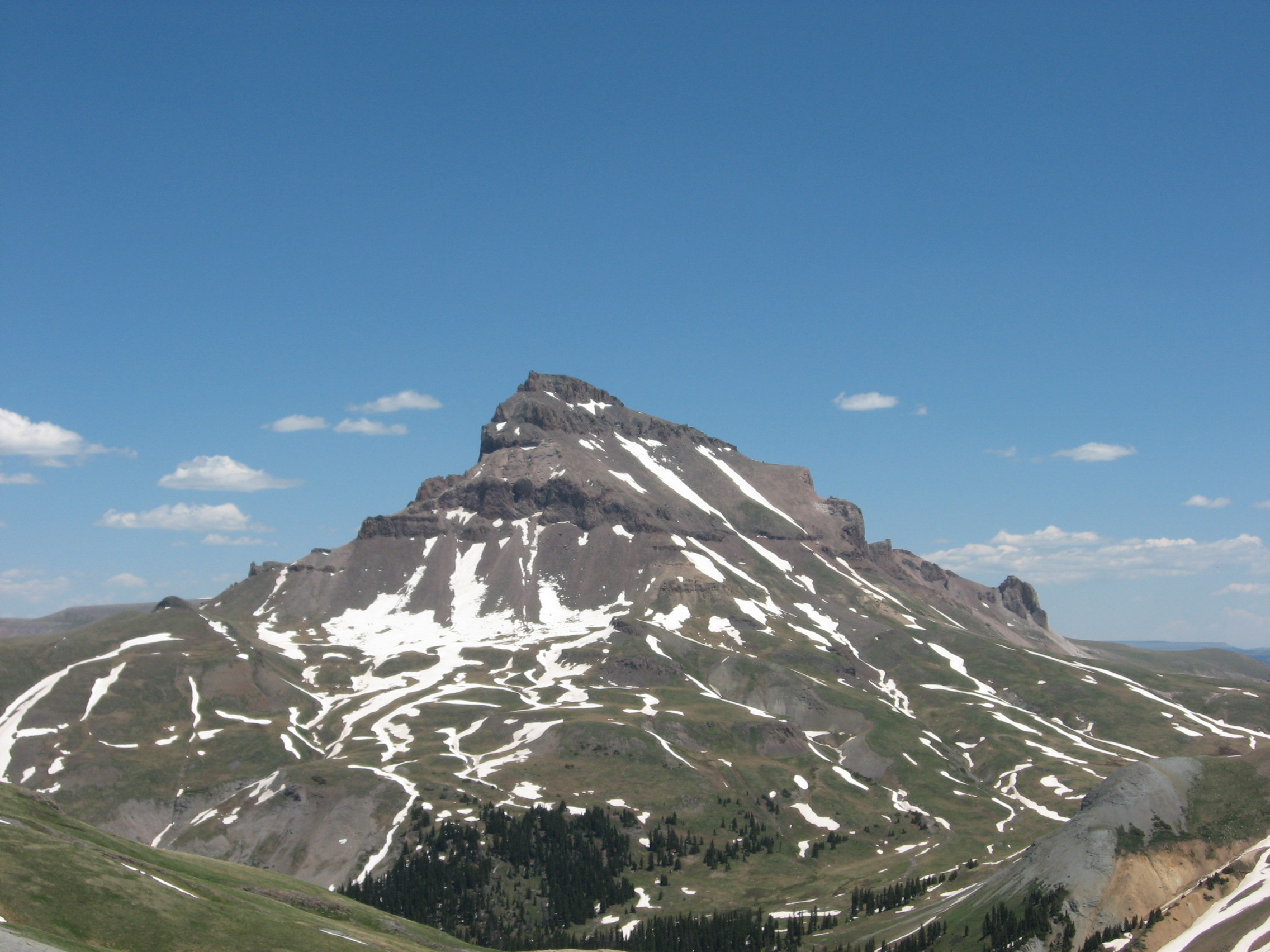
21. Uncompahgre Peak is the highest summit of the San Juan Mountains and the sixth-highest in Colorado.

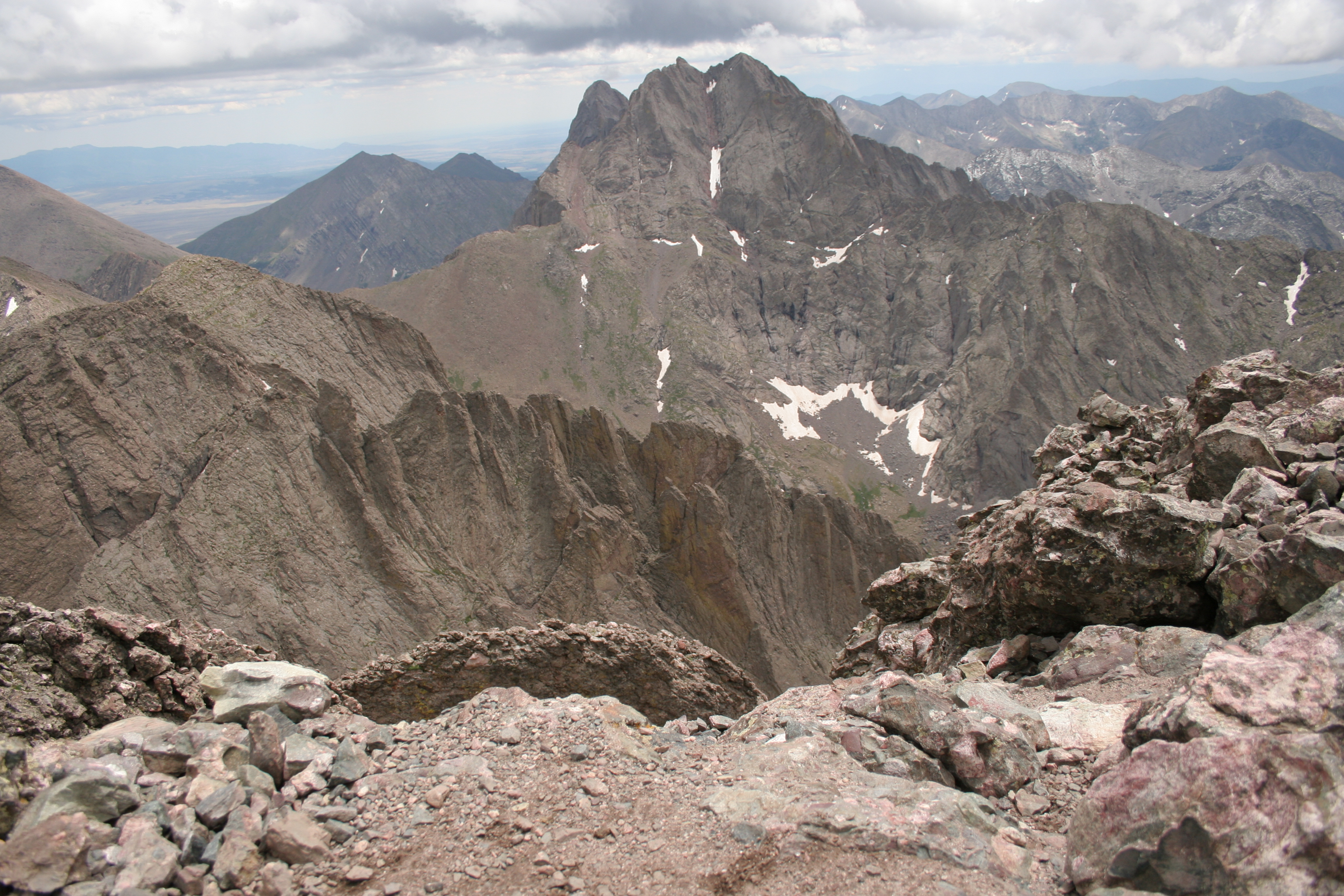
22. Crestone Peak

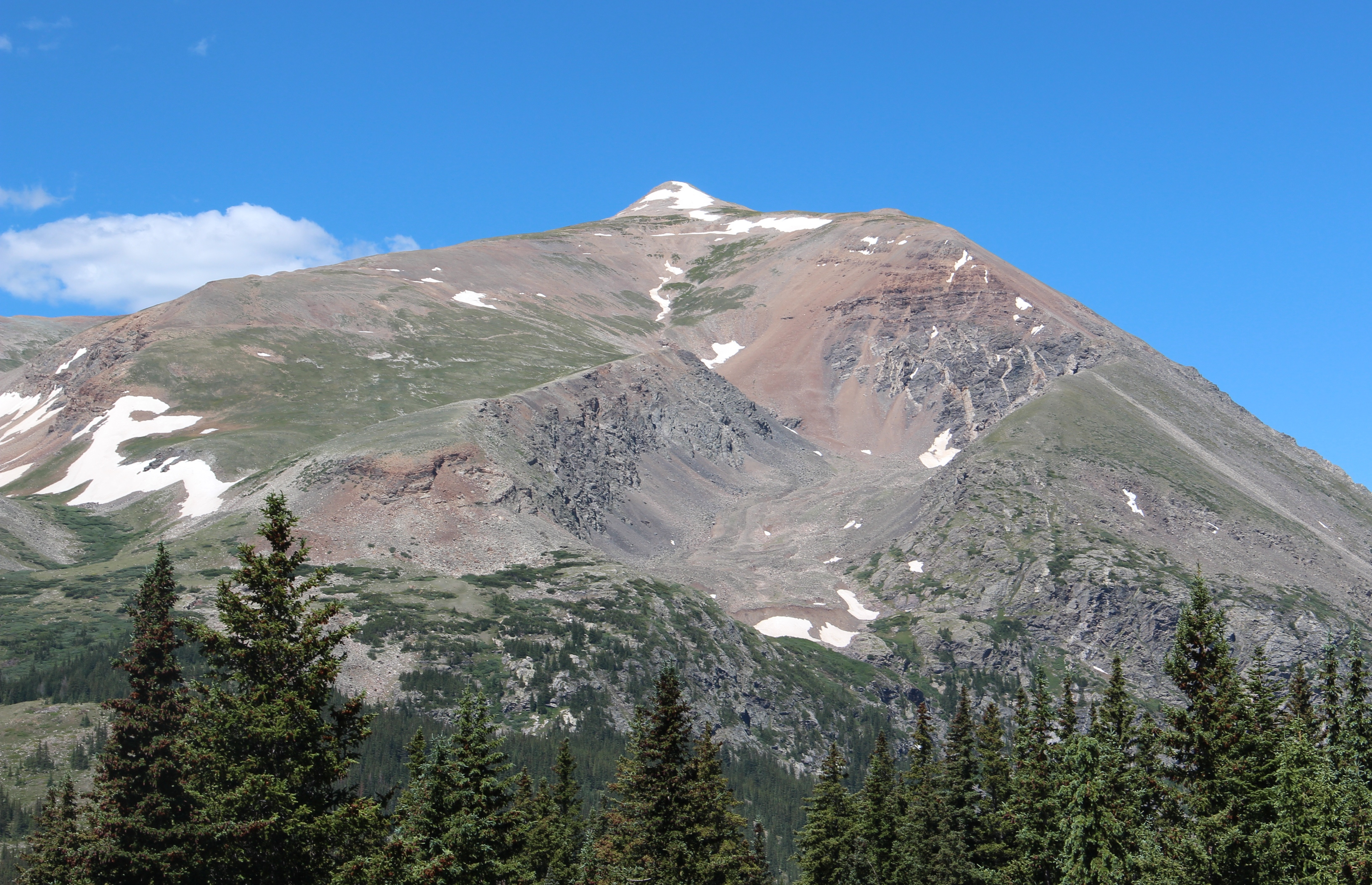
23. Mount Lincoln is the highest summit of Colorado's Mosquito Range and of the entire Missouri River drainage basin.

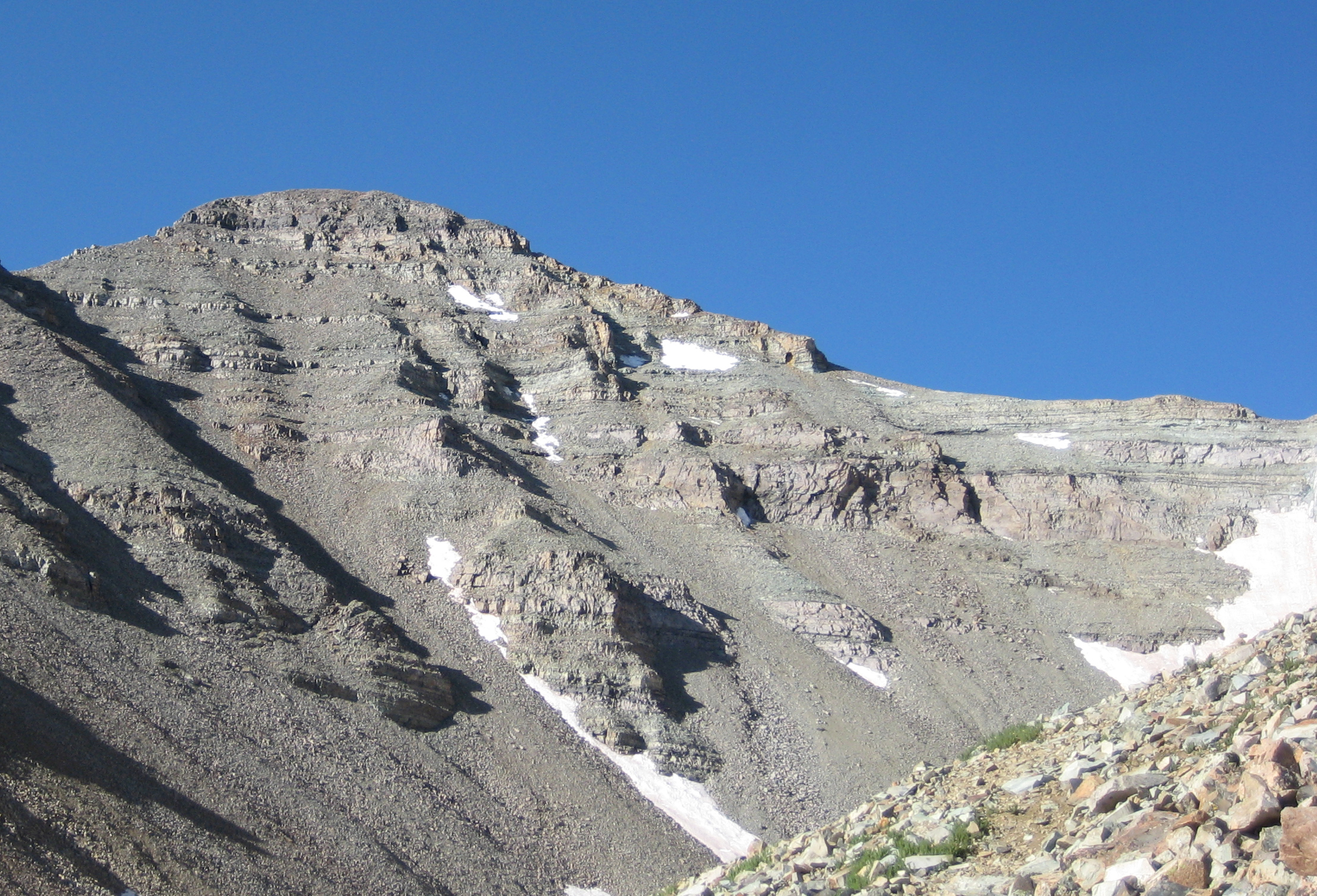
24. Castle Peak is the highest summit of Colorado's Elk Mountains.

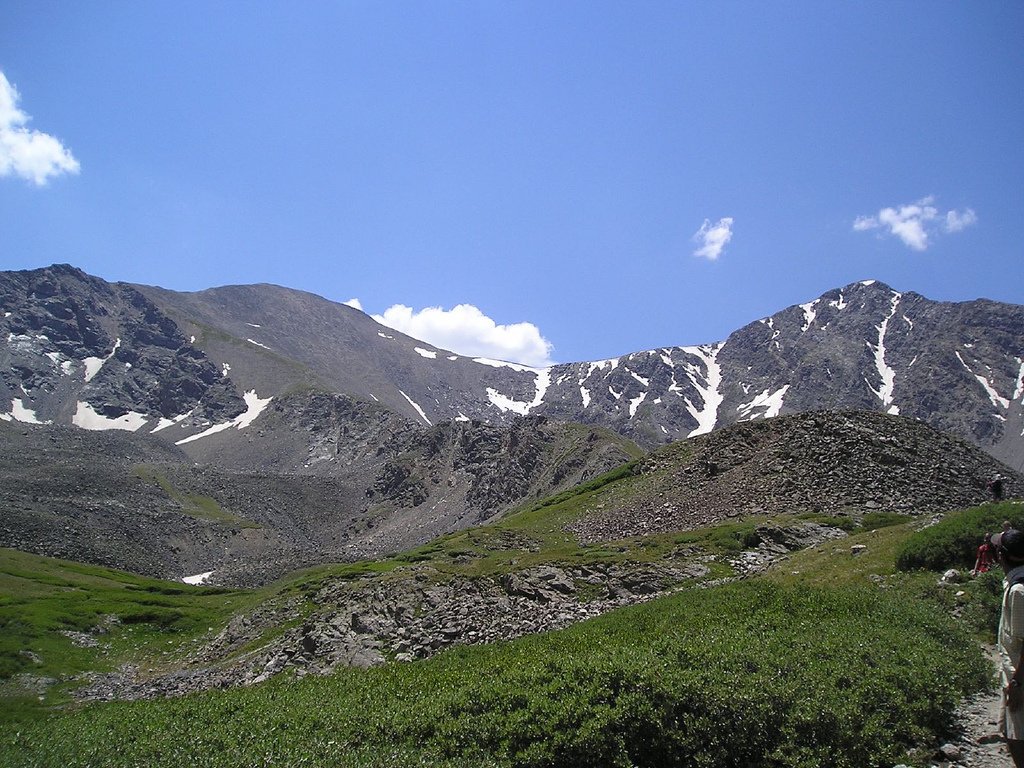
25. Grays Peak in Colorado is the highest point on the Continental Divide in North America.

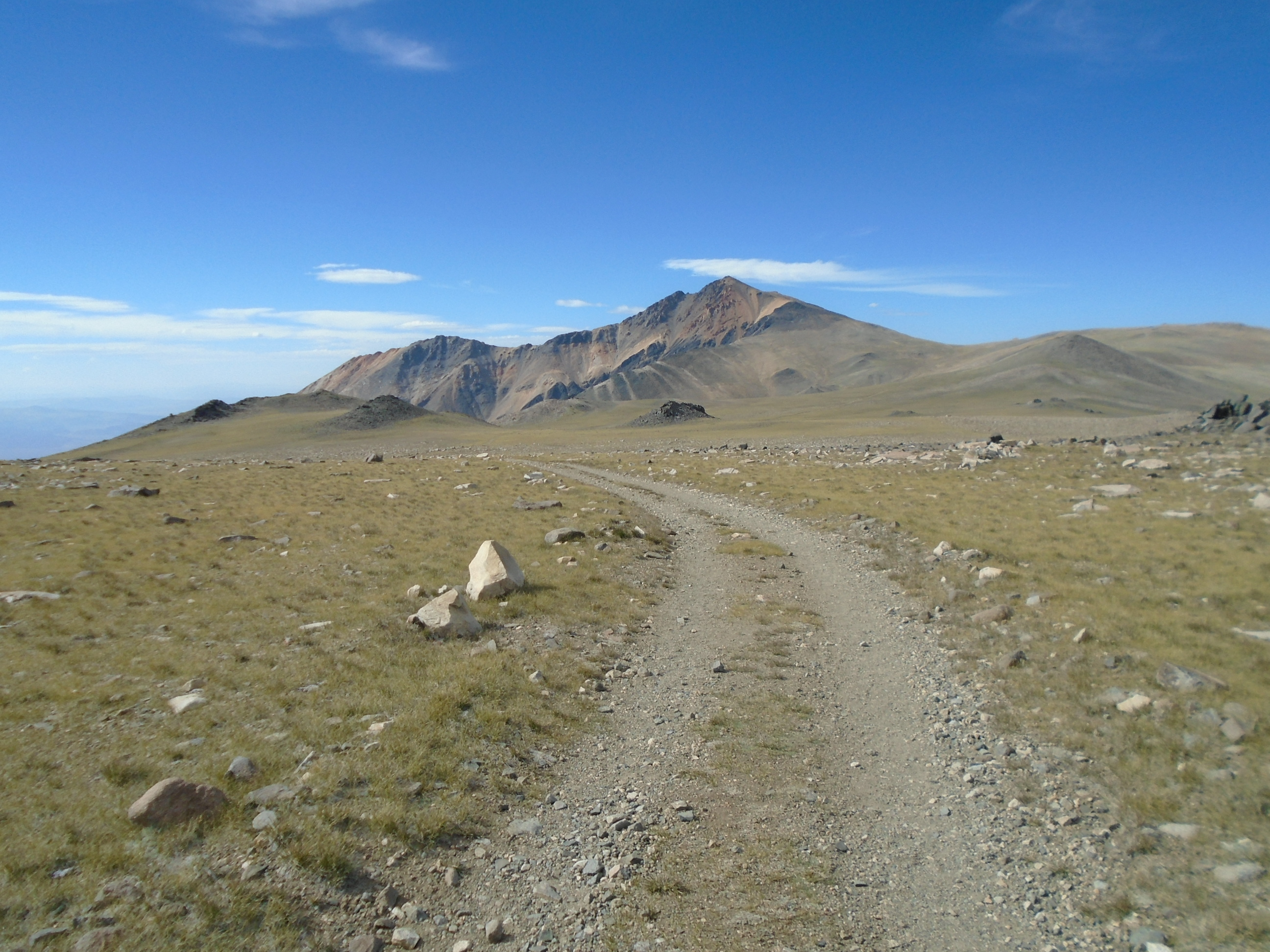
30. The summit of White Mountain Peak is the highest point in California's White Mountains and the third-highest point in the state of California.

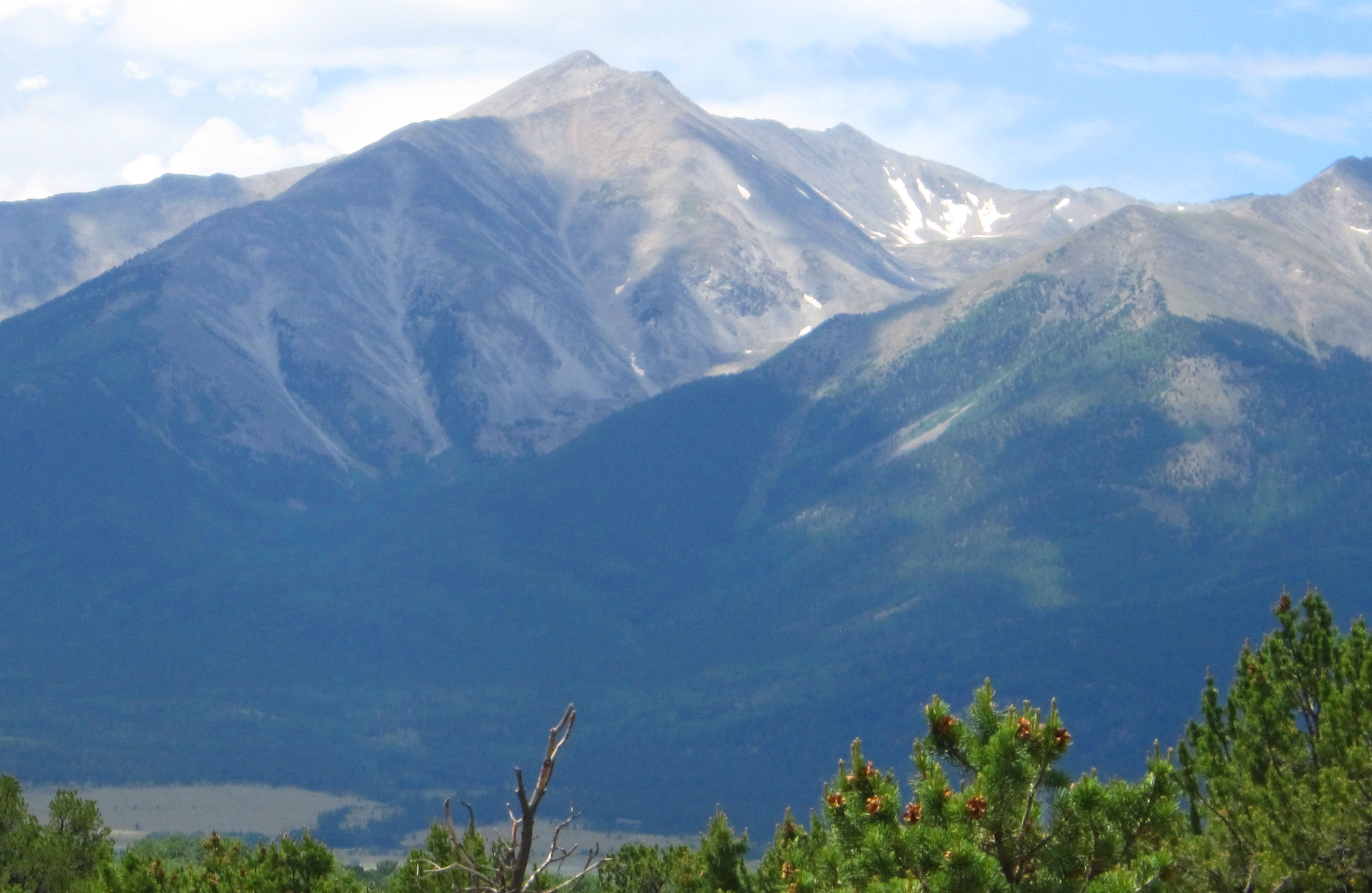
32. Mount Princeton in Colorado's Sawatch Range

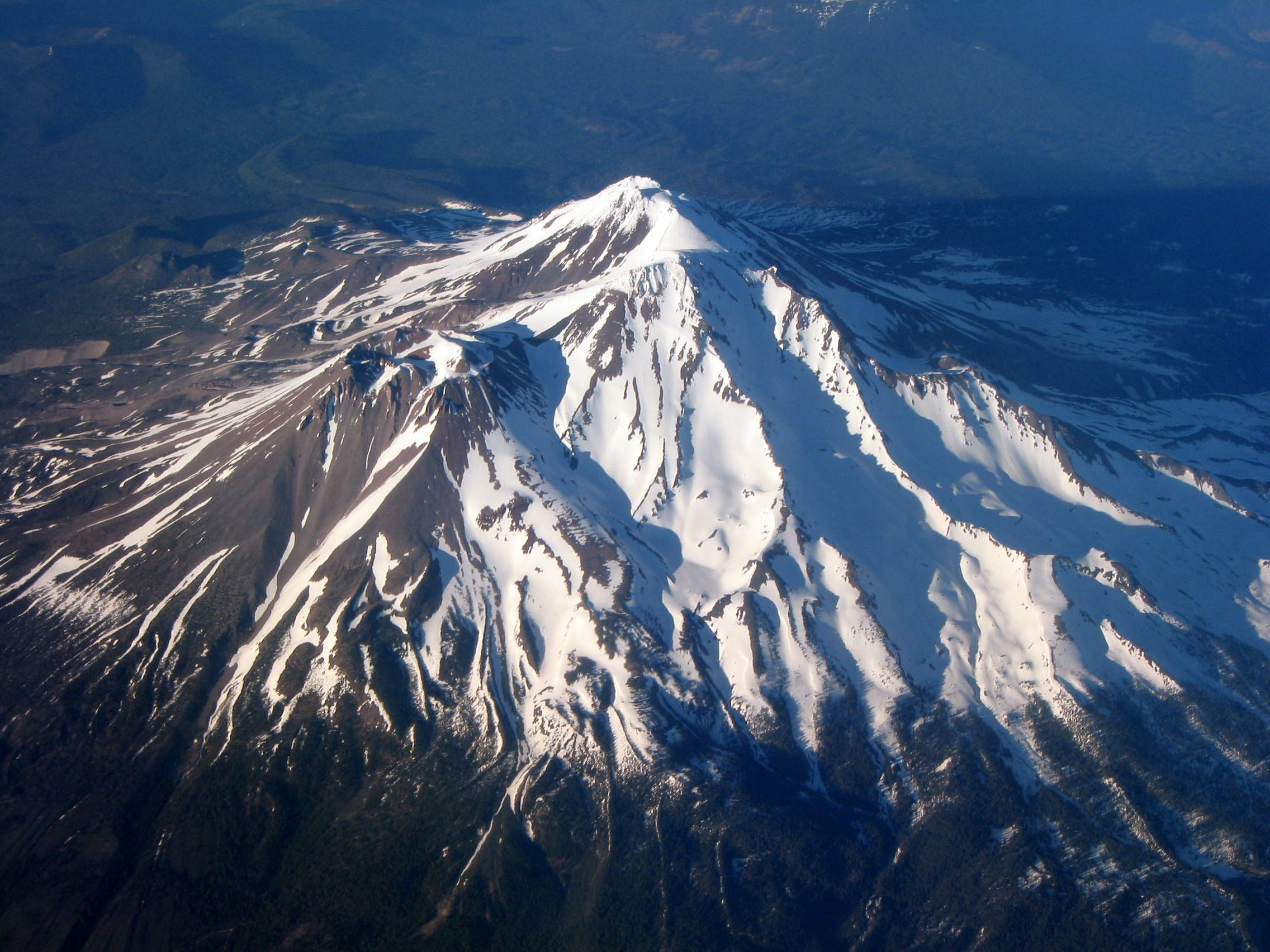
34. Mount Shasta in California is the highest summit of the southern Cascade Range.

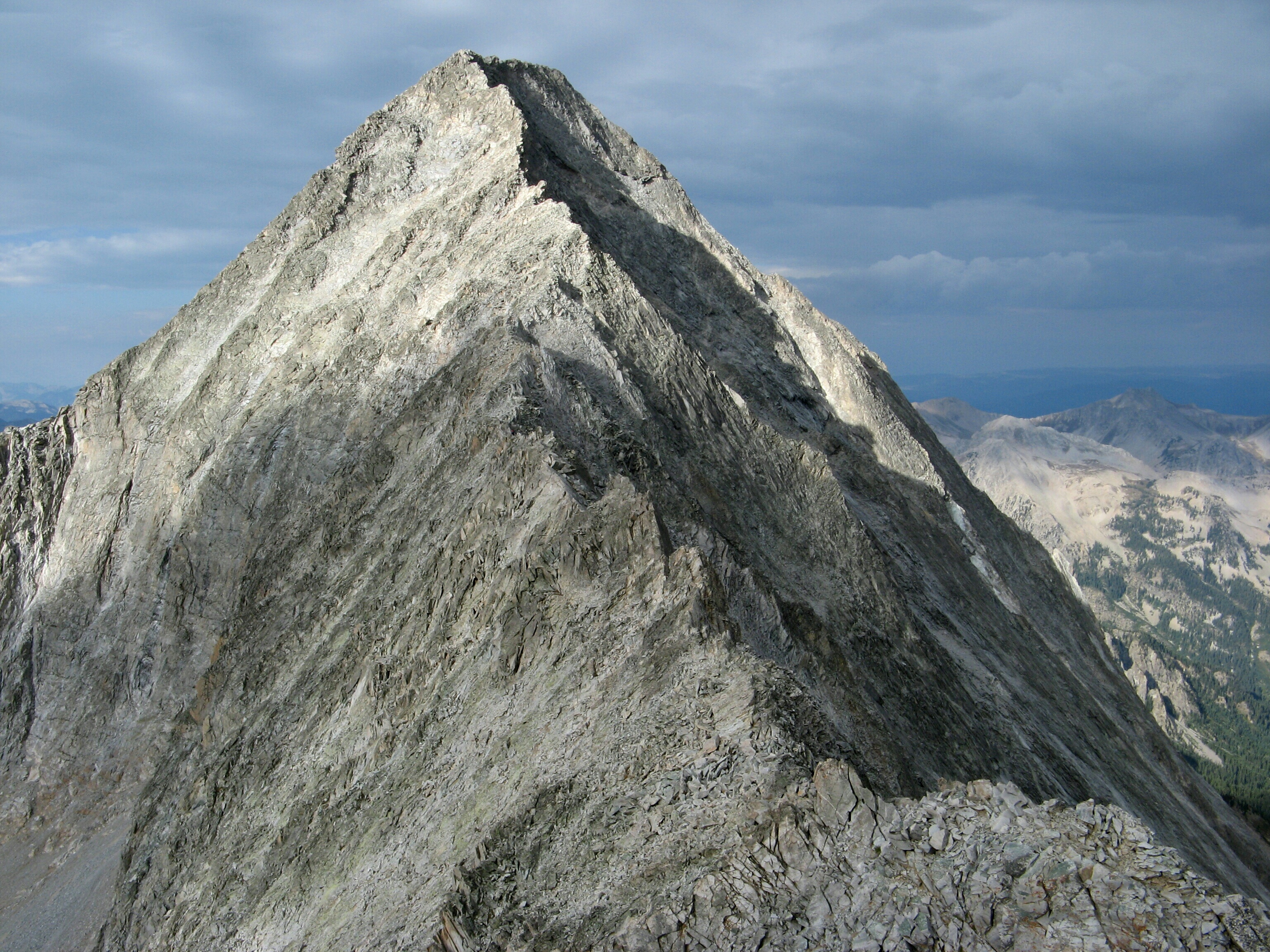
38. Capitol Peak in Colorado's Elk Mountains

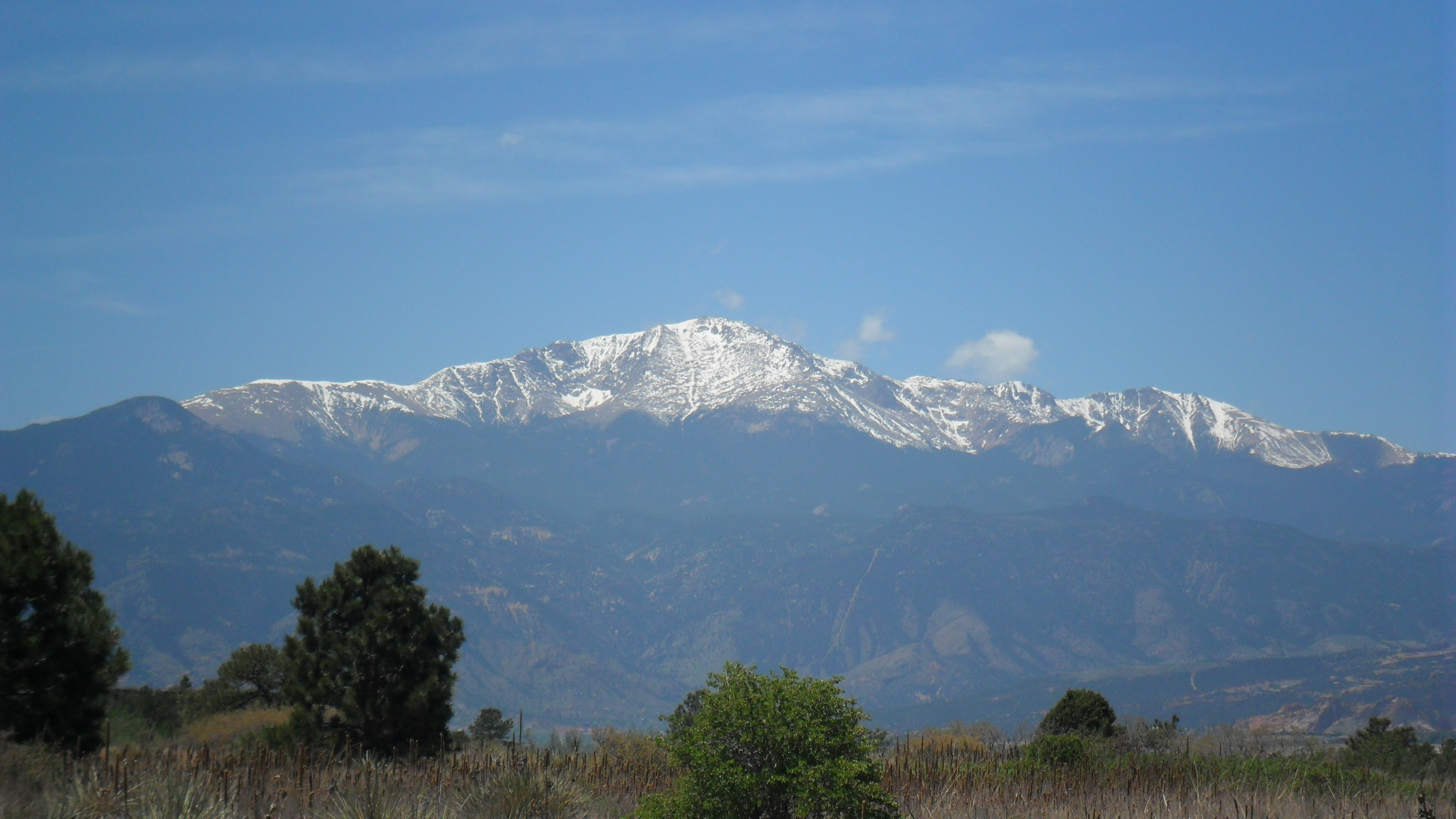
39. Pikes Peak in Colorado was the inspiration for America the Beautiful.

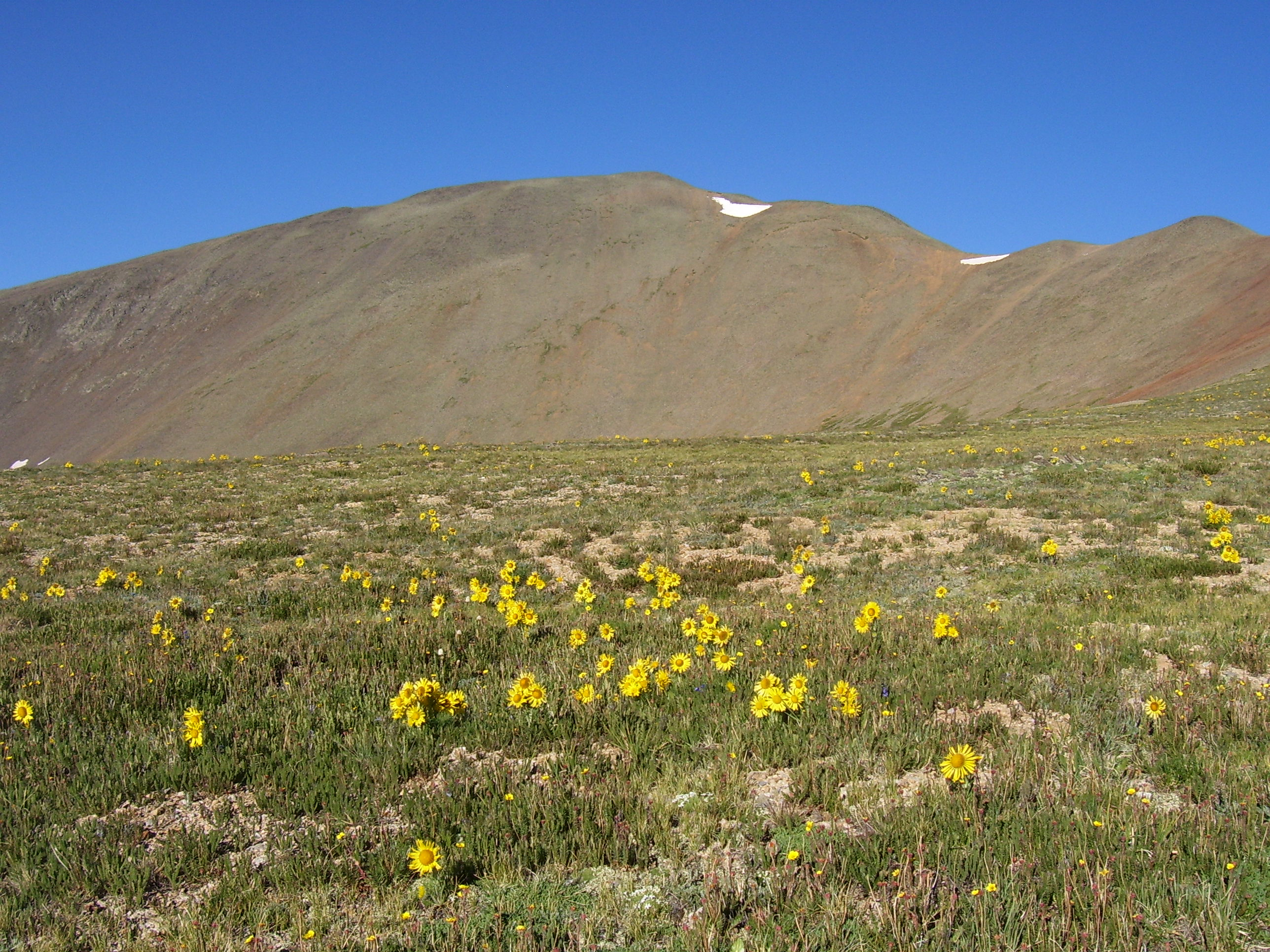
44. The summit of San Luis Peak is the highest point in Colorado's La Garita Mountains.

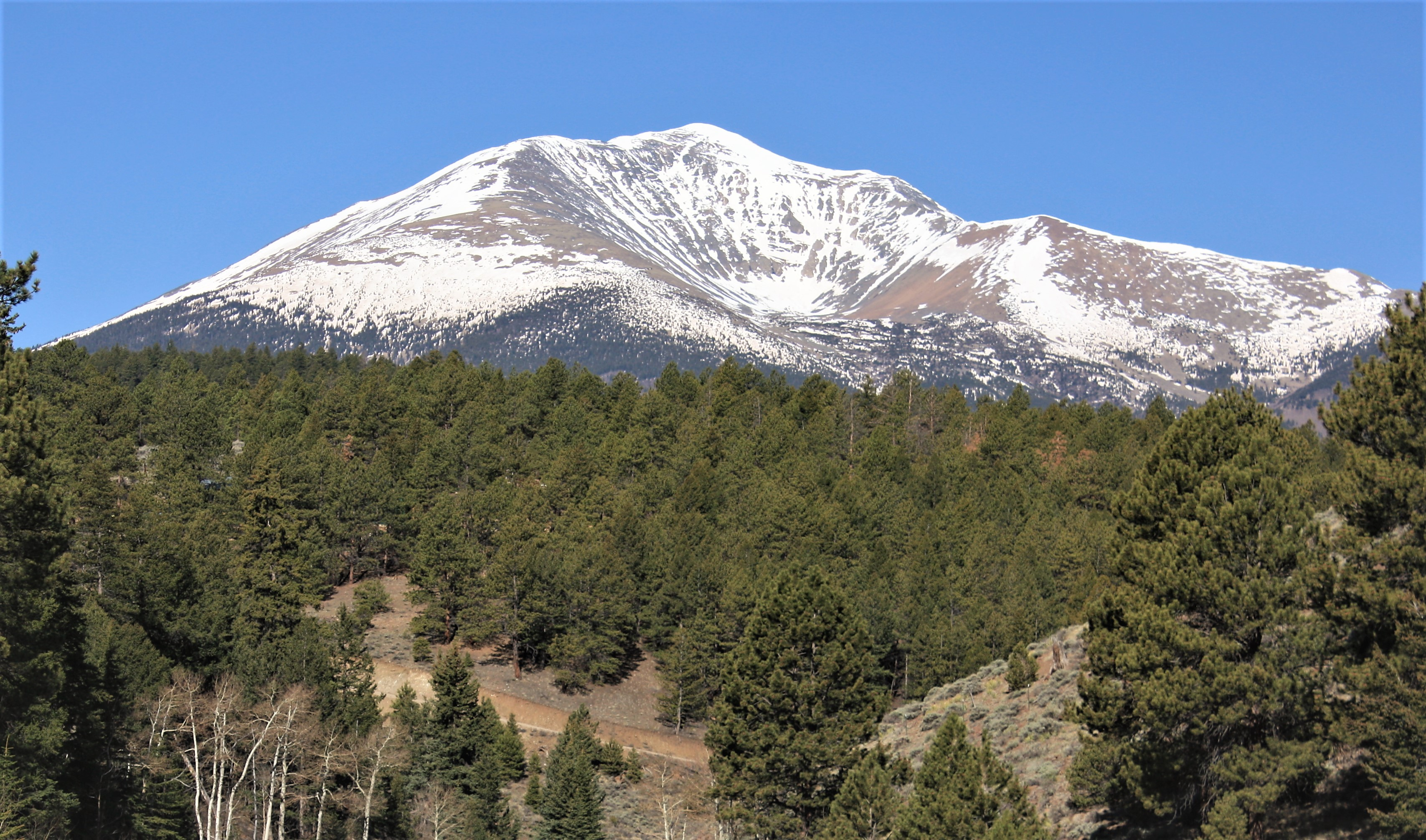
49. Mount Ouray

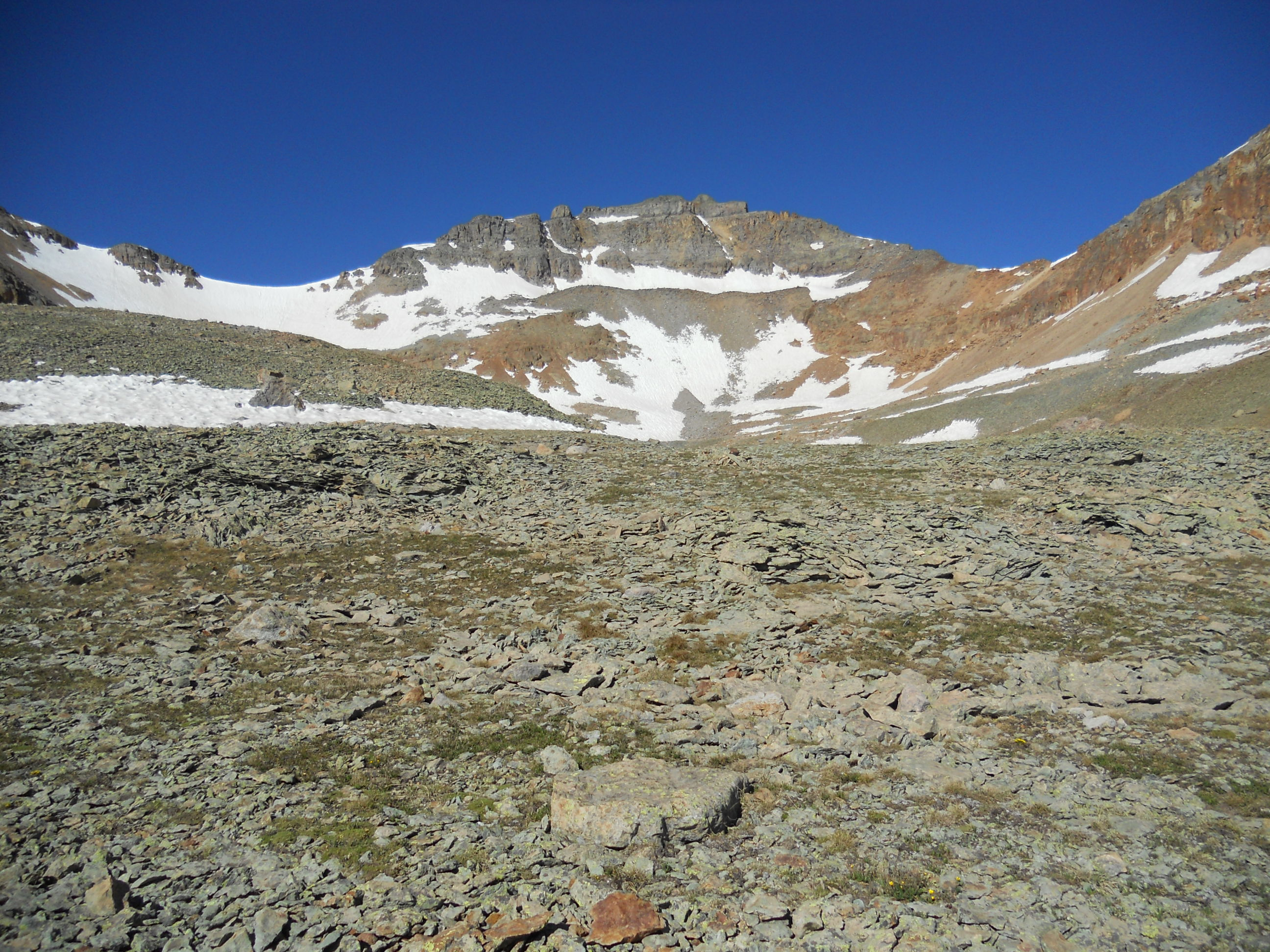
50. Vermilion Peak

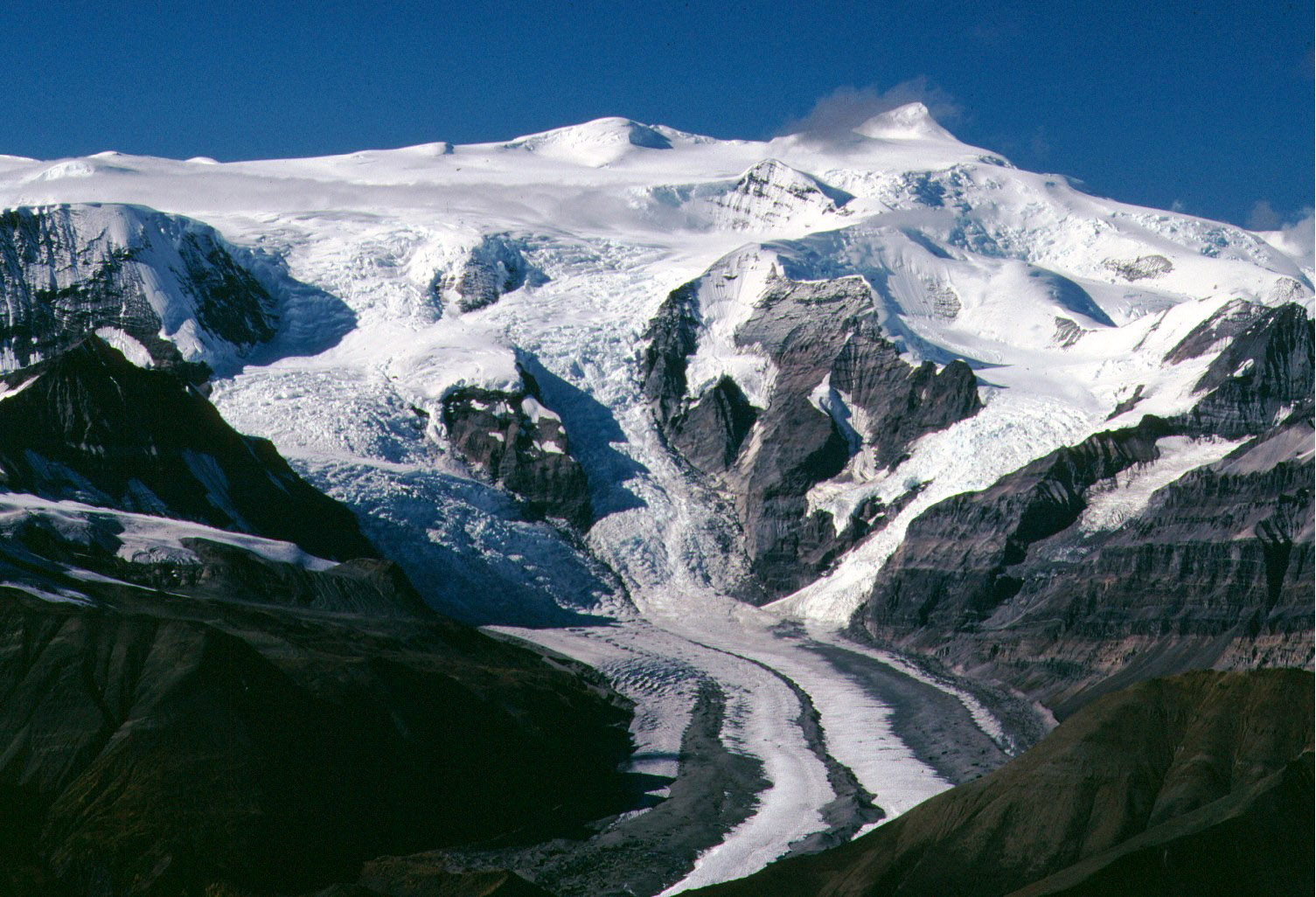
52. Regal Mountain is the 16th highest major summit in Alaska.

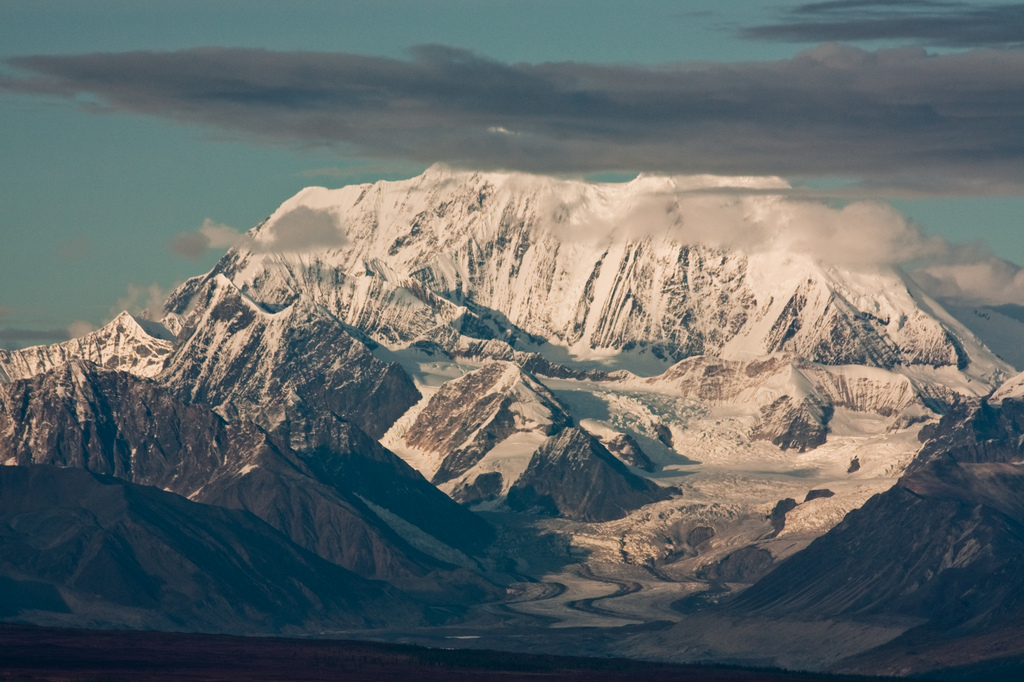
54. Mount Hayes is the highest summit of the eastern Alaska Range.

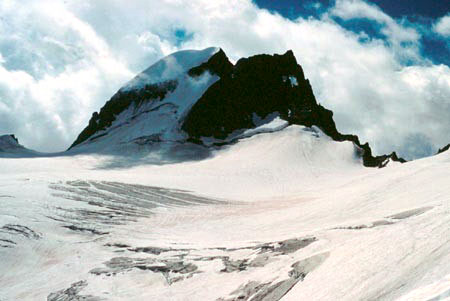
57. Gannett Peak is the highest summit of the Wind River Range and Wyoming.

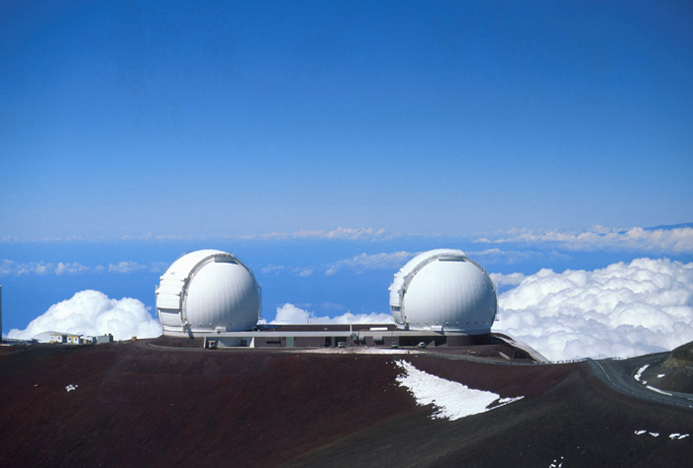
59. Mauna Kea on the Island of Hawaiʻi is the tallest mountain on Earth as measured from base to summit.

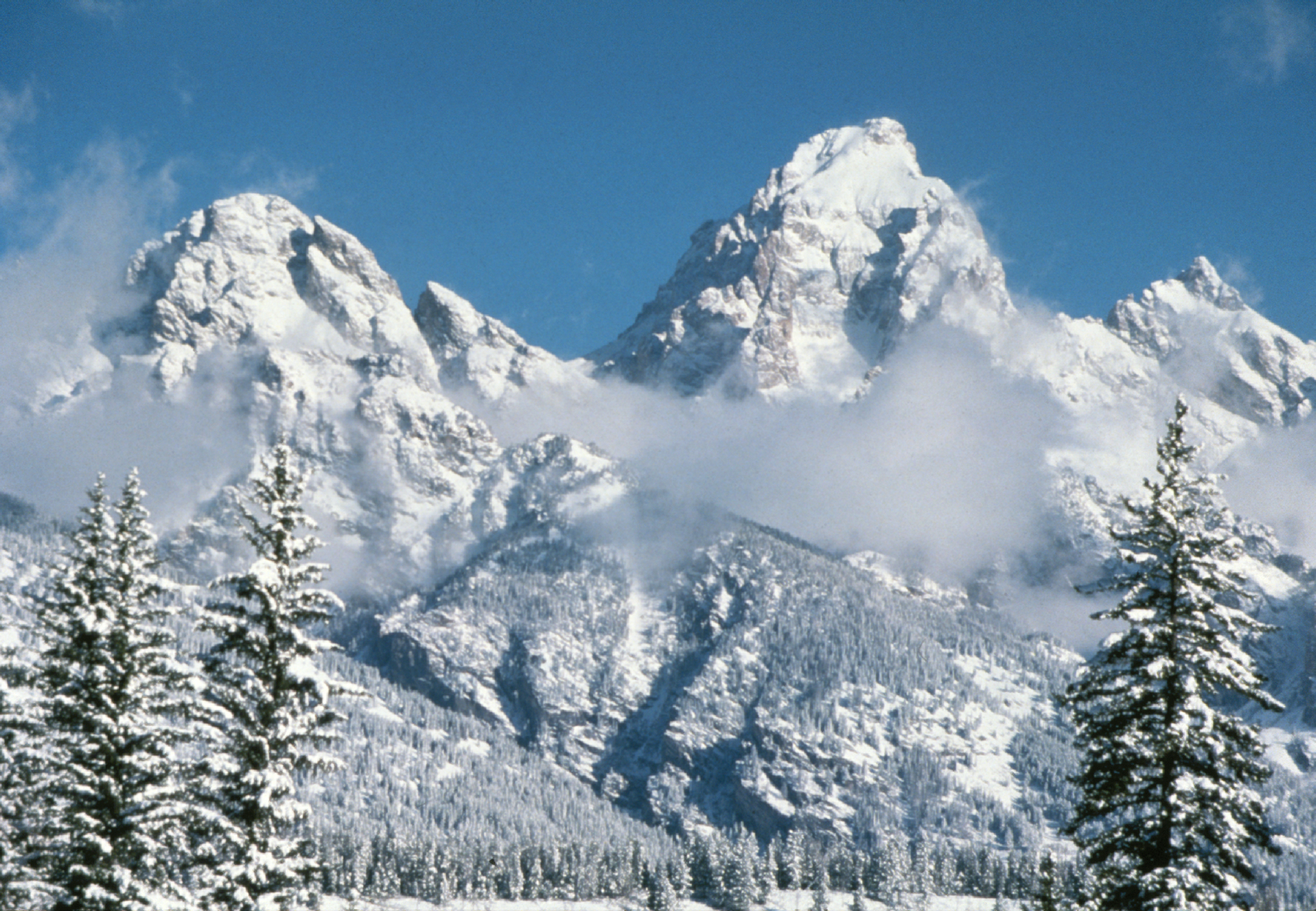
60. Grand Teton in Wyoming is the highest summit of the Teton Range.

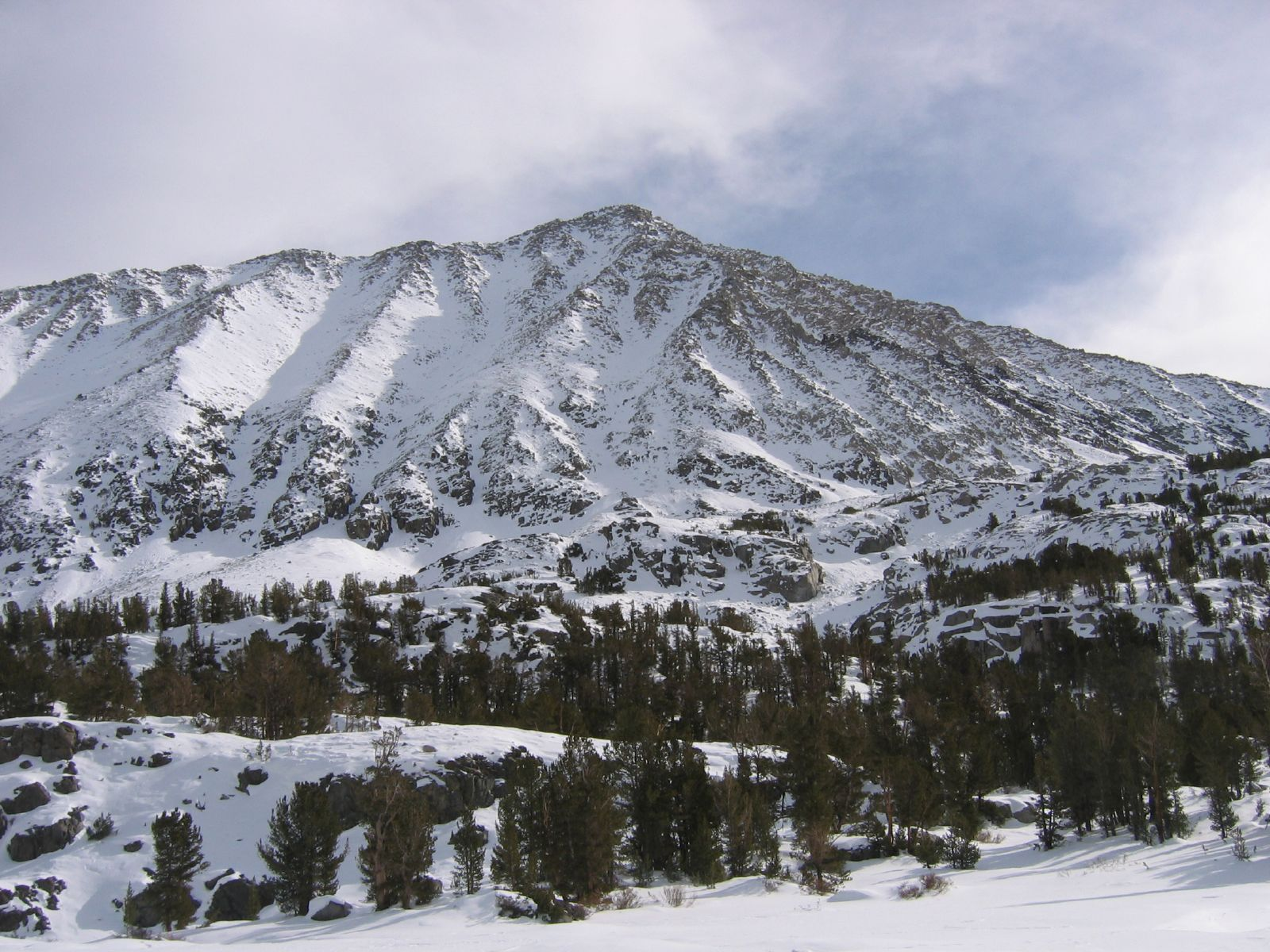
62. Mount Morgan

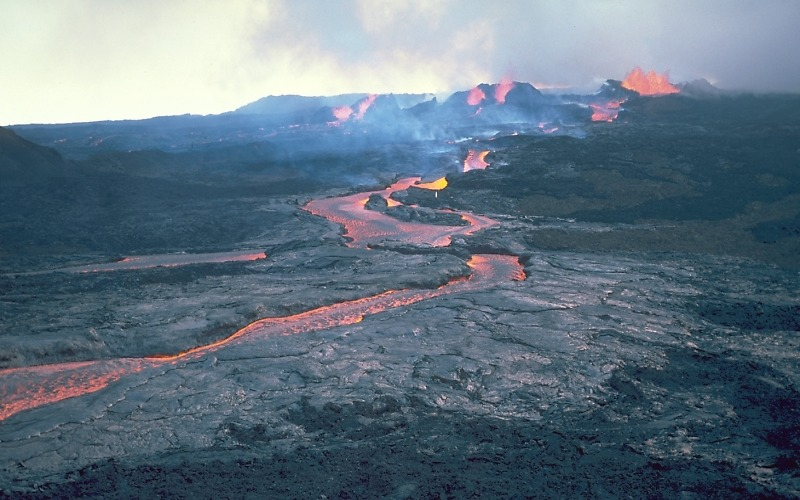
66. Mauna Loa on the Island of Hawaiʻi is the most voluminous mountain on Earth.

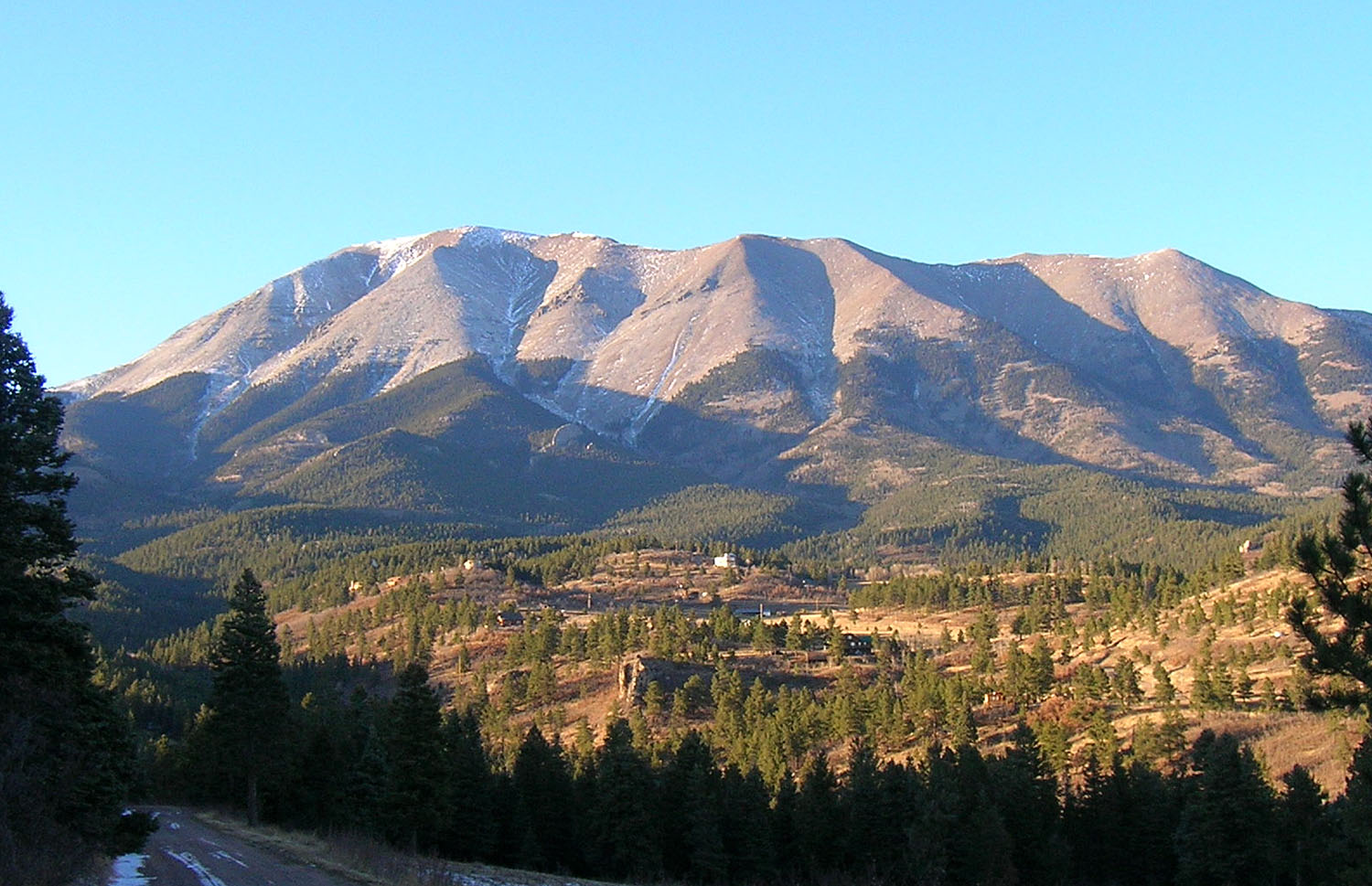
70. The summit of West Spanish Peak is the highest point in Las Animas County, Colorado.

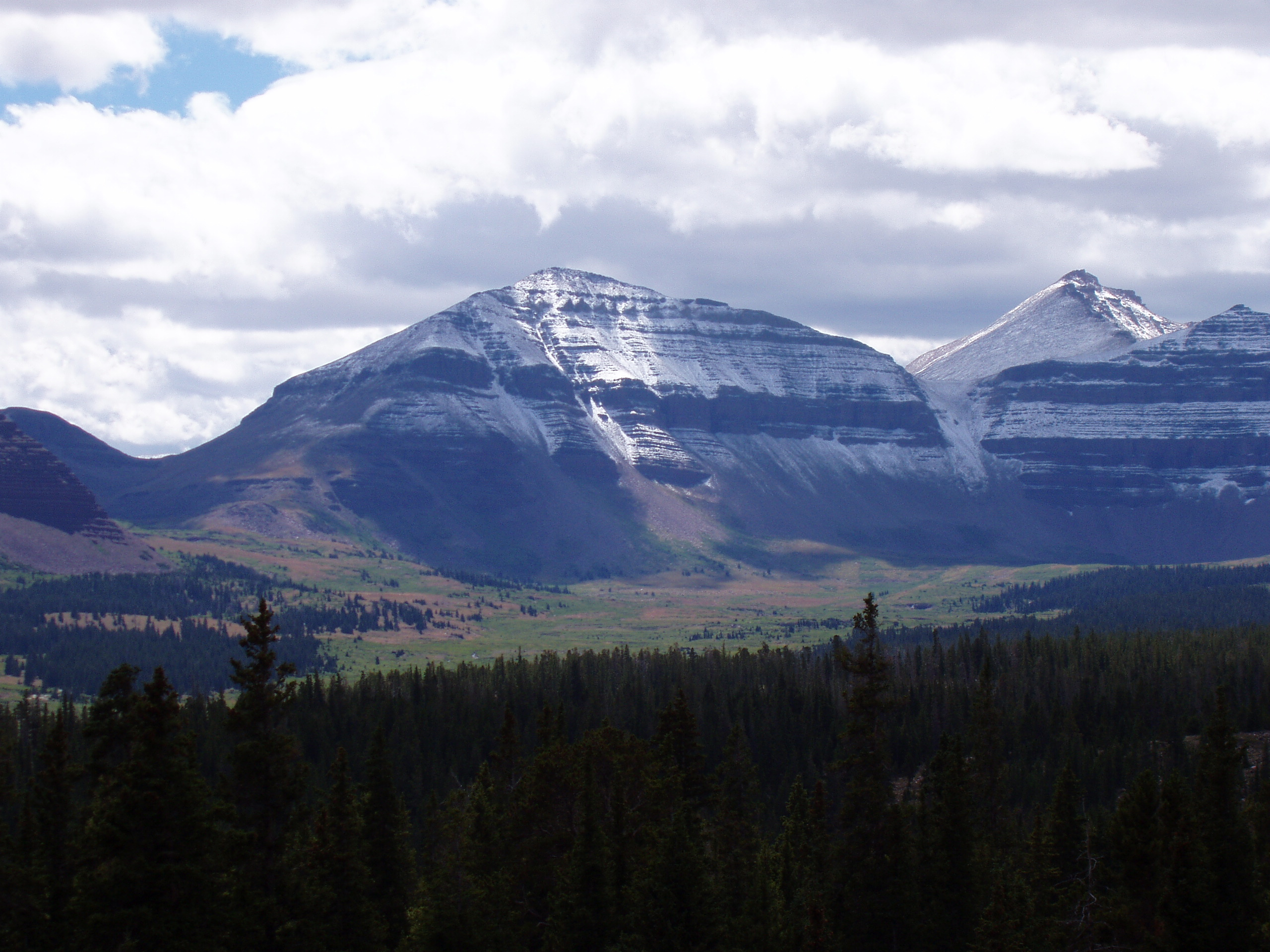
76. Kings Peak is the highest summit of the Uinta Range and Utah.

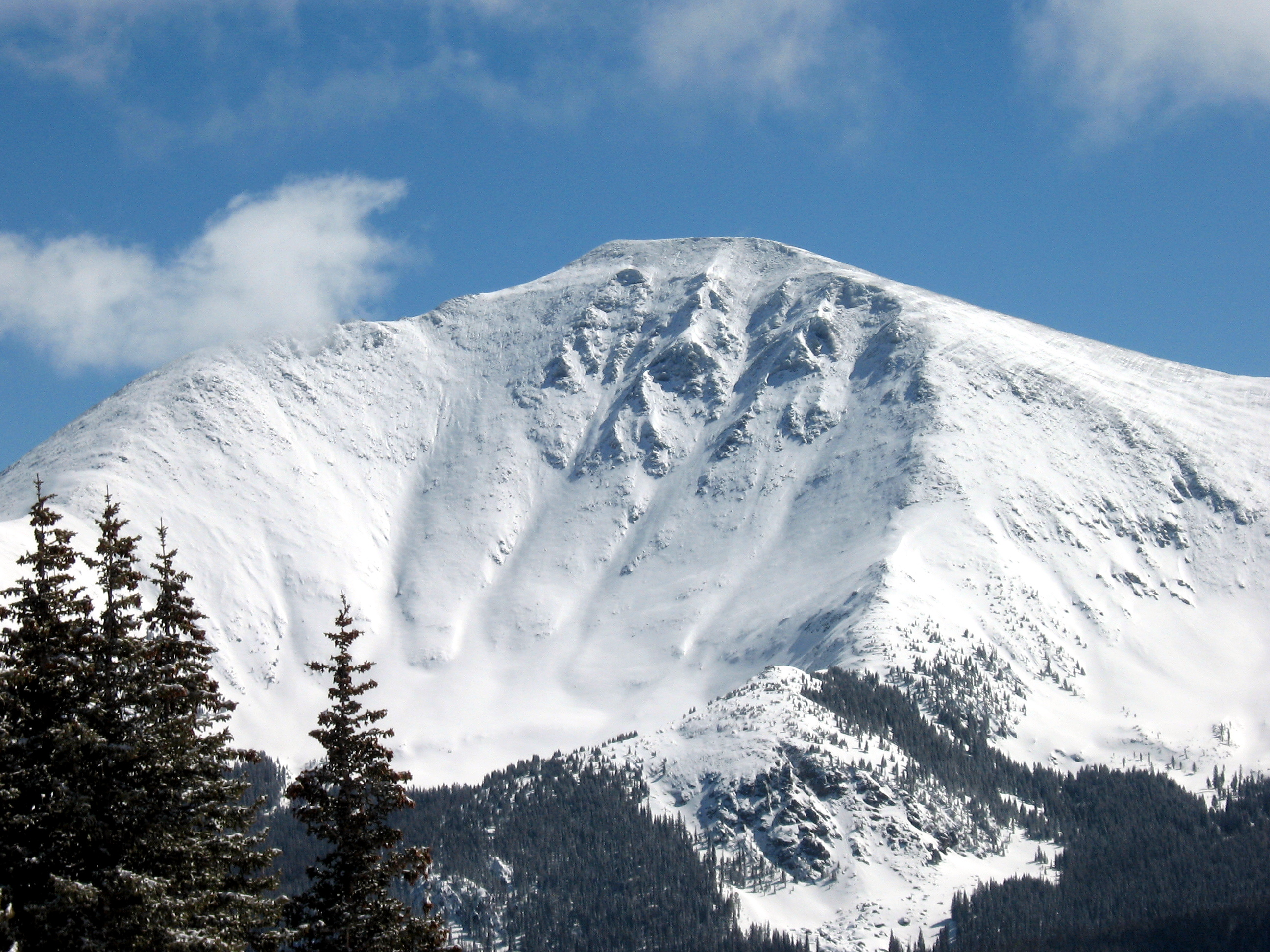
81. Parry Peak in Colorado's Front Range

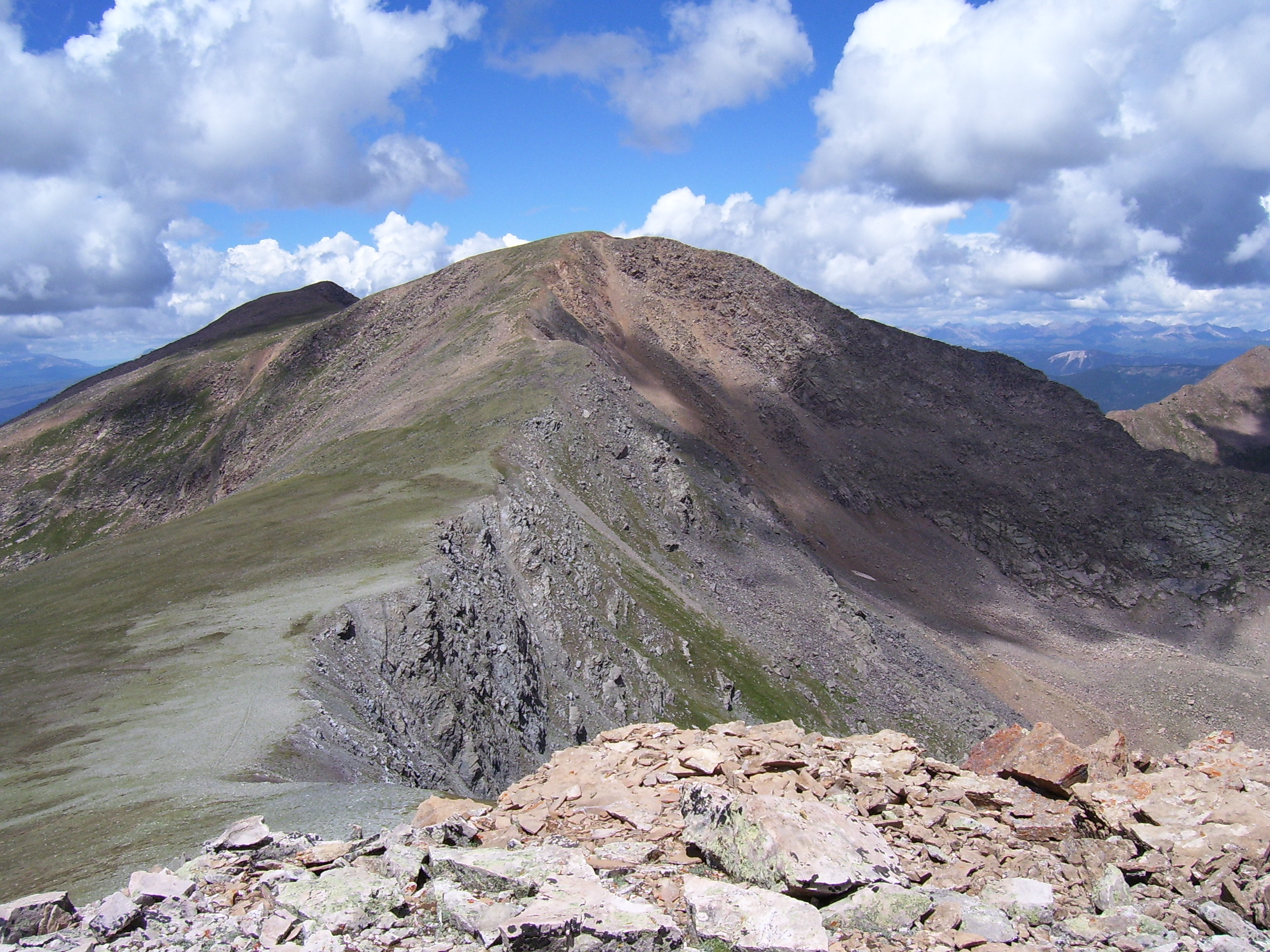
90. Henry Mountain in Gunnison County, Colorado

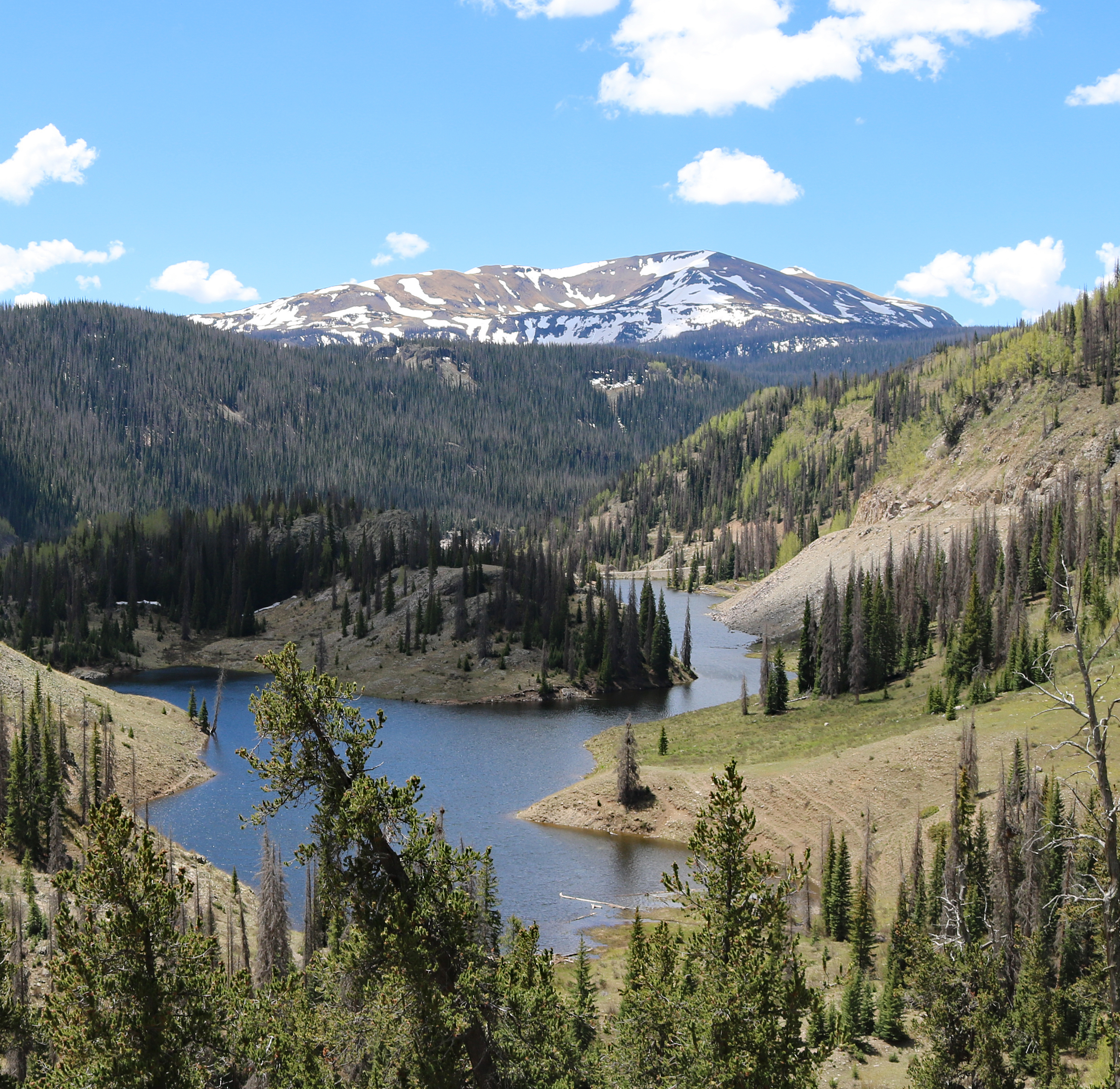
96. Conejos Peak is the highest summit of Conejos County in the state of Colorado.

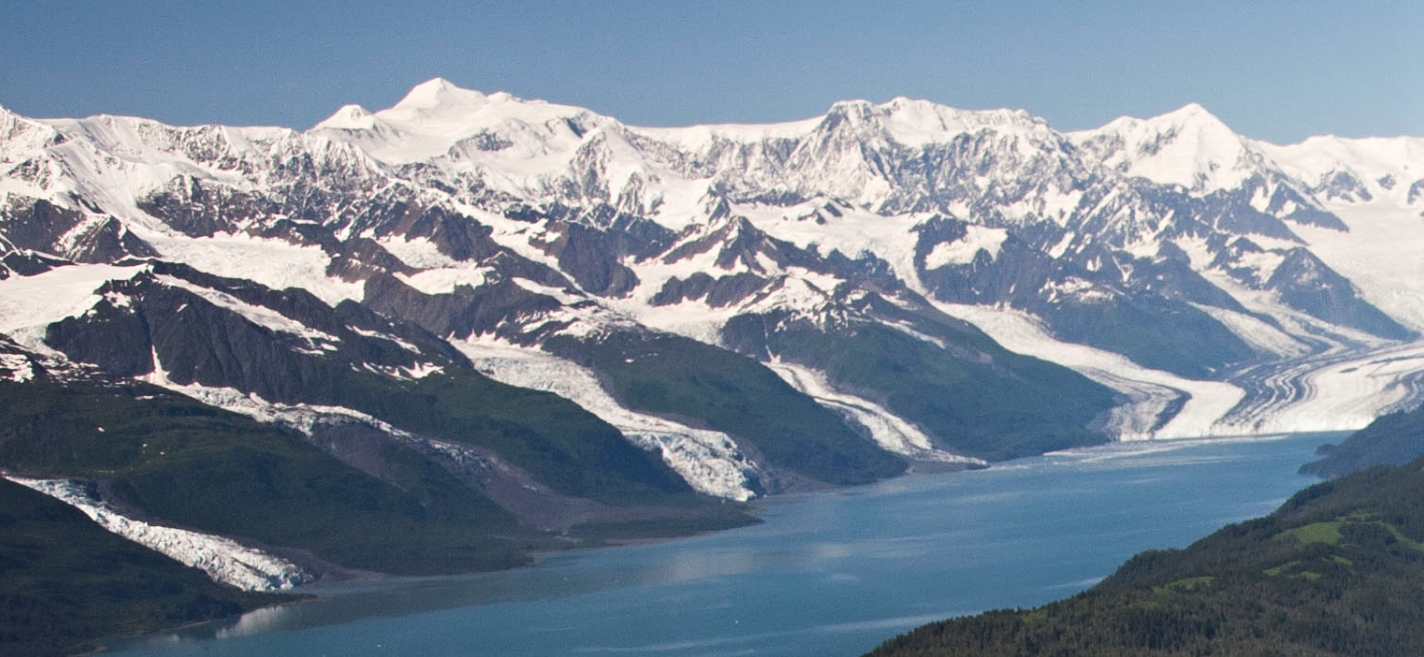
97. Mount Marcus Baker is the highest summit of Alaska's Chugach Mountains and the eighth most prominent summit in the United States.

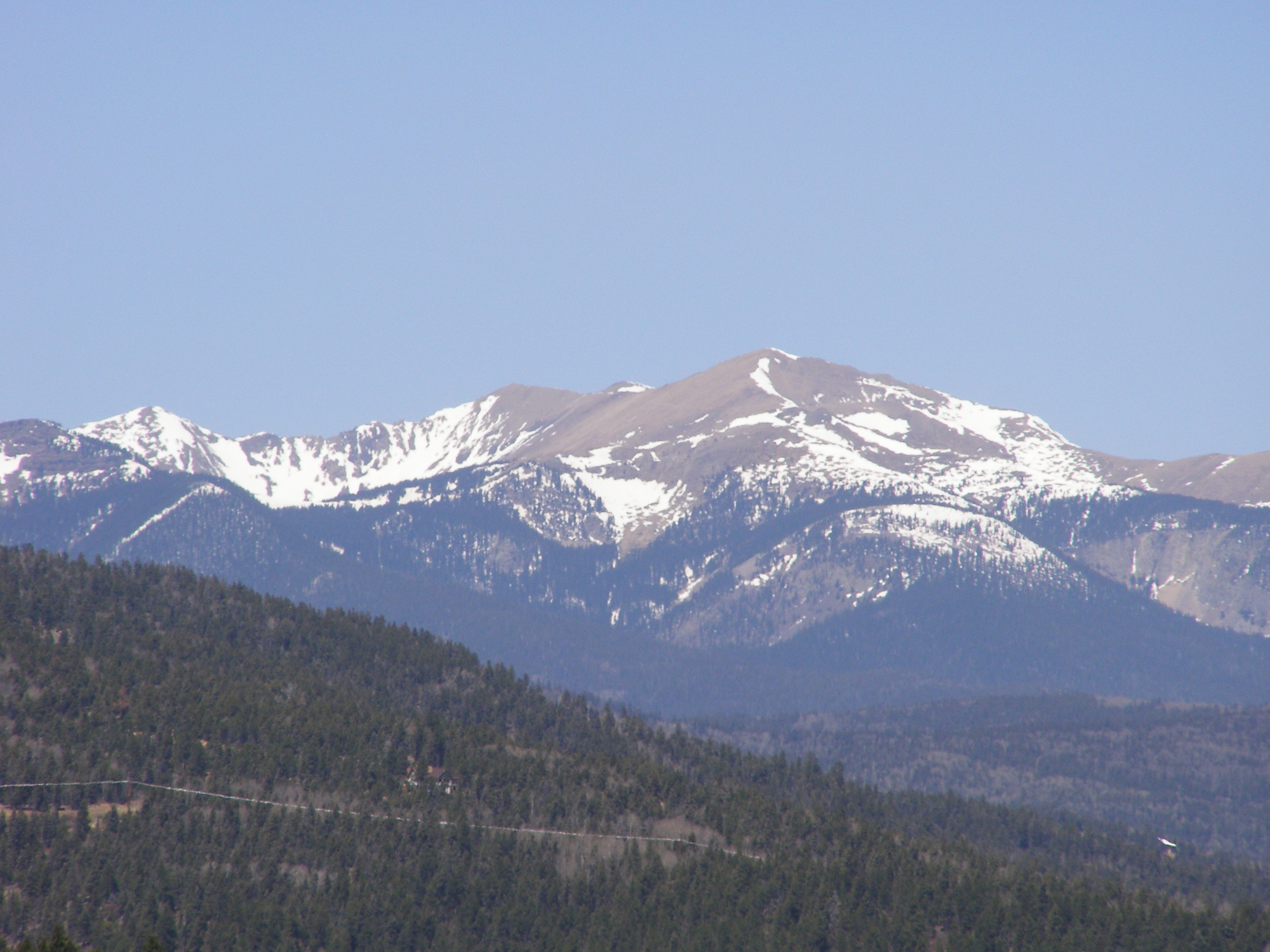
99. Wheeler Peak is the highest summit of New Mexico.

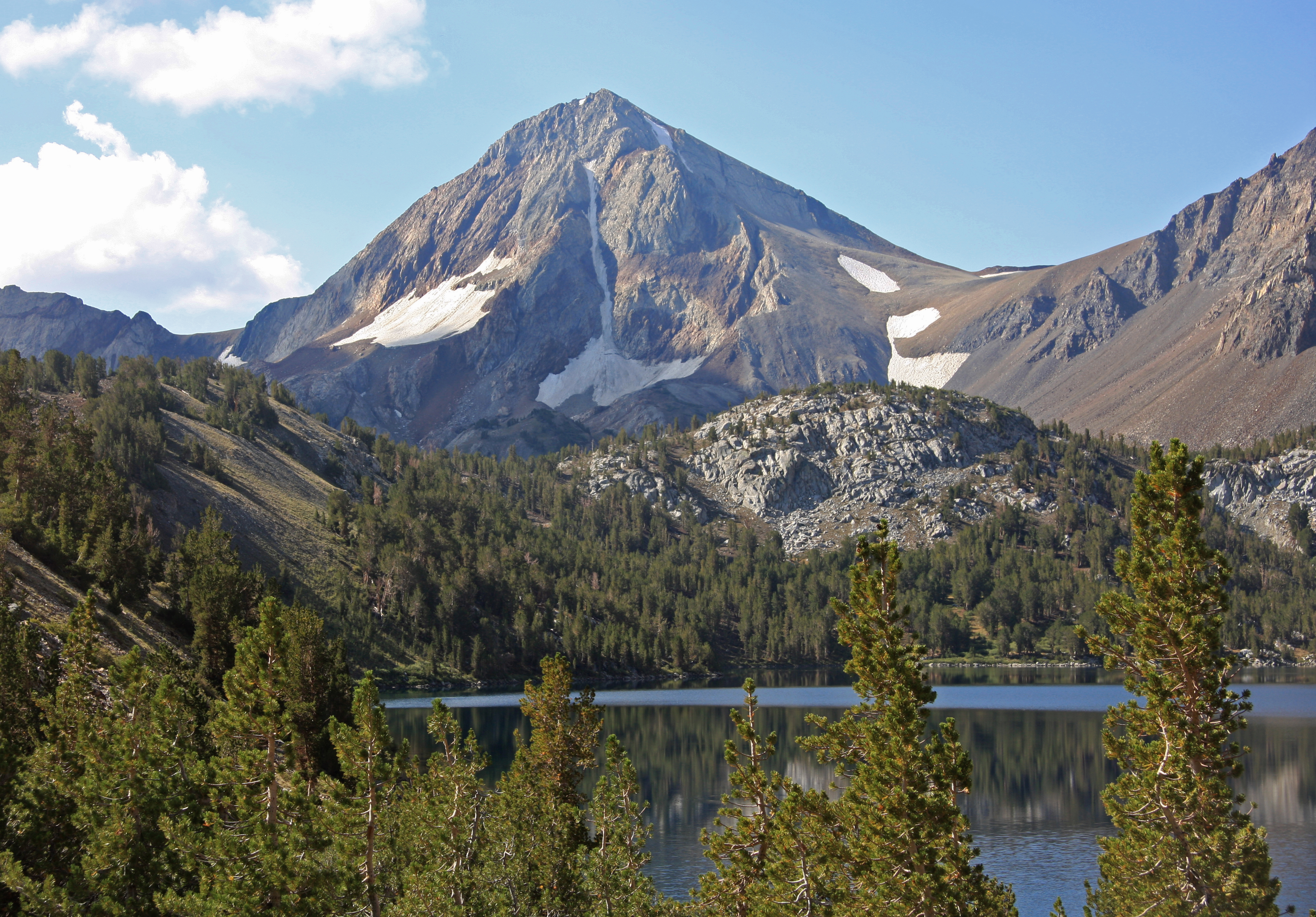
104. Red Slate Mountain in California's Sierra Nevada

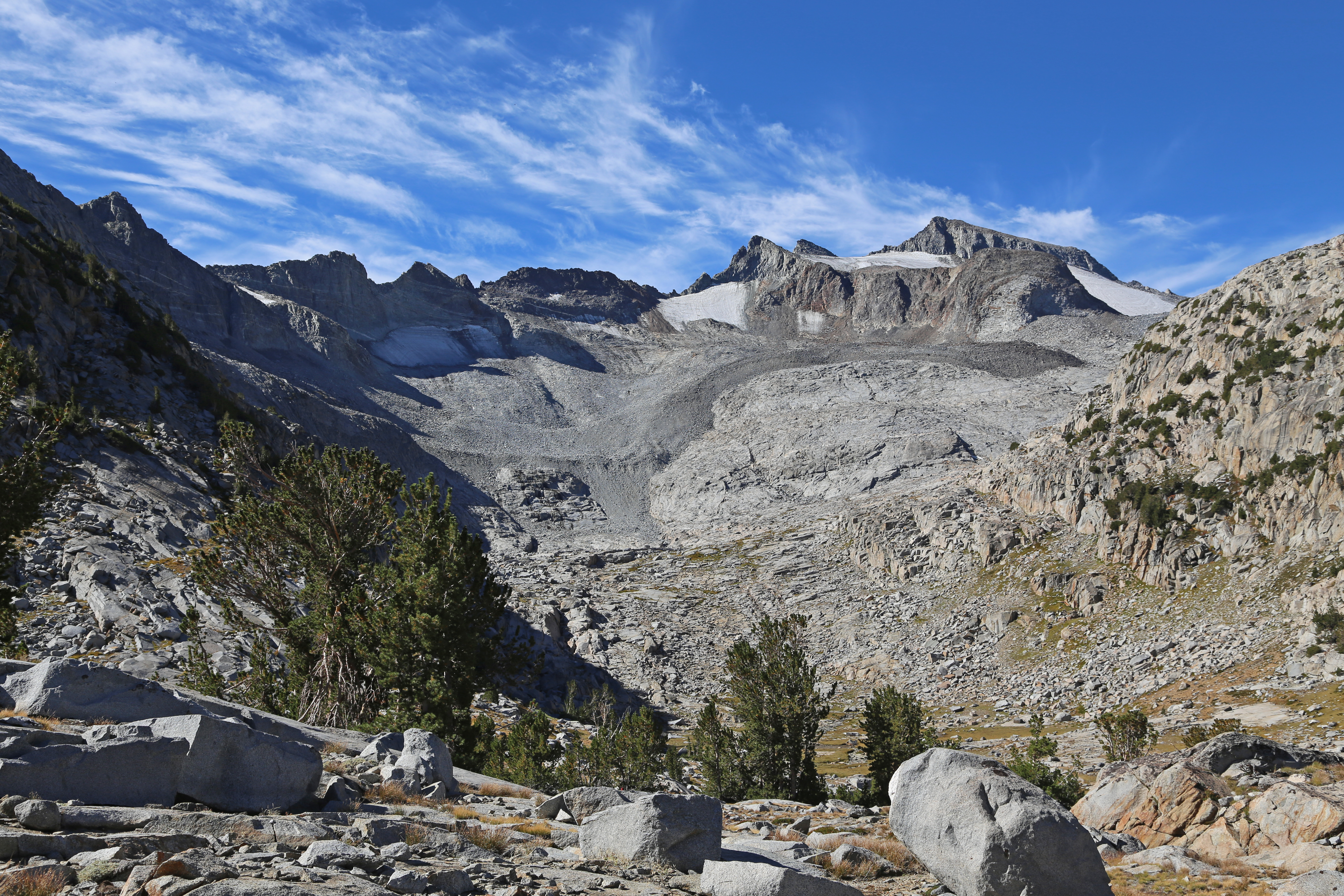
105. The summit of Mount Lyell is the highest point in Yosemite National Park.

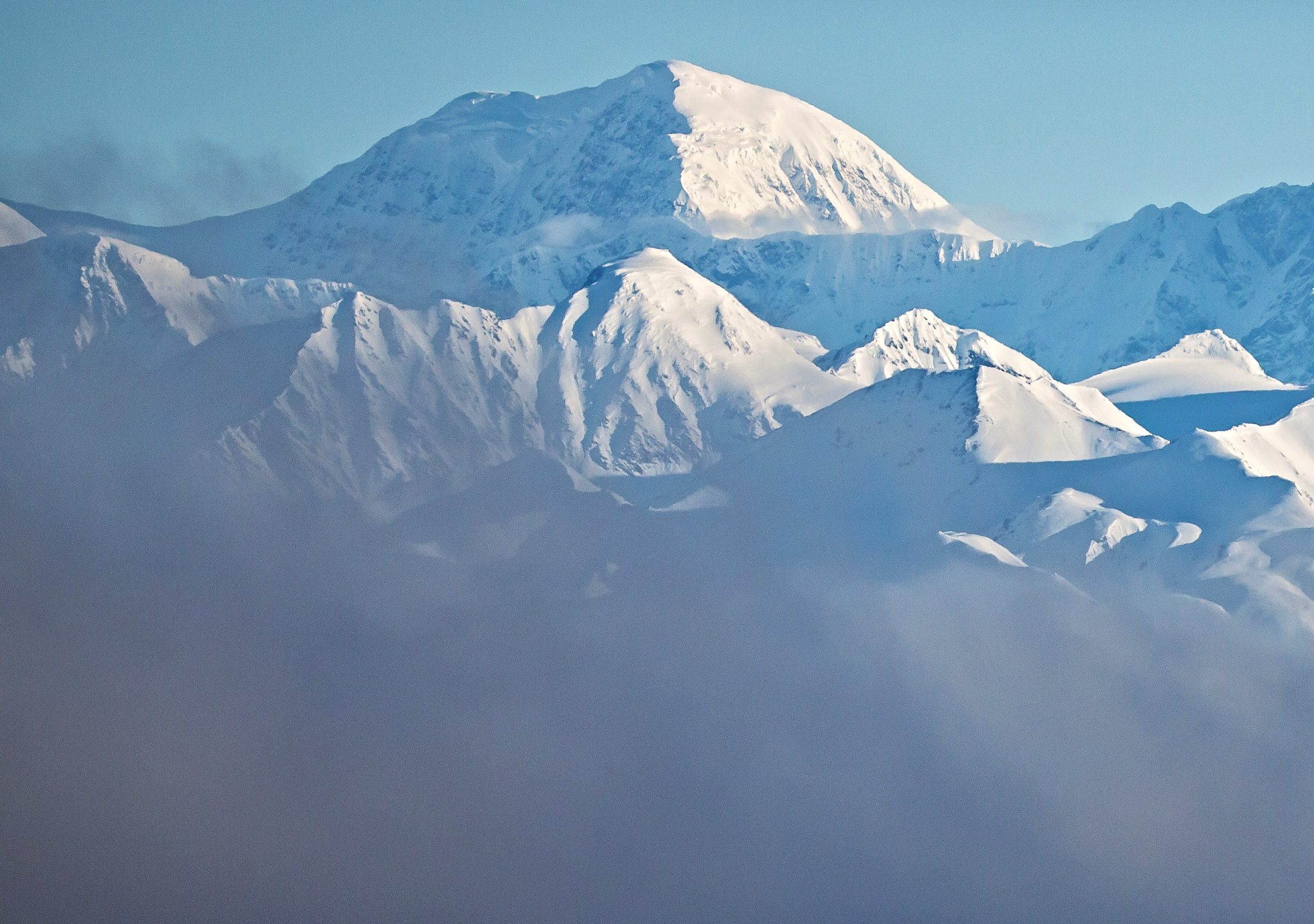
111. Mount Moffit in the Alaska Range

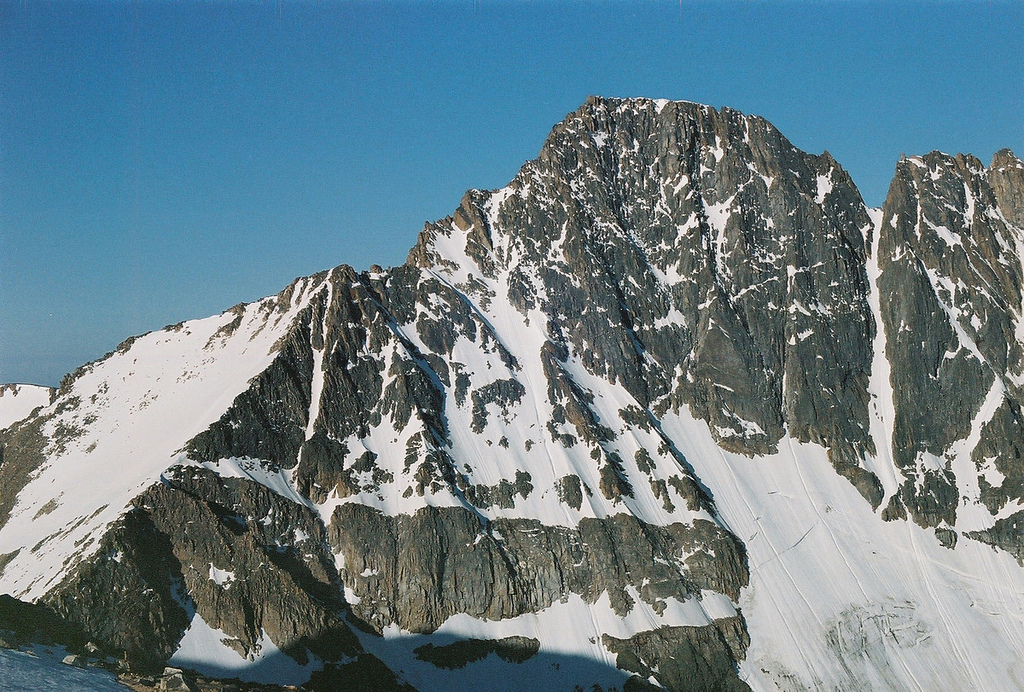
118. Granite Peak is the highest summit of the Beartooth Range and Montana.

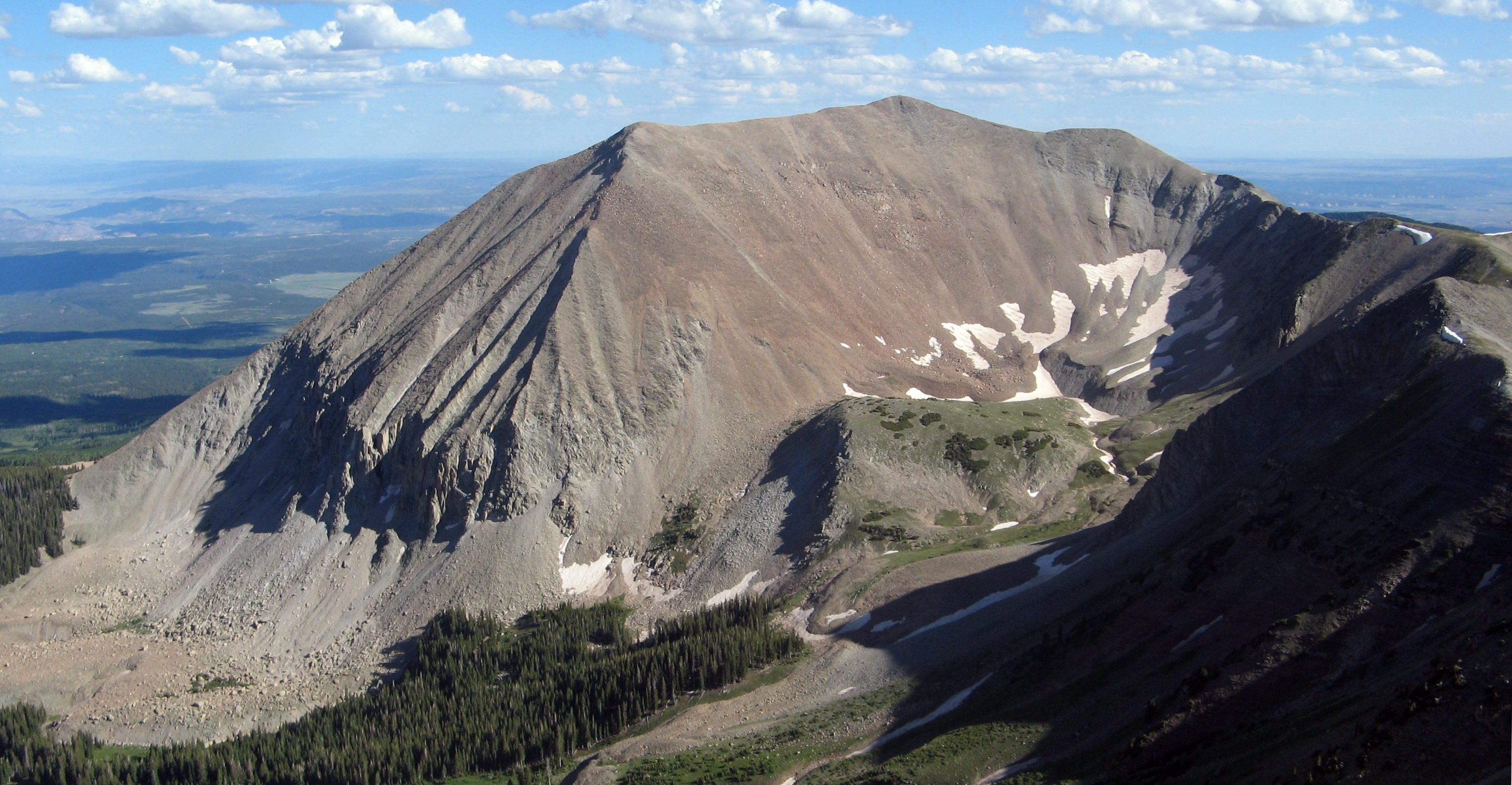
122. Mount Peale is the highest summit of Utah's La Sal Mountains.

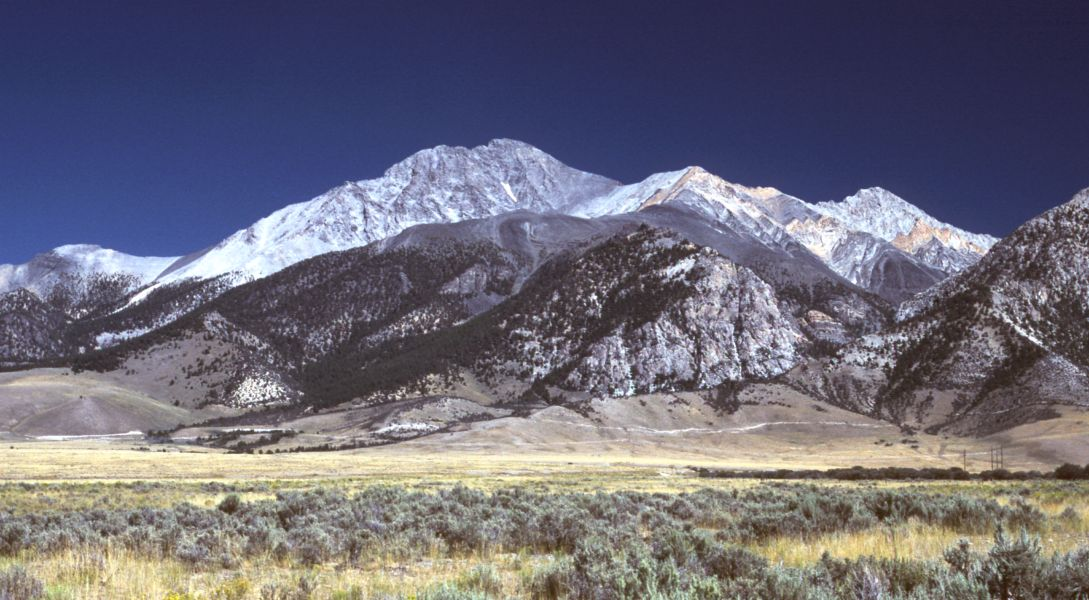
127. Borah Peak is the highest summit of the Lost River Range and Idaho.

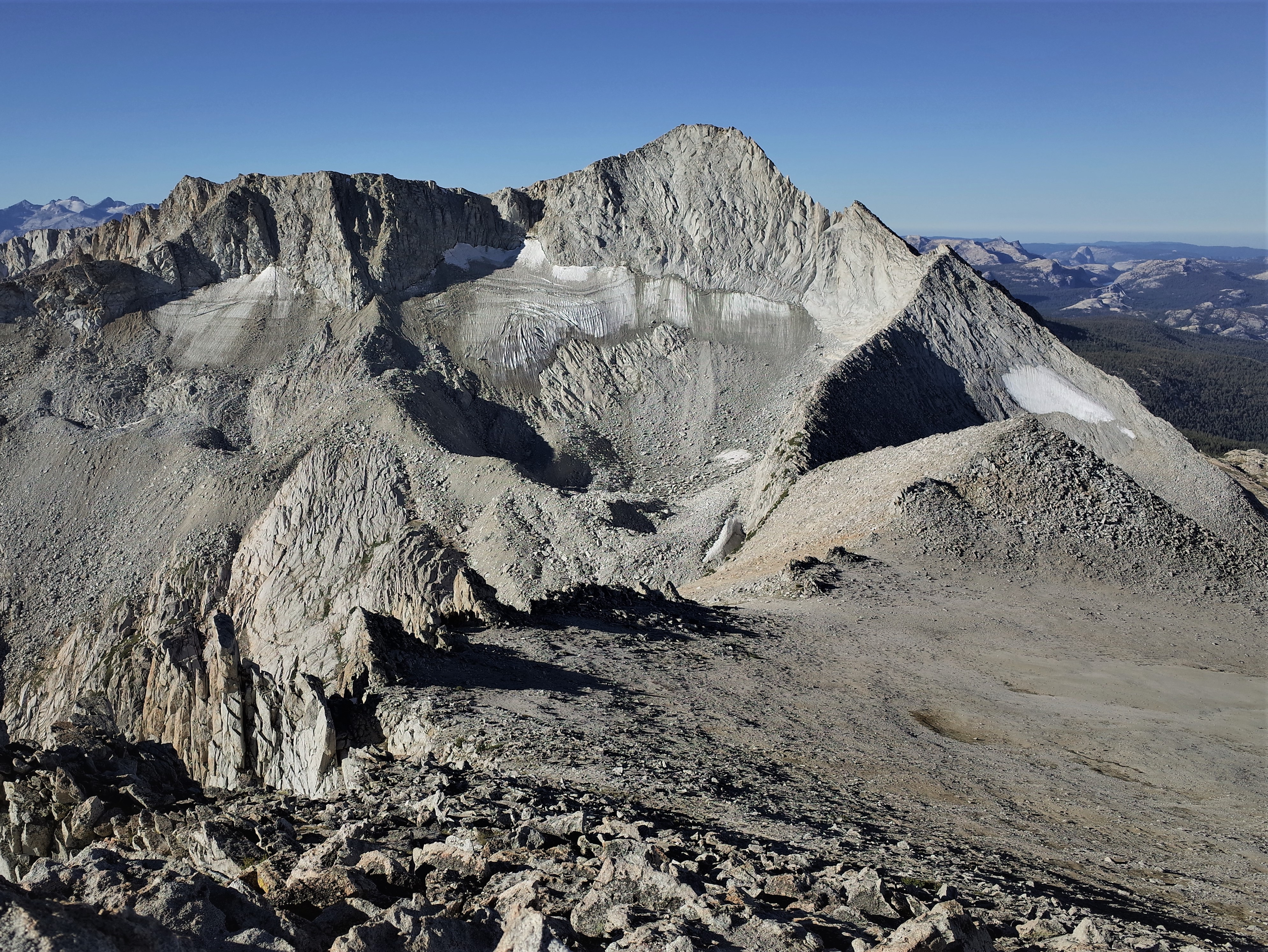
130. Mount Conness in California's Sierra Nevada

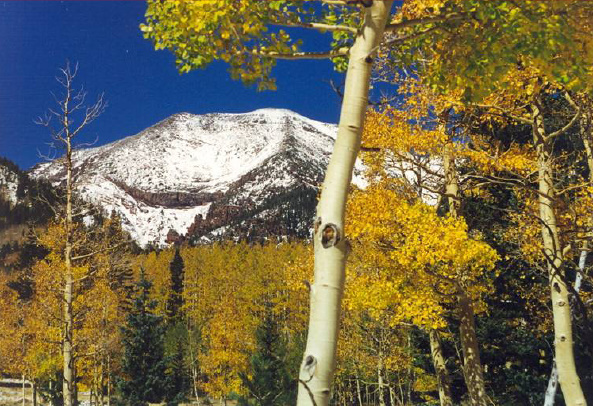
131. Humphreys Peak is the highest summit of the San Francisco Peaks and Arizona.

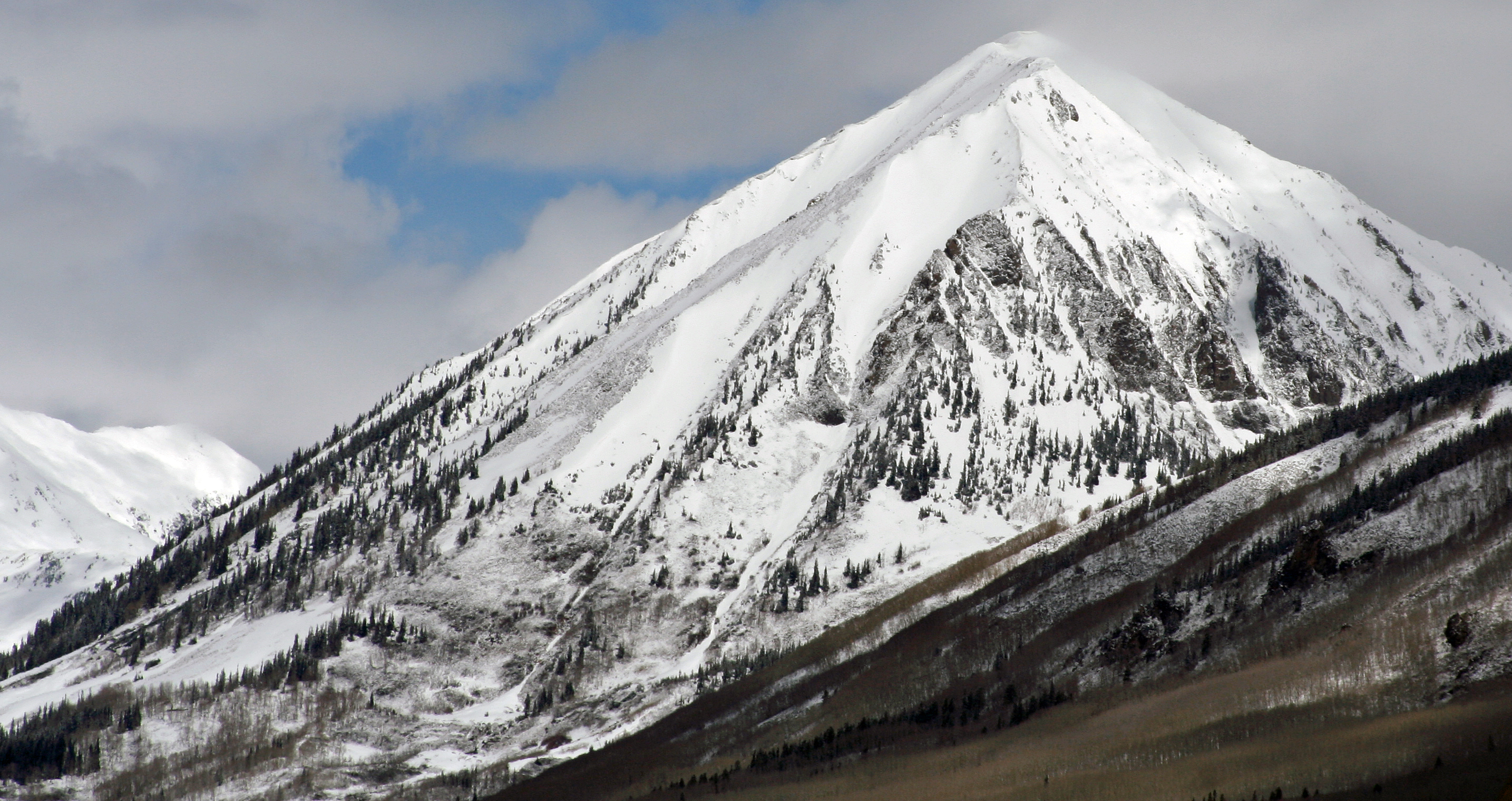
133. Gothic Mountain in Colorado's Elk Mountains

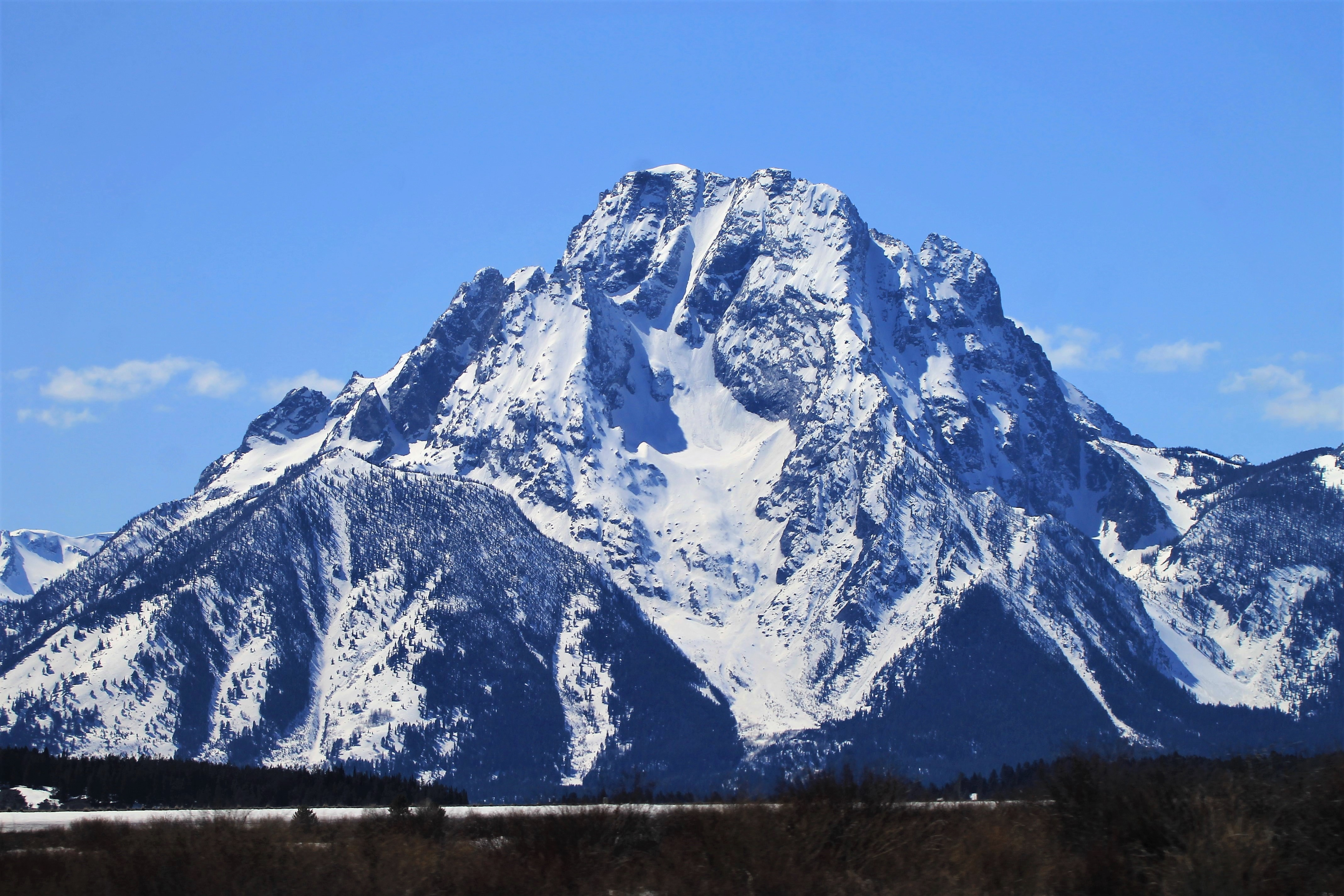
136. Mount Moran in Wyoming's Teton Range

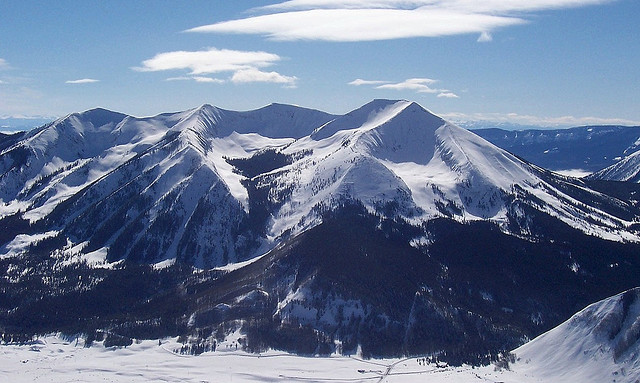
142. Whetstone Mountain in Colorado's West Elk Mountains

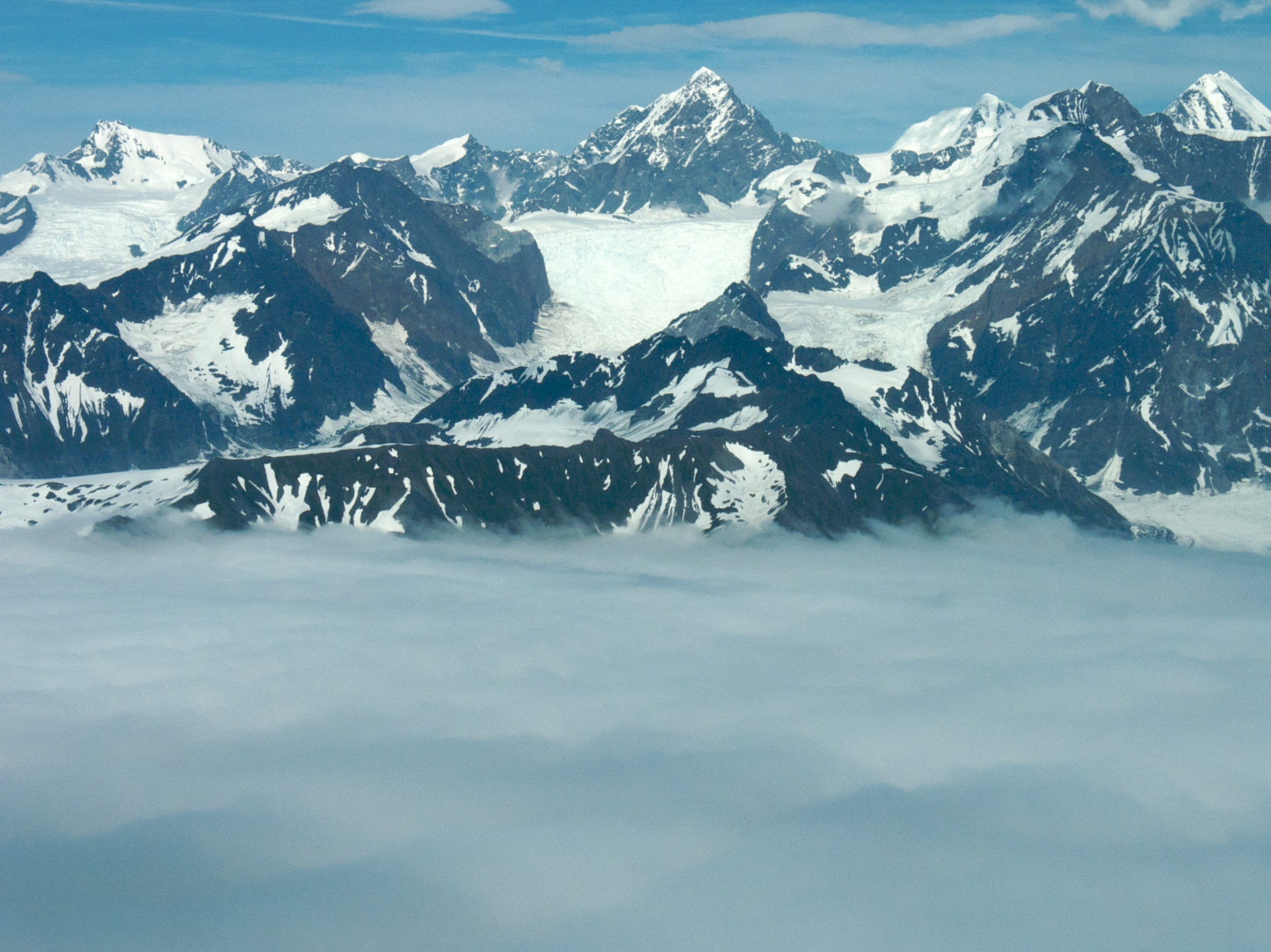
145. Mount Watson in the Fairweather Range of Alaska's Saint Elias Mountains

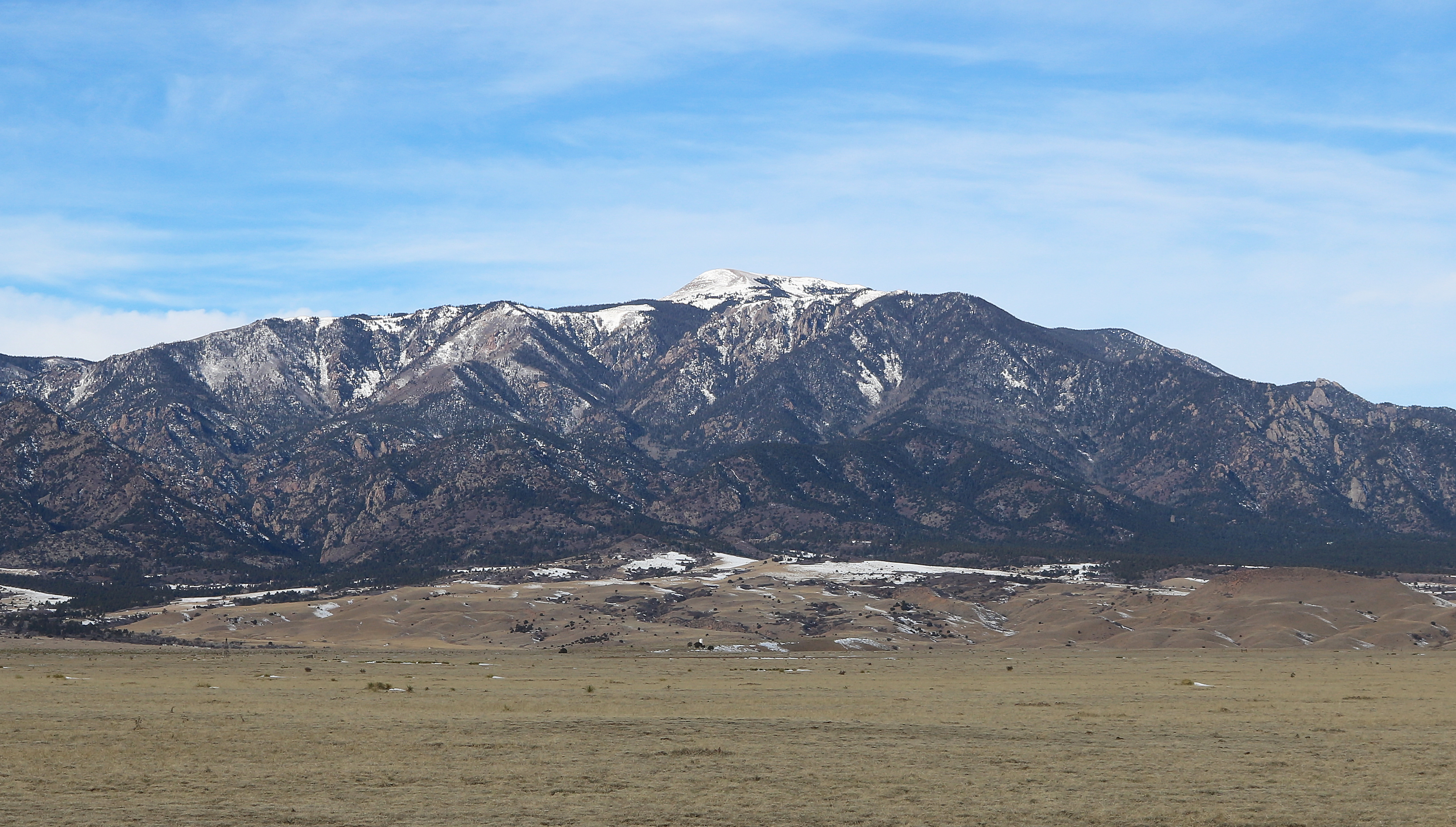
157. The summit of Greenhorn Mountain is the highest point in Colorado's Wet Mountains.

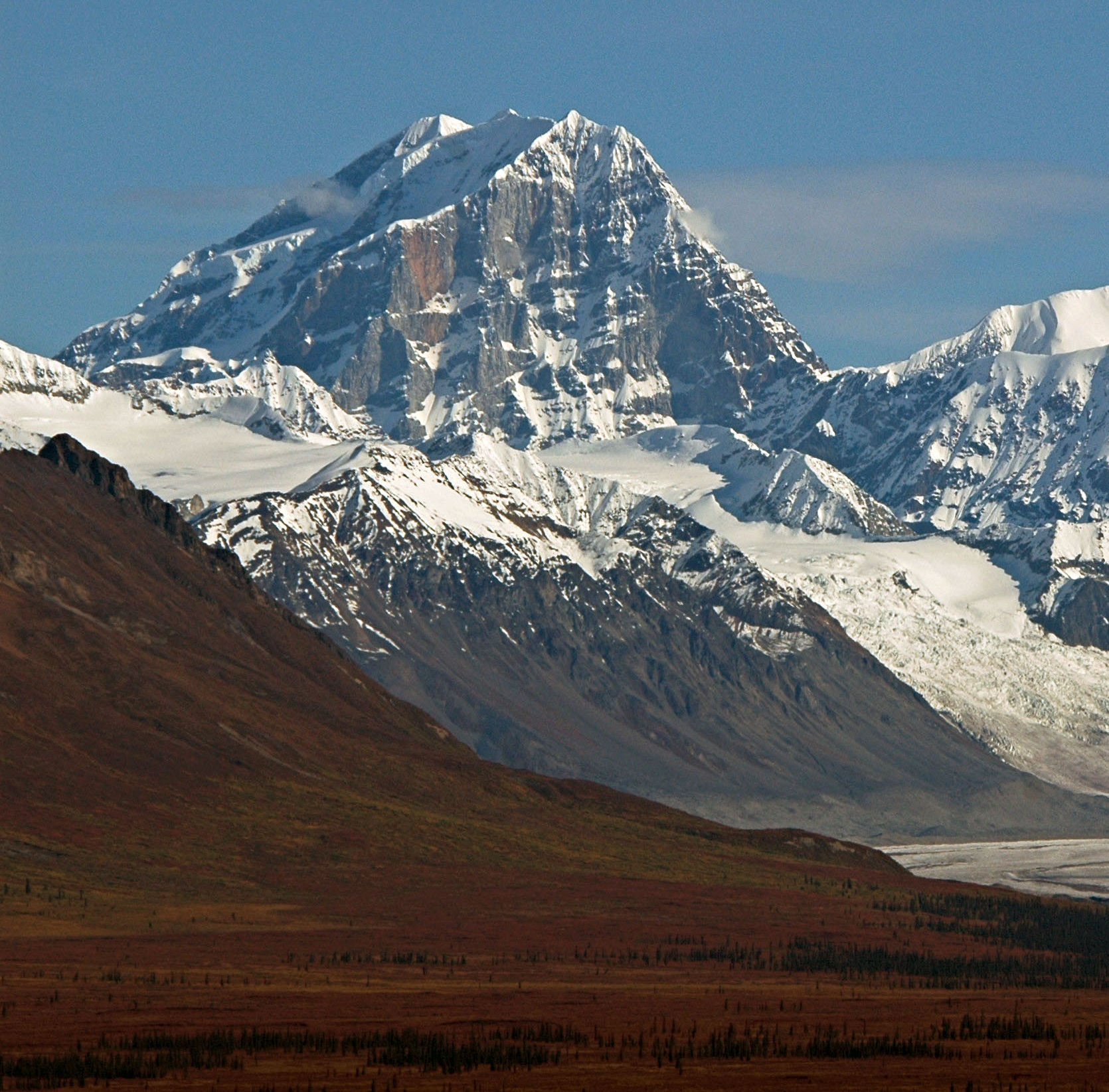
159. Mount Deborah in the eastern Alaska Range

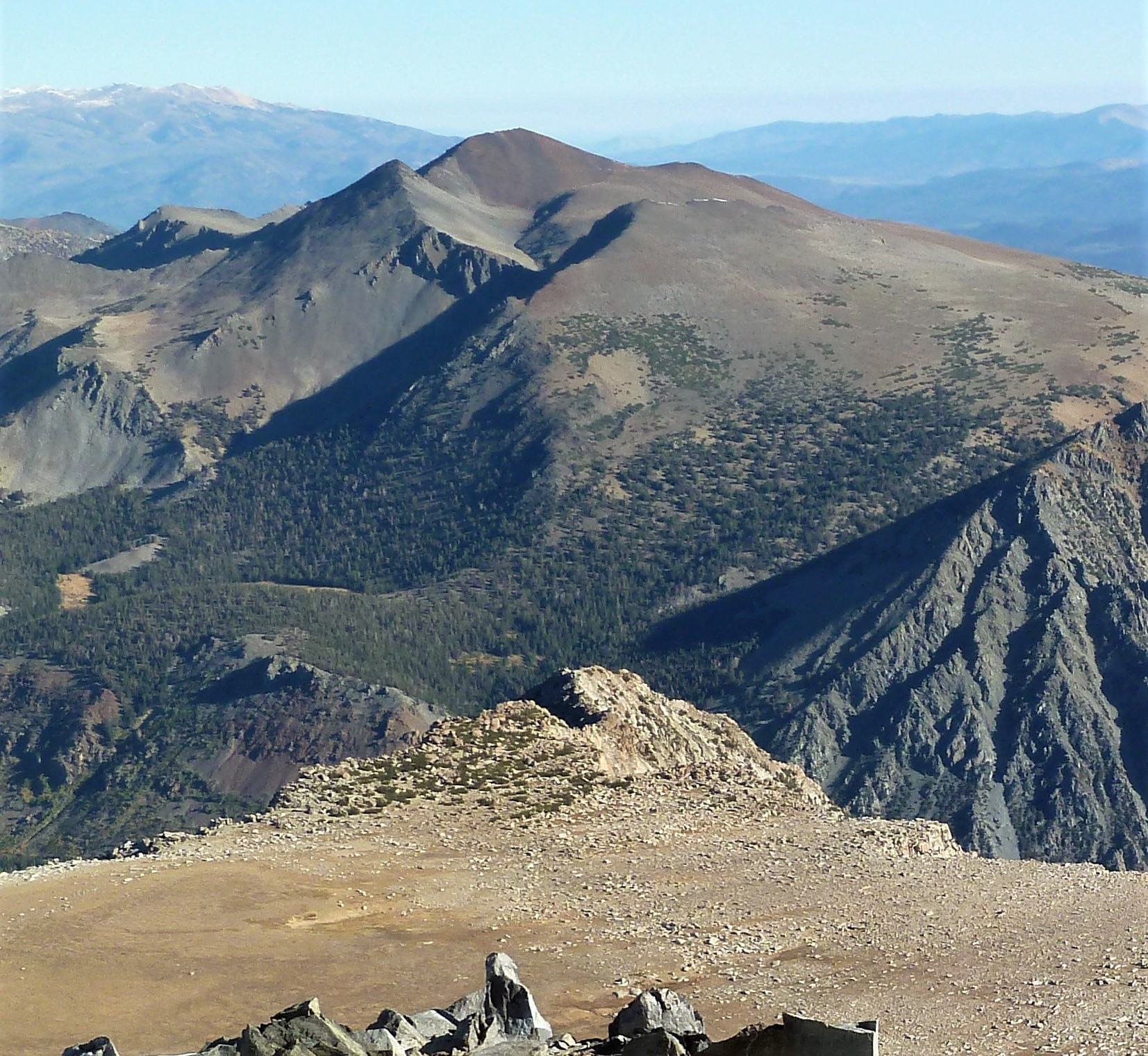
160. Mount Warren in Mono County, California

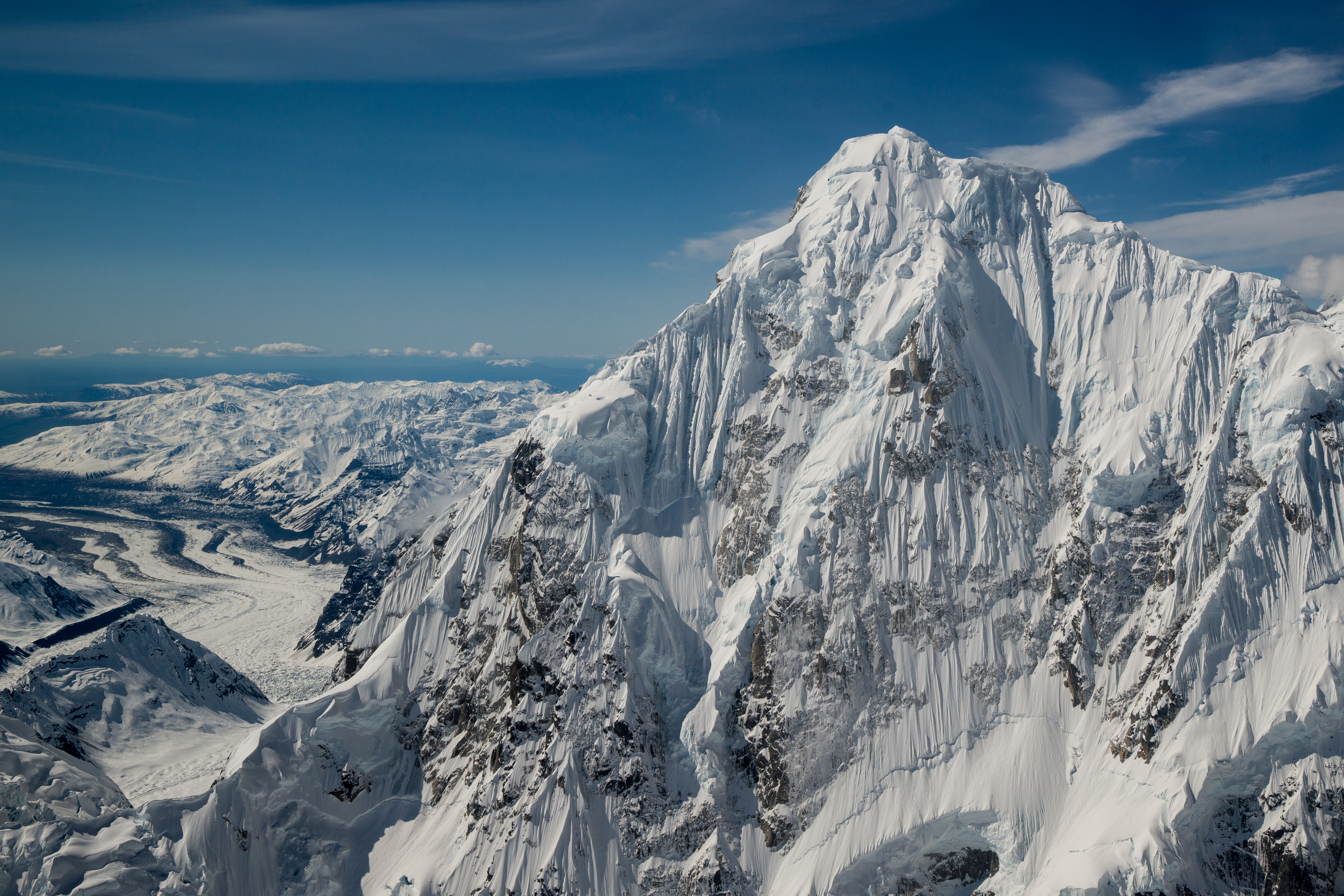
168. Mount Huntington in the central Alaska Range

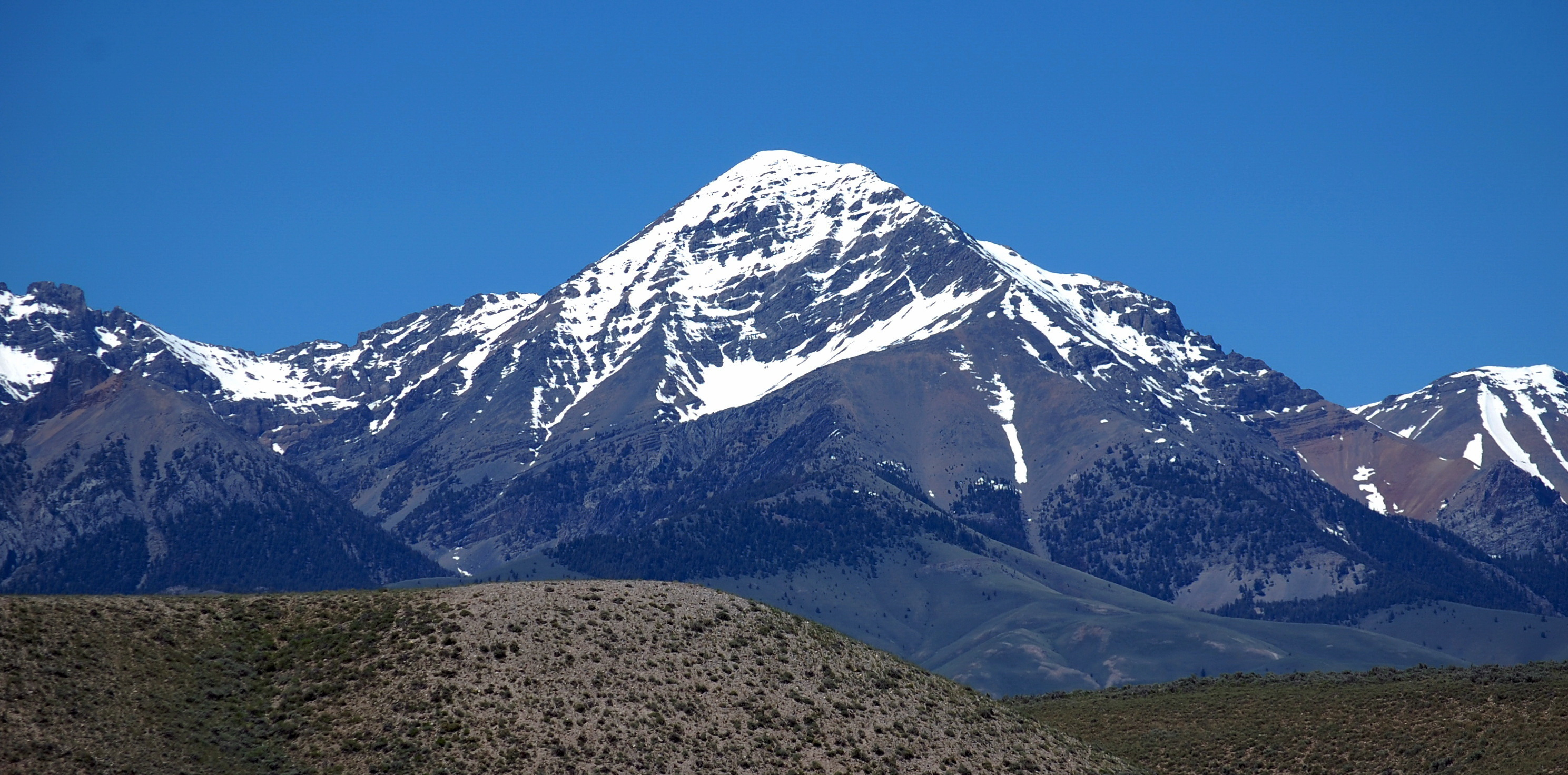
171. Diamond Peak is the highest summit of Idaho's Lemhi Range.

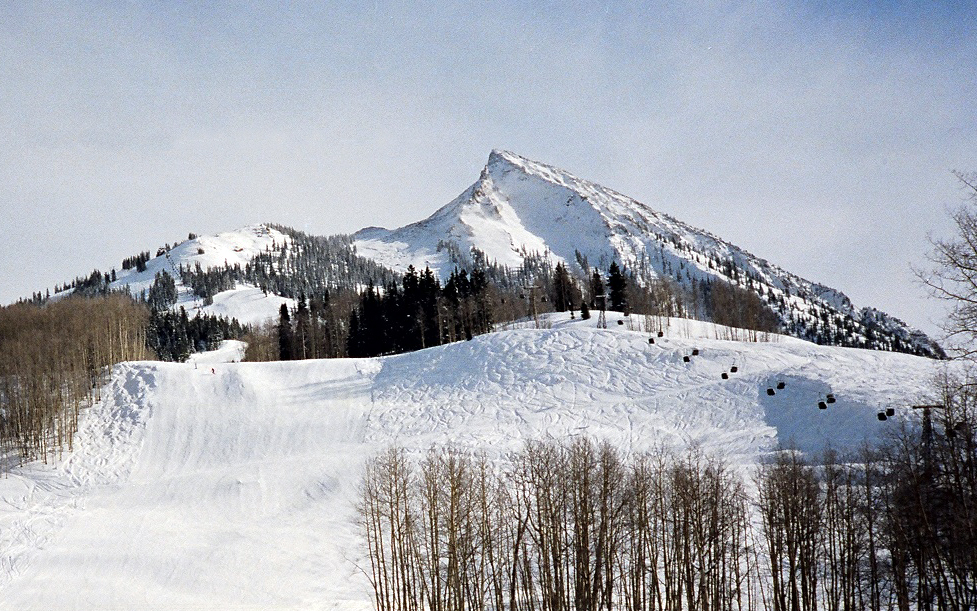
177. Crested Butte

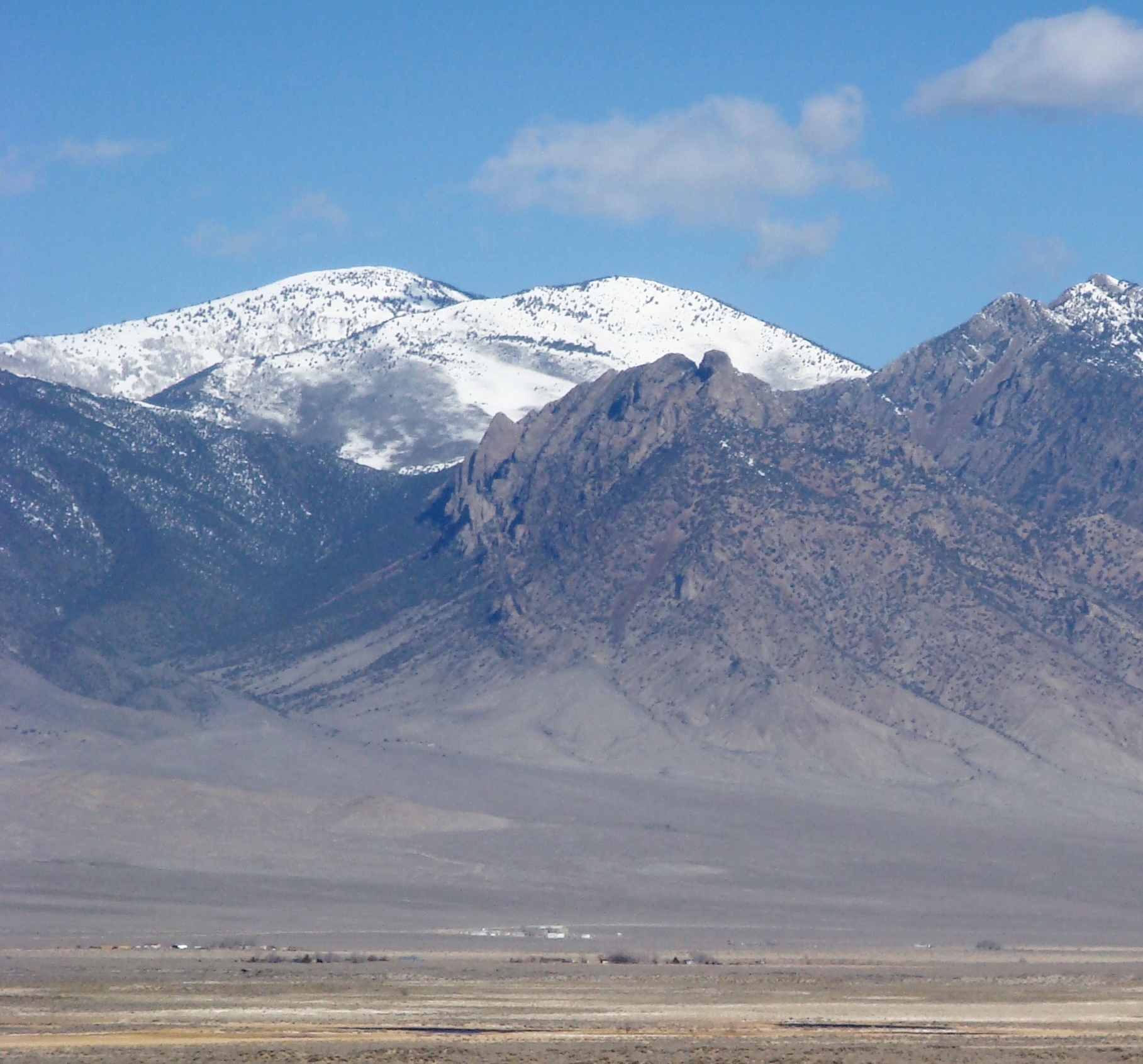
184. Ibapah Peak is the highest summit of Utah's Deep Creek Range.

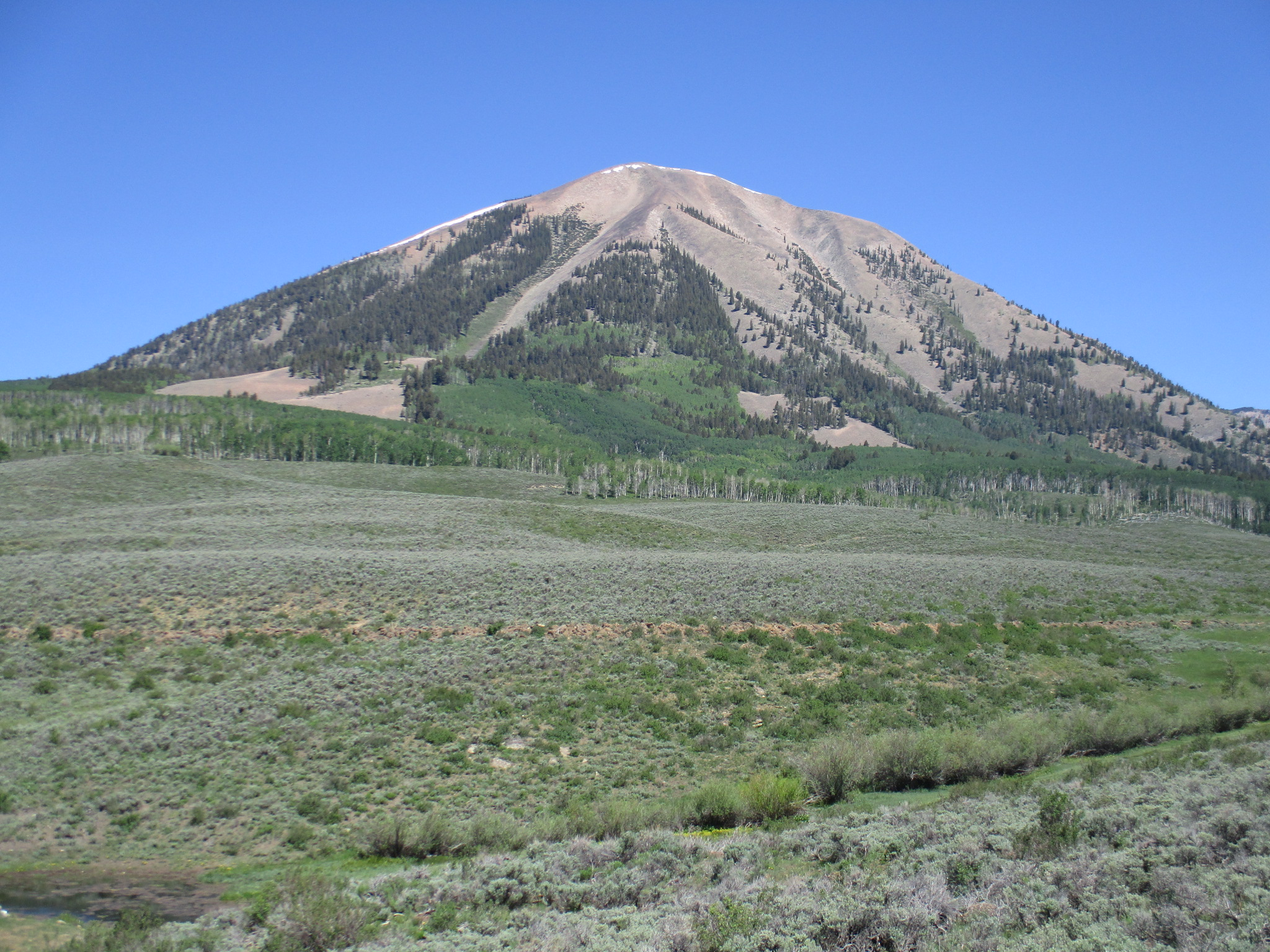
185. Carbon Peak in Gunnison County, Colorado

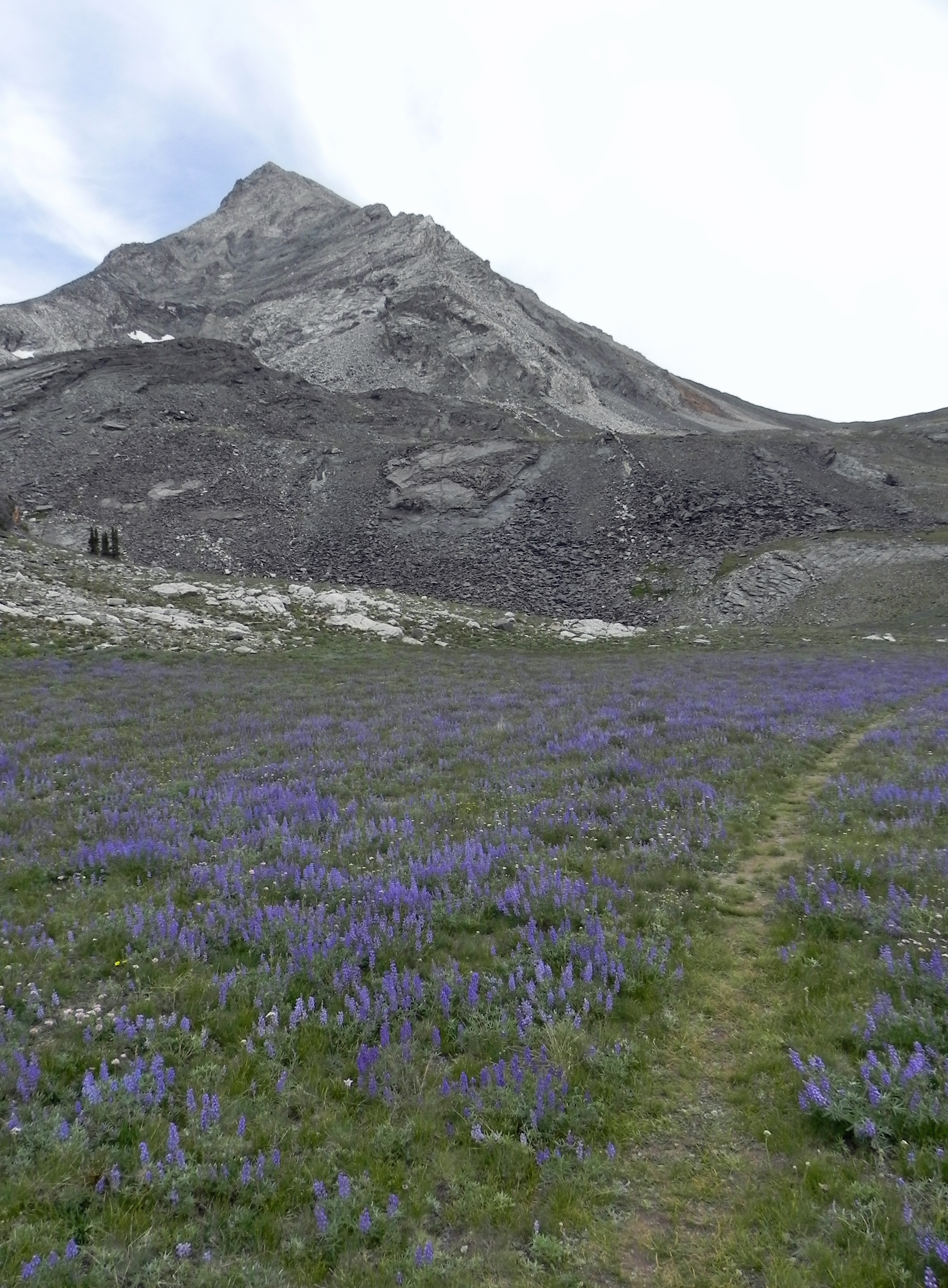
193. The summit of Hyndman Peak is the highest point in Idaho's Pioneer Mountains.

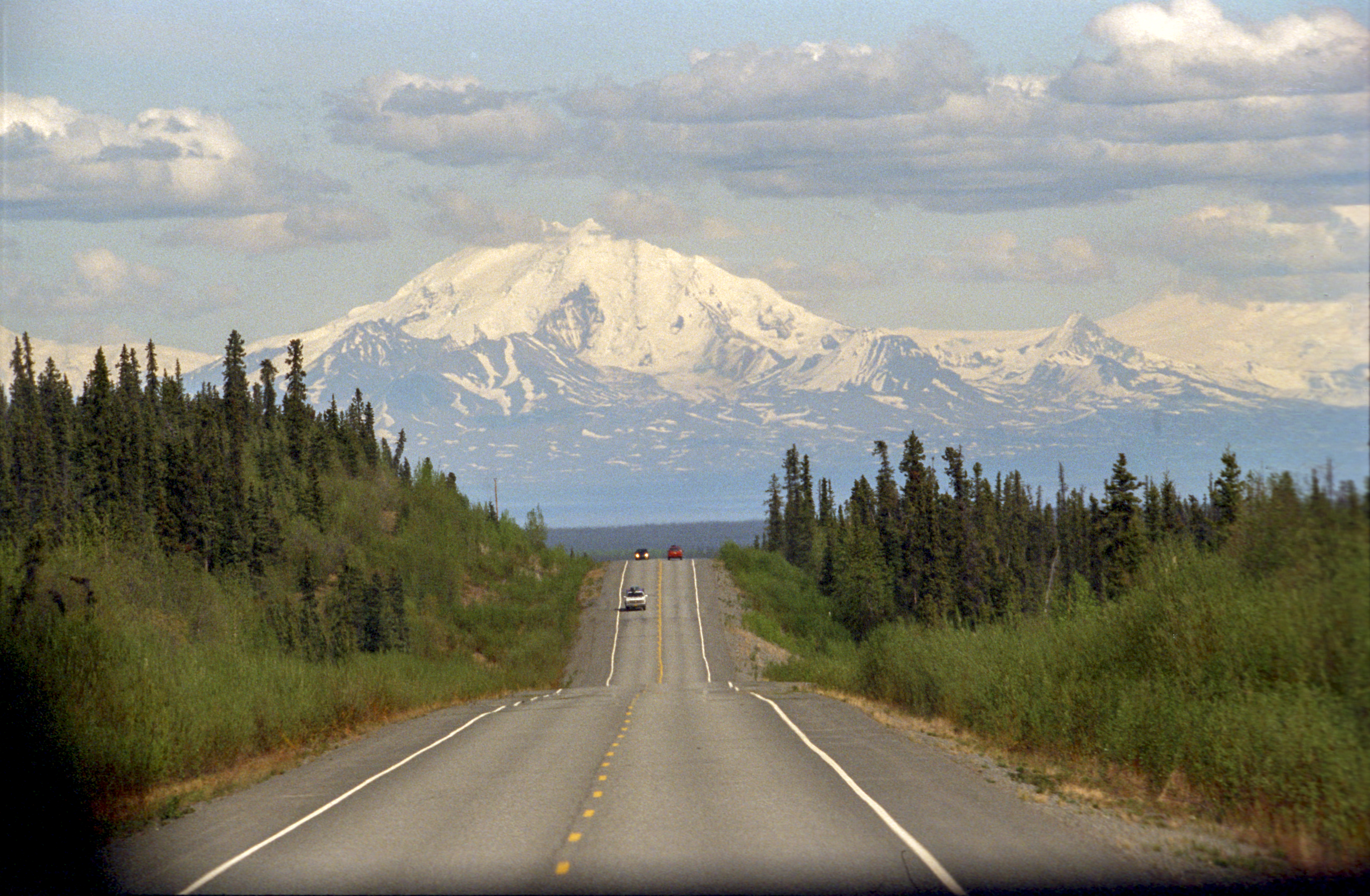
196. Mount Drum in Alaska's Wrangell Mountains

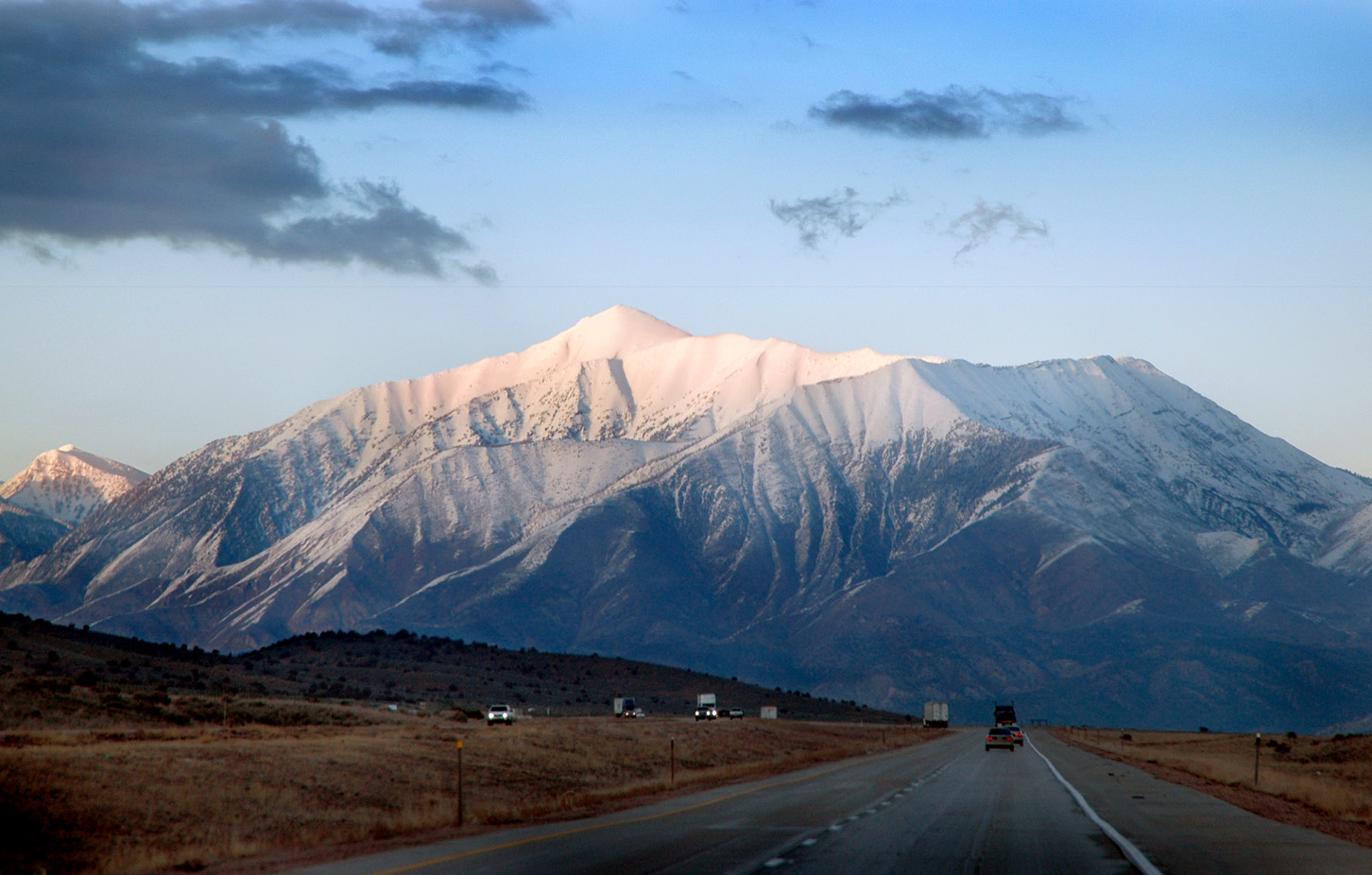
206. Mount Nebo is the highest summit of Utah's Wasatch Range.

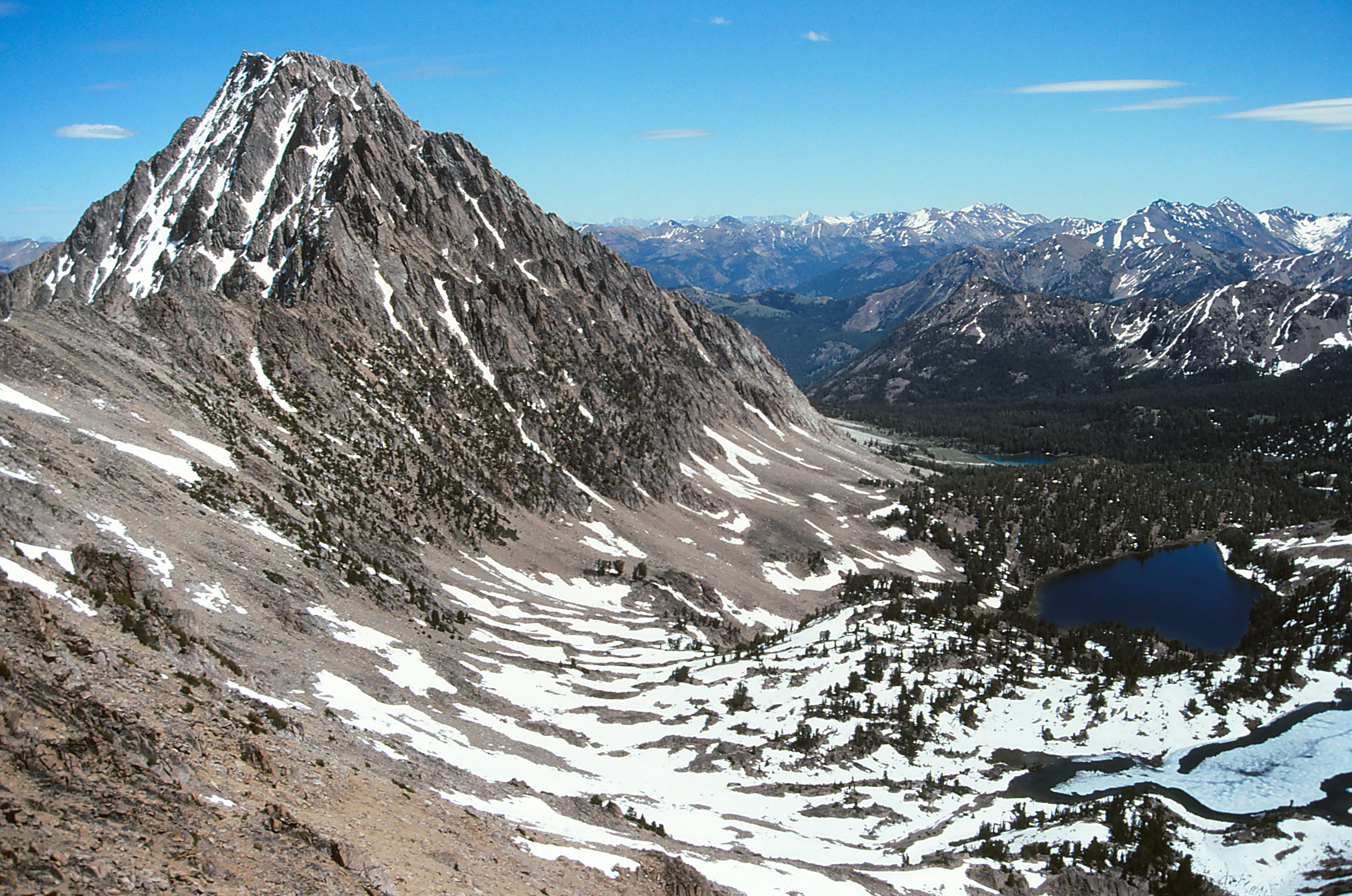
217. Castle Peak is the highest summit of Idaho's White Cloud Mountains.

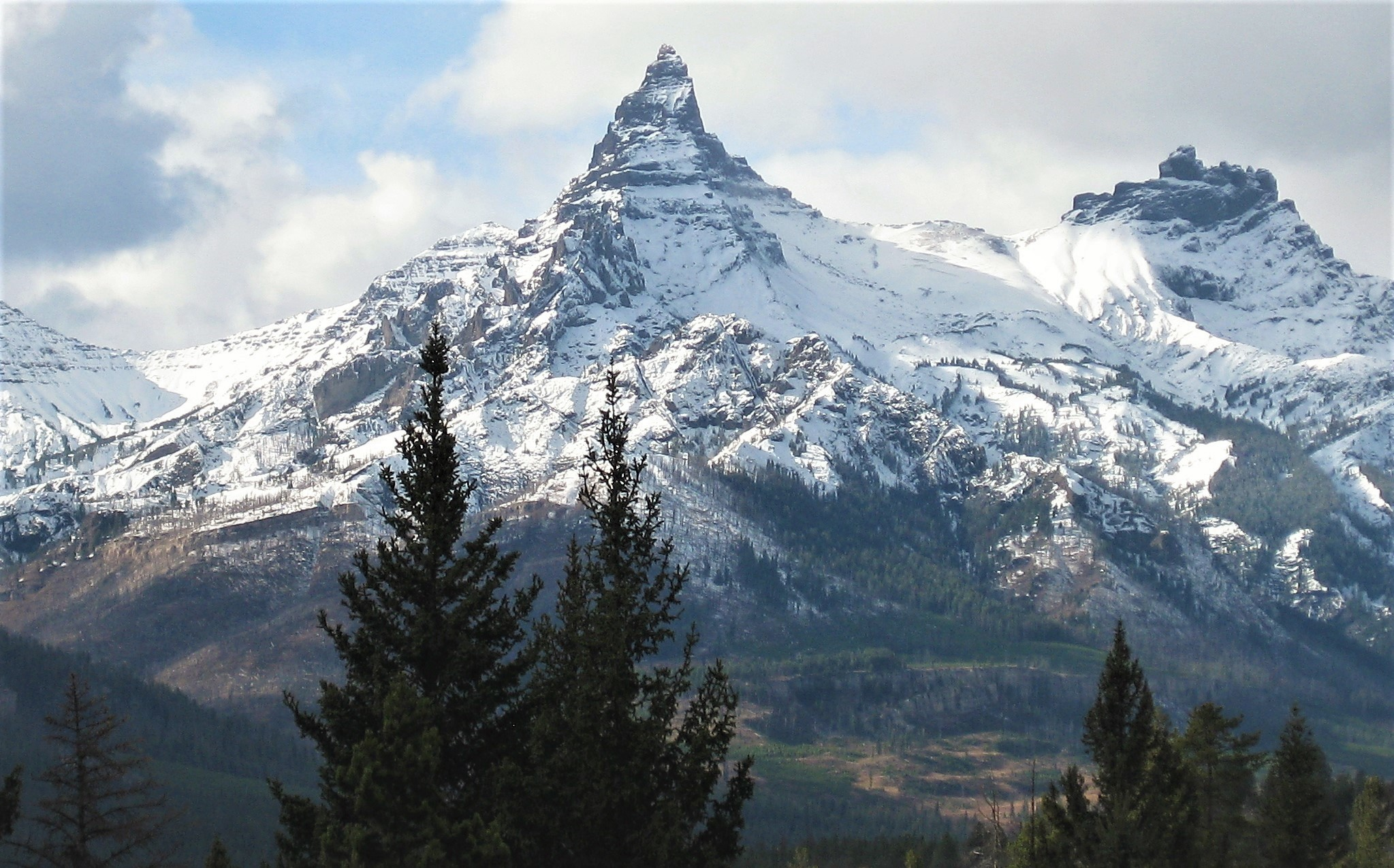
226. Pilot Peak is near the northeast corner of Yellowstone National Park in Wyoming.

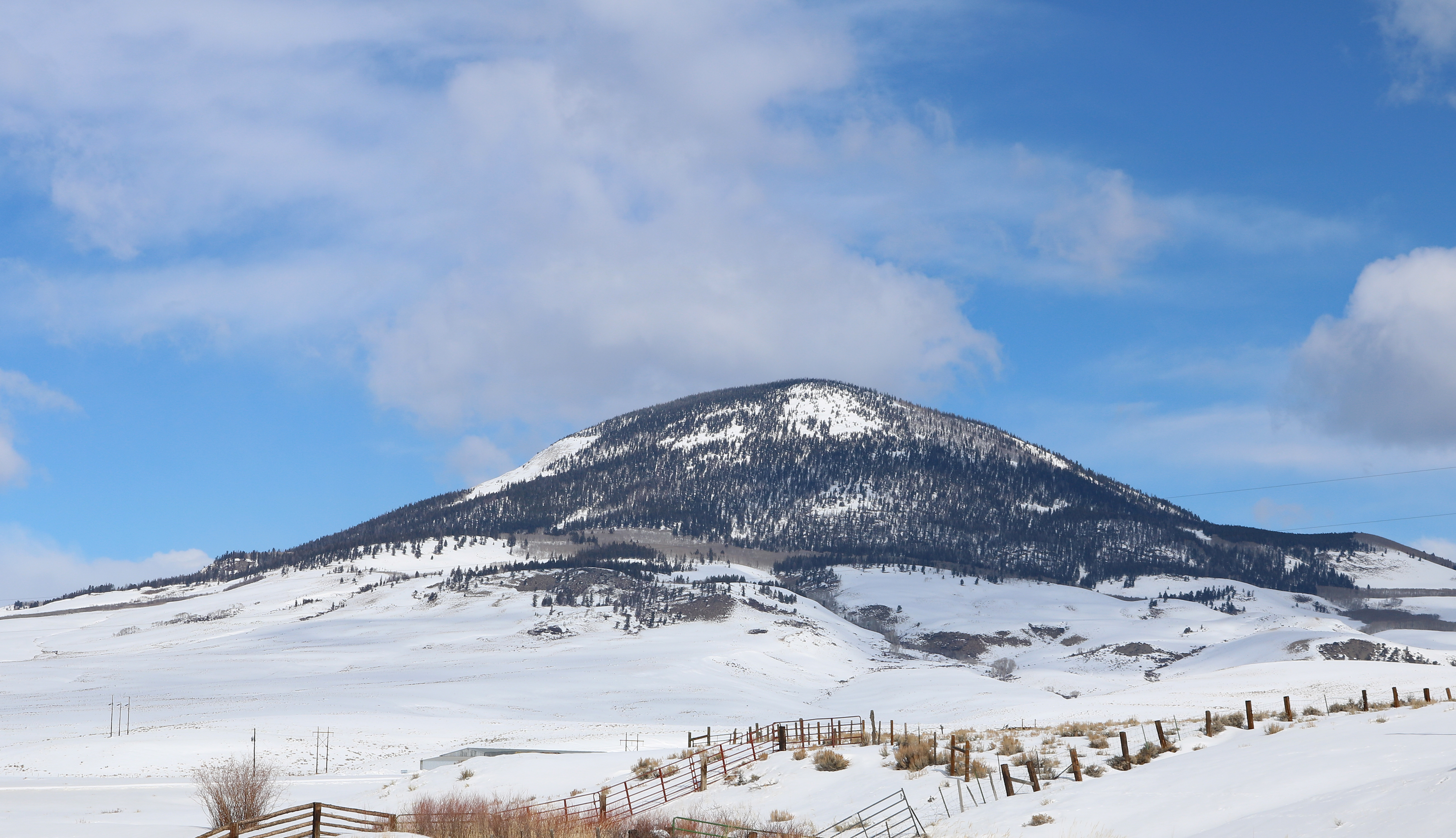
249. Tomichi Dome in Gunnison County, Colorado

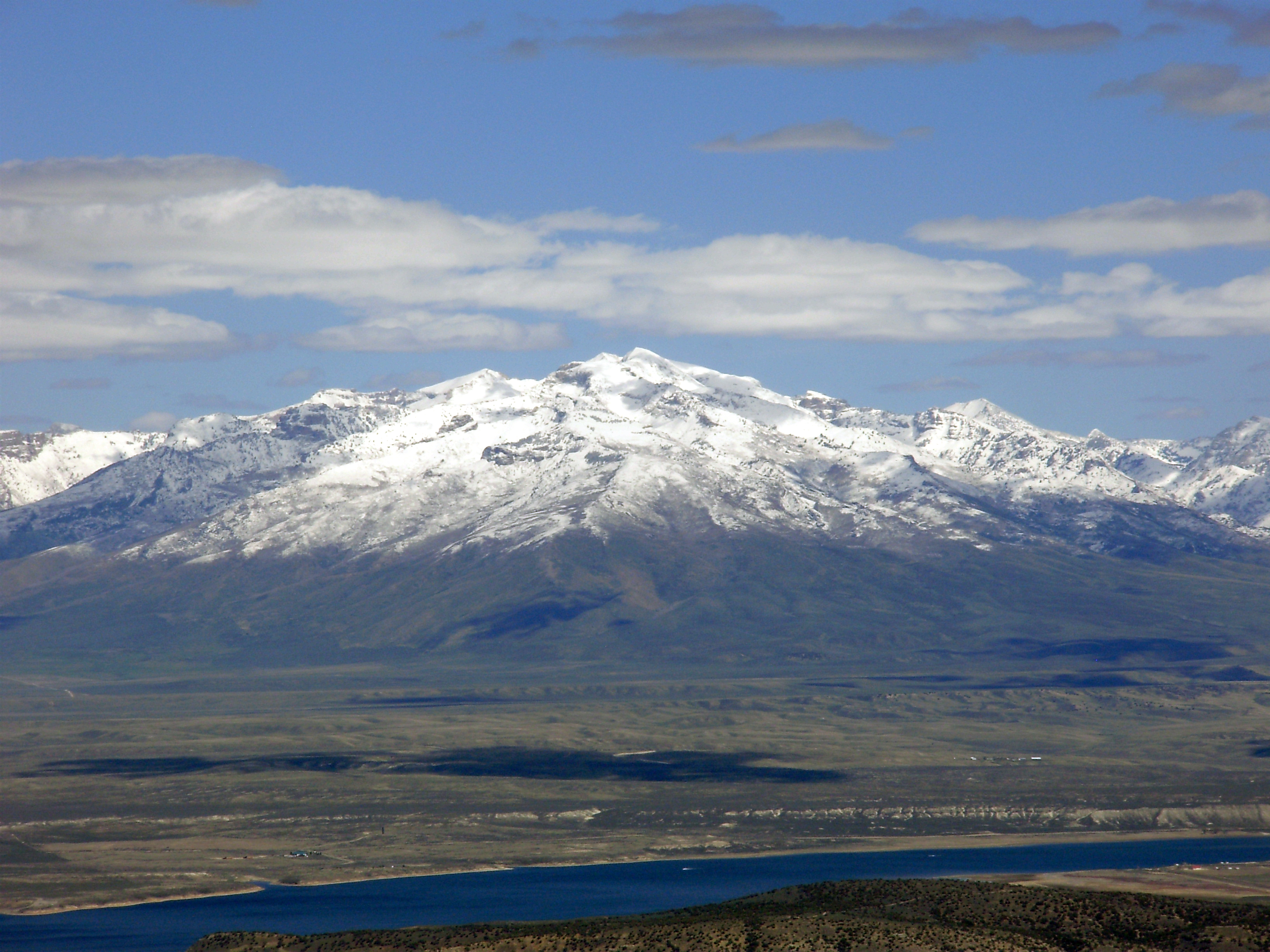
260. Ruby Dome is the highest summit of Nevada's Ruby Mountains.

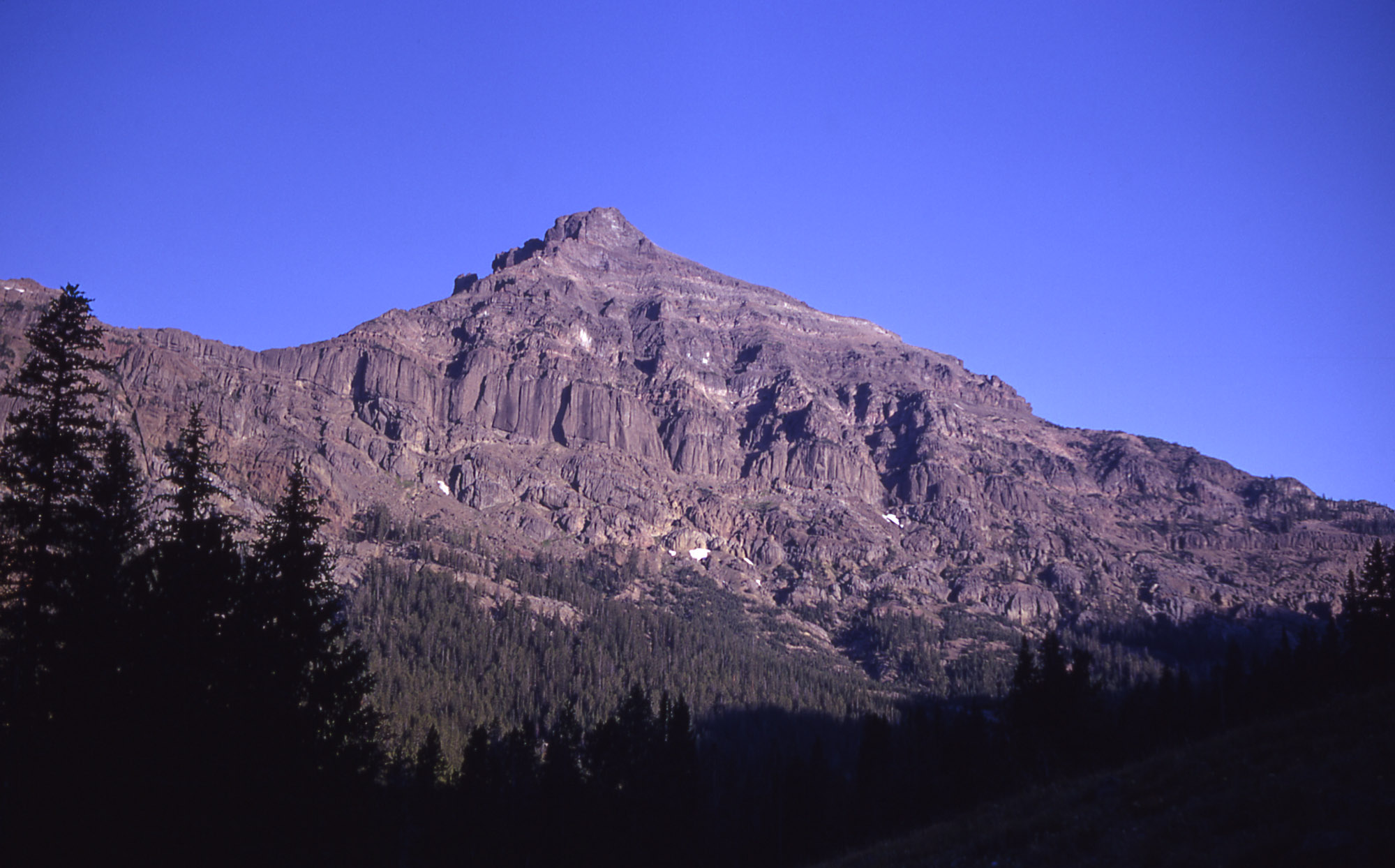
261. The summit of Eagle Peak is the highest point in Yellowstone National Park.

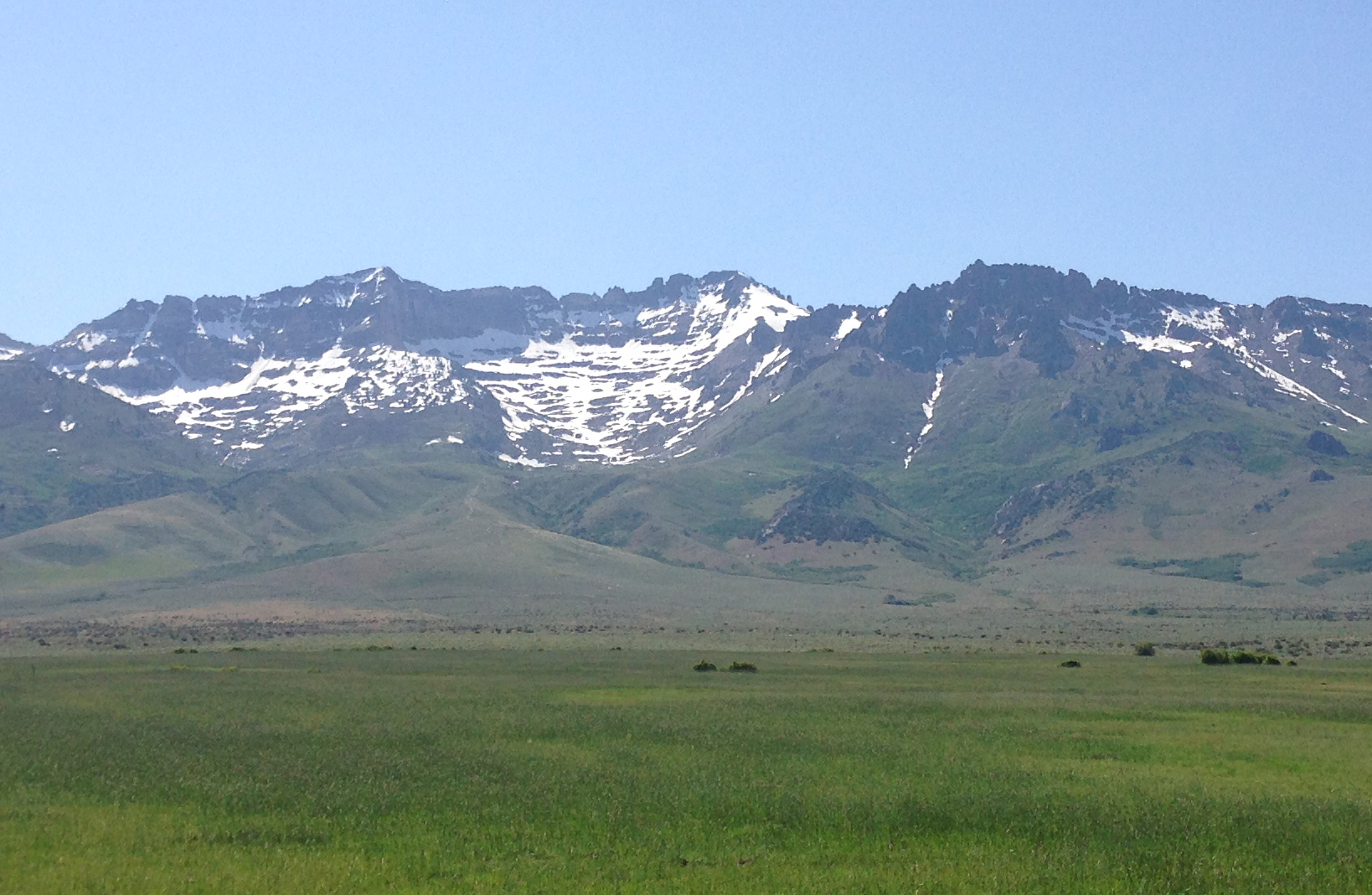
272. Hole in the Mountain Peak is the highest summit of Nevada's East Humboldt Range.

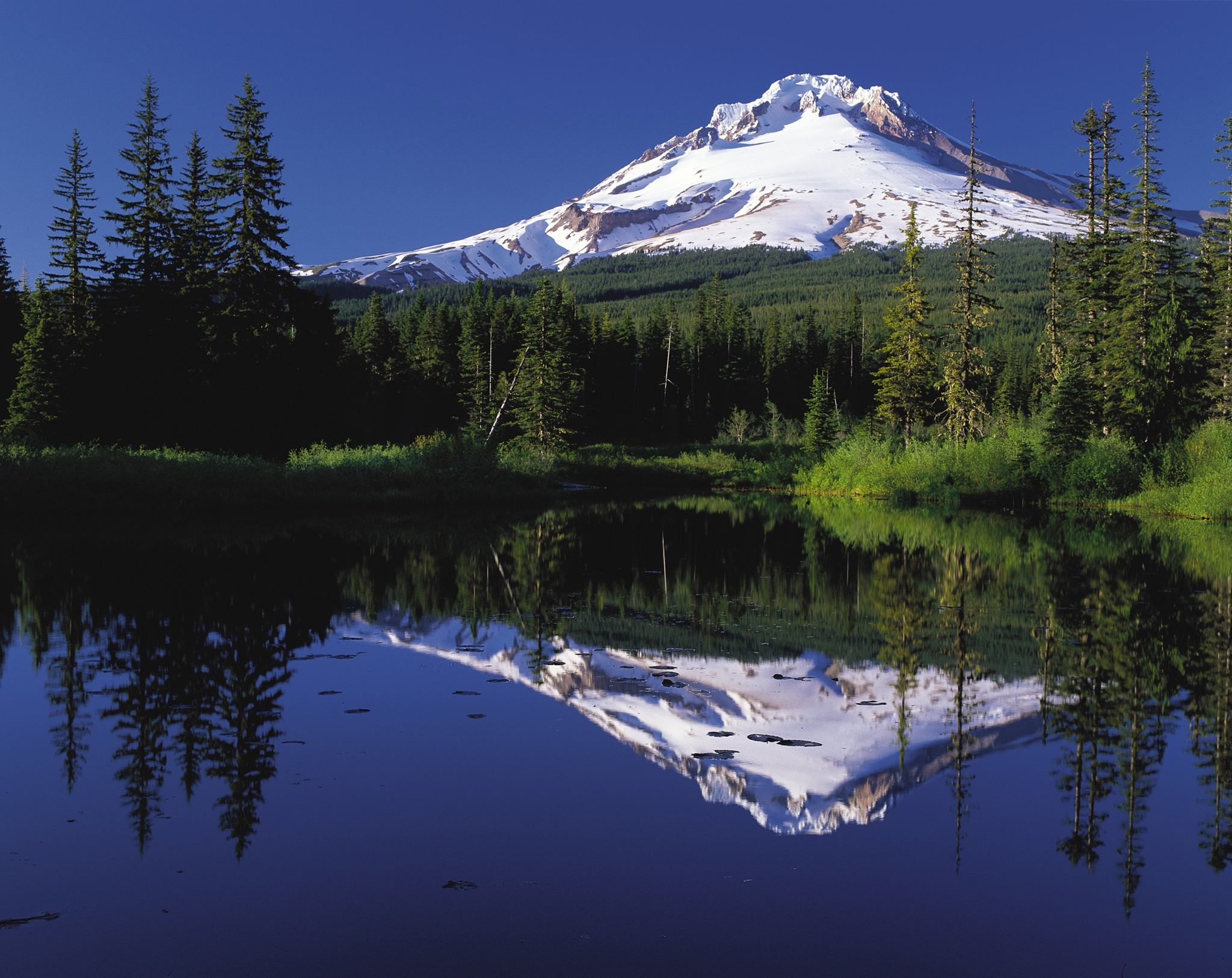
284. Mount Hood is the highest summit of Oregon.

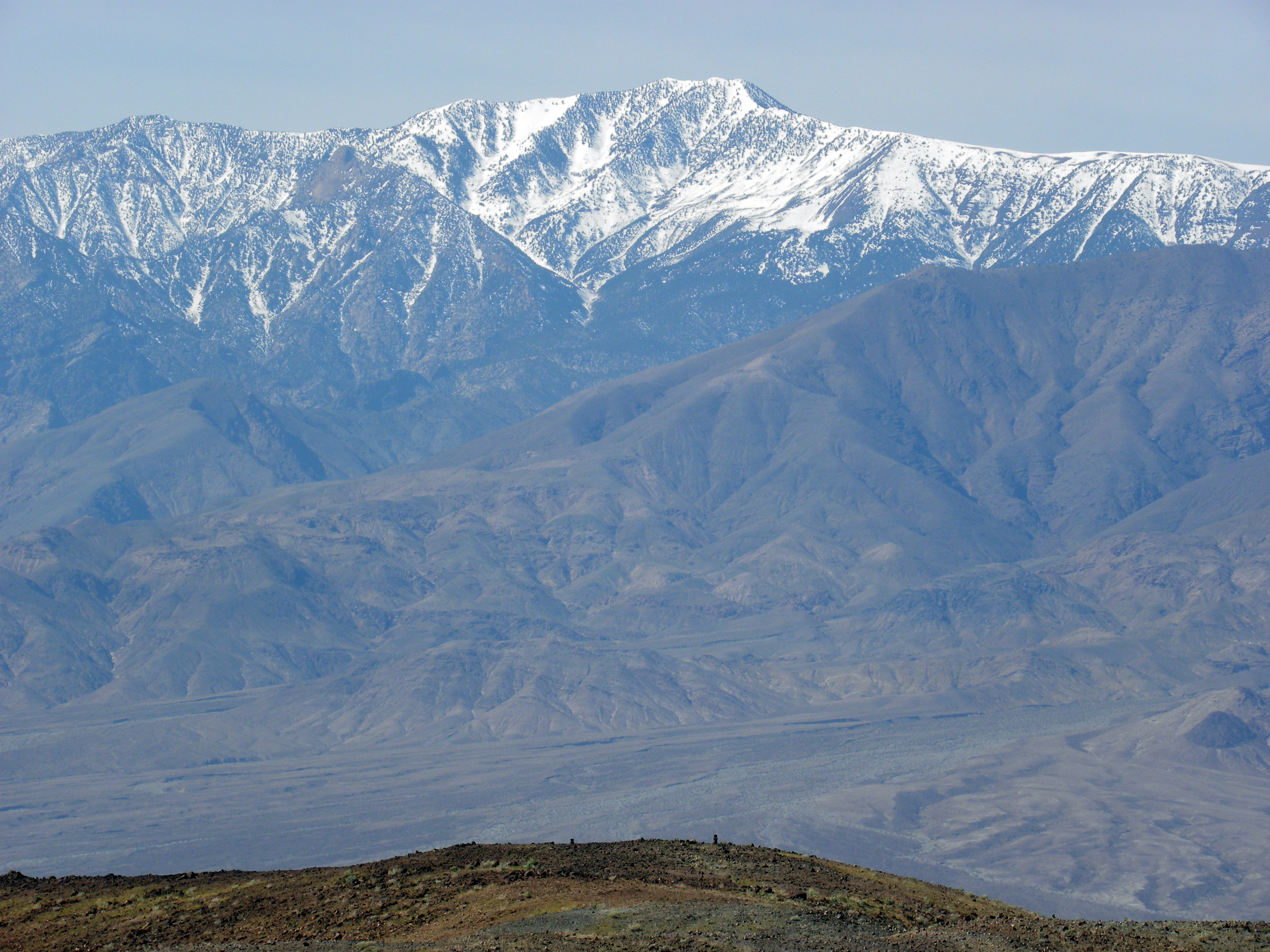
308. Telescope Peak is the highest summit of California's Panamint Range and Death Valley National Park.

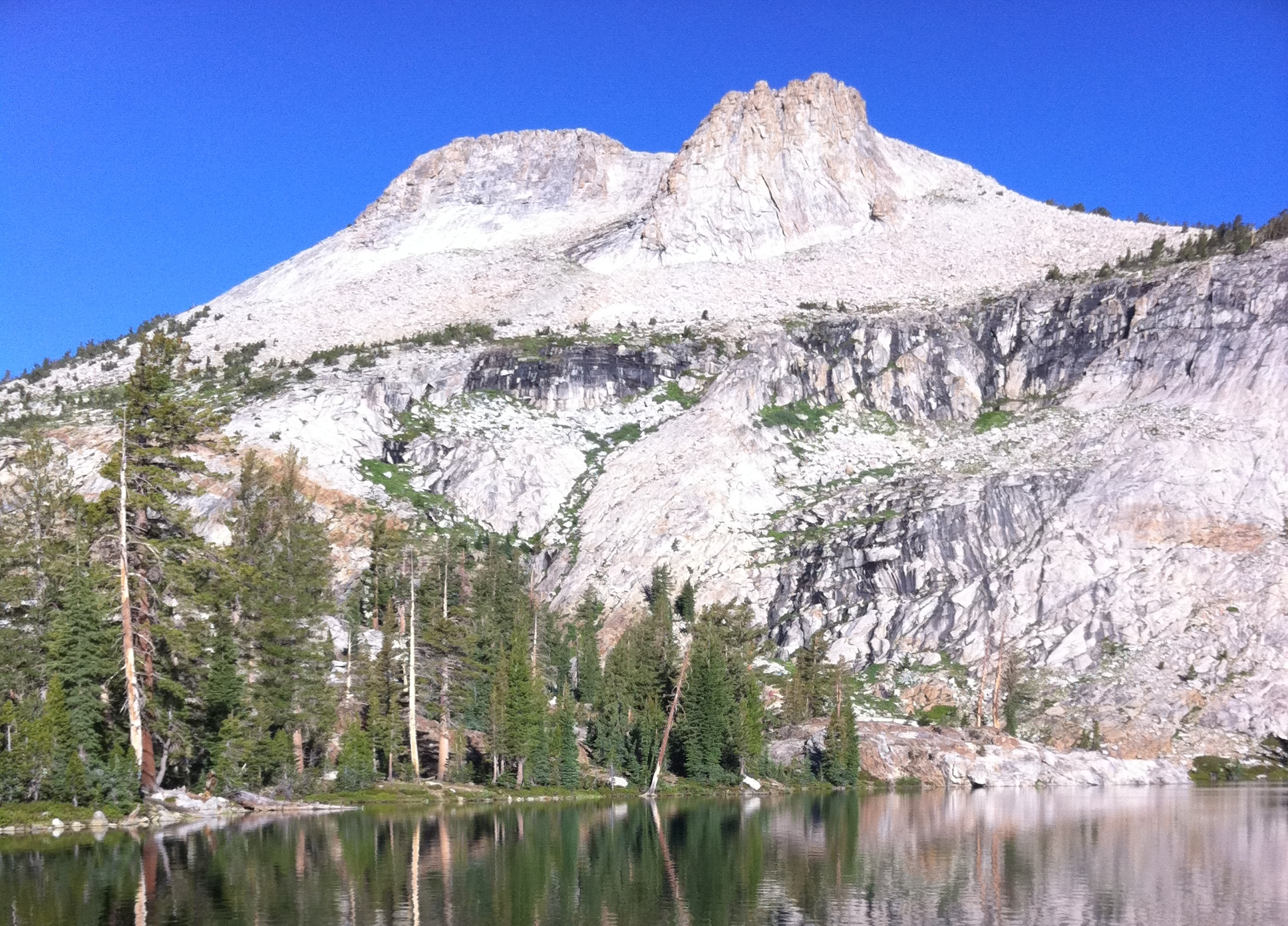
336. Mount Hoffmann in California's Yosemite National Park

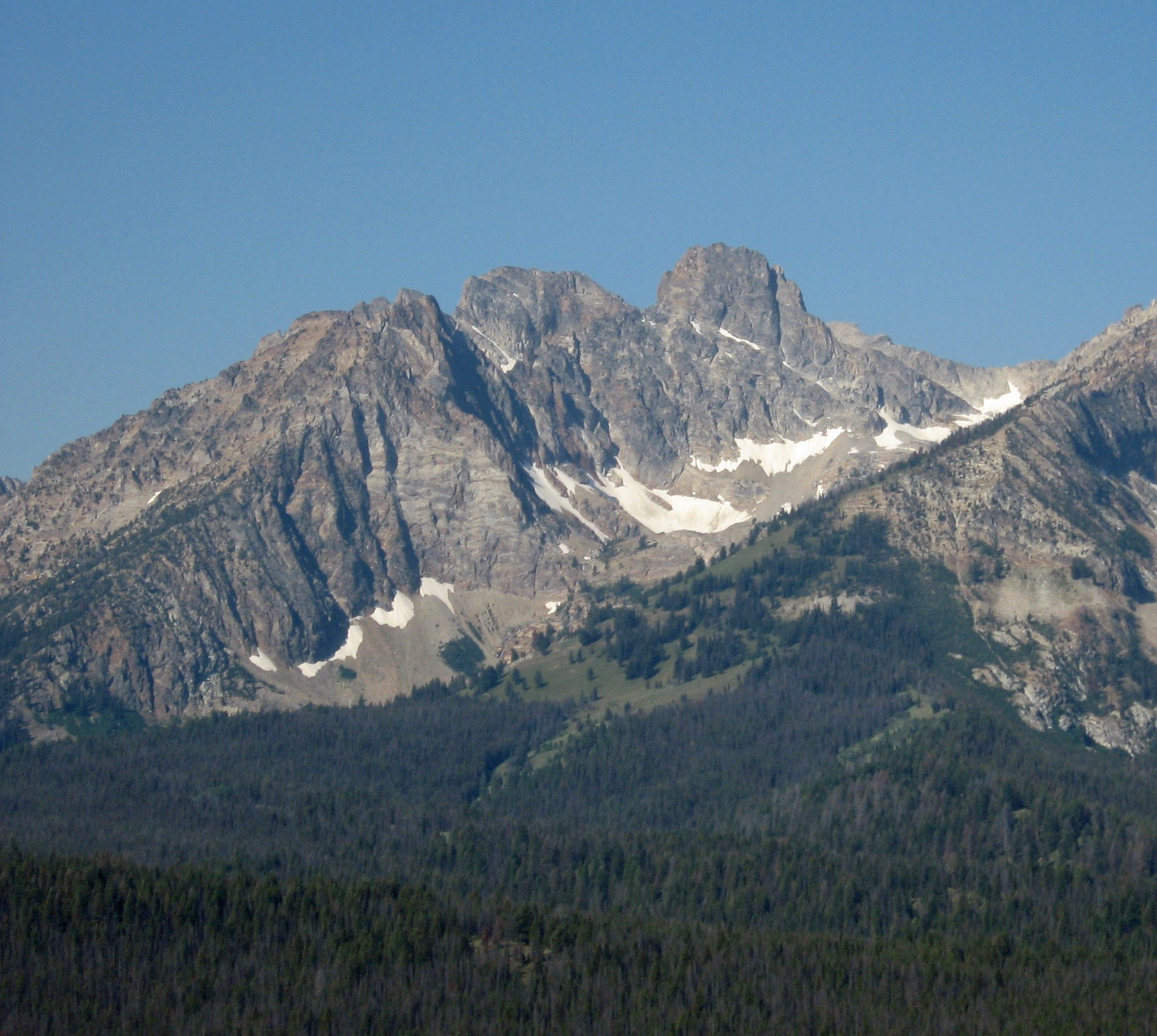
349. The summit of Thompson Peak is the highest point in Idaho's Sawtooth Range.

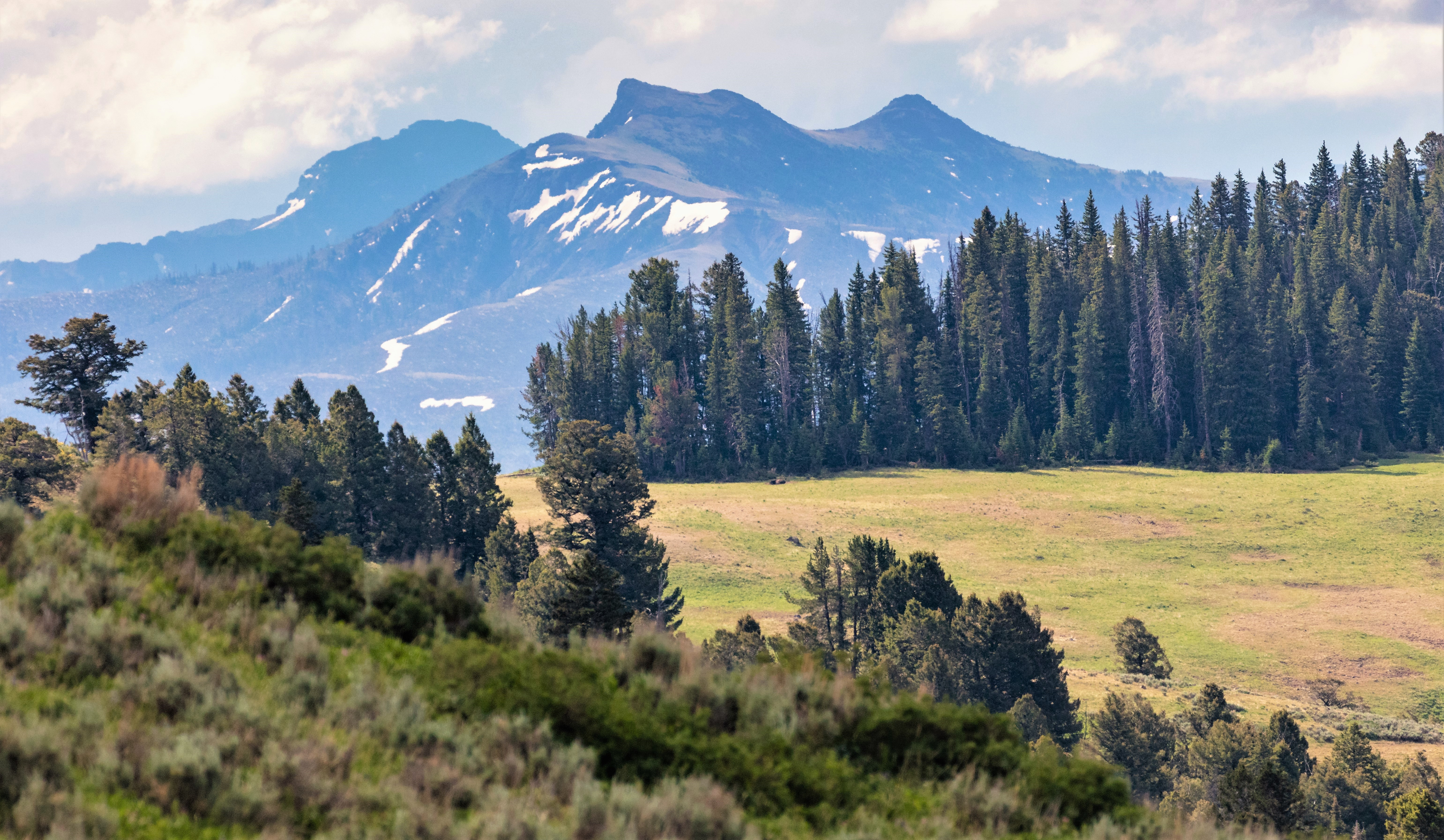
358. Saddle Mountain in Wyoming's Yellowstone National Park

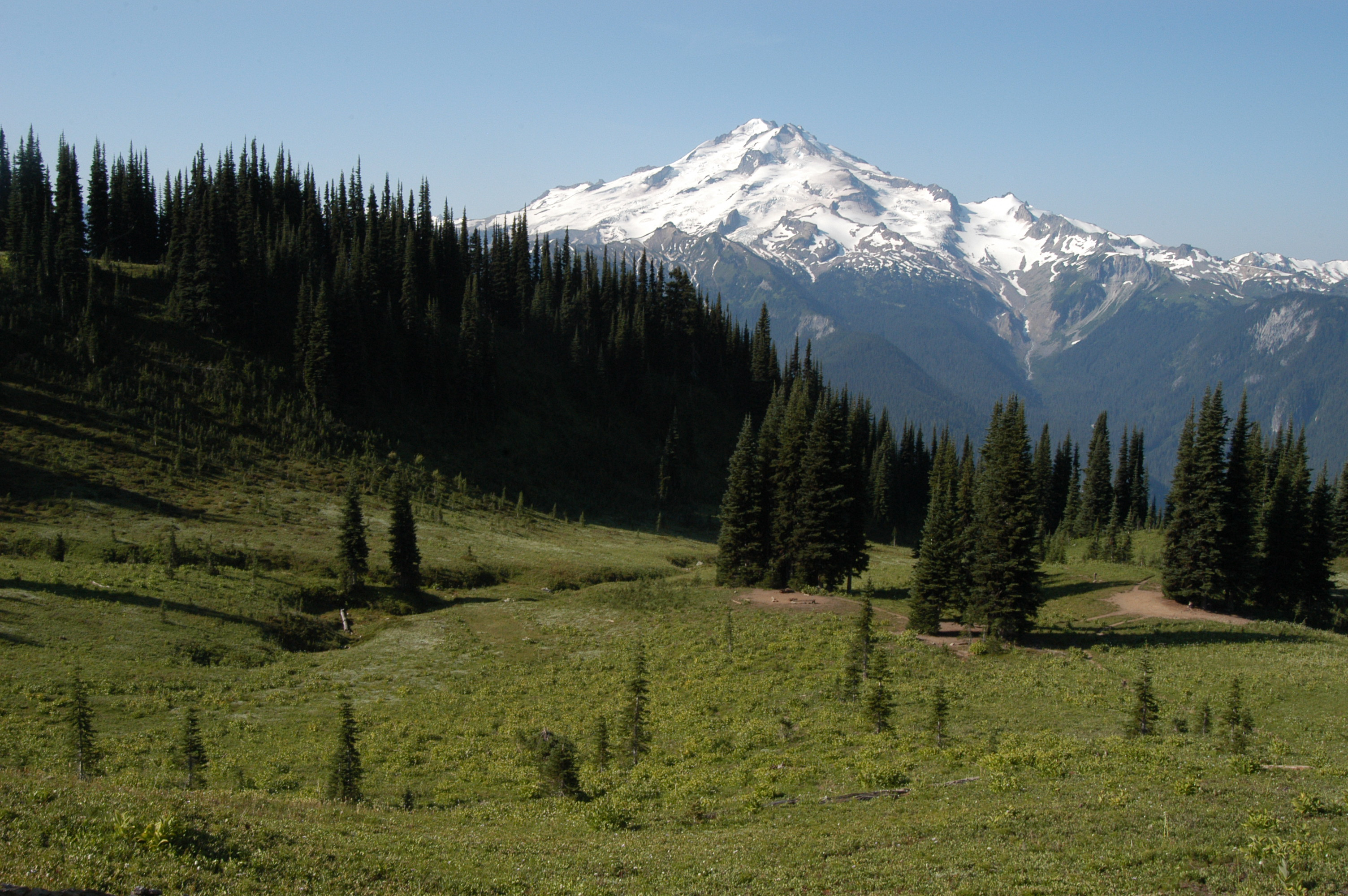
373. Glacier Peak is one of five major stratovolcanoes in the state of Washington.

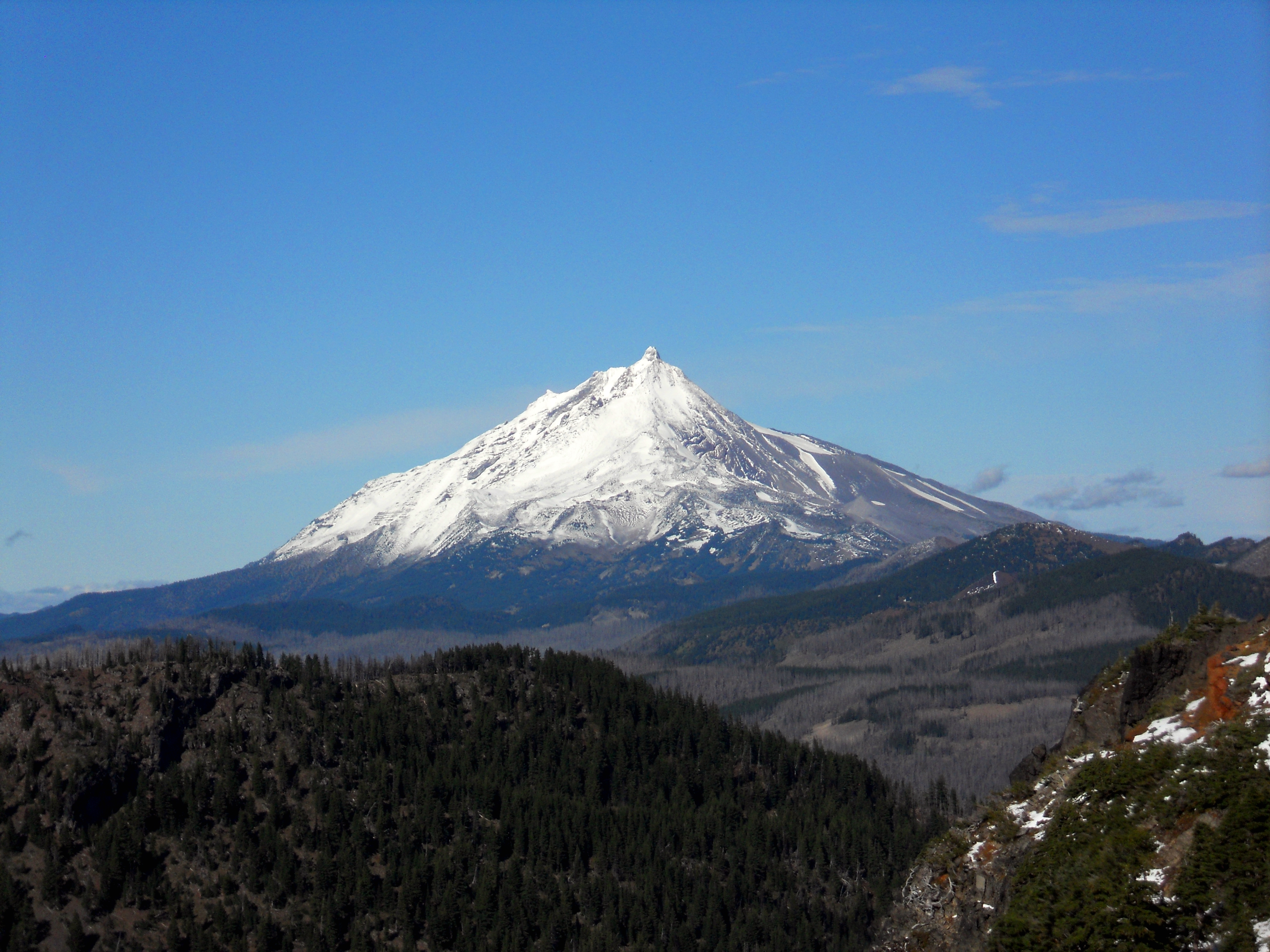
376. Mount Jefferson is the second-highest summit in Oregon.

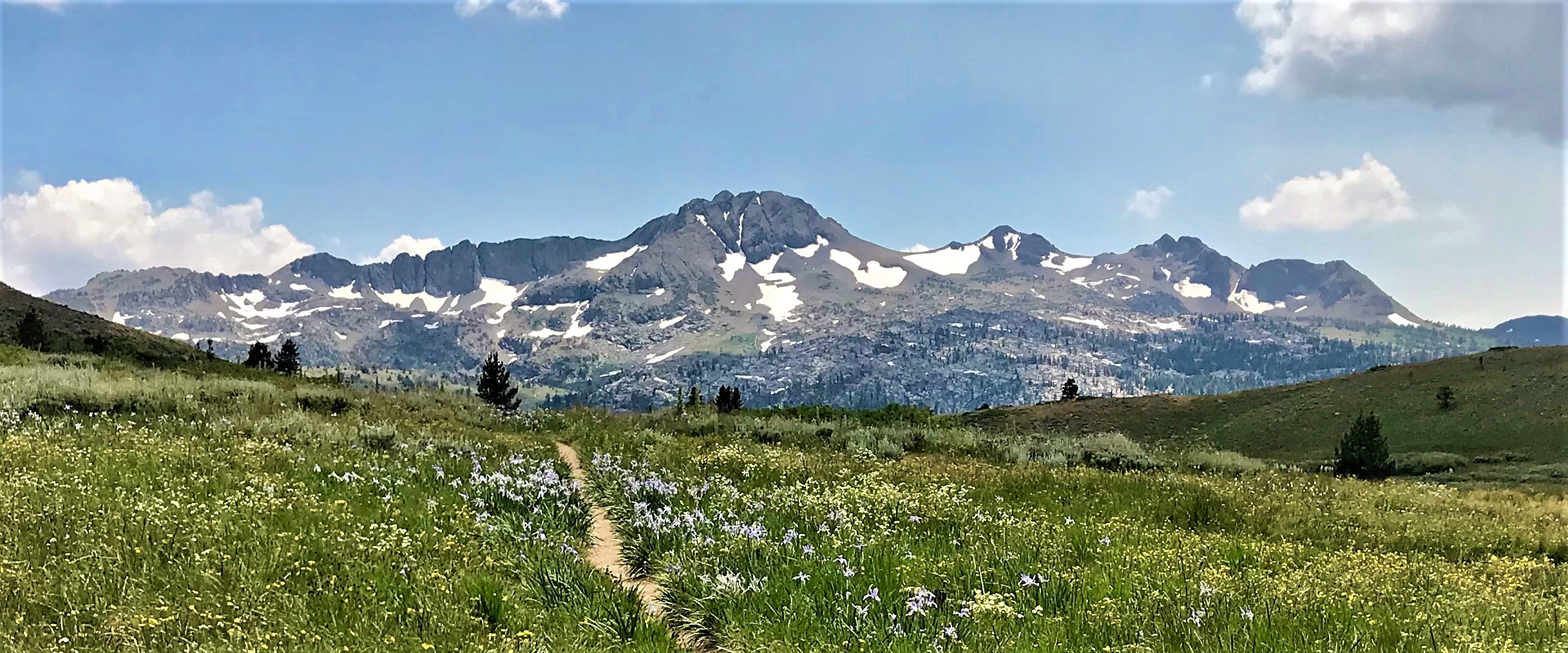
387. Round Top is the 16th most prominent summit in the state of California.

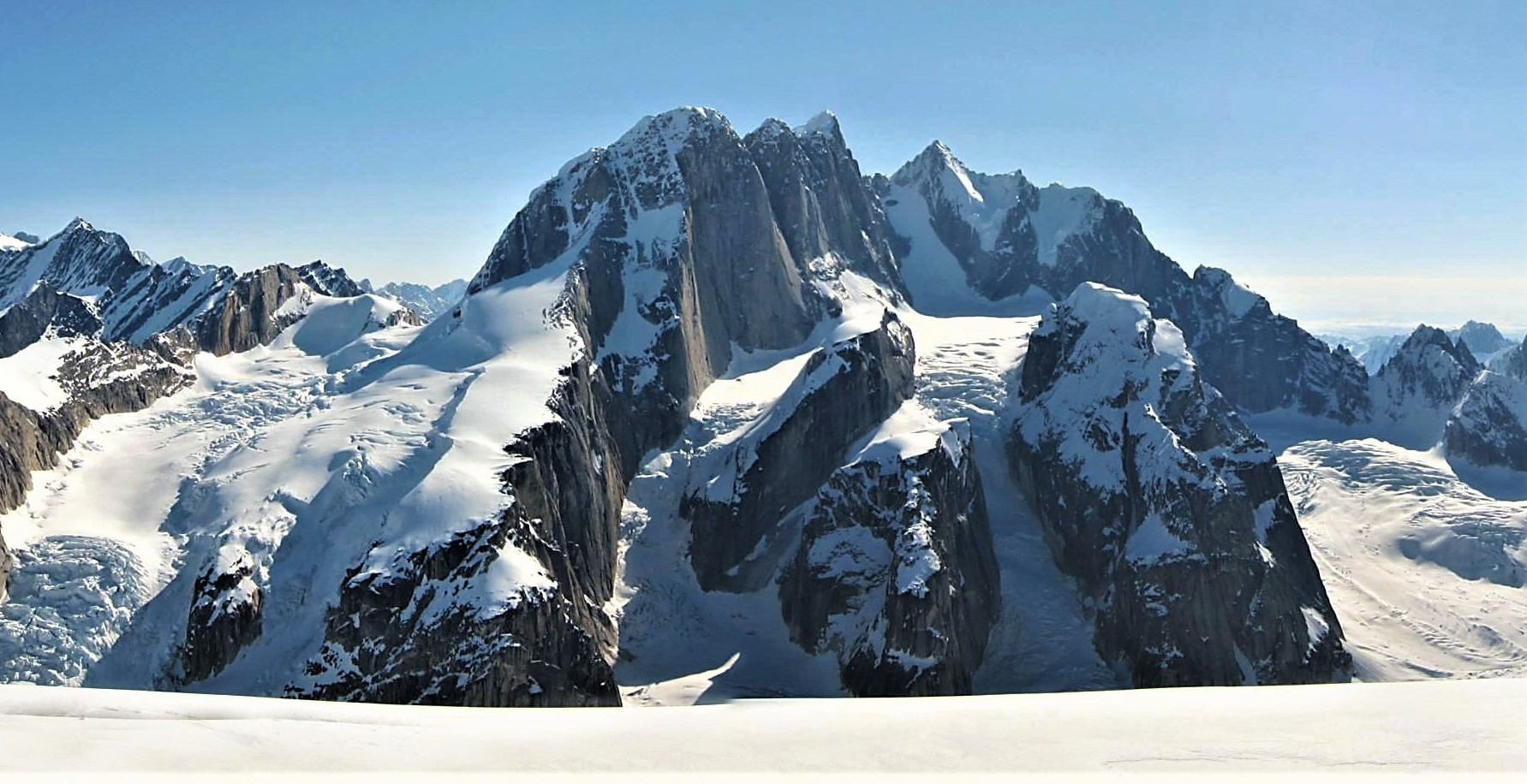
398. The Moose's Tooth in Alaska's Denali National Park

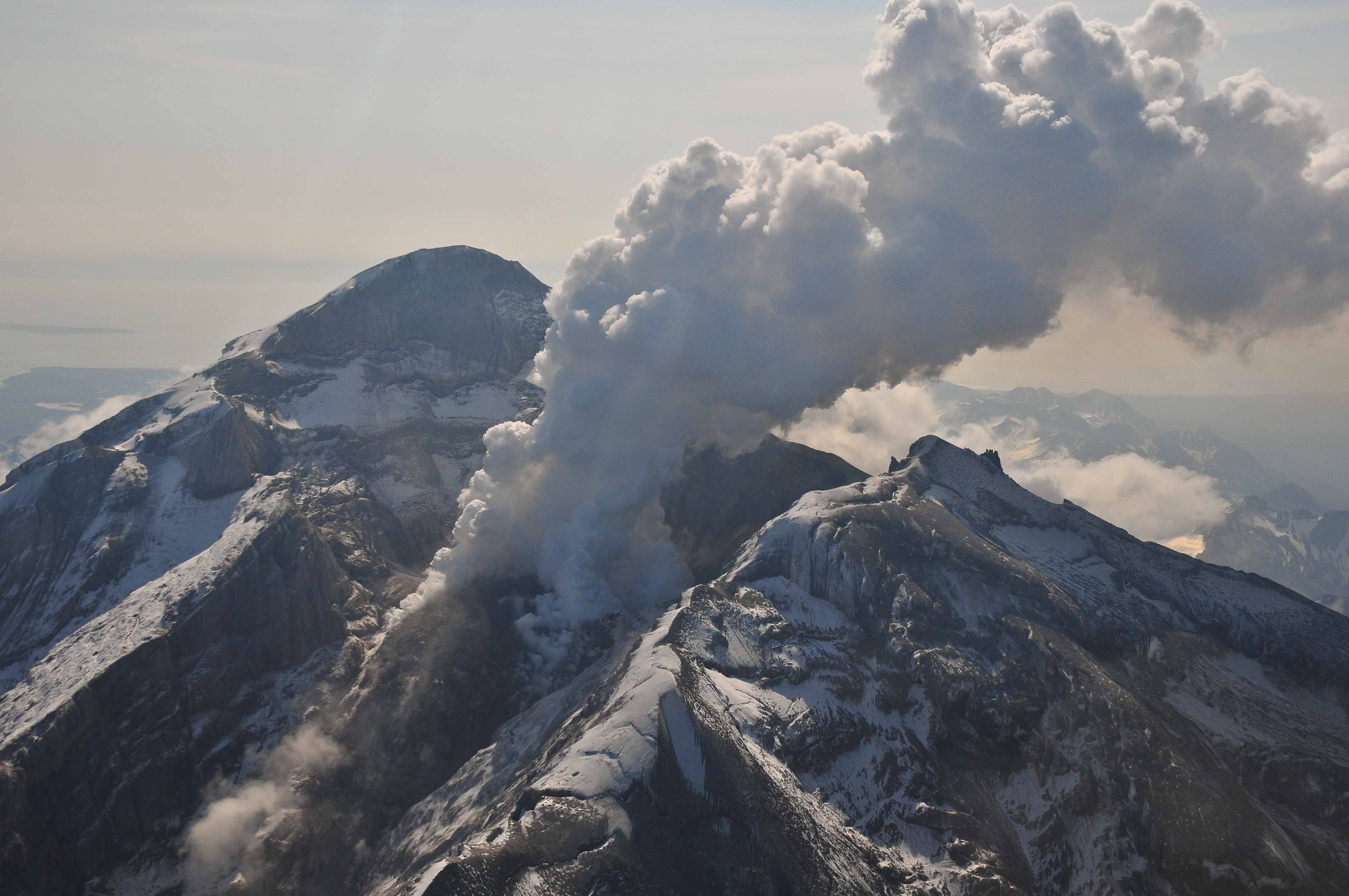
422. Redoubt Volcano is the highest summit of the Aleutian Range.

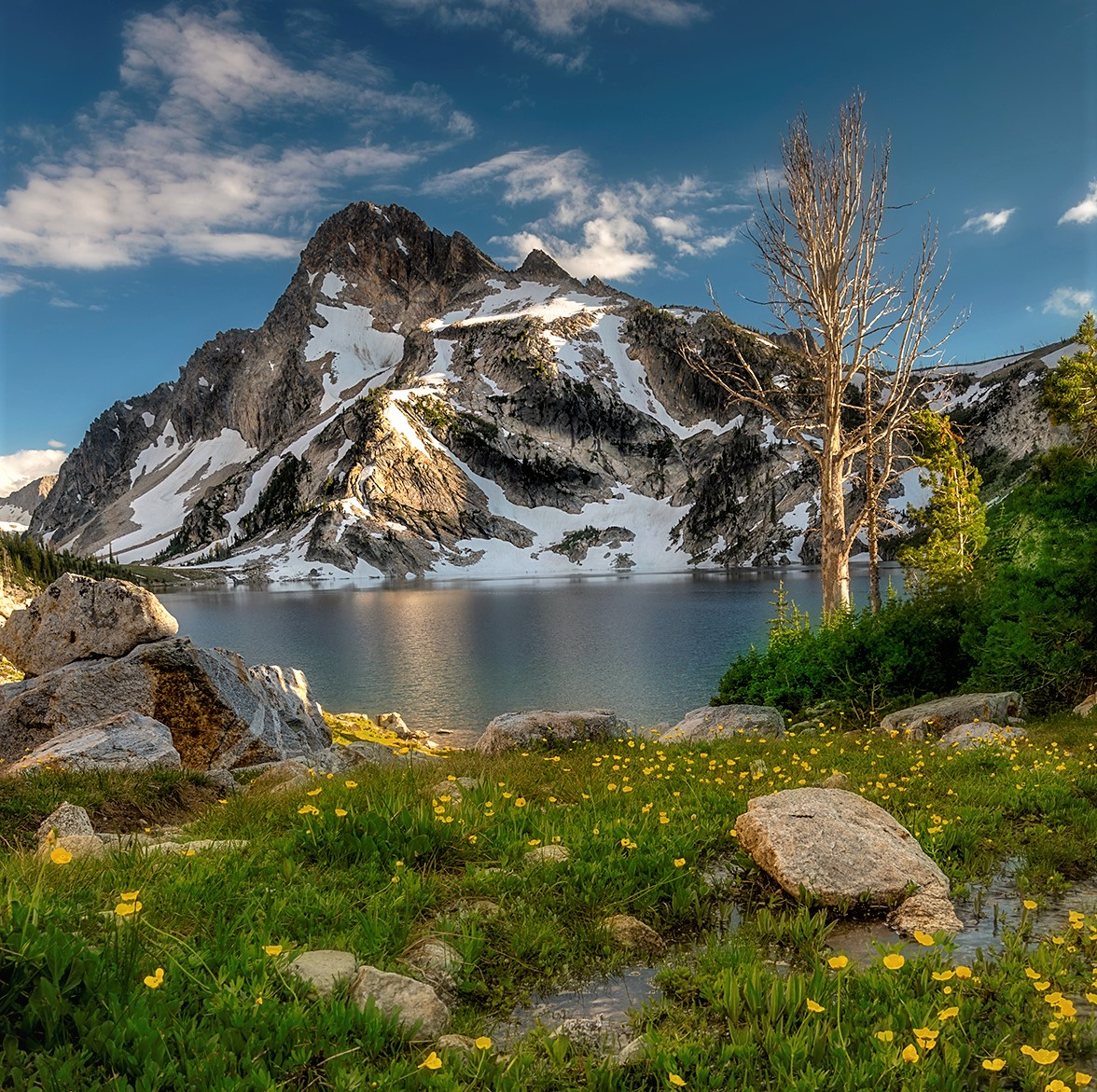
424. Mount Regan in Idaho's Sawtooth Range

430. The summit of Trapper Peak is the highest point in Montana's Bitterroot Mountains.

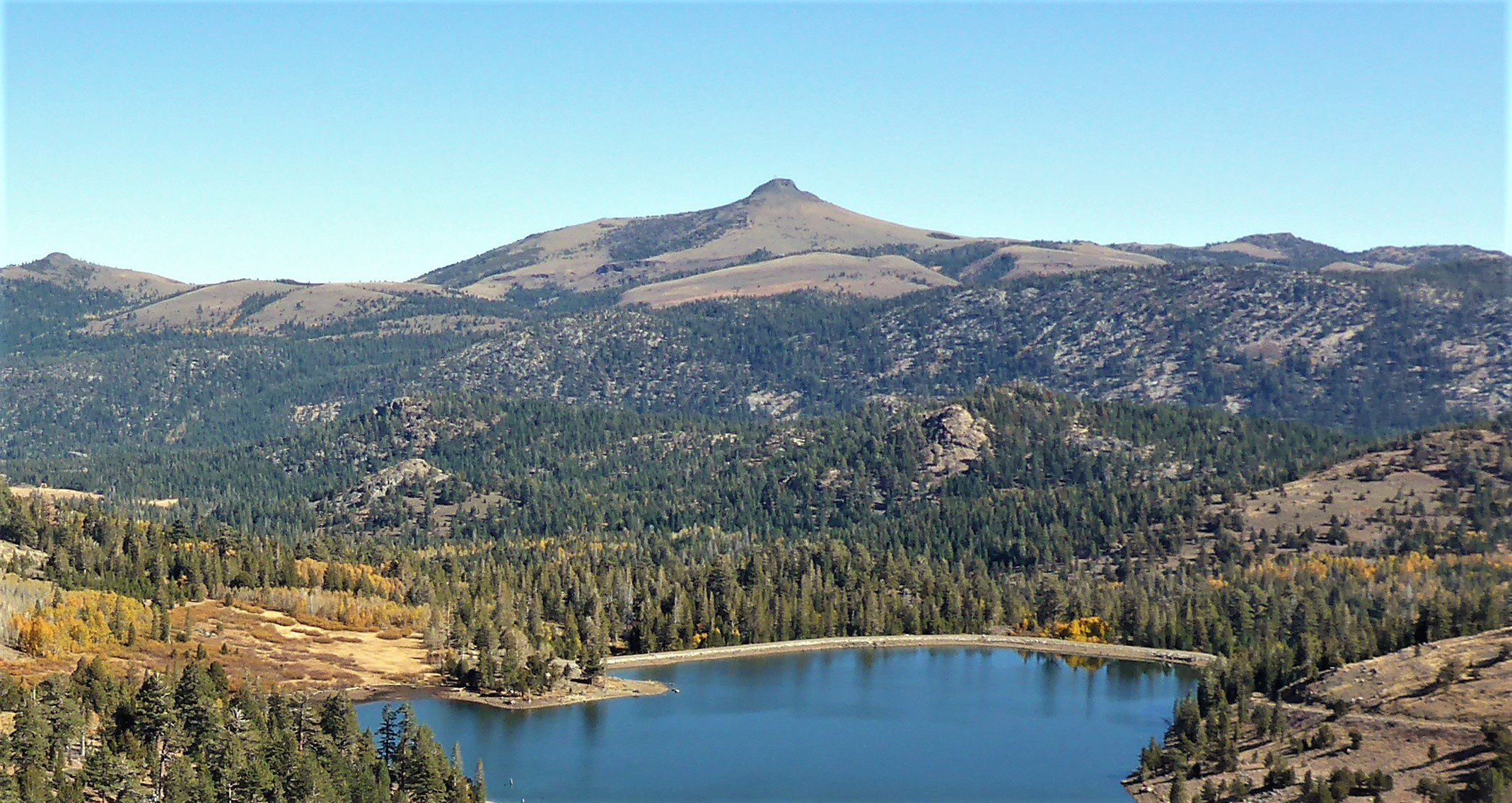
444. Hawkins Peak in Alpine County, California

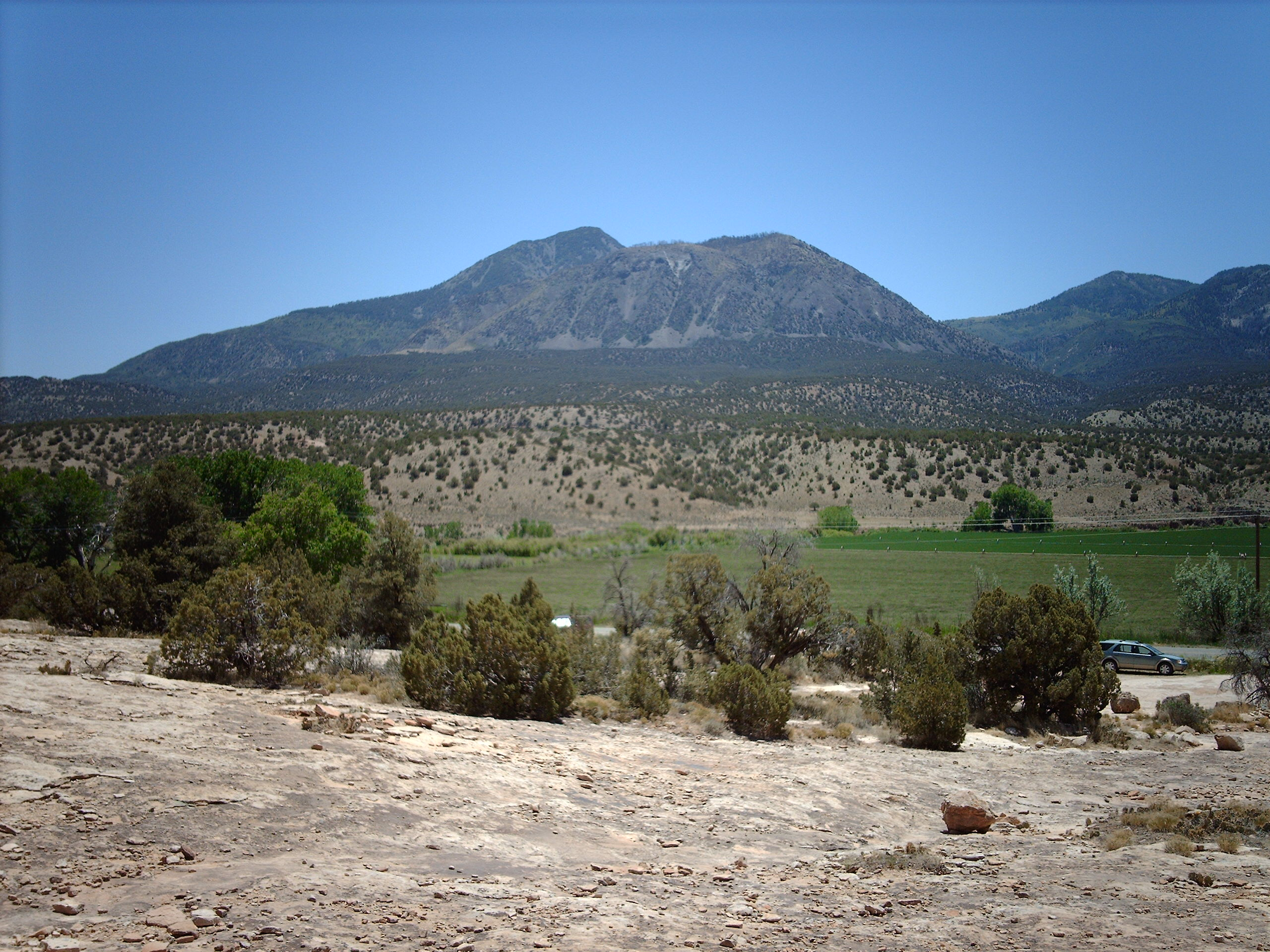
454. Ute Peak on the Ute Mountain Ute Tribe Reservation in southwest Colorado

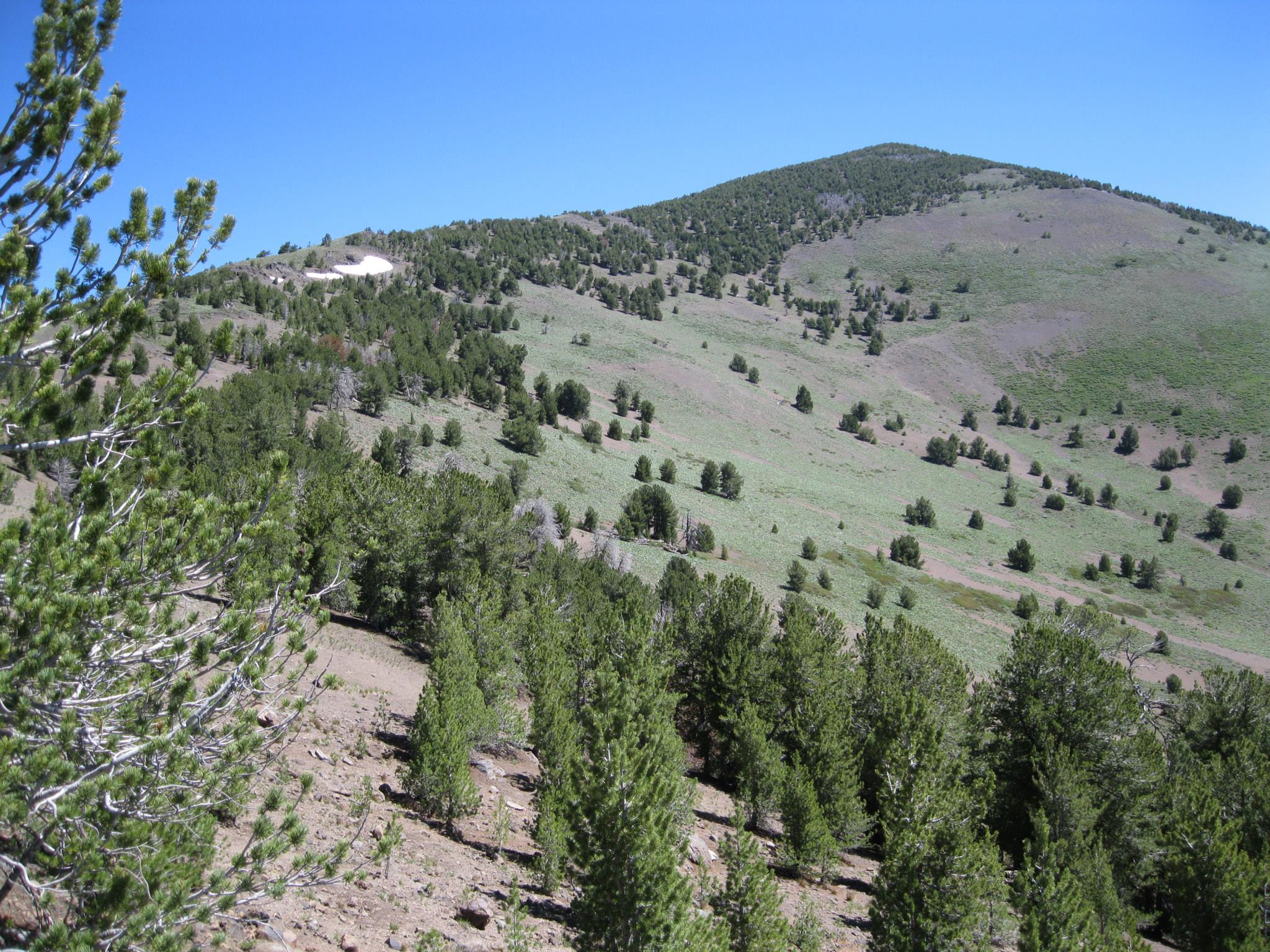
471. Eagle Peak is the highest summit of California's Warner Mountains and Modoc County.

== See also ==
- List of mountain peaks of North America
  - List of mountain peaks of Greenland
  - List of mountain peaks of Canada
  - List of mountain peaks of the Rocky Mountains
  - List of mountain peaks of the United States
    - List of the highest major summits of the United States
      - List of the major 4000-meter summits of the United States
      - List of the major 3000-meter summits of the United States
      - List of United States fourteeners
    - List of the most prominent summits of the United States
      - List of the ultra-prominent summits of the United States
    - List of the most isolated major summits of the United States
      - List of the major 100-kilometer summits of the United States
    - List of extreme summits of the United States
    - List of mountain peaks of Alaska
    - List of mountain peaks of California
    - List of mountain peaks of Colorado
    - List of mountain peaks of Hawaiʻi
    - List of mountain peaks of Montana
    - List of mountain peaks of Nevada
    - List of mountain peaks of Utah
    - List of mountain peaks of Washington (state)
    - List of mountain peaks of Wyoming
  - List of mountain peaks of México
  - List of mountain peaks of Central America
  - List of mountain peaks of the Caribbean
- United States of America
  - Geography of the United States
  - Geology of the United States
    - Category:Mountains of the United States
      - commons:Category:Mountains of the United States
- Physical geography
  - Topography
    - Topographic elevation
    - Topographic prominence
    - Topographic isolation
