= List of mountain peaks of Wyoming =

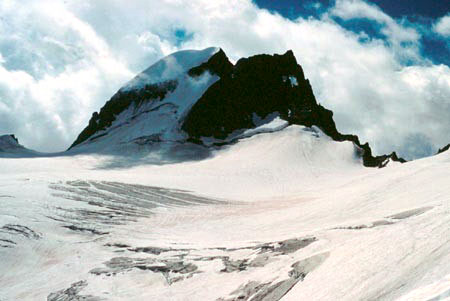
Gannett Peak is the highest summit of the Wind River Range, the U.S. State of Wyoming, and the Central Rocky Mountains.

This article comprises three sortable tables of major mountain peaks (Note: This article defines a significant summit as a summit with at least 100 meters (328.1 feet) of topographic prominence, and a major summit as a summit with at least 500 meters (1640 feet) of topographic prominence. All summits in this article have at least 500 meters of topographic prominence. An ultra-prominent summit is a summit with at least 1500 meters (4921 feet) of topographic prominence.) of the U.S. State of Wyoming.

The summit of a mountain or hill may be measured in three principal ways:

1. The topographic elevation of a summit measures the height of the summit above a geodetic sea level. (Note: All elevations in this article include an elevation adjustment from the National Geodetic Vertical Datum of 1929 (NGVD 29) to the North American Vertical Datum of 1988 (NAVD 88). For further information, please see this United States National Geodetic Survey note.) (Note: If the elevation or prominence of a summit is calculated as a range of values, the arithmetic mean is shown.) The first table below ranks the 40 highest major summits of Wyoming by elevation.
2. The topographic prominence of a summit is a measure of how high the summit rises above its surroundings. (Note: The topographic prominence of a summit is the topographic elevation difference between the summit and its highest or key col to a higher summit. The summit may be near its key col or quite far away. The key col for Denali in Alaska is the Isthmus of Rivas in Nicaragua, 7642 kilometers (4749 miles) away.) The second table below ranks the 40 most prominent summits of Wyoming.
3. The topographic isolation (or radius of dominance) of a summit measures how far the summit lies from its nearest point of equal elevation. (Note: The topographic isolation of a summit is the great-circle distance to its nearest point of equal elevation.) The third table below ranks the 40 most isolated major summits of Wyoming.

== Highest major summits ==
Of the highest major summits of Wyoming, five peaks exceed 4000 meters (13,123 feet) elevation, 16 peaks exceed 3500 meters (11,483 feet), and 38 peaks exceed 3000 meters (9843 feet) elevation.

The 40 highest summits of Wyoming with at least 500 meters of topographic prominence
Rank	Mountain peak	Mountain range	Elevation	Prominence	Isolation	Location
1	Gannett Peak (Note: The summit of Gannett Peak is the highest point of the Wind River Range, the U.S. State of Wyoming, and the central Rocky Mountains.) (Note: Gannett Peak is the northernmost and westernmost summit of its elevation in the Rocky Mountains.)	Wind River Range	13,810 ft 4209.3 m	7,076 ft 2157 m	290 mi 467 km	43.1842°N 109.6542°W
2	Grand Teton (Note: The summit of Grand Teton is the highest point of the Teton Range.) (Note: Grand Teton is the northernmost and westernmost 4000-meter (13,123-foot) summit of the Rocky Mountains.)	Teton Range	13,775 ft 4198.7 m	6,545 ft 1995 m	69.4 mi 111.6 km	43.7412°N 110.8024°W
3	Fremont Peak (Note: The summit of Fremont Peak is the highest point of the southern Wind River Range.)	Wind River Range	13,743 ft 4188.9 m	2,572 ft 784 m	35.1 mi 56.6 km	42.7085°N 109.1284°W
4	Cloud Peak (Note: The summit of Cloud Peak is the highest point of the Bighorn Mountains.) (Note: Cloud Peak is the northernmost 4000-meter (13,123-foot) summit of the Rocky Mountains.)	Bighorn Mountains	13,167 ft 4013.3 m	7,077 ft 2157 m	145 mi 233 km	44.3821°N 107.1739°W
5	Francs Peak (Note: The summit of Francs Peak is the highest point of the Absaroka Range.)	Absaroka Range	13,164 ft 4012.3 m	4,056 ft 1236 m	47.2 mi 76 km	43.9613°N 109.3392°W
6	Lizard Head Peak (Note: The summit of Lizard Head Peak is the highest point of the Cirque of the Towers.) (Note: The elevation of Lizard Head Peak includes an adjustment of +1.572 m (5.16 ft) from NGVD 29 to NAVD 88.)	Wind River Range	12,847 ft 3916 m	1,902 ft 580 m	6.46 mi 10.4 km	42.7901°N 109.1978°W
7	Mount Moran	Teton Range	12,610 ft 3843.5 m	2,645 ft 806 m	6.18 mi 9.94 km	43.8350°N 110.7765°W
8	Atlantic Peak (Note: The elevation of Atlantic Peak includes an adjustment of +1.521 m (4.99 ft) from NGVD 29 to NAVD 88.)	Wind River Range	12,495 ft 3808 m	2,150 ft 655 m	9.07 mi 14.6 km	42.6165°N 109.0013°W
9	Mount Nystrom	Wind River Range	12,361 ft 3767.5 m	1,816 ft 554 m	4.92 mi 7.92 km	42.6418°N 109.0939°W
10	Carter Mountain	Absaroka Range	12,324 ft 3756.4 m	1,699 ft 518 m	16.68 mi 26.8 km	44.1972°N 109.4112°W
11	Trout Peak (Note: The summit of Trout Peak is the highest point of the central Absaroka Range.)	Absaroka Range	12,250 ft 3733.7 m	3,704 ft 1129 m	28.4 mi 45.7 km	44.6012°N 109.5253°W
12	Younts Peak	Absaroka Range	12,166 ft 3708.3 m	2,241 ft 683 m	12.7 mi 20.4 km	43.9820°N 109.8665°W
13	Glover Peak (Note: The elevation of Glover Peak includes an adjustment of +1.609 m (5.28 ft) from NGVD 29 to NAVD 88.)	Wind River Range	12,072 ft 3680 m	1,706 ft 520 m	2.49 mi 4 km	43.1589°N 109.7656°W
14	Medicine Bow Peak (Note: The summit of Medicine Bow Peak is the highest point of the Snowy Range.)	Medicine Bow Mountains	12,016 ft 3662.4 m	3,243 ft 988 m	40.6 mi 65.4 km	41.3603°N 106.3176°W
15	Doubletop Peak (Note: The summit of Doubletop Peak is the highest point of the Gros Ventre Range.) (Note: The elevation of Doubletop Peak includes an adjustment of +1.708 m (5.6 ft) from NGVD 29 to NAVD 88.)	Gros Ventre Range	11,746 ft 3580 m	3,000 ft 914 m	24.8 mi 39.9 km	43.3473°N 110.2864°W
16	Pilot Peak	Absaroka Range	11,699 ft 3566 m	2,519 ft 768 m	10.76 mi 17.31 km	44.9762°N 109.8814°W
17	Wyoming Peak (Note: The summit of Wyoming Peak is the highest point of the Wyoming Range.)	Wyoming Range	11,423 ft 3481.6 m	3,558 ft 1084 m	50.8 mi 81.8 km	42.6043°N 110.6238°W
18	Eagle Peak (Note: The elevation of Eagle Peak includes an adjustment of +1.42 m (4.66 ft) from NGVD 29 to NAVD 88.)	Absaroka Range	11,372 ft 3466 m	1,867 ft 569 m	8.71 mi 14.02 km	44.3203°N 110.0267°W
19	North Breccia Cliffs (Note: The elevation of North Breccia Cliffs includes an adjustment of +1.529 m (5.02 ft) from NGVD 29 to NAVD 88.)	Absaroka Range	11,265 ft 3434 m	2,120 ft 646 m	6.92 mi 11.14 km	43.7963°N 110.0791°W
20	Elk Mountain	Medicine Bow Mountains	11,162 ft 3402.1 m	3,306 ft 1008 m	21.7 mi 35 km	41.6332°N 106.5262°W
21	Bridger Peak	Park Range	11,008 ft 3355.3 m	1,904 ft 580 m	25 mi 40.2 km	41.1864°N 107.0319°W
22	Rendezvous Peak (Note: The elevation of Rendezvous Peak includes an adjustment of +1.469 m (4.82 ft) from NGVD 29 to NAVD 88.)	Teton Range	10,932 ft 3332 m	1,842 ft 561 m	5.58 mi 8.98 km	43.5673°N 110.9049°W
23	Indian Peak	Absaroka Range	10,931 ft 3331.9 m	1,703 ft 519 m	5.62 mi 9.04 km	44.7775°N 109.8532°W
24	Mount Fitzpatrick (Note: The summit of Mount Fitzpatrick is the highest point of the Salt River Range.) (Note: The elevation of Mount Fitzpatrick includes an adjustment of +1.483 m (4.87 ft) from NGVD 29 to NAVD 88.)	Salt River Range	10,912 ft 3326 m	2,247 ft 685 m	10.68 mi 17.18 km	42.7241°N 110.7764°W
25	Hoback Peak	Wyoming Range	10,867 ft 3312.2 m	2,562 ft 781 m	20.1 mi 32.4 km	43.0845°N 110.5704°W
26	Mount McDougal (Note: The elevation of Mount McDougal includes an adjustment of +1.499 m (4.92 ft) from NGVD 29 to NAVD 88.)	Wyoming Range	10,785 ft 3287 m	2,360 ft 719 m	4.58 mi 7.37 km	42.8585°N 110.5920°W
27	Two Ocean Mountain	Yellowstone Plateau	10,724 ft 3268.7 m	2,086 ft 636 m	9.77 mi 15.72 km	44.0964°N 110.1516°W
28	Saddle Mountain	Absaroka Range	10,677 ft 3254.4 m	1,890 ft 576 m	3.98 mi 6.41 km	44.7105°N 109.9838°W
29	The Thunderer (Note: The elevation of The Thunderer includes an adjustment of +1.26 m (4.13 ft) from NGVD 29 to NAVD 88.)	Absaroka Range	10,558 ft 3218 m	1,734 ft 529 m	5.11 mi 8.22 km	44.9032°N 110.0561°W
30	Barronette Peak (Note: The elevation of Barronette Peak includes an adjustment of +1.274 m (4.18 ft) from NGVD 29 to NAVD 88.)	Absaroka Range	10,446 ft 3184 m	2,142 ft 653 m	2.74 mi 4.41 km	44.9755°N 110.0881°W
31	Deadman Mountain	Wyoming Range	10,366 ft 3159.6 m	1,749 ft 533 m	10.79 mi 17.36 km	43.0051°N 110.6655°W
32	Mount Sheridan (Note: The summit of Mount Sheridan is the highest point of the Red Mountains.)	Red Mountains	10,313 ft 3143.4 m	2,318 ft 707 m	20.6 mi 33.2 km	44.2662°N 110.5293°W
33	Laramie Peak	Laramie Mountains	10,276 ft 3132 m	3,317 ft 1011 m	67.4 mi 108.4 km	42.2681°N 105.4425°W
34	Windy Mountain	Absaroka Range	10,267 ft 3129.3 m	2,042 ft 622 m	11.3 mi 18.19 km	44.7914°N 109.5928°W
35	Mount Washburn	Gallatin Range	10,249 ft 3123.8 m	2,333 ft 711 m	19.94 mi 32.1 km	44.7977°N 110.4339°W
36	Mount Hancock	Yellowstone Plateau	10,220 ft 3115.2 m	1,794 ft 547 m	9.46 mi 15.22 km	44.1553°N 110.4174°W
37	Ferris Mountain (Note: The summit of Ferris Mountain is the highest point of the Ferris Mountains.)	Ferris Mountains	10,071 ft 3069.6 m	3,282 ft 1000 m	55.3 mi 89 km	42.2566°N 107.2394°W
38	Observation Peak	Snake River Range	9,974 ft 3040 m	2,480 ft 756 m	9.11 mi 14.66 km	43.2840°N 110.9498°W
39	Warbonnet Peak	Laramie Mountains	9,418 ft 2870.6 m	1,744 ft 532 m	21.4 mi 34.4 km	42.4348°N 105.7939°W
40	Shirley Mountains high point	Shirley Mountains	9,158 ft 2791.5 m	1,956 ft 596 m	33.4 mi 53.7 km	42.1666°N 106.5565°W

== Most prominent summits ==
Of the most prominent summits of Wyoming, Cloud Peak and Gannett Peak both exceed 2000 meters (6562 feet) of topographic prominence. Those two peaks and Grand Teton are ultra-prominent summits with more than 1500 meters (4921 feet) of topographic prominence. Nine peaks exceed 1000 meters (3281 feet) of topographic prominence.

The 40 most topographically prominent summits of Wyoming
Rank	Mountain peak	Mountain range	Elevation	Prominence	Isolation	Location
1	Cloud Peak	Bighorn Mountains	13,167 ft 4013.3 m	7,077 ft 2157 m	145 mi 233 km	44.3821°N 107.1739°W
2	Gannett Peak	Wind River Range	13,809 ft 4209.1 m	7,076 ft 2157 m	290 mi 467 km	43.1842°N 109.6542°W
3	Grand Teton	Teton Range	13,775 ft 4198.7 m	6,545 ft 1995 m	69.4 mi 111.6 km	43.7412°N 110.8024°W
4	Francs Peak	Absaroka Range	13,164 ft 4012.3 m	4,056 ft 1236 m	47.2 mi 76 km	43.9613°N 109.3392°W
5	Trout Peak	Absaroka Range	12,250 ft 3733.7 m	3,704 ft 1129 m	28.4 mi 45.7 km	44.6012°N 109.5253°W
6	Wyoming Peak	Wyoming Range	11,423 ft 3481.6 m	3,558 ft 1084 m	50.8 mi 81.8 km	42.6043°N 110.6238°W
7	Laramie Peak	Laramie Mountains	10,276 ft 3132 m	3,317 ft 1011 m	67.4 mi 108.4 km	42.2681°N 105.4425°W
8	Elk Mountain	Medicine Bow Mountains	11,162 ft 3402.1 m	3,306 ft 1008 m	21.7 mi 35 km	41.6332°N 106.5262°W
9	Ferris Mountain	Ferris Mountains	10,071 ft 3069.6 m	3,282 ft 1000 m	55.3 mi 89 km	42.2566°N 107.2394°W
10	Medicine Bow Peak	Medicine Bow Mountains	12,016 ft 3662.4 m	3,243 ft 988 m	40.6 mi 65.4 km	41.3603°N 106.3176°W
11	Doubletop Peak	Gros Ventre Range	11,746 ft 3580 m	3,000 ft 914 m	24.8 mi 39.9 km	43.3473°N 110.2864°W
12	Mount Moran	Teton Range	12,610 ft 3843.5 m	2,645 ft 806 m	6.18 mi 9.94 km	43.8350°N 110.7765°W
13	Wind River Peak (Note: The summit of Wind River Peak is the highest point of the southern Wind River Range.)	Wind River Range	13,197 ft 4022.4 m	2,572 ft 784 m	35.1 mi 56.6 km	42.7085°N 109.1284°W
14	Hoback Peak	Wyoming Range	10,867 ft 3312.2 m	2,562 ft 781 m	20.1 mi 32.4 km	43.0845°N 110.5704°W
15	Pilot Peak	Absaroka Range	11,699 ft 3566 m	2,519 ft 768 m	10.76 mi 17.31 km	44.9762°N 109.8814°W
16	Observation Peak	Snake River Range	9,974 ft 3040 m	2,480 ft 756 m	9.11 mi 14.66 km	43.2840°N 110.9498°W
17	Mount McDougal	Wyoming Range	10,785 ft 3287 m	2,360 ft 719 m	4.58 mi 7.37 km	42.8585°N 110.5920°W
18	Mount Washburn	Gallatin Range	10,249 ft 3123.8 m	2,333 ft 711 m	19.94 mi 32.1 km	44.7977°N 110.4339°W
19	Mount Sheridan	Red Mountains	10,313 ft 3143.4 m	2,318 ft 707 m	20.6 mi 33.2 km	44.2662°N 110.5293°W
20	Mount Fitzpatrick	Salt River Range	10,912 ft 3326 m	2,247 ft 685 m	10.68 mi 17.18 km	42.7241°N 110.7764°W
21	Younts Peak	Absaroka Range	12,166 ft 3708.3 m	2,241 ft 683 m	12.7 mi 20.4 km	43.9820°N 109.8665°W
22	Atlantic Peak	Wind River Range	12,495 ft 3808 m	2,150 ft 655 m	9.07 mi 14.6 km	42.6165°N 109.0013°W
23	Barronette Peak	Absaroka Range	10,446 ft 3184 m	2,142 ft 653 m	2.74 mi 4.41 km	44.9755°N 110.0881°W
24	North Breccia Cliffs	Absaroka Range	11,265 ft 3434 m	2,120 ft 646 m	6.92 mi 11.14 km	43.7963°N 110.0791°W
25	Two Ocean Mountain	Yellowstone Plateau	10,221 ft 3115.5 m	2,086 ft 636 m	9.77 mi 15.72 km	44.0964°N 110.1516°W
26	Windy Mountain	Absaroka Range	10,267 ft 3129.3 m	2,042 ft 622 m	11.3 mi 18.19 km	44.7914°N 109.5928°W
27	Shirley Mountains high point	Shirley Mountains	9,158 ft 2791.5 m	1,956 ft 596 m	33.4 mi 53.7 km	42.1666°N 106.5565°W
28	Bridger Peak	Park Range	11,008 ft 3355.3 m	1,904 ft 580 m	25 mi 40.2 km	41.1864°N 107.0319°W
29	Lizard Head Peak (Note: The summit of Lizard Head Peak is the highest point of the Cirque of the Towers.) (Note: The elevation of Lizard Head Peak includes an adjustment of +1.572 m (5.16 ft) from NGVD 29 to NAVD 88.)	Wind River Range	12,847 ft 3916 m	1,902 ft 580 m	6.46 mi 10.4 km	42.7901°N 109.1978°W
30	Saddle Mountain	Absaroka Range	10,677 ft 3254.4 m	1,890 ft 576 m	3.98 mi 6.41 km	44.7105°N 109.9838°W
31	Eagle Peak	Absaroka Range	11,372 ft 3466 m	1,867 ft 569 m	8.71 mi 14.02 km	44.3203°N 110.0267°W
32	Rendezvous Peak	Teton Range	10,932 ft 3332 m	1,842 ft 561 m	5.58 mi 8.98 km	43.5673°N 110.9049°W
33	Mount Nystrom	Wind River Range	12,361 ft 3767.5 m	1,816 ft 554 m	4.92 mi 7.92 km	42.6418°N 109.0939°W
34	Mount Hancock	Yellowstone Plateau	10,219 ft 3114.6 m	1,794 ft 547 m	9.46 mi 15.22 km	44.1553°N 110.4174°W
35	Deadman Mountain	Wyoming Range	10,366 ft 3159.6 m	1,749 ft 533 m	10.79 mi 17.36 km	43.0051°N 110.6655°W
36	Warbonnet Peak	Laramie Mountains	9,418 ft 2870.6 m	1,744 ft 532 m	21.4 mi 34.4 km	42.4348°N 105.7939°W
37	Mine Benchmark	Bighorn Mountains	9,124 ft 2781 m	1,741 ft 531 m	44.5 mi 71.6 km	43.4434°N 107.2559°W
38	The Thunderer	Absaroka Range	10,558 ft 3218 m	1,734 ft 529 m	5.11 mi 8.22 km	44.9032°N 110.0561°W
39	Glover Peak	Wind River Range	12,072 ft 3680 m	1,706 ft 520 m	2.49 mi 4 km	43.1589°N 109.7656°W
40	Indian Peak	Absaroka Range	10,931 ft 3331.9 m	1,703 ft 519 m	5.62 mi 9.04 km	44.7775°N 109.8532°W

== Most isolated major summits ==
Of the most isolated major summits of Wyoming, four peaks exceed 100 kilometers (62.14 miles) of topographic isolation and 32 peaks exceed 10 kilometers (6.21 miles) of topographic isolation.

The 40 most topographically isolated summits of Wyoming with at least 500 meters of topographic prominence
Rank	Mountain peak	Mountain range	Elevation	Prominence	Isolation	Location
1	Gannett Peak	Wind River Range	13,809 ft 4209.1 m	7,076 ft 2157 m	290 mi 467 km	43.1842°N 109.6542°W
2	Cloud Peak	Bighorn Mountains	13,167 ft 4013.3 m	7,077 ft 2157 m	145 mi 233 km	44.3821°N 107.1739°W
3	Grand Teton	Teton Range	13,775 ft 4198.7 m	6,545 ft 1995 m	69.4 mi 111.6 km	43.7412°N 110.8024°W
4	Laramie Peak	Laramie Mountains	10,276 ft 3132 m	3,317 ft 1011 m	67.4 mi 108.4 km	42.2681°N 105.4425°W
5	Ferris Mountain	Ferris Mountains	10,071 ft 3069.6 m	3,282 ft 1000 m	55.3 mi 89 km	42.2566°N 107.2394°W
6	Wyoming Peak	Wyoming Range	11,423 ft 3481.6 m	3,558 ft 1084 m	50.8 mi 81.8 km	42.6043°N 110.6238°W
7	Francs Peak	Absaroka Range	13,164 ft 4012.3 m	4,056 ft 1236 m	47.2 mi 76 km	43.9613°N 109.3392°W
8	Mine Benchmark	Bighorn Mountains	9,124 ft 2781 m	1,741 ft 531 m	44.5 mi 71.6 km	43.4434°N 107.2559°W
9	Medicine Bow Peak	Medicine Bow Mountains	12,016 ft 3662.4 m	3,243 ft 988 m	40.6 mi 65.4 km	41.3603°N 106.3176°W
10	Wind River Peak	Wind River Range	13,197 ft 4022.4 m	2,572 ft 784 m	35.1 mi 56.6 km	42.7085°N 109.1284°W
11	Shirley Mountains high point	Shirley Mountains	9,158 ft 2791.5 m	1,956 ft 596 m	33.4 mi 53.7 km	42.1666°N 106.5565°W
12	Trout Peak	Absaroka Range	12,250 ft 3733.7 m	3,704 ft 1129 m	28.4 mi 45.7 km	44.6012°N 109.5253°W
13	Bridger Peak	Park Range	11,008 ft 3355.3 m	1,904 ft 580 m	25 mi 40.2 km	41.1864°N 107.0319°W
14	Doubletop Peak	Gros Ventre Range	11,746 ft 3580 m	3,000 ft 914 m	24.8 mi 39.9 km	43.3473°N 110.2864°W
15	Elk Mountain	Medicine Bow Mountains	11,162 ft 3402.1 m	3,306 ft 1008 m	21.7 mi 35 km	41.6332°N 106.5262°W
16	Warbonnet Peak	Laramie Mountains	9,418 ft 2870.6 m	1,744 ft 532 m	21.4 mi 34.4 km	42.4348°N 105.7939°W
17	Mount Sheridan	Red Mountains	10,313 ft 3143.4 m	2,318 ft 707 m	20.6 mi 33.2 km	44.2662°N 110.5293°W
18	Hoback Peak	Wyoming Range	10,867 ft 3312.2 m	2,562 ft 781 m	20.1 mi 32.4 km	43.0845°N 110.5704°W
19	Mount Washburn	Gallatin Range	10,249 ft 3123.8 m	2,333 ft 711 m	19.94 mi 32.1 km	44.7977°N 110.4339°W
20	Carter Mountain	Absaroka Range	12,324 ft 3756.4 m	1,699 ft 518 m	16.68 mi 26.8 km	44.1972°N 109.4112°W
21	Younts Peak	Absaroka Range	12,166 ft 3708.3 m	2,241 ft 683 m	12.7 mi 20.4 km	43.9820°N 109.8665°W
22	Windy Mountain	Absaroka Range	10,267 ft 3129.3 m	2,042 ft 622 m	11.3 mi 18.19 km	44.7914°N 109.5928°W
23	Deadman Mountain	Wyoming Range	10,366 ft 3159.6 m	1,749 ft 533 m	10.79 mi 17.36 km	43.0051°N 110.6655°W
24	Pilot Peak	Absaroka Range	11,699 ft 3566 m	2,519 ft 768 m	10.76 mi 17.31 km	44.9762°N 109.8814°W
25	Mount Fitzpatrick	Salt River Range	10,912 ft 3326 m	2,247 ft 685 m	10.68 mi 17.18 km	42.7241°N 110.7764°W
26	Two Ocean Mountain	Yellowstone Plateau	10,221 ft 3115.5 m	2,086 ft 636 m	9.77 mi 15.72 km	44.0964°N 110.1516°W
27	Mount Hancock	Yellowstone Plateau	10,219 ft 3114.6 m	1,794 ft 547 m	9.46 mi 15.22 km	44.1553°N 110.4174°W
28	Observation Peak	Snake River Range	9,974 ft 3040 m	2,480 ft 756 m	9.11 mi 14.66 km	43.2840°N 110.9498°W
29	Atlantic Peak	Wind River Range	12,495 ft 3808 m	2,150 ft 655 m	9.07 mi 14.6 km	42.6165°N 109.0013°W
30	Eagle Peak	Absaroka Range	11,372 ft 3466 m	1,867 ft 569 m	8.71 mi 14.02 km	44.3203°N 110.0267°W
	North Breccia Cliffs	Absaroka Range	11,265 ft 3434 m	2,120 ft 646 m	6.92 mi 11.14 km	43.7963°N 110.0791°W
	Lizard Head Peak	Wind River Range	12,847 ft 3916 m	1,902 ft 580 m	6.46 mi 10.4 km	42.7901°N 109.1978°W
	Mount Moran	Teton Range	12,610 ft 3843.5 m	2,645 ft 806 m	6.18 mi 9.94 km	43.8350°N 110.7765°W
34	Indian Peak	Absaroka Range	10,931 ft 3331.9 m	1,703 ft 519 m	5.62 mi 9.04 km	44.7775°N 109.8532°W
35	Rendezvous Peak	Teton Range	10,932 ft 3332 m	1,842 ft 561 m	5.58 mi 8.98 km	43.5673°N 110.9049°W
36	The Thunderer	Absaroka Range	10,558 ft 3218 m	1,734 ft 529 m	5.11 mi 8.22 km	44.9032°N 110.0561°W
37	Mount Nystrom	Wind River Range	12,361 ft 3767.5 m	1,816 ft 554 m	4.92 mi 7.92 km	42.6418°N 109.0939°W
38	Mount McDougal	Wyoming Range	10,785 ft 3287 m	2,360 ft 719 m	4.58 mi 7.37 km	42.8585°N 110.5920°W
39	Saddle Mountain	Absaroka Range	10,677 ft 3254.4 m	1,890 ft 576 m	3.98 mi 6.41 km	44.7105°N 109.9838°W
40	Barronette Peak	Absaroka Range	10,446 ft 3184 m	2,142 ft 653 m	2.74 mi 4.41 km	44.9755°N 110.0881°W

== Hazards ==
Encountering bears is a concern in the Wind River Range. There are other concerns as well, including bugs, wildfires, adverse snow conditions and nighttime cold temperatures.

Importantly, there have been notable incidents, including accidental deaths, due to falls from steep cliffs (a misstep could be fatal in this class 4/5 terrain) and due to falling rocks, over the years, including 1993, 2007 (involving an experienced NOLS leader), 2015 and 2018. Other incidents include a seriously injured backpacker being airlifted near SquareTop Mountain in 2005, and a fatal hiker incident (from an apparent accidental fall) in 2006 that involved state search and rescue. The U.S. Forest Service does not offer updated aggregated records on the official number of fatalities in the Wind River Range.

== Gallery ==
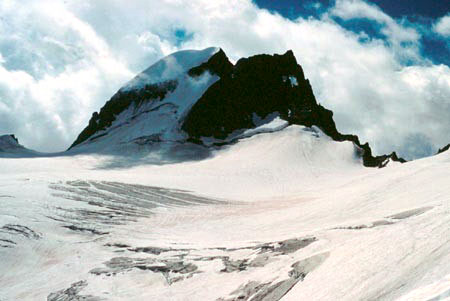
Gannett Peak

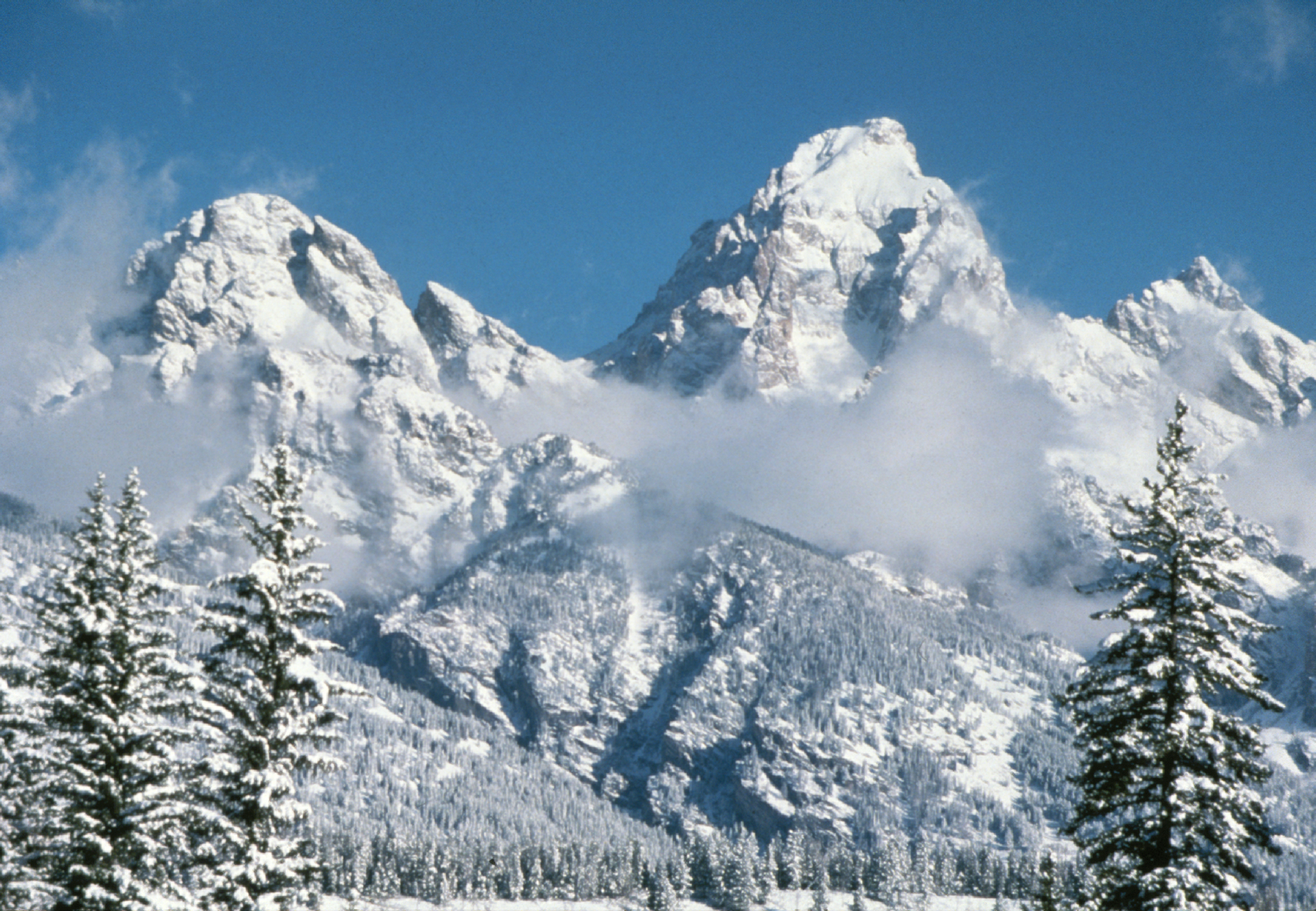
Grand Teton

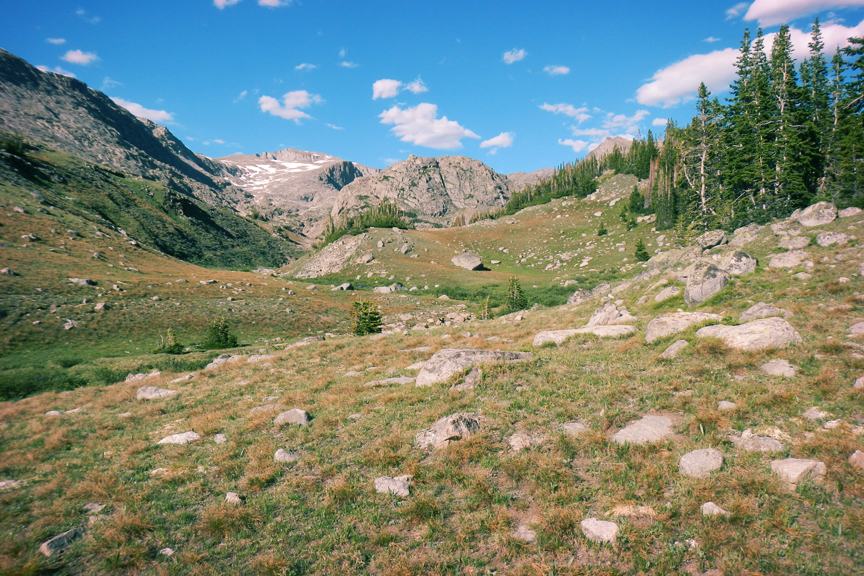
Cloud Peak

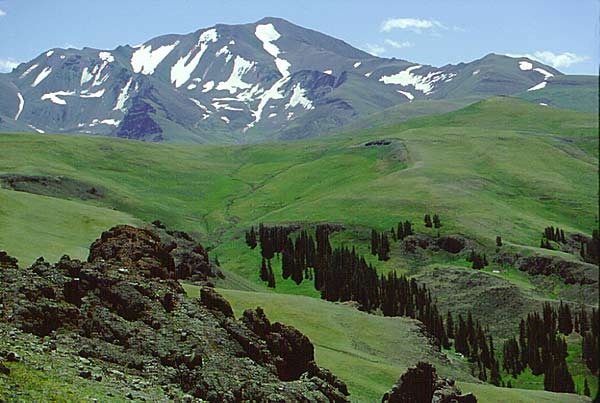
Francs Peak

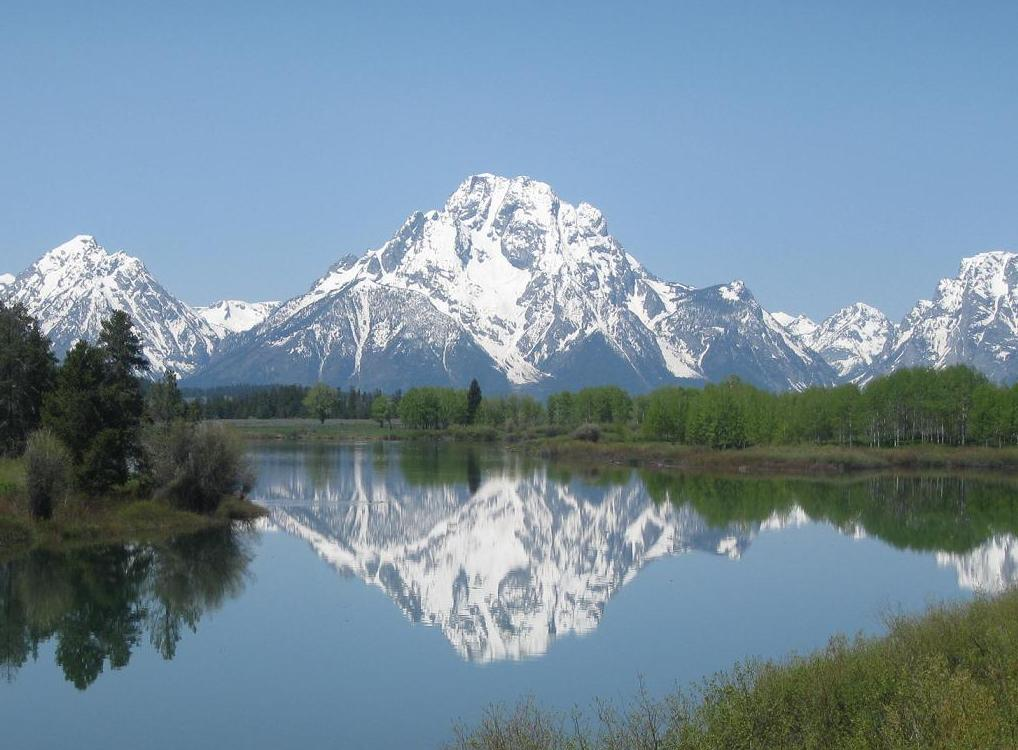
Mount Moran

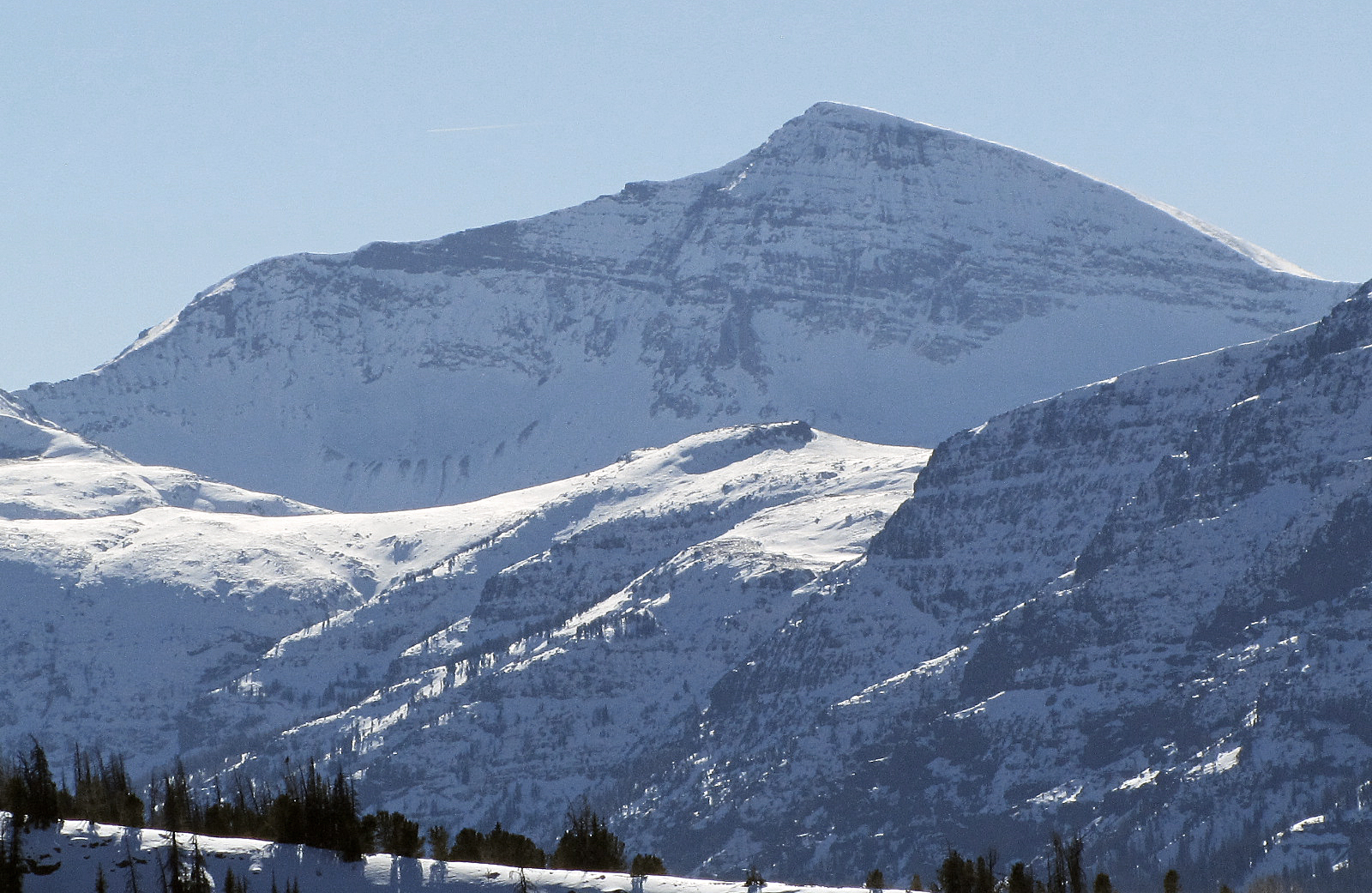
Younts Peak

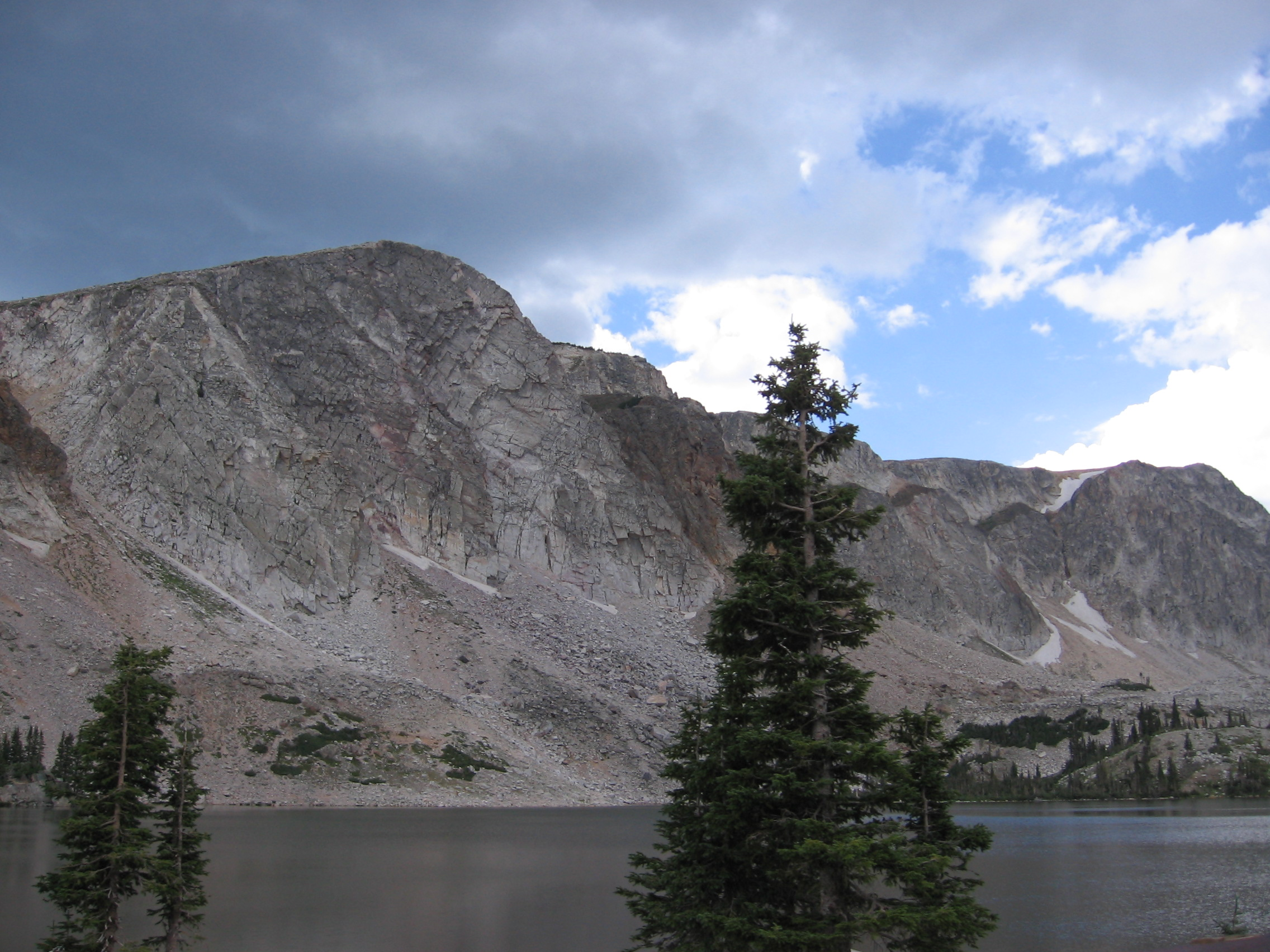
Medicine Bow Peak

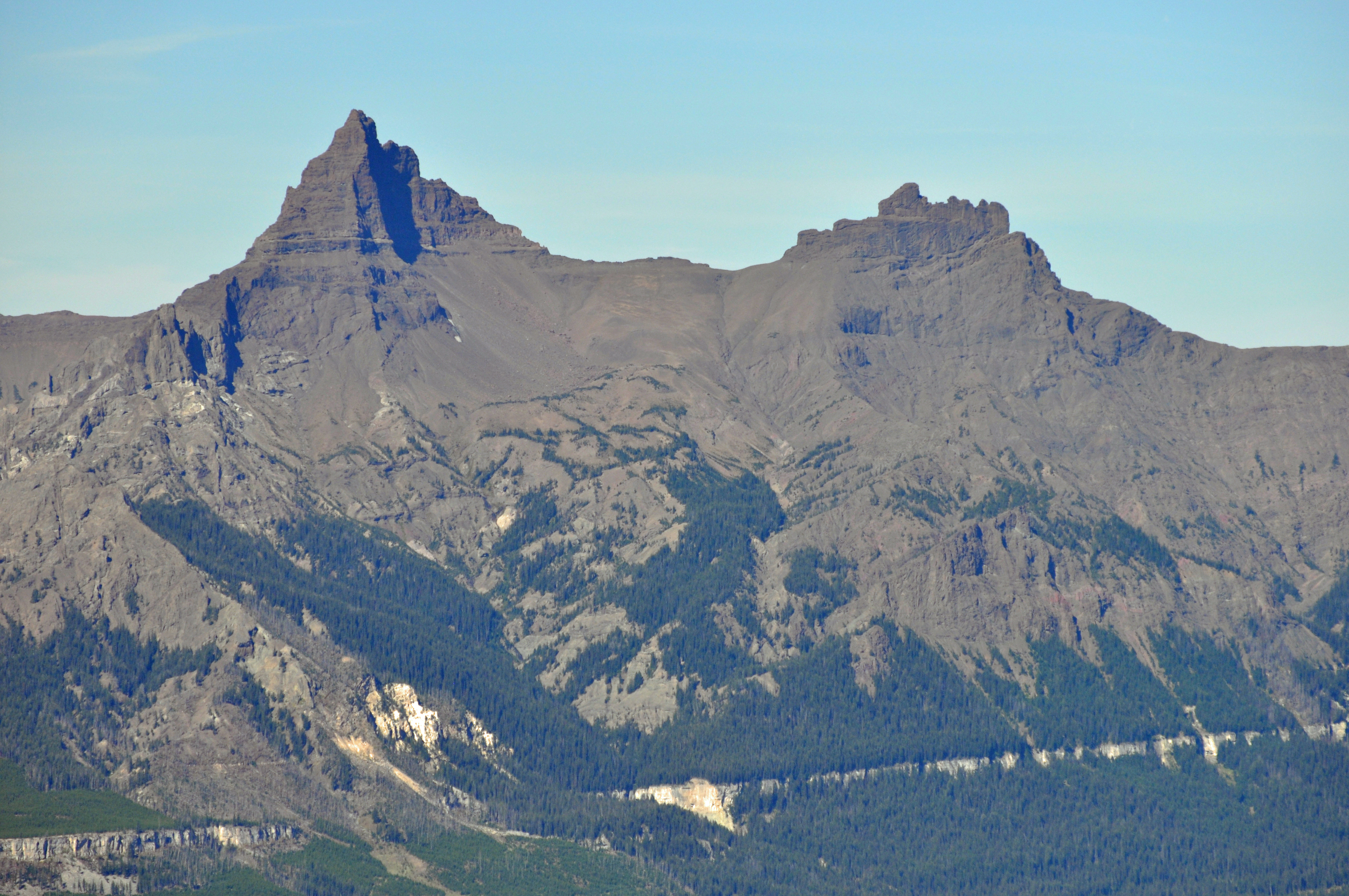
Pilot Peak

== See also ==
- List of mountain peaks of North America
  - List of mountain peaks of Greenland
  - List of mountain peaks of Canada
  - List of mountain peaks of the Rocky Mountains
  - List of mountain peaks of the United States
    - List of mountain peaks of Alaska
    - List of mountain peaks of Arizona
    - List of mountain peaks of California
    - List of mountain peaks of Colorado
    - List of mountain peaks of Hawaiʻi
    - List of mountain peaks of Idaho
    - List of mountain peaks of Montana
    - List of mountain peaks of Nevada
    - List of mountain peaks of New Mexico
    - List of mountain peaks of Oregon
    - List of mountain peaks of Utah
    - List of mountain peaks of Washington (state)
    - List of mountain peaks of Wyoming
      - List of mountains of Wyoming
  - List of mountain peaks of México
  - List of mountain peaks of Central America
  - List of mountain peaks of the Caribbean
- Wyoming
  - Geography of Wyoming
    - Category:Mountains of Wyoming
      - commons:Category:Mountains of Wyoming
- Physical geography
  - Topography
    - Topographic elevation
    - Topographic prominence
    - Topographic isolation
