= Indian Peak (Wyoming) =

Mountain in Wyoming, United States

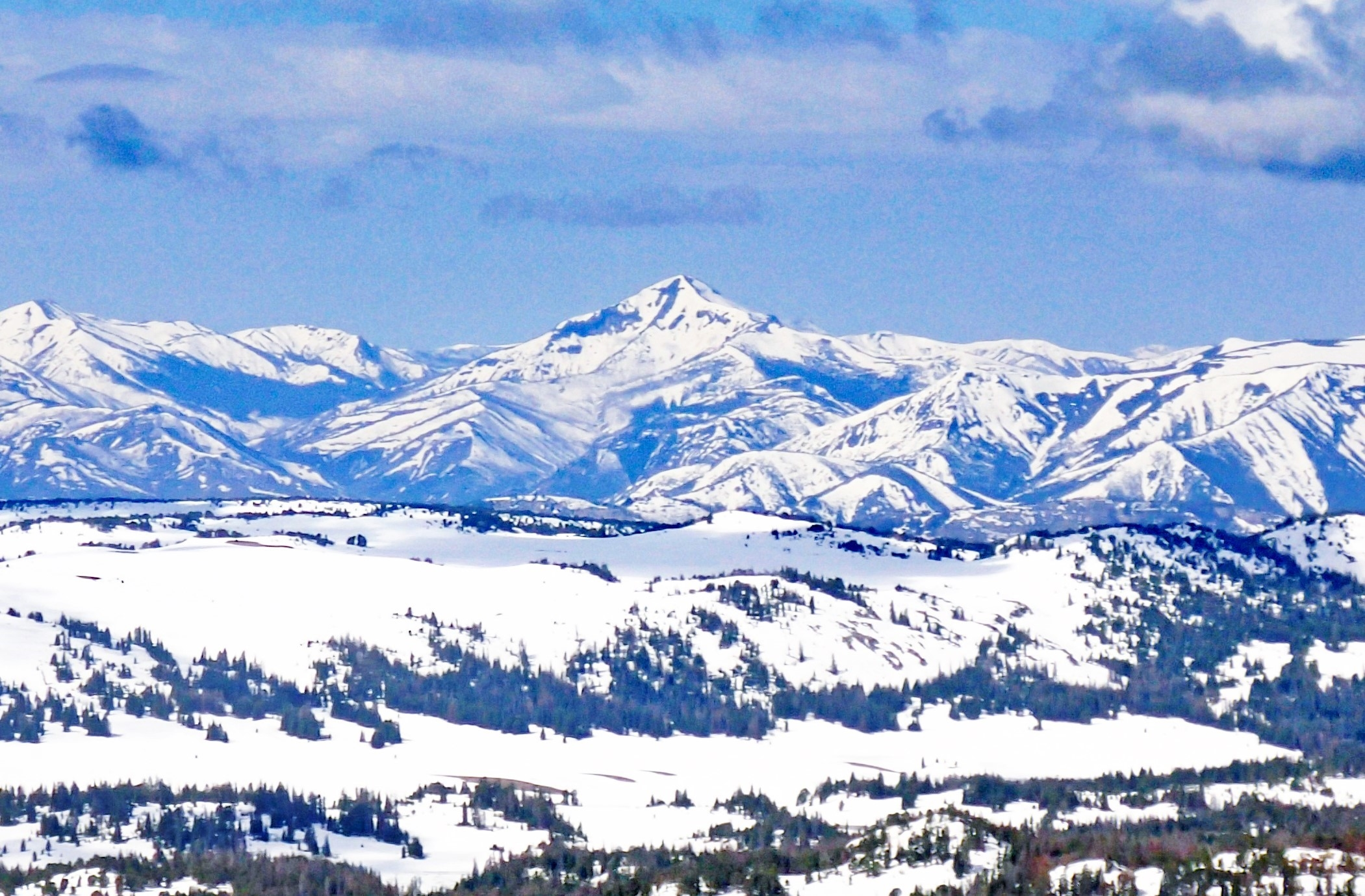
- Northeast aspect, from Beartooth Highway

Highest point
- Elevation: 10,929 ft (3,331 m)
- Prominence: 1,689 ft (515 m)
- Parent peak: Hurricane Mesa
- Isolation: 5.62 mi (9.04 km)
- Listing: Mountain peaks of Wyoming (#23); Major summits of the US (#320)
- Coordinates: 44°46′39″N 109°51′12″W

Geography
- Location within Wyoming Location within the United States
- Country: United States
- State: Wyoming
- County: Park
- Protected area: North Absaroka Wilderness
- Parent range: Absaroka Range; Rocky Mountains
- Topo map: USGS Hurricane Mesa

Indian Peak is a 10,929-foot-elevation (3,331-meter) mountain summit in Park County, Wyoming, United States.

== Description ==
This remote peak is situated less than three miles (4.8 km) east of Yellowstone National Park in the North Absaroka Wilderness, on land managed by Shoshone National Forest. It is part of the Absaroka Range which is a subrange of Rocky Mountains. Precipitation runoff from the mountain drains north to Timber Creek and south to Papoose Creek, which are both part of the Yellowstone River drainage basin. Topographic relief is significant as the summit rises over 2,900 feet (884 meters) above Papoose Creek in 1.4 miles (2.3 km). The mountain's toponym has been officially adopted by the United States Board on Geographic Names, and has appeared in publications since at least 1899. This mountain has also been known as Papoose Peak and Papoose Benchmark.

== Climate ==
According to the Köppen climate classification system, Indian Peak is located in an alpine subarctic climate zone with long, cold, snowy winters, and cool to mild summers. Winter temperatures can drop below 0 °F with wind chill factors below −10 °F.

== See also ==
- List of mountain peaks of Wyoming
- Geology of the Rocky Mountains
