= Hurricane Mesa (Wyoming) =

Mountain in Wyoming, United States

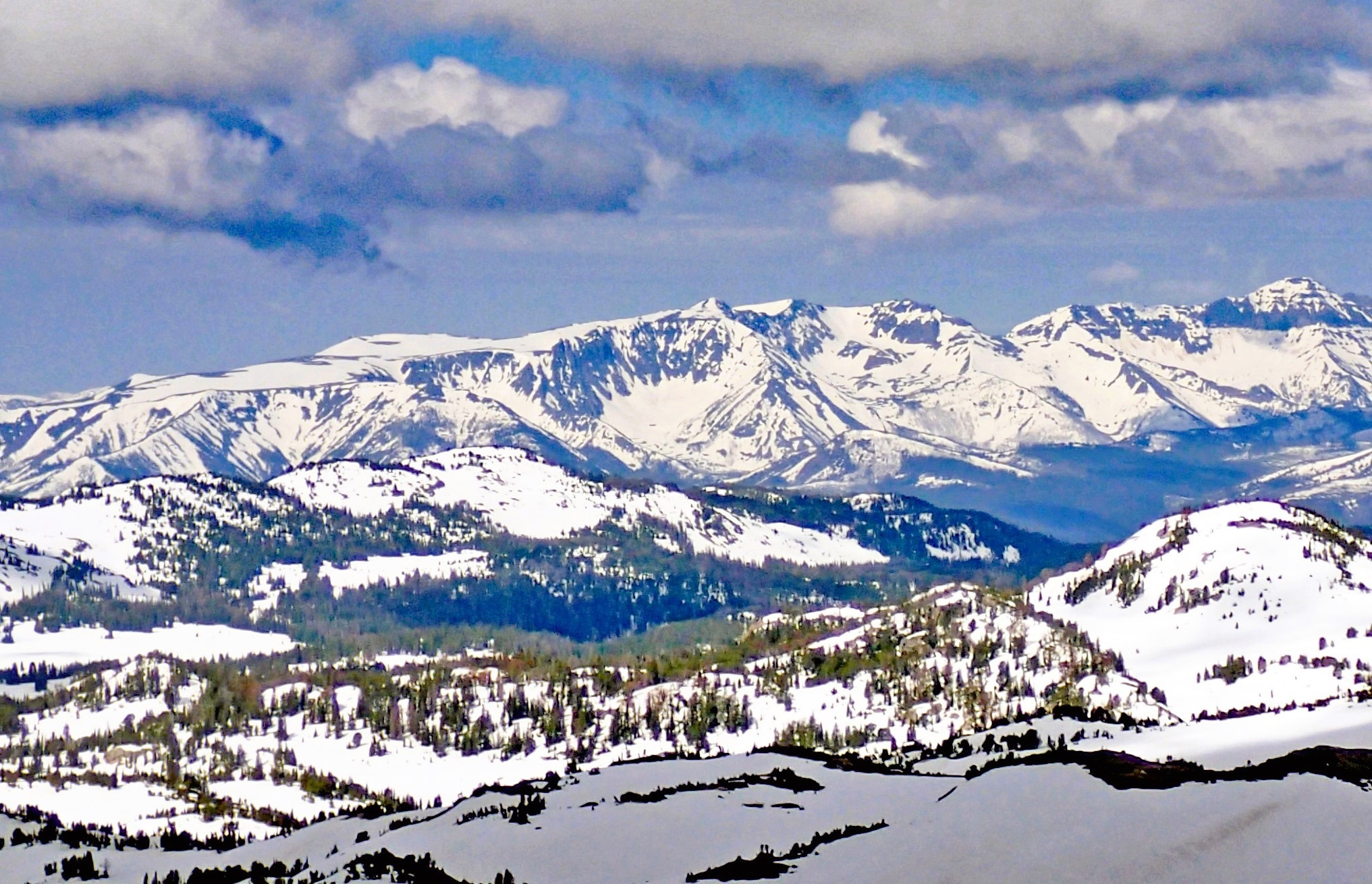
- Hurricane Mesa centered on skyline

Highest point
- Elevation: 11,069 ft (3,374 m)
- Prominence: 819 ft (250 m)
- Parent peak: Peak 11255
- Isolation: 2.65 mi (4.26 km)
- Coordinates: 44°51′08″N 109°48′30″W

Dimensions
- Length: 5 mi (8.0 km) East-West
- Width: 3 mi (4.8 km) North-South

Geography
- Location within Wyoming Location within the United States
- Country: United States
- State: Wyoming
- County: Park
- Protected area: North Absaroka Wilderness
- Parent range: Absaroka Range; Rocky Mountains
- Topo map: USGS Hurricane Mesa

Geology
- Rock age: Eocene
- Rock type: Extrusive rock

Hurricane Mesa is an 11,069-foot-elevation (3,374-meter) mountain summit in Park County, Wyoming, United States.

== Description ==
This remote mountain is located approximately six miles (9.7 km) east of Yellowstone National Park in the North Absaroka Wilderness, on land managed by Shoshone National Forest. It is part of the Absaroka Range which is a subrange of Rocky Mountains. Precipitation runoff from the mountain drains into tributaries of Crandall Creek which is part of the Yellowstone River drainage basin. Topographic relief is significant as the summit rises nearly 3,700 feet (1,128 meters) above North Fork Crandall Creek in 1.25 miles (2.01 km). The mountain's toponym has been officially adopted by the United States Board on Geographic Names, and has appeared in publications since at least 1925.

== Climate ==
According to the Köppen climate classification system, Hurricane Mesa is located in an alpine subarctic climate zone with long, cold, snowy winters, and cool to mild summers. Winter temperatures can drop below 0 °F with wind chill factors below −10 °F.

== See also ==
- List of mountain peaks of Wyoming
- Geology of the Rocky Mountains
