= Lizard Head Glacier =

Glacier in Wyoming

- Location within Wyoming
- Type: Mountain glacier
- Location: Fremont County, Wyoming, USA
- Coordinates: 42°47′34″N 109°12′23″W
- Area: 50 acres (20 ha)
- Length: .20 mi (0.32 km)
- Width: .40 mi (0.64 km)
- Terminus: Talus
- Status: Unknown

Lizard Head Glacier is located in Shoshone National Forest, in the U.S. state of Wyoming, .35 miles (0.56 km) WNW of Lizard Head Peak. The glacier descends from 12,400 to 11,200 ft (3,800 to 3,400 m) and is north of and not observable from the popular climbing destination known as the Cirque of the Towers.

== See also ==
- List of glaciers in the United States
