= Two Ocean Mountain =

Mountain in Wyoming, United States

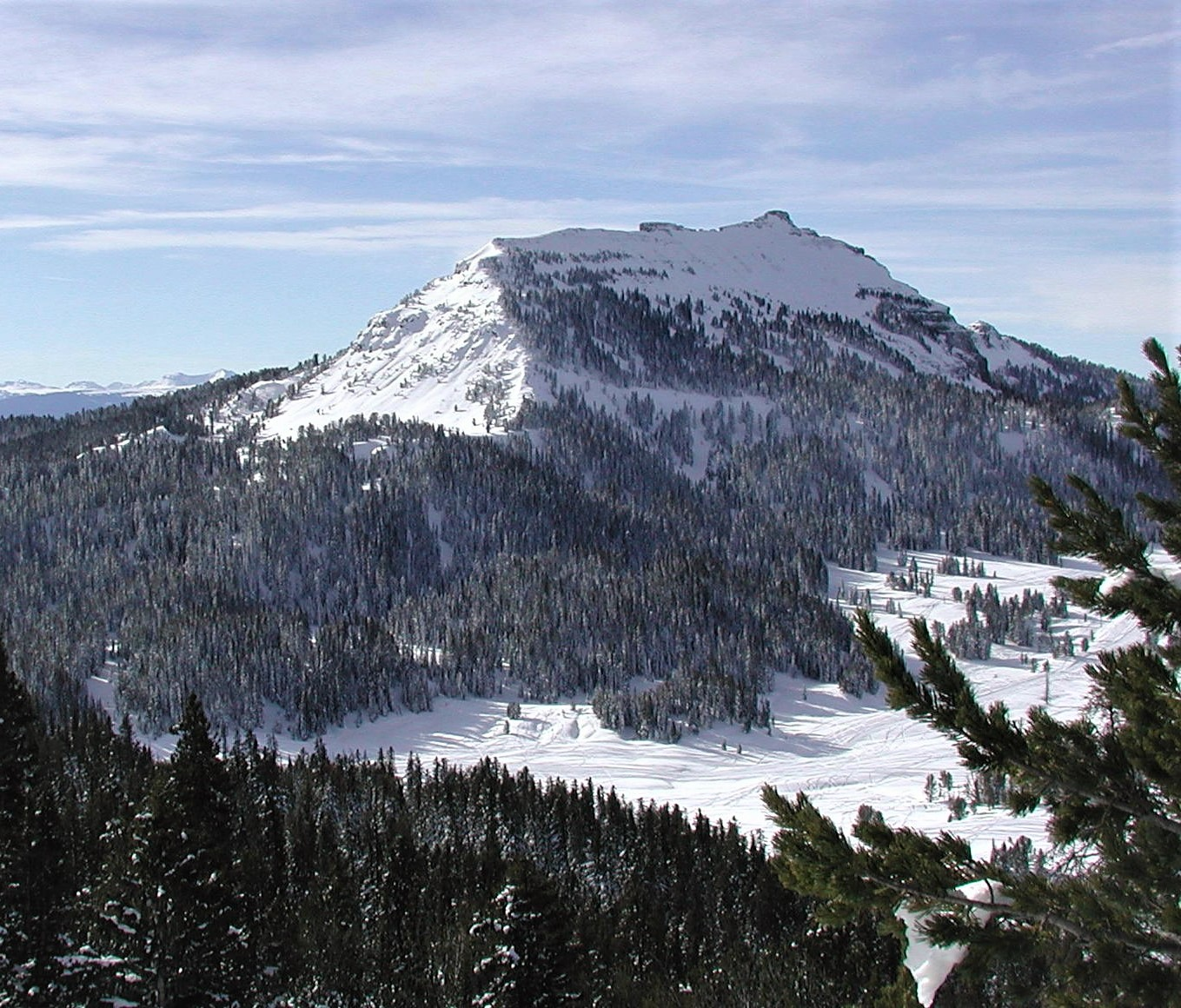
- Northeast aspect

Highest point
- Elevation: 10,724 ft (3,269 m)
- Prominence: 1,184 ft (361 m)
- Parent peak: Brooks Mountain (11,060 ft)
- Isolation: 2.28 mi (3.67 km)
- Coordinates: 43°44′28″N 110°05′09″W

Geography
- Location within Wyoming Location within the United States
- Country: United States
- State: Wyoming
- County: Teton
- Protected area: Bridger-Teton National Forest
- Parent range: Rocky Mountains; Wind River Range
- Topo map: USGS Lava Mountain

Geology
- Rock type: Breccia

Climbing
- Easiest route: class 4 scrambling

Two Ocean Mountain is a 10,724-foot-elevation (3,269-meter) summit in Teton County, Wyoming, United States.

== Description ==
Two Ocean Mountain is the northernmost peak of the Wind River Range which is a subrange of the Rocky Mountains. It is set along the Continental Divide, one mile southwest of Togwotee Pass, on land managed by Bridger-Teton National Forest. The nearest towns are Jackson 39 miles (63 km) to the southwest and Dubois, 27 miles (43 km) to the southeast. Precipitation runoff from the mountain drains east into headwaters of the Wind River and ultimately the Atlantic Ocean, whereas the west slope drains into tributaries of the Snake River and ultimately the Pacific Ocean. The east slope of the mountain is the source of the Wind River and topographic relief is modest as the summit rises 1,400 feet (430 meters) above the river in 1.25 mile (2 km). Two Ocean Mountain can be seen from the Wyoming Centennial Scenic Byway which provides year-round access to the mountain except during blizzards. The mountain was called "the Two Ocean Mountain winter sports area" in the mid-1900s. The mountain's toponym has been officially adopted by the United States Board on Geographic Names.

== Climate ==
According to the Köppen climate classification system, Two Ocean Mountain is located in a subarctic climate zone with long, cold, snowy winters, and cool to warm summers. Due to its altitude, it receives precipitation all year, as snow in winter and as thunderstorms in summer.

== Hazards ==
Encountering bears is a concern in the Wind River Range. There are other concerns as well, including bugs, wildfires, adverse snow conditions and nighttime cold temperatures.

Importantly, there have been notable incidents, including accidental deaths, due to falls from steep cliffs (a misstep could be fatal in this class 4/5 terrain) and due to falling rocks, over the years, including 1993, 2007 (involving an experienced NOLS leader), 2015 and 2018. Other incidents include a seriously injured backpacker being airlifted near Squaretop Mountain in 2005, and a fatal hiker incident (from an apparent accidental fall) in 2006 that involved state search and rescue. The U.S. Forest Service does not offer updated aggregated records on the official number of fatalities in the Wind River Range.

== See also ==
- List of mountain peaks of Wyoming
- Mountains of Teton County, Wyoming
