= Barronette Peak =

Mountain in Wyoming, United States

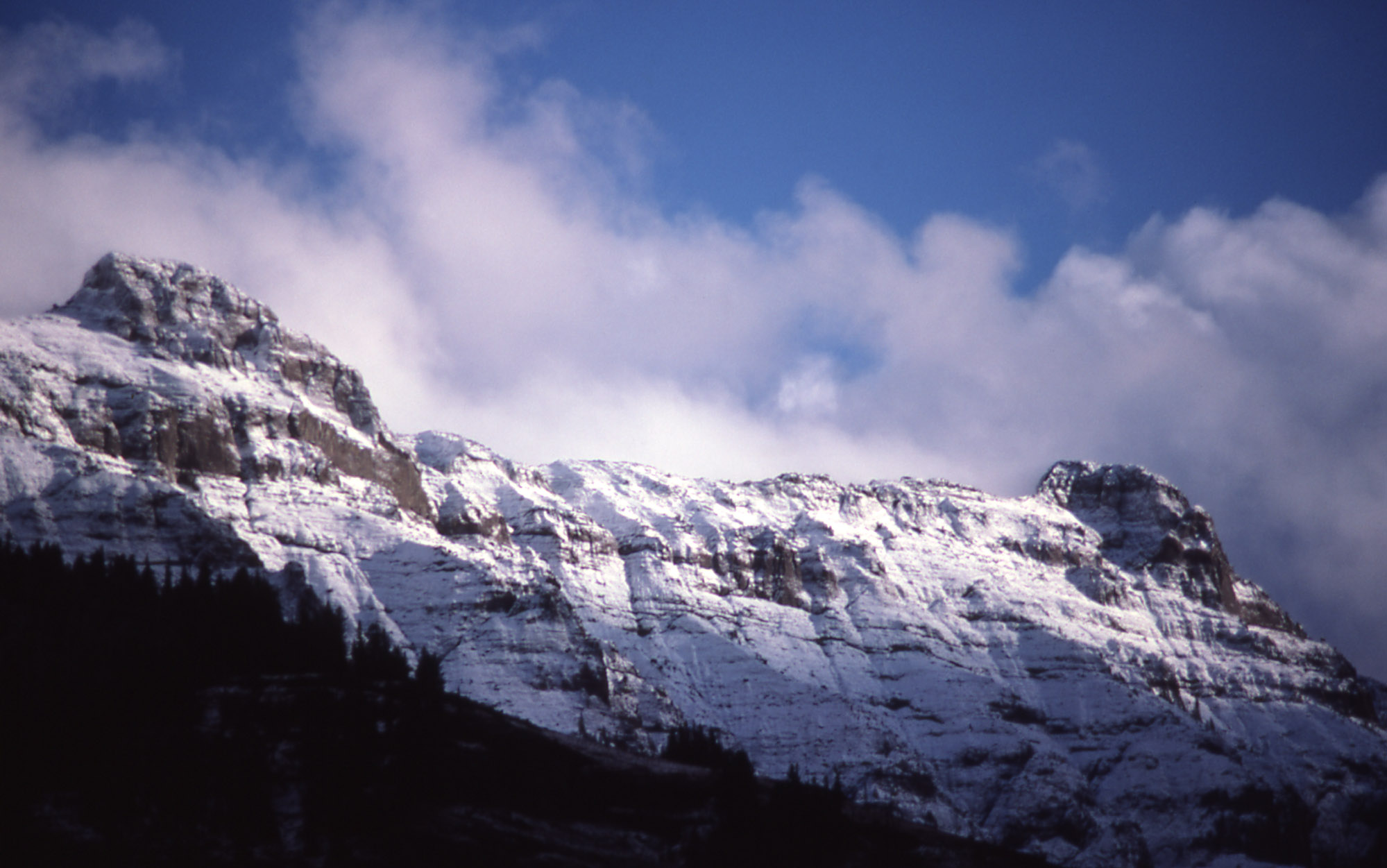
- 1977

Highest point
- Elevation: 10,354 ft (3,156 m)
- Coordinates: 44°58′31″N 110°05′19″W

Geography
- Location: Yellowstone National Park, Park County, Wyoming
- Parent range: Absaroka Range
- Topo map: Abiathar Peak

Barronette Peak, elevation 10,354 feet (3,156 m), is a mountain peak in the Absaroka Range, in the northeast section of Yellowstone National Park. The peak is named for Collins Jack (John H. "Yellowstone Jack") Baronette (1829–1901). It was named by the Hayden Geological Survey of 1878, which misspelled it as Barronette; the peak retains the official misspelled name today.

Jack Baronette was an early Yellowstone guide and entrepreneur. He built and operated the first bridge across the Yellowstone River near the confluence of the Lamar River in 1871 to service miners traveling to Cooke City, Montana. In 1870, as a resident of Helena, Montana, he participated in the search for and rescue of Truman C. Everts, lost during the Washburn–Langford–Doane Expedition of 1870. In 1884, he was considered for the superintendency of Yellowstone.

Images of Barronette Peak
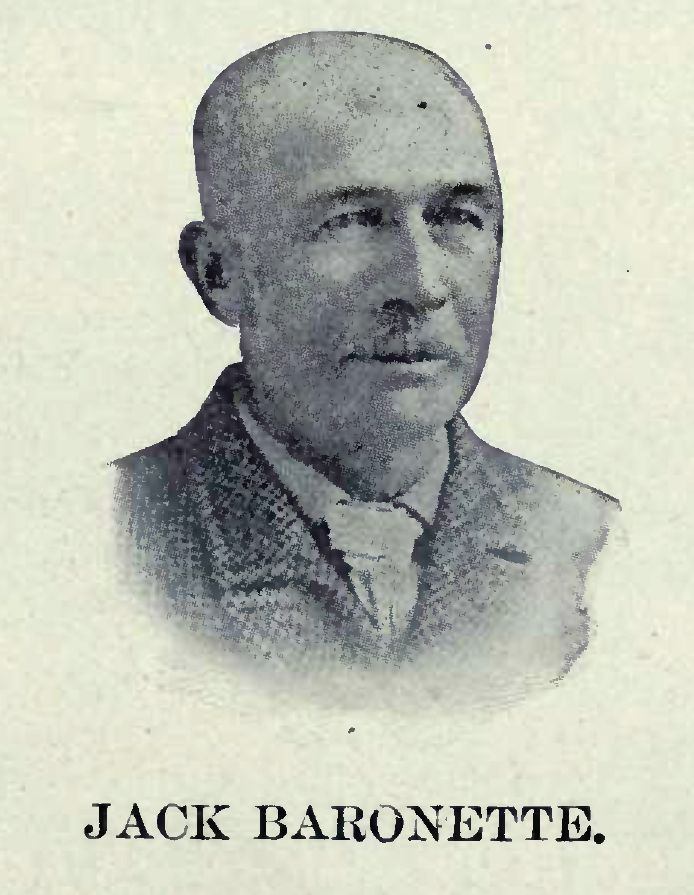
Barronette Peak's namesake, Jack Baronette

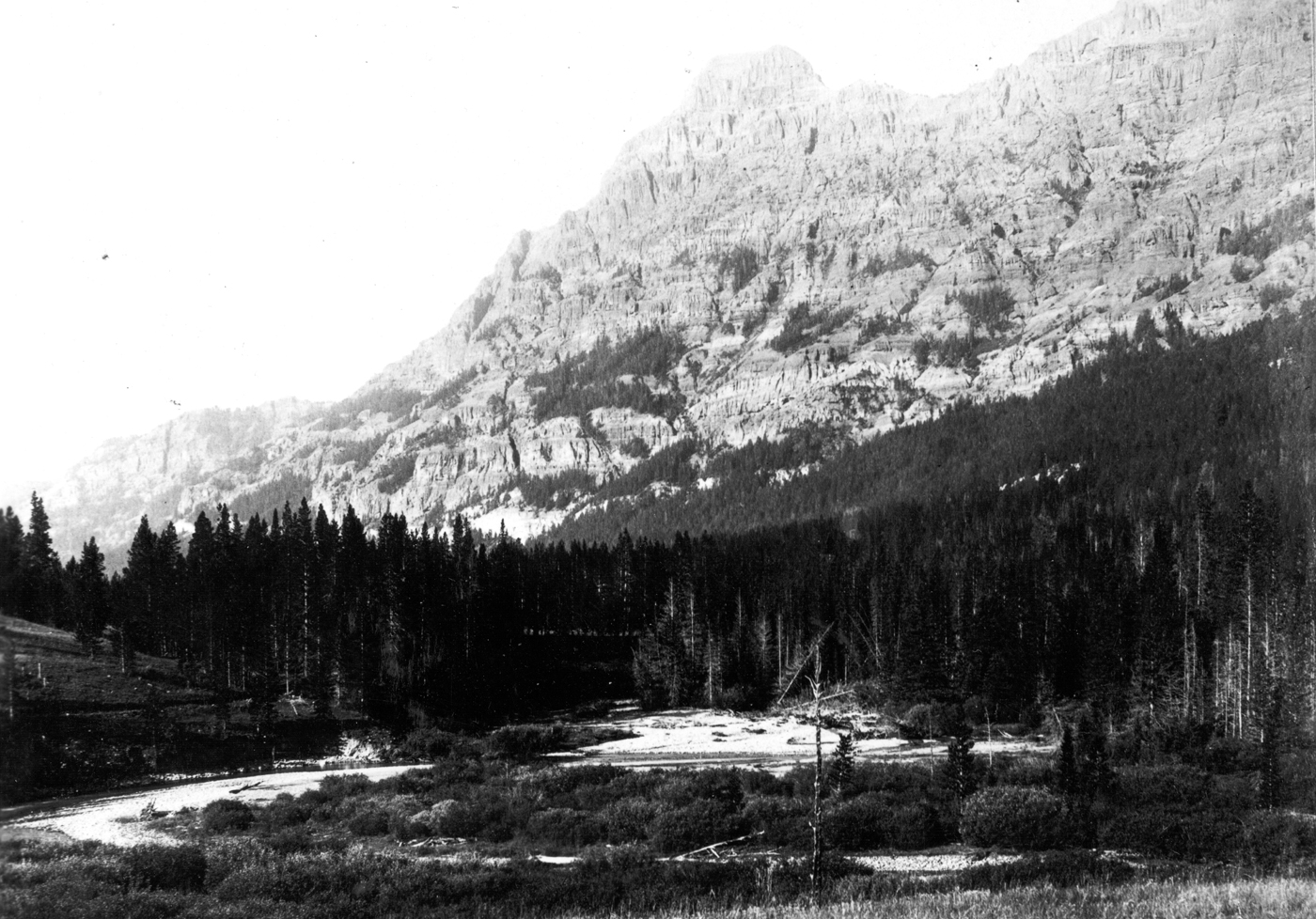
Barronette Peak, ca 1890

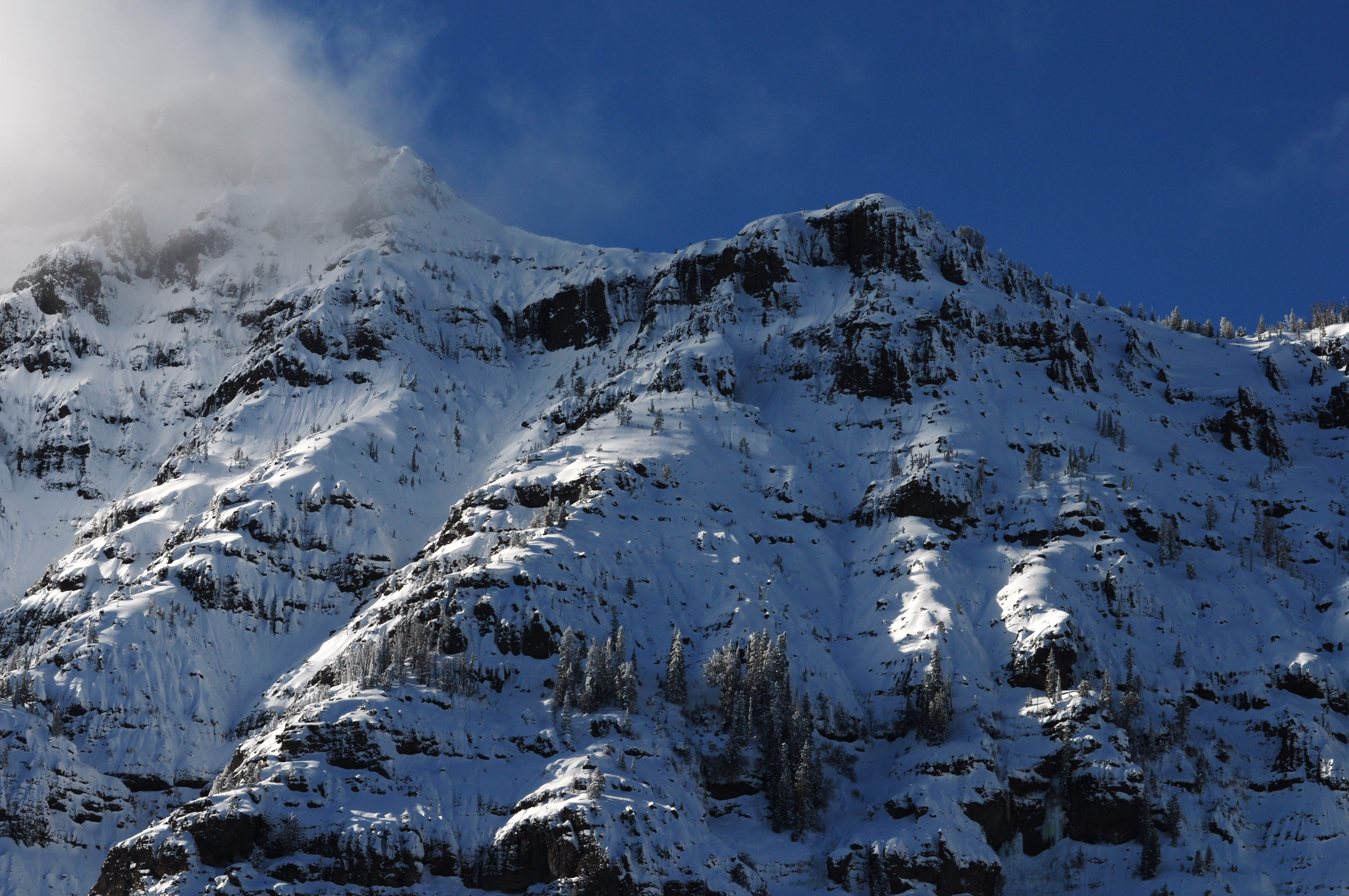
January, 2010

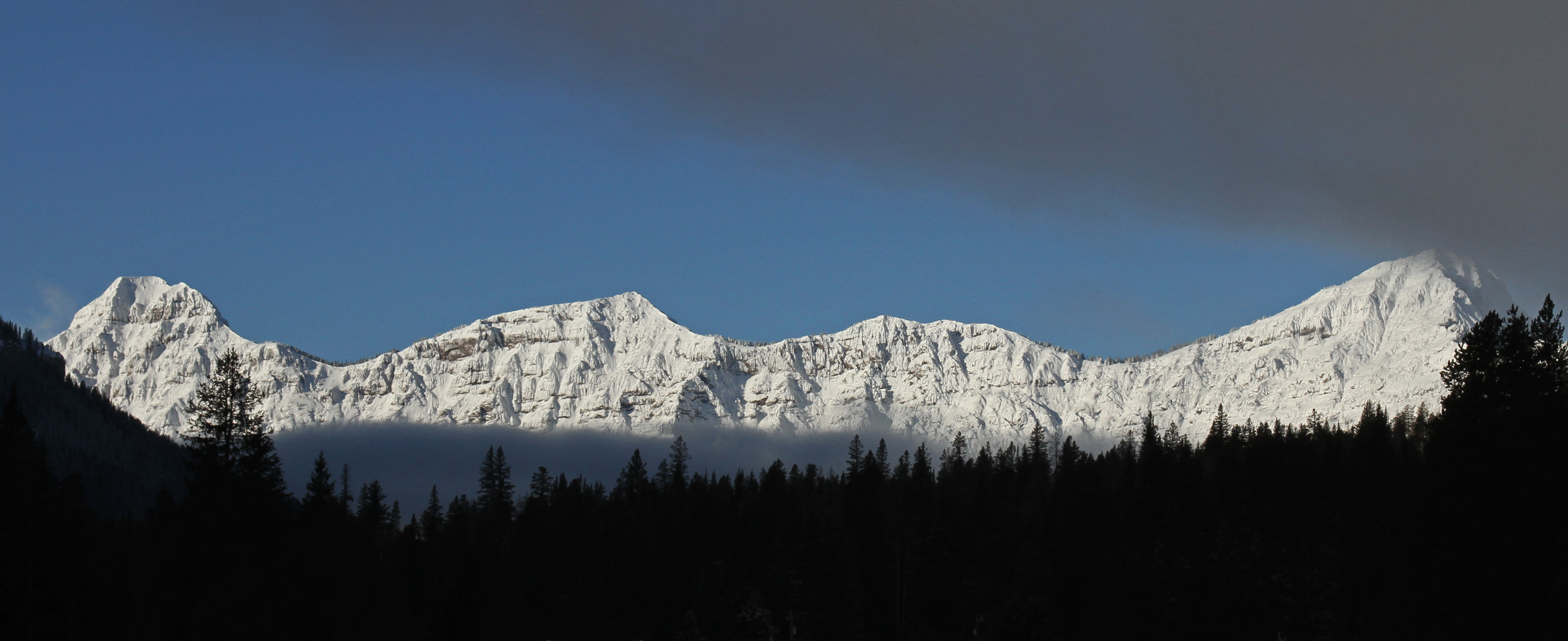
Barronette Peak panorama

== See also ==
- Mountains and mountain ranges of Yellowstone National Park
