= Red Mountains =

Norwegian band

- Origin: Trondheim, Norway
- Genres: Stoner/desert rock, psychedelic rock
- Years active: 2013-present
- Labels: All Good Clean Records, Nasoni Records
- Members: Sverre Dalen, Simen Mathiassen, Magnus Riise, Jostein Wigenstad

Red Mountains is a Norwegian stoner rock band. They have released two full-length albums, Down With The Sun (2015) and Slow Wander (2017).

== History ==
The band formed in 2013 with current members Sverre Dalen (bass), Simen Mathiassen (drums), Magnus Riise (guitar, vocals) and Jostein Wigenstad (guitar).

Down With The Sun was recorded at Fjøset Lydstudio, produced and recorded by Eirik Øien during 2014. Two of the songs were recorded by the band themselves at Høgskolen i Nord-Trøndelag.

Slow Wander was recorded and produced by Spidergawd frontman Per Borten at Sørgården Studio during 2016/17. Both albums were released on 1 September 2015 and 2017 respectively.

In 2015, they played the Pstereo festival in Trondheim, Norway.

== Discography ==
Albums

- Down With The Sun (2015)
- Slow Wander (2017)

Singles

- Sun (2015)
- Nomads (2016)
- Rat King (2017)
- Like Dunes Like Ocean (2024)
