= Lizard Head Peak =

Mountain in the state of Wyoming

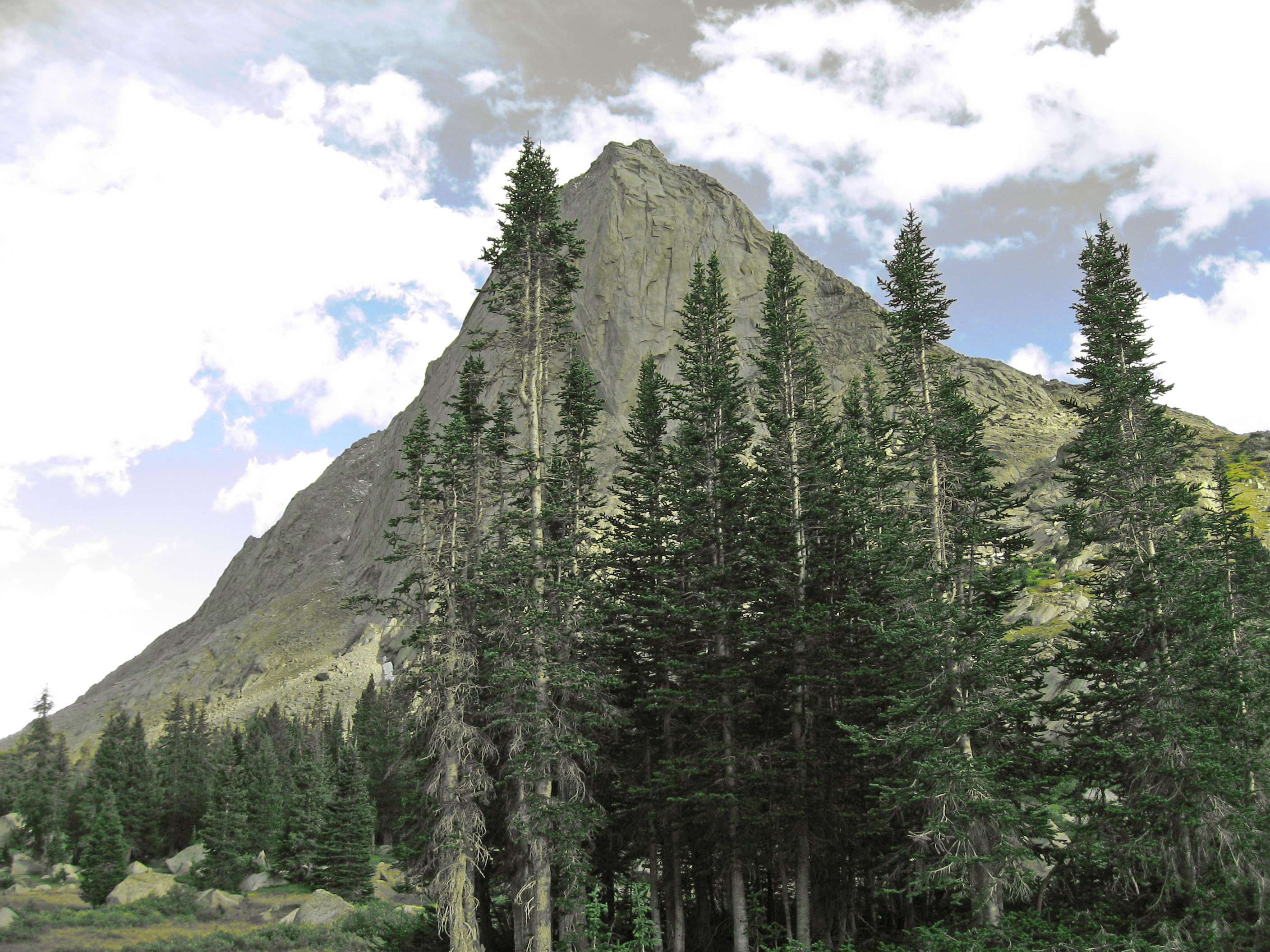
- Lizard Head Peak

Highest point
- Elevation: 12,847 ft (3,916 m)
- Prominence: 1,882 ft (574 m)
- Coordinates: 42°47′24″N 109°11′49″W

Geography
- Location within Wyoming Location within the United States
- Location: Fremont County, Wyoming, U.S.
- Parent range: Wind River Range
- Topo map: USGS Lizard Head Peak

Lizard Head Peak (12,847 feet (3,916 m)) is in the southern Wind River Range in the U.S. state of Wyoming. Situated in Shoshone National Forest, Lizard Head Peak is the northeasternmost peak in the Cirque of the Towers, a popular climbing area. Lizard Head Glacier is just WNW of the peak.

== Mountain ==
Lizard Head Peak is the third highest peak in the southern Winds, though it is slightly east of the Continental Divide. Similarly with other mountains in the region, Lizard Head is made entirely of granite.

Lizard Head Peak overlooks Lizard Head Meadows to its south, a wetland that floods in the spring with a trail that runs west towards the Cirque of the Towers (roughly one mile southwest of Lizard Head Peak). The northwest of Lizard Head holds the South Fork Glacier, with another smaller glacier on its true north face.

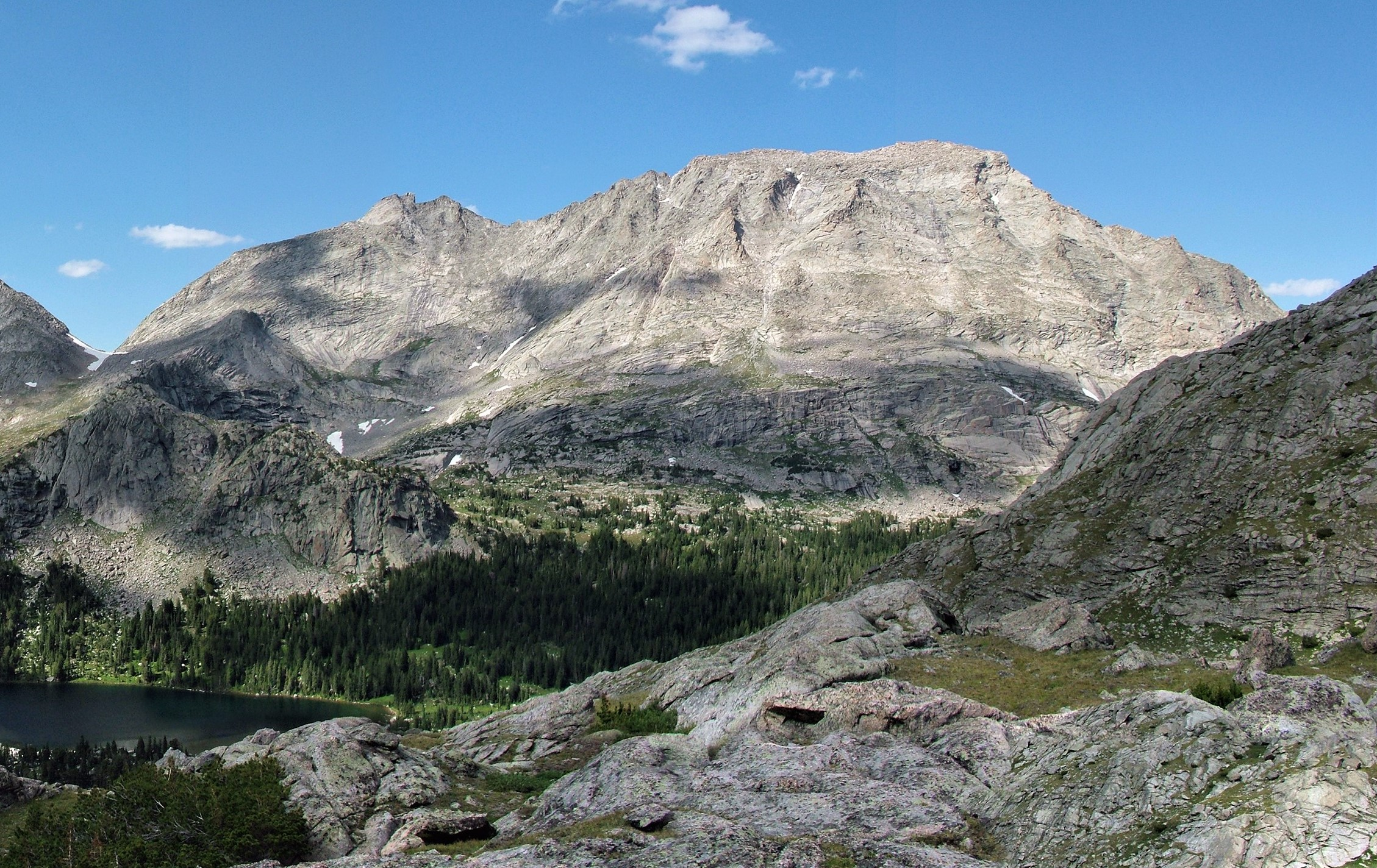
Lizard Head Peak, south aspect
