= Mount Nystrom =

Mountain in Wyoming, United States

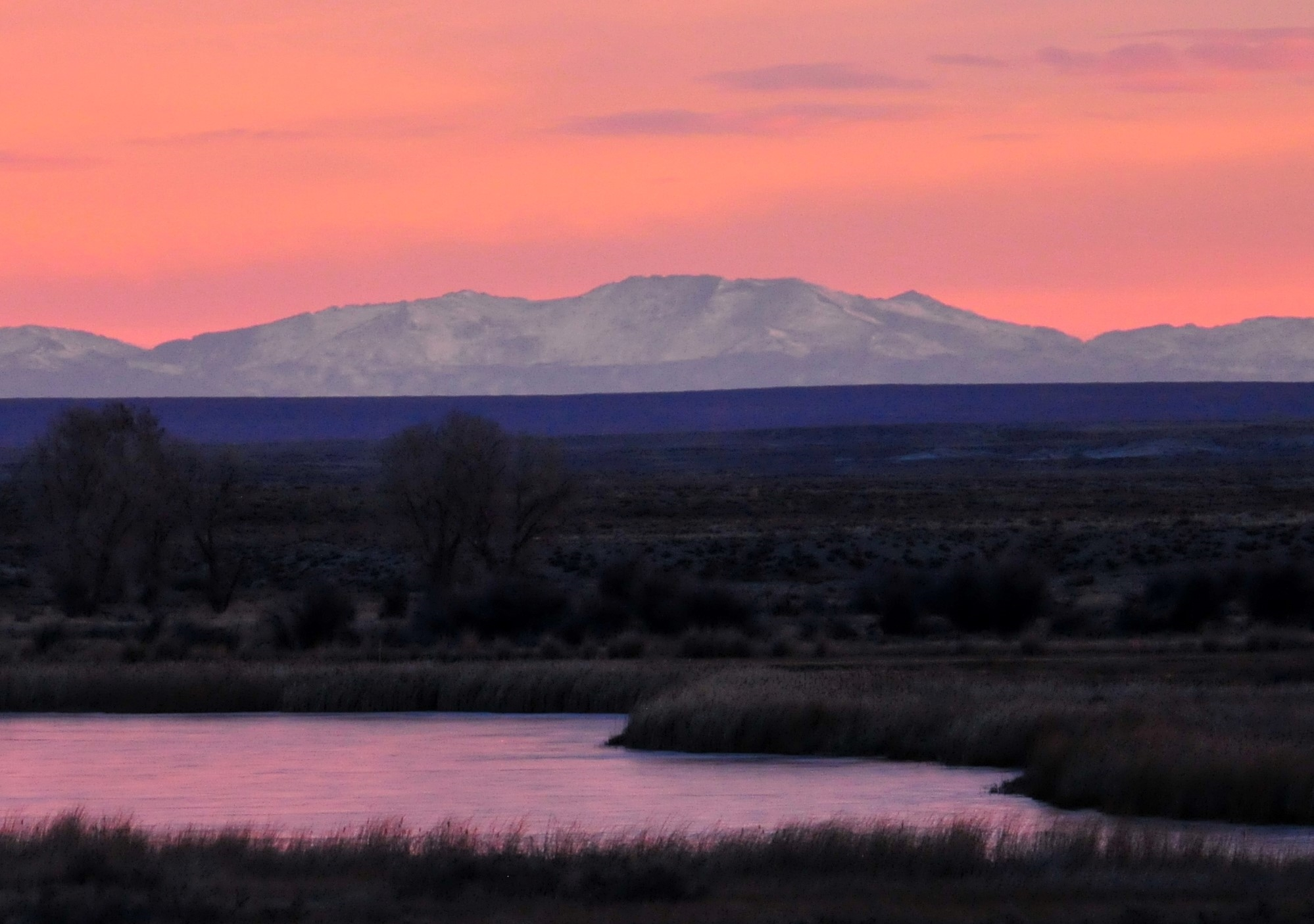
- Southwest aspect

Highest point
- Elevation: 12,361 ft (3,768 m)
- Prominence: 1,796 ft (547 m)
- Listing: Mountains of Wyoming
- Coordinates: 42°38′20″N 109°05′39″W

Geography
- Location within Wyoming Location within the United States
- Location: Fremont and Sublette Counties, Wyoming, U.S.
- Parent range: Wind River Range
- Topo map: USGS Sweetwater Gap

Climbing
- First ascent: 1922, Finis Mitchell

Mount Nystrom (12,361 feet (3,768 m)) is located in the southern Wind River Range in the U.S. state of Wyoming. Mount Nystrom sits along the Continental Divide. The mountain was named in 1877 by F. M. Endlich of the Hayden Survey for his fiancée’s maiden name.

== Hazards ==
Encountering bears is a concern in the Wind River Range. There are other concerns as well, including bugs, wildfires, adverse snow conditions and nighttime cold temperatures.

Importantly, there have been notable incidents, including accidental deaths, due to falls from steep cliffs (a misstep could be fatal in this class 4/5 terrain) and due to falling rocks, over the years, including 1993, 2007 (involving an experienced NOLS leader), 2015 and 2018. Other incidents include a seriously injured backpacker being airlifted near SquareTop Mountain in 2005, and a fatal hiker incident (from an apparent accidental fall) in 2006 that involved state search and rescue. The U.S. Forest Service does not offer updated aggregated records on the official number of fatalities in the Wind River Range.
