= Atlantic Peak =

Mountain in Wyoming, United States

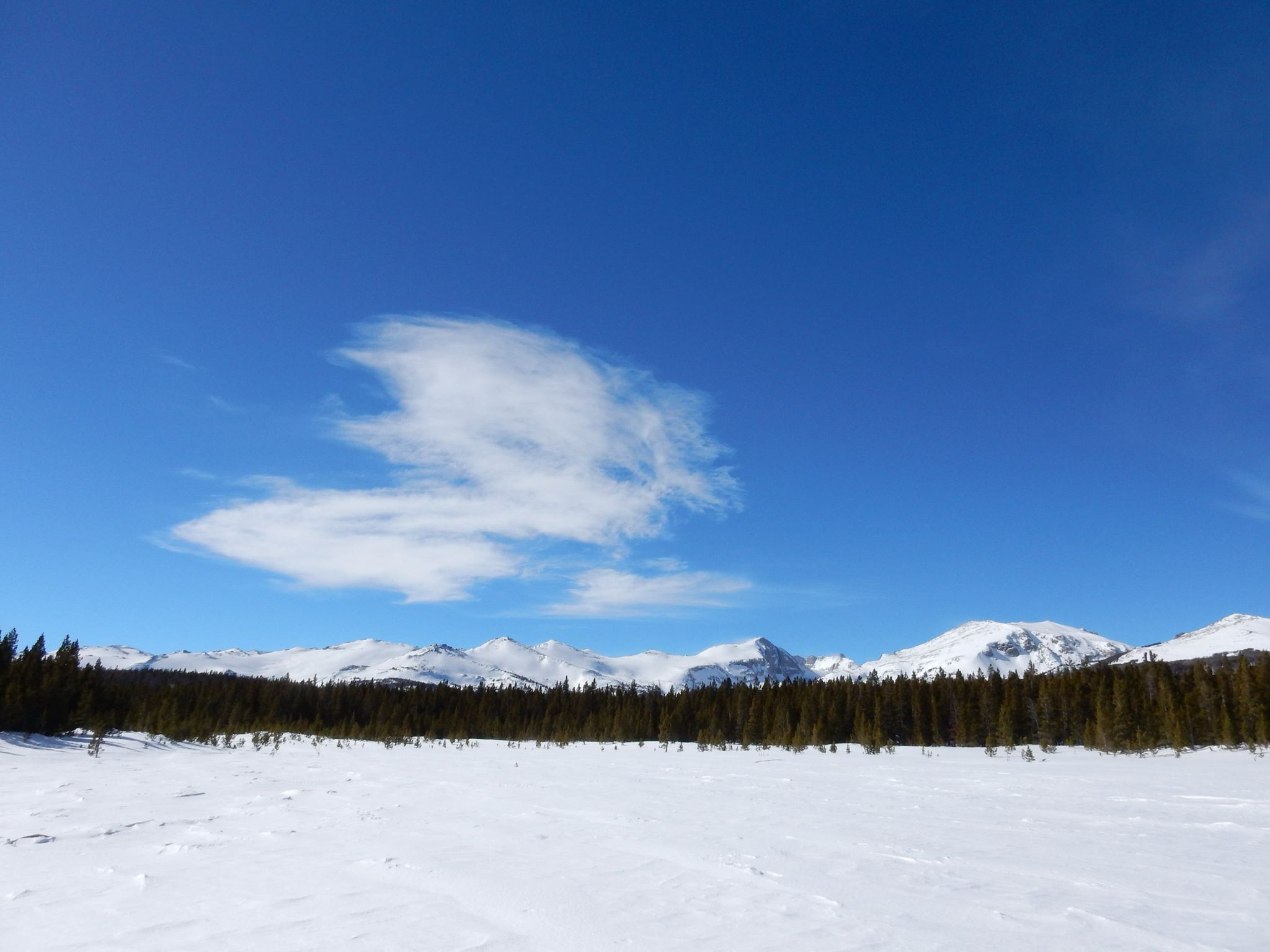
- Atlantic Peak in February 2017

Highest point
- Elevation: 12,495 ft (3,808 m)
- Prominence: 2,130 ft (650 m)
- Coordinates: 42°36′59″N 109°00′04″W

Geography
- Location within Wyoming Location within the United States
- Location: Fremont and Sublette Counties, Wyoming, U.S.
- Parent range: Wind River Range
- Topo map: USGS Sweetwater Needles

Climbing
- First ascent: 1877 (George Chittenden, Edward Clymer, Frederic Endlich and Charles Howes)

Atlantic Peak (12,495 feet (3,808 m)) is located in the southern Wind River Range in the U.S. state of Wyoming. Atlantic Peak sits along the Continental Divide, less than 1 mi (1.6 km) southeast of West Atlantic Peak.

== Climate ==
Climate data for Atlantic Peak 42.6160 N, 109.0020 W, Elevation: 12,021 ft (3,664 m) (1991–2020 normals)
Month	Jan	Feb	Mar	Apr	May	Jun	Jul	Aug	Sep	Oct	Nov	Dec	Year
Mean daily maximum °F (°C)	21.3 (−5.9)	20.8 (−6.2)	26.2 (−3.2)	32.3 (0.2)	41.0 (5.0)	51.5 (10.8)	60.7 (15.9)	59.4 (15.2)	50.7 (10.4)	38.3 (3.5)	26.9 (−2.8)	20.6 (−6.3)	37.5 (3.1)
Daily mean °F (°C)	11.1 (−11.6)	9.9 (−12.3)	14.8 (−9.6)	20.0 (−6.7)	28.7 (−1.8)	38.6 (3.7)	47.1 (8.4)	46.0 (7.8)	38.0 (3.3)	26.9 (−2.8)	17.1 (−8.3)	10.9 (−11.7)	25.8 (−3.5)
Mean daily minimum °F (°C)	1.0 (−17.2)	−0.9 (−18.3)	3.5 (−15.8)	7.8 (−13.4)	16.4 (−8.7)	25.8 (−3.4)	33.5 (0.8)	32.6 (0.3)	25.3 (−3.7)	15.5 (−9.2)	7.3 (−13.7)	1.1 (−17.2)	14.1 (−10.0)
Average precipitation inches (mm)	3.75 (95)	3.93 (100)	4.32 (110)	5.40 (137)	5.66 (144)	2.67 (68)	1.49 (38)	1.50 (38)	2.08 (53)	3.07 (78)	3.42 (87)	4.07 (103)	41.36 (1,051)
Source: PRISM Climate Group

== Hazards ==
Encountering bears is a concern in the Wind River Range. There are other concerns as well, including bugs, wildfires, adverse snow conditions and nighttime cold temperatures.

Importantly, there have been notable incidents, including accidental deaths, due to falls from steep cliffs (a misstep could be fatal in this class 4/5 terrain) and due to falling rocks, over the years, including 1993, 2007 (involving an experienced NOLS leader), 2015 and 2018. Other incidents include a seriously injured backpacker being airlifted near SquareTop Mountain in 2005, and a fatal hiker incident (from an apparent accidental fall) in 2006 that involved state search and rescue. The U.S. Forest Service does not offer updated aggregated records on the official number of fatalities in the Wind River Range.
