= Carter Mountain =

Mountain in Wyoming, United States

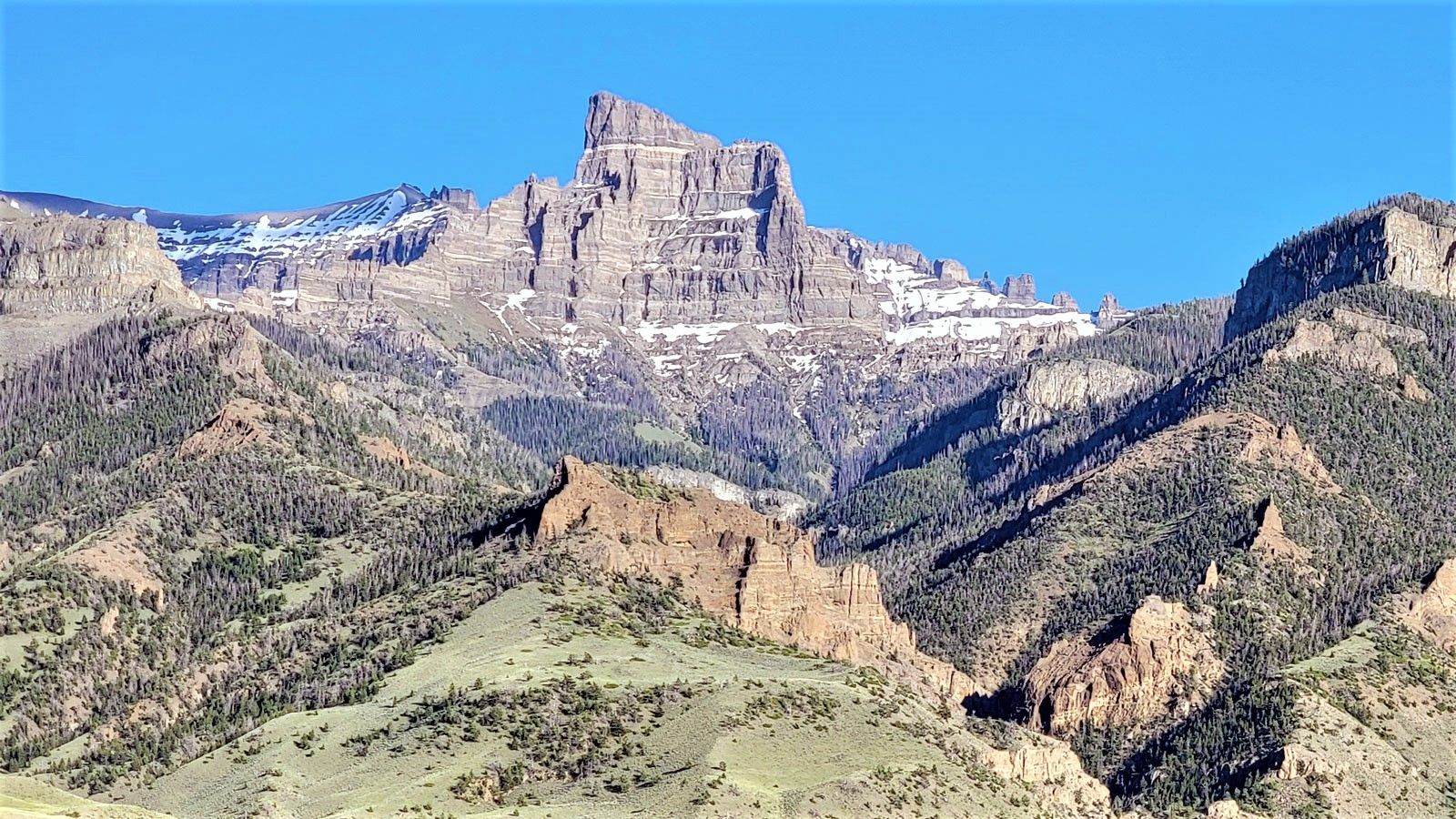

Highest point
- Elevation: 12,324 ft (3,760 m)
- Prominence: 1,679 ft (510 m)
- Coordinates: 44°11′41″N 109°25′08″W

Geography
- Location within Wyoming
- Location: Park County, Wyoming, U.S.
- Parent range: Absaroka Range
- Topo map: USGS Aldrich Basin

Carter Mountain (12,324 ft (3,760 m)) is in Shoshone National Forest in the U.S. state of Wyoming. Carter Mountain slopes gently up from the Bighorn Basin to the east but has steep cliffs on its western face. The region is well known for large herds of bighorn sheep, pronghorn and elk.

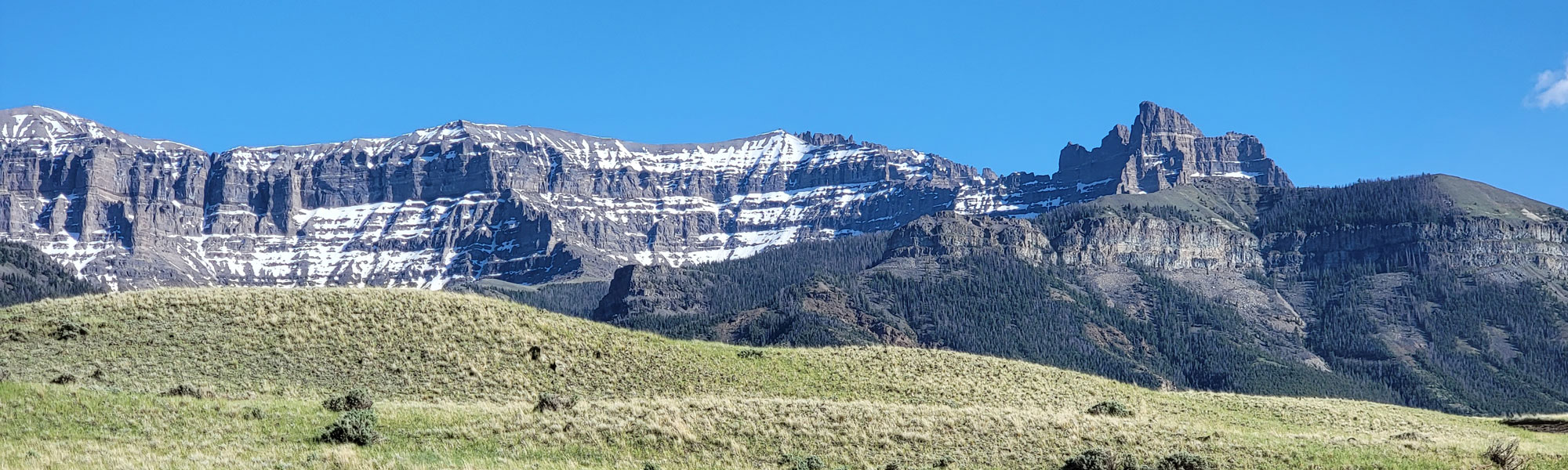
Carter Mountain, west aspect

== Climate ==
Climate data for Carter Mountain 44.1939 N, 109.4176 W, Elevation: 11,913 ft (3,631 m) (1991–2020 normals)
Month	Jan	Feb	Mar	Apr	May	Jun	Jul	Aug	Sep	Oct	Nov	Dec	Year
Mean daily maximum °F (°C)	19.1 (−7.2)	18.4 (−7.6)	23.4 (−4.8)	29.1 (−1.6)	38.3 (3.5)	48.5 (9.2)	58.7 (14.8)	57.8 (14.3)	48.9 (9.4)	36.2 (2.3)	24.4 (−4.2)	18.4 (−7.6)	35.1 (1.7)
Daily mean °F (°C)	9.8 (−12.3)	8.2 (−13.2)	12.6 (−10.8)	17.5 (−8.1)	26.2 (−3.2)	35.7 (2.1)	44.8 (7.1)	44.1 (6.7)	35.9 (2.2)	24.7 (−4.1)	15.2 (−9.3)	9.4 (−12.6)	23.7 (−4.6)
Mean daily minimum °F (°C)	0.5 (−17.5)	−1.9 (−18.8)	1.9 (−16.7)	5.8 (−14.6)	14.1 (−9.9)	22.9 (−5.1)	30.9 (−0.6)	30.3 (−0.9)	22.8 (−5.1)	13.2 (−10.4)	6.0 (−14.4)	0.4 (−17.6)	12.2 (−11.0)
Average precipitation inches (mm)	1.61 (41)	1.65 (42)	2.82 (72)	4.23 (107)	5.69 (145)	3.32 (84)	1.92 (49)	1.73 (44)	2.72 (69)	2.98 (76)	2.21 (56)	2.03 (52)	32.91 (837)
Source: PRISM Climate Group
