= Wyoming Peak =

Mountain in Wyoming, United States

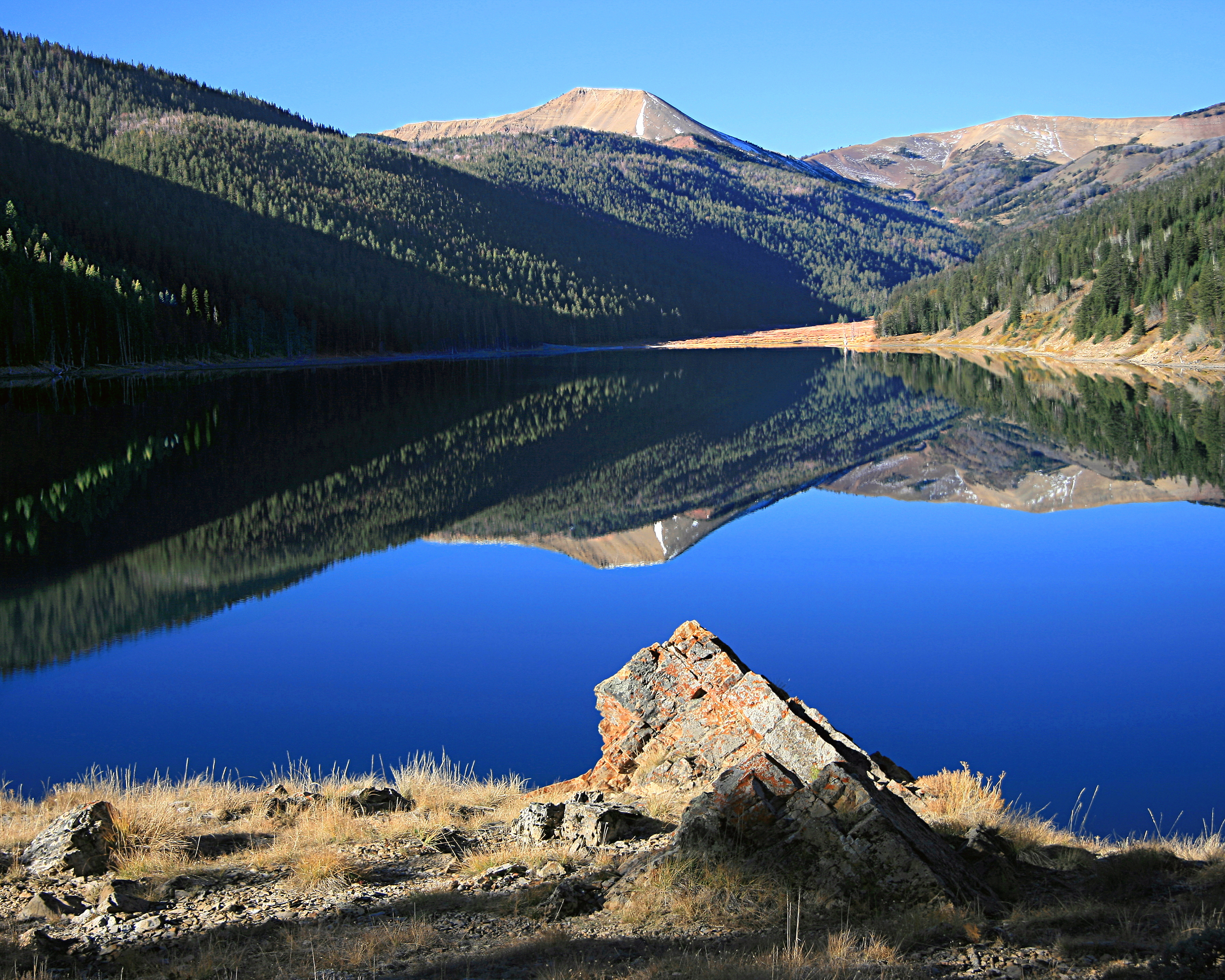
- Wyoming Peak (center background) from Middle Piney Lake, with Mount Coffin at right

Highest point
- Elevation: 11,383 ft (3,470 m)
- Prominence: 3,538 ft (1,078 m)
- Coordinates: 42°36′16″N 110°37′28″W

Geography
- Location within Wyoming Location within the United States
- Location: Lincoln County, Wyoming, U.S.
- Parent range: Wyoming Range
- Topo map: USGS Wyoming Peak

Climbing
- Easiest route: Hike

Wyoming Peak (11,383 feet (3,470 m)) is the tallest mountain in the Wyoming Range in the U.S. state of Wyoming. Situated in Bridger-Teton National Forest, a now collapsed fire lookout is located on the summit. Wyoming Peak is .75 miles (1.21 km) south-southeast of Coffin Peak, the second highest peak in the Wyoming Range.

== Climate ==
There is no weather station at the summit, but this climate table contains interpolated data for an area around the summit. Wyoming Peak has a (subalpine climate (Köppen Dfc).

Climate data for Wyoming Peak 42.6185 N, 110.6250 W, Elevation: 10,925 ft (3,330 m) (1991–2020 normals)
Month	Jan	Feb	Mar	Apr	May	Jun	Jul	Aug	Sep	Oct	Nov	Dec	Year
Mean daily maximum °F (°C)	23.9 (−4.5)	23.7 (−4.6)	29.3 (−1.5)	34.6 (1.4)	43.9 (6.6)	55.0 (12.8)	65.1 (18.4)	63.6 (17.6)	54.0 (12.2)	40.6 (4.8)	29.7 (−1.3)	23.2 (−4.9)	40.6 (4.8)
Daily mean °F (°C)	14.5 (−9.7)	13.5 (−10.3)	18.4 (−7.6)	23.3 (−4.8)	32.3 (0.2)	42.6 (5.9)	51.6 (10.9)	50.5 (10.3)	41.7 (5.4)	29.9 (−1.2)	20.3 (−6.5)	14.1 (−9.9)	29.4 (−1.4)
Mean daily minimum °F (°C)	5.0 (−15.0)	3.2 (−16.0)	7.6 (−13.6)	11.9 (−11.2)	20.7 (−6.3)	30.2 (−1.0)	38.2 (3.4)	37.3 (2.9)	29.3 (−1.5)	19.3 (−7.1)	11.0 (−11.7)	5.0 (−15.0)	18.2 (−7.7)
Average precipitation inches (mm)	6.31 (160)	5.64 (143)	4.61 (117)	4.19 (106)	3.69 (94)	2.38 (60)	1.49 (38)	1.49 (38)	2.16 (55)	2.97 (75)	4.86 (123)	5.84 (148)	45.63 (1,157)
Source: PRISM Climate Group
