= Ferris Mountains =

Small Wyoming mountain range

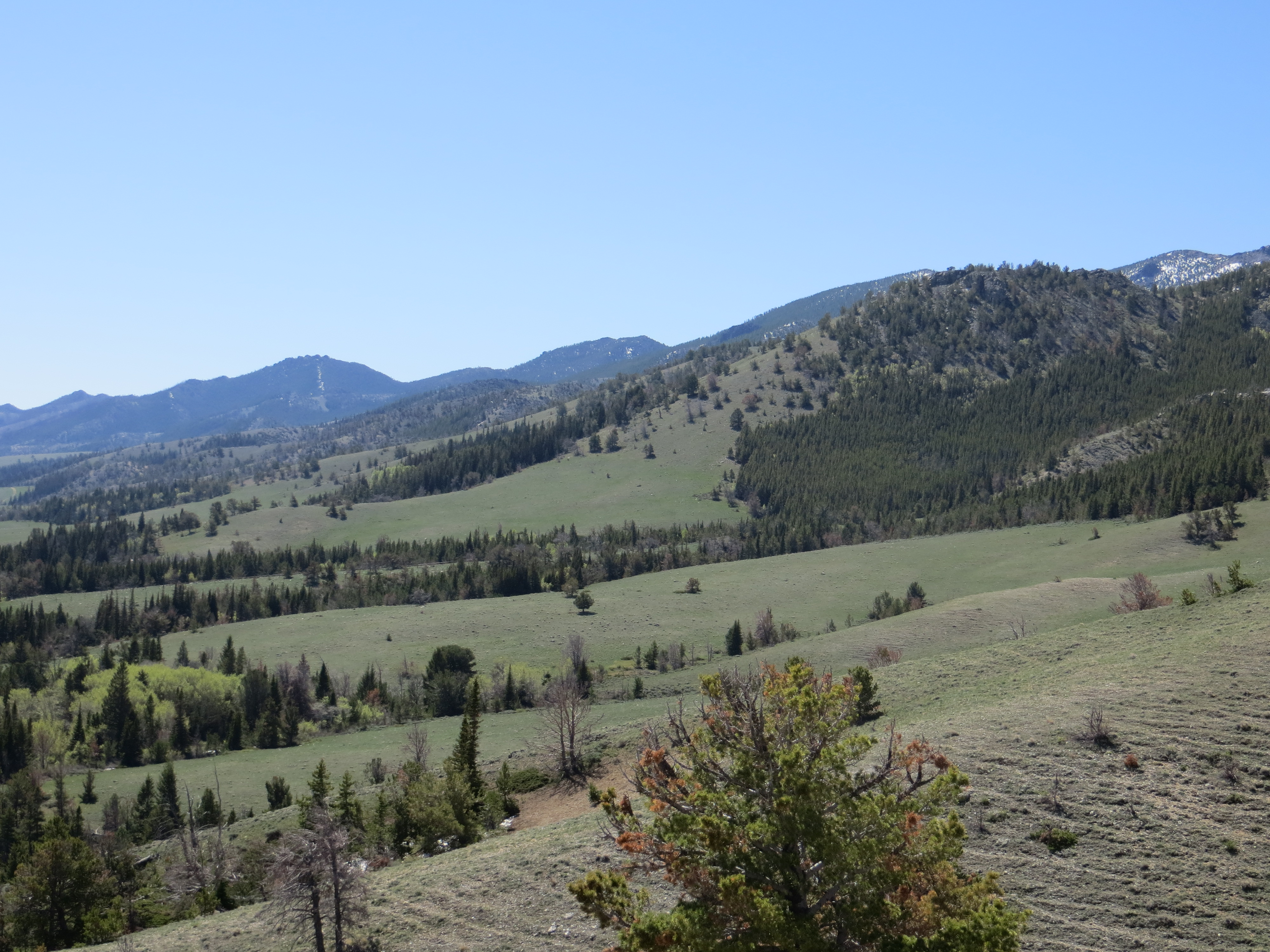
- North face of Ferris Mountains

Highest point
- Peak: Ferris Peak
- Elevation: 10,037 ft (3,059 m)
- Coordinates: 42°15′25″N 107°14′22″W

Geography
- Location within Wyoming
- Country: United States
- State: Wyoming

The Ferris Mountains are a small mountain range in Carbon County, Wyoming. A high white cliff undulates along the entire length of the south side of the range, making it uniquely noticeable. The cliff is predominantly visible from U.S. Route 287. The highest peak in the range is Ferris Peak, which rises to an elevation of 10,037 feet (3,059 m). Ferris peak stands 3,000 feet (910 m) above the surrounding valley, and is the highest peak in the Great Divide Basin.

Most of the range is covered by a BLM Wilderness Study Area.

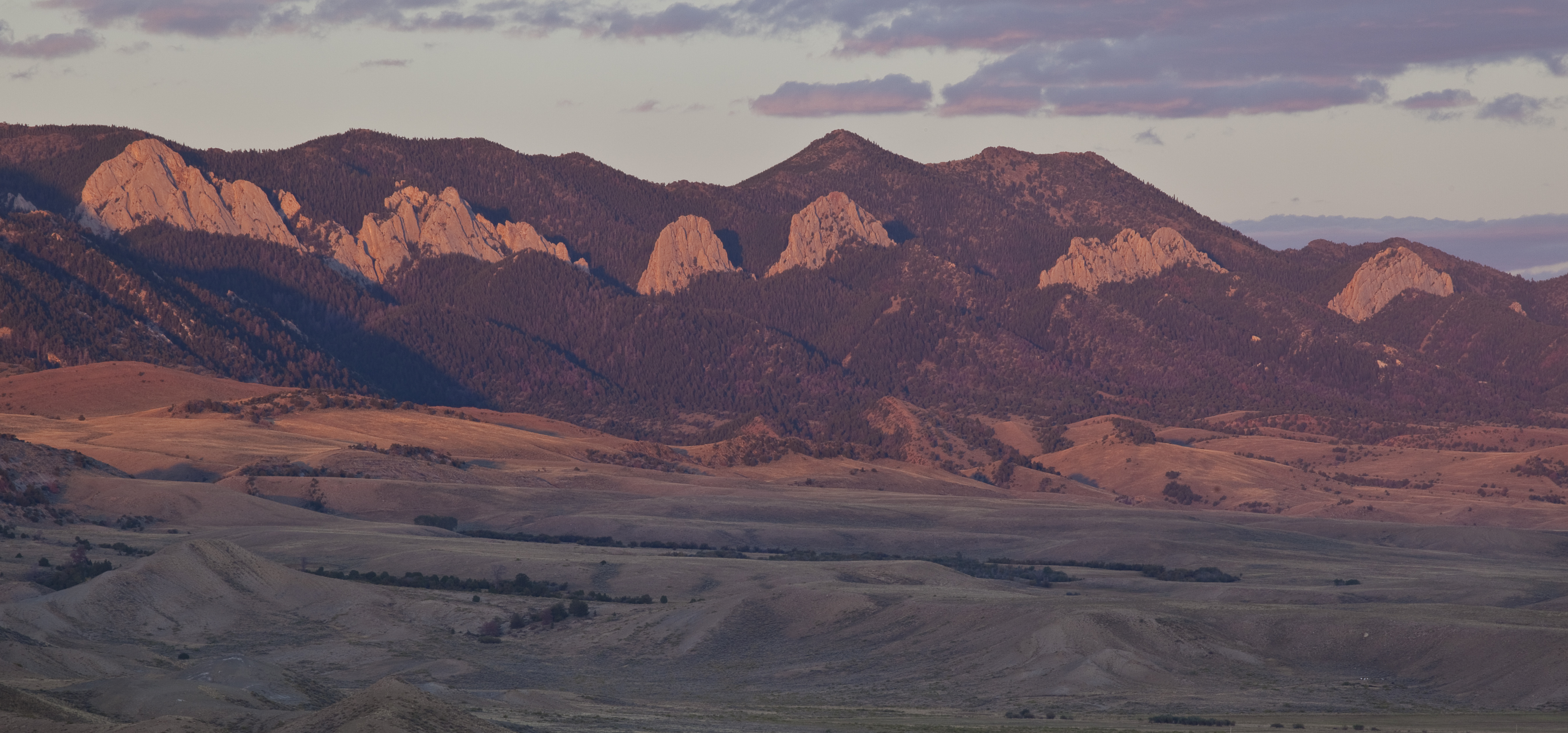
Ferris Mountains limestone cliffs.

== See also ==
- List of mountain ranges in Wyoming
