= The Thunderer (Wyoming) =

Mountain in Wyoming, United States

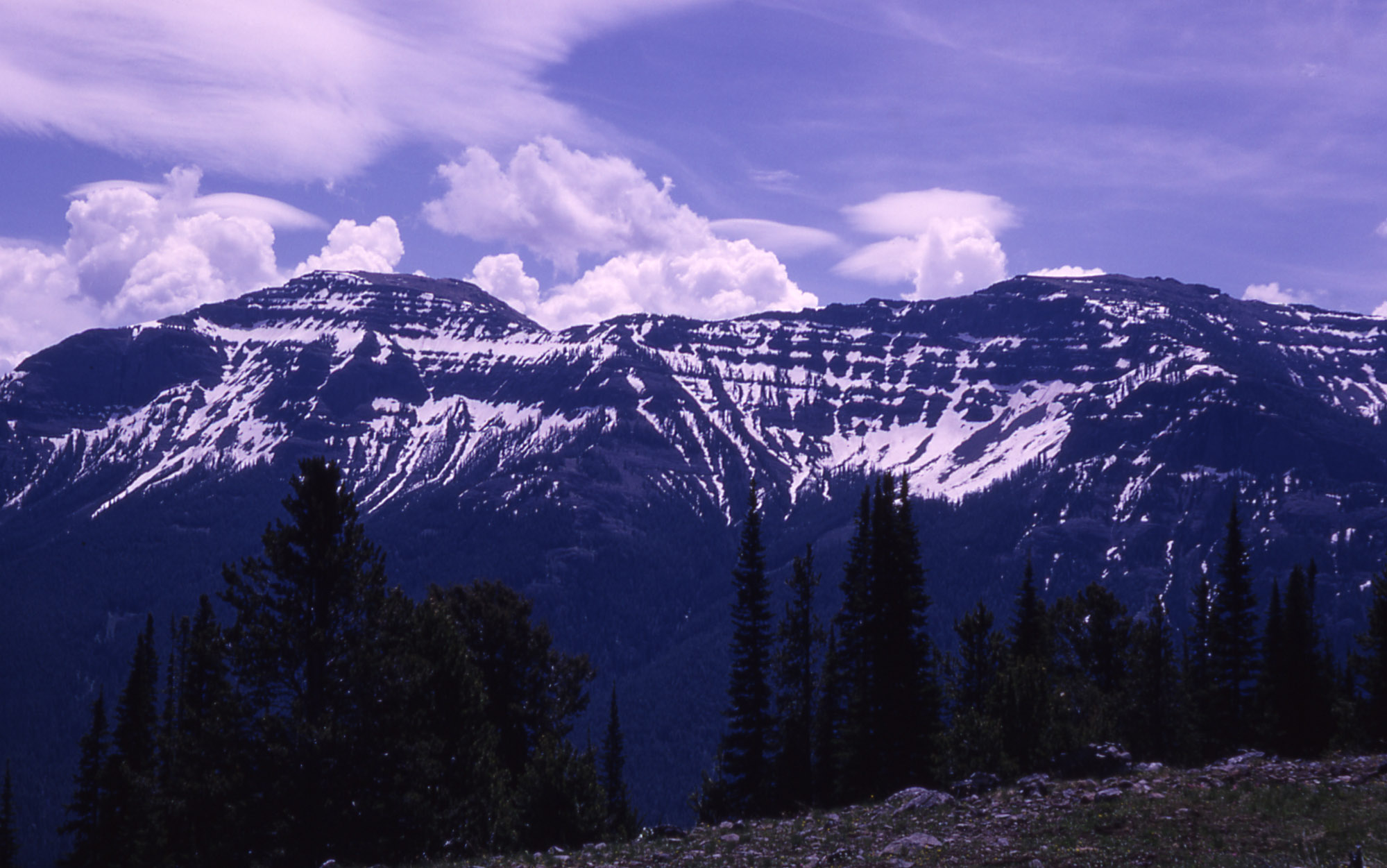
- From Soda Butte

Highest point
- Elevation: 10,558 ft (3,218 m)
- Prominence: 1714
- Coordinates: 44°54′12″N 110°03′24″W

Geography
- Location: Yellowstone National Park, Park County, Wyoming, US
- Parent range: Absaroka Range
- Topo map: Abiathar Peak

The Thunderer el. 10,558 feet (3,218 m) is a mountain peak in the northeast section of Yellowstone National Park, in the Absaroka Range of the U.S. state of Wyoming. Named by members of the Arnold Hague Geological Survey of 1885 for its propensity to attract thunderstorms, the mountain is a long high ridge just north of Mount Norris. Prior to 1885, the peak was merely considered a high ridge extending north from Mount Norris rather than a separately named peak. The Thunderer is easily visible from the northeast entrance road as it passes up the Soda Butte Creek canyon.

The north end of the ridge can be reached via the 7.4 miles (11.9 km) Thunderer Cutoff Trail. The trailhead is located just opposite the Pebble Creek Campground on the northeast entrance road. This trail passes through Chaw Pass to connect with the Cache Creek trail which parallels the southeast face of The Thunderer ridge.

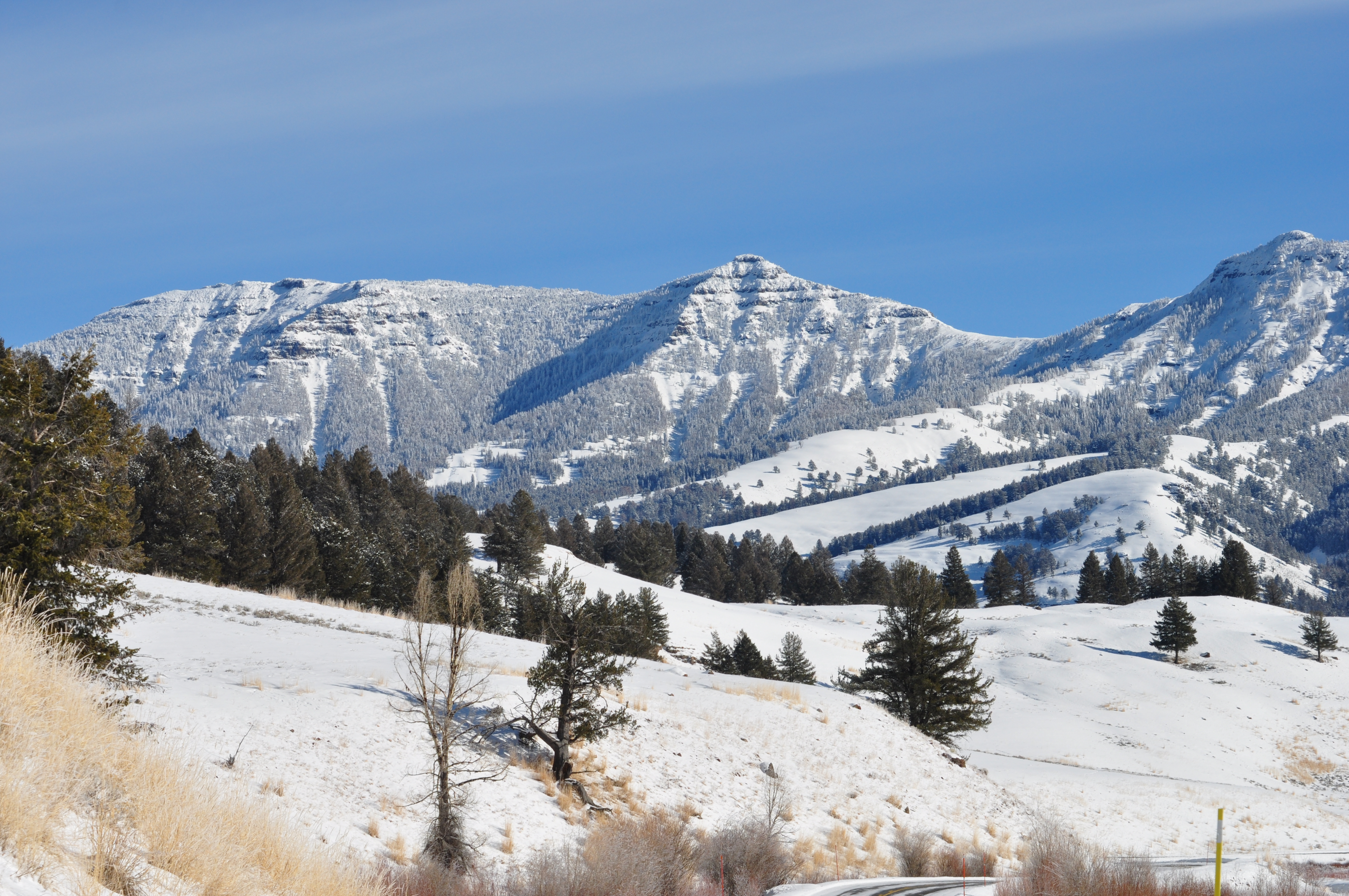
The Thunderer at left Mount Norris at right

== See also ==
- Mountains and mountain ranges of Yellowstone National Park
