= Rendezvous Peak =

Mountain in the state of Wyoming

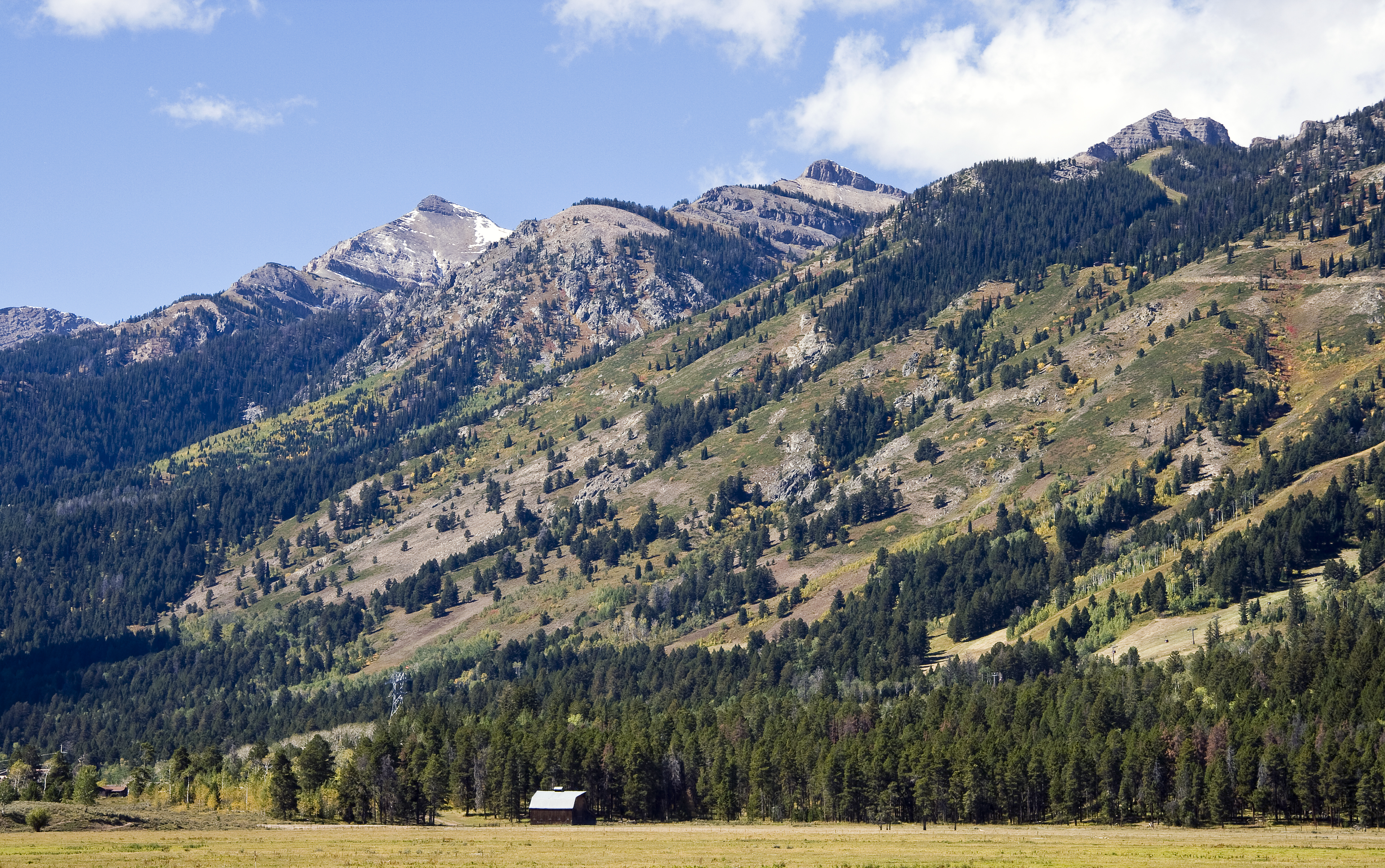
- Rendezvous Peak at far left is the highest point on Rendezvous Mountain

Highest point
- Elevation: 10,932 ft (3,332 m)
- Prominence: 1,842 ft (561 m)
- Coordinates: 43°34′03″N 110°54′17″W

Geography
- Location within Wyoming Location within the United States
- Location: Teton County, Wyoming, U.S.
- Parent range: Teton Range
- Topo map: USGS Rendezvous Peak

Rendezvous Peak (10,932 feet (3,332 m)) is in the Teton Range in the U.S. state of Wyoming. Situated just south of Grand Teton National Park and within Bridger-Teton National Forest, Rendezvous Peak is the highest point on Rendezvous Mountain.
