= Hoback Peak =

Highest point
- Elevation: 10,867 ft (3,312 m)
- Prominence: 2,546 ft (776 m)
- Coordinates: 43.08449°N 110.57040°W

Geography
- Location: Sublette County, Wyoming, U.S.
- Parent range: Wyoming Range
- Topo map: USGS Hoback Peak

Climbing
- Easiest route: Hiking/Scrambling

Hoback Peak is a 10,867 feet (3,312 m) mountain summit located in the Wyoming Range in Sublette County, Wyoming. It is located within the Bridger-Teton National Forest. The mountain has a topographic prominence of 2,546 feet (776 m). The peak was named in honor of John Hoback, a trapper who traveled through the region with the Missouri Fur Company. The most common approach to hike the mountain is Kilgore Creek Trail, which begins off US-189/191 and leads toward the northeast ridge.

The peak is located within the Idaho-Wyoming-Utah overthrust Belt, which is characterized by technonic shortening during the Laramide orogeny. The mountain is largely composed of sedimentary rocks from the Mesozoic and Paleozoic eras. The summit area features resistant layers of the Nugget Sandstone and the Ankareh Formation. The mountain lies along the Hoback Fault, which forms the eastern portion of the Wyoming Range.
