= Mount Fitzpatrick =

Mountain in Wyoming, United States

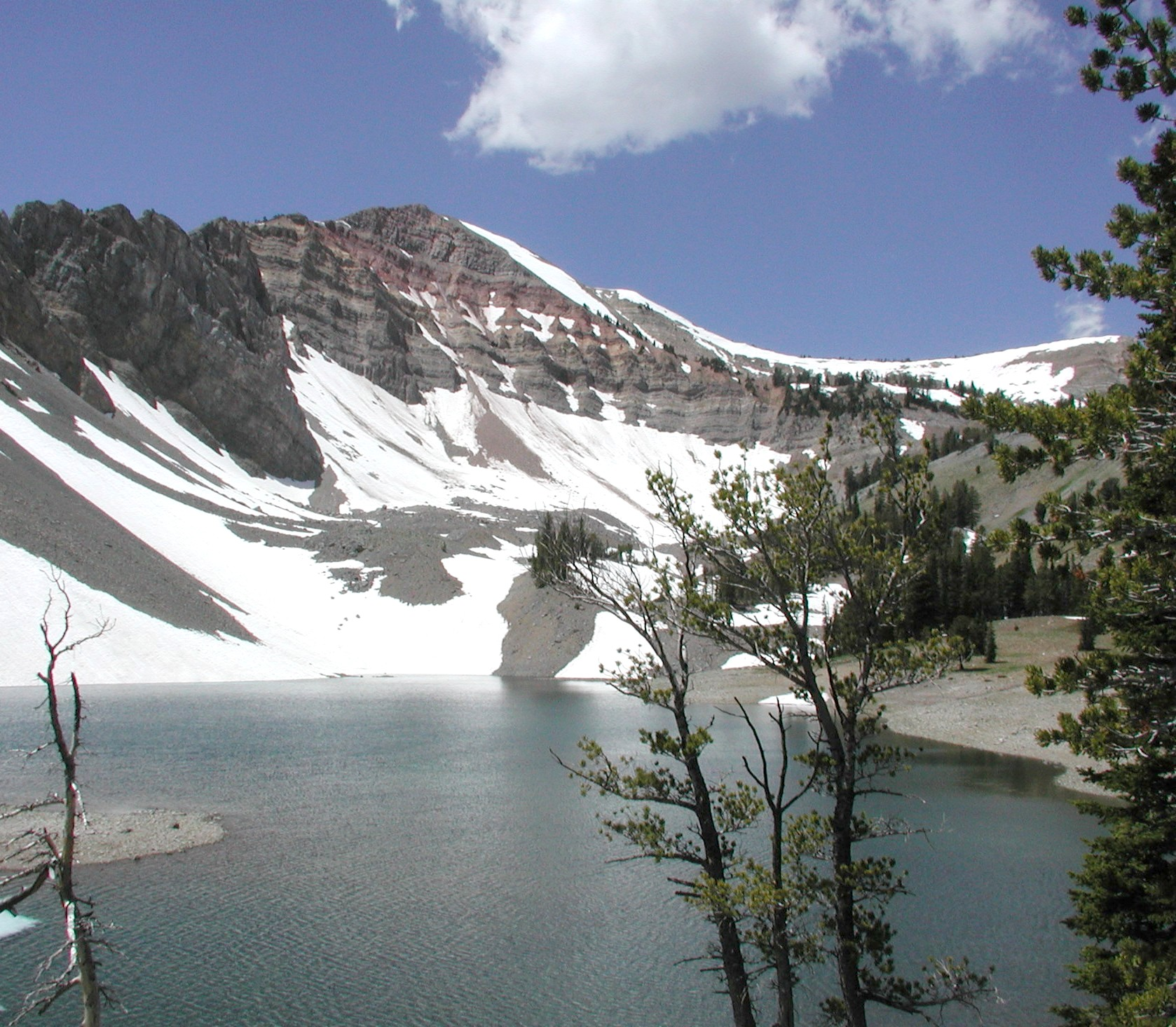
- East aspect, with Upper Crow Creek Lake

Highest point
- Elevation: 10,912 ft (3,326 m)
- Prominence: 2,227 ft (679 m)
- Coordinates: 42°43′34″N 110°46′36″W

Geography
- Location within Wyoming Location within the United States
- Location: Lincoln County, Wyoming, U.S.
- Parent range: Salt River Range
- Topo map: USGS Red Top Mountain

Mount Fitzpatrick (10,912 feet (3,326 m)) is located in the Salt River Range in the U.S. state of Wyoming. The peak is the highest in the Salt River Range.
