= Mount Hancock (Wyoming) =

Mountain in Wyoming, United States

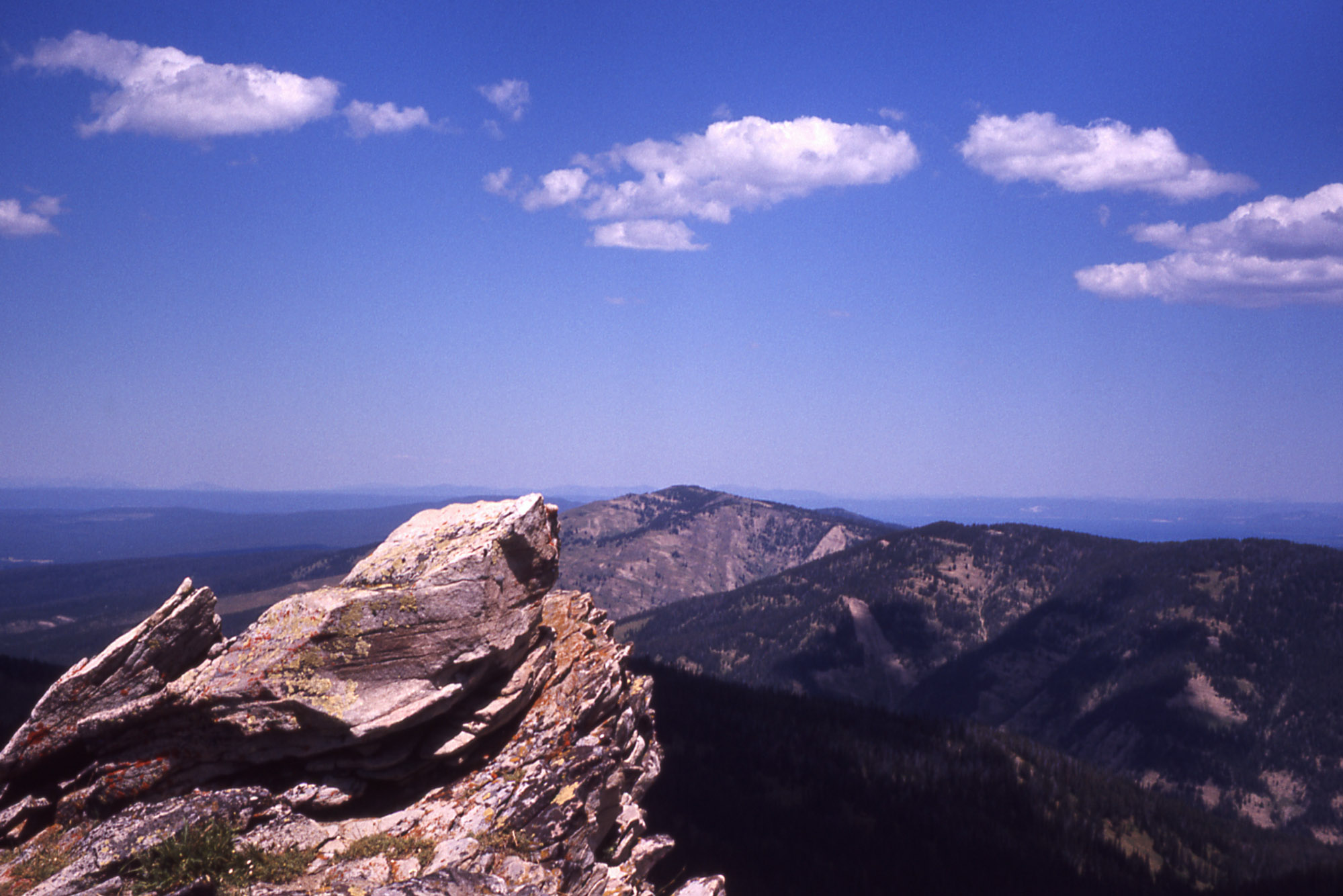
- Looking north from Big Game Ridge, 1971

Highest point
- Elevation: 10,223 ft (3,116 m)
- Coordinates: 44°09′19″N 110°25′03″W

Geography
- Location within Wyoming
- Location: Yellowstone National Park, Teton County, Wyoming
- Parent range: Big Game Ridge
- Topo map: Mount Hancock

Mount Hancock el. 10,223 feet (3,116 m) is an isolated mountain peak on Big Game Ridge in Yellowstone National Park. Captain John W. Barlow named the peak in honor of General Winfield Scott Hancock during the Barlow-Heap Exploration of Yellowstone in 1871. General Hancock is noted for issuing the orders that established the military escort led by Lt. Gustavus Cheyney Doane for the Washburn–Langford–Doane Expedition of 1870.

Big Game Ridge is a precipitous north-south ridge due south of Heart Lake on the park's southern border. Mount Hancock anchors the southern part of the ridge and is approximately 1.5 miles (2.4 km) southwest of the Snake River trail.

== See also ==
- Mountains and mountain ranges of Yellowstone National Park
