= Bushnell Peak =

Mountain in the American state of Colorado

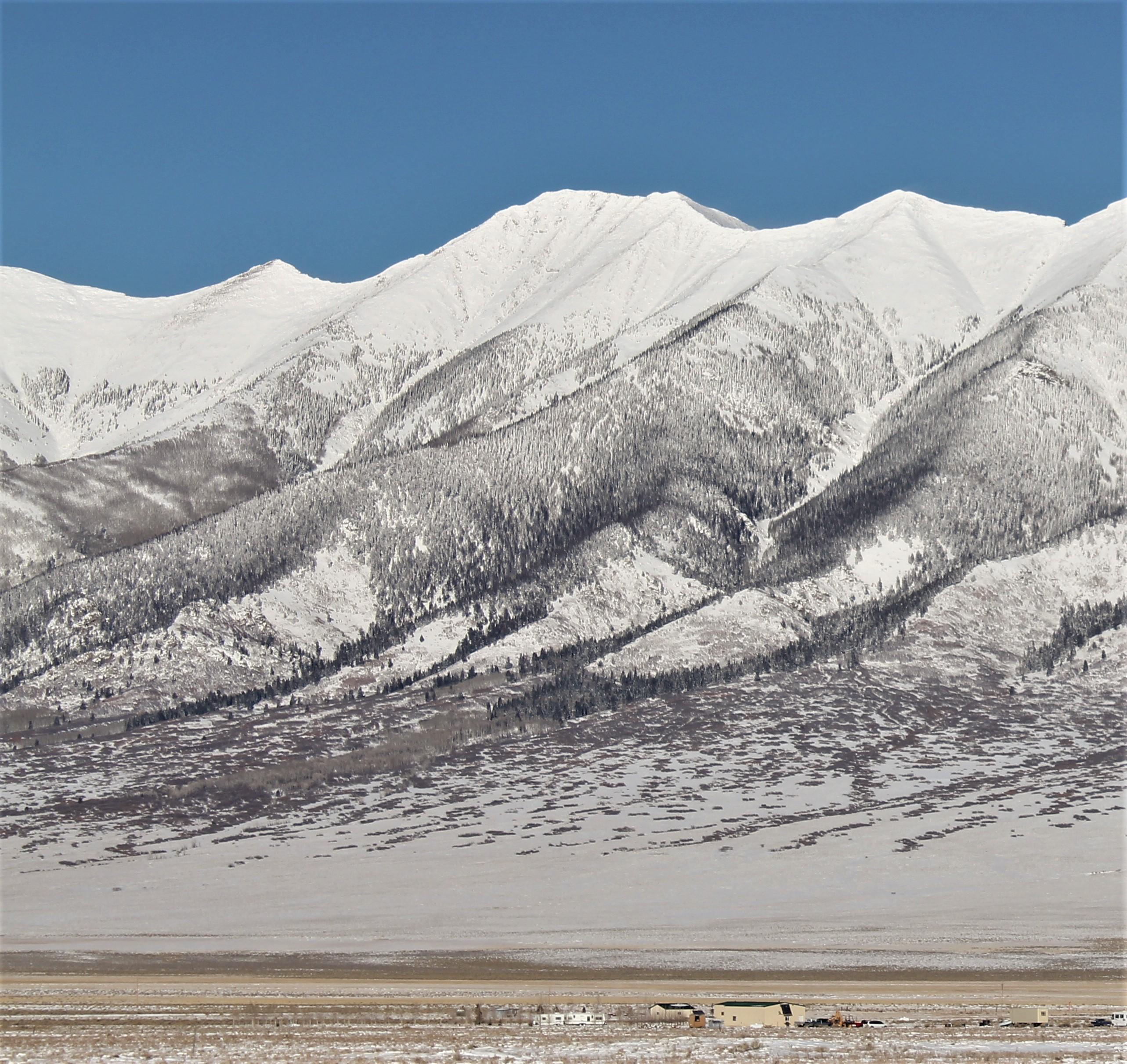
- Southwest aspect, from Highway 285

Highest point
- Elevation: 13,110 ft (3,996 m)
- Prominence: 2,405 ft (733 m)
- Parent peak: Cottonwood Peak (13,588 ft)
- Isolation: 11.07 mi (17.82 km)
- Listing: Colorado county high points 31st
- Coordinates: 38°20′28″N 105°53′21″W

Geography
- Location within Colorado
- Location: Saguache County and the high point of Fremont County, Colorado, United States
- Parent range: Sangre de Cristo Range
- Topo map(s): USGS 7.5' topographic map Bushnell Peak, Colorado

Climbing
- Easiest route: hike

Bushnell Peak is a prominent mountain summit in the Sangre de Cristo Range of the Rocky Mountains of North America. The 13,110-foot (3,996 m) thirteener is located 7.2 miles (11.6 km) north-northeast (bearing 27°) of the community of Villa Grove, Colorado, United States, on the drainage divide separating Rio Grande National Forest and Saguache County from San Isabel National Forest and Fremont County. Bushnell Peak is the highest point in Fremont County.

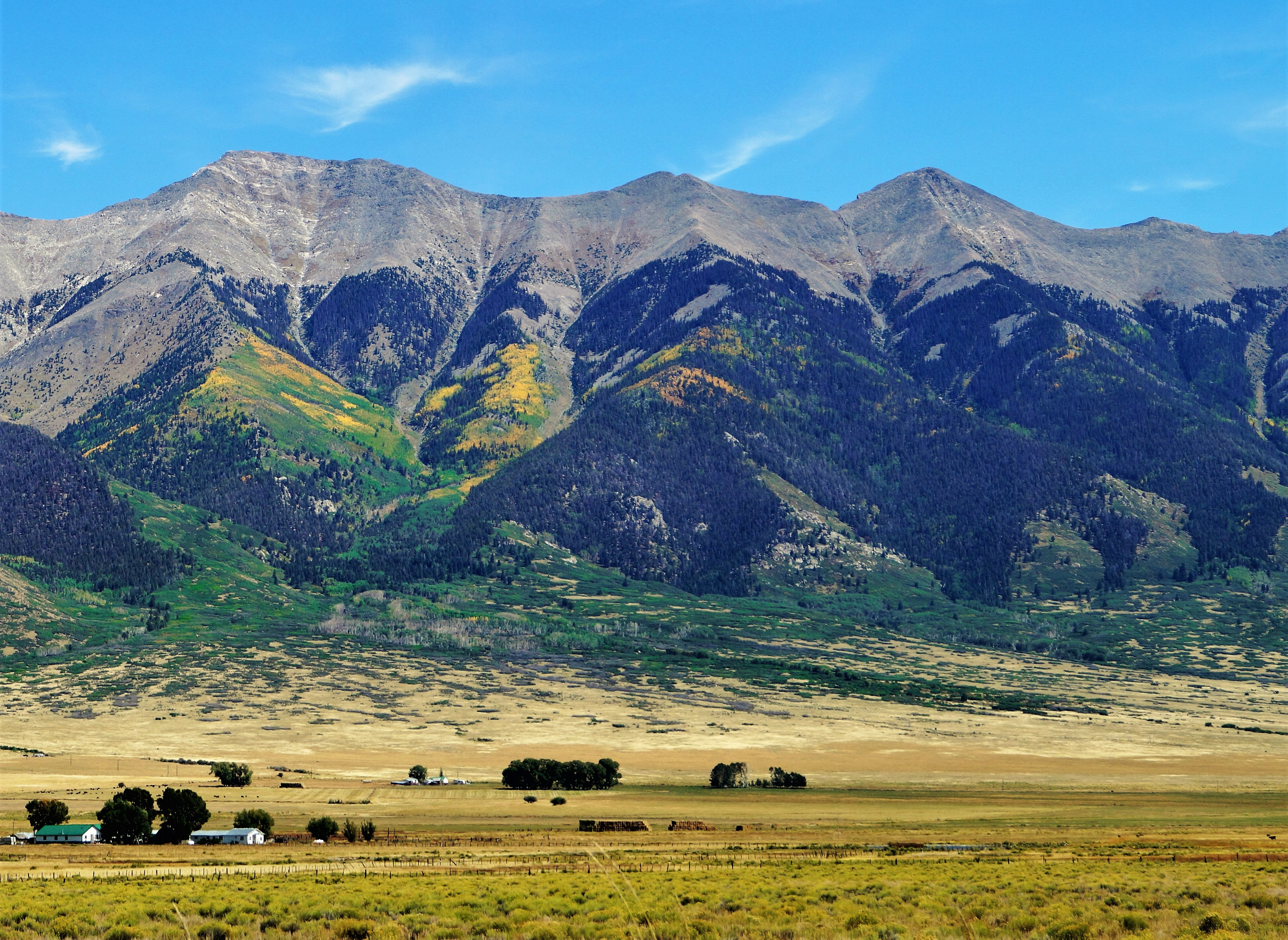
Bushnell Peak (left) and Mt. Otto (right)

== See also ==
- List of mountain peaks of Colorado
  - List of the most prominent summits of Colorado
  - List of Colorado county high points
