= Blanca Peak =

Mountain in Colorado, United States

- Sis Naajinį́ (Navajo)
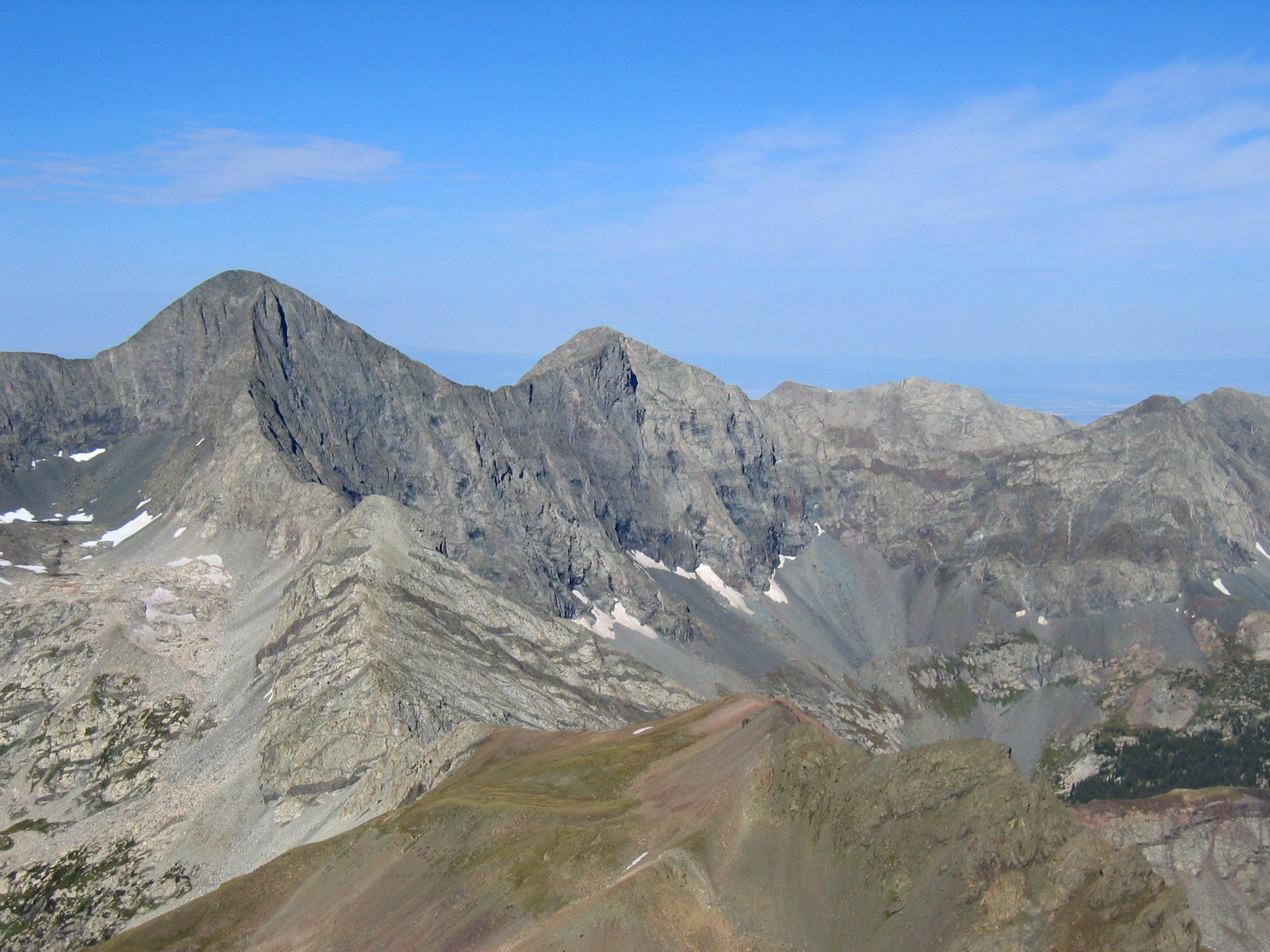
- View of Blanca Peak (left of center) from Mt. Lindsey

Highest point
- Elevation: 14,351 ft (4,374 m); NAVD88
- Prominence: 5326 ft (1623 m)
- Isolation: 103.4 mi (166.4 km)
- Listing: North America highest peaks 33rd; US highest major peaks 19th; US most prominent peaks 103rd; US most isolated peaks 49th; Colorado highest major peaks 4th; Colorado fourteeners 4th; Colorado county high points 3rd
- Coordinates: 37°34′38″N 105°29′09″W

Geography
- Location within Colorado
- Location: High point of both Alamosa and Costilla counties, Colorado, US
- Parent range: Highest summit of the Sangre de Cristo Mountains, Sangre de Cristo Range, and Sierra Blanca Massif
- Topo map(s): USGS 7.5' topographic map Blanca Peak, Colorado

Climbing
- First ascent: August 14, 1874 by the Wheeler Survey (first recorded)
- Easiest route: Northwest Face/North Ridge: Scramble (class 2)

Blanca Peak Tripoint

Highest point
- Elevation: 14,326 ft (4,367 m) (Note: The elevation of the Blanca Peak Tripoint includes an adjustment of +1.755 m (+5.76 ft) from NGVD 29 to NAVD 88.)
- Parent peak: Blanca Peak
- Listing: Colorado county high points
- Coordinates: 37°34′40″N 105°29′07″W

Geography
- Location: Tripoint of Alamosa, Costilla, and Huerfano counties, Colorado, US High point of Huerfano County.

Blanca Peak (Navajo: Sis Naajinį́, 'black belted mountain'; Ute: Peeroradarath; Tewa: Pʼin Tsʼą̈ˀi, lit. 'white mountain') is the fourth highest summit of the Rocky Mountains of North America and the U.S. state of Colorado. The ultra-prominent 14,351-foot (4,374 m) peak is the highest summit of the Sierra Blanca Massif, the Sangre de Cristo Range, and the Sangre de Cristo Mountains. The fourteener is located 9.6 miles (15.5 km) north by east (bearing 9°) of the Town of Blanca, on the drainage divide separating Rio Grande National Forest and Alamosa County from the Sangre de Cristo Land Grant and Costilla County. The summit is the highest point of both counties and the entire drainage basin of the Rio Grande. Below the steep North Face of Blanca Peak two live Glaciers once developed, until extinction sometime after 1903. North & South Blanca Glaciers were located at 37° 35N., longitude 105° 28W. Blanca Peak is higher than any point in the United States east of its longitude. (Note: The elevation of Blanca Peak includes an adjustment of +1.754 m (+5.75 ft) from NGVD 29 to NAVD 88.)

The Blanca Peak Tripoint of Alamosa, Costilla, and Huerfano counties is located on the same drainage divide approximately 251 feet (77 m) northeast by north (bearing 30°) of the Blanca Peak summit at the boundary of the San Isabel National Forest. The Blanca Peak Tripoint is the highest point in Huerfano County.

== Geography ==
Blanca Peak is located at the southern end of the Sangre de Cristo Range, a subrange of the more extensive Sangre de Cristo Mountains, and is the highest peak in both ranges. It lies approximately 20 miles (32 km) east-northeast of the town of Alamosa. Approximately 15 miles (24 km) to the north-northwest is Great Sand Dunes National Park and Preserve.

Blanca Peak is notable not only for its absolute height, but also for its great local relief and dominant position at the end of the range, rising high above the San Luis Valley to the west. For example, it rises nearly 7,000 feet (2,100 m) over the edge of the San Luis Valley in only 6 miles (9.7 km). Blanca is also the third most topographically prominent peak in Colorado; it is separated from the higher peaks in the Sawatch Range by relatively low Poncha Pass at 9,019 feet (2,749 m).

Blanca Peak heads up three major creeks. Holbrook Creek is on the west, flowing from a basin including Crater Lake, Blue Lakes, and Como Lake. There is a class 2 route to the summit from Como Lake.

An extremely challenging four wheel drive road accesses Como Lake 11,750 feet (3,580 m), and provides the most frequently used access to Blanca Peak. Most vehicles stop at an elevation of between 8,000 feet (2,400 m) and 10,000 feet (3,000 m) on this road. The Como Lake Road is a designated Alamosa County Road and runs to the edge of the Sangre de Cristo Wilderness just short of Blue Lakes. The Como Lake Road is rated as the most challenging 4WD road in Colorado. The Huerfano River flows from the north side of Blanca Peak. A road, starting out as a two-wheel drive road, then becoming a four-wheel drive road (less challenging than the Como Lake Road), provides access to the technical climbing on the North Face of Blanca Peak. Blanca Creek drains Blanca Basin under the south slopes of the peak, and Little Ute Creek descends from the Winchell Lakes on the southeast side. However these are not used to access the peak due to private property.

Three other fourteeners are nearby: Mount Lindsey to the east, Ellingwood Point to the north and Little Bear Peak to the southwest. Ellingwood Point is connected to Blanca by a short, high ridge, and is often climbed in conjunction with Blanca. Little Bear also has a high connecting ridge to Blanca, but it is a technical traverse, only recommended for highly experienced parties.

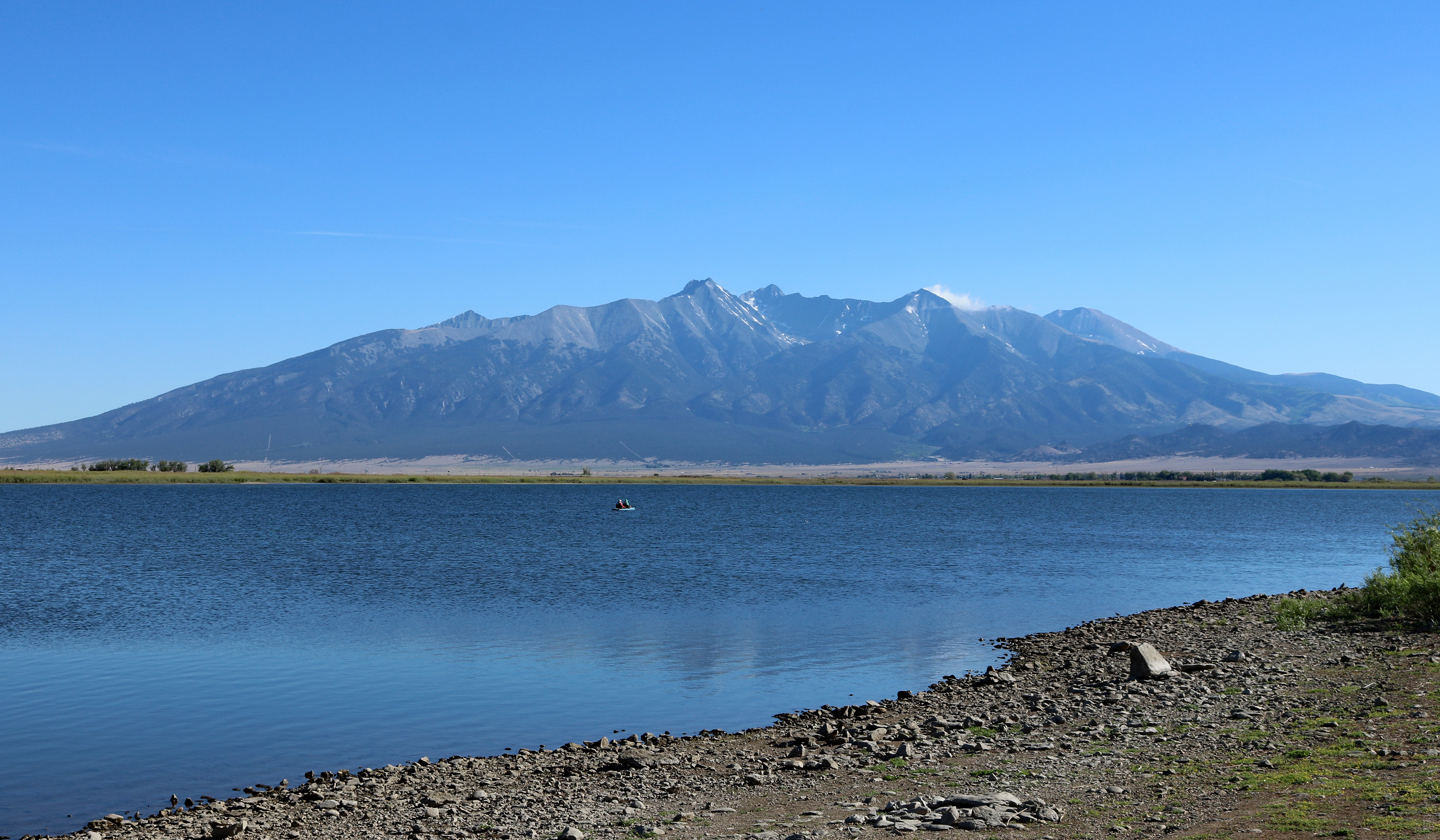
The peak viewed from Smith Reservoir, south of Blanca

=== Climate ===
Climate data for Blanca Peak 37.5747 N, 105.4827 W, Elevation: 13,478 ft (4,108 m) (1991–2020 normals)
Month	Jan	Feb	Mar	Apr	May	Jun	Jul	Aug	Sep	Oct	Nov	Dec	Year
Mean daily maximum °F (°C)	24.1 (−4.4)	23.8 (−4.6)	28.6 (−1.9)	34.2 (1.2)	42.8 (6.0)	54.3 (12.4)	58.5 (14.7)	56.3 (13.5)	50.8 (10.4)	41.1 (5.1)	30.9 (−0.6)	24.7 (−4.1)	39.2 (4.0)
Daily mean °F (°C)	12.1 (−11.1)	11.5 (−11.4)	15.8 (−9.0)	20.9 (−6.2)	29.5 (−1.4)	39.8 (4.3)	44.4 (6.9)	42.9 (6.1)	37.5 (3.1)	28.3 (−2.1)	19.4 (−7.0)	13.0 (−10.6)	26.3 (−3.2)
Mean daily minimum °F (°C)	0.1 (−17.7)	−0.8 (−18.2)	3.0 (−16.1)	7.6 (−13.6)	16.2 (−8.8)	25.4 (−3.7)	30.3 (−0.9)	29.6 (−1.3)	24.1 (−4.4)	15.5 (−9.2)	7.9 (−13.4)	1.3 (−17.1)	13.4 (−10.4)
Average precipitation inches (mm)	2.23 (57)	2.38 (60)	3.72 (94)	3.81 (97)	2.87 (73)	1.63 (41)	4.40 (112)	3.72 (94)	2.52 (64)	2.48 (63)	2.37 (60)	2.44 (62)	34.57 (877)
Source: PRISM Climate Group

== Geology ==
The granite that makes up the Blanca massif is pre-Cambrian in age, dated at approximately 1.8 billion years old. The major part of the Wet Mountains to the east and the Front Range to the northeast are also pre-Cambrian, also about 1.8 billion years old. In contrast, the Sangre de Cristo Range to the north and the Culebra Range to the south are Permian rock between 250 and 300 million years old.

== History ==
Blanca Peak is known to the Navajo people as the Sacred Mountain of the East: Sisnaajiní (or Tsisnaasjiní), the Dawn or White Shell Mountain. The mountain is considered to be the eastern boundary of the Dinetah, the traditional Navajo homeland. It is associated with the color white, and is said to be covered in daylight and dawn and fastened to the ground with lightning. It is gendered male.

Summitpost notes that "the first recorded ascent of Blanca by the Wheeler Survey was recorded on August 14, 1874, but to their surprise they found evidence of a stone structure possibly built by Ute Indians or wandering Spaniards."

== Historical names ==
- Blanca Peak
- Dziłnałjin (Jicarilla Apache)
- Mount Blanca
- Peeroradarath (Ute)
- Pʼin Tsʼą̈ˀi (Tewa)
- Sierra Blanca Peak
- Sierra Blanca
- Sis Naajinį́ (Navajo)

== See also ==
- List of mountain peaks of North America
  - List of mountain peaks of the United States
    - List of mountain peaks of Colorado
      - List of Colorado county high points
      - List of Colorado fourteeners
- List of Ultras of the United States
