= California Peak =

Mountain in Colorado, United States

- Location within Colorado

Highest point
- Elevation: 13,855 ft (4,223 m)
- Prominence: 629 ft (192 m)
- Isolation: 2.19 mi (3.52 km)
- Coordinates: 37°36′51″N 105°29′55″W

Geography
- Location: Alamosa and Huerfano counties, Colorado, United States
- Parent range: Sangre de Cristo Range, Sierra Blanca Massif
- Topo map(s): USGS 7.5' topographic map Blanca Peak, Colorado

California Peak is a high mountain summit in the Sangre de Cristo Range of the Rocky Mountains of North America. The 13,855-foot (4,223 m) thirteener is located on the Sierra Blanca Massif, 12.1 miles (19.5 km) north (bearing 4°) of the Town of Blanca, Colorado, United States, on the drainage divide separating in Rio Grande National Forest and Alamosa County from San Isabel National Forest and Huerfano County.

== Climate ==
Climate data for California Peak 37.6157 N, 105.5009 W, Elevation: 13,399 ft (4,084 m) (1991–2020 normals)
Month	Jan	Feb	Mar	Apr	May	Jun	Jul	Aug	Sep	Oct	Nov	Dec	Year
Mean daily maximum °F (°C)	24.3 (−4.3)	24.0 (−4.4)	28.8 (−1.8)	34.3 (1.3)	42.9 (6.1)	54.5 (12.5)	58.8 (14.9)	56.6 (13.7)	51.1 (10.6)	41.5 (5.3)	31.2 (−0.4)	24.9 (−3.9)	39.4 (4.1)
Daily mean °F (°C)	12.3 (−10.9)	11.8 (−11.2)	16.1 (−8.8)	21.1 (−6.1)	29.7 (−1.3)	40.1 (4.5)	44.7 (7.1)	43.2 (6.2)	37.8 (3.2)	28.7 (−1.8)	19.7 (−6.8)	13.2 (−10.4)	26.5 (−3.0)
Mean daily minimum °F (°C)	0.3 (−17.6)	−0.5 (−18.1)	3.3 (−15.9)	7.9 (−13.4)	16.6 (−8.6)	25.7 (−3.5)	30.6 (−0.8)	29.9 (−1.2)	24.4 (−4.2)	15.8 (−9.0)	8.2 (−13.2)	1.5 (−16.9)	13.6 (−10.2)
Average precipitation inches (mm)	1.73 (44)	1.74 (44)	3.32 (84)	3.20 (81)	2.58 (66)	1.84 (47)	5.10 (130)	3.92 (100)	2.60 (66)	2.22 (56)	1.73 (44)	1.81 (46)	31.79 (808)
Source: PRISM Climate Group

== See also ==
- List of Colorado mountain ranges
- List of Colorado mountain summits
  - List of Colorado fourteeners
  - List of Colorado 4000 meter prominent summits
  - List of the most prominent summits of Colorado
- List of Colorado county high points
