= Fluted Peak (Colorado) =

Mountain in the state of Colorado

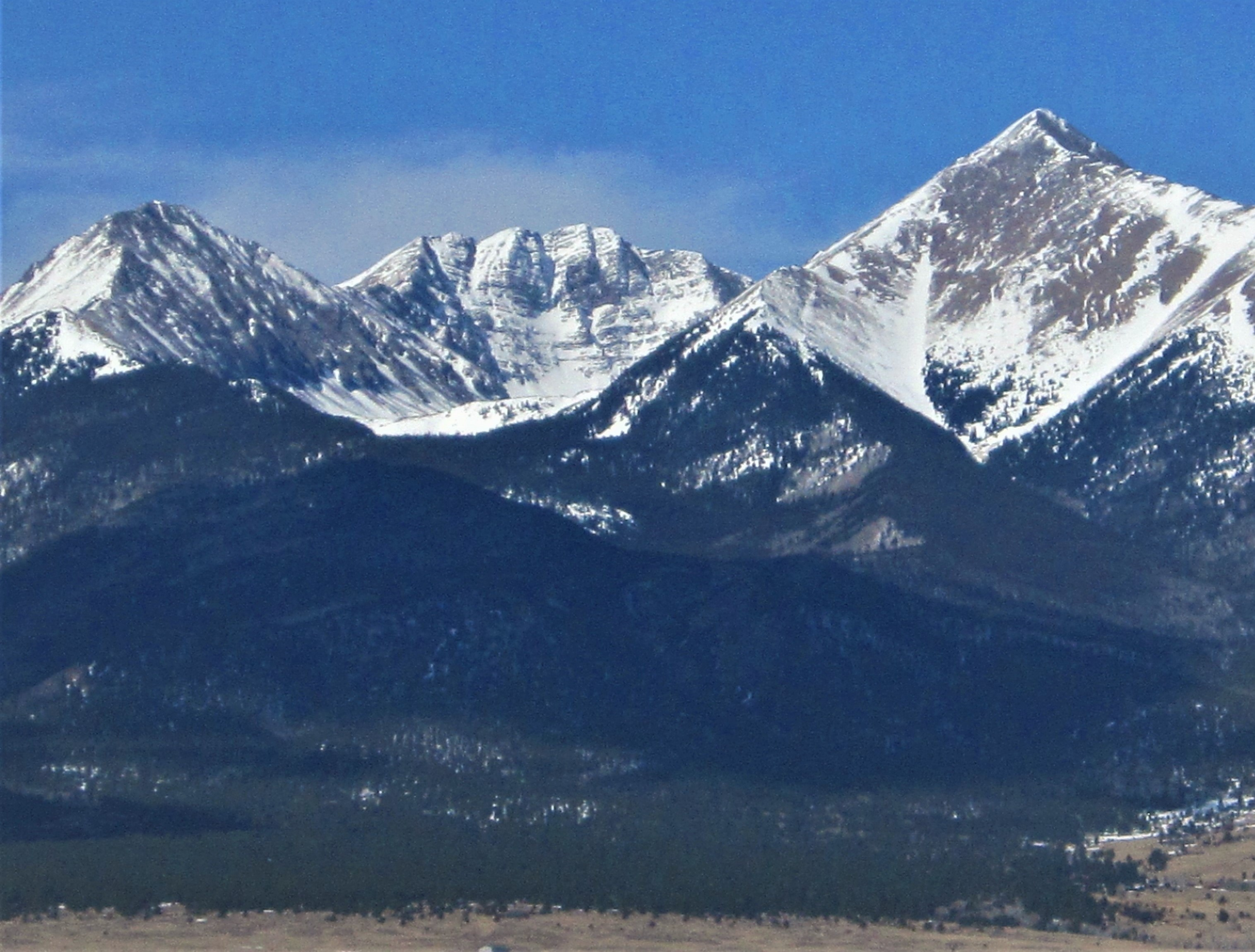
- East aspect of Fluted Peak, centered. (Little Horn Peak to left, Horn Peak to right)

Highest point
- Elevation: 13,554 ft (4,131 m)
- Prominence: 729 ft (222 m)
- Parent peak: Mount Adams (13,937 ft)
- Isolation: 1.19 mi (1.92 km)
- Coordinates: 38°01′28″N 105°36′05″W

Naming
- Etymology: Fluting (geology)

Geography
- Location within Colorado Location within the United States
- Country: United States
- State: Colorado
- County: Custer
- Protected area: Sangre de Cristo Wilderness
- Parent range: Rocky Mountains; Sangre de Cristo Range
- Topo map: USGS Horn Peak

Geology
- Mountain type: Fault block

Climbing
- Easiest route: class 2 hiking

Fluted Peak is a 13,554-foot (4,131 m) mountain summit on the boundary shared by Custer and Saguache counties, in Colorado, United States.

== Description ==
Fluted Peak is set on the crest of the Sangre de Cristo Range which is a subrange of the Rocky Mountains. It is the ninth-highest summit in Custer County and the 205th-highest in Colorado. The mountain is located in the Sangre de Cristo Wilderness on land managed by San Isabel National Forest and Rio Grande National Forest. Precipitation runoff from the mountain's east slopes drains into tributaries of Grape Creek which in turn is a tributary of the Arkansas River, whereas the west slope drains to North Crestone Lake → North Crestone Creek → San Luis Valley. Topographic relief is significant as the east face rises 1,550 feet (472 m) in 0.35 mile (0.56 km) and the summit rises 1,750 feet (533 m) above North Crestone Lake in one-half mile (0.8 km) on the west side of the peak. The mountain's toponym was officially adopted in 1970 by the United States Board on Geographic Names and refers to the alternating ridges and couloirs on the steep east face of the peak.

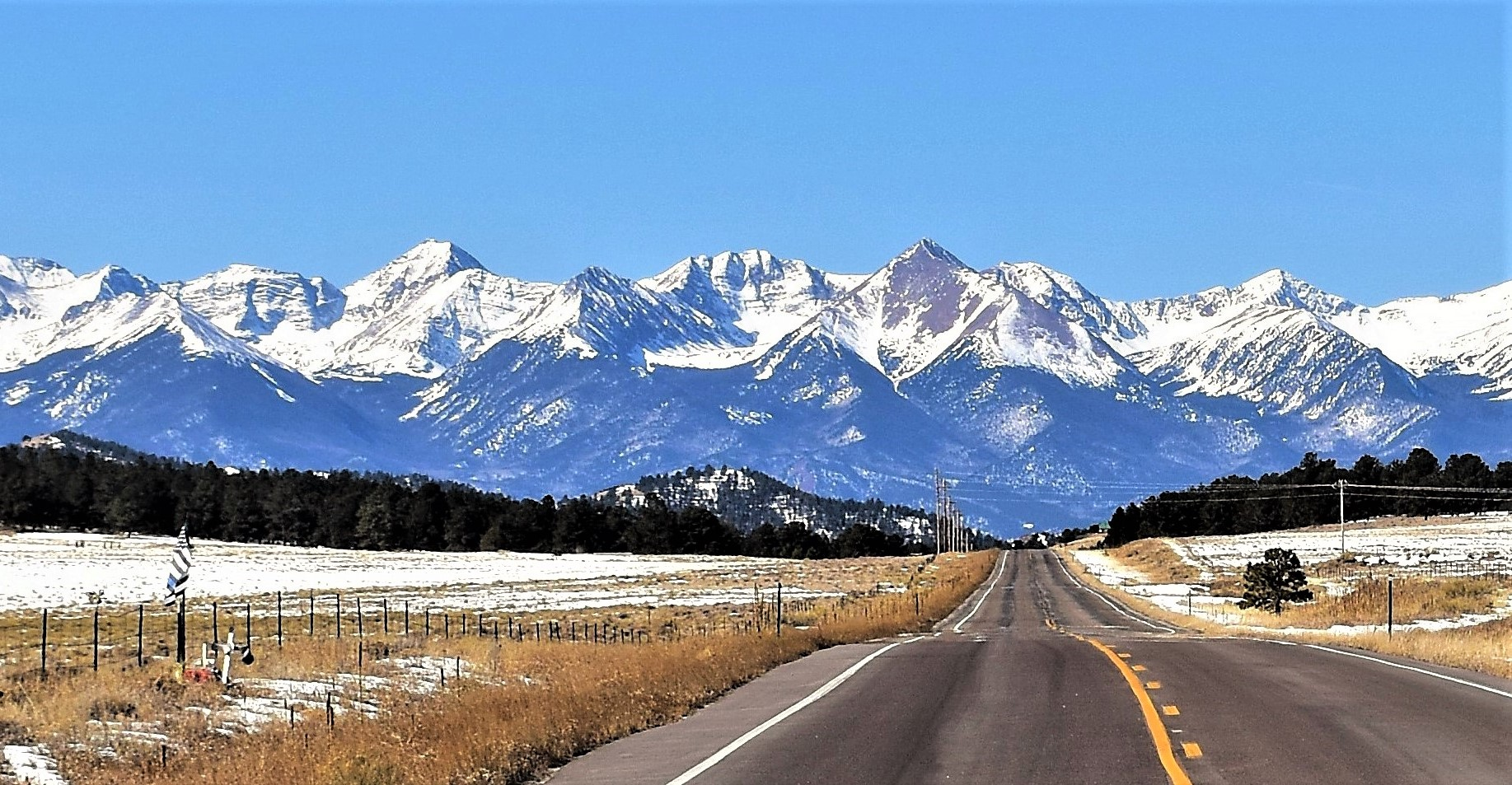
Fluted Peak centered on skyline. Horn Peak to immediate right, and Mt. Adams to left.

== Climate ==
According to the Köppen climate classification system, Fluted Peak is located in an alpine subarctic climate zone with cold, snowy winters, and cool to warm summers. Due to its altitude, it receives precipitation all year, as snow in winter and as thunderstorms in summer, with a dry period in late spring.

== See also ==
- Sangre de Cristo Mountains
- Thirteener
