= Twin Peaks (Sangre de Cristo) =

Mountain in Alamosa County, Colorado, United States

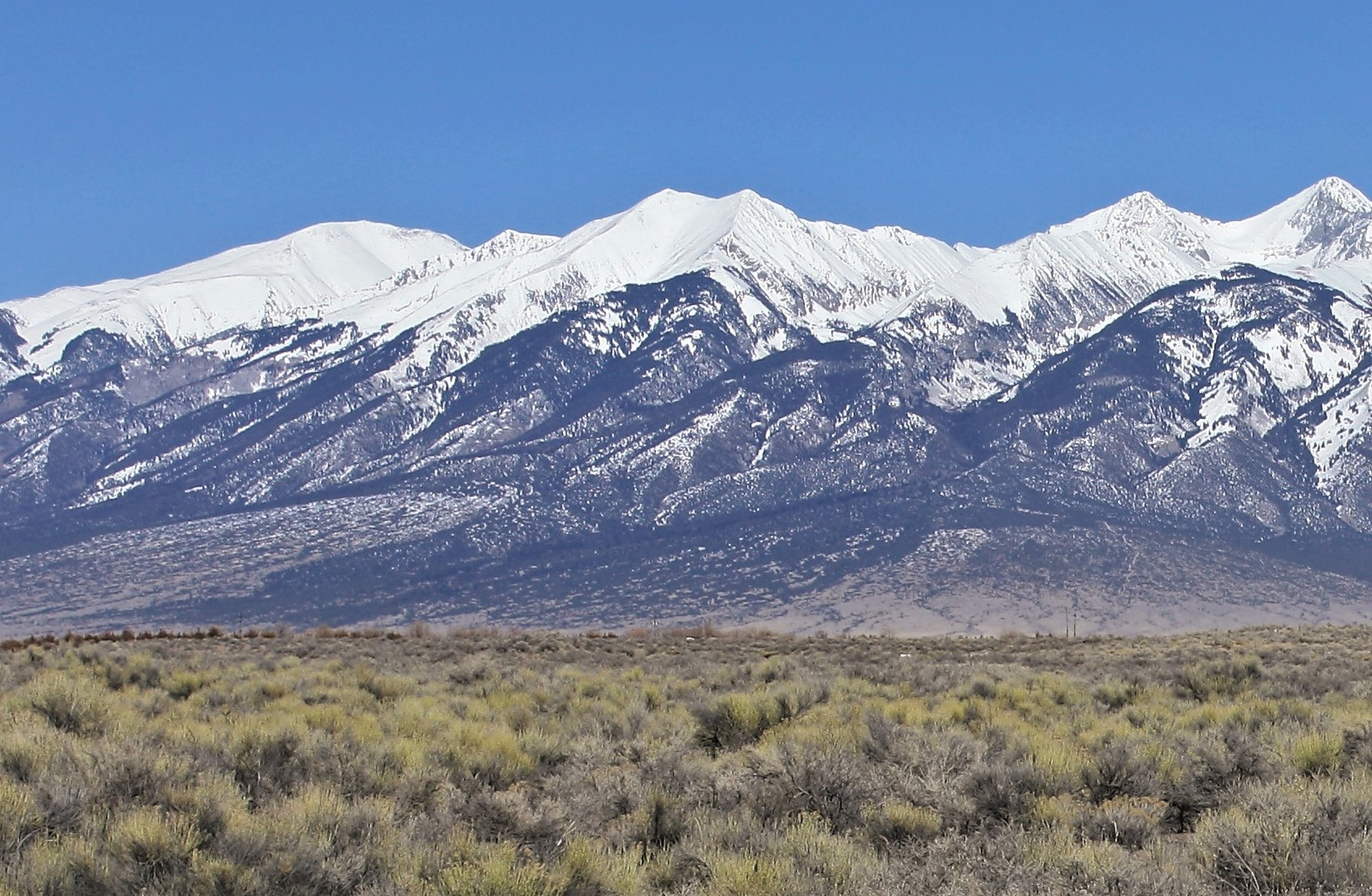
- West aspect, centered

Highest point
- Elevation: 13,580 ft (4,140 m)
- Prominence: 656 ft (200 m)
- Parent peak: Ellingwood Point (14,048 ft)
- Isolation: 1.20 mi (1.93 km)
- Coordinates: 37°35′24″N 105°31′09″W

Geography
- Location within Colorado Location within the United States
- Country: United States
- State: Colorado
- County: Alamosa
- Protected area: Sangre de Cristo Wilderness
- Parent range: Rocky Mountains; Sangre de Cristo Range
- Topo map: USGS Twin Peaks

Geology
- Mountain type: Fault block

Climbing
- Easiest route: class 2

Twin Peaks is a mountain summit in Alamosa County, Colorado, United States.

== Description ==
Twin Peaks is set in the Sangre de Cristo Range which is a subrange of the Rocky Mountains. It is the sixth-highest summit in Alamosa County and the 198th-highest in Colorado. The north peak is the true summit at 13,580-feet-elevation (4,139 m) and is separated by one-quarter mile from the south peak (13,534-ft (4,125 m)). The mountain is located 20 miles (32 km) east-northeast of the town of Alamosa in the Sangre de Cristo Wilderness, on land managed by Rio Grande National Forest. Precipitation runoff from the mountain's slopes drains to the San Luis Valley via Zapata, Urraca, and Pioneer creeks. Topographic relief is significant as the summit rises over 5,800 feet (1,768 m) above the valley in four miles (6.4 km). The mountain's toponym has been officially adopted by the United States Board on Geographic Names.

== Climate ==
According to the Köppen climate classification system, Twin Peaks has an alpine climate with cold, snowy winters, and cool to warm summers. Due to its altitude, it receives precipitation all year, as snow in winter and as thunderstorms in summer, with a dry period in late spring. Climbers can expect afternoon rain, hail, and lightning from the seasonal monsoon in late July and August.

== See also ==
- Thirteener
