= Milwaukee Peak =

Mountain in Colorado, United States

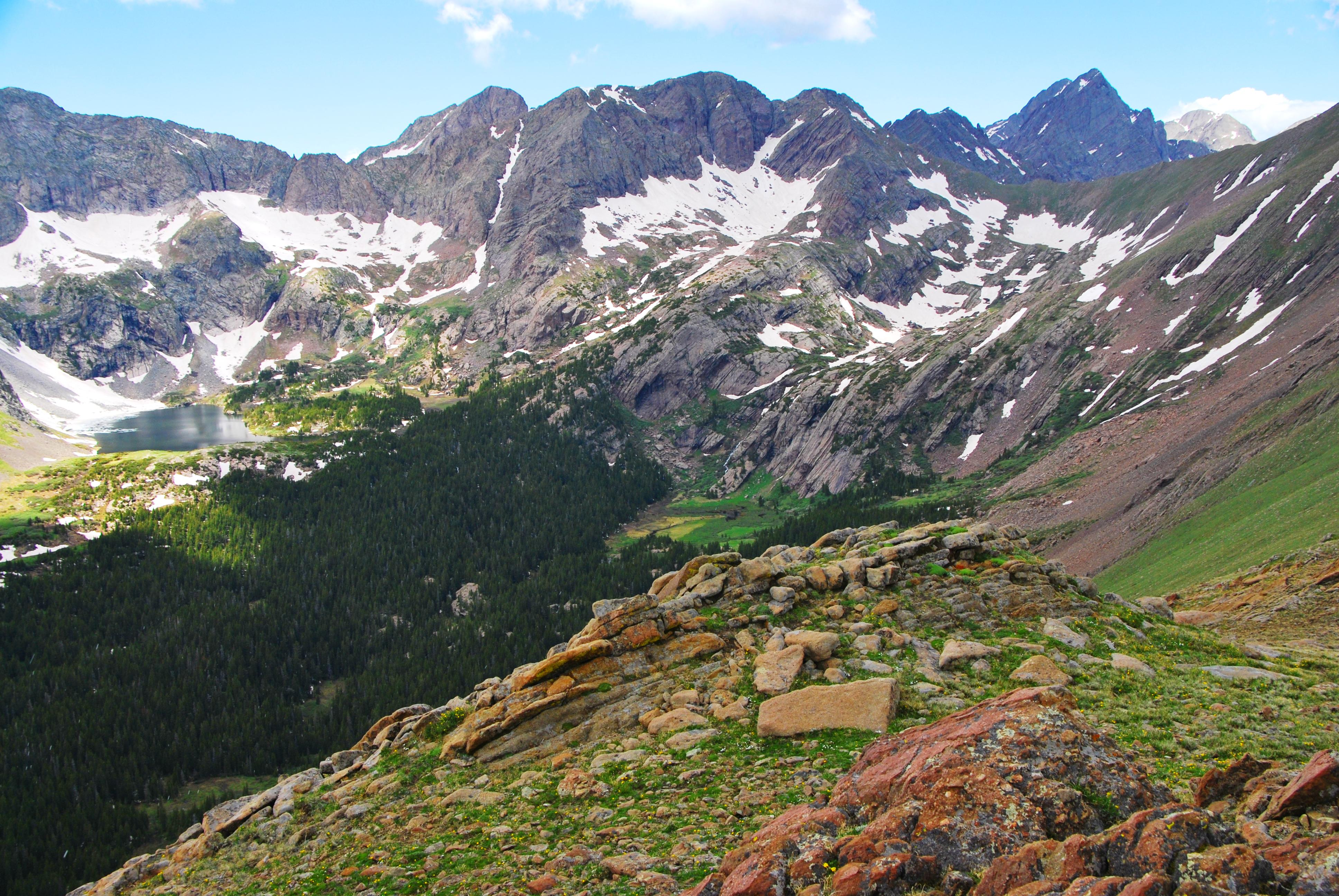
- East aspect, centered at top (Crestone Needle at upper right)

Highest point
- Elevation: 13,522 ft (4,122 m)
- Prominence: 297 ft (91 m)
- Parent peak: Pico Aislado (13,611 ft)
- Isolation: 0.47 mi (0.76 km)
- Coordinates: 37°56′52″N 105°33′05″W

Geography
- Location within Colorado Location within the United States
- Country: United States
- State: Colorado
- County: Saguache
- Protected area: Sangre de Cristo Wilderness; Great Sand Dunes Preserve
- Parent range: Rocky Mountains; Sangre de Cristo Range
- Topo map: USGS Crestone Peak

Geology
- Mountain type: Fault block

Climbing
- Easiest route: class 4 scrambling

Milwaukee Peak is a 13,522-foot (4,122 m) mountain summit in Saguache County, Colorado, United States.

== Description ==
Milwaukee Peak is set on the crest of the Sangre de Cristo Range which is a subrange of the Rocky Mountains. The mountain is located on the boundary shared by Sangre de Cristo Wilderness and Great Sand Dunes National Park and Preserve. Precipitation runoff from the mountain's eastern slope drains into headwaters of Sand Creek, the west slope drains into Cottonwood and Deadman creeks, and all three flow into the San Luis Valley. Topographic relief is significant as the summit rises 1,777 feet (542 m) above Upper Sand Creek Lake in 0.75 mile (1.2 km). The mountain's toponym has been officially adopted by the United States Board on Geographic Names.

== Climate ==
According to the Köppen climate classification system, Milwaukee Peak has an alpine climate with cold, snowy winters, and cool to warm summers. Due to its altitude, it receives precipitation all year, as snow in winter and as thunderstorms in summer, with a dry period in late spring. Climbers can expect afternoon rain, hail, and lightning from the seasonal monsoon in late July and August.

== See also ==
- Sangre de Cristo Mountains
- Thirteener
