= Electric Peak (Sangre de Cristo) =

Mountain in the state of Colorado

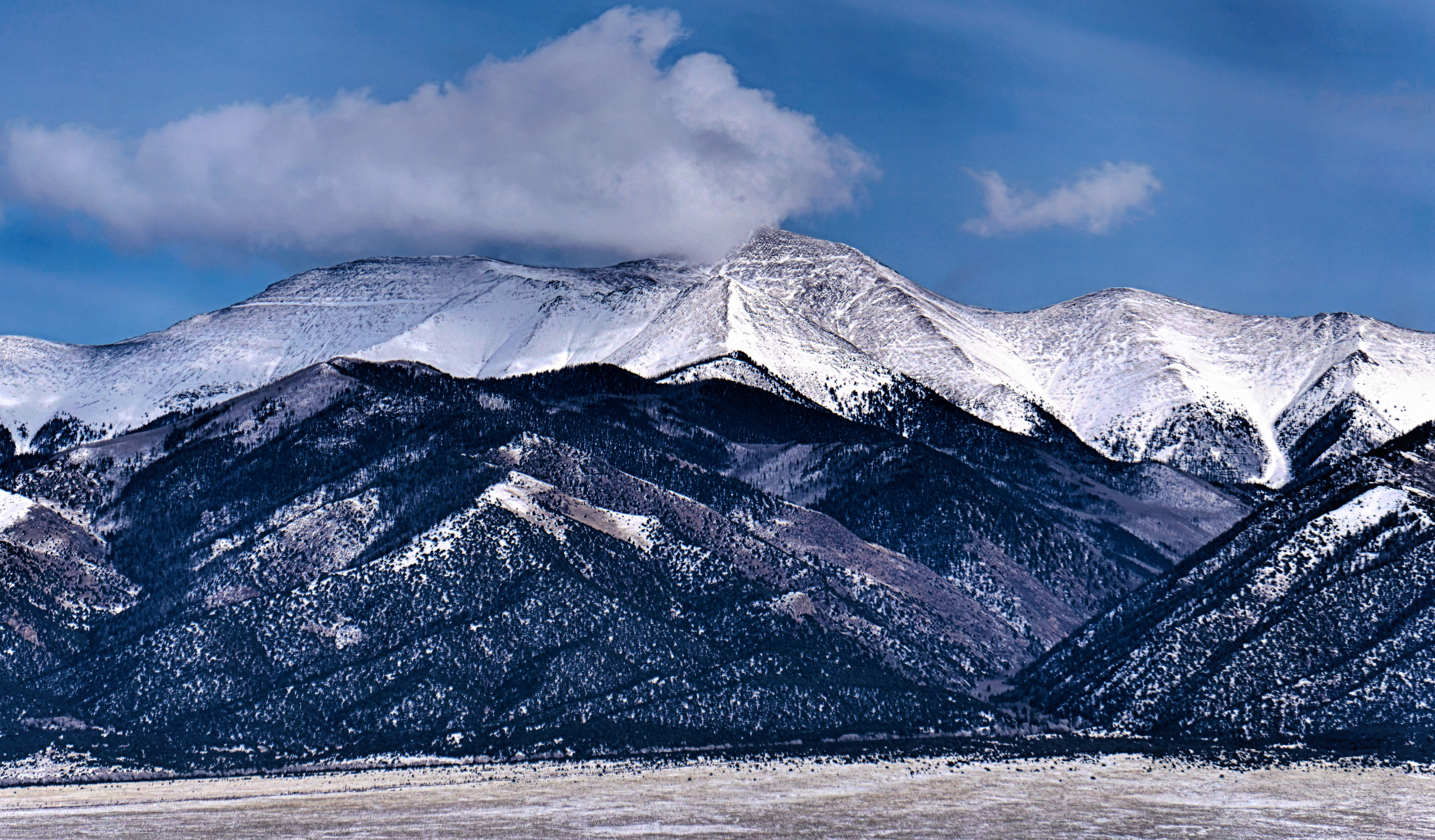
- Southwest aspect in winter

Highest point
- Elevation: 13,598 ft (4,145 m)
- Prominence: 961 ft (293 m)
- Parent peak: Rito Alto Peak (13,803 ft)
- Isolation: 6.04 mi (9.72 km)
- Coordinates: 38°10′54″N 105°42′30″W

Geography
- Location within Colorado Location within the United States
- Country: United States
- State: Colorado
- County: Custer / Saguache
- Protected area: Sangre de Cristo Wilderness
- Parent range: Rocky Mountains; Sangre de Cristo Range
- Topo map: USGS Electric Peak

Geology
- Mountain type: Fault block

Climbing
- Easiest route: class 2

Electric Peak is a 13,598-foot (4,145 m) mountain summit on the boundary shared by Custer and Saguache counties, in Colorado, United States.

== Description ==
Electric Peak is set on the crest of the Sangre de Cristo Range which is a subrange of the Rocky Mountains. It is the sixth-highest summit in Custer County and the 185th-highest in Colorado. The mountain is located 13.5 miles (21.7 km) west-northwest of the town of Westcliffe in the Sangre de Cristo Wilderness, on land managed by San Isabel National Forest and Rio Grande National Forest. Precipitation runoff from the mountain's eastern slopes drains into Brush Creek → Texas Creek → Arkansas River, whereas the west slope drains into Cotton Creek which flows to the San Luis Valley. Topographic relief is significant as the summit rises 1,200 feet (366 m) above Banjo Lake in 0.4 mile (0.64 km) and 3,200 feet (975 m) above Cotton Creek in 1.5 mile (2.4 km). An ascent of the summit involves 15 miles of hiking with 5,300 feet of elevation gain. The summit lies 1,000 ft. higher and S of Electric Pass. The mountain's toponym was applied by the Hayden Survey and officially adopted in 1906 by the United States Board on Geographic Names.

== Climate ==
According to the Köppen climate classification system, Electric Peak is located in an alpine subarctic climate zone with cold, snowy winters, and cool to warm summers. Due to its altitude, it receives precipitation all year, as snow in winter and as thunderstorms in summer, with a dry period in late spring. Climbers can expect afternoon rain, hail, and lightning (hence this peak's name) from the seasonal monsoon in late July and August.

== See also ==
- Electric Peak (San Juan Mountains)
- Thirteener
