= Cottonwood Peak (Colorado) =

Mountain peak in the Rockies

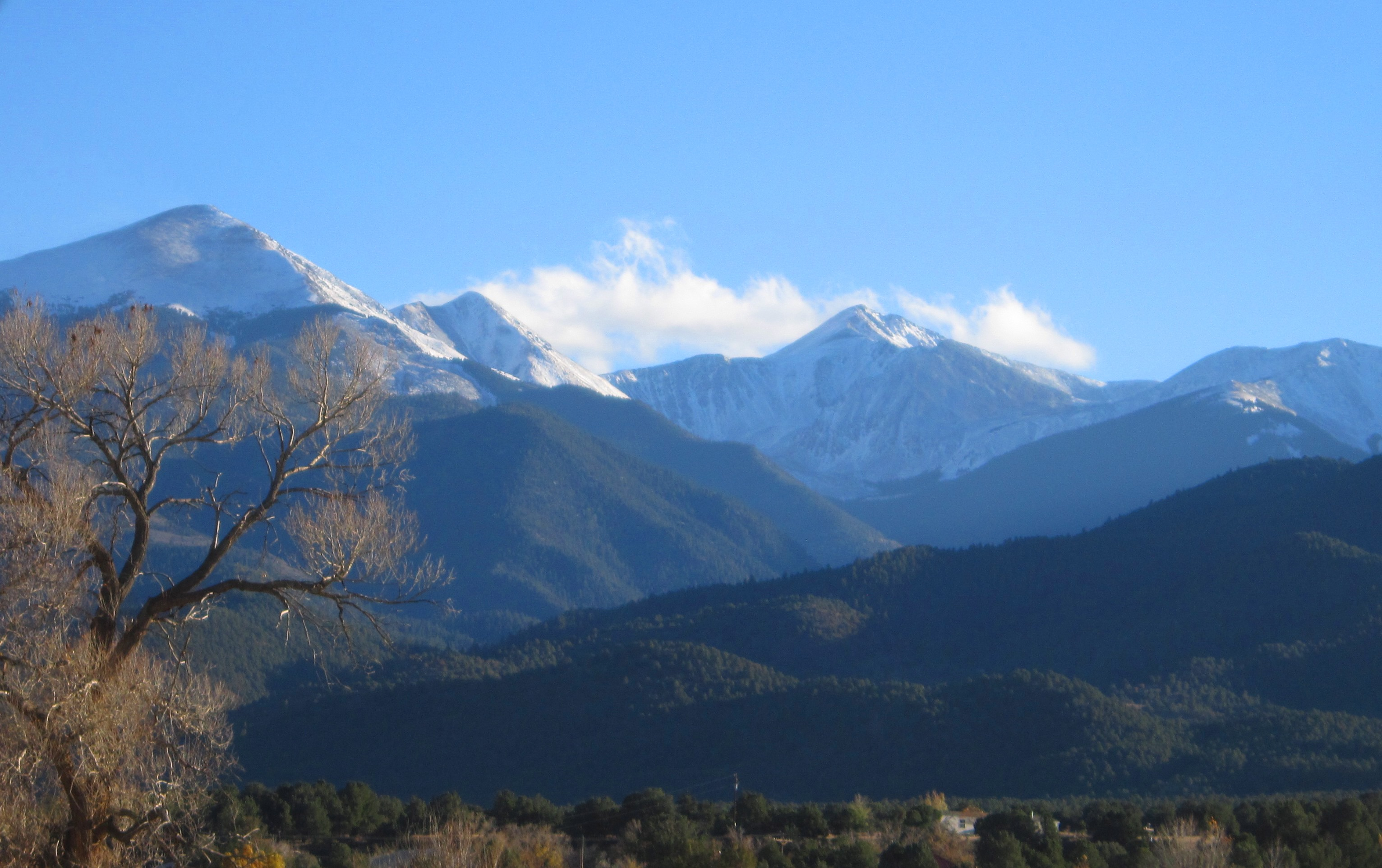
- North aspect, right of center, from Coaldale (Wulsten Baldy to the left)

Highest point
- Elevation: 13,588 ft (4,142 m)
- Prominence: 1,128 ft (344 m)
- Parent peak: Electric Peak (13,598 ft)
- Isolation: 3.69 mi (5.94 km)
- Coordinates: 38°13′09″N 105°45′23″W

Geography
- Location within Colorado Location within the United States
- Country: United States
- State: Colorado
- County: Custer / Saguache
- Protected area: Sangre de Cristo Wilderness
- Parent range: Rocky Mountains; Sangre de Cristo Range
- Topo map: USGS Valley View Hot Springs

Geology
- Mountain type: Fault block

Climbing
- Easiest route: class 2

Cottonwood Peak is a 13,588-foot (4,142 m) mountain summit on the boundary shared by Custer and Saguache counties, in Colorado, United States.

== Description ==
Cottonwood Peak is set on the crest of the Sangre de Cristo Range which is a subrange of the Rocky Mountains. It is the seventh-highest summit in Custer County and the 191st-highest in Colorado. The mountain is located 10 miles (16 km) south of Coaldale in the Sangre de Cristo Wilderness, on land managed by San Isabel National Forest and Rio Grande National Forest. Precipitation runoff from the mountain's eastern slopes drains to Lake Creek → Texas Creek → Arkansas River, whereas the west slope drains to the San Luis Valley. Topographic relief is significant as the summit rises over 3,200 feet (975 m) above Garner Creek in 1.5 mile (2.4 km). An ascent of the summit involves 12 miles of hiking with 5,400 feet of elevation gain. The mountain's toponym has been officially adopted by the United States Board on Geographic Names.

== Climate ==
According to the Köppen climate classification system, Cottonwood Peak is located in an alpine subarctic climate zone with cold, snowy winters, and cool to warm summers. Due to its altitude, it receives precipitation all year, as snow in winter and as thunderstorms in summer, with a dry period in late spring. Climbers can expect afternoon rain, hail, and lightning from the seasonal monsoon in late July and August.

== See also ==
- Thirteener
