= Fluted Peak =

Fluted Peak may refer to:

- Singu Chuli, a 6,501 metre trekking peak in central Nepal
- Fluted Peak (Colorado), a high mountain summit in Colorado, U.S.
- Fluted Peak (Antarctica), GNIS feature id 5068
