= Rito Alto Peak =

Mountain in the state of Colorado

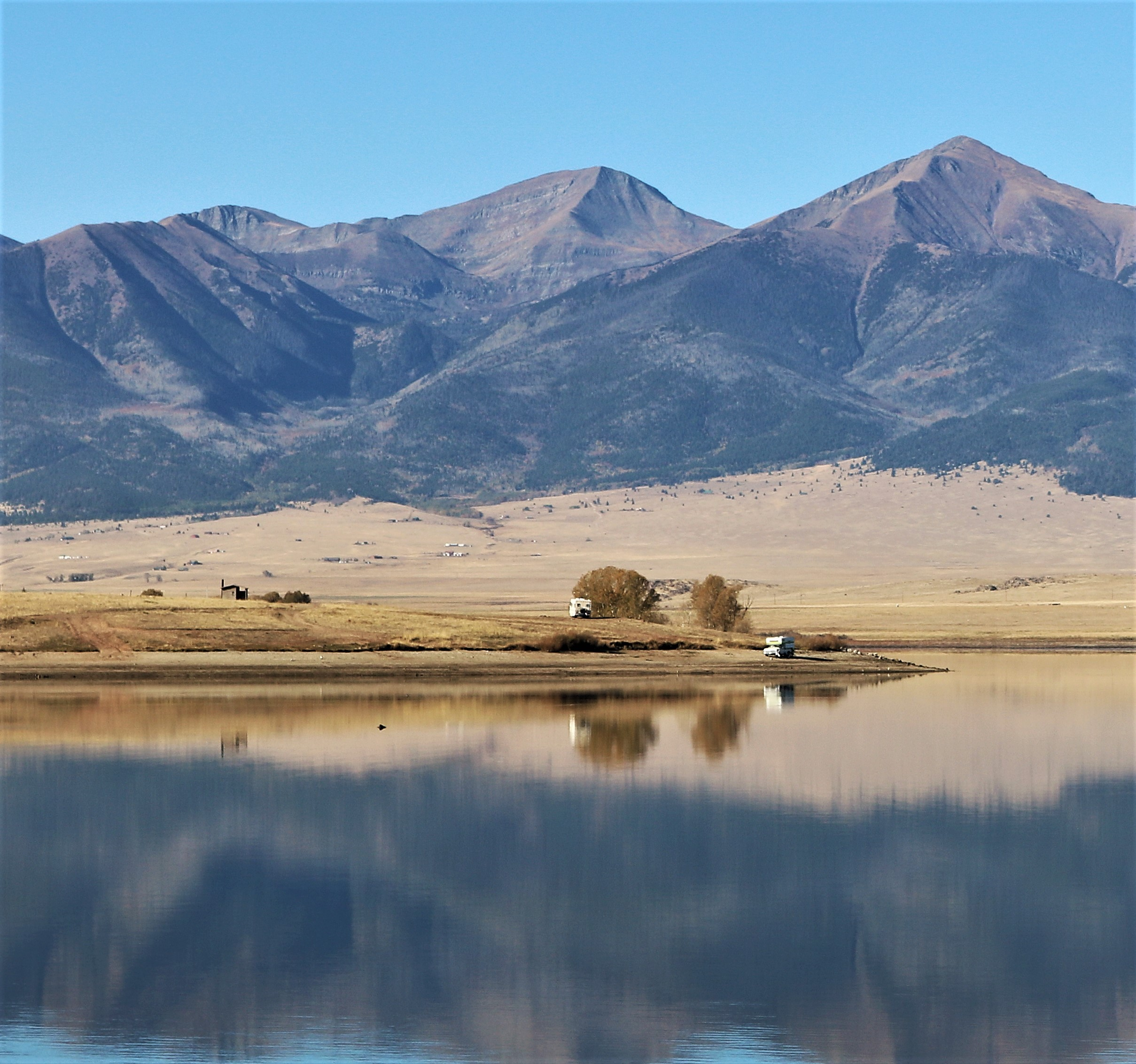
- Rito Alto Peak (center) and Spread Eagle Peak (right) from DeWeese Reservoir

Highest point
- Elevation: 13,803 ft (4,207 m)
- Prominence: 1,134 ft (346 m)
- Parent peak: Mount Adams
- Isolation: 7.28 mi (11.72 km)
- Listing: Colorado range high points
- Coordinates: 38°06′10″N 105°39′41″W

Geography
- Location within Colorado
- Location: Custer and Saguache counties, Colorado, U.S.
- Parent range: Sangre de Cristo Range
- Topo map(s): USGS 7.5' topographic map Rito Alto Peak, Colorado

Climbing
- Easiest route: hike

Rito Alto Peak, elevation 13,803 ft (4,207 m), is a summit in the Sangre de Cristo Range of south central Colorado. The peak is 11 mi (18 km) west of Westcliffe in the Rio Grande and San Isabel national forests.

== See also ==
- List of Colorado mountain ranges
- List of Colorado mountain summits
  - List of Colorado fourteeners
  - List of Colorado 4000 meter prominent summits
  - List of the most prominent summits of Colorado
- List of Colorado county high points

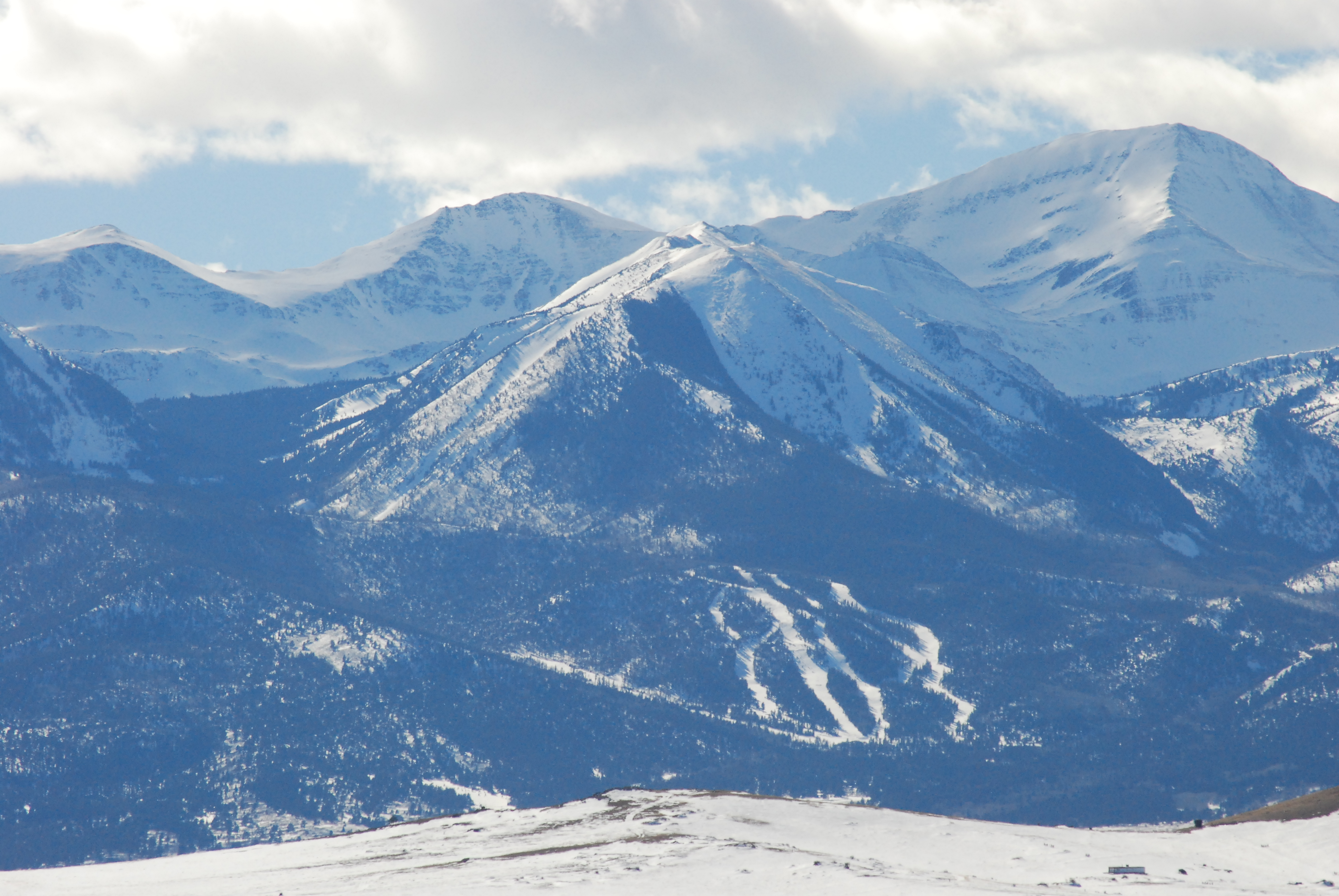
East aspect, upper right
