= Pico Aislado =

Mountain in Colorado, United States

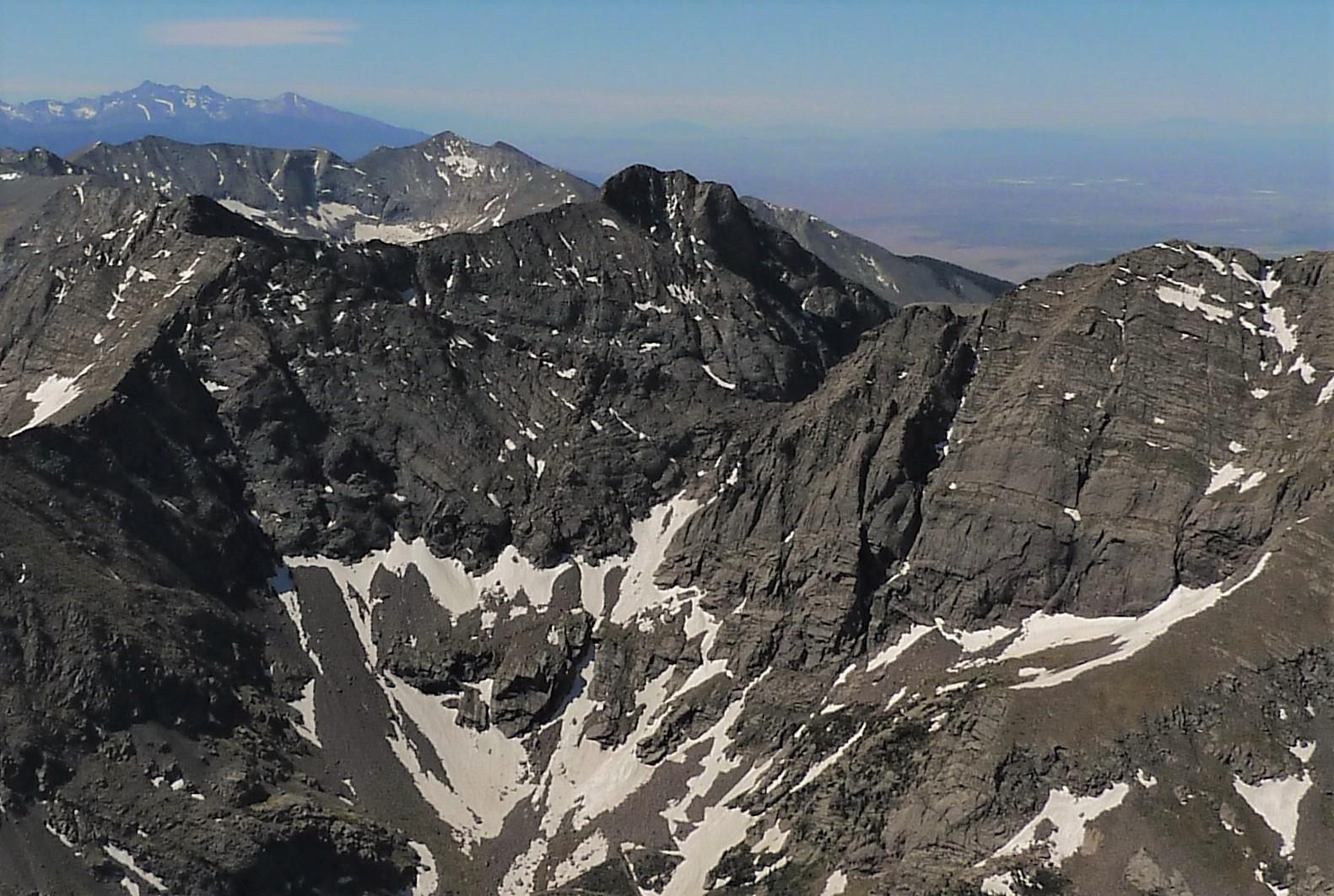
- North aspect (center), viewed from Humboldt Peak

Highest point
- Elevation: 13,611 ft (4,149 m)
- Prominence: 883 ft (269 m)
- Parent peak: Crestone Needle (14,203 ft)
- Isolation: 1.71 mi (2.75 km)
- Coordinates: 37°56′40″N 105°33′32″W

Naming
- Etymology: "Isolated Peak"

Geography
- Location within Colorado Location within the United States
- Country: United States
- State: Colorado
- County: Saguache
- Protected area: Sangre de Cristo Wilderness
- Parent range: Rocky Mountains; Sangre de Cristo Range
- Topo map: USGS Crestone Peak

Geology
- Mountain type: Fault block

Climbing
- Easiest route: Hiking class 2

Pico Aislado is a 13,611-foot (4,149 m) mountain summit in Saguache County, Colorado, United States.

== Description ==
Pico Aislado is set one-half mile west of the crest of the Sangre de Cristo Range which is a subrange of the Rocky Mountains. It is the 16th-highest summit in Saguache County, and the 184th-highest in Colorado. The peak is located in the Sangre de Cristo Wilderness on land managed by Rio Grande National Forest. Precipitation runoff from the mountain's slopes drains into Deadman and Cottonwood creeks which flow west into San Luis Valley. Topographic relief is significant as the summit rises 2,400 feet (732 m) above Deadman Creek in one mile (1.6 km).

== Etymology ==
The mountain's toponym was officially adopted in 1972 by the United States Board on Geographic Names. The Spanish language name translates as "Isolated Peak" and refers its remote location, which was suggested by the Colorado Mountain Club.

== Climate ==
According to the Köppen climate classification system, Pico Aislado is located in an alpine subarctic climate zone with cold, snowy winters, and cool to warm summers. Due to its altitude, it receives precipitation all year, as snow in winter, and as thunderstorms in summer, with a dry period in late spring. Climbers can expect afternoon rain, hail, and lightning from the seasonal monsoon in late July and August.

== See also ==
- Sangre de Cristo Mountains
- Thirteener
