= Little Bear Peak =

Mountain in the state of Colorado United States

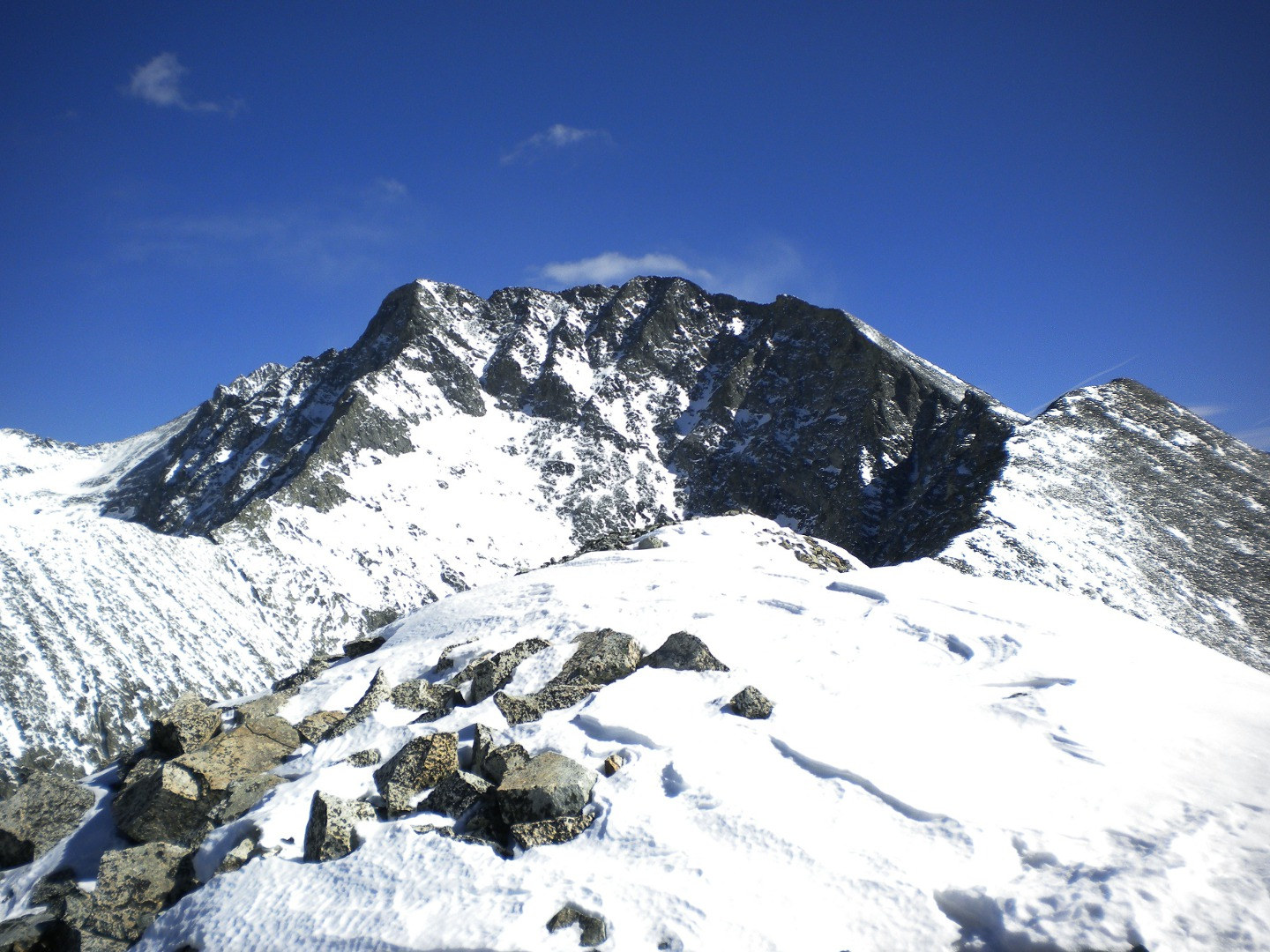
- Little Bear Peak from the Southwest Ridge

Highest point
- Elevation: 14,039.5 ft (4,279.2 m); NAPGD2022
- Prominence: 377 ft (115 m)
- Parent peak: Blanca Peak
- Isolation: 0.96 mi (1.54 km)
- Listing: Colorado Fourteener 44th
- Coordinates: 37°34′00″N 105°29′50″W

Geography
- Location within Colorado
- Location: Alamosa and Costilla counties, Colorado, United States
- Parent range: Sangre de Cristo Range, Sierra Blanca Massif
- Topo map(s): USGS 7.5' topographic map Blanca Peak, Colorado

Climbing
- Easiest route: The Hourglass: Climb, class 4

Little Bear Peak is a high mountain summit in the Sangre de Cristo Range of the Rocky Mountains of North America. The 14,039.5-foot (4,279 m) fourteener is located on the Sierra Blanca Massif, 8.8 miles (14.2 km) north by east (bearing 6°) of the Town of Blanca, Colorado, United States, on the drainage divide separating Rio Grande National Forest and Alamosa County from the Sangre de Cristo Land Grant and Costilla County. Little Bear lies 0.96 miles (1.54 km) southwest of Blanca Peak, the ultra prominent fourteener that is the highest point of the massif.

== Mountain ==
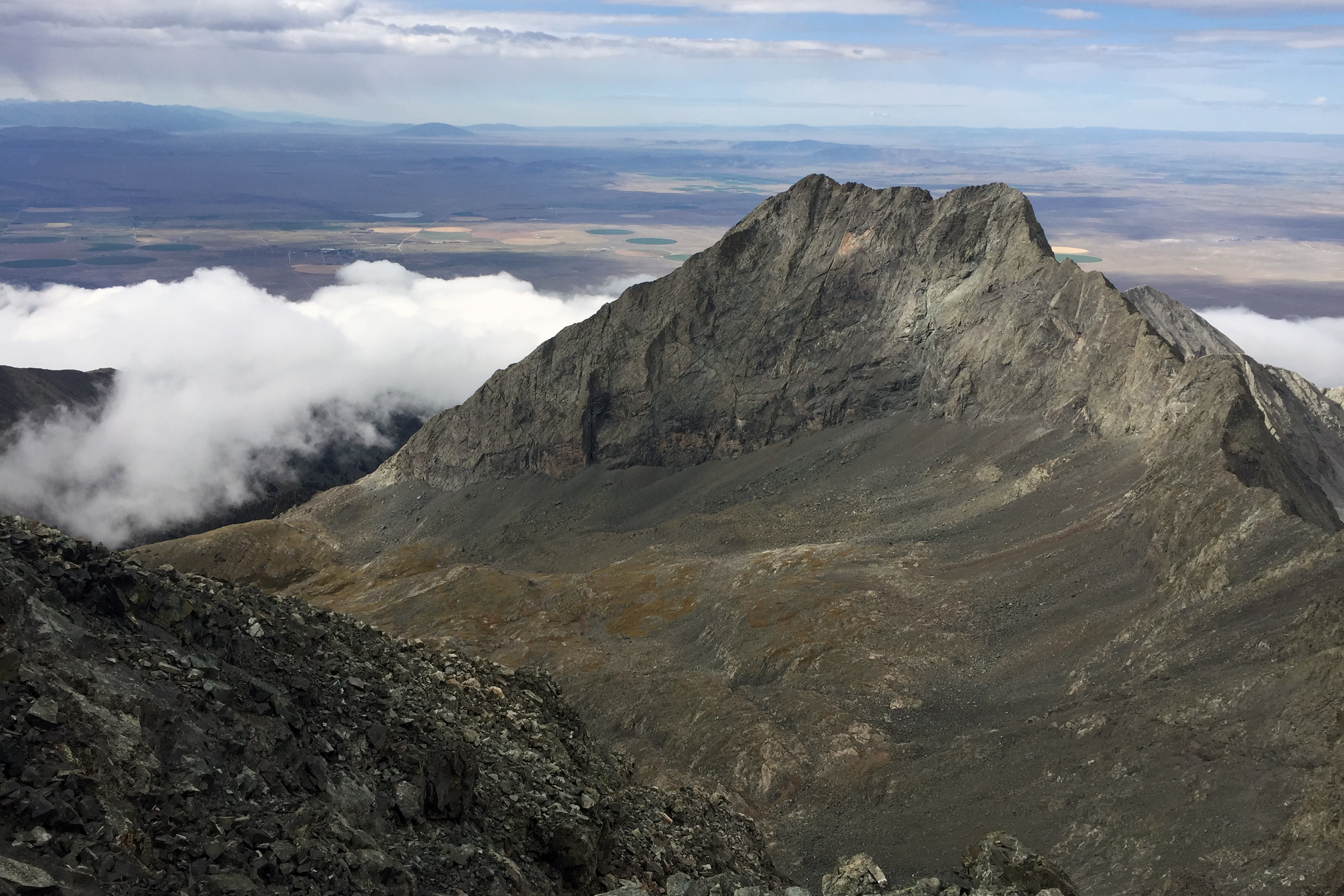
Little Bear Peak from Blanca Peak summit

Like the rest of the Sierra Blanca Massif, Little Bear is composed of pre-Cambrian granite estimated to be approximately 1.8 billion years old. Along with nearby Blanca Peak and Ellingwood Point Little Bear rises nearly 7,000 feet above the San Luis Valley to the west and south. The peak sits atop a long ridge separating two glacier-carved valleys.

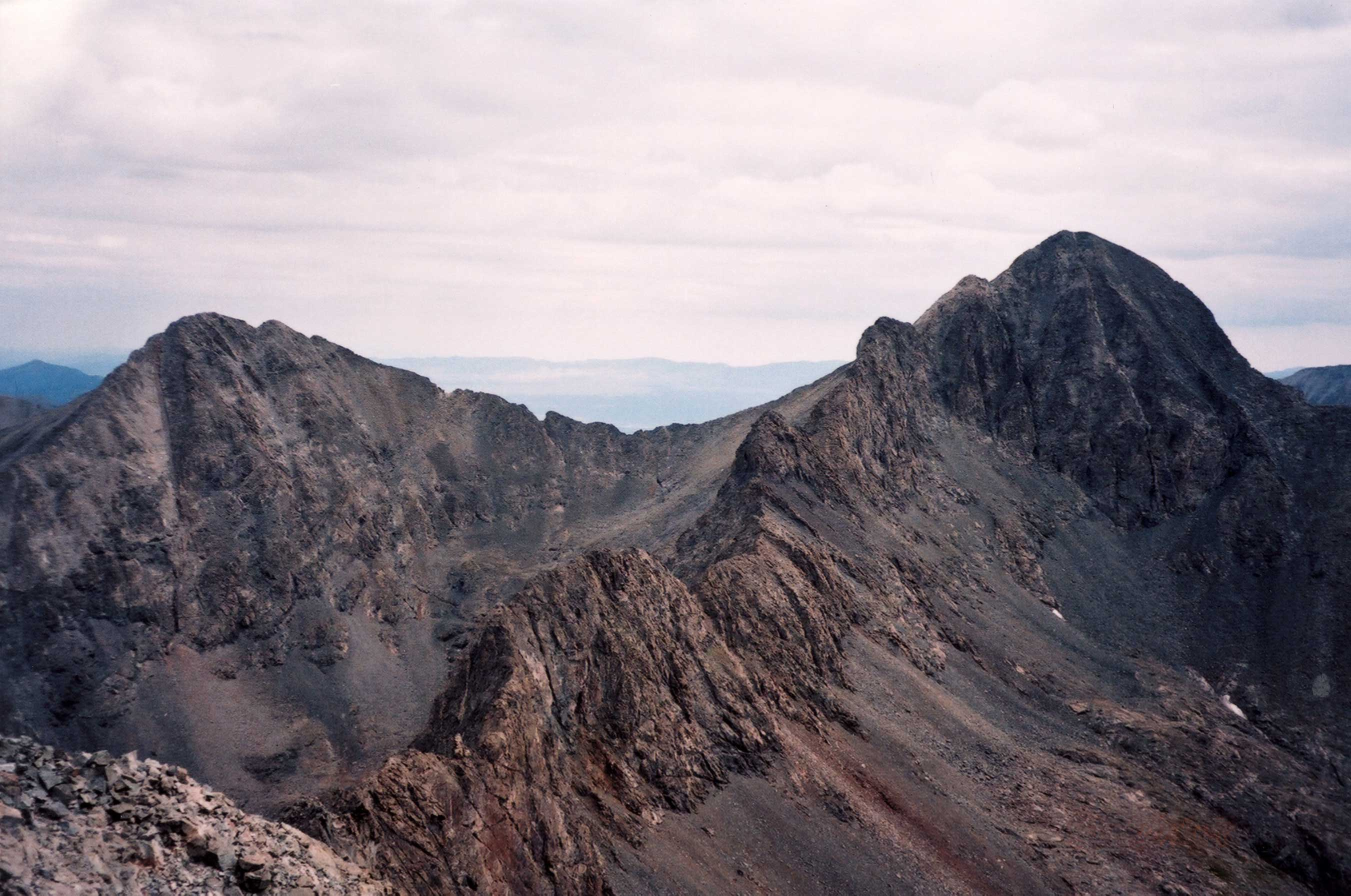
The connecting ridge between Little Bear Peak and Blanca Peak

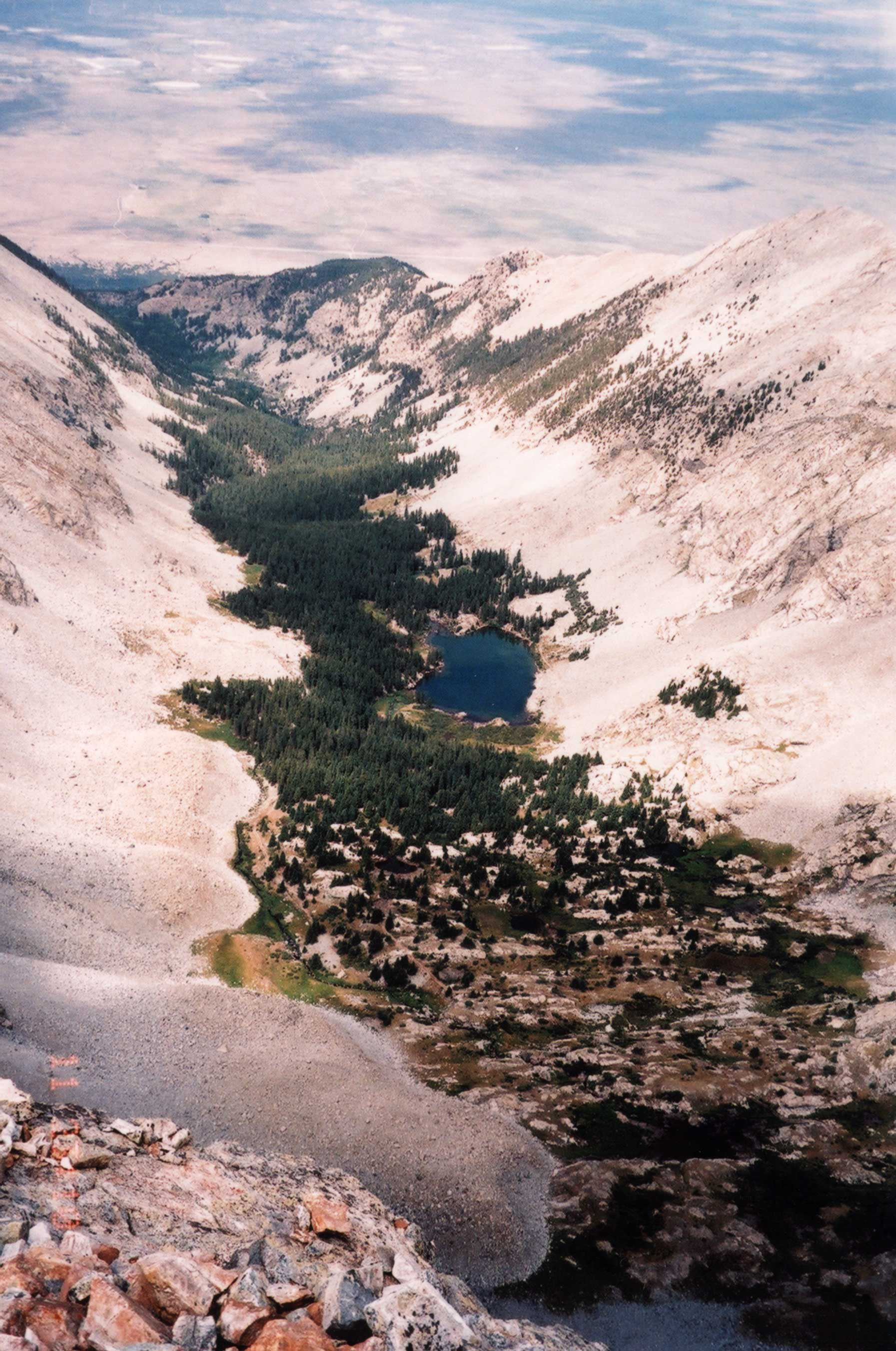
Looking down on Como Lake from the summit of Little Bear

While Little Bear itself has little more than the minimum 300 feet of prominence to qualify as a separate peak, it is notable for being one of the most technically difficult and dangerous of the fourteeners to climb. The upper part of the standard route leads through a 300' section known as the Hourglass: a water-polished granite slab famous for the amount of rockfall. There is another technical route that climbs the northwest face of Little Bear from above the Blue Lakes and gains over 6,200 ft in elevation. The easiest climbing routes on the mountain are on the eastern side, rising out of the private property in Blanca Basin.

The connecting ridge to Blanca Peak is one of the most challenging outings of its type in the state. Experts say the traverse is easier going from Little Bear to Blanca but once a climber commits to the traverse, he's committed to the end. There are only a couple places down off the rock that are reasonably safe and they drop into Blanca Basin.

Little Bear is bisected by the boundary between the Rio Grande National Forest to the west and private property to the east, and is on the border between Alamosa County and Costilla County.

== Historical names ==
- Little Bear
- Little Bear Peak
- West Peak

== See also ==
- List of mountain peaks of Colorado
  - List of Colorado fourteeners
