= Sangre de Cristo Range =

American mountain range

- Northern Sangre de Cristo Mountains
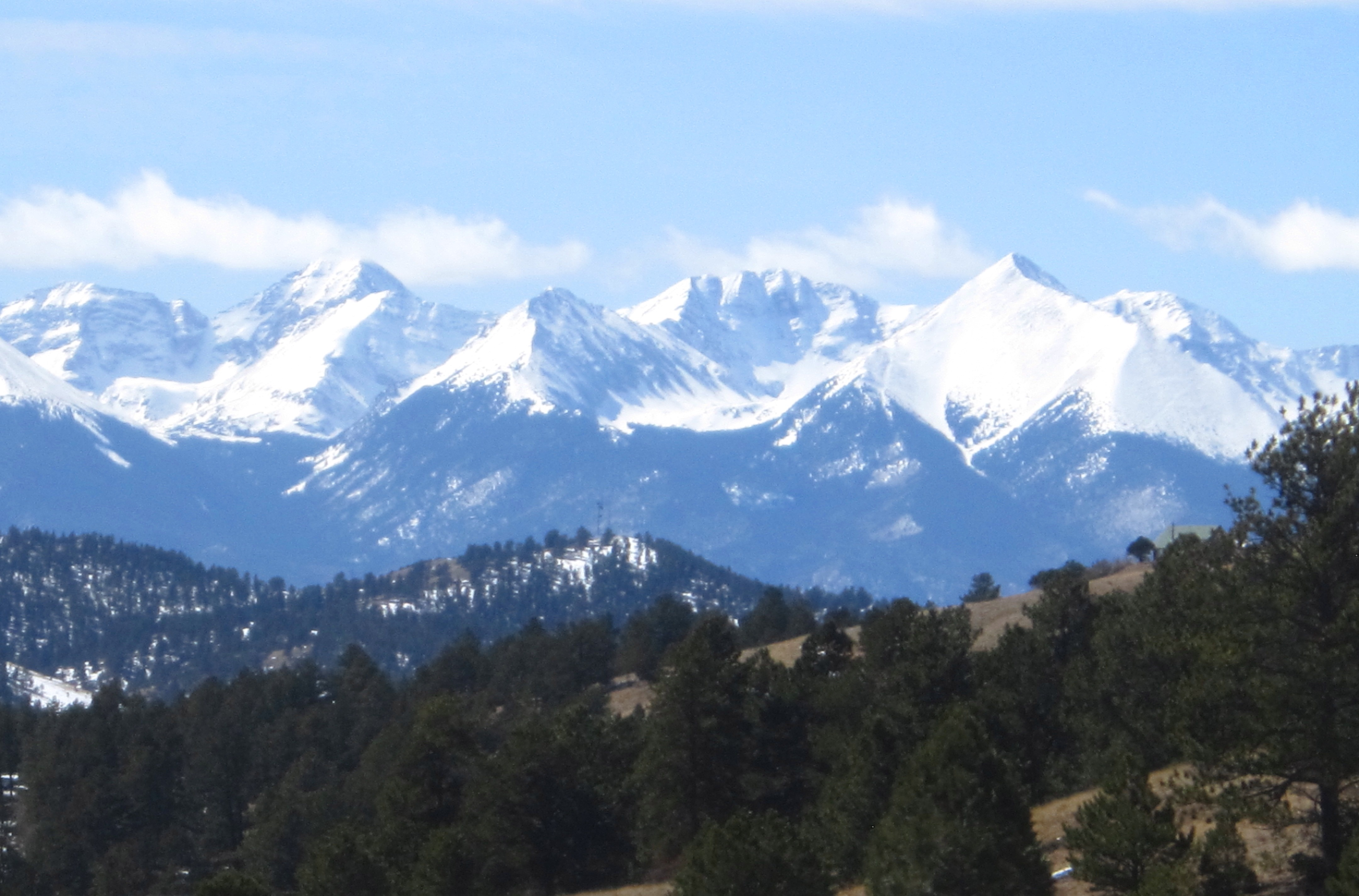
- Sangre de Cristo Range seen from Hardscrabble Pass.

Highest point
- Peak: Blanca Peak
- Elevation: 14,345 ft (4,372 m)
- Coordinates: 37°34′38″N 105°29′7″W

Dimensions
- Length: 75 mi (121 km) north-south
- Width: 48 mi (77 km) east-west
- Area: 1,250 mi^{2} (3,200 km^{2})

Naming
- Etymology: Sangre de Cristo Spanish: Blood of Christ

Geography
- Location within Colorado
- Country: United States
- State: Colorado
- Counties: Chaffee; Fremont; Custer; Saguache; Huerfano
- Parent range: Sangre de Cristo Mountains, Rocky Mountains
- Borders on: San Luis Valley; Arkansas River watershed

Geology
- Orogeny: Fault-block mountains
- Rock ages: Precambrian; Permian-Pennsylvanian

The Sangre de Cristo Range is a mountain range in the Rocky Mountains in southern Colorado in the United States, running north and south along the east side of the Rio Grande Rift. The mountains extend southeast from Poncha Pass for about 75 mi (121 km) through south-central Colorado to La Veta Pass, approximately 20 mi (32 km) west of Walsenburg, and form a high ridge separating the San Luis Valley on the west from the watershed of the Arkansas River on the east. The Sangre de Cristo Range rises over 7,000 ft (2,100 m) above the valleys and plains to the west and northeast.

According to the USGS, the range is the northern part of the larger Sangre de Cristo Mountains, which extend through northern New Mexico. Usage of the terms "Sangre de Cristo Range" and "Sangre de Cristo Mountains" is varied; however, this article discusses only the mountains between Poncha Pass and La Veta Pass.

== Notable peaks ==
A 14er is a mountain peak that has an elevation of at least 14,000 feet. Colorado has 53, the most of any state. There are 10 14ers in the Sangre de Cristo Range, which can be seen in the table below.

Major peaks of the Sangre de Cristo Named peaks over 13,500 feet (4,100 m)
Peak name	Elevation	Prominence
Blanca Peak	14,351 ft (4,374 m)	5,326 ft (1,623 m)
Crestone Peak	14,299 ft (4,358 m)	4,534 ft (1,382 m)
Crestone Needle	14,197 ft (4,327 m)	437 ft (133 m)
Kit Carson Peak	14,165 ft (4,317 m)	1,005 ft (306 m)
Challenger Point	14,080 ft (4,290 m)	281 ft (86 m)
Humboldt Peak	14,064 ft (4,287 m)	1,164 ft (355 m)
Culebra Peak	14,047 ft (4,282 m)	4,806 ft (1,465 m)
Ellingwood Point	14,042 ft (4,280 m)	322 ft (98 m)
Mount Lindsey	14,042 ft (4,280 m)	1,522 ft (464 m)
Little Bear Peak	14,037 ft (4,278 m)	357 ft (109 m)
Columbia Point	13,960 ft (4,260 m)	320 ft (98 m)
Mount Adams	13,937 ft (4,248 m)	851 ft (259 m)
California Peak	13,855 ft (4,223 m)	609 ft (186 m)
Rito Alto Peak	13,800 ft (4,200 m)	1,114 ft (340 m)
Colony Baldy	13,711 ft (4,179 m)	905 ft (276 m)
Pico Aislado	13,612 ft (4,149 m)	837 ft (255 m)
Tijeras Peak	13,610 ft (4,150 m)	724 ft (221 m)
Electric Peak	13,601 ft (4,146 m)	915 ft (279 m)
Cottonwood Peak	13,504 ft (4,116 m)	1,108 ft (338 m)
Twin Peaks	13,560 ft (4,130 m)	600 ft (180 m)
Broken Hand Peak	13,579 ft (4,139 m)	653 ft (199 m)
Fluted Peak	13,560 ft (4,130 m)	714 ft (218 m)
Milwaukee Peak	13,528 ft (4,123 m)	282 ft (86 m)

== Geography ==
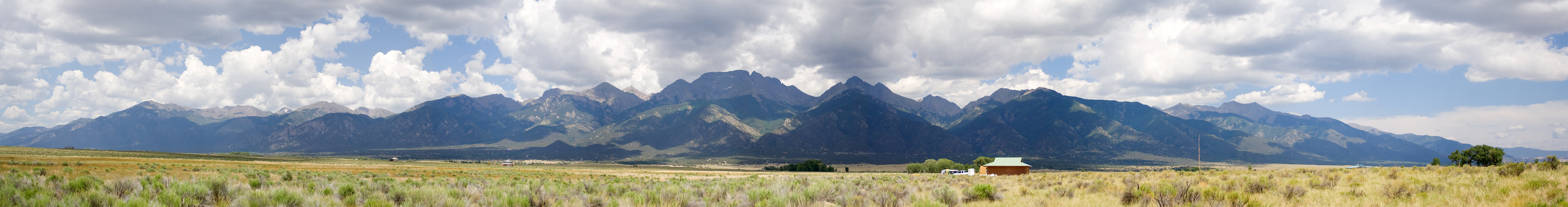
Seen from the San Luis Valley

The Sangre de Cristo Mountains run from Poncha Pass in Central Colorado to Glorieta Pass near Santa Fe, New Mexico. Most of the range is shared by two National Forests, which abut along the range divide. Most of the northeast (Arkansas River) side is located within the San Isabel National Forest, while most of the southwest (San Luis Valley) side is included in the Rio Grande National Forest. The central part of the range is designated as the Sangre de Cristo Wilderness. The Great Sand Dunes National Park and Preserve sits on the southwestern flank of the range at the edge of the San Luis Valley. The range divide is traversed by no paved roads, only by four-wheel drive and foot trails over Hayden Pass, Hermit Pass, Music Pass, Medano Pass, and Mosca Pass.

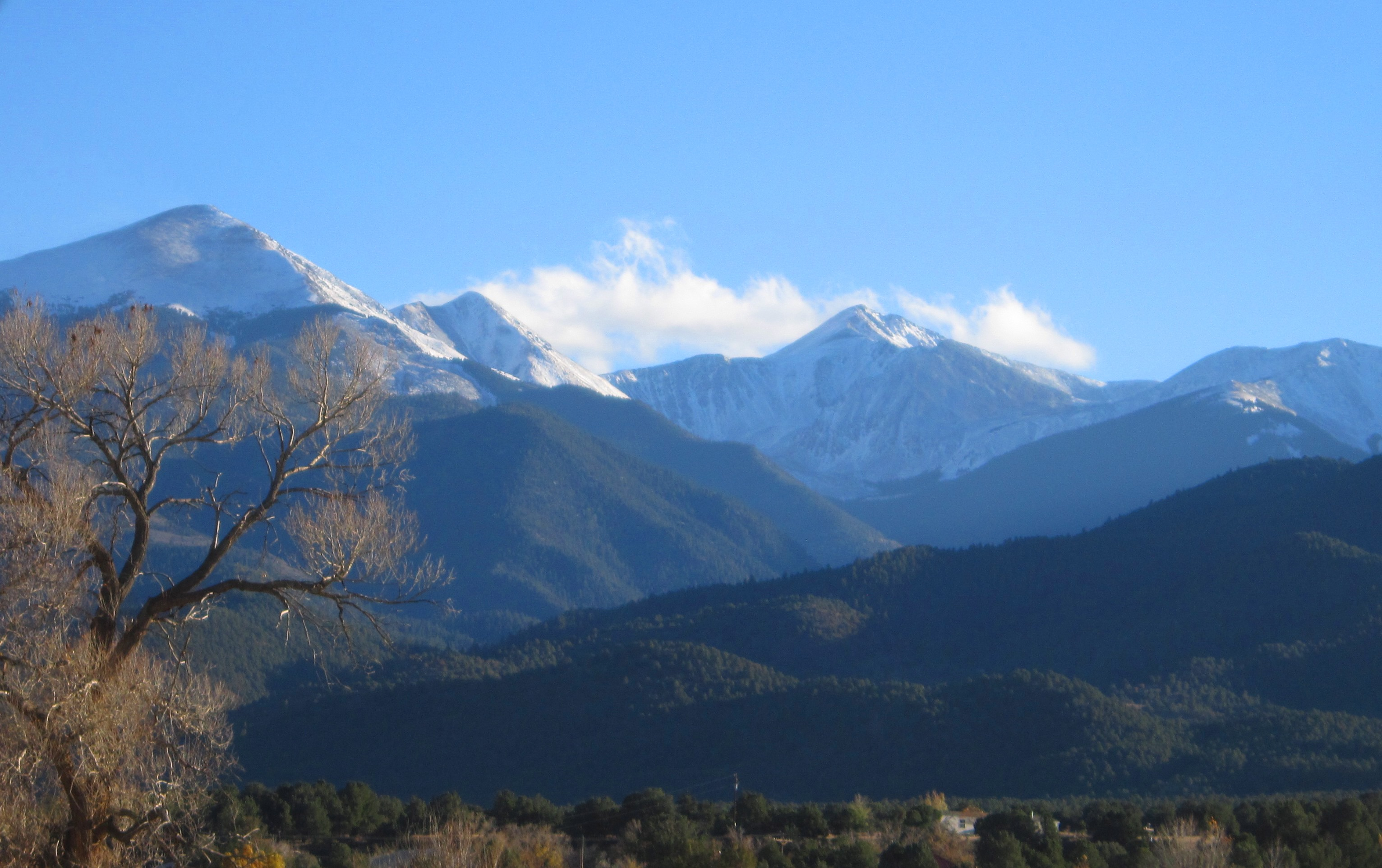
Northern Sangre de Cristo Range seen from Coaldale, Colorado.

The highest peak in the range, located in the south, is Blanca Peak at 14,345 ft (4,372 m); it is flanked by three other fourteeners: Little Bear Peak, Mount Lindsey, and Ellingwood Point. (Note: Ellingwood Point is not always counted as an official fourteener, as it has a high saddle connecting it with Blanca Peak, and hence a low topographic prominence.) Other well-known peaks are the fourteeners of the Crestone group: Kit Carson Mountain, Crestone Peak, Crestone Needle, and Humboldt Peak. Two sub-peaks of Kit Carson Mountain, Challenger Point and Columbia Point, are named in memory of the crews of the Space Shuttle Challenger and the Space Shuttle Columbia. The range is also home to many high peaks in the 13,000 to 14,000 foot (3,900-4,300 m) range as it continues into New Mexico. In New Mexico most of the mountain area is managed by the US Forest Service in the Carson and Santa Fe National Forests.

== Geology ==
The Colorado Sangre de Cristos are fault-block mountains similar to the Teton Range in Wyoming and the Wasatch Range in Utah. Major fault lines run along the east and west sides of the range, and cut right through the mountains in some places. Like all fault-block mountain ranges, the Sangre de Cristos lack foothills which means the highest peaks rise abruptly from the valleys to the east and west, rising 7,000 ft (2,100 m) in only a few miles in some places. The mountains were pushed up around 5 million years ago, basically as one large mass of rock. The Sangre de Cristo range is still being uplifted today as faults in the area remain active. Due to uplift (elevation increase) and erosion, rock layers are missing, causing gaps in the range, called "unconformities."

The Sangre de Cristo Range rising above the Great Sand Dunes National Park

On the west side is the San Luis Valley, a portion of the Rio Grande Rift. On the southeast side is the Raton Basin, a quiet but still active volcanic field. On the northeast side are the Wet Mountains and the Front Range, areas of Precambrian igneous and metamorphic rocks formed during the Colorado orogeny some 1.7 billion years ago and then uplifted more recently during the Laramide orogeny.

The Blanca Massif is also Precambrian rock, while most of the rest of the Sangres is composed of younger Permian-Pennsylvanian (about 250-million-year-old) rock, a mix of sedimentary conglomerates, silty mudstones and shales, sandstones, limestone beds and igneous intrusions. These sedimentary rocks originated as sediment eroded from the Ancestral Rocky Mountains. Crestone Conglomerate are a feature on many of the peaks, including Crestone Needle. The conglomerate settled near the uplift and contains boulders as large as 6 feet in diameter.

== Climate ==
Climate Data for Alamosa, Colorado (20 miles southwest of Blanca Peak)
Month	Average Low °F (°C)	Average High °F (°C)	Average Precipitation In (mm)	Average Snowfall In (cm)
January	-3.8 (-19.9)	33.3 (0.7)	0.3 (6.6)	4.7 (11.4)
February	4.8 (-15.1)	39.9 (4.4)	0.3 (7.4)	4.9 (11.7)
March	15.8 (-9.0)	48.7 (9.3)	0.5 (11.4)	7.4 (17.8)
April	23.5 (-4.7)	58.6 (14.8)	0.5 (12.4)	4.2 (10.2)
May	32.7 (0.4)	68.0 (20.0)	0.7 (16.3)	1.9 (4.6)
June	41.0 (5.0)	77.7 (25.4)	0.7 (17.0)	0.0 (0.0)
July	47.8 (8.8)	82.0 (27.8)	1.2 (30.2)	0.0 (0.0)
August	45.3 (7.4)	79.2 (26.2)	1.2 (28.4)	0.0 (0.0)
September	36.7 (2.6)	72.7 (22.6)	0.9 (22.6)	0.3 (0.8)
October	24.6 (-4.1)	62.4 (16.9)	0.7 (17.8)	3.8 (9.1)
November	12.4 (-10.9)	47.5 (8.6)	0.4 (10.9)	4.7 (11.4)
December	-0.6 (-18.1)	35.4 (1.9)	0.5 (11.2)	7.5 (18.0)
Year	23.4 (-4.8)	58.8 (14.88)	0.7 (16.02)	3.3 (7.92)

== History ==
Antonio Valverde y Cosio named the Sangre de Cristo range after the red-hue that he saw during the snowy sunrise. Sangre de Cristo means Blood of Christ in English.

In the formation of the range, we can see fossils of footprints, shells and bones.

In August 2009, the Sangre de Cristo Range was dedicated as a National Heritage Area (NHA), an area of cultural, natural, and historic preservation.

== Economy ==
Today, tourism is the main economic activity.

== See also ==
- Southern Rocky Mountains
- Mountain ranges of Colorado
