= Mount Adams (Colorado) =

Mountain in Colorado, United States of America

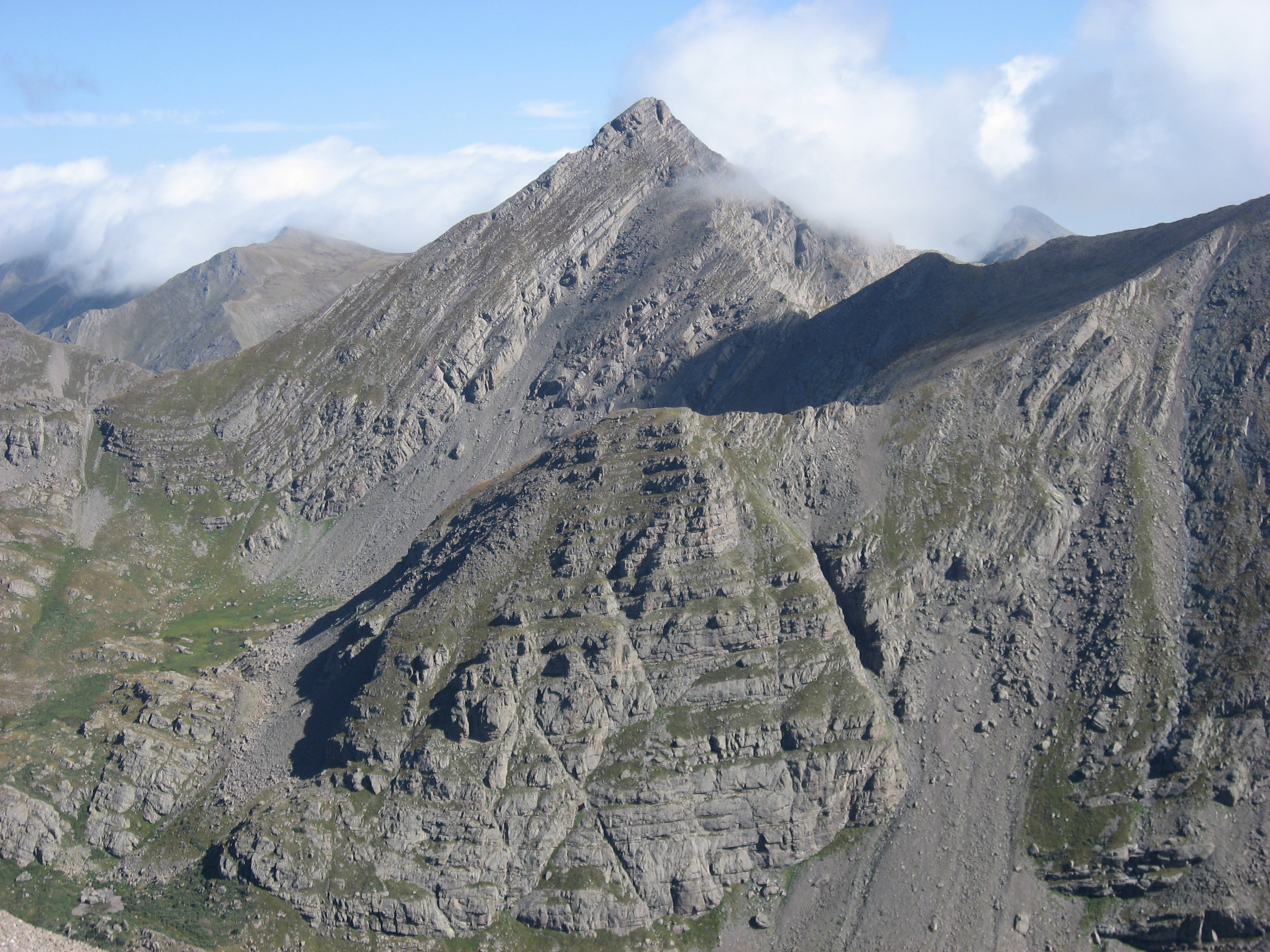
- View of Mount Adams from the south

Highest point
- Elevation: 13,937 ft (4,248 m)
- Prominence: 871 ft (265 m)
- Isolation: 1.86 mi (2.99 km)
- Coordinates: 38°00′27″N 105°36′17″W

Geography
- Location within Colorado
- Location: Custer and Saguache counties, Colorado, United States
- Parent range: Sangre de Cristo Range, Crestones
- Topo map(s): USGS 7.5' topographic map Horn Peak, Colorado

Climbing
- Easiest route: Scramble Class 3

Mount Adams is a high mountain summit of the Crestones in the Sangre de Cristo Range of the Rocky Mountains of North America. The 13,937-foot (4,248 m) thirteener is located in the Sangre de Cristo Wilderness, 5.1 miles (8.2 km) east by north (bearing 81°) of the Town of Crestone, Colorado, United States, on the drainage divide separating San Isabel National Forest and Custer County from Rio Grande National Forest and Saguache County.

== Climbing ==
Mount Adams can be climbed using Class 3 routes via the west ridge (Willow Lake), via the southeast face (Horn Creek Trailhead), or via the north west ridge (North Crestone Lake Trailhead).

== See also ==
- List of Colorado mountain ranges
- List of Colorado mountain summits
  - List of Colorado fourteeners
  - List of Colorado 4000 meter prominent summits
  - List of the most prominent summits of Colorado
- List of Colorado county high points
