= Poncha Pass =

Mountain pass in Colorado, USA

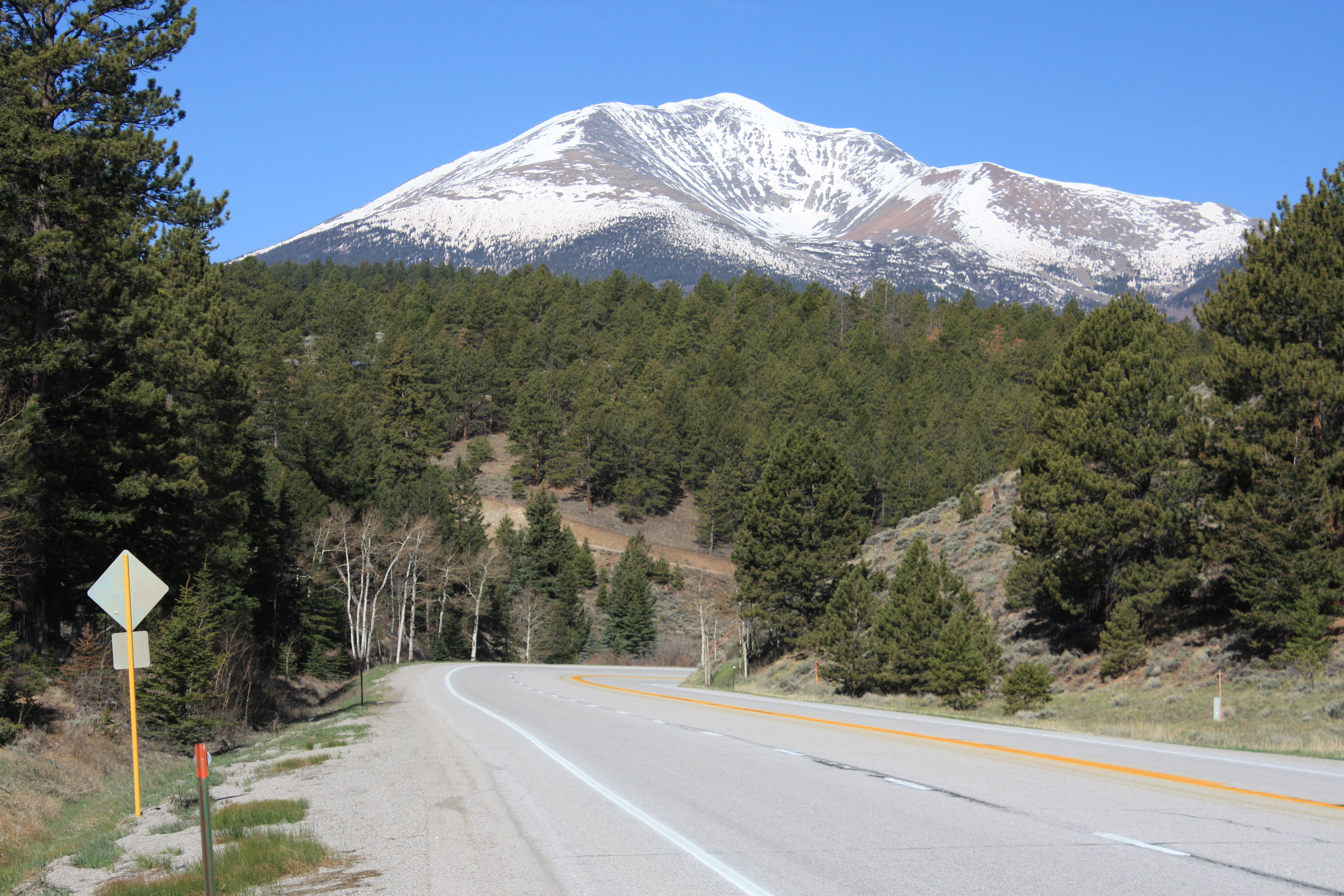
- Looking west at Mount Ouray from the north side of Poncha Pass before the highway curves north.
- Interactive map of Poncha Pass
- Elevation: 9,010 ft (2,750 m)
- Traversed by: US 285

Third Approach
- Location: Chaffee / Saguache counties, Colorado, United States
- Coordinates: 38°25′20″N 106°05′13″W
- Topo map: USGS Poncha Pass

Poncha Pass (9,010 ft; 2,750 m) is a mountain pass in South-Central Colorado (USA). It lies between the San Luis Valley to the south and the valley of the Arkansas River to the north. It is in the saddle between the Sangre de Cristo Range, lying to the southeast, and the Sawatch Range, lying to the west and northwest. The small town of Poncha Springs lies about 6 miles (9.7 km) north of the pass. The pass has a mild approach on the southern side and a moderate 5% approach from the north. It remains open all year round and does not normally cause problems for vehicles in winter.

Poncha Pass lies on the border between Chaffee County and Saguache County, and on the border between the San Isabel National Forest and the Rio Grande National Forest.

== Transport routes ==
- U.S. Highway 285 presently runs over the pass, linking the cities of Alamosa to the south and Salida to the northeast.
- Until 1951, a 3 ft (914 mm) narrow-gauge rail line operated by the Denver & Rio Grand Western Railroad ran over the pass linking Mears Junction to the north with Alamosa to the south.
