= Sangre de Cristo Wilderness =

Wilderness area in Colorado, United States

- IUCN category Ib (wilderness area)
- Location within the United States
- Location: Colorado, United States
- Coordinates: 37°59′18″N 105°36′20″W
- Area: 220,803 acres (893.56 km^{2})
- Established: 1993
- Governing body: U.S. Forest Service, National Park Service

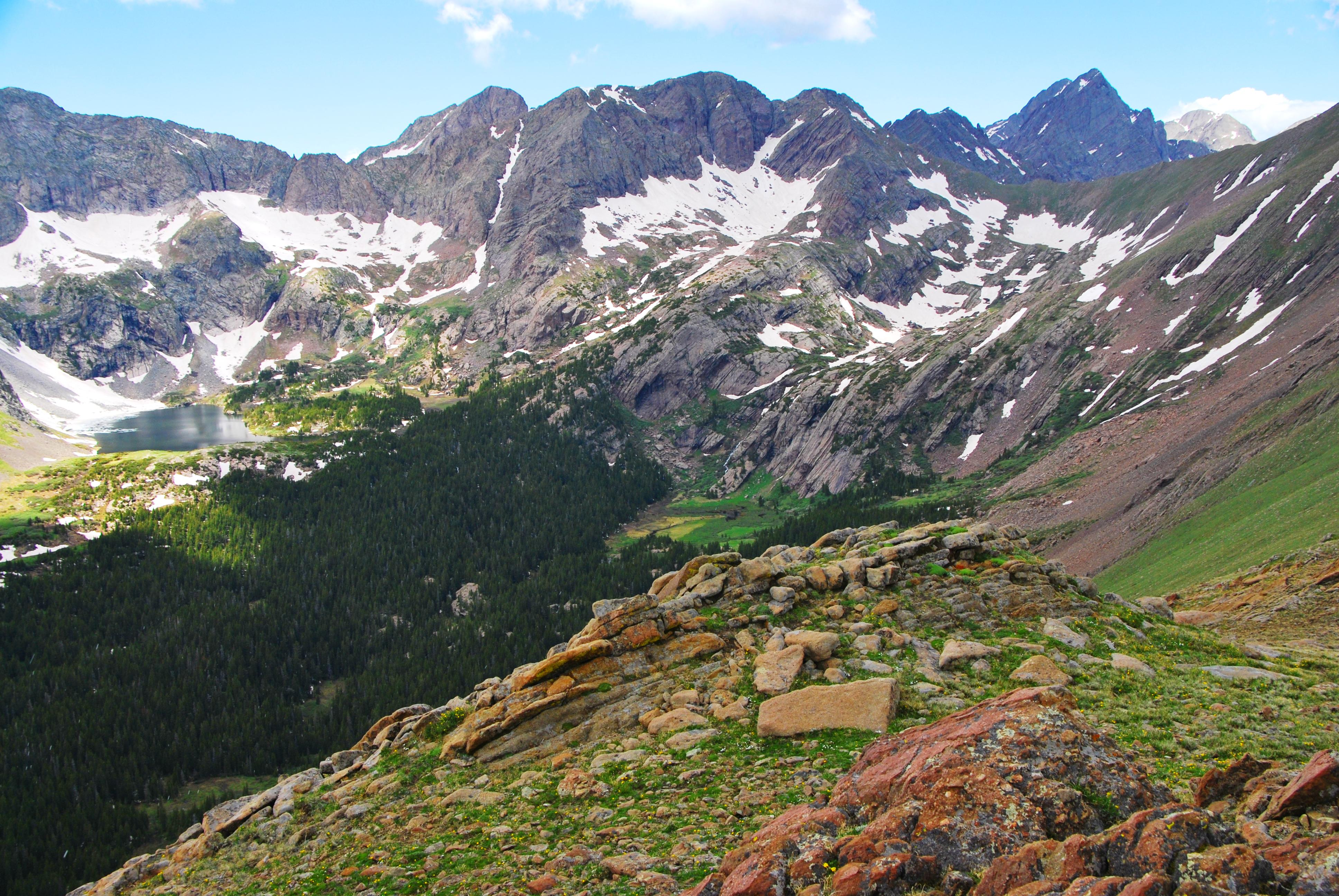
Upper Sand Creek Lake from Great Sand Dunes National Preserve

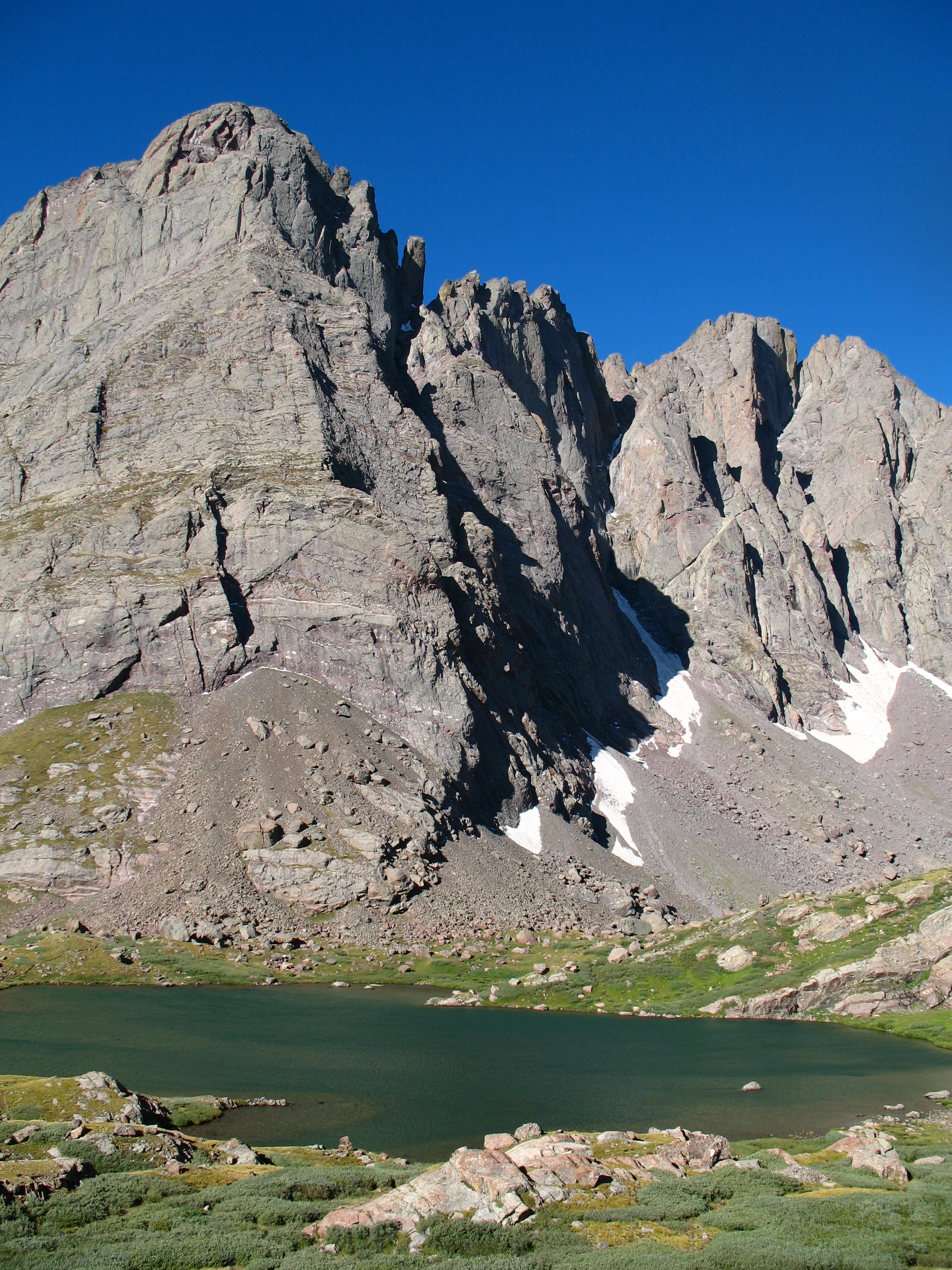
Crestone Needle and lower South Colony Lake.

The Sangre de Cristo Wilderness is about 70 miles (110 km) long from north to south and about 5 miles (8.0 km) wide with an area of 220,803 acres (893.56 km^{2})(345 sq miles). The Wilderness is in the Sangre de Cristo Range centered about Saguache and Custer counties, Colorado. Smaller areas are located in Fremont, Alamosa, and Huerfano counties. The wilderness area is part of the San Isabel and Rio Grande National Forests and Great Sand Dunes National Park and Preserve. The Wilderness embraces both eastern and western slopes of the steep and rugged Sangre de Cristos. Elevations range from about 8,300 ft (2,500 m) to 14,297 ft (4,358 m) at Crestone Peak, the seventh-highest mountain in Colorado.

A wilderness area is defined by law as "an area of undeveloped Federal land retaining its primeval character and influence, without permanent improvements or human habitation, which is protected and managed so as to preserve its natural conditions". All mechanized equipment, including drones, is prohibited in wilderness areas. Hiking and backpacking are the most important recreational activities in the wilderness.

== Description ==
The Spanish language name means "blood of Christ." It is uncertain how the mountains acquired that name. The name dates from the era of Spanish colonization of the region. The U.S. Forest Service describes the Sangre de Cristo Mountains as a "range of dramatic vertical proportions." Four fourteeners (mountains whose elevation exceeds 14,000 feet or 4,300 meters) are within the Wilderness and three more are in close proximity. Crestone Needle, 14,197 ft (4,327 m), is one of Colorado's most challenging peaks for climbers. Both the eastern and western slopes of the Wilderness feature many small snow-fed alpine lakes as the source of rushing streams which cut deep canyons. The Wilderness is split into four sections crossed by three roads passable only by four-wheel drive vehicles during the summer season. The highest peaks are in the southern one-half of the Wilderness.

The flora of the Wilderness is typical of the southern Rocky Mountains. Mid-elevation forests grow in elevations between 8,000 ft (2,400 m) and 9,000 ft (2,700 m). Tree species include ponderosa pine and Douglas fir. Sub-Alpine forests occupy most of the Wilderness, found from 9,000 ft (2,700 m) up to 12,000 ft (3,700 m) with forests of Engelmann spruce, sub-alpine fir and quaking aspen. The alpine zone is found at elevations of more than 11,500 ft (3,500 m) and is treeless, with vegetation consisting of grassy meadows and much exposed rock. Wildlife in the Wilderness includes black bear, cougar, mule deer, elk, and bighorn sheep. Moose are not native to the Wilderness but occasionally wander south into the Sangre de Cristos.

== Recreation ==
The Sangre de Cristo Wilderness has 180 miles (290 km) of hiking trails. Hiking and backpacking are the most common activities of visitors. Most hiking trails are rated "hard" or "difficult" and the destination is often an alpine lake or lakes. Trout of various species are found in the lakes and streams. Noteworthy is the presence of the Rio Grande cutthroat trout in Medano and Sand Creek in the Great Sand Dunes Preserve. Fishing in these two streams is catch and release only as the Rio Grande cutthroat is a species of "special concern" for its survival in Colorado. These two streams disappear into the desert sands of the Great Sand Dunes and their trout are isolated from interbreeding with other trout varieties. Other streams and lakes in the wilderness area have populations of additional cutthroat sub-species, plus introduced rainbow and brook trout. Hunting regulated by the state of Colorado is permitted in the wilderness area
