= Rio Grande National Forest =

National Forest in Colorado, United States

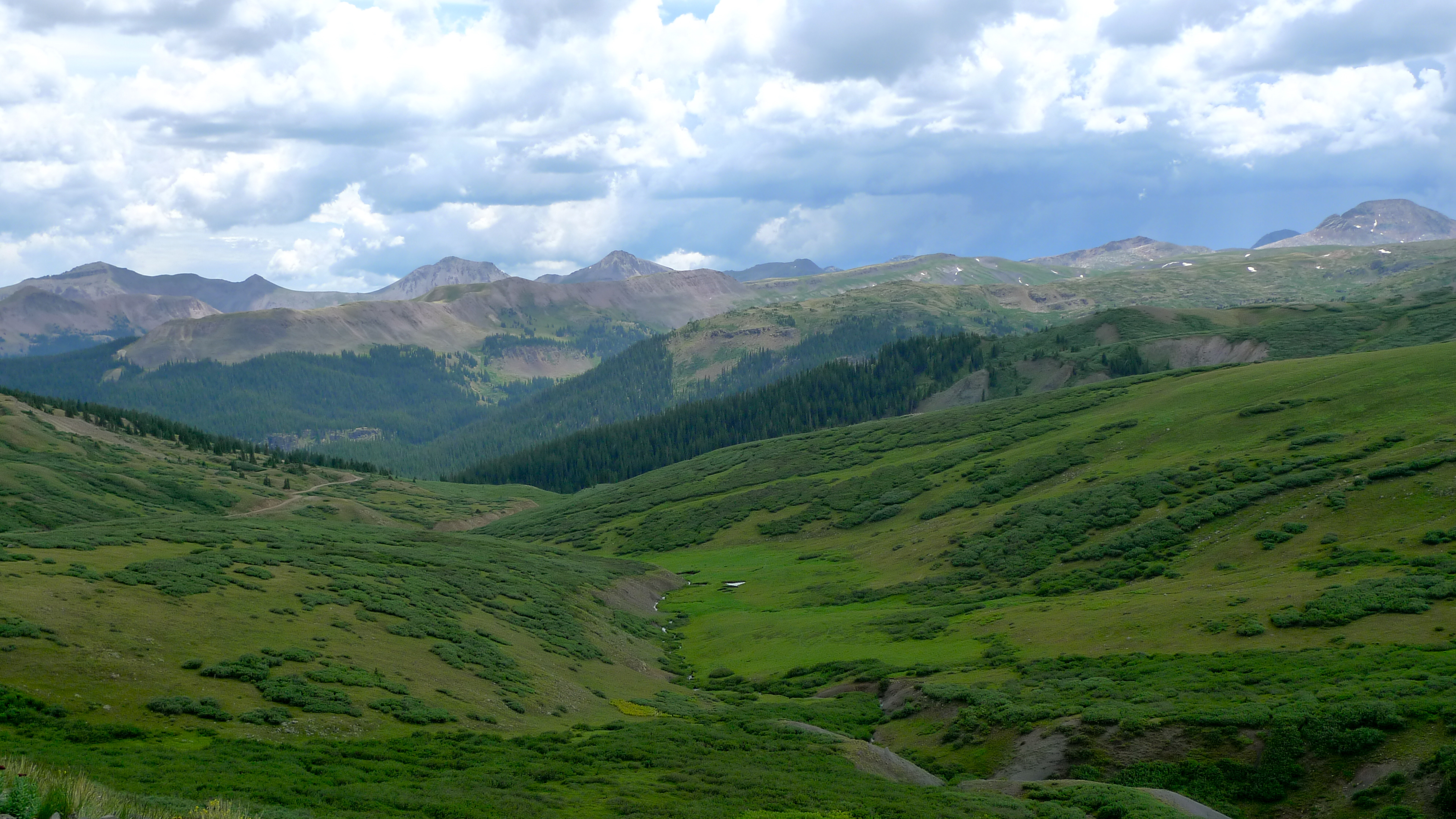
- Stony Pass jeep road, east of Silverton, Colorado, along an old wagon road over Stony Pass (12,588 feet), at the edge of the Weminuche Wilderness
- Interactive map of Rio Grande National Forest
- Location: Colorado, United States
- Nearest city: Alamosa, CO
- Coordinates: 37°44′24″N 106°50′07″W
- Area: 1,860,000 acres (7,500 km^{2})
- Established: July 1, 1908
- Governing body: U.S. Forest Service
- Website: Rio Grande National Forest

Rio Grande National Forest is a 1.86 million-acre (7,530 km^{2}) U.S. national forest located in southwestern Colorado. The forest encompasses the San Luis Valley, which is the world's largest agricultural alpine valley, as well as one of the world's largest high deserts located around mountains. The Rio Grande rises in the forest, and the Continental Divide runs along most of its western border. The forest lies in parts of nine counties. In descending order of land area within the forest they are Saguache, Mineral, Conejos, Rio Grande, Hinsdale, San Juan, Alamosa, Archuleta, and Custer counties. Forest headquarters are currently located in Del Norte, Colorado. There are local ranger district offices in Del Norte, La Jara, and Saguache.

== Wilderness areas ==
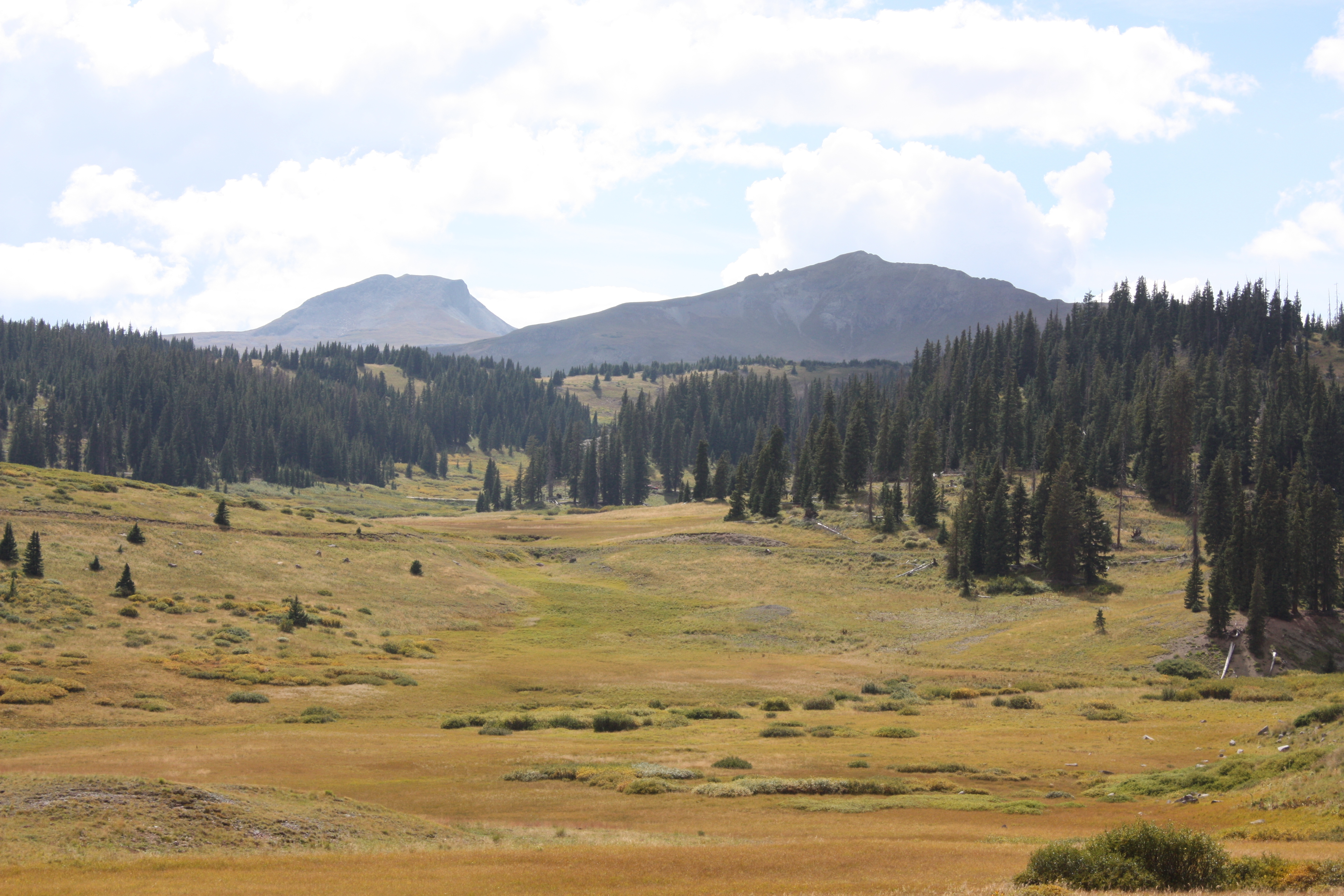
Mountains in Rio Grande National Forest in September 2013

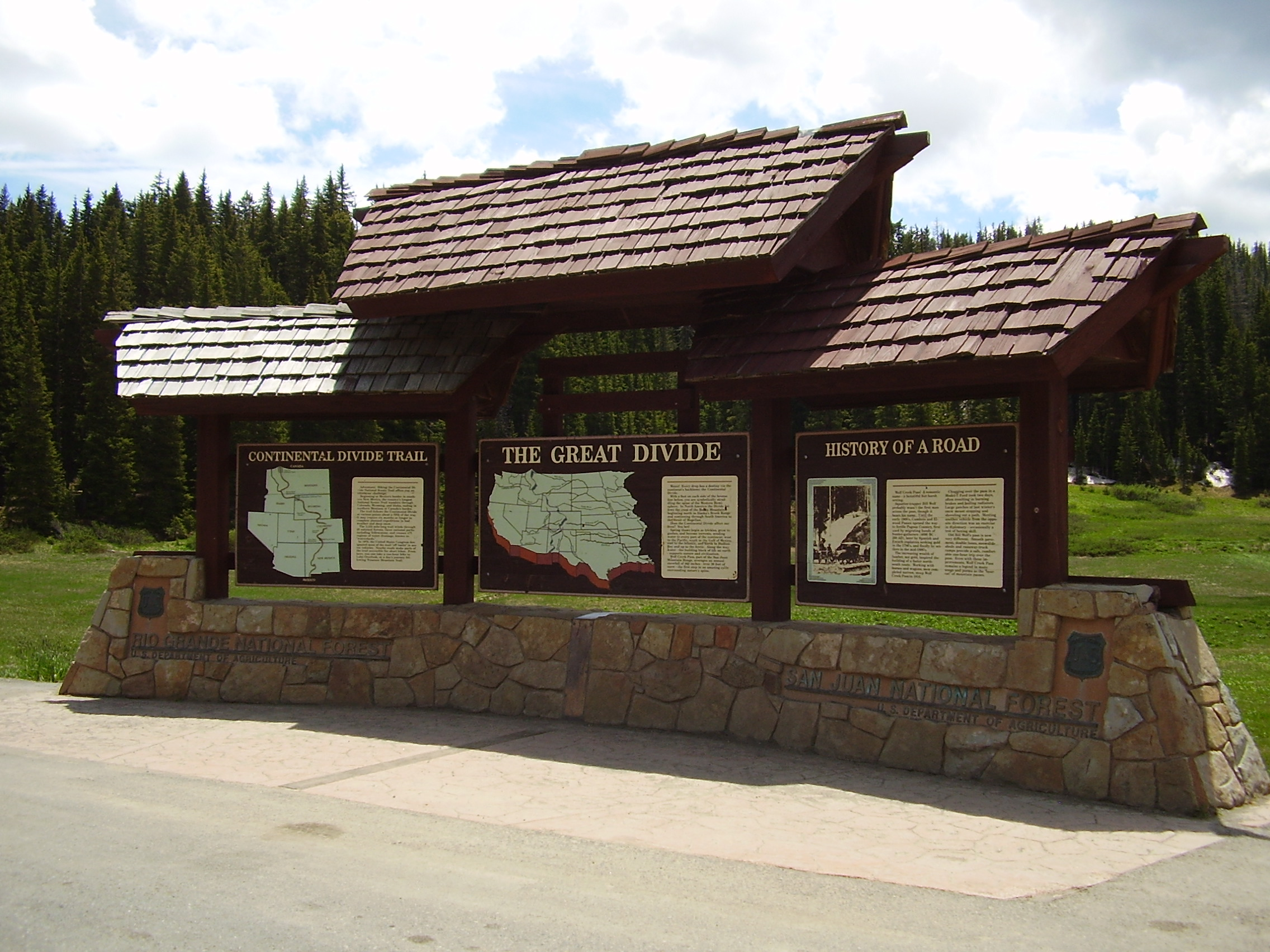
The Continental Divide of the Americas separates the Rio Grande National Forest and the San Juan National Forest.

There are four officially designated wilderness areas lying within Rio Grande National Forest that are part of the National Wilderness Preservation System. All of them extend partially into neighboring National Forests, and one of these also onto National Park Service land (as indicated).

- La Garita Wilderness (mostly in Gunnison NF)
- Sangre de Cristo Wilderness (the largest part in San Isabel NF; also partly in Great Sand Dunes National Park and Preserve)
- South San Juan Wilderness (partly in San Juan NF)
- Weminuche Wilderness (mostly in San Juan NF)

== Climate ==
According to the Köppen Climate Classification system, Rio Grande Reservoir has a warm-summer humid continental climate, abbreviated "Dfb" on climate maps. The hottest temperature recorded at Rio Grande Reservoir was 89 °F (31.7 °C) on July 6, 1989 and July 14, 2003, while the coldest temperature recorded was −46 °F (−43.3 °C) on December 8, 1978.

Climate data for Rio Grande Reservoir, Colorado, 1991–2020 normals, extremes 1977–2022
Month	Jan	Feb	Mar	Apr	May	Jun	Jul	Aug	Sep	Oct	Nov	Dec	Year
Record high °F (°C)	56 (13)	58 (14)	65 (18)	71 (22)	82 (28)	87 (31)	89 (32)	87 (31)	84 (29)	84 (29)	66 (19)	60 (16)	89 (32)
Mean maximum °F (°C)	46.6 (8.1)	50.1 (10.1)	56.6 (13.7)	63.6 (17.6)	72.1 (22.3)	80.7 (27.1)	84.2 (29.0)	81.4 (27.4)	78.4 (25.8)	71.8 (22.1)	58.3 (14.6)	47.9 (8.8)	84.9 (29.4)
Mean daily maximum °F (°C)	34.4 (1.3)	36.5 (2.5)	42.9 (6.1)	49.8 (9.9)	59.9 (15.5)	70.8 (21.6)	75.6 (24.2)	73.2 (22.9)	68.0 (20.0)	57.6 (14.2)	43.9 (6.6)	33.8 (1.0)	53.9 (12.1)
Daily mean °F (°C)	15.2 (−9.3)	17.3 (−8.2)	25.8 (−3.4)	34.8 (1.6)	44.7 (7.1)	53.4 (11.9)	59.0 (15.0)	57.0 (13.9)	51.3 (10.7)	41.5 (5.3)	27.9 (−2.3)	15.4 (−9.2)	36.9 (2.8)
Mean daily minimum °F (°C)	−4.0 (−20.0)	−2.0 (−18.9)	8.6 (−13.0)	19.8 (−6.8)	29.5 (−1.4)	36.1 (2.3)	42.4 (5.8)	40.9 (4.9)	34.6 (1.4)	25.4 (−3.7)	11.8 (−11.2)	−2.9 (−19.4)	20.0 (−6.7)
Mean minimum °F (°C)	−22.7 (−30.4)	−19.2 (−28.4)	−10.5 (−23.6)	3.7 (−15.7)	18.1 (−7.7)	28.0 (−2.2)	35.2 (1.8)	33.5 (0.8)	23.2 (−4.9)	11.2 (−11.6)	−5.8 (−21.0)	−20.1 (−28.9)	−25.4 (−31.9)
Record low °F (°C)	−42 (−41)	−40 (−40)	−31 (−35)	−28 (−33)	0 (−18)	14 (−10)	24 (−4)	19 (−7)	10 (−12)	−4 (−20)	−24 (−31)	−46 (−43)	−46 (−43)
Average precipitation inches (mm)	1.22 (31)	1.36 (35)	1.37 (35)	1.33 (34)	1.12 (28)	0.84 (21)	2.21 (56)	2.93 (74)	2.49 (63)	2.20 (56)	1.38 (35)	1.15 (29)	19.60 (498)
Average snowfall inches (cm)	19.3 (49)	18.8 (48)	15.3 (39)	14.5 (37)	3.7 (9.4)	0.0 (0.0)	0.0 (0.0)	0.2 (0.51)	0.5 (1.3)	7.7 (20)	15.1 (38)	12.6 (32)	107.7 (274.21)
Average extreme snow depth inches (cm)	18.3 (46)	18.7 (47)	15.7 (40)	10.0 (25)	2.5 (6.4)	0.0 (0.0)	0.0 (0.0)	0.0 (0.0)	0.4 (1.0)	3.8 (9.7)	9.3 (24)	14.2 (36)	25.8 (66)
Average precipitation days (≥ 0.01 in)	3.8	4.9	5.1	6.4	5.7	4.2	11.0	13.1	9.0	6.1	4.3	3.7	77.3
Average snowy days (≥ 0.1 in)	3.3	4.8	3.8	5.3	1.3	0.0	0.0	0.0	0.1	2.2	3.5	3.3	27.6
Source 1: NOAA
Source 2: National Weather Service

== See also ==
- List of national forests of the United States
