= Thirteener =

Mountain that exceeds 13,000 feet

In mountaineering in the United States, a thirteener (abbreviated 13er) is a mountain that exceeds 13,000 feet (3,962.4 m) above mean sea level, similar to the more familiar "fourteeners," which exceed 14,000 feet (4,267.2 m). In most instances, "thirteeners" refers only to those peaks between 13,000 and 13,999 feet in elevation.

The importance of thirteeners is greatest in Colorado, which has the majority of such peaks in North America with over 600 of them. Despite the large number of peaks, over 20 peak baggers have reported climbing all of Colorado's thirteeners. Thirteeners are also significant in states whose highpoints fall between 13,000 and 13,999 feet. For example, the Wyoming thirteeners are the highest peaks within the state, and only 5 individuals have reported climbing all 35 peaks, likely due to a combination of technical difficulty and remoteness. In 2019, Teresa Gergen became the first person to summit all 846 thirteeners outside of Alaska, an accomplishment that took her nearly two decades to complete.

Not all summits over 13,000 feet qualify as thirteeners, but only those summits that mountaineers consider to be independent. Objective standards for independence include topographic prominence and isolation (distance from a higher summit), or a combination. However thirteener lists do not always consistently use such objective rules. A rule commonly used by mountaineers in the contiguous United States is that a peak must have at least 300 feet (91 m) of prominence to qualify. According to the Mountaineering Club of Alaska, it is standard in Alaska to use a 500 ft (152 m) prominence rule rather than a 300-foot rule. These are the standards applied for the lists below. Regarding whether or not peaks in excess of 13,999 feet should be considered as "thirteeners", this article will count them as such for statistical purposes, but concentrate its focus on those peaks less than 14,000 feet since the higher peaks are already covered in the fourteeners list.

== List of United States thirteeners by state ==
Thirteeners are found in nine U.S. states. This table summarizes their numbers based on each state's prominence criteria:

U.S. State	Thirteeners	Fourteeners	Highest 13er < 14,000 ft	Elevation
Colorado	637	53	Grizzly Peak	13,988 ft (4,264 m)
California	149	12	Mount Barnard	13,990 ft (4,264 m)
Alaska	41	20	Mount Hunter, South Peak	13,966 ft (4,257 m)
Wyoming	35	0	Gannett Peak	13,804 ft (4,207 m)
Utah	17	0	Kings Peak	13,528 ft (4,123 m)
New Mexico	3	0	Wheeler Peak	13,161 ft (4,011 m)
Hawaii	2	0	Mauna Kea	13,796 ft (4,205 m)
Nevada	2	0	Boundary Peak	13,140 ft (4,005 m)
Washington	0	1	none	-

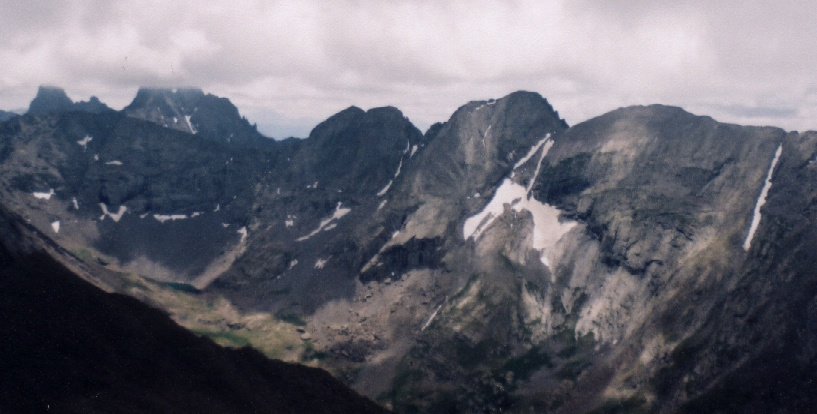
The Crestone Group including Columbia Point, Colorado

=== Colorado ===
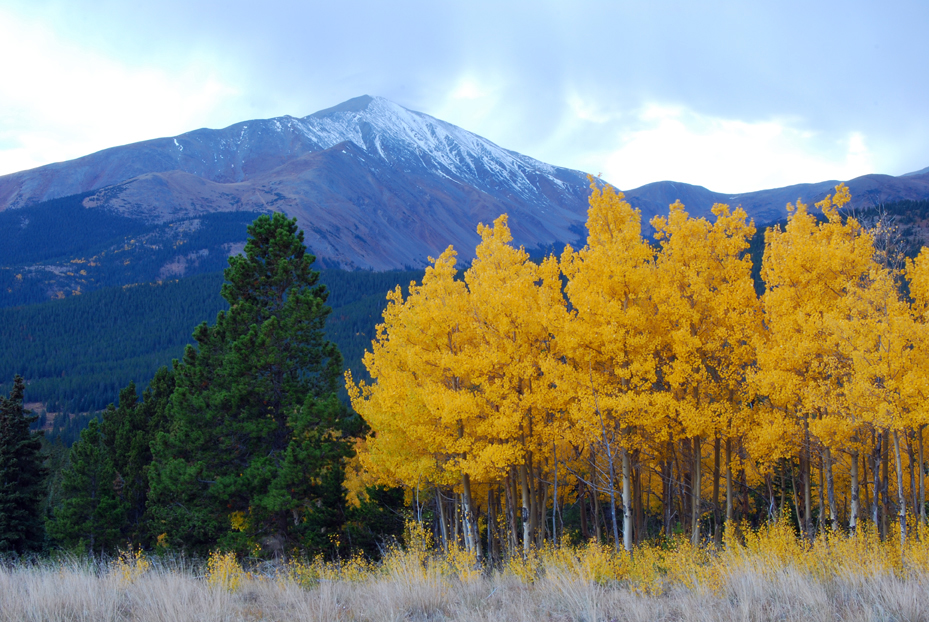
Mount Silverheels, Colorado

By the most detailed count, Colorado has 637 peaks that exceed 13,000 feet (4,000 m) and meet the prominence criteria, of which 53 are fourteeners. The highest of them less than 14,000 feet are as follows (the rank includes higher peaks):

Rank	Mountain	Elevation	Range
54	Grizzly Peak	13,988 ft (4,264 m)	Sawatch Range
55	Stewart Peak	13,983 ft (4,262 m)	San Juan Mountains
56	Columbia Point	13,980 ft (4,261 m)	Sangre de Cristo Range
57	Pigeon Peak	13,972 ft (4,259 m)	San Juan Mountains
58	Mount Ouray	13,971 ft (4,258 m)	Sawatch Range
59	Ice Mountain	13,951 ft (4,252 m)	Sawatch Range
60	Fletcher Mountain	13,951 ft (4,252 m)	Tenmile Range
61	Pacific Peak	13,950 ft (4,252 m)	Tenmile Range

Grizzly Peak is not only the name of Colorado's highest thirteener, but the state has four other Grizzly Peaks plus one Grizzly Mountain on the list:

Rank	Mountain	Elevation	Range
130	Grizzly Peak	13,738 ft (4,187 m)	San Juan Mountains
142	Grizzly Mountain	13,708 ft (4,178 m)	Sawatch Range
145	Grizzly Peak	13,700 ft (4,176 m)	San Juan Mountains
302	Grizzly Peak	13,427 ft (4,093 m)	Front Range
415	Grizzly Peak	13,281 ft (4,048 m)	Sawatch Range

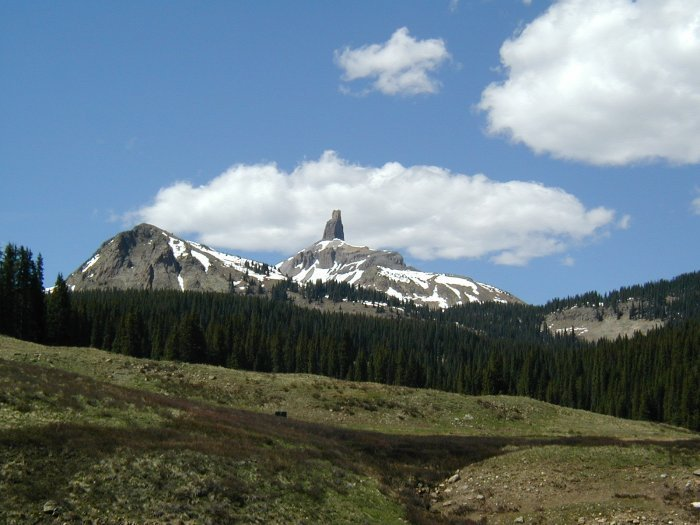
Lizard Head, Colorado

Other notable Colorado thirteeners include:

Rank	Mountain	Elevation	Range
66	Mount Adams	13,931 ft (4,246 m)	Sangre de Cristo Range
68	Mount Meeker	13,911 ft (4,240 m)	Front Range
82	Crystal Peak	13,852 ft (4,222 m)	Tenmile Range
89	Turret Peak	13,835 ft (4,217 m)	Needle Mountains
96	Mount Silverheels	13,822 ft (4,213 m)	Mosquito Range
131	Argentine Peak	13,738 ft (4,187 m)	Tenmile Range
253	North Arapaho Peak	13,502 ft (4,115 m)	Front Range
304	Mummy Mountain	13,425 ft (4,092 m)	Mummy Range
324	Parry Peak	13,391 ft (4,082 m)	Front Range
451	Hesperus Mountain	13,232 ft (4,033 m)	San Juan Mountains
515	Twilight Peak	13,158 ft (4,011 m)	San Juan Mountains
556	Lizard Head	13,113 ft (3,997 m)	San Juan Mountains

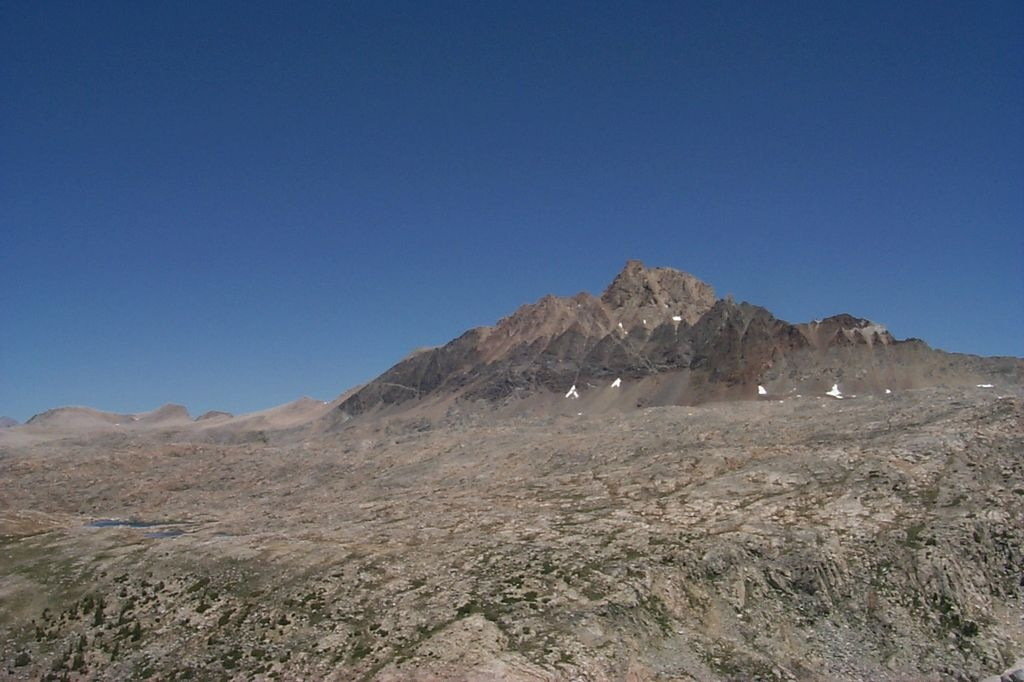
Mount Humphreys, California

=== California ===
California has the second greatest number of thirteeners with 149 of them, of which 12 are fourteeners. The highest under 14,000 feet are as follows (the rank includes higher peaks):

Rank	Mountain	Elevation	Range
13	Mount Barnard	13,990 ft (4,264 m)	Sierra Nevada
14	Mount Humphreys	13,986 ft (4,263 m)	Sierra Nevada
15	Mount Keith	13,975 ft (4,260 m)	Sierra Nevada
16	Mount Stanford	13,973 ft (4,259 m)	Sierra Nevada

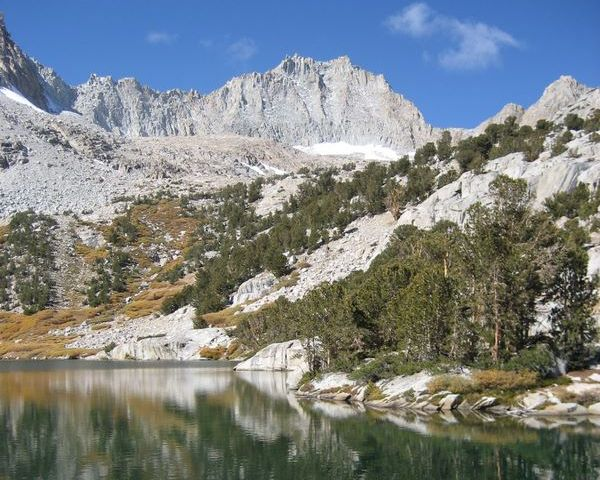
Mount Darwin, California

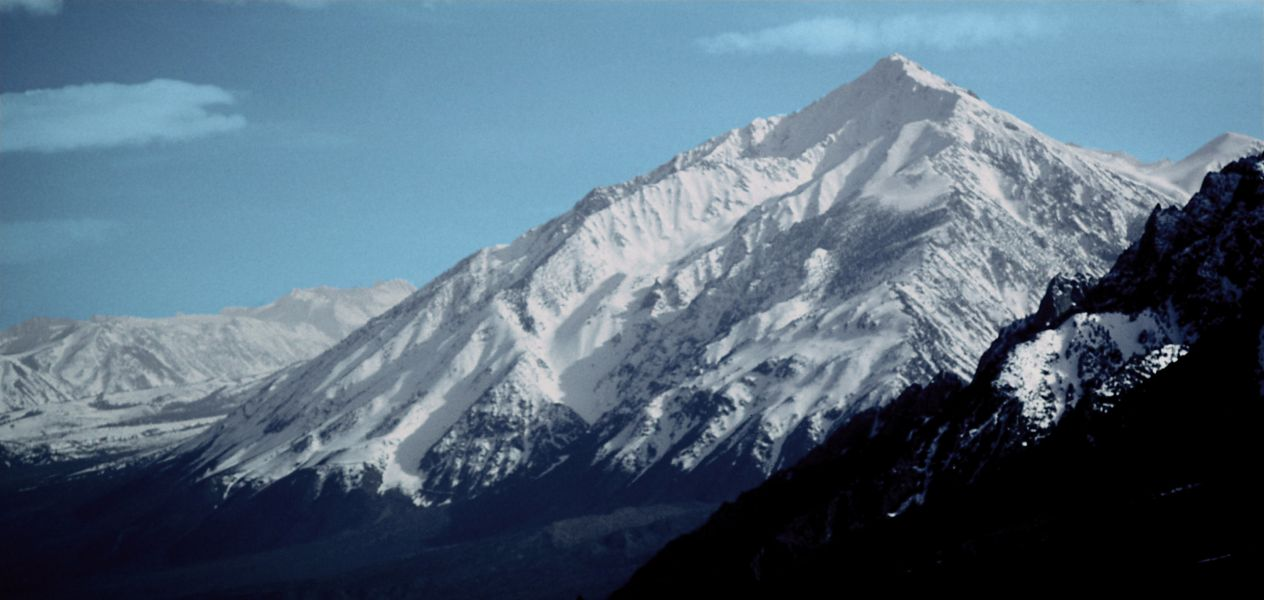
Mount Tom, California

Other notable California thirteeners include:

Rank	Mountain	Elevation	Range
19	Mount Le Conte	13,930 ft (4,246 m)	Sierra Nevada
21	Mount Agassiz	13,893 ft (4,235 m)	Sierra Nevada
23	Norman Clyde Peak	13,861 ft (4,225 m)	Sierra Nevada
26	Mount Darwin	13,831 ft (4,216 m)	Sierra Nevada
27	Mount Kaweah	13,802 ft (4,207 m)	Sierra Nevada
29	Mount Winchell	13,775 ft (4,199 m)	Sierra Nevada
30	Mount Morgan (Inyo County)	13,748 ft (4,190 m)	Sierra Nevada
33	Red Kaweah	13,720 ft (4,182 m)	Sierra Nevada
38	Black Kaweah	13,680 ft (4,170 m)	Sierra Nevada
39	Mount Tom	13,652 ft (4,161 m)	Sierra Nevada
46	Birch Mountain	13,602 ft (4,146 m)	Sierra Nevada
53	Palisade Crest	13,553 ft (4,131 m)	Sierra Nevada
69	Montgomery Peak	13,441 ft (4,097 m)	White Mountains
76	Kaweah Queen	13,382 ft (4,079 m)	Sierra Nevada
120	Red Slate Mountain	13,163 ft (4,012 m)	Sierra Nevada
122	Mount Ritter	13,140 ft (4,005 m)	Sierra Nevada
123	Mount Baxter	13,140 ft (4,005 m)	Sierra Nevada
126	Mount Lyell	13,114 ft (3,997 m)	Sierra Nevada
137	Mount Dana	13,057 ft (3,980 m)	Sierra Nevada
149	Mount Morgan (Mono County)	13,001 ft (3,963 m)	Sierra Nevada

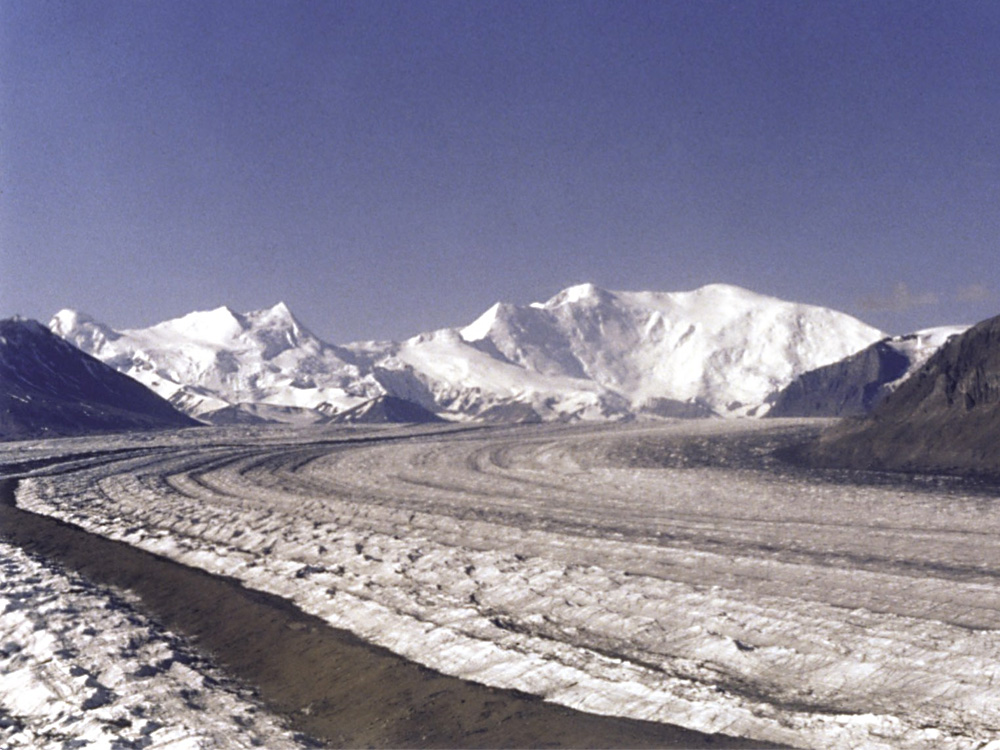
Parka Peak, Atna Peaks, and Mount Blackburn, Alaska

=== Alaska ===
Alaska has at least 41 thirteeners that meet its more stringent prominence criteria of 500 ft, of which 20 are also fourteeners. Different sources list varying numbers of 13,000+ ft peaks in the state, mainly because many of the peaks (especially those that are sub-peaks of a higher mountain) are unnamed and have no spot elevations given on the USGS topographical maps. Using a 300' interpolated prominence criterion, there are 61 13,000+ ft peaks in Alaska. The following list may miss a few peaks that should be included:

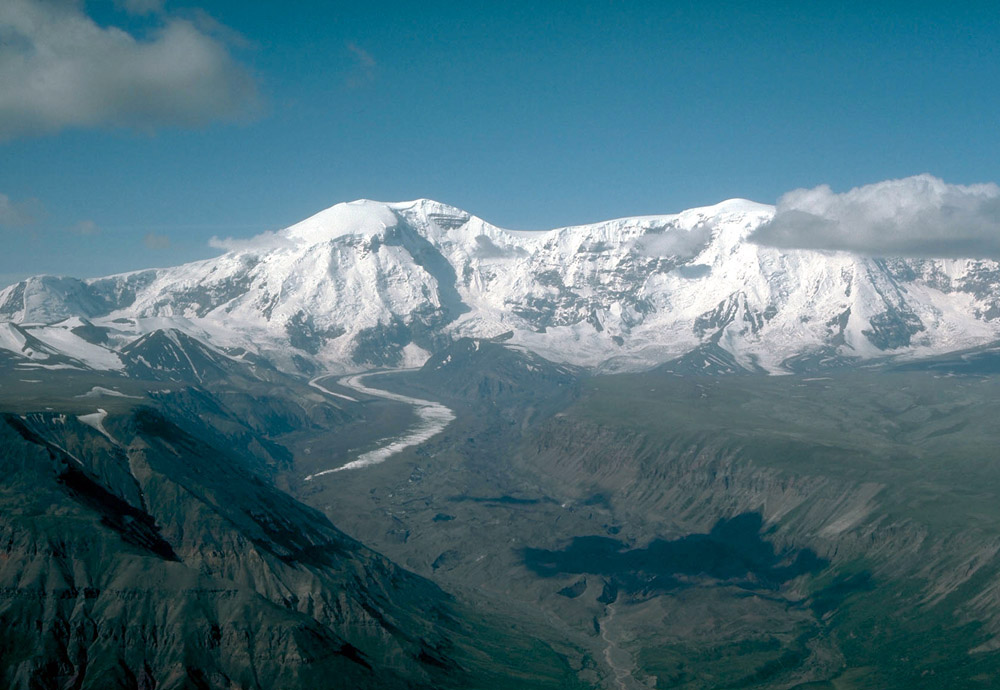
Mount Jarvis (north and main peaks), Alaska

Rank	Mountain	Elevation	Range
21	Mount Hunter, South Peak	13,966 ft (4,257 m)	Alaska Range
22	Atna Peaks	13,860 ft (4,225 m)	Wrangell Mountains
23	Regal Mountain	13,845 ft (4,220 m)	Wrangell Mountains
24	Mount Hayes	13,832 ft (4,216 m)	Alaska Range
25	Mount Cook	13,760 ft (4,194 m)	Saint Elias Mountains
26	Mount Sanford, South Peak	13,654 ft (4,162 m)	Wrangell Mountains
27	Mount Quincy Adams	13,615 ft (4,150 m)	Fairweather Range
28	Ocypete Peak	13,550 ft (4,130 m)	Saint Elias Mountains
29	East Kahiltna Peak	13,440 ft (4,097 m)	Alaska Range
30	Mount Natazhat	13,435 ft (4,095 m)	Saint Elias Mountains
31	Mount Jarvis	13,421 ft (4,091 m)	Wrangell Mountains
32	Mount Hunter, Middle Peak	13,400 ft (4,084 m) +	Alaska Range
33	Mount Bona, East Peak (Tressider Peak)	13,315 ft (4,058 m)	Saint Elias Mountains
34	Mount Hayes, South Peak	13,305 ft (4,055 m)	Alaska Range
35	Celeno Peak	13,300 ft (4,054 m) +	Saint Elias Mountains
36	Parka Peak	13,280 ft (4,048 m)	Wrangell Mountains
37	Mount Silverthrone	13,220 ft (4,029 m)	Alaska Range
38	Mount Marcus Baker	13,176 ft (4,016 m)	Chugach Mountains
39	Mount Jarvis, North Peak	13,025 ft (3,970 m)	Wrangell Mountains
40	Mount Moffit	13,020 ft (3,968 m)	Alaska Range
41	Mount Zanetti	13,009 ft (3,965 m)	Wrangell Mountains

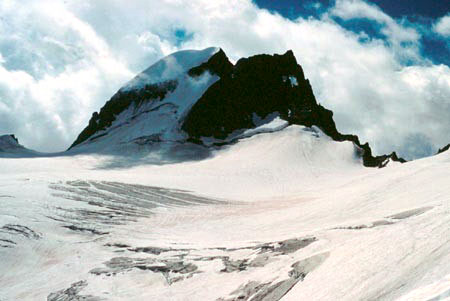
Gannett Peak, Wyoming

=== Wyoming ===
Wyoming has 35 thirteeners with at least 300 ft of interpolated prominence, but no fourteeners. 31 of the 35 are located in the rugged and remote Wind River Range. Several of the Wyoming thirteeners require glacier travel and/or rock climbing up to the 5.4 YDS difficulty level to reach the summit, and most climbers spend multiple days backpacking to reach most of these peaks. The highest of them are:

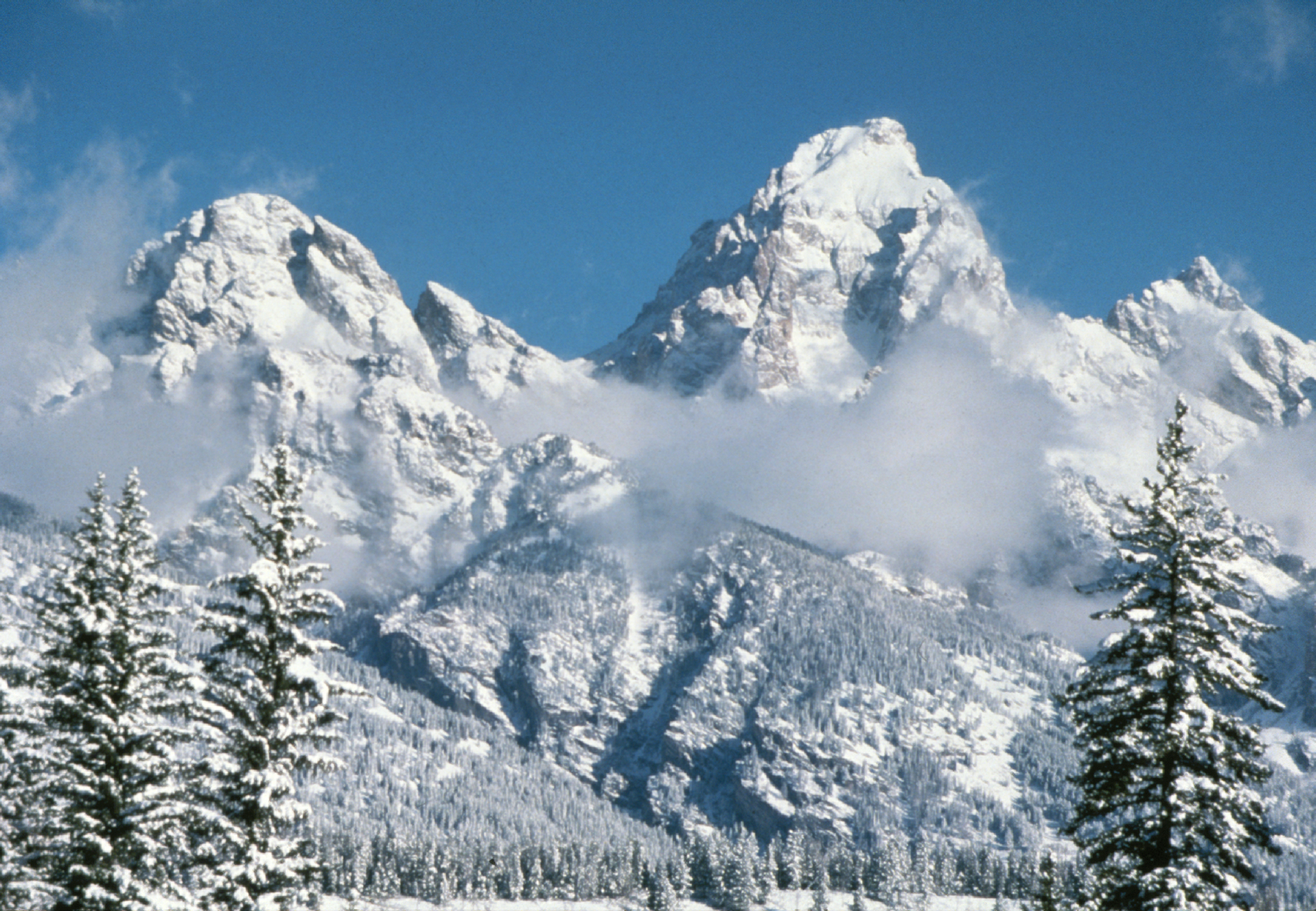
Grand Teton, Wyoming

Rank	Mountain	Elevation	Range
1	Gannett Peak	13,804 ft (4,207 m)	Wind River Range
2	Grand Teton	13,770 ft (4,197 m)	Teton Range
3	Fremont Peak	13,745 ft (4,189 m)	Wind River Range
4	Mount Warren	13,722 ft (4,182 m)	Wind River Range
5	Mount Helen	13,620 ft (4,151 m)	Wind River Range
6	Turret Peak	13,620 ft (4,151 m)	Wind River Range
7	Mount Sacagawea	13,569 ft (4,136 m)	Wind River Range
8	Jackson Peak	13,517 ft (4,120 m)	Wind River Range
9	Mount Woodrow Wilson	13,502 ft (4,115 m)	Wind River Range
10	Bastion Peak	13,494 ft (4,113 m)	Wind River Range
11	Mount Febbas	13,468 ft (4,105 m)	Wind River Range
12	Flagstone Peak	13,450 ft (4,100 m)	Wind River Range
13	Sunbeam Peak	13,440 ft (4,097 m)	Wind River Range
14	Pinnacle Ridge	13,365 ft (4,074 m)	Wind River Range
15	Downs Mountain	13,349 ft (4,069 m)	Wind River Range

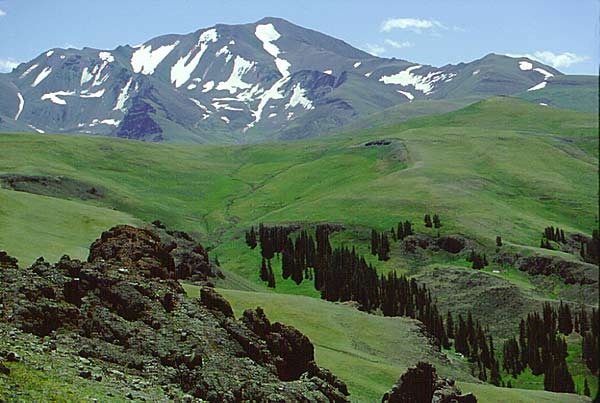
Francs Peak, Wyoming

Other notable Wyoming thirteeners include:

Rank	Mountain	Elevation	Range
20	Wind River Peak	13,192 ft (4,021 m)	Wind River Range
23	Cloud Peak	13,167 ft (4,013 m)	Big Horn Mountains
26	Francs Peak	13,153 ft (4,009 m)	Absaroka Range
33	Black Tooth Mountain	13,005 ft (3,964 m)	Big Horn Mountains

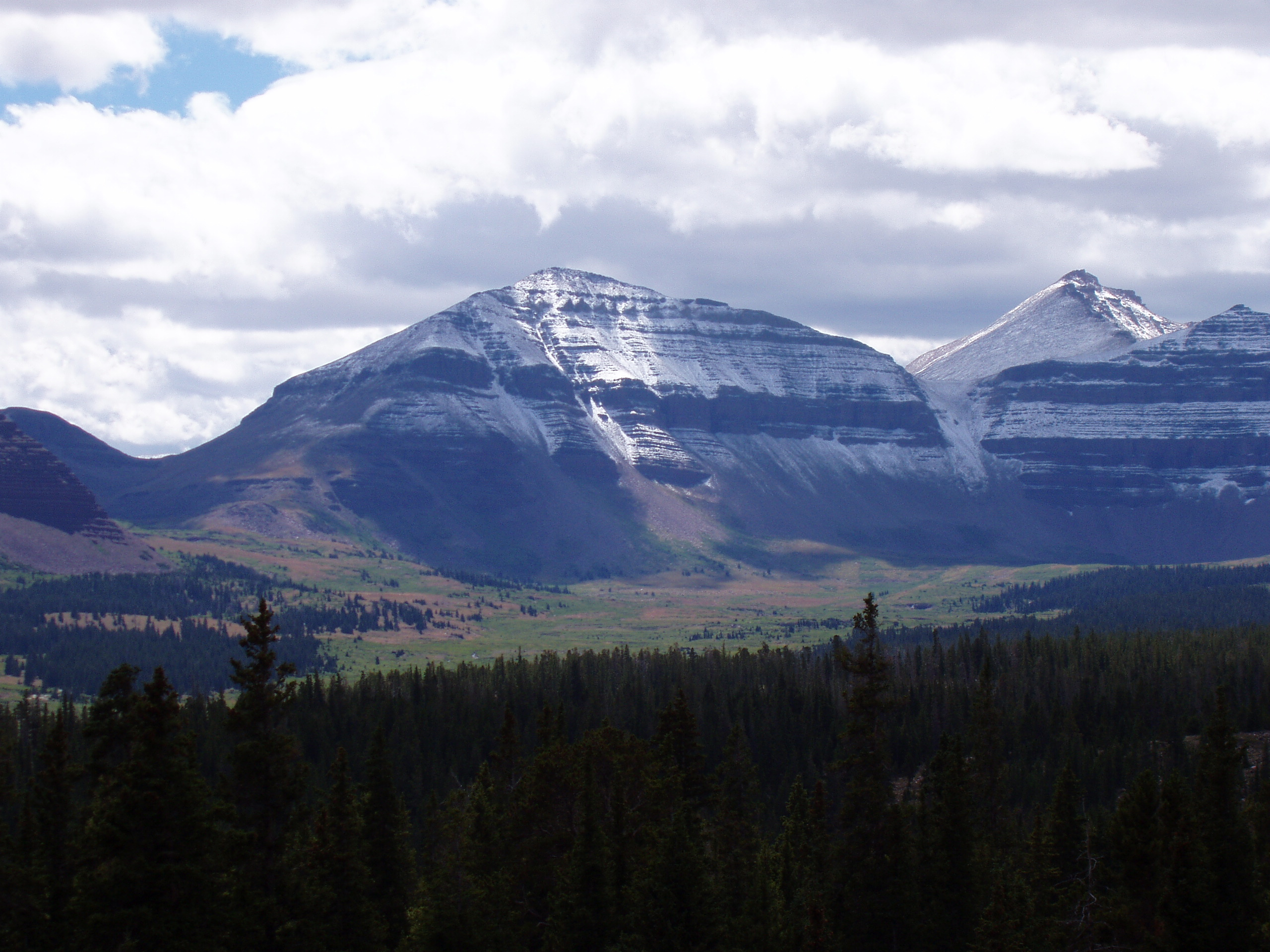
Kings Peak, Utah

=== Utah ===
Utah has 17 thirteeners with at least 300 ft of prominence, but no fourteeners. All of them are located in the remote Uinta Mountains near the Wyoming border. The highest of the thirteeners are:

Rank	Mountain	Elevation	Range
1	Kings Peak	13,528 ft (4,123 m)	Uinta Mountains
2	South Kings Peak	13,512 ft (4,118 m)	Uinta Mountains
3	Gilbert Peak	13,442 ft (4,097 m)	Uinta Mountains
4	Mount Emmons	13,440 ft (4,097 m)	Uinta Mountains

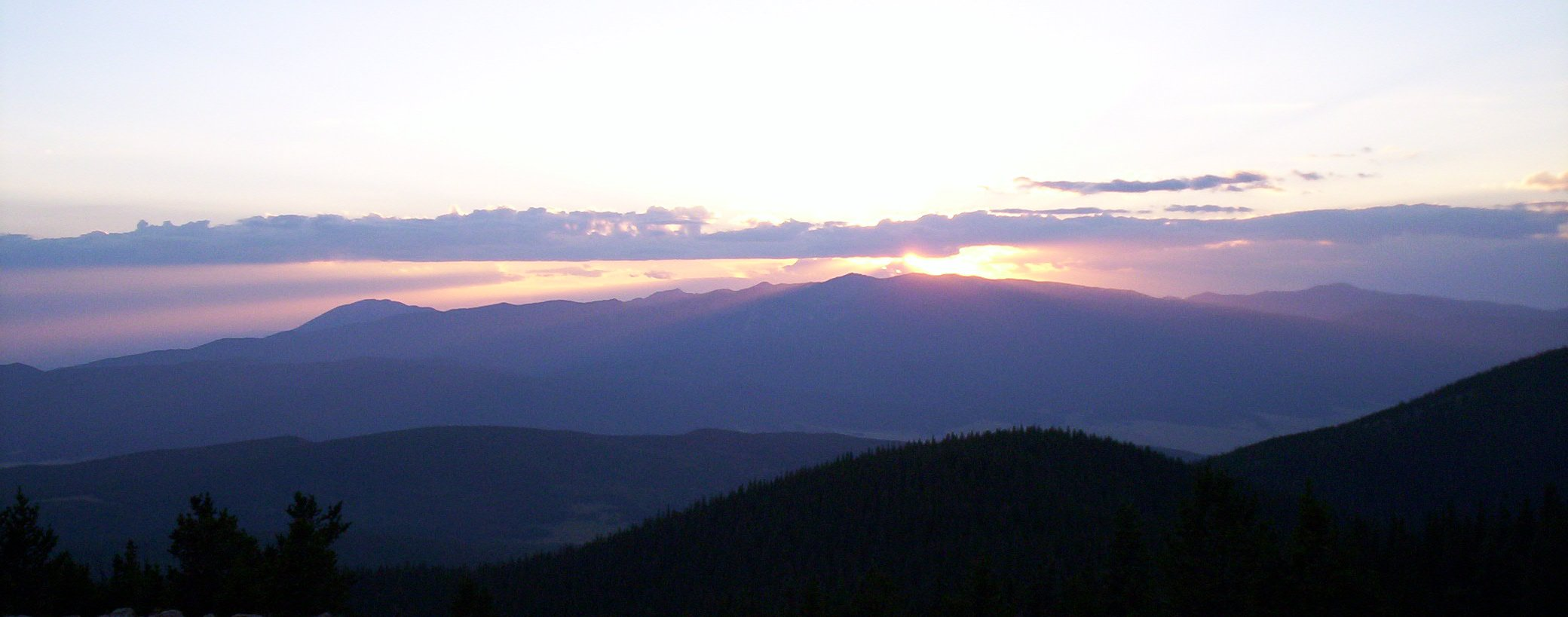
Wheeler Peak, New Mexico

=== New Mexico ===
New Mexico has 3 thirteeners, all located within about 40 miles (64 km) of each other in the Sangre de Cristo Mountains.

Rank	Mountain	Elevation	Range
1	Wheeler Peak	13,161 ft (4,011 m)	Sangre de Cristo Mountains
2	Truchas Peak	13,102 ft (3,993 m)	Sangre de Cristo Mountains
3	North Truchas Peak	13,024 ft (3,970 m)	Sangre de Cristo Mountains

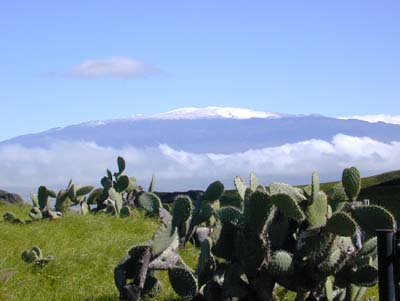
Mauna Kea, Hawaii

=== Hawaii ===
Hawaii has two thirteeners, the great shield volcanoes which comprise the bulk of the Big Island of Hawaii.

Rank	Mountain	Elevation	Range
1	Mauna Kea	13,796 ft (4,205 m)	Island of Hawaii
2	Mauna Loa	13,680 ft (4,170 m)	Island of Hawaii

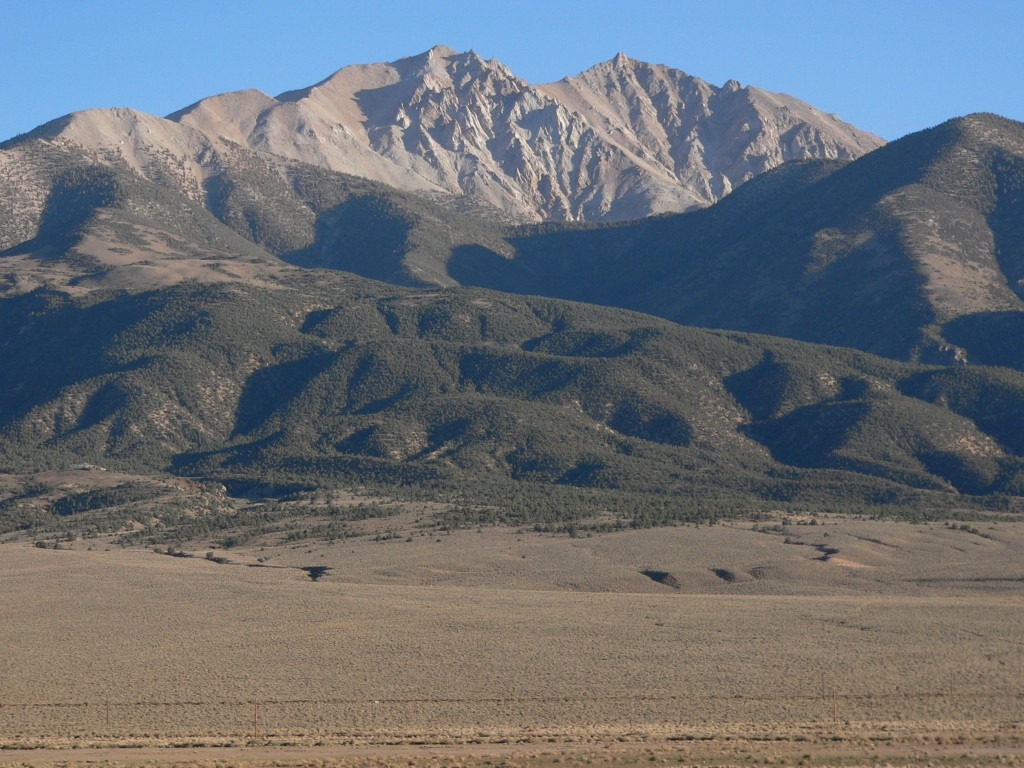
Boundary Peak, Nevada

=== Nevada ===
Nevada has only a single thirteener that meets the threshold for inclusion, Wheeler Peak in Great Basin National Park with an impressive 7,568 feet (2,307 m) of prominence. However, the highest point in the state is Boundary Peak, which is a sub-peak of California's Montgomery Peak with only 240 feet (73 m) of prominence.

Mountain	Elevation	Range
Boundary Peak	13,140 ft (4,005 m)	White Mountains
Wheeler Peak	13,065 ft (3,982 m)	Snake Range

=== Washington ===
Mount Rainier is the only mountain in Washington state that exceeds 13,000 feet (4,000 m), and it has two summits that meet the prominence criteria, both of which are included on the list of fourteeners.

== See also ==
- Outline of the United States
- Index of United States-related articles
- Fourteener
- Mountain peaks of Alaska
- Mountain peaks of California
- Mountain peaks of Colorado
- Mountain peaks of the Rocky Mountains
- Mountain peaks of the United States
