= Turret Peak =

Turret Peak may refer to:

- Turret Peak (Antarctica) in Antarctica
- Turret Peak (Colorado) in Colorado in the United States
- Turret Peak (Wyoming) in Wyoming in the United States

It may also refer to:

- The Battle of Turret Peak in 1873 between the United States Army and members of the Yavapai and Apache tribes
