= Blaurock =

Blaurock is a surname. Notable people with the name include:

- Carl Blaurock (1894–1993), American mountain climber
- Edmund Blaurock (1899–1966), German Generalleutnant
- George Blaurock (c. 1491–1529), Swiss Anabaptist and Reformer

== See also ==
- Mount Blaurock, is a high mountain summit of the Collegiate Peaks in the Sawatch Range of the Rocky Mountains of North America
