= Emery Peak =

Mountain in Colorado, United States

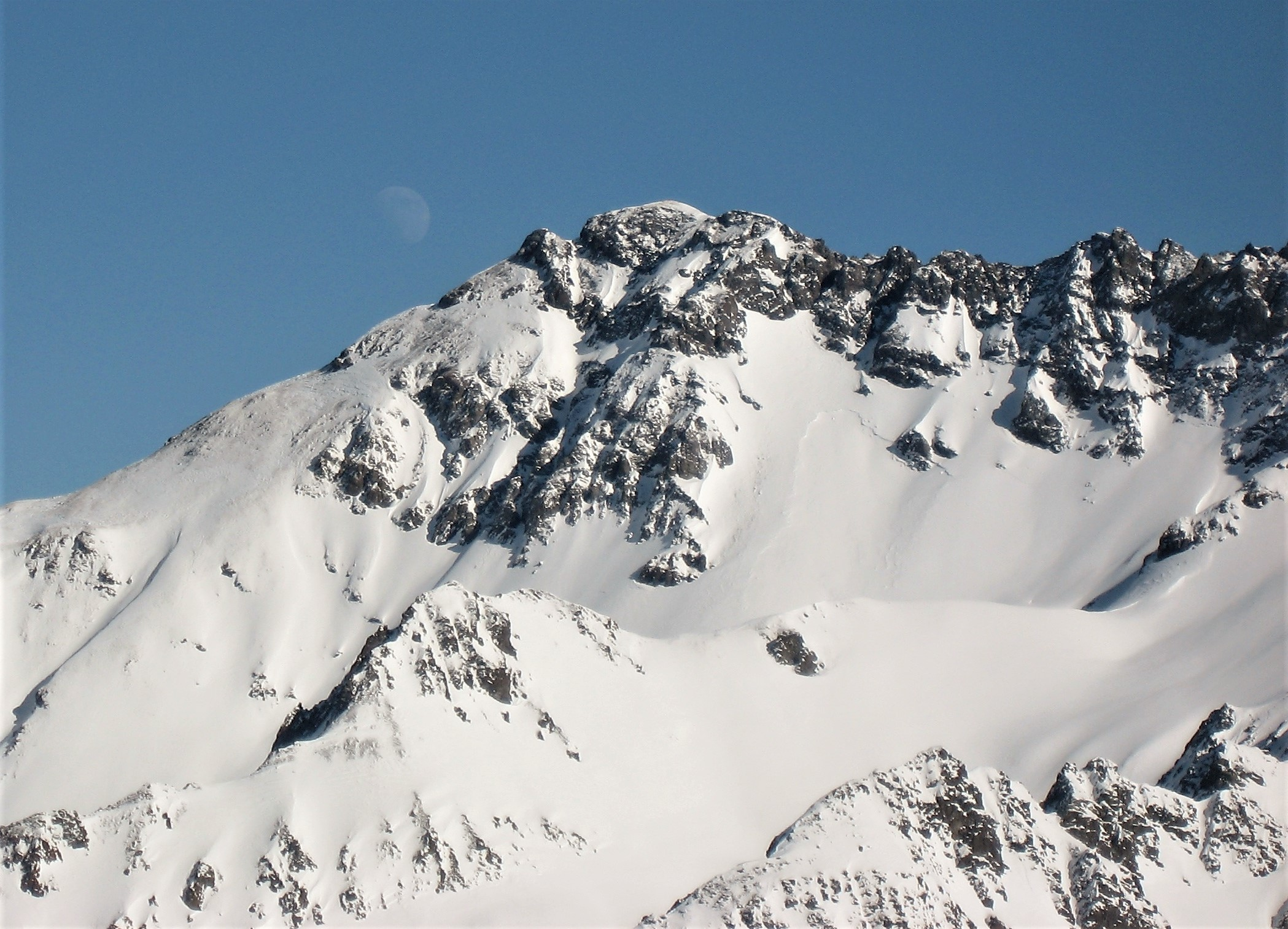
- Southwest aspect in winter

Highest point
- Elevation: 13,321 ft (4,060 m)
- Prominence: 165 ft (50 m)
- Parent peak: Proposal Peak (13,339 ft)
- Isolation: 0.43 mi (0.69 km)
- Coordinates: 37°53′18″N 107°37′16″W

Geography
- Location within Colorado Location within the United States
- Country: United States
- State: Colorado
- County: San Juan
- Parent range: Rocky Mountains; San Juan Mountains
- Topo map: USGS Handies Peak

Climbing
- Easiest route: class 2 hiking

Emery Peak is a 13,321-foot-elevation (4,060-meter) summit located in San Juan County, Colorado, United States.

== Description ==
Emery Peak is situated six miles northeast of the town of Silverton on land administered by the Bureau of Land Management. It is set seven miles west of the Continental Divide in the San Juan Mountains which are a subrange of the Rocky Mountains. Topographic relief is significant as the summit rises 2,700 feet (820 meters) above Cement Creek in 1.5 mile. Precipitation runoff from the mountain drains into tributaries of the Animas River. The mountain's toponym has been officially adopted by the United States Board on Geographic Names, and has been recorded in publications since at least 1906.

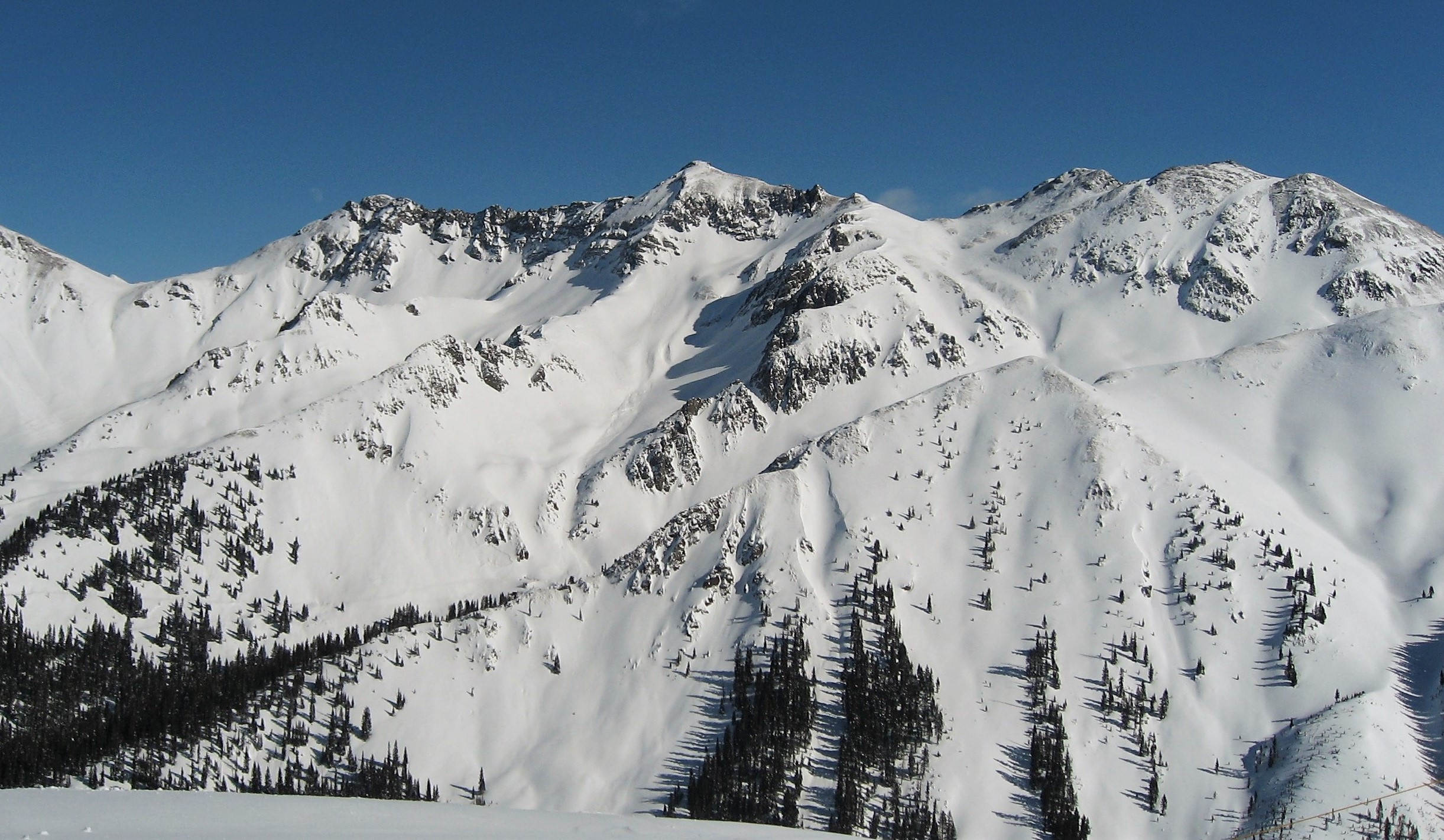
West aspect of parent Proposal Peak centered with Emery Peak to left

== Climate ==
According to the Köppen climate classification system, Emery Peak is located in an alpine subarctic climate zone with long, cold, snowy winters, and cool to warm summers. Due to its altitude, it receives precipitation all year, as snow in winter and as thunderstorms in summer, with a dry period in late spring. Hikers can expect afternoon rain, hail, and lightning from the seasonal monsoon in late July and August.

== See also ==
- Mountains of San Juan County, Colorado
- Thirteener
