= Ervin Peak =

Mountain in Colorado, United States

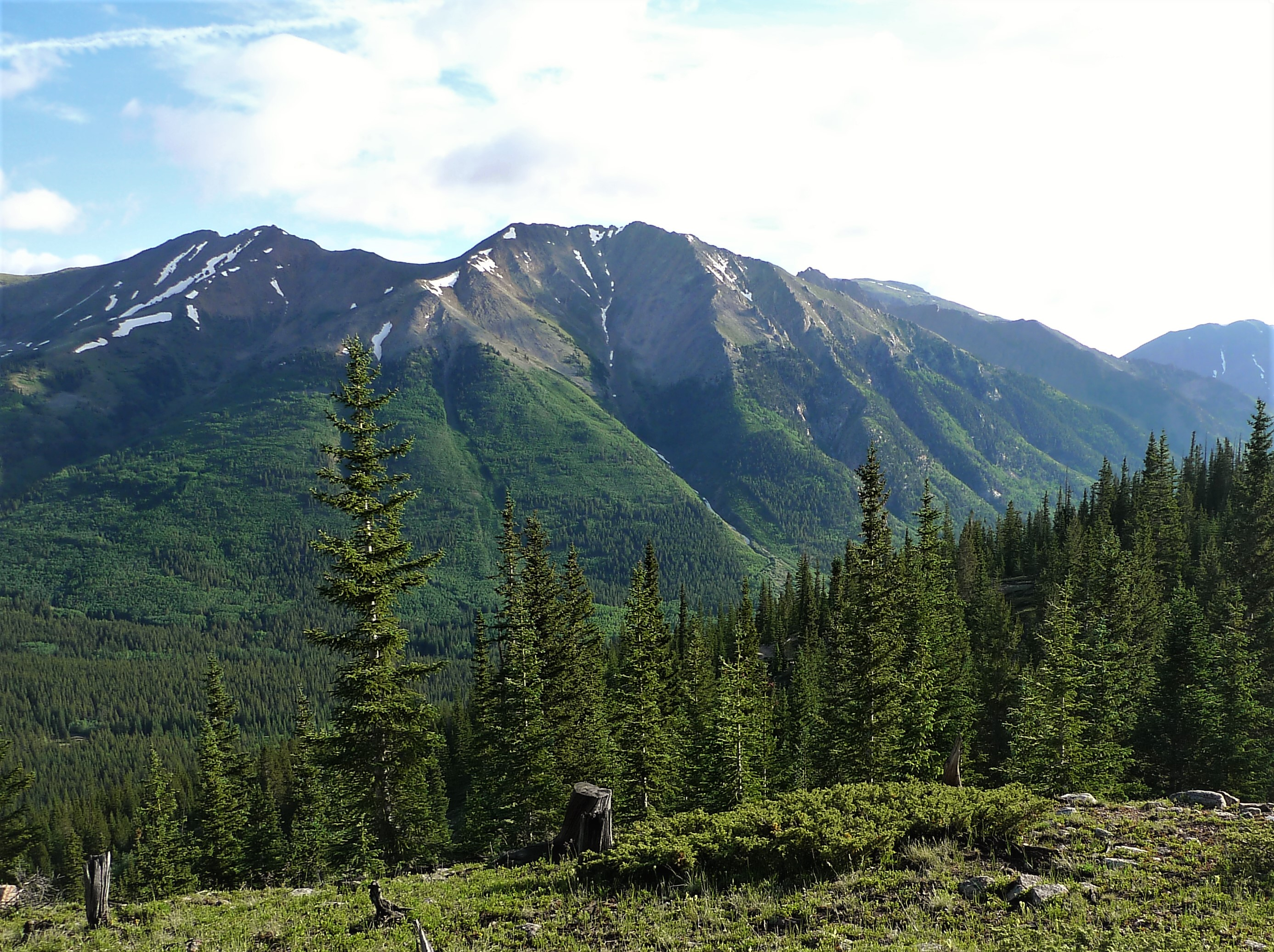
- South aspect, centered

Highest point
- Elevation: 13,538 ft (4,126 m)
- Prominence: 430 ft (131 m)
- Parent peak: Mount Hope (13,939 ft)
- Isolation: 0.96 mi (1.54 km)
- Coordinates: 39°00′14″N 106°26′19″W

Naming
- Etymology: William F. Ervin

Geography
- Location within Colorado Location within the United States
- Country: United States
- State: Colorado
- County: Chaffee
- Protected area: San Isabel National Forest
- Parent range: Rocky Mountains; Sawatch Range; Collegiate Peaks
- Topo map: USGS Mount Elbert

Climbing
- Easiest route: class 2 hiking

Ervin Peak is a 13,538-foot (4,126 m) mountain summit in Chaffee County, Colorado, United States.

== Description ==
Ervin Peak is set approximately five miles (8.0 km) east of the Continental Divide in the Collegiate Peaks which are a subrange of the Sawatch Range. The mountain is located 2.6 miles (4.2 km) southeast of La Plata Peak on land managed by San Isabel National Forest. It ranks as the 234th-highest summit in Colorado. Precipitation runoff from the mountain's south slope drains into Clear Creek, whereas the north slope drains to Lake Creek, and both are tributaries of the Arkansas River. Topographic relief is significant as the summit rises over 3,300 feet (1,006 m) above Clear Creek in 1.2 miles (1.9 km).

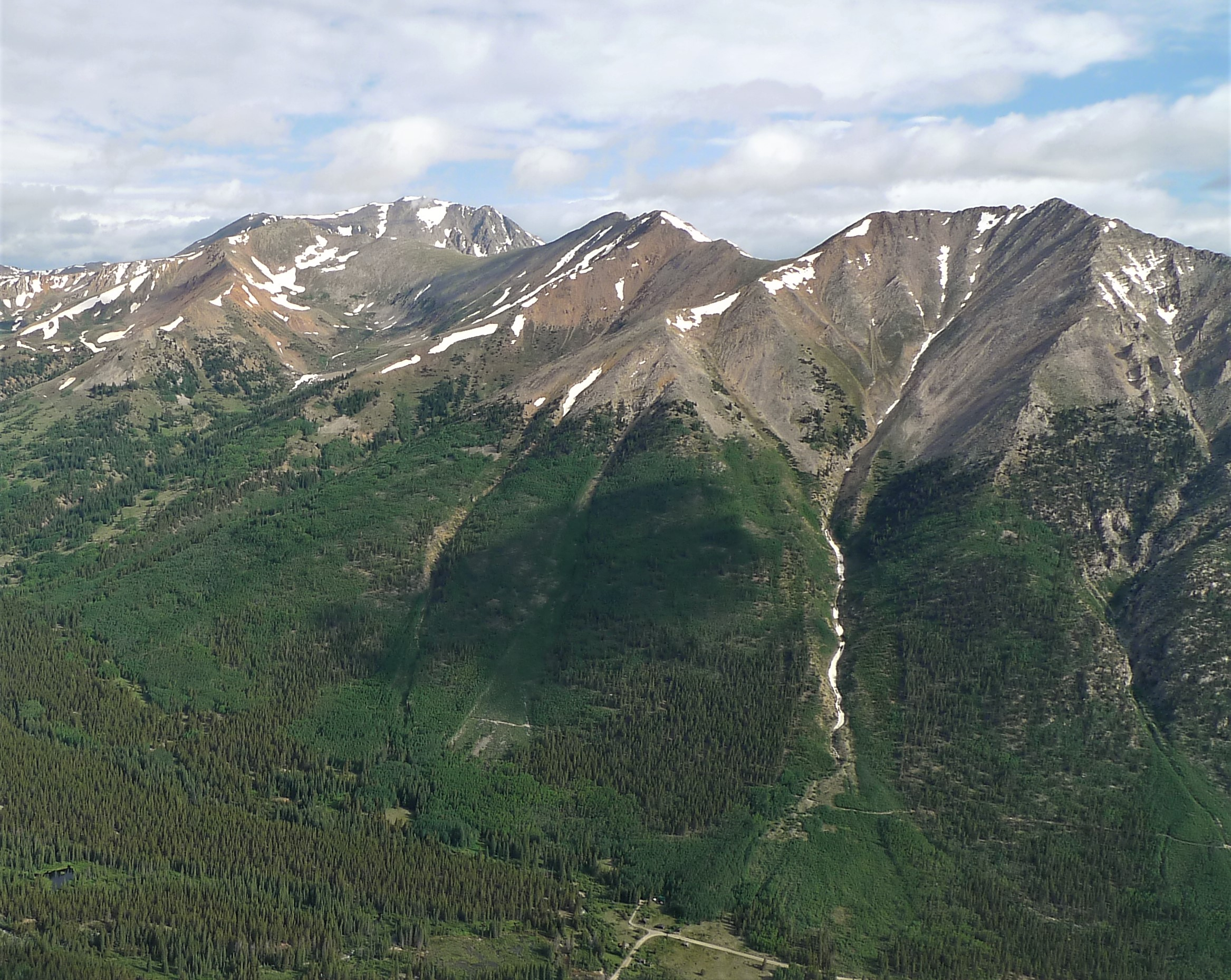
Ervin Peak (right), Mount Blaurock (center), and La Plata Peak (distant left)

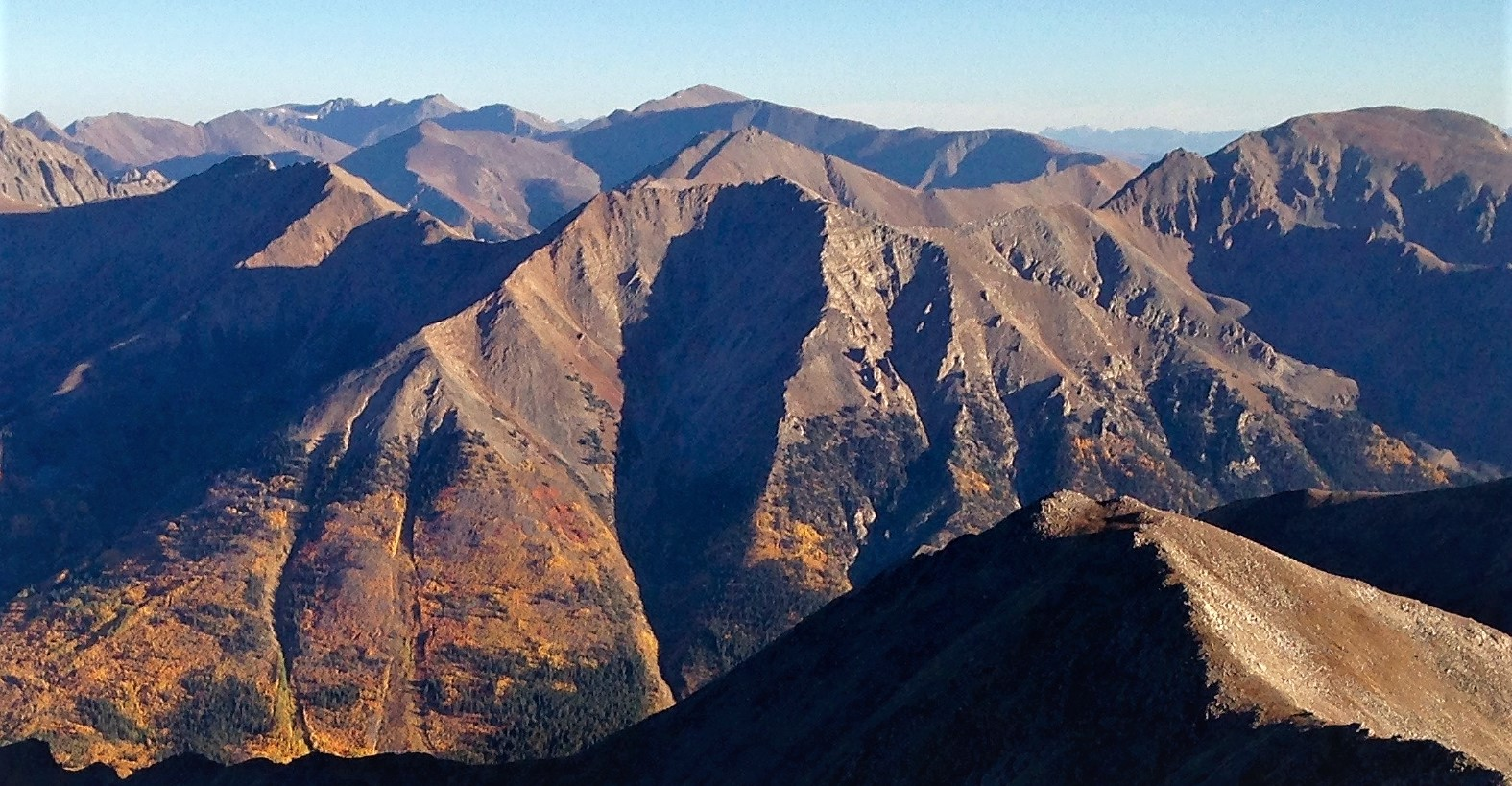
Ervin Peak (centered), from Huron Peak

== Etymology ==
The mountain's toponym was officially adopted in 2003 by the United States Board on Geographic Names to remember William Fulton Ervin (1884–1943) who climbed every peak over 14,000-feet-elevation in Colorado. In 1923, Bill Ervin and climbing partner Carl Blaurock became the first to climb all of Colorado's 46 fourteeners that were known at that time. Mount Blaurock lies less than one mile northwest of Ervin Peak.

== Climate ==
According to the Köppen climate classification system, Ervin Peak is located in an alpine subarctic climate zone with cold, snowy winters, and cool to warm summers. Due to its altitude, it receives precipitation all year, as snow in winter and as thunderstorms in summer, with a dry period in late spring. Climbers can expect afternoon rain, hail, and lightning from the seasonal monsoon in late July and August.

== See also ==
- Mountains of Chaffee County, Colorado
- Thirteener
