= Doublet Peak =

Mountain in the state of Wyoming

- Location within Wyoming Location within the United States

Highest point
- Elevation: 13,606 ft (4,147 m)
- Prominence: 200 ft (61 m)
- Coordinates: 43°09′48″N 109°37′47″W

Geography
- Location: Fremont County, Wyoming, U.S.
- Parent range: Wind River Range
- Topo map: USGS Gannett Peak

Climbing
- First ascent: 1929 Henry Hall, Kenneth Henderson and Robert Underhill (United States)

Doublet Peak (13,606 feet (4,147 m)) is the sixth-highest peak (tied with Turret Peak) in the U.S. state of Wyoming and the fifth-highest in the Wind River Range. The summit is immediately south of Dinwoody Glacier and just west of Mount Warren.

== Hazards ==
Encountering bears is a concern in the Wind River Range. There are other concerns as well, including bugs, wildfires, adverse snow conditions and nighttime cold temperatures.

Importantly, there have been notable incidents, including accidental deaths, due to falls from steep cliffs (a misstep could be fatal in this class 4/5 terrain) and due to falling rocks, over the years, including 1993, 2007 (involving an experienced NOLS leader), 2015 and 2018. Other incidents include a seriously injured backpacker being airlifted near SquareTop Mountain in 2005, and a fatal hiker incident (from an apparent accidental fall) in 2006 that involved state search and rescue. The U.S. Forest Service does not offer updated aggregated records on the official number of fatalities in the Wind River Range.
