= Lone Eagle (disambiguation) =

Lone Eagle is a nickname for Charles Lindbergh.

Lone Eagle may also refer to:

- The Lone Eagle, a 1927 film
- Ryan Mechanics Lone Eagle CM-1, an aircraft
- Australian Lone Eagle, a nickname for aviator Bert Hinkler
- Águila Solitaria, Mexican professional wrestler, Spanish for Lone Eagle
- Lone Eagle Peak, a mountain peak in the Rocky Mountains
