= Proposal Peak =

Mountain in Colorado, United States

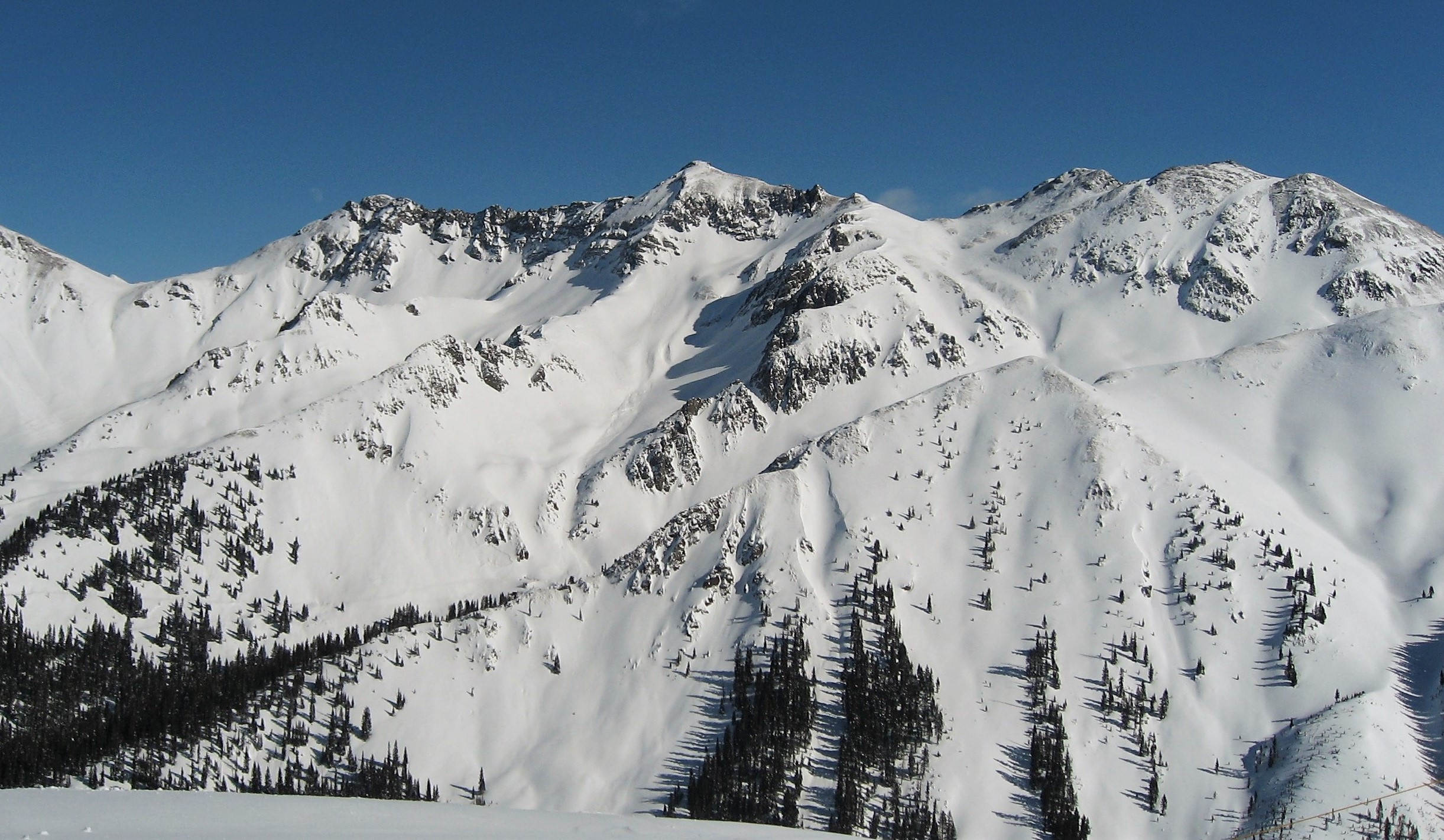
- Southwest aspect centered at top

Highest point
- Elevation: 13,339 ft (4,066 m)
- Prominence: 575 ft (175 m)
- Parent peak: Hanson Peak (13,462 ft)
- Isolation: 1.75 mi (2.82 km)
- Coordinates: 37°52′57″N 107°37′26″W

Geography
- Location within Colorado Location within the United States
- Country: United States
- State: Colorado
- County: San Juan
- Parent range: Rocky Mountains; San Juan Mountains
- Topo map: USGS Handies Peak

Climbing
- Easiest route: class 2 hiking

Proposal Peak is a 13,339-foot-elevation (4,066-meter) mountain summit located in San Juan County, Colorado, United States.

== Description ==
Proposal Peak is situated five miles northeast of the town of Silverton on land administered by the Bureau of Land Management. It is set seven miles west of the Continental Divide in the San Juan Mountains which are a subrange of the Rocky Mountains. Precipitation runoff from the mountain drains into tributaries of the Animas River. Topographic relief is significant as the summit rises 2,700 feet (820 meters) above Cement Creek in 1.5 mile. The mountain's toponym has not been officially adopted by the United States Board on Geographic Names, however it is labeled as "13330" on USGS topographical maps, which corresponds to its elevation.

== Climate ==
According to the Köppen climate classification system, Proposal Peak is located in an alpine subarctic climate zone with long, cold, snowy winters, and cool to warm summers. Due to its altitude, it receives precipitation all year, as snow in winter and as thunderstorms in summer, with a dry period in late spring. Hikers can expect afternoon rain, hail, and lightning from the seasonal monsoon in late July and August.

== See also ==
- Mountains of San Juan County, Colorado
- Thirteener
