= Carl Blaurock =

American mountaineer (1894–1993)

- Born: April 22, 1894; Denver, Colorado, United States
- Died: February 1, 1993 (aged 98); Denver, Colorado, United States
- Education: Colorado School of Mines
- Occupation: Mountaineer
- Spouse: Louise Forsyth

Carl Blaurock (April 22, 1894 – February 1, 1993) was an American mountaineer. He pioneered many climbing routes throughout Colorado and Mount Blaurock (13,616 feet (4,150 meters)) is named after him. Blaurock and climbing partner Bill Ervin were the first to climb all of the 14,000-foot peaks (known as "fourteeners") in the state of Colorado, doing so by 1923.

By 1957, he had also climbed all of the 14,000-foot (4,300-meter) peaks in California as well. In Wyoming, Blaurock participated in the first ascents of Mount Helen, Turret Peak, and Mount Harding along with Hermann Buhl, Elmina Buhl and Albert Ellingwood. In Colorado, he also made the first ascent of Lone Eagle Peak with Stephen H. Hart and Bill Ervin on Labor Day 1929.

In 1912, Blaurock became an early member of the Colorado Mountain Club, but was not a charter member.

== Early life and education ==
Carl Albert Blaurock was born in Denver, Colorado. He studied at North High School in Denver and later went on to study metallurgy at the Colorado School of Mines in Golden, Colorado, graduating in 1916. He was also a member of the Beta Theta Pi fraternity.

After graduation, he worked for his father supplying silver and gold to dentists and took over the family business until his retirement in 1972. His business helped to finance his hobbies, including mountaineering and photography, but it also limited the amount of time he could spend outside of Colorado.

== Mountaineering ==
Blaurock's first major climb and first fourteener was Pikes Peak in 1909.

In 1912, he became a member of the Colorado Mountain Club. He was very active in the club throughout his life, participating in club hikes all over the state of Colorado.

In 1916, he had what he described as his closest brush with death when he slid several hundred feet from the top of one of Colorado's Saint Vrain Glaciers and landed in a crevasse.

In 1920, Blaurock made an expedition to the Sangre de Cristo Range in southern Colorado and climbed the Crestone Needle. Initially, he thought it was the first ascent, but later discovered that Albert Ellingwood and Eleanor Davis had climbed it in 1916.

Blaurock and his climbing partner, Bill Ervin, were the first to summit all of Colorado's 14,000-foot peaks, completing this feat in 1923.

In 1924, he made an expedition to the Wind River Range in Wyoming with Albert Ellingwood, Herman Buhl, and Emma Buhl. There, the group managed to make first ascents of Mount Helen, Mount Turret, and Mount Warren. That year, he was also admitted to The AdAmAn Club in Colorado Springs. Over his lifetime, he made 25 New Years Eve hikes to the summit of Pikes Peak with the club.

In 1925, Blaurock and two others retrieved the body of his friend Agnes Vaille, who had succeeded in making the first winter ascent of the East Face of Colorado's Longs Peak, but died on the descent as the weather deteriorated into a blizzard. That same year, he was elected president of the Colorado Mountain Club.

In 1926, Blaurock traveled to Europe to climb in the Alps with his friends Henry Buchtel and William Erwin. During the trip, they were able to summit the Matterhorn.

In 1957, he completed his goal of climbing all 14,000-foot peaks in California. This made him the first person to summit all fourteeners in the continental United States. He declared that his favorite climb was Longs Peak's east face, which he completed 18 times.

Blaurock was known among the mountaineering community for doing headstands on the summits of mountains and pictures exist of him doing so on Longs Peak and Sunlight Peak (also in Colorado). He joked that it was his method of getting his feet higher on the mountains than anybody else.

His last climb was in 1973, to the summit of Notch Mountain in Colorado. The trip was to commemorate William Henry Jackson's photograph of the Mount of the Holy Cross and he placed a plaque at the position from which Jackson took his photograph.

== Equipment ==
Carl often used a sleeping bag made of wool batting with cotton covering that was produced by Daniels and Fisher in 1912 for the Colorado Mountain Club. Carl typically used leather army boots with hobnails and liked to wear a wool army shirt and trousers. If the weather was cold, he was known to stuff his clothing with newspapers to help provide additional insulation, particularly on his New Year's Eve climbs of Pikes Peak with the AdAmAn Club. Carl also built his first pair of skis from wood in 1913 after observing Carl Howelson demonstrate the sport in Denver.

== Legacy ==
To honor Blaurock's legacy of climbing, the U.S. Department of the Interior named a 13,616-foot peak Mount Blaurock on July 11, 2004.

== Personal life ==
During World War I, Carl served as a balloon observer in the signal corps.

Carl married Louise Forsyth in 1926, and they remained married 65 years until her death. Louise was a schoolteacher from Chicago and he first met her during summer hikes organized by the Colorado Mountain Club.

In 1942, a federal grand jury indicted Carl for tax evasion, alleging that he failed to report income on which $2,375 was due in federal income taxes between 1935 and 1939 and neglected to report a gross income of $354,156 for that period of time. Carl pled guilty and was sentenced to five months in county jail, in addition to paying the tax due and added penalties of about $2,000.

== See also ==
- List of people from Denver
- Lists of sportspeople
