= Mount Barnard (California) =

Mountain in the U.S. state of California

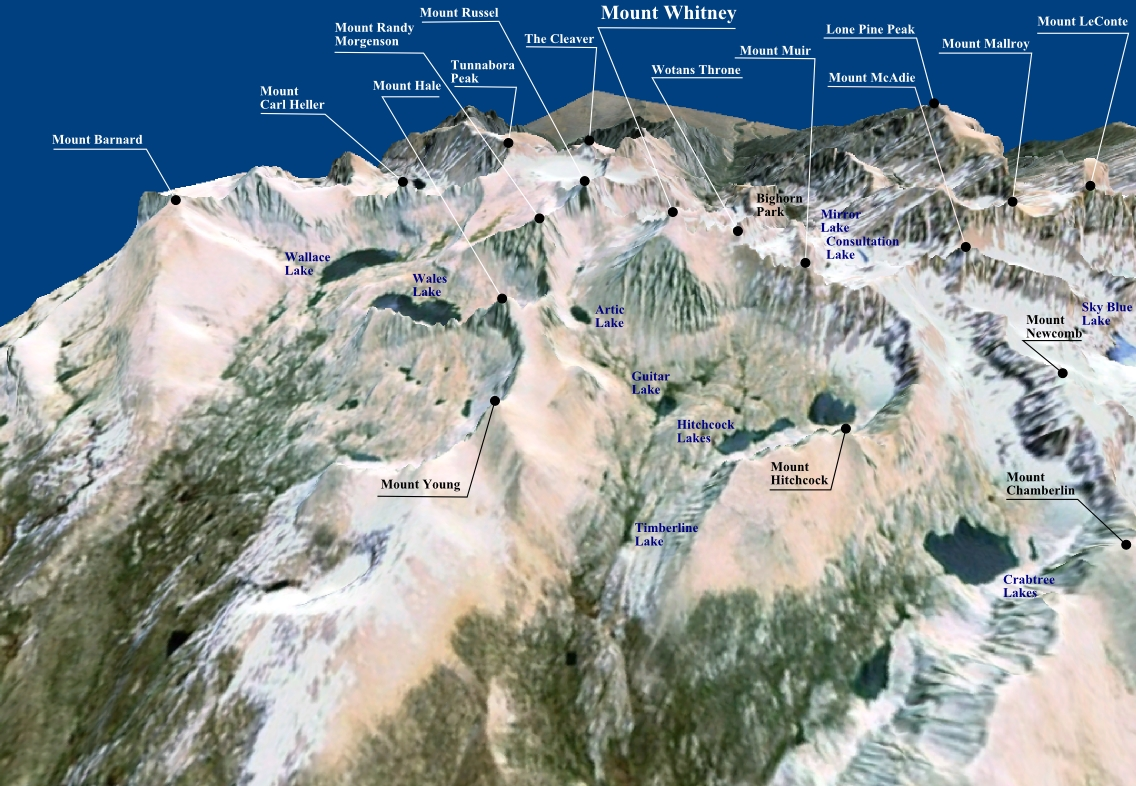
- A 3D image of Mount Whitney based on topographic data from NASA and World Imagery. Mount Barnard mount appears in the upper left.

Highest point
- Elevation: 13,996 ft (4,266 m) NAVD 88
- Prominence: 932 ft (284 m)
- Parent peak: Mount Tyndall
- Listing: Sierra Peaks Section; Vagmarken Club Sierra Crest List; Western States Climbers Star peak
- Coordinates: 36°37′42″N 118°19′18″W

Geography
- Location within California Location within the United States
- Location: Inyo / Tulare counties, California, U.S.
- Parent range: Sierra Nevada
- Topo map: USGS Mount Williamson

Climbing
- First ascent: 1892 by W. L. Hunter, John Hunter, William Hunter and C. Mulholland.
- Easiest route: Simple scramble, class 2

Mount Barnard is a mountain in the U.S. state of California, and has the dubious distinction of being the highest thirteener, a peak between 13,000 and 13,999 feet (3,962 and 4,267 m) in elevation, in the United States. It is located on the Sierra Crest and straddles the boundary between Tulare and Inyo counties about 2 miles (3 km) southwest of Mount Williamson, the second-highest peak in the state; Mount Barnard is the twelfth-highest.

The first ascent was by W. L. Hunter, John Hunter, William Hunter and C. Mulholland on September 25, 1892. They named the peak in honor of E. E. Barnard, a noted astronomer.
