= Stewart Peak (Colorado) =

Mountain in the state of Colorado

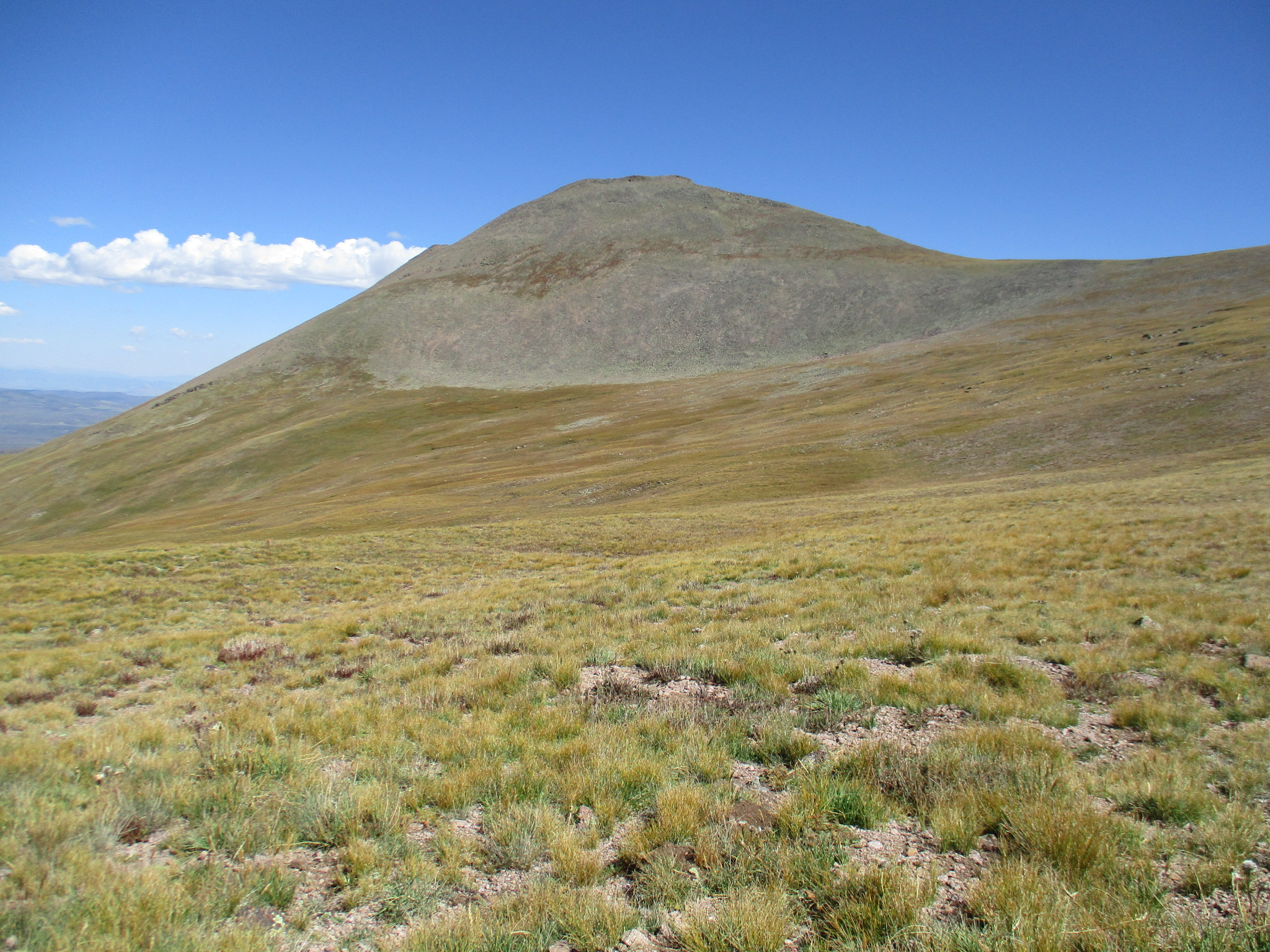
- Stewart Peak viewed from the west

Highest point
- Elevation: 13,983 ft (4,262 m)
- Prominence: 883 ft (269 m)
- Isolation: 2.54 mi (4.09 km)
- Coordinates: 38°01′23″N 106°55′25″W

Geography
- Location within Colorado
- Location: Saguache County, Colorado, United States
- Parent range: La Garita Mountains
- Topo map(s): USGS 7.5' topographic map Stewart Peak, Colorado

Climbing
- Easiest route: Hike

Stewart Peak, elevation 13,983 ft (4,262 m), is a summit in Colorado. The peak is the second highest thirteener (a peak between 13,000 and 13,999 feet in elevation) in the state. It is located in the La Garita Mountains, sub-range of the San Juan Mountains, in Saguache County, within the La Garita Wilderness. Stewart Peak is the 55th highest peak in Colorado by most standard definitions, just missing the list of Colorado fourteeners. At one time, the peak's elevation was measured to be over 14,000 ft and it was believed to be a fourteener, but more recent and accurate surveys have dropped it below that threshold.

== Climate ==
Climate data for Stewart Peak 38.0200 N, 106.9331 W, Elevation: 13,383 ft (4,079 m) (1991–2020 normals)
Month	Jan	Feb	Mar	Apr	May	Jun	Jul	Aug	Sep	Oct	Nov	Dec	Year
Mean daily maximum °F (°C)	23.7 (−4.6)	23.5 (−4.7)	28.7 (−1.8)	34.2 (1.2)	42.7 (5.9)	54.3 (12.4)	59.1 (15.1)	56.8 (13.8)	51.1 (10.6)	41.1 (5.1)	30.4 (−0.9)	23.7 (−4.6)	39.1 (4.0)
Daily mean °F (°C)	12.2 (−11.0)	11.7 (−11.3)	16.3 (−8.7)	21.4 (−5.9)	30.1 (−1.1)	40.6 (4.8)	45.8 (7.7)	44.1 (6.7)	38.4 (3.6)	28.9 (−1.7)	19.3 (−7.1)	12.6 (−10.8)	26.8 (−2.9)
Mean daily minimum °F (°C)	0.7 (−17.4)	−0.1 (−17.8)	4.0 (−15.6)	8.7 (−12.9)	17.5 (−8.1)	26.9 (−2.8)	32.4 (0.2)	31.3 (−0.4)	25.7 (−3.5)	16.8 (−8.4)	8.2 (−13.2)	1.5 (−16.9)	14.5 (−9.7)
Average precipitation inches (mm)	3.33 (85)	3.59 (91)	3.90 (99)	4.60 (117)	2.45 (62)	0.99 (25)	2.96 (75)	3.21 (82)	2.68 (68)	3.21 (82)	3.72 (94)	3.39 (86)	38.03 (966)
Source: PRISM Climate Group

== History ==
The first recorded ascent was on September 23, 1879, by the surveying party of Emmanuel Lee McNider on behalf of the U.S. government.

== See also ==
- List of Colorado mountain ranges
- List of Colorado mountain summits
  - List of Colorado fourteeners
  - List of Colorado 4000 meter prominent summits
  - List of the most prominent summits of Colorado
- List of Colorado county high points
