= Mount Blaurock =

Mountain in the state of Colorado

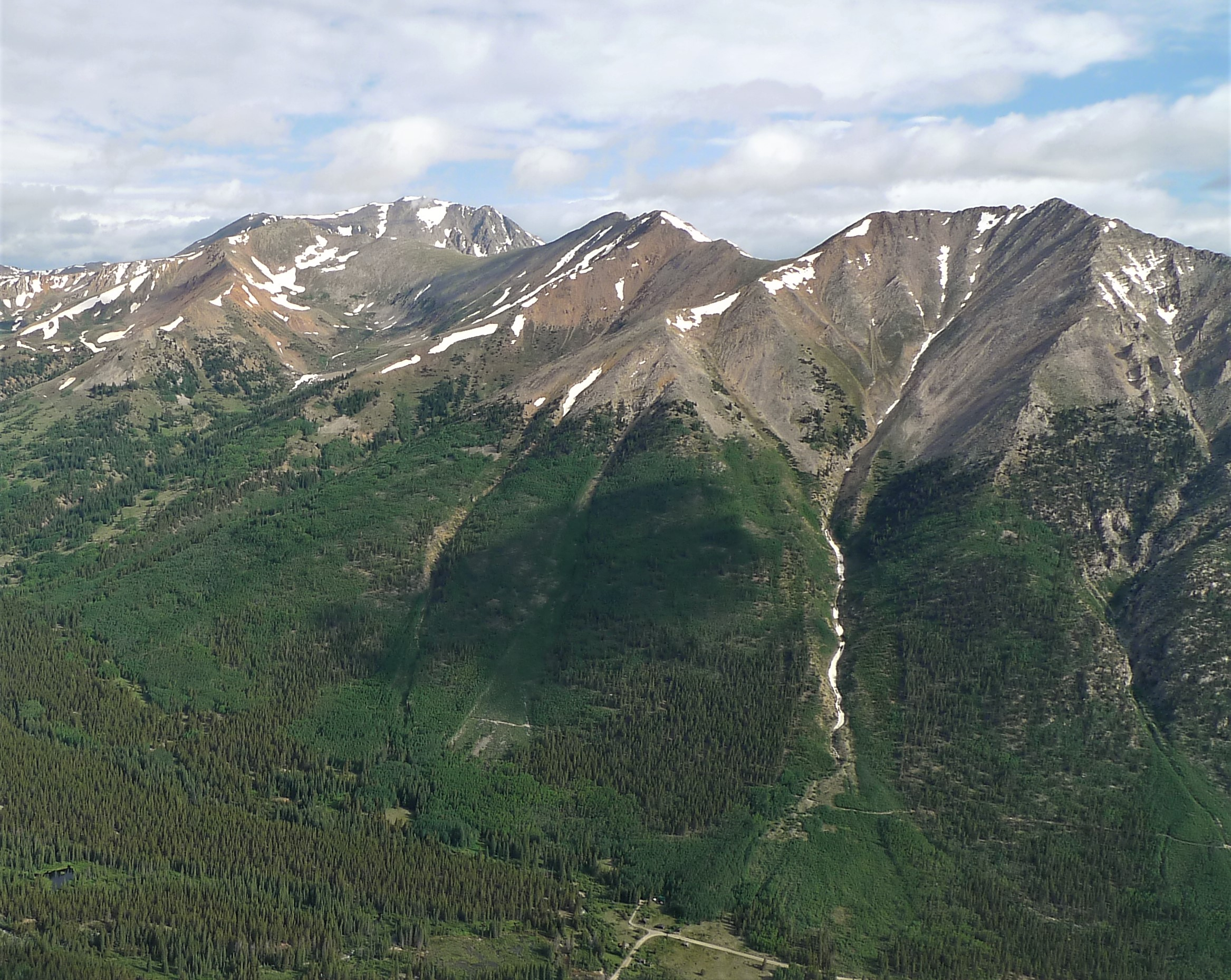
- South aspect of Mt. Blaurock (center) (Ervin Peak to right)

Highest point
- Elevation: 13,623 ft (4,152 m)
- Prominence: 436 ft (133 m)
- Parent peak: La Plata Peak
- Isolation: 1.62 mi (2.61 km)
- Coordinates: 39°00′40″N 106°27′13″W

Geography
- Location within Colorado
- Location: Chaffee County, Colorado, U.S.
- Parent range: Sawatch Range, Collegiate Peaks
- Topo map(s): USGS 7.5' topographic map Mount Elbert, Colorado

Mount Blaurock is a high mountain summit of the Collegiate Peaks in the Sawatch Range of the Rocky Mountains of North America. The 13,623-foot (4,152 m) thirteener is located in San Isabel National Forest, 21.1 miles (33.9 km) northwest by west (bearing 307°) of the Town of Buena Vista in Chaffee County, Colorado, United States. Mount Blaurock was named in honor of Carl Blaurock, a co-founder of the Colorado Mountain Club and one of the first two persons to climb all of Colorado's fourteeners.

== See also ==
- List of Colorado mountain ranges
- List of Colorado mountain summits
  - List of Colorado fourteeners
  - List of Colorado 4000 meter prominent summits
  - List of the most prominent summits of Colorado
- List of Colorado county high points
