= Turret Peak (Wyoming) =

Mountain in the state of Wyoming

- Location within Wyoming Location within the United States

Highest point
- Elevation: 13,600 ft (4,100 m)
- Prominence: 600 ft (180 m)
- Coordinates: 43°09′53″N 109°37′08″W

Geography
- Location: Fremont County, Wyoming, U.S.
- Parent range: Wind River Range
- Topo map: USGS Fremont Peak North

Climbing
- First ascent: 1924 by Carl Blaurock and Albert Ellingwood

Turret Peak is the sixth-highest peak (tied with Doublet Peak) in the U.S. state of Wyoming and the fifth-highest in the Wind River Range. The Dinwoody Glacier is located on the northwest slope of the mountain, while the Helen Glacier is to the south. Turret Peak is estimated to be between 13,606 to 13,646 feet (4,147 to 4,159 meters) high.

== Hazards ==
Encountering bears is a concern in the Wind River Range. There are other concerns as well, including bugs, wildfires, adverse snow conditions and nighttime cold temperatures.

Importantly, there have been notable incidents, including accidental deaths, due to falls from steep cliffs (a misstep could be fatal in this class 4/5 terrain) and due to falling rocks, over the years, including 1993, 2007 (involving an experienced NOLS leader), 2015 and 2018. Other incidents include a seriously injured backpacker being airlifted near SquareTop Mountain in 2005, and a fatal hiker incident (from an apparent accidental fall) in 2006 that involved state search and rescue. The U.S. Forest Service does not offer updated aggregated records on the official number of fatalities in the Wind River Range.
