= Flagstone Peak (Fremont County, Wyoming) =

Mountain in Wyoming, United States

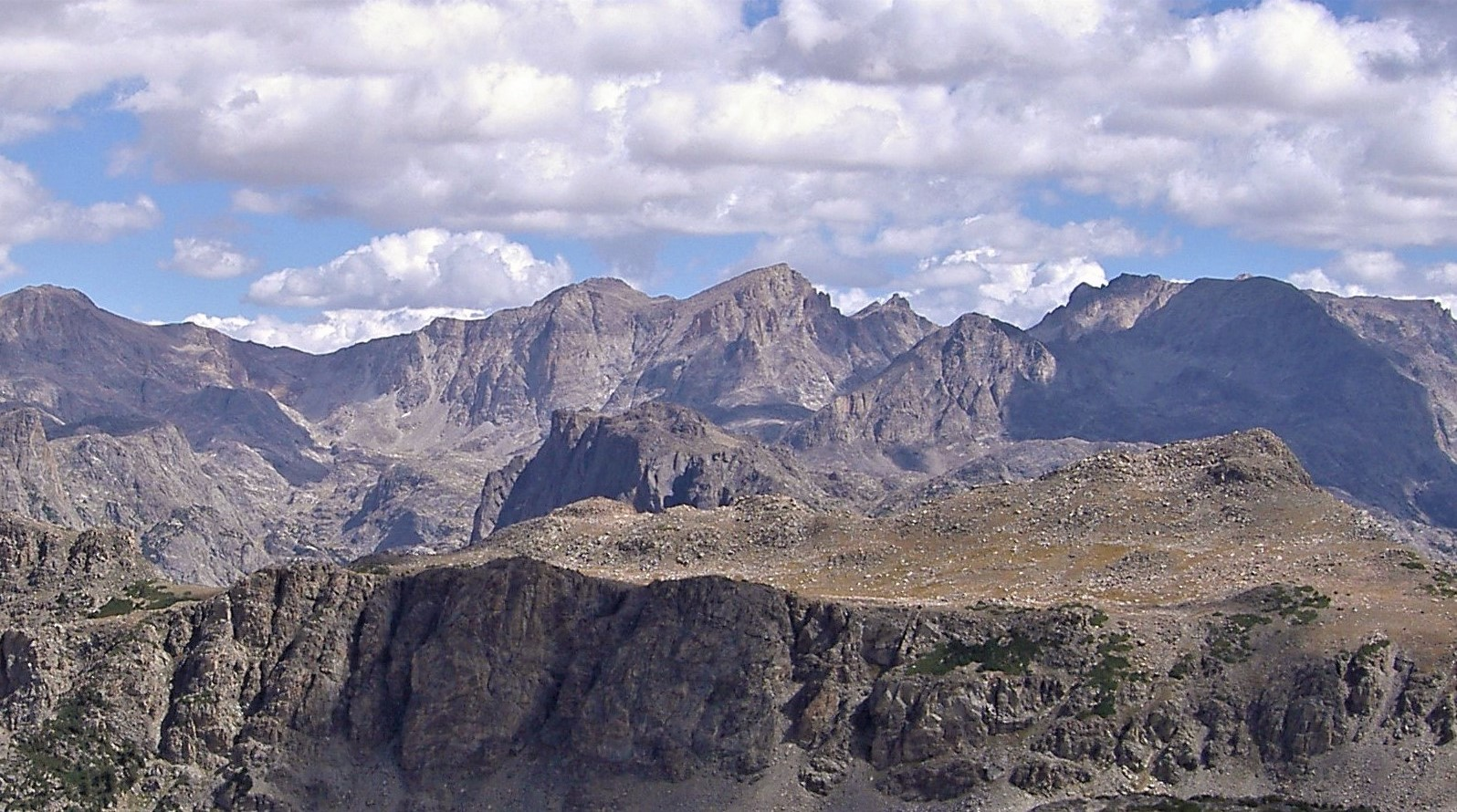
- West aspect, centered on skyline

Highest point
- Elevation: 13,456 ft (4,101 m)
- Prominence: 810 ft (250 m)
- Coordinates: 43°12′55″N 109°40′33″W

Geography
- Location within Wyoming Location within the United States
- Location: Fremont / Sublette counties, Wyoming, U.S.
- Parent range: Wind River Range
- Topo map: USGS Gannett Peak

Climbing
- First ascent: 1946

Flagstone Peak (13,456 ft (4,101 m)) is located in the Wind River Range in the U.S. state of Wyoming. The peak is the 12th highest peak in Wyoming. The summit is located on the Continental Divide and is in both Shoshone and Bridger-Teton National Forests. The Flagstone Peak-Southeast Peak (13,160 ft (4,010 m)) lies .25 mi (0.40 km) to the southeast.

== Climate ==
Climate data for Flagstone Peak 43.2169 N, 109.6781 W, Elevation: 12,959 ft (3,950 m) (1991–2020 normals)
Month	Jan	Feb	Mar	Apr	May	Jun	Jul	Aug	Sep	Oct	Nov	Dec	Year
Mean daily maximum °F (°C)	18.0 (−7.8)	17.1 (−8.3)	22.3 (−5.4)	27.5 (−2.5)	36.5 (2.5)	47.5 (8.6)	57.1 (13.9)	55.9 (13.3)	47.4 (8.6)	35.1 (1.7)	23.6 (−4.7)	17.5 (−8.1)	33.8 (1.0)
Daily mean °F (°C)	8.2 (−13.2)	6.6 (−14.1)	11.2 (−11.6)	15.8 (−9.0)	24.5 (−4.2)	34.6 (1.4)	43.2 (6.2)	42.2 (5.7)	34.3 (1.3)	23.6 (−4.7)	14.0 (−10.0)	8.0 (−13.3)	22.2 (−5.5)
Mean daily minimum °F (°C)	−1.6 (−18.7)	−3.9 (−19.9)	0.1 (−17.7)	4.1 (−15.5)	12.5 (−10.8)	21.8 (−5.7)	29.3 (−1.5)	28.4 (−2.0)	21.3 (−5.9)	12.1 (−11.1)	4.5 (−15.3)	−1.5 (−18.6)	10.6 (−11.9)
Average precipitation inches (mm)	2.93 (74)	2.92 (74)	3.59 (91)	5.65 (144)	4.45 (113)	2.92 (74)	2.06 (52)	2.02 (51)	3.00 (76)	3.75 (95)	3.01 (76)	2.81 (71)	39.11 (991)
Source: PRISM Climate Group

== Hazards ==
Encountering bears is a concern in the Wind River Range. There are other concerns as well, including bugs, wildfires, adverse snow conditions and nighttime cold temperatures.

Importantly, there have been notable incidents, including accidental deaths, due to falls from steep cliffs (a misstep could be fatal in this class 4/5 terrain) and due to falling rocks, over the years, including 1993, 2007 (involving an experienced NOLS leader), 2015 and 2018. Other incidents include a seriously injured backpacker being airlifted near SquareTop Mountain in 2005, and a fatal hiker incident (from an apparent accidental fall) in 2006 that involved state search and rescue. The U.S. Forest Service does not offer updated aggregated records on the official number of fatalities in the Wind River Range.
