= Helen Glacier =

Glacier in Wyoming, United States

- Location within Wyoming
- Type: Mountain glacier
- Location: Fremont County, Wyoming, USA
- Coordinates: 43°09′21″N 109°37′01″W
- Length: 1.2 mi (1.9 km)
- Terminus: Talus
- Status: Retreating

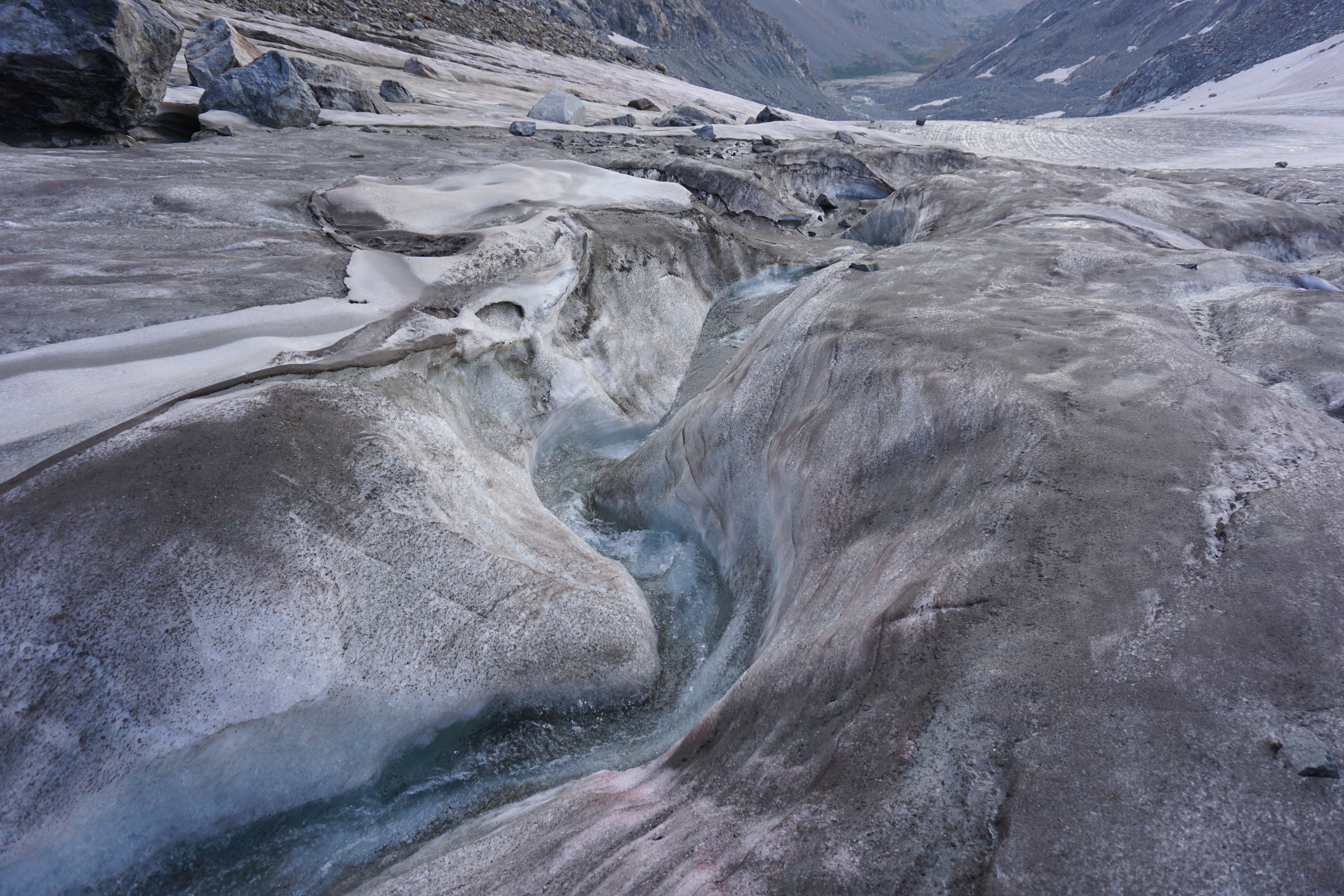

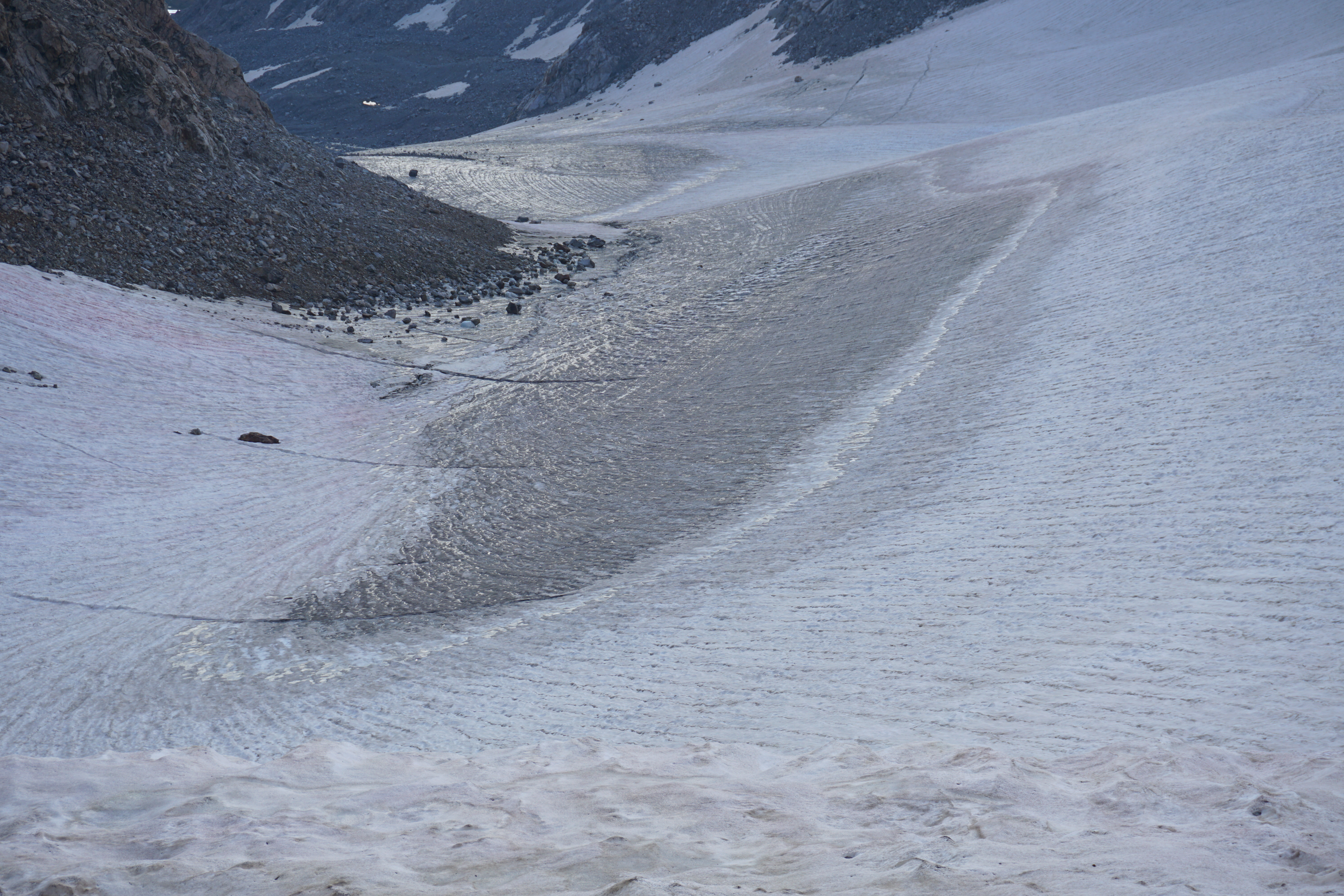

Helen Glacier is located east of the Continental Divide in the northern Wind River Range in the US state of Wyoming. The glacier is located in the Fitzpatrick Wilderness of Shoshone National Forest, and is among the largest grouping of glaciers in the American Rocky Mountains. Helen Glacier flows to the east from a cirque to the northeast of Mount Helen.

== See also ==
- List of glaciers in the United States
