= Mount Febbas =

Mountain in the American state of Wyoming

- Location within Wyoming Location within the United States

Highest point
- Elevation: 13,474 ft (4,107 m)
- Prominence: 708 ft (216 m)
- Coordinates: 43°10′34″N 109°36′06″W

Geography
- Location: Fremont County, Wyoming, U.S.
- Parent range: Wind River Range
- Topo map: USGS Fremont Peak North

Climbing
- First ascent: 1920 Arthur Tate

Mount Febbas (13,474 ft (4,107 m)) is located in the Wind River Range in the U.S. state of Wyoming. Mount Febbas is at the western end of the high-altitude plateau known as Horse Ridge, which extends for more than 10 mi (16 km) to the northeast at elevations greater than 10,000 ft (3,000 m).

== Climate ==
Climate data for Mount Febbas 43.1740 N, 109.5961 W, Elevation: 13,091 ft (3,990 m) (1991–2020 normals)
Month	Jan	Feb	Mar	Apr	May	Jun	Jul	Aug	Sep	Oct	Nov	Dec	Year
Mean daily maximum °F (°C)	17.1 (−8.3)	16.8 (−8.4)	22.8 (−5.1)	27.7 (−2.4)	36.5 (2.5)	47.0 (8.3)	56.4 (13.6)	55.2 (12.9)	46.8 (8.2)	34.8 (1.6)	23.1 (−4.9)	17.1 (−8.3)	33.4 (0.8)
Daily mean °F (°C)	8.7 (−12.9)	8.0 (−13.3)	13.2 (−10.4)	17.9 (−7.8)	26.8 (−2.9)	36.8 (2.7)	45.3 (7.4)	43.9 (6.6)	36.3 (2.4)	25.5 (−3.6)	15.0 (−9.4)	8.4 (−13.1)	23.8 (−4.5)
Mean daily minimum °F (°C)	0.2 (−17.7)	−0.7 (−18.2)	3.7 (−15.7)	8.0 (−13.3)	17.2 (−8.2)	26.7 (−2.9)	34.1 (1.2)	32.5 (0.3)	25.9 (−3.4)	16.1 (−8.8)	6.9 (−13.9)	0.2 (−17.7)	14.2 (−9.9)
Average precipitation inches (mm)	2.98 (76)	3.24 (82)	3.02 (77)	4.28 (109)	4.81 (122)	2.74 (70)	1.55 (39)	1.54 (39)	2.41 (61)	3.06 (78)	3.09 (78)	3.43 (87)	36.15 (918)
Source: PRISM Climate Group

== Hazards ==
Encountering bears is a concern in the Wind River Range. There are other concerns as well, including bugs, wildfires, adverse snow conditions and nighttime cold temperatures.

Importantly, there have been notable incidents, including accidental deaths, due to falls from steep cliffs (a misstep could be fatal in this class 4/5 terrain) and due to falling rocks, over the years, including 1993, 2007 (involving an experienced NOLS leader), 2015 and 2018. Other incidents include a seriously injured backpacker being airlifted near SquareTop Mountain in 2005, and a fatal hiker incident (from an apparent accidental fall) in 2006 that involved state search and rescue. The U.S. Forest Service does not offer updated aggregated records on the official number of fatalities in the Wind River Range.
