= Pigeon Peak =

Mountain in the state of Colorado

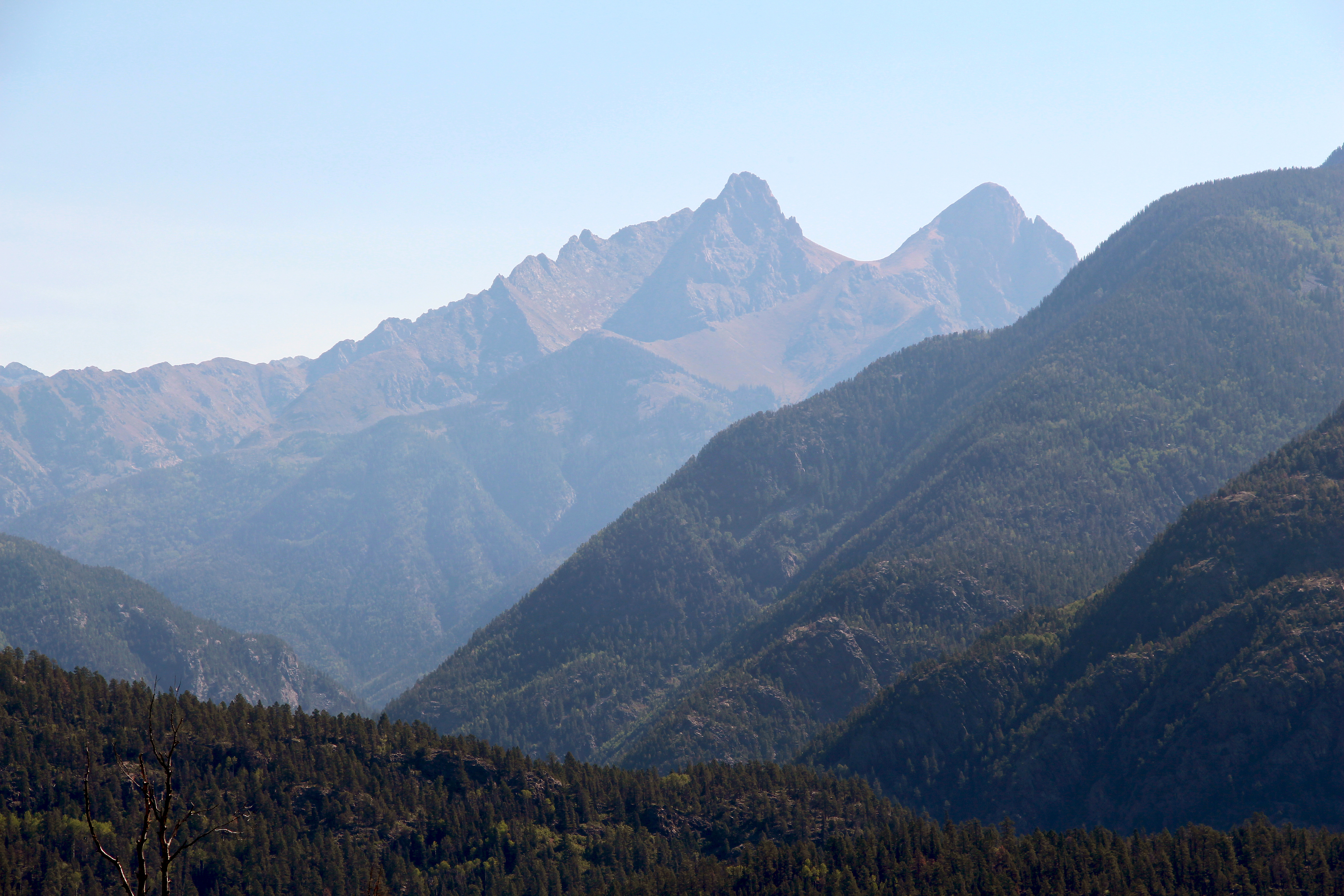
- Pigeon Peak (center) from US 550, Colorado

Highest point
- Elevation: 13,978 ft (4,260 m)
- Prominence: 1,152 ft (351 m)
- Isolation: 1.49 mi (2.40 km)
- Coordinates: 37°37′57″N 107°38′46″W

Geography
- Location within Colorado
- Location: La Plata County, Colorado, U.S.
- Parent range: San Juan Mountains, br/>Needle Mountains
- Topo map(s): USGS 7.5' topographic map Snowdon Peak, Colorado

Climbing
- Easiest route: Northwest slope: scramble, class 3

Pigeon Peak, elevation 13,978 ft (4,260 m), is a summit in the Needle Mountains, a subrange of the San Juan Mountains in the southwestern part of the US State of Colorado. It rises dramatically on the east side of the Animas River, 1.5 miles (2.4 km) west of the fourteener Mount Eolus. It is located in the Weminuche Wilderness, part of the San Juan National Forest.

Pigeon Peak is notable both for its absolute height and for its local relief. It is the 57th highest independent peak in Colorado, narrowly missing the well-known list of fourteeners. In terms of local relief, it is one of the most impressive peaks in Colorado. Its most dramatic rise is over the Animas River to the west, over which it rises nearly 6,000 feet (1,829 m) in under 2.5 miles (4 km). Also, its east face is an 800 feet (244 m) cliff.

== Climbing ==
Since Pigeon Peak is not a fourteener, it sees far less traffic than the nearby trio of Mount Eolus, Windom Peak and Sunlight Peak. The standard route is not technically difficult, but it is long and requires a little-hiked wilderness approach. Climbers typically camp near Ruby Lake north of the peak. From there the route ascends to a saddle between Pigeon Peak and Turret Peak, southwest of Pigeon. The route then descends and makes a traverse around to the opposite side of the peak, finally ascending the northwest slopes. Difficulties involve class 3 scrambling.

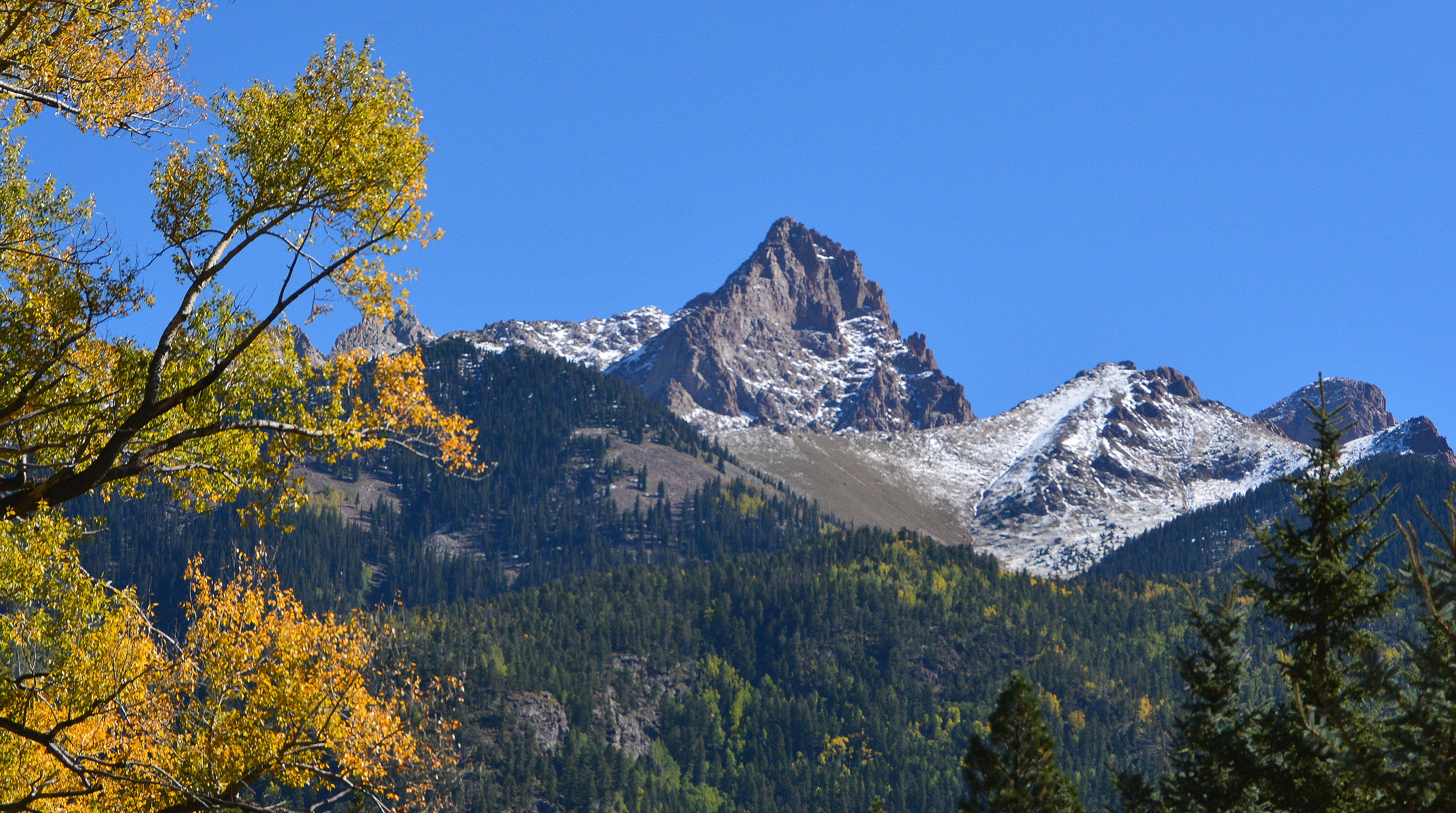
Pigeon Peak viewed from Durango and Silverton train

== See also ==
- List of Colorado mountain ranges
- List of Colorado mountain summits
  - List of Colorado fourteeners
  - List of Colorado 4000 meter prominent summits
  - List of the most prominent summits of Colorado
- List of Colorado county high points
