= Mount Warren =

Mountain in the state of Wyoming

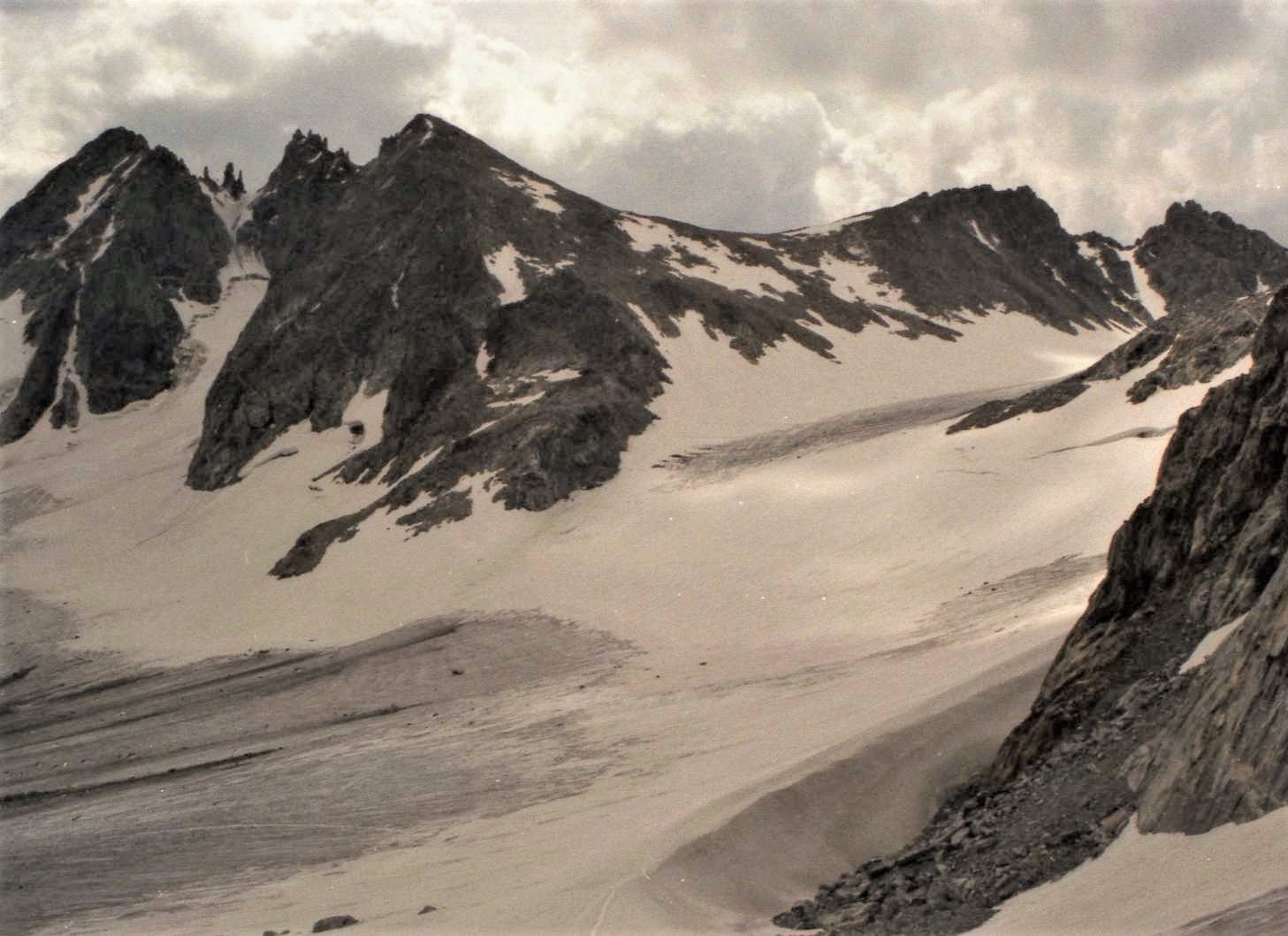
- North aspect, summit to left

Highest point
- Elevation: 13,728 ft (4,184 m)
- Prominence: 962 ft (293 m)
- Coordinates: 43°09′49″N 109°37′41″W

Geography
- Location within Wyoming Location within the United States
- Location: Fremont County, Wyoming, U.S.
- Parent range: Wind River Range
- Topo map: USGS Gannett Peak

Climbing
- First ascent: 1924 by Carl Blaurock and Albert Ellingwood

Mount Warren (13,728 ft (4,184 m)) is located in the Wind River Range in the U.S. state of Wyoming. The peak is the third peak in the range and the fourth tallest in Wyoming. The summit is located in the Fitzpatrick Wilderness of Shoshone National Forest and rises above several glaciers, the best known being Dinwoody Glacier which is immediately north of the summit tower. The mountain abuts, but is not within, either Bridger National Forest or Sublette County, Wyoming.

== Hazards ==
Encountering bears is a concern in the Wind River Range. There are other concerns as well, including bugs, wildfires, adverse snow conditions and nighttime cold temperatures.

Importantly, there have been notable incidents, including accidental deaths, due to falls from steep cliffs (a misstep could be fatal in this class 4/5 terrain) and due to falling rocks, over the years, including 1993, 2007 (involving an experienced NOLS leader), 2015 and 2018. Other incidents include a seriously injured backpacker being airlifted near SquareTop Mountain in 2005, and a fatal hiker incident (from an apparent accidental fall) in 2006 that involved state search and rescue. The U.S. Forest Service does not offer updated aggregated records on the official number of fatalities in the Wind River Range.
