= Mount Helen (Wyoming) =

Mountain in the American state of Wyoming

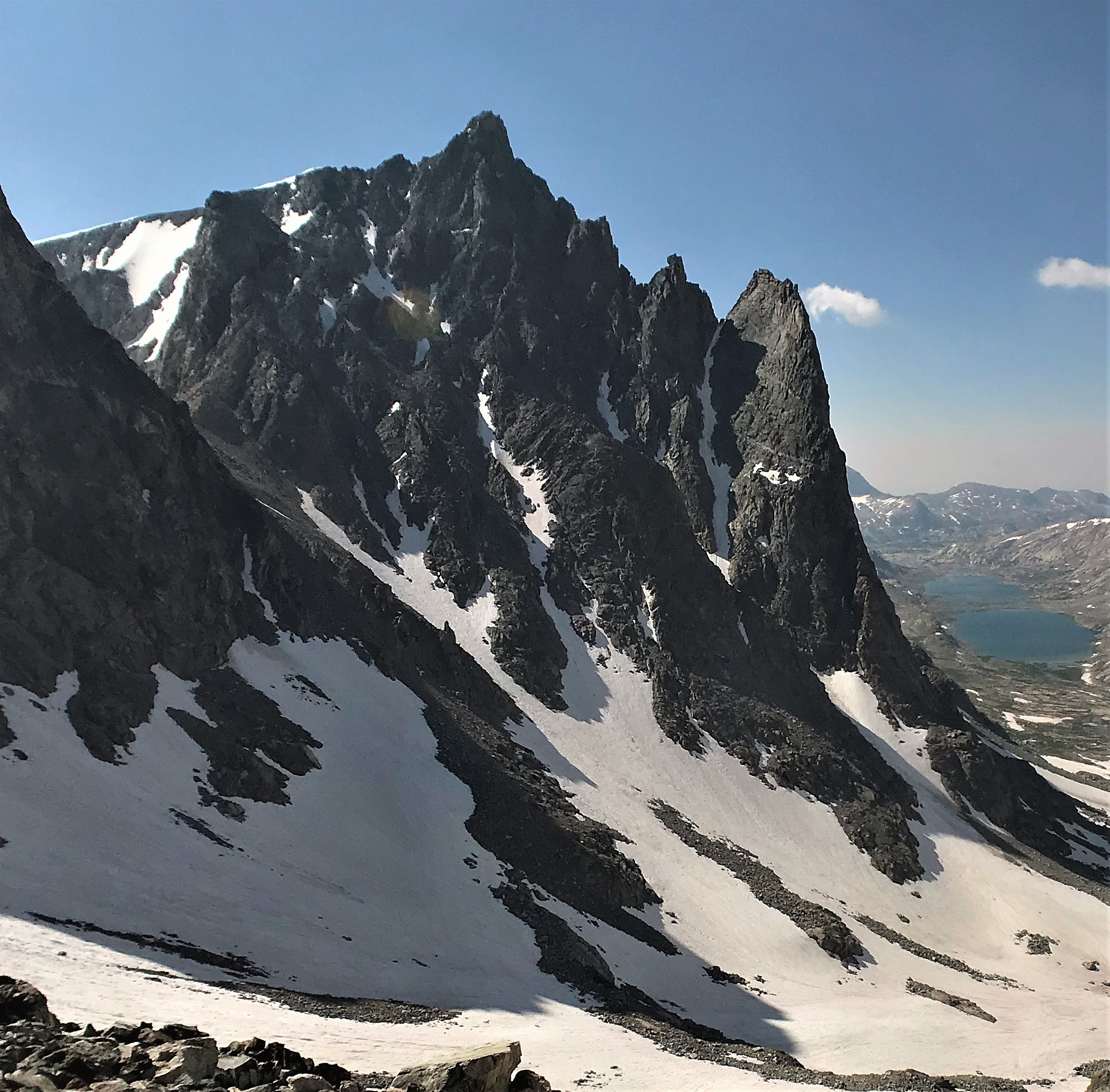
- North aspect

Highest point
- Elevation: 13,620 ft (4,150 m)
- Prominence: 820 ft (250 m)
- Coordinates: 43°09′04″N 109°37′52″W

Geography
- Location within Wyoming Location within the United States
- Location: Sublette County, Wyoming, U.S.
- Parent range: Wind River Range
- Topo map: USGS Gannett Peak

Climbing
- First ascent: 1924 by Herman Buhl and Albert Ellingwood

Mount Helen (13,620 feet (4,150 m)) is located in the Wind River Range in the U.S. state of Wyoming. The peak is the fourth highest peak in the range and the fifth tallest in Wyoming. The summit is located in the Bridger Wilderness of Bridger-Teton National Forest, immediately west of the Continental Divide. The eastern flanks of the mountain are covered in snowfields and glaciers, including Helen and Sacagawea Glaciers, all of which are in the Fitzpatrick Wilderness of Shoshone National Forest.

== Notable Ascents ==
- 1974 Northwest Ridge of the First Tower, NCCS III F8 A1, 11 pitches. FA by Dean Hannibal, Dennis Turville and Lynn Wheeler.

== Hazards ==
Encountering bears is a concern in the Wind River Range. There are other concerns as well, including bugs, wildfires, adverse snow conditions and nighttime cold temperatures.

Importantly, there have been notable incidents, including accidental deaths, due to falls from steep cliffs (a misstep could be fatal in this class 4/5 terrain) and due to falling rocks, over the years, including 1993, 2007 (involving an experienced NOLS leader), 2015 and 2018. Other incidents include a seriously injured backpacker being airlifted near SquareTop Mountain in 2005, and a fatal hiker incident (from an apparent accidental fall) in 2006 that involved state search and rescue. The U.S. Forest Service does not offer updated aggregated records on the official number of fatalities in the Wind River Range.
