= Lone Eagle Peak =

Mountain in the American state of Colorado

- Location within Colorado

Highest point
- Elevation: 11,946 ft (3,641 m)
- Coordinates: 40°04′17″N 105°39′37″W

Geography
- Location: Grand County, Colorado, U.S.
- Parent range: Front Range, Indian Peaks
- Topo map(s): USGS 7.5' topographic map Monarch Lake, Colorado

Lone Eagle Peak is a mountain summit in the Indian Peaks of the Front Range of the Rocky Mountains of North America. The 11,946-foot (3,641 m) peak is located in the Indian Peaks Wilderness of Arapaho National Forest, 12.4 miles (19.9 km) northeast by north (bearing 37°) of the Town of Fraser in Grand County, Colorado, United States. Lone Eagle Peak was named in honor of Charles Lindbergh.

== Historical names ==
- Lindbergh Peak
- Lone Eagle Peak – 1961
- Mount Lindbergh

== See also ==
- List of the most prominent summits of Colorado
- List of Colorado county high points
