= Turret Peak (Colorado) =

Mountain in Colorado, United States

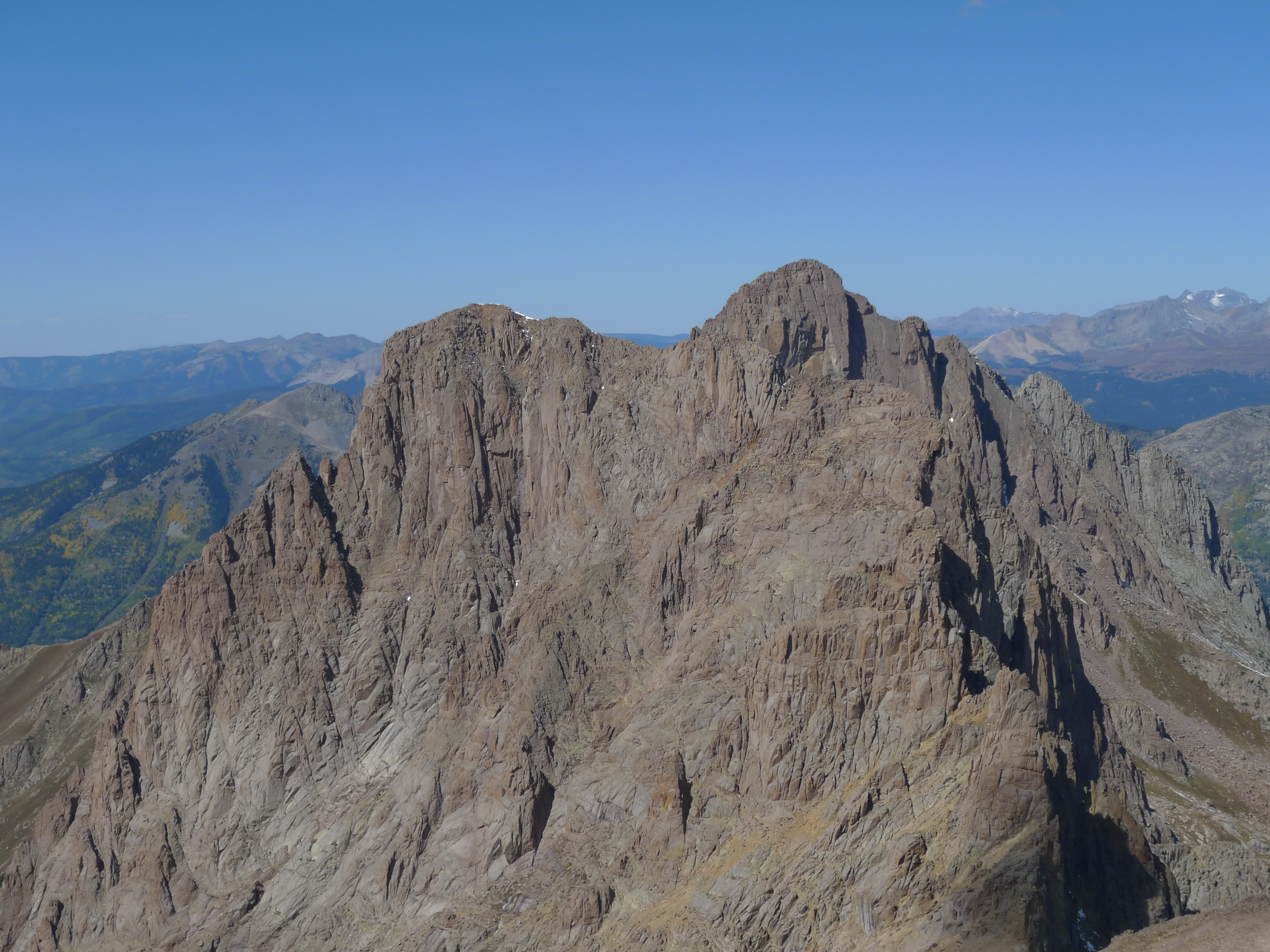
- Turret Peak (left) and Pigeon Peak (behind, right)

Highest point
- Elevation: 13,841 ft (4,219 m)
- Prominence: 735 ft (224 m)
- Parent peak: Pigeon Peak
- Isolation: 0.50 mi (0.80 km)
- Coordinates: 37°37′39″N 107°38′23″W

Geography
- Location within Colorado
- Location: La Plata County, Colorado, U.S.
- Parent range: San Juan Mountains, Needle Mountains
- Topo map(s): USGS 7.5' topographic map Snowdon Peak, Colorado

Turret Peak is a high peak of the Needle Mountains, a subrange of the San Juan Mountains in the southwestern part of the US State of Colorado. It rises on the east side of the Animas River, 0.5 miles (0.80 km) southeast of Pigeon Peak. It is located in the Weminuche Wilderness, part of the San Juan National Forest.

Turret Peak is the 89th highest independent peak in Colorado.

== Climate ==
According to the Köppen climate classification system, the mountain is located in an alpine subarctic climate zone with cold, snowy winters, and cool to warm summers. Due to its altitude, it receives precipitation all year, as snow in winter, and as thunderstorms in summer, with a dry period in late spring.

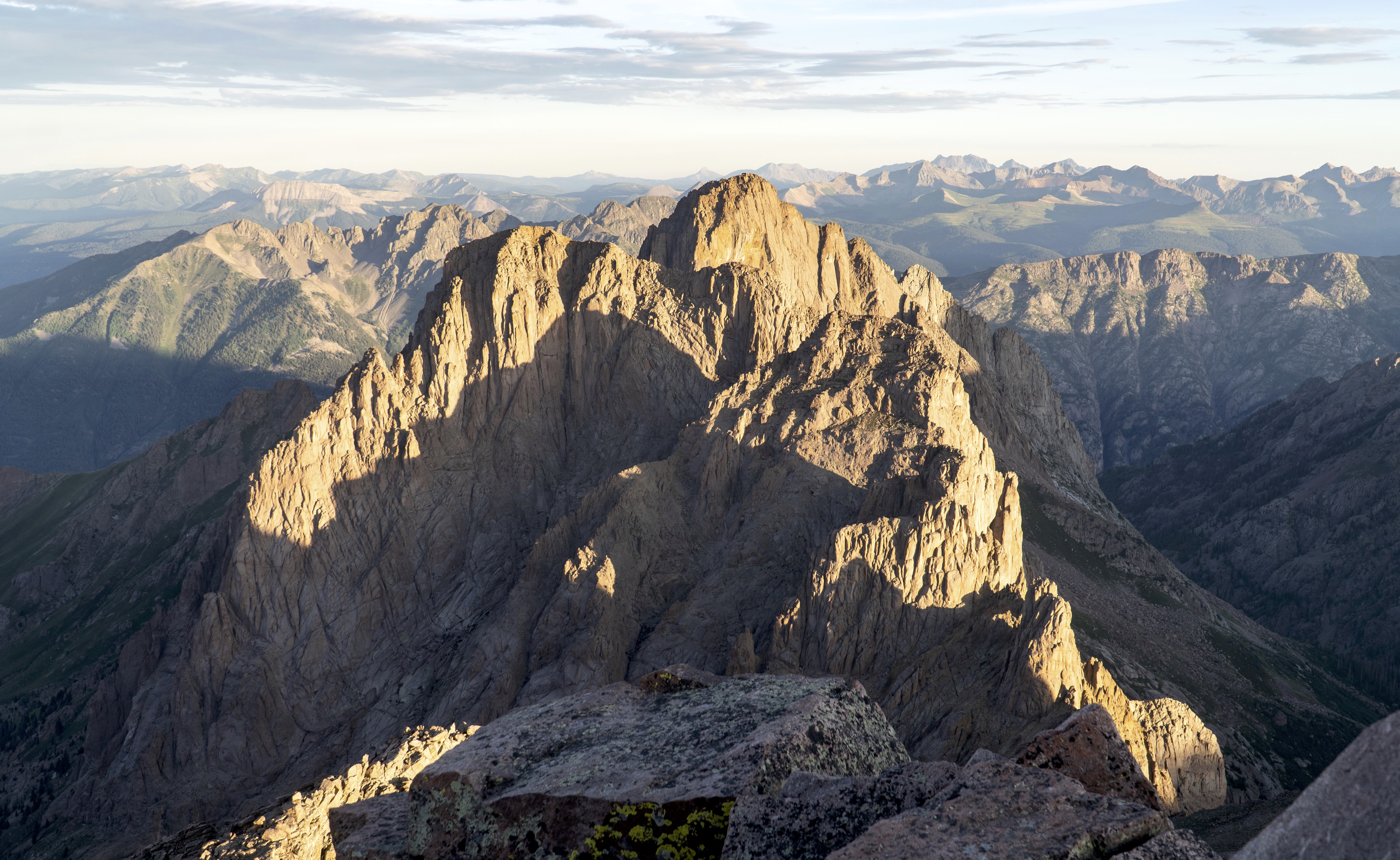
Turret and Pigeon Peaks

== See also ==
- List of Colorado mountain ranges
- List of Colorado mountain summits
  - List of Colorado fourteeners
  - List of Colorado 4000 meter prominent summits
  - List of the most prominent summits of Colorado
- List of Colorado county high points
