= Sunshine Mountain (Hinsdale County, Colorado) =

Mountain in the American state of Colorado

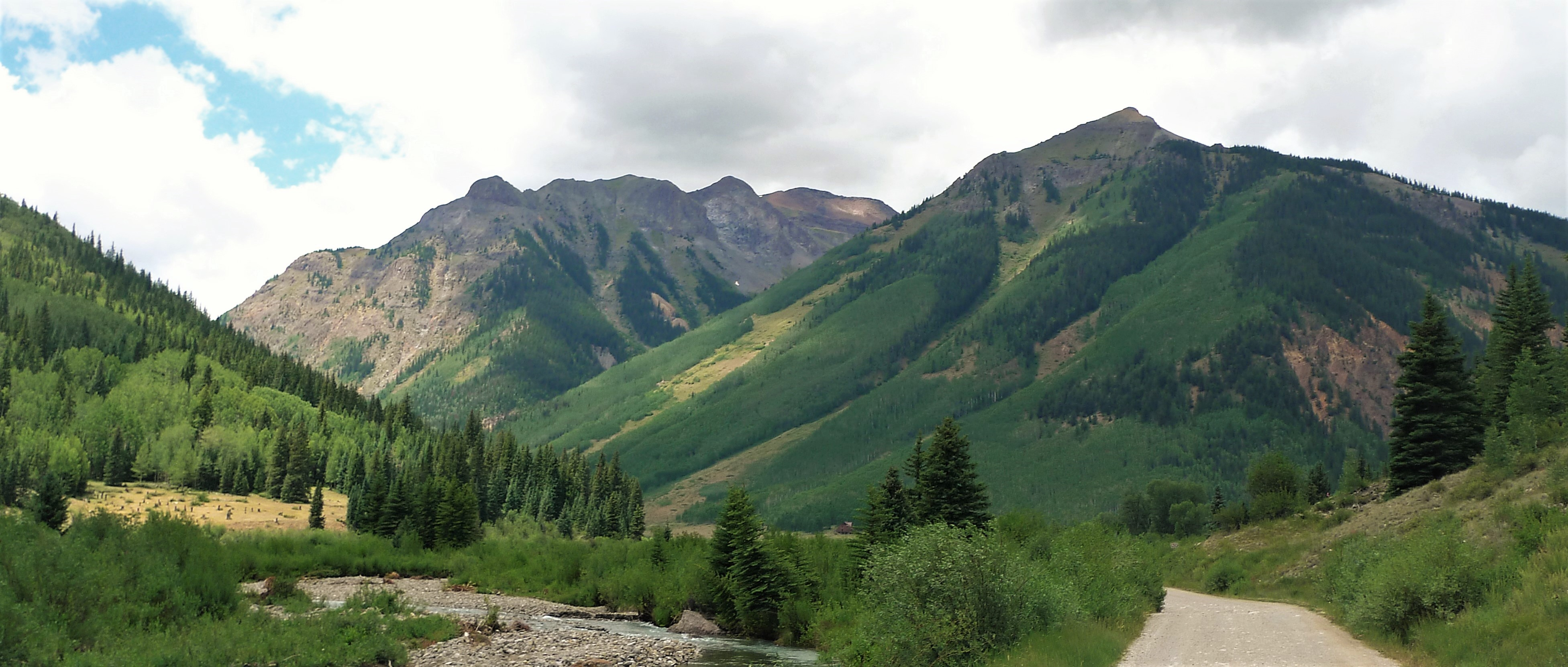
- East aspect

Highest point
- Elevation: 13,329 ft (4,063 m)
- Prominence: 1,088 ft (332 m)
- Parent peak: Handies Peak (14,048 ft)
- Isolation: 2.46 mi (3.96 km)
- Coordinates: 38°00′04″N 107°30′43″W

Geography
- Location within Colorado Location within the United States
- Country: United States
- State: Colorado
- County: Hinsdale
- Parent range: Rocky Mountains; San Juan Mountains
- Topo map: USGS Wetterhorn Peak

Climbing
- Easiest route: class 2

Sunshine Mountain is a 13,329-foot-elevation (4,063-meter) summit in Hinsdale County, Colorado, United States.

== Description ==
Sunshine Mountain is set west of the Continental Divide in the San Juan Mountains which are a subrange of the Rocky Mountains. It is located nine miles (14 km) east of the community of Ouray and 2.5 miles (4.0 km) west of ghost town Capitol City on land administered by the Bureau of Land Management. Sunshine Mountain is the highest point of the American Flats Wilderness Study Area. Precipitation runoff from the mountain drains into Henson Creek which is part of the Gunnison River watershed. Topographic relief is significant as the summit rises 3,500 feet (1,100 meters) above Henson Creek in two miles (3.2 km). Access to the mountain is via the Alpine Loop Back Country Byway. The mountain's toponym has been officially adopted by the United States Board on Geographic Names. This Sunshine Mountain should not be confused with Sunshine Mountain in San Miguel County, nor Sunshine Peak in Hinsdale County.

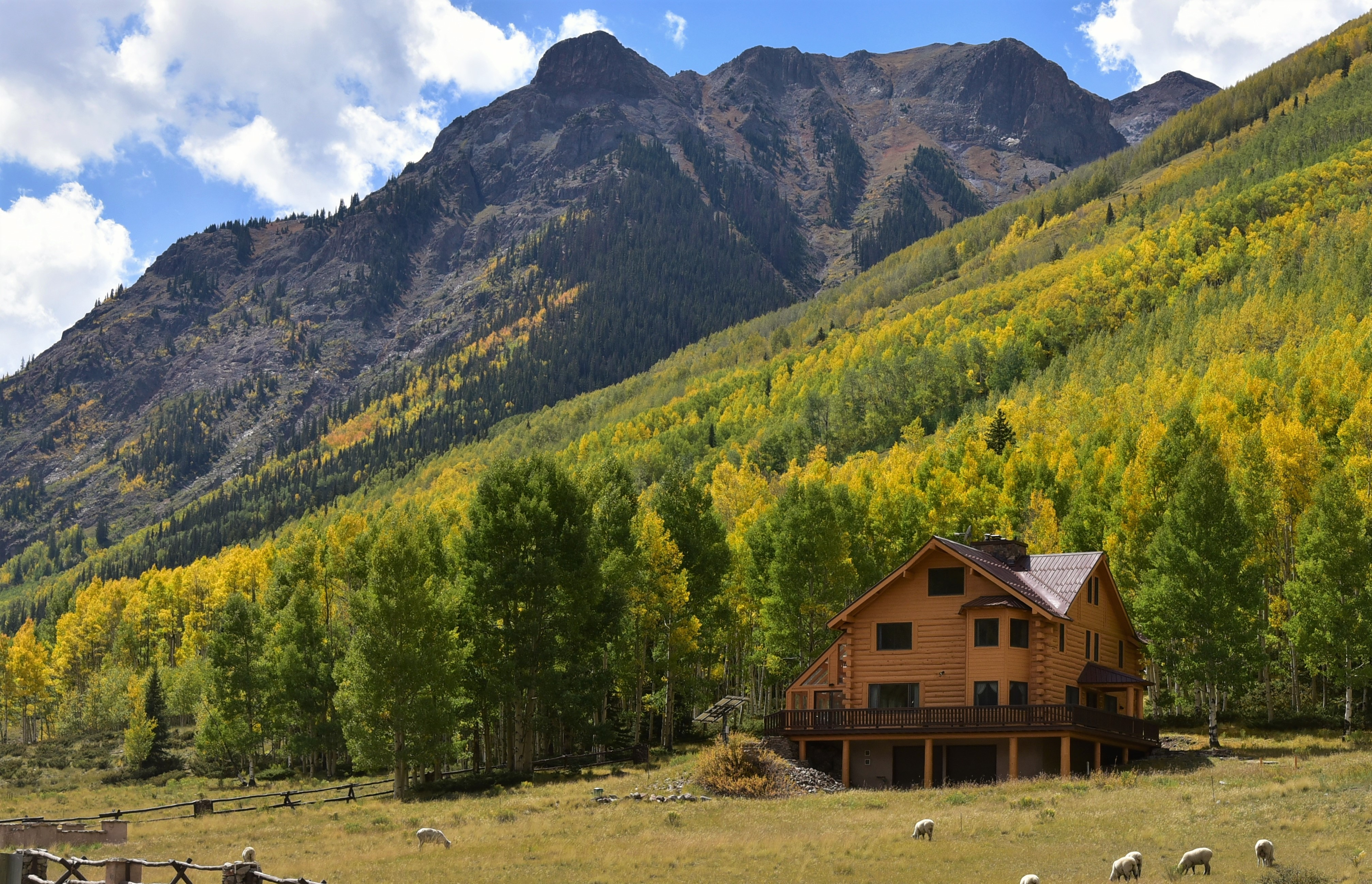
Sunshine Mountain

== Climate ==
According to the Köppen climate classification system, Sunshine Mountain is located in an alpine subarctic climate zone with cold, snowy winters, and cool to warm summers. Due to its altitude, it receives precipitation all year, as snow in winter and as thunderstorms in summer, with a dry period in late spring. Hikers can expect afternoon rain, hail, and lightning from the seasonal monsoon in late July and August.

== See also ==
- Mountains of Hinsdale County, Colorado
- Thirteener
