= Tabeguache Peak =

Mountain in the state of Colorado, United States

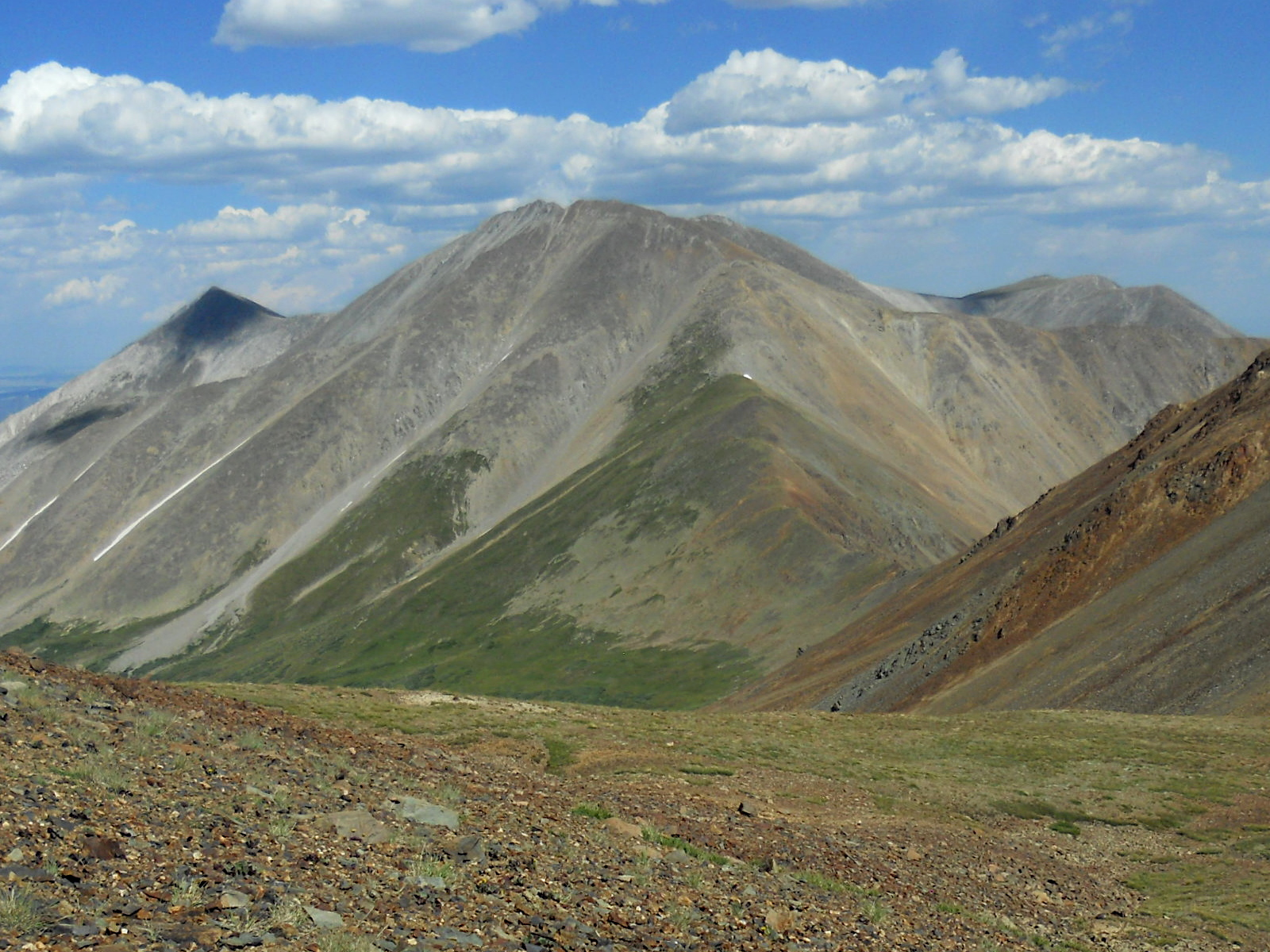
- Tabeguache Peak viewed from the west

Highest point
- Elevation: 14,157.0 ft (4,315.1 m); NAPGD2022
- Prominence: 455 ft (139 m)
- Isolation: 0.75 mi (1.21 km)
- Listing: Colorado Fourteener 25th
- Coordinates: 38°37′32″N 106°15′03″W

Geography
- Location within Colorado
- Location: Chaffee County, Colorado, U.S.
- Parent range: Sawatch Range
- Topo map(s): USGS 7.5' topographic map Saint Elmo, Colorado

Climbing
- Easiest route: Via Mt. Shavano: Hike, class 2

Tabeguache Peak is one of the fourteeners of the US state of Colorado. It is a near neighbor of the higher peak Mount Shavano, which lies approximately 1/2 mile (approximately 1 km) to the southeast. According to William Bright an American Linguist specialized in Native American and South Asian languages and descriptive linguistics it is pronounced "TAB-uh-wahch" (/tæbəwɑːtʃ/). According to Mountaineer Louis Dawson the name is pronounced "tab-uh-wash," with the accent on the first syllable. It lies just east of the Continental Divide and just west of the Arkansas River, in the south-central part of the Sawatch Range. It is located within the San Isabel National Forest and is in Chaffee County.

The mountain is named for the Tabeguache band of the Utes. "Tabaguache" means 'People of Sun Mountain', from "Tava" meaning 'sun.'

== Climbing ==
It is frequently climbed with its neighbor Mount Shavano. The standard route combining both peaks is rated Class 2.

== Climate ==
Climate data for Tabeguache Peak 38.6267 N, 106.2516 W, Elevation: 13,648 ft (4,160 m) (1991–2020 normals)
Month	Jan	Feb	Mar	Apr	May	Jun	Jul	Aug	Sep	Oct	Nov	Dec	Year
Mean daily maximum °F (°C)	22.1 (−5.5)	21.5 (−5.8)	26.4 (−3.1)	31.6 (−0.2)	40.4 (4.7)	52.2 (11.2)	57.5 (14.2)	55.4 (13.0)	49.4 (9.7)	39.2 (4.0)	28.6 (−1.9)	22.4 (−5.3)	37.2 (2.9)
Daily mean °F (°C)	10.4 (−12.0)	9.5 (−12.5)	13.9 (−10.1)	18.7 (−7.4)	27.4 (−2.6)	38.0 (3.3)	43.4 (6.3)	42.0 (5.6)	36.0 (2.2)	26.6 (−3.0)	17.4 (−8.1)	11.0 (−11.7)	24.5 (−4.2)
Mean daily minimum °F (°C)	−1.3 (−18.5)	−2.5 (−19.2)	1.4 (−17.0)	5.8 (−14.6)	14.4 (−9.8)	23.7 (−4.6)	29.4 (−1.4)	28.5 (−1.9)	22.7 (−5.2)	13.9 (−10.1)	6.2 (−14.3)	−0.4 (−18.0)	11.8 (−11.2)
Average precipitation inches (mm)	3.22 (82)	3.27 (83)	3.52 (89)	4.28 (109)	2.84 (72)	1.23 (31)	2.88 (73)	2.49 (63)	2.20 (56)	2.37 (60)	2.80 (71)	3.00 (76)	34.1 (865)
Source: PRISM Climate Group

== Historical names ==
- Mogwatavungwantsingwu
- Mount Tabequache
- Tabeguache Mountain
- Tageguache Peak – 1982

== See also ==
- List of mountain peaks of Colorado
  - List of Colorado fourteeners
