= Sunshine Peak =

Mountain in Colorado, United States

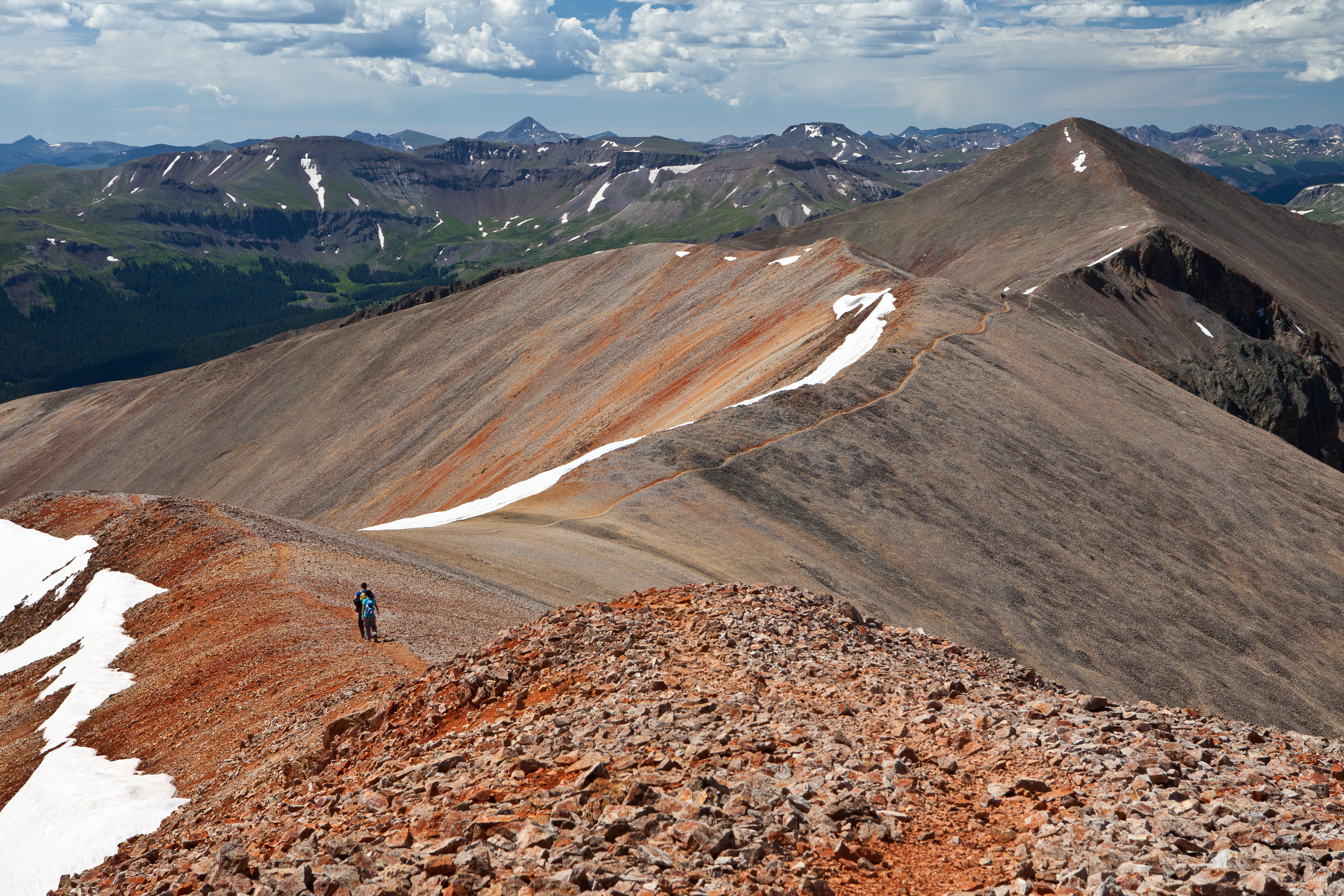
- Sunshine Peak (upper right corner) seen from Redcloud Peak

Highest point
- Elevation: 14,004.5 ft (4,268.6 m); NAPGD2022
- Prominence: 501 ft (153 m)
- Parent peak: Redcloud Peak
- Isolation: 1.27 mi (2.04 km)
- Listing: Colorado Fourteener 53rd
- Coordinates: 37°55′22″N 107°25′32″W

Geography
- Location within Colorado
- Location: Hinsdale County, Colorado, U.S.
- Parent range: San Juan Mountains
- Topo map(s): USGS 7.5' topographic map Redcloud Peak, Colorado

Climbing
- Easiest route: Via Redcloud Peak: Hike, class 2

Sunshine Peak is a fourteen thousand foot mountain peak in the U.S. state of Colorado. It is located in the San Juan Mountains in Hinsdale County approximately 9 miles (14 km) south west of Lake City, and about 1 mile (1.6 km) south of Redcloud Peak. It rises on the north side of the Lake Fork of the Gunnison River.

Sunshine Peak has the distinction of being the lowest of Colorado's 53 fourteeners. It is also not particularly independent from its higher neighbor Redcloud Peak, with a topographic prominence of 481 feet (147 m) (the minimum standard for an independent fourteener is 300 feet (91 m)). However it has more and steeper local relief than many of the other fourteeners. For example, it rises 4,450 feet (1,356 m) above the townsite of Sherman to the south in only 1.2 miles (1.9 km).

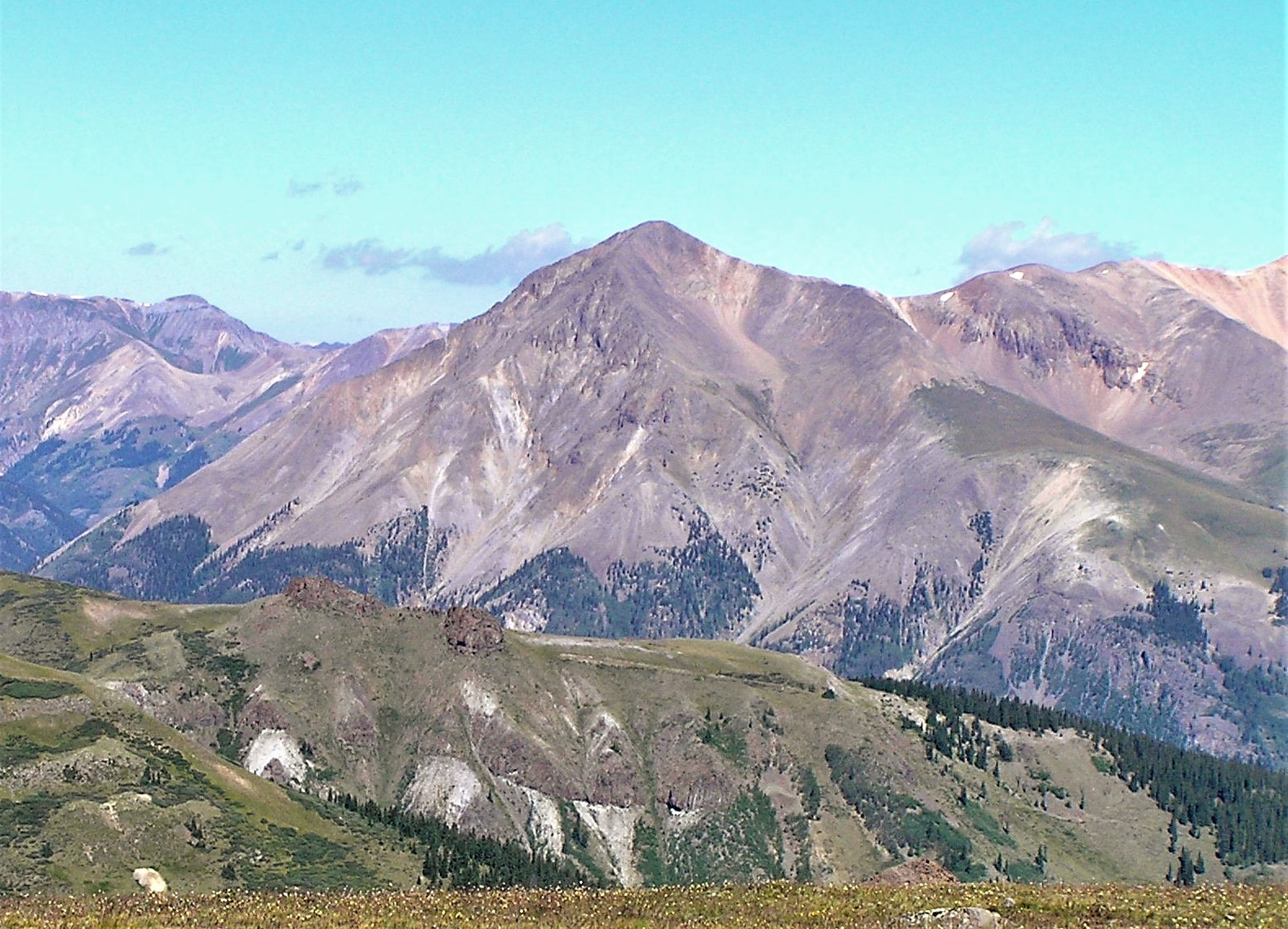
Southeast aspect

== Climate ==
According to the Köppen climate classification system, the mountain is located in an alpine subarctic climate zone with cold, snowy winters, and cool to warm summers. Due to its altitude, it receives precipitation all year, as snow in winter, and as thunderstorms in summer, with a dry period in late spring.

== See also ==
- List of mountain peaks of Colorado
  - List of Colorado fourteeners
- Sunshine Mountain (Hinsdale County, Colorado)
