= Ellingwood Point =

Mountain in Colorado, United States

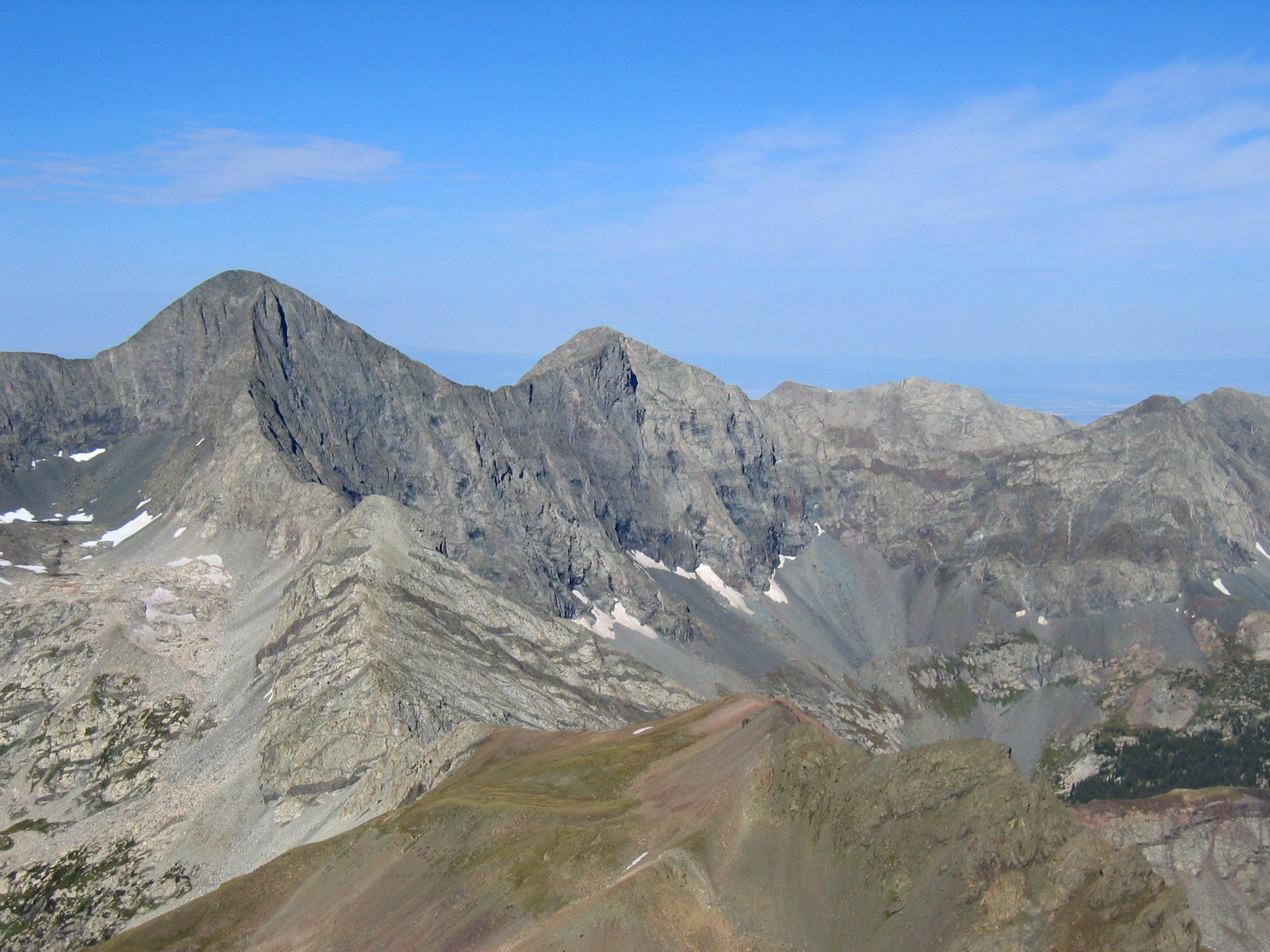
- View of Blanca Peak (left) and Ellingwood Point (center) from summit of Mount Lindsey

Highest point
- Elevation: 14,054.9 ft (4,283.9 m); NAPGD2022
- Prominence: 374 ft (114 m)
- Parent peak: Blanca Peak
- Isolation: 0.52 mi (0.84 km)
- Listing: Colorado Fourteener 42nd
- Coordinates: 37°34′57″N 105°29′33″W

Geography
- Location within Colorado
- Location: Alamosa and Huerfano counties, Colorado, United States
- Parent range: Sangre de Cristo Range, Sierra Blanca Massif
- Topo map(s): USGS 7.5' topographic map Blanca Peak, Colorado

Climbing
- Easiest route: South Face: Difficult Hike, class 2

Ellingwood Point is a high mountain summit in the Sangre de Cristo Range of the Rocky Mountains of North America. The 14,054.9-foot (4,284 m) fourteener is located on the Sierra Blanca Massif, 9.9 miles (16.0 km) north by east (bearing 7°) of the Town of Blanca, Colorado, United States, on the drainage divide separating the Rio Grande National Forest and Alamosa County from the San Isabel National Forest and Huerfano County. Ellingwood Point was named in honor of Albert Russell Ellingwood, an early pioneer of mountain climbing in the Western United States and in Colorado in particular.

== Mountain ==
Ellingwood Point only barely qualifies as an independent peak under the 300-foot (91 m) topographic prominence cutoff which is standard in Colorado. It is also quite close to its parent peak, Blanca Peak. Hence its inclusion in fourteener lists has been somewhat controversial. However most authorities do consider it a true fourteener.

== Names ==
- Ellingwood Peak
- Ellingwood Point – 1972

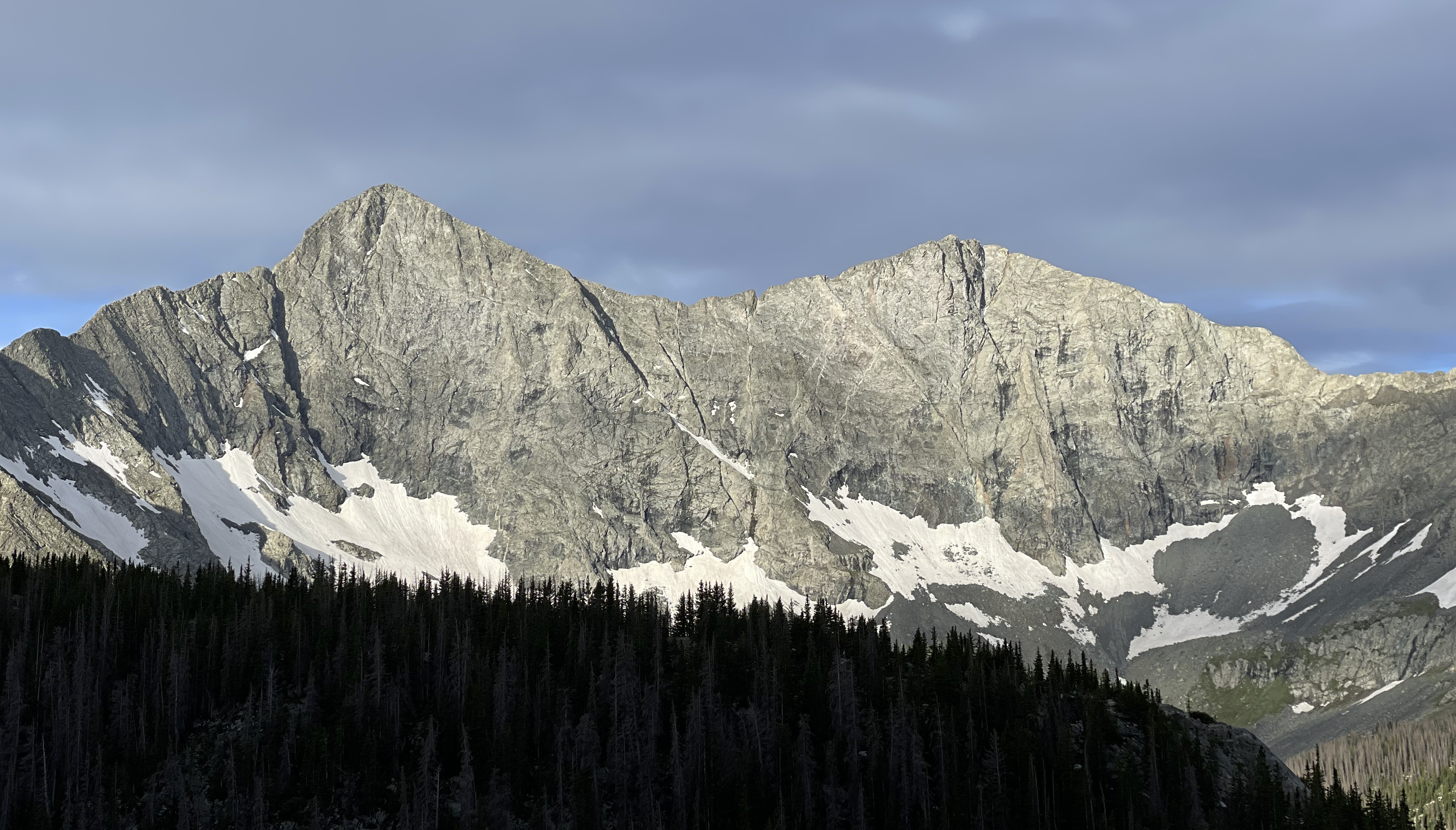
Blanca Peak and Ellingwood Point (right) from northeast

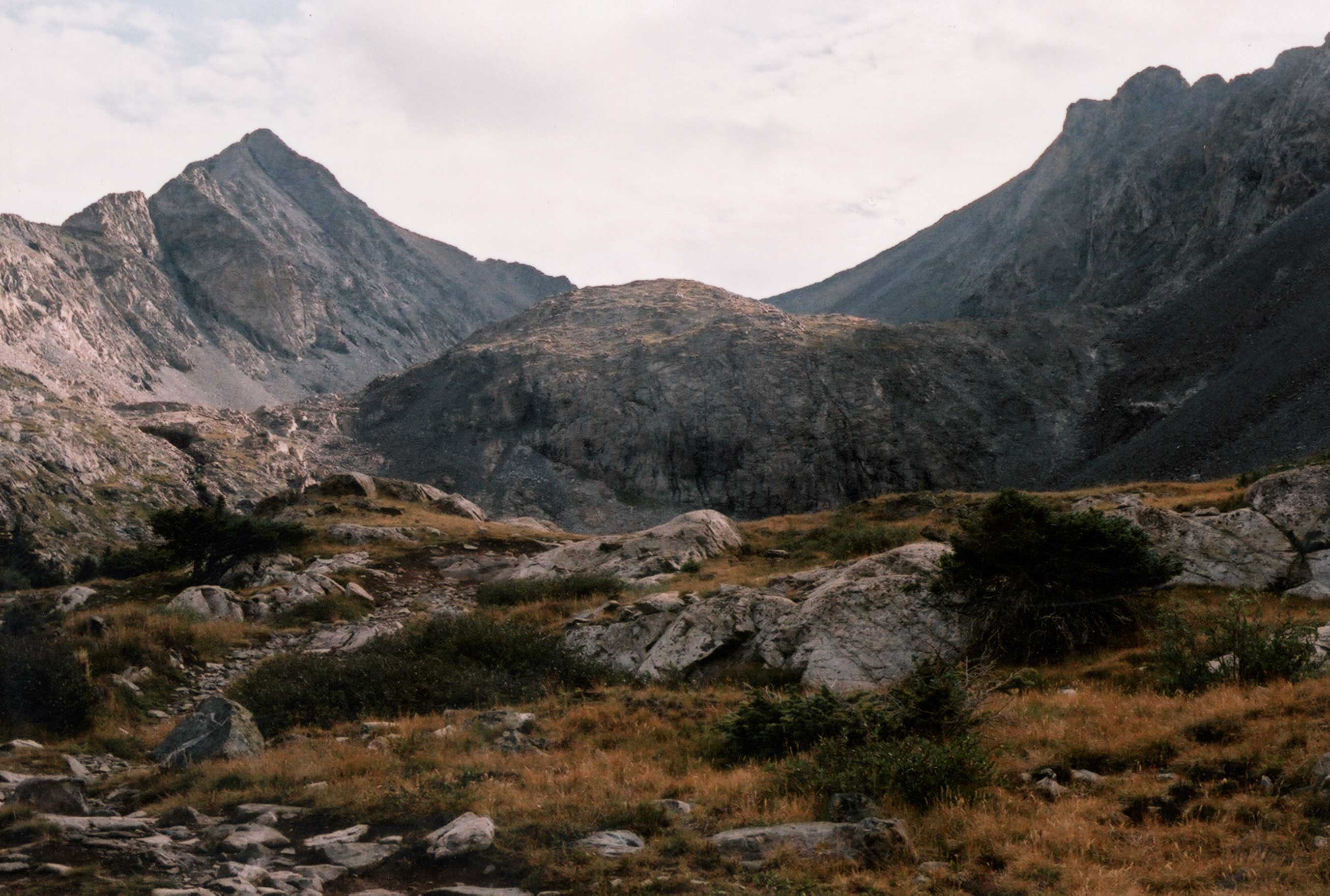
A view of Ellingwood Point and Blanca Peak from just above the Blue Lakes

== Climate ==
According to the Köppen climate classification system, the mountain is located in an alpine subarctic climate zone with cold, snowy winters, and cool to warm summers. Due to its altitude, it receives precipitation all year, as snow in winter, and as thunderstorms in summer, with a dry period in late spring.

== See also ==
- List of mountain peaks of Colorado
  - List of Colorado fourteeners
