= Whitecross Mountain =

Mountain in the American state of Colorado

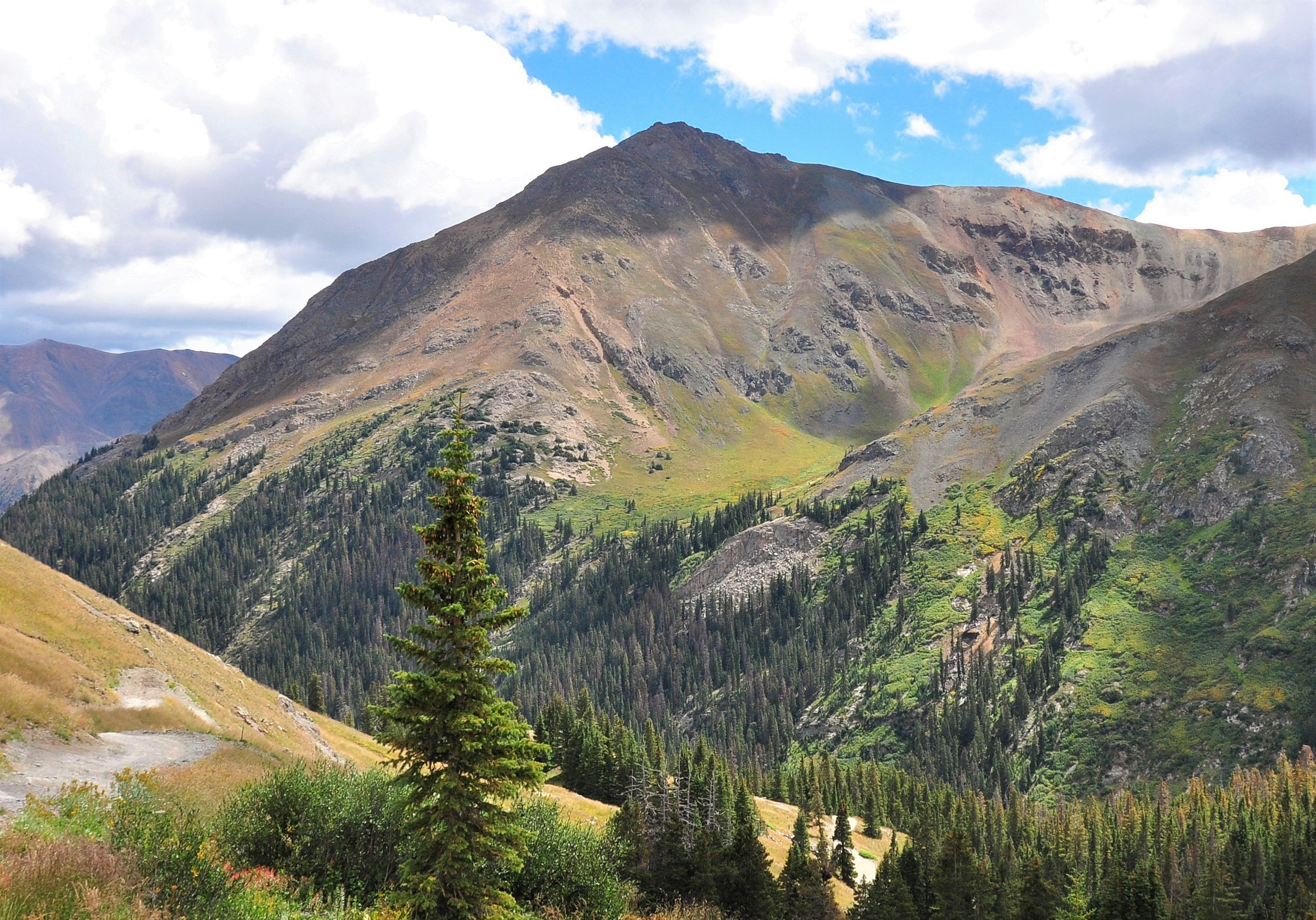
- West aspect

Highest point
- Elevation: 13,553 ft (4,131 m)
- Prominence: 573 ft (175 m)
- Parent peak: Handies Peak (14,048 ft)
- Isolation: 1.37 mi (2.20 km)
- Coordinates: 37°55′51″N 107°29′36″W

Geography
- Location within Colorado Location within the United States
- Country: United States
- State: Colorado
- County: Hinsdale
- Parent range: Rocky Mountains; San Juan Mountains
- Topo map: USGS Redcloud Peak

Climbing
- Easiest route: class 2

Whitecross Mountain is a 13,553-foot-elevation (4,131-meter) summit in Hinsdale County, Colorado, United States.

== Description ==
Whitecross Mountain is set six miles (9.7 km) west of the Continental Divide in the San Juan Mountains which are a subrange of the Rocky Mountains. It is located 1.36 miles (2.19 km) north-northeast of Handies Peak on land administered by the Bureau of Land Management. Whitecross Mountain is the seventh-highest peak in the Handies Peak Wilderness Study Area. Precipitation runoff from the mountain drains into the Lake Fork of the Gunnison River. Topographic relief is significant as the summit rises 2,800 feet (850 meters) above Lake Fork in 0.8 mile (1.3 km). The mountain's toponym has been officially adopted by the United States Board on Geographic Names. The mountain's name is attributable to white quartzite in the shape of a cross near the summit.

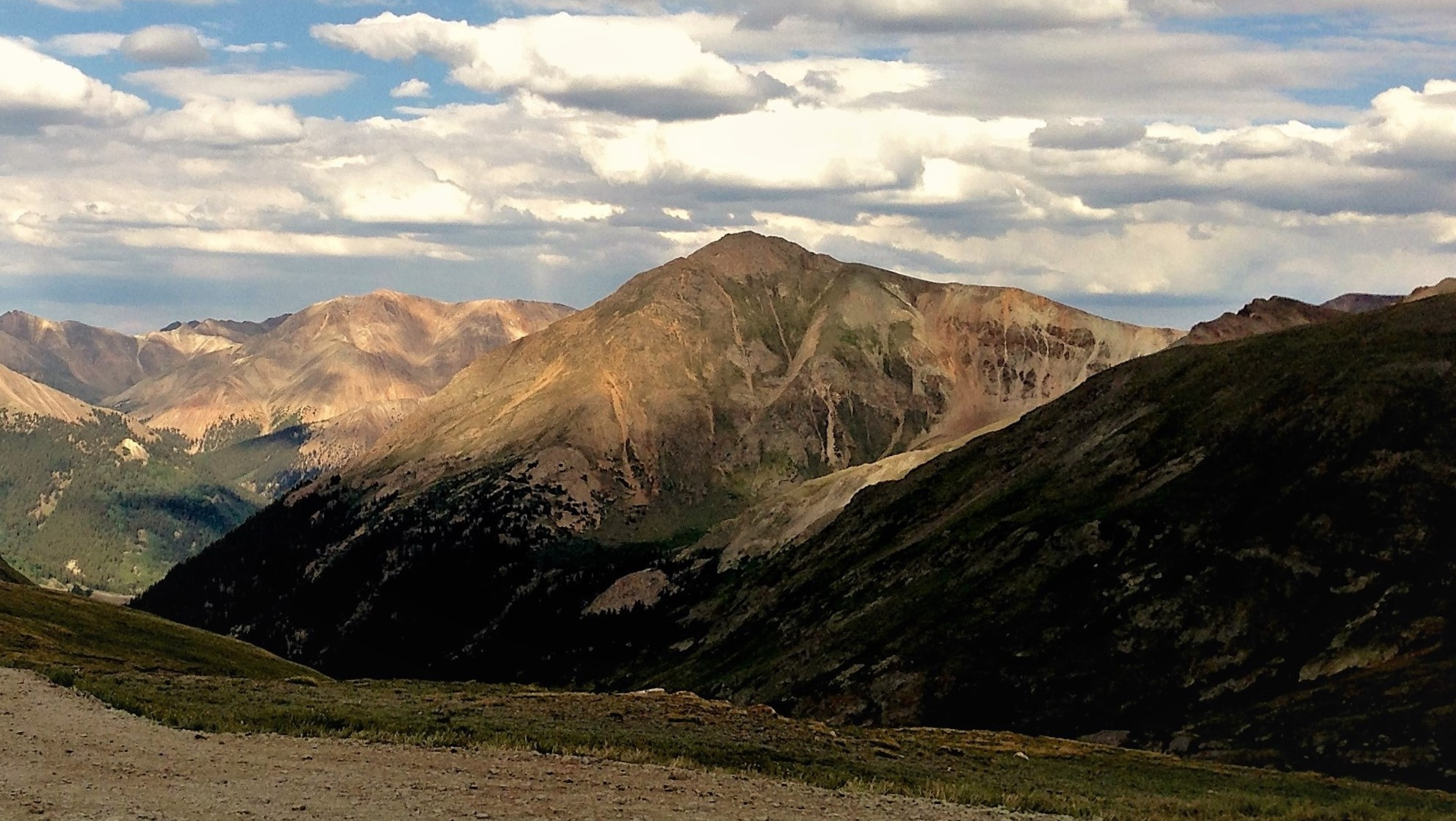
Whitecross Mountain from Cinnamon Pass

== Climate ==
According to the Köppen climate classification system, Whitecross Mountain is located in an alpine subarctic climate zone with cold, snowy winters, and cool to warm summers. Due to its altitude, it receives precipitation all year, as snow in winter and as thunderstorms in summer, with a dry period in late spring. Hikers can expect afternoon rain, hail, and lightning from the seasonal monsoon in late July and August.

== See also ==
- Mountains of Hinsdale County, Colorado
- Thirteener
