= List of Colorado fourteeners =

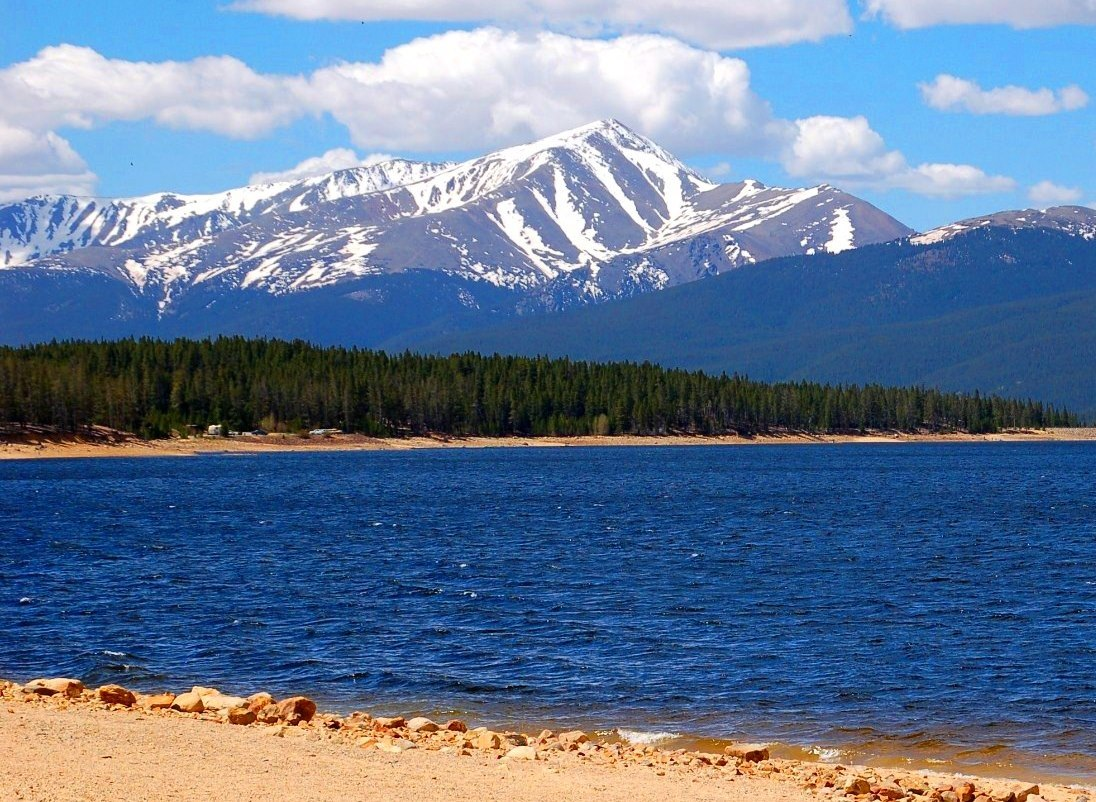
Mount Elbert in the Sawatch Range is the highest summit of the Rocky Mountains and the highest point in the U.S. State of Colorado.

This is a list of mountain peaks in the U.S. state of Colorado that exceed 14,000 feet (4267.2 meters) of elevation.

In the mountaineering parlance of the Western United States, a fourteener is a mountain peak with an elevation of at least 14,000 feet. This is a complete list of the 53 fourteeners in the U.S. State of Colorado with at least 300 feet (91.44 meters) of topographic prominence. See the main fourteener article, which has a list of all of the fourteeners in the United States, for some information about how such lists are determined and caveats about elevation and ranking accuracy.

The summit of a mountain or hill may be measured in three principal ways:

1. The topographic elevation of a summit measures the height of the summit above a geodetic sea level. (Note: All elevations in the 48 states of the contiguous United States include an elevation adjustment from the National Geodetic Vertical Datum of 1929 (NGVD 29) to the North American Vertical Datum of 1988 (NAVD 88). For further information, please see this United States National Geodetic Survey note.) (Note: If the elevation or prominence of a summit is calculated as a range of values, the arithmetic mean is shown.)
2. The topographic prominence of a summit is a measure of how high the summit rises above its surroundings. (Note: The topographic prominence of a summit is the topographic elevation difference between the summit and its highest or key col to a higher summit. The summit may be near its key col or quite far away. The key col for Denali in Alaska is the Isthmus of Rivas in Nicaragua, 7642 kilometers (4749 miles) away.) (Note: This list of the 53 Colorado fourteeners includes 28 peaks with over 14,000 feet of elevation but less than 1640 feet of topographic prominence: Torreys Peak, Quandary Peak, Mount Shavano, Mount Belford, Crestone Needle, Mount Bross, Kit Carson Mountain, Tabeguache Peak, Mount Oxford, Mount Democrat, Snowmass Mountain, Windom Peak, Challenger Point, Mount Columbia, Missouri Mountain, Humboldt Peak, Mount Bierstadt, Sunlight Peak, Ellingwood Point, Mount Lindsey, Little Bear Peak, Mount Sherman, Redcloud Peak, Pyramid Peak, Wilson Peak, Wetterhorn Peak, Huron Peak, and Sunshine Peak. The list of the 55 Colorado major 4000-meter summits includes 30 peaks with more than 500 meters of topographic prominence and between 4000 and 4267 meters in elevation: Grizzly Peak, Mount Ouray, Vermilion Peak, Mount Silverheels, Rio Grande Pyramid, Bald Mountain, Mount Oso, Mount Jackson, Bard Peak, West Spanish Peak, Mount Powell, Hagues Peak, Tower Mountain, Treasure Mountain, North Arapaho Peak, Parry Peak, Bill Williams Peak, Sultan Mountain, Mount Herard, West Buffalo Peak, Summit Peak, Middle Peak, Antora Peak, Henry Mountain, Hesperus Mountain, Jacque Peak, Bennett Peak, Conejos Peak, Twilight Peak, and South River Peak. The first 25 summits on the 4000-meter list are included on both lists: Mount Elbert, Mount Massive, Mount Harvard, La Plata Peak, Blanca Peak, Uncompahgre Peak, Crestone Peak, Mount Lincoln, Castle Peak, Grays Peak, Mount Antero, Mount Evans, Longs Peak, Mount Wilson, Mount Princeton, Mount Yale, Maroon Peak, Mount Sneffels, Capitol Peak, Pikes Peak, Mount Eolus, Handies Peak, Culebra Peak, San Luis Peak, and Mount of the Holy Cross.)
3. The topographic isolation (or radius of dominance) of a summit measures how far the summit lies from its nearest point of equal elevation. (Note: The topographic isolation of a summit is the great-circle distance to its nearest point of equal elevation.)

== Fourteeners ==
The following sortable table comprises the 53 Colorado summits with at least 14,000 feet (4267 meters) of elevation and at least 300 feet (91.44 meters) of topographic prominence.

The Colorado Fourteeners
Rank	Mountain Peak	Mountain Range	Elevation	Prominence	Isolation	Location
1	Mount Elbert (Note: The summit of Mount Elbert is the highest point of the Rocky Mountains and the U.S. State of Colorado.)	Sawatch Range	4401.2 m 14,440 ft	2772 m 9,093 ft	1,079 km 671 mi	39°07′04″N 106°26′43″W
2	Mount Massive (Note: Mount Massive is the second highest summit of the Rocky Mountains.) (Note: The elevation of Mount Massive includes an adjustment of +2.087 m (6.85 ft) from NGVD 29 to NAVD 88.)	Sawatch Range	4398 m 14,428 ft	598 m 1,961 ft	8.14 km 5.06 mi	39°11′15″N 106°28′33″W
3	Mount Harvard (Note: The summit of Mount Harvard is the highest point of the Collegiate Peaks.)	Sawatch Range	4395.6 m 14,421 ft	719 m 2,360 ft	24 km 14.93 mi	38°55′28″N 106°19′15″W
4	Blanca Peak (Note: The summit of Blanca Peak is the highest point of the Sangre de Cristo Range.) (Note: The elevation of Blanca Peak includes an adjustment of +1.755 m (5.76 ft) from NGVD 29 to NAVD 88.)	Sangre de Cristo Range	4374 m 14,351 ft	1623 m 5,326 ft	166.4 km 103.4 mi	37°34′39″N 105°29′08″W
5	La Plata Peak (Note: The elevation of La Plata Peak includes an adjustment of +1.983 m (6.51 ft) from NGVD 29 to NAVD 88.)	Sawatch Range	4372 m 14,343 ft	560 m 1,836 ft	10.11 km 6.28 mi	39°01′46″N 106°28′22″W
6	Uncompahgre Peak (Note: The summit of Uncompahgre Peak is the highest point of the San Juan Mountains.)	San Juan Mountains	4365 m 14,321 ft	1304 m 4,277 ft	136.9 km 85.1 mi	38°04′18″N 107°27′44″W
7	Crestone Peak (Note: The elevation of Crestone Peak includes an adjustment of +1.76 m (5.77 ft) from NGVD 29 to NAVD 88.)	Sangre de Cristo Range	4359 m 14,300 ft	1388 m 4,554 ft	44.1 km 27.4 mi	37°58′01″N 105°35′08″W
8	Mount Lincoln (Note: The summit of Mount Lincoln is the highest point of the Mosquito Range.)	Mosquito Range	4356.5 m 14,293 ft	1177 m 3,862 ft	36.3 km 22.6 mi	39°21′05″N 106°06′42″W
9	Castle Peak (Note: The summit of Castle Peak is the highest point of the Elk Mountains.)	Elk Mountains	4352.2 m 14,279 ft	721 m 2,365 ft	33.7 km 20.9 mi	39°00′35″N 106°51′41″W
10	Grays Peak (Note: The summit of Grays Peak is the highest point of the Front Range and the Continental Divide of North America.)	Front Range	4352 m 14,278 ft	844 m 2,770 ft	40.3 km 25 mi	39°38′02″N 105°49′03″W
11	Mount Antero (Note: The summit of Mount Antero is the highest point of the southern Sawatch Range.)	Sawatch Range	4351.4 m 14,276 ft	763 m 2,503 ft	28.6 km 17.75 mi	38°40′27″N 106°14′46″W
12	Torreys Peak	Front Range	4351 m 14,275 ft	171 m 560 ft	1.05 km 0.65 mi	39°38′34″N 105°49′16″W
13	Quandary Peak	Mosquito Range	4349.9 m 14,271 ft	343 m 1,125 ft	5.09 km 3.16 mi	39°23′50″N 106°06′23″W
14	Mount Blue Sky (Note: The summit elevation of Mount Blue Sky includes a vertical offset of +1.798 m (5.9 ft) from the station benchmark.)	Front Range	4350 m 14,271 ft	844 m 2,770 ft	15.76 km 9.79 mi	39°35′18″N 105°38′38″W
15	Longs Peak (Note: The summit of Longs Peak is the highest point of the northern Front Range.)	Front Range	4346 m 14,259 ft	896 m 2,940 ft	70.2 km 43.6 mi	40°15′18″N 105°36′54″W
16	Mount Wilson (Note: The summit of Mount Wilson is the highest point of the San Miguel Mountains.) (Note: The elevation of Mount Wilson includes an adjustment of +1.899 m (6.23 ft) from NGVD 29 to NAVD 88.)	San Miguel Mountains	4344 m 14,252 ft	1227 m 4,024 ft	53.2 km 33.1 mi	37°50′21″N 107°59′30″W
17	Mount Shavano	Sawatch Range	4337.7 m 14,231 ft	493 m 1,619 ft	6.09 km 3.78 mi	38°37′09″N 106°14′21″W
18	Mount Princeton	Sawatch Range	4329.3 m 14,204 ft	664 m 2,177 ft	8.36 km 5.19 mi	38°44′57″N 106°14′33″W
19	Mount Belford	Sawatch Range	4329.1 m 14,203 ft	408 m 1,337 ft	5.31 km 3.3 mi	38°57′39″N 106°21′39″W
20	Crestone Needle (Note: The elevation of Crestone Needle includes an adjustment of +1.763 m (5.78 ft) from NGVD 29 to NAVD 88.)	Sangre de Cristo Range	4329 m 14,203 ft	139 m 457 ft	0.72 km 0.45 mi	37°57′53″N 105°34′36″W
21	Mount Yale	Sawatch Range	4328.2 m 14,200 ft	578 m 1,896 ft	8.93 km 5.55 mi	38°50′39″N 106°18′50″W
22	Mount Bross	Mosquito Range	4321.6 m 14,178 ft	95 m 312 ft	1.6 km 0.99 mi	39°20′07″N 106°06′28″W
23	Kit Carson Mountain (Note: The elevation of Kit Carson Mountain includes an adjustment of +1.773 m (5.82 ft) from NGVD 29 to NAVD 88.)	Sangre de Cristo Range	4319 m 14,171 ft	312 m 1,025 ft	2.05 km 1.27 mi	37°58′47″N 105°36′09″W
24	Maroon Peak	Elk Mountains	4317 m 14,163 ft	712 m 2,336 ft	12.97 km 8.06 mi	39°04′15″N 106°59′20″W
25	Tabeguache Peak	Sawatch Range	4316.7 m 14,162 ft	139 m 455 ft	1.21 km 0.75 mi	38°37′32″N 106°15′03″W
26	Mount Oxford (Colorado)	Collegiate Peaks	4315.9 m 14,160 ft	199 m 653 ft	1.97 km 1.22 mi	38°57′53″N 106°20′20″W
27	Mount Sneffels (Note: The summit of Mount Sneffels is the highest point of the Sneffels Range.)	Sneffels Range	4315.4 m 14,158 ft	930 m 3,050 ft	25.3 km 15.73 mi	38°00′14″N 107°47′32″W
28	Mount Democrat	Mosquito Range	4314.5 m 14,155 ft	234 m 768 ft	2.04 km 1.27 mi	39°20′23″N 106°08′24″W
29	Capitol Peak (Note: The elevation of Capitol Peak includes an adjustment of +1.991 m (6.53 ft) from NGVD 29 to NAVD 88.)	Elk Mountains	4309 m 14,137 ft	533 m 1,750 ft	11.98 km 7.44 mi	39°09′01″N 107°04′58″W
30	Pikes Peak (Note: Pikes Peak is the easternmost 14,000-foot (4267.2 m) summit of the United States. Pikes Peak was the inspiration for the lyrics of America the Beautiful.)	Front Range	4302.31 m 14,115 ft	1686 m 5,530 ft	97.8 km 60.8 mi	38°50′26″N 105°02′39″W
31	Snowmass Mountain	Elk Mountains	4297.3 m 14,099 ft	351 m 1,152 ft	3.77 km 2.34 mi	39°07′08″N 107°03′59″W
32	Windom Peak (Note: The summit of Windom Peak is the highest point of the San Juan Mountains and La Plata County, Colorado.) (Note: Mount Eolus may be higher than Windom Peak.) (Note: The elevation of Windom Peak includes an adjustment of +1.785 m (5.86 ft) from NGVD 29 to NAVD 88.)	Needle Mountains	4296 m 14,093 ft	667 m 2,187 ft	42.4 km 26.4 mi	37°37′16″N 107°35′31″W
33	Mount Eolus (Note: The elevation of Mount Eolus includes an adjustment of +1.756 m (5.76 ft) from NGVD 29 to NAVD 88.)	San Juan Mountains	4295 m 14,090 ft	312 m 1,024 ft	2.72 km 1.69 mi	37°37′18″N 107°37′22″W
34	Challenger Point (Note: The elevation of Challenger Point includes an adjustment of +1.752 m (5.75 ft) from NGVD 29 to NAVD 88.)	Sangre de Cristo Range	4294 m 14,087 ft	92 m 301 ft	0.36 km 0.22 mi	37°58′49″N 105°36′24″W
35	Mount Columbia	Sawatch Range	4290.8 m 14,077 ft	272 m 893 ft	3.05 km 1.9 mi	38°54′14″N 106°17′51″W
36	Missouri Mountain	Sawatch Range	4289.8 m 14,074 ft	258 m 847 ft	2.11 km 1.31 mi	38°56′51″N 106°22′43″W
37	Humboldt Peak (Note: The elevation of Humboldt Peak includes an adjustment of +1.79 m (5.87 ft) from NGVD 29 to NAVD 88.)	Sangre de Cristo Range	4289 m 14,070 ft	367 m 1,204 ft	2.27 km 1.41 mi	37°58′34″N 105°33′19″W
38	Mount Bierstadt	Front Range	4287 m 14,065 ft	219 m 720 ft	1.8 km 1.12 mi	39°34′57″N 105°40′08″W
39	Sunlight Peak (Note: The elevation of Sunlight Peak includes an adjustment of +1.804 m (5.92 ft) from NGVD 29 to NAVD 88.)	San Juan Mountains	4287 m 14,065 ft	122 m 399 ft	0.77 km 0.48 mi	37°37′39″N 107°35′45″W
40	Handies Peak	San Juan Mountains	4284.8 m 14,058 ft	582 m 1,908 ft	18 km 11.18 mi	37°54′47″N 107°30′16″W
41	Culebra Peak (Note: The summit of Culebra Peak is the highest point of the Culebra Range.) (Note: The elevation of Culebra Peak includes an adjustment of +1.74 m (5.71 ft) from NGVD 29 to NAVD 88.)	Culebra Range	4283 m 14,053 ft	1471 m 4,827 ft	57.1 km 35.5 mi	37°07′21″N 105°11′09″W
42	Ellingwood Point (Note: The elevation of Ellingwood Point includes an adjustment of +1.789 m (5.87 ft) from NGVD 29 to NAVD 88.)	Sangre de Cristo Range	4282 m 14,048 ft	104 m 342 ft	0.83 km 0.52 mi	37°34′57″N 105°29′34″W
43	Mount Lindsey (Note: The elevation of Mount Lindsey includes an adjustment of +1.691 m (5.55 ft) from NGVD 29 to NAVD 88.)	Sangre de Cristo Range	4282 m 14,048 ft	470 m 1,542 ft	3.64 km 2.26 mi	37°35′01″N 105°26′42″W
44	Little Bear Peak (Note: The elevation of Little Bear Peak includes an adjustment of +1.733 m (5.69 ft) from NGVD 29 to NAVD 88.)	Sangre de Cristo Range	4280 m 14,043 ft	115 m 377 ft	1.58 km 0.98 mi	37°34′00″N 105°29′50″W
45	Mount Sherman (Note: The elevation of Mount Sherman includes an adjustment of +2.029 m (6.66 ft) from NGVD 29 to NAVD 88.)	Mosquito Range	4280 m 14,043 ft	259 m 850 ft	12.97 km 8.06 mi	39°13′30″N 106°10′12″W
46	Redcloud Peak (Note: The elevation of Redcloud Peak includes an adjustment of +2.015 m (6.61 ft) from NGVD 29 to NAVD 88.)	San Juan Mountains	4280 m 14,041 ft	438 m 1,436 ft	7.9 km 4.91 mi	37°56′28″N 107°25′19″W
47	Pyramid Peak	Elk Mountains	4274.7 m 14,025 ft	499 m 1,638 ft	3.36 km 2.09 mi	39°04′18″N 106°57′01″W
48	Wilson Peak (Note: The elevation of Wilson Peak includes an adjustment of +1.877 m (6.16 ft) from NGVD 29 to NAVD 88.)	San Juan Mountains	4274 m 14,023 ft	261 m 857 ft	2.43 km 1.51 mi	37°51′37″N 107°59′05″W
49	San Luis Peak (Note: The summit of San Luis Peak is the highest point of the La Garita Mountains.)	La Garita Mountains	4273.8 m 14,022 ft	949 m 3,113 ft	43.4 km 27 mi	37°59′12″N 106°55′53″W
50	Wetterhorn Peak (Note: The elevation of Wetterhorn Peak includes an adjustment of +1.903 m (6.24 ft) from NGVD 29 to NAVD 88.)	San Juan Mountains	4274 m 14,021 ft	498 m 1,635 ft	4.45 km 2.77 mi	38°03′39″N 107°30′39″W
51	Mount of the Holy Cross (Note: The summit of Mount of the Holy Cross is the highest point of the northern Sawatch Range.) (Note: The summit elevation of Mount of the Holy Cross includes a vertical offset of +0.61 m (2 ft) from the station benchmark.)	Sawatch Range	4270.5 m 14,011 ft	644 m 2,113 ft	29.8 km 18.52 mi	39°28′00″N 106°28′54″W
52	Huron Peak	Sawatch Range	4270.2 m 14,010 ft	434 m 1,423 ft	5.16 km 3.21 mi	38°56′44″N 106°26′17″W
53	Sunshine Peak (Note: The elevation of Sunshine Peak includes an adjustment of +1.969 m (6.46 ft) from NGVD 29 to NAVD 88.)	San Juan Mountains	4269 m 14,007 ft	153 m 501 ft	2.05 km 1.27 mi	37°55′22″N 107°25′32″W

== Gallery ==
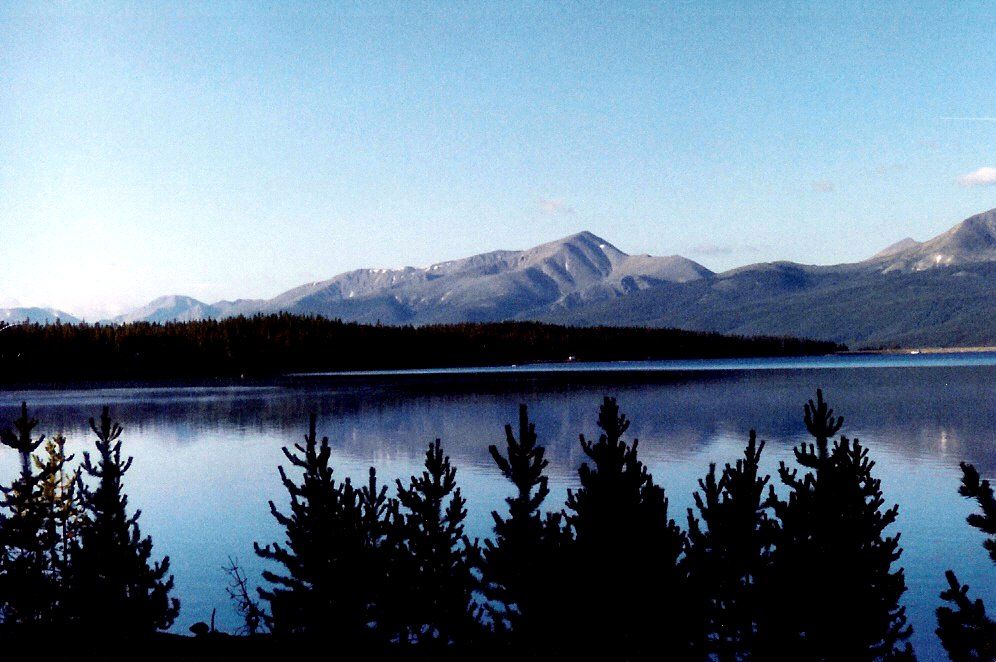
View of Mount Elbert with Turquoise Lake in the foreground.

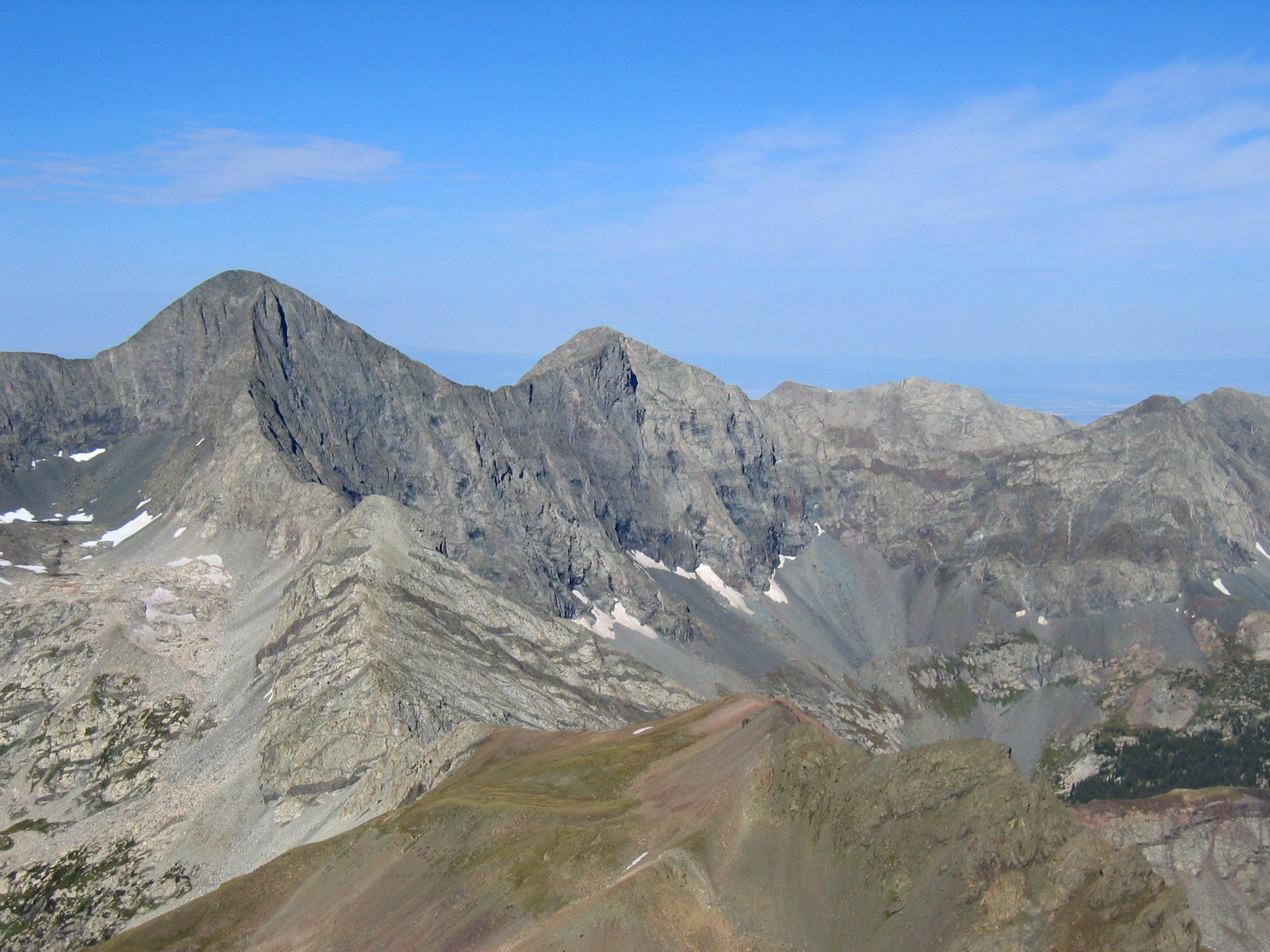
View of Blanca Peak from Mount Lindsey.

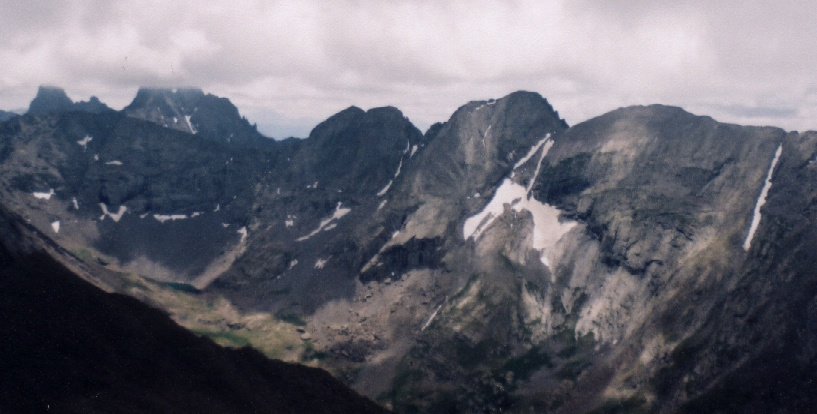
The Crestones as seen from Mount Adams. From left to right: Crestone Needle, Crestone Peak, Columbia Point, Kit Carson Peak, Challenger Point.

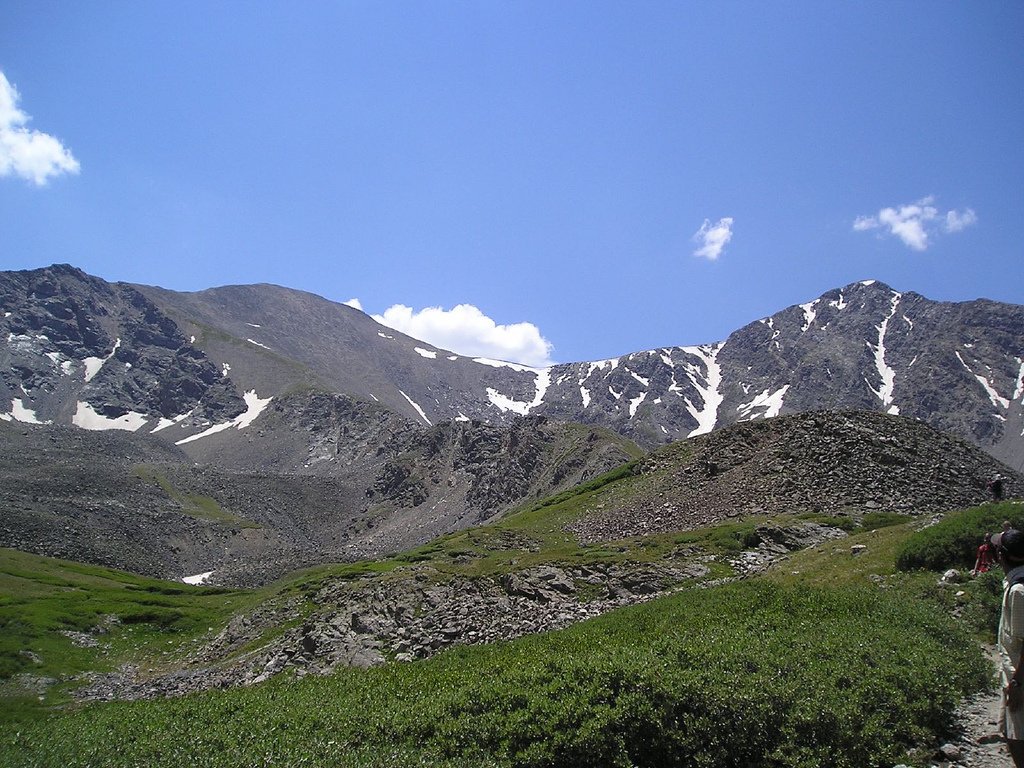
View of Grays Peak on left and Torreys Peak on right.

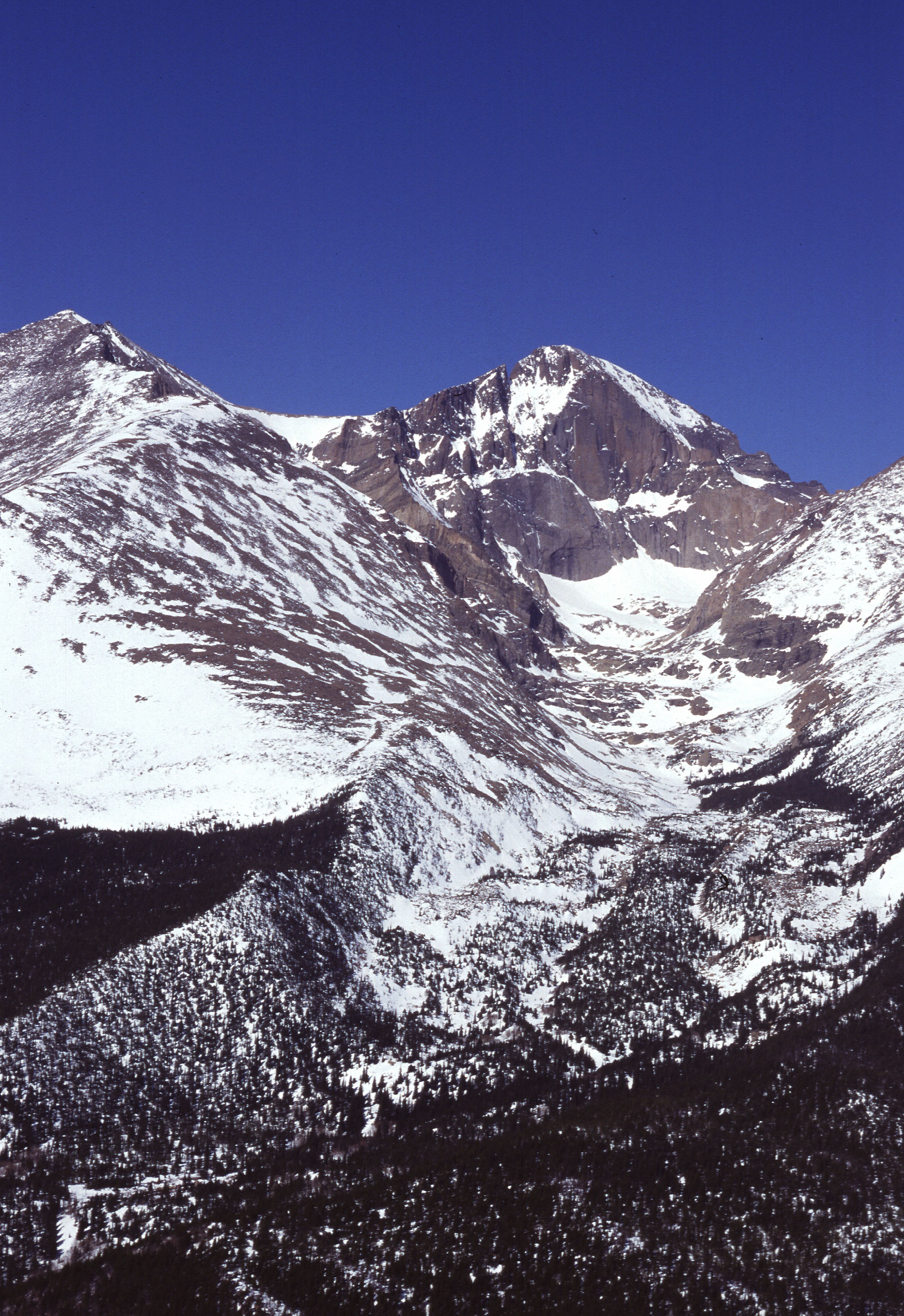
View of Longs Peak in Rocky Mountain National Park.

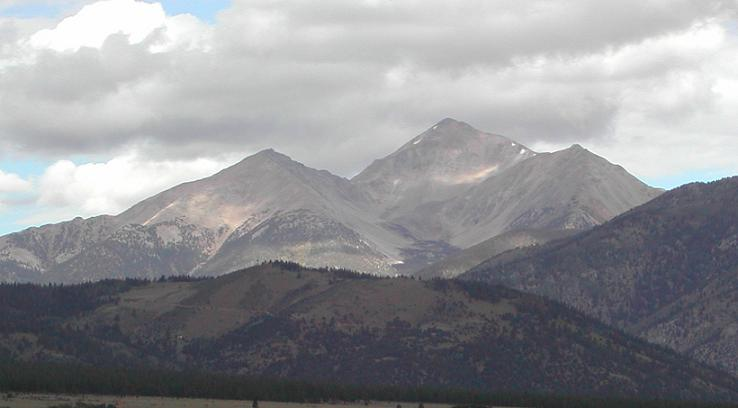
View of Mount Yale.

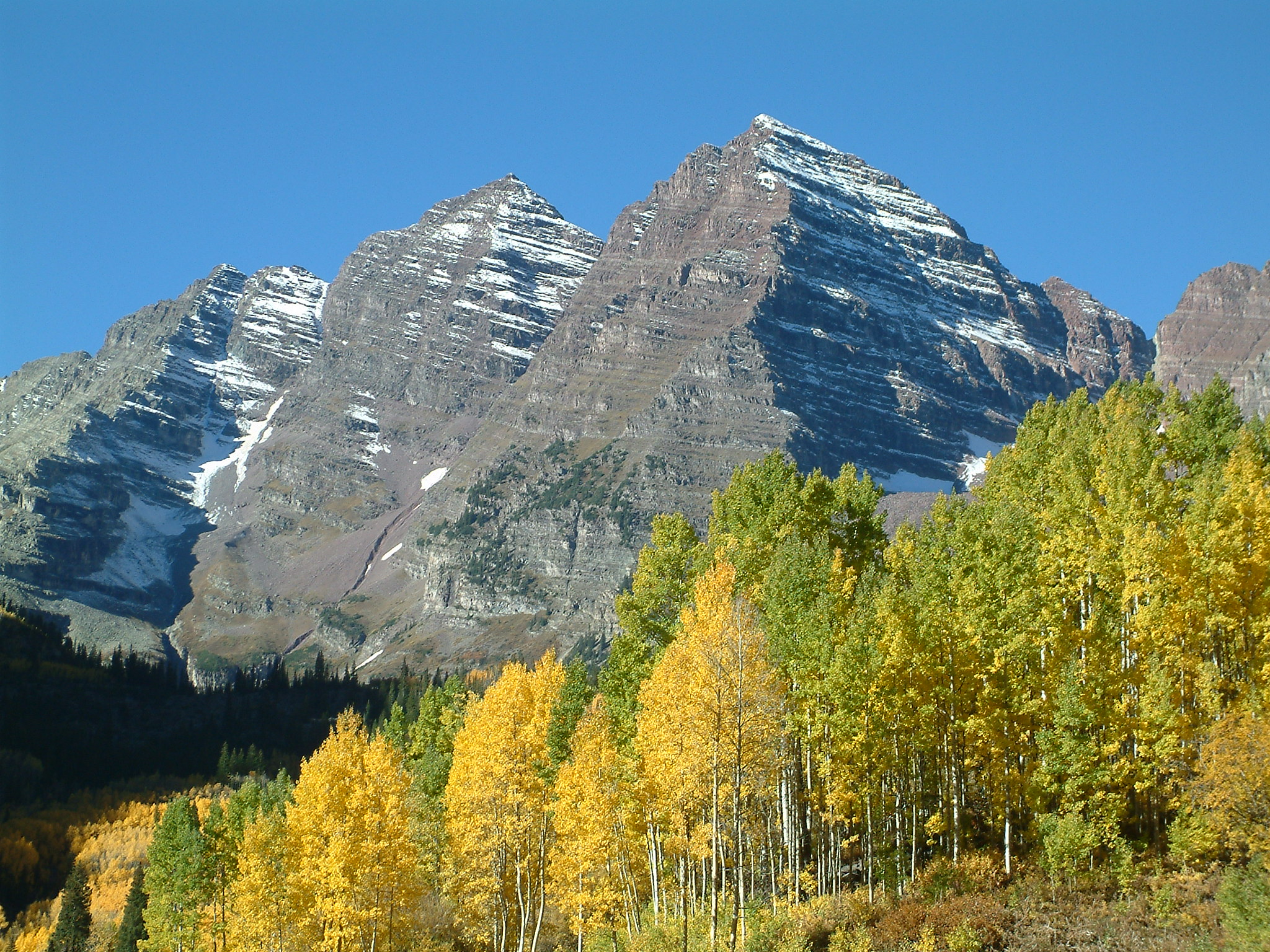
Autumn view of the Maroon Bells: Maroon Peak and North Maroon Peak.

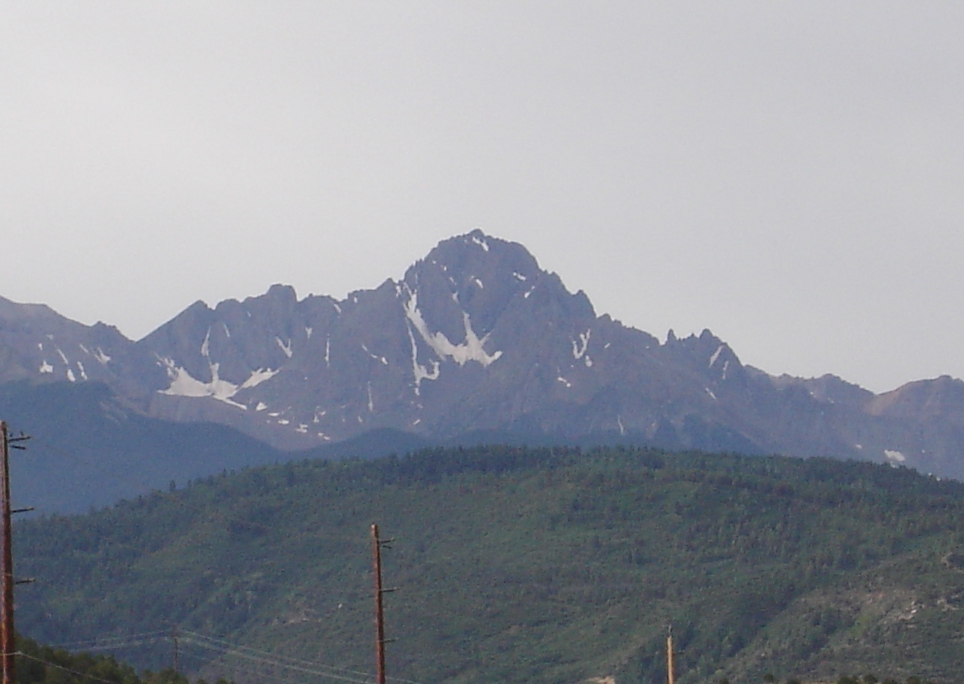
View of Mount Sneffels.

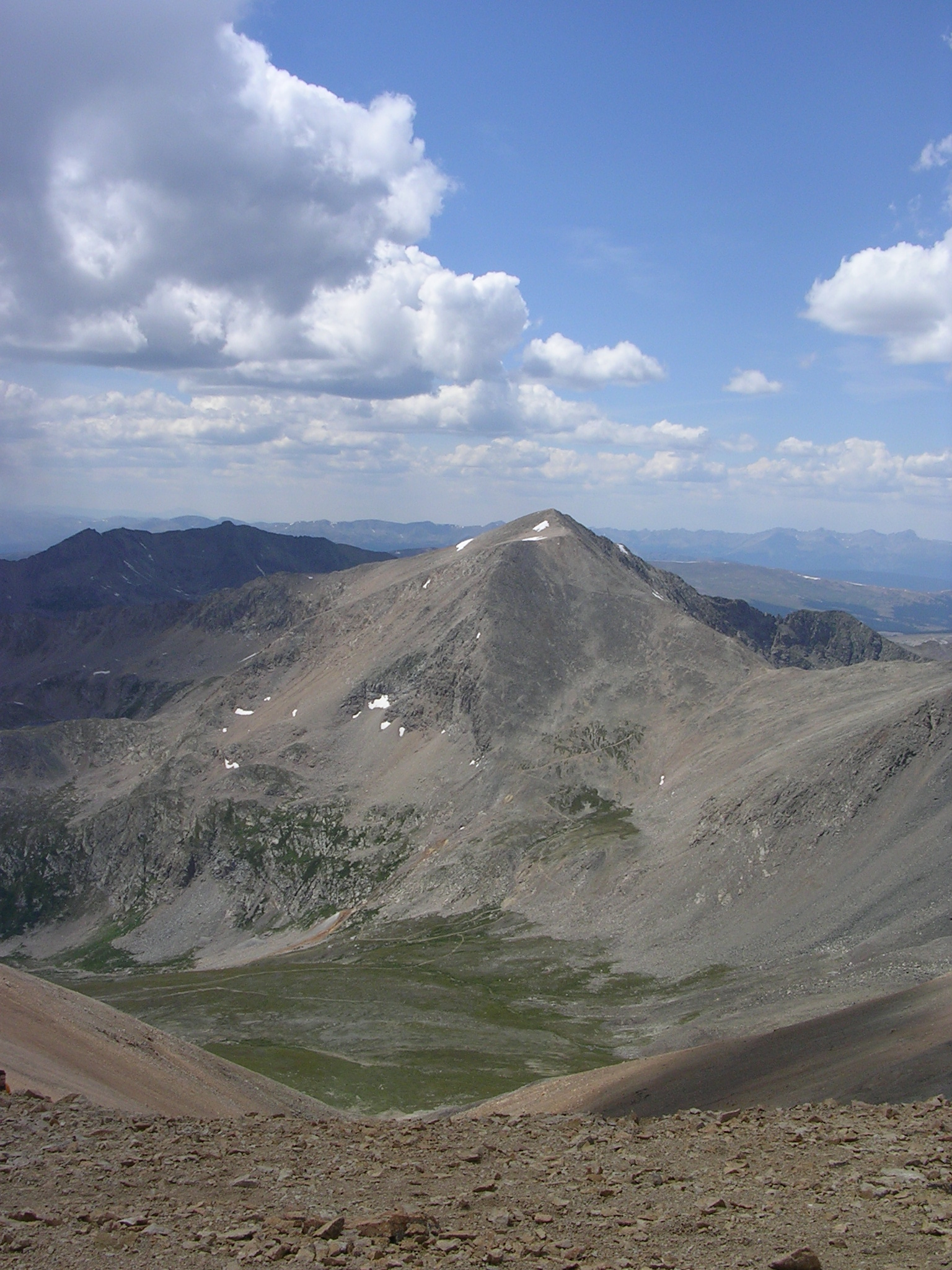
View of Mount Democrat.

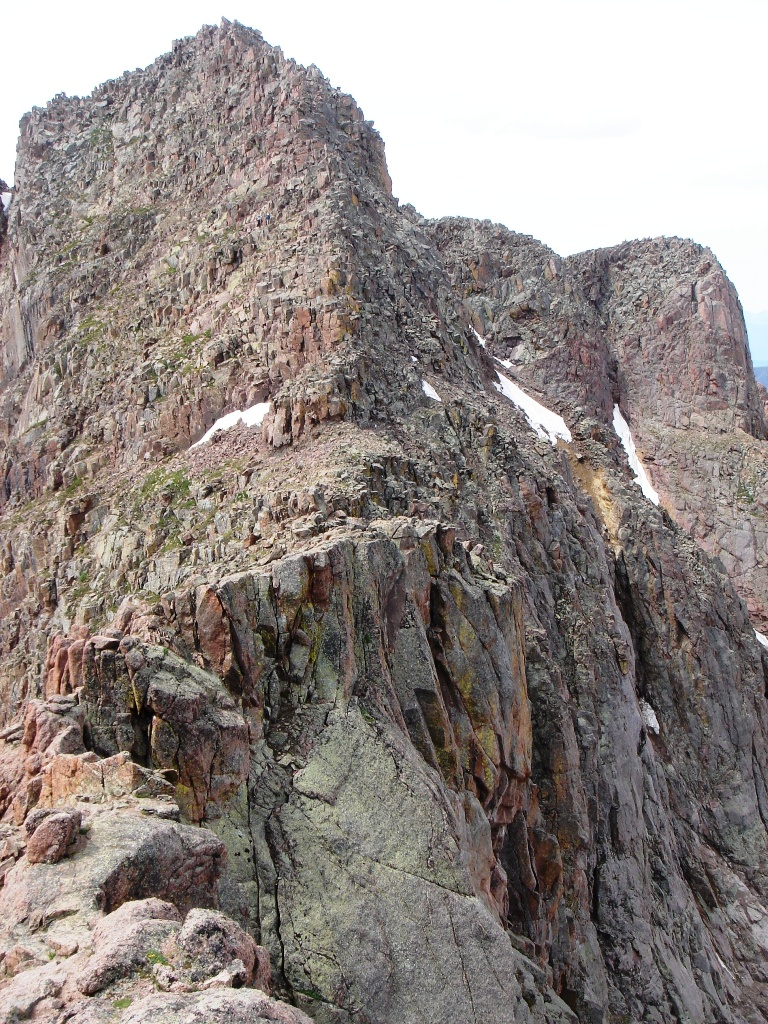
View of Mount Eolus.

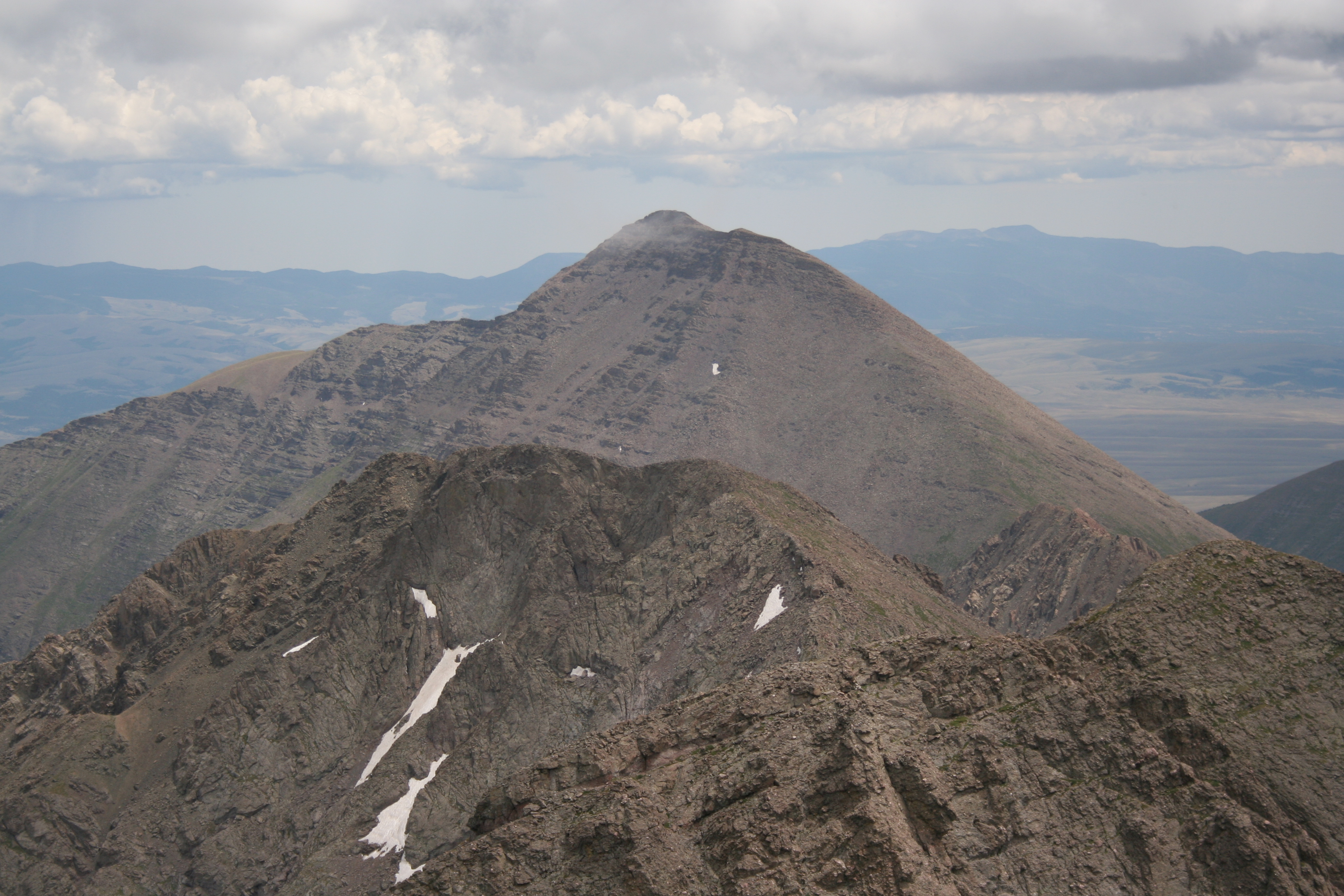
Humboldt Peak as seen from Kit Carson Peak.

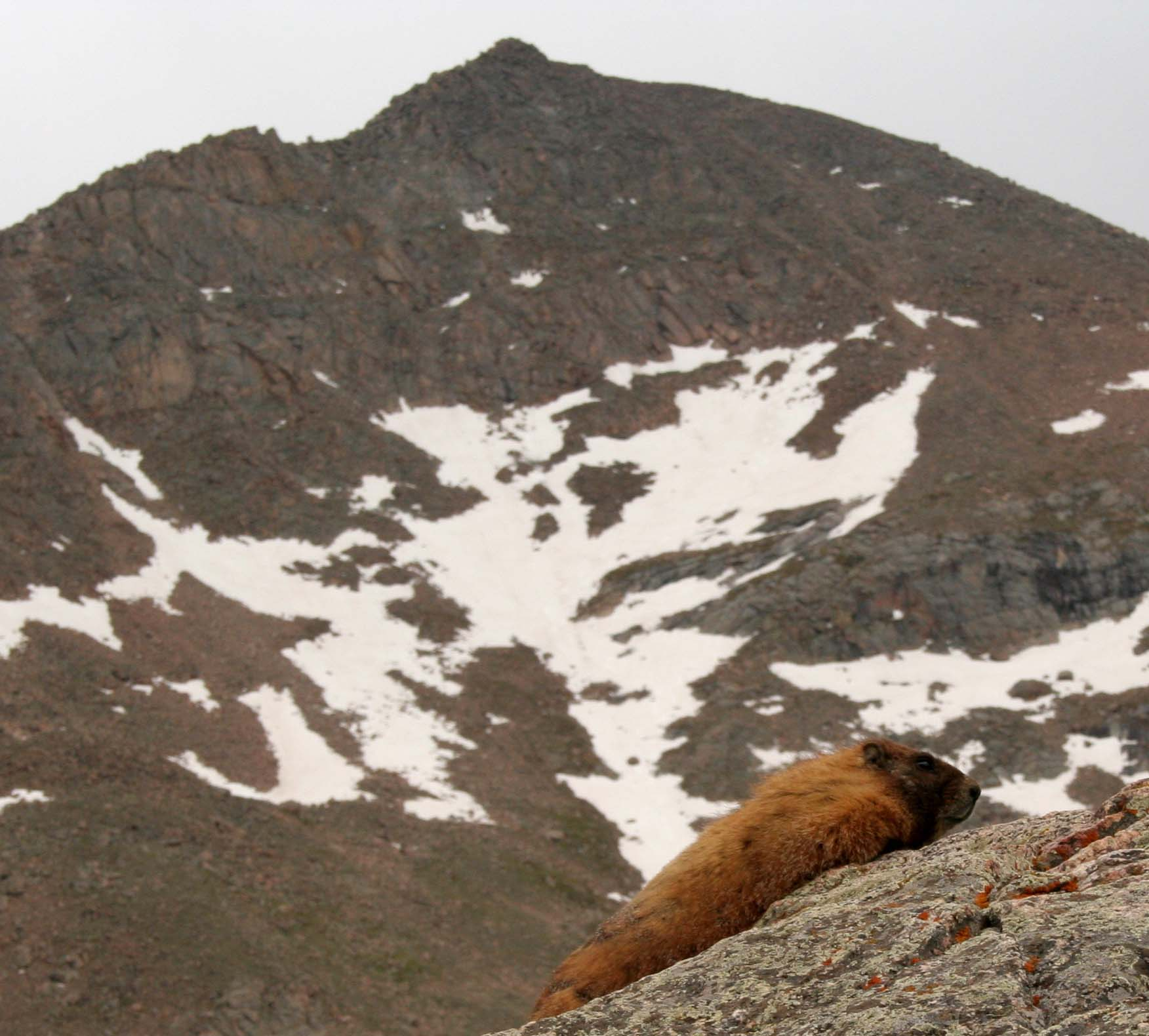
View of Mount Bierstadt with a marmot in the foreground.

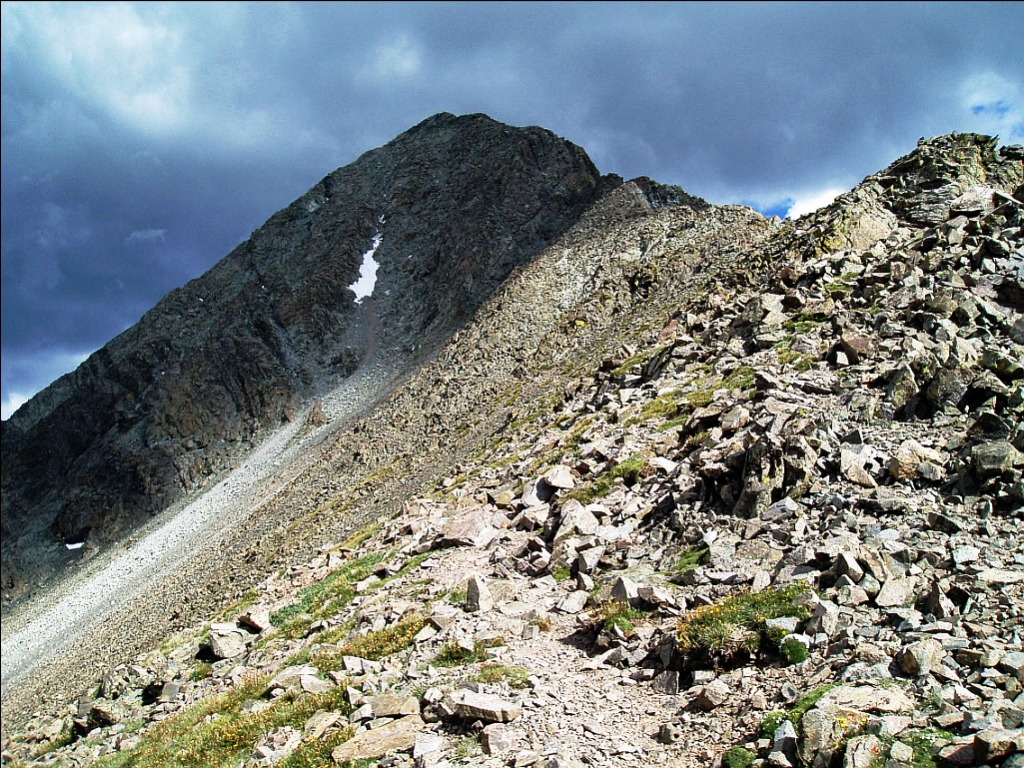
View of Mount Lindsey.

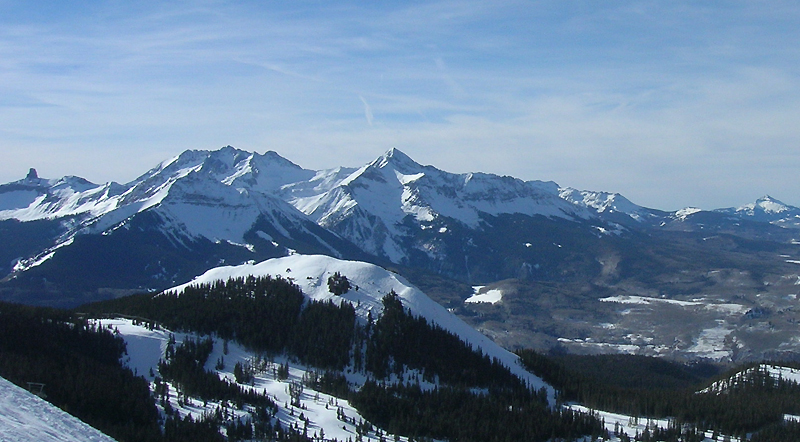
View of Wilson Peak and the San Miguel Mountains as seen from Telluride Ski Resort.

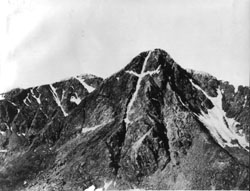
Photograph of the Mount of the Holy Cross taken by William Henry Jackson in 1873.

== See also ==
- List of mountain peaks of North America
  - List of mountain peaks of Greenland
  - List of mountain peaks of Canada
  - List of mountain peaks of the Rocky Mountains
  - List of mountain peaks of the United States
    - List of mountain peaks of Alaska
    - List of mountain peaks of California
    - List of mountain peaks of Colorado
      - List of the highest major summits of Colorado
        - List of the major 4000-meter summits of Colorado
        - List of the major 3000-meter summits of Colorado
        - List of Colorado fourteeners
      - List of the most prominent summits of Colorado
      - List of mountain ranges of Colorado
    - List of mountain peaks of Hawaiʻi
    - List of mountain peaks of Montana
    - List of mountain peaks of Nevada
    - List of mountain peaks of Utah
    - List of mountain peaks of Washington (state)
    - List of mountain peaks of Wyoming
  - List of mountain peaks of México
  - List of mountain peaks of Central America
  - List of mountain peaks of the Caribbean
- Colorado
  - Geography of Colorado
    - Category:Mountains of Colorado
      - commons:Category:Mountains of Colorado
- Physical geography
  - Topography
    - Topographic elevation
    - Topographic prominence
    - Topographic isolation
