= Redcloud Peak =

Mountain in Colorado, United States

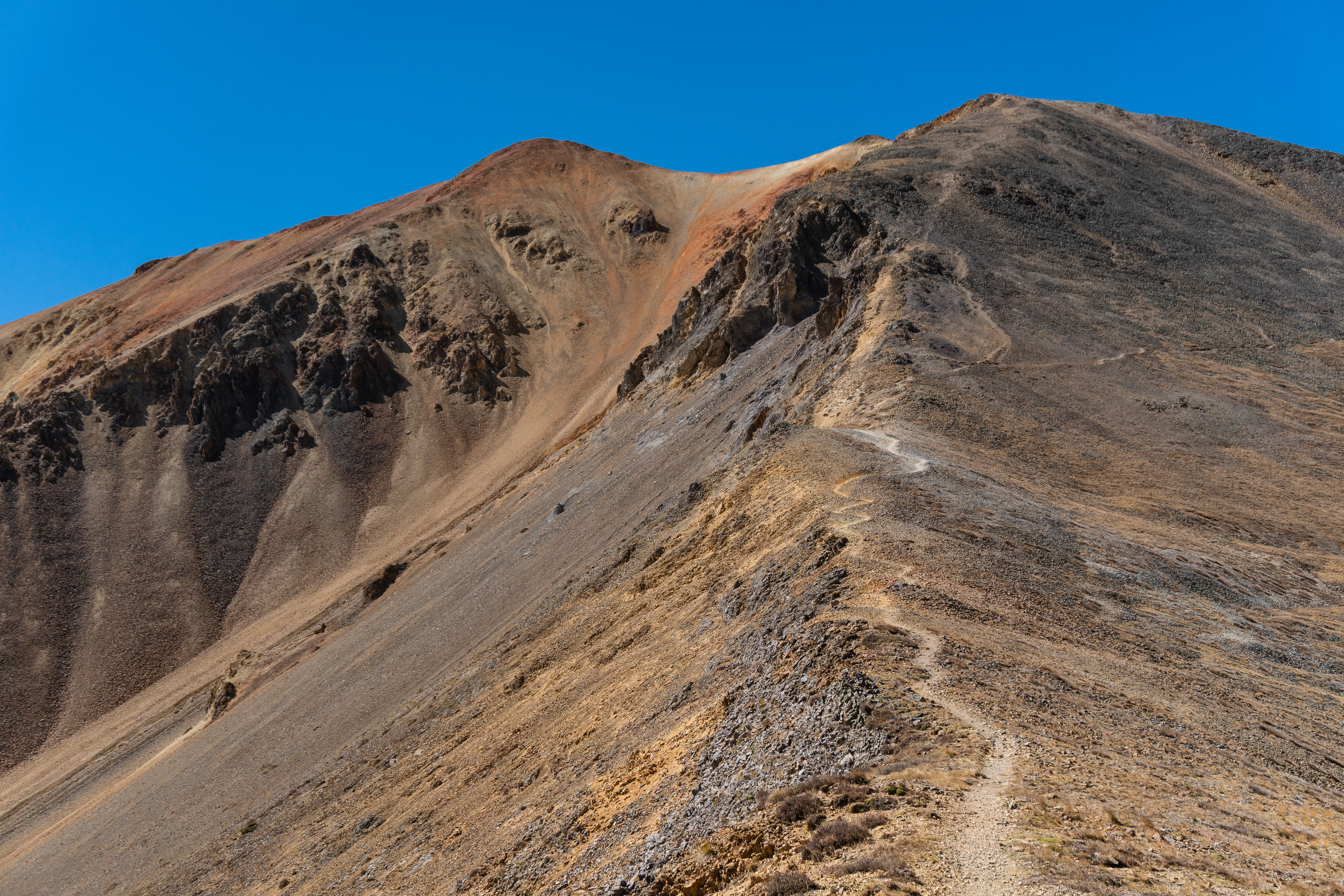
- The hiking trail to the peak's summit.

Highest point
- Elevation: 14,036.0 ft (4,278.2 m); NAPGD2022
- Prominence: 1,436 ft (438 m)
- Isolation: 4.91 mi (7.90 km)
- Listing: Colorado Fourteener 46th
- Coordinates: 37°56′27″N 107°25′19″W

Geography
- Location within Colorado
- Location: Hinsdale County, Colorado, U.S.
- Parent range: San Juan Mountains
- Topo map(s): USGS 7.5' topographic map Redcloud Peak, Colorado

Climbing
- First ascent: 1874 J. C. Spiller
- Easiest route: Northeast Ridge: Hike, class 2

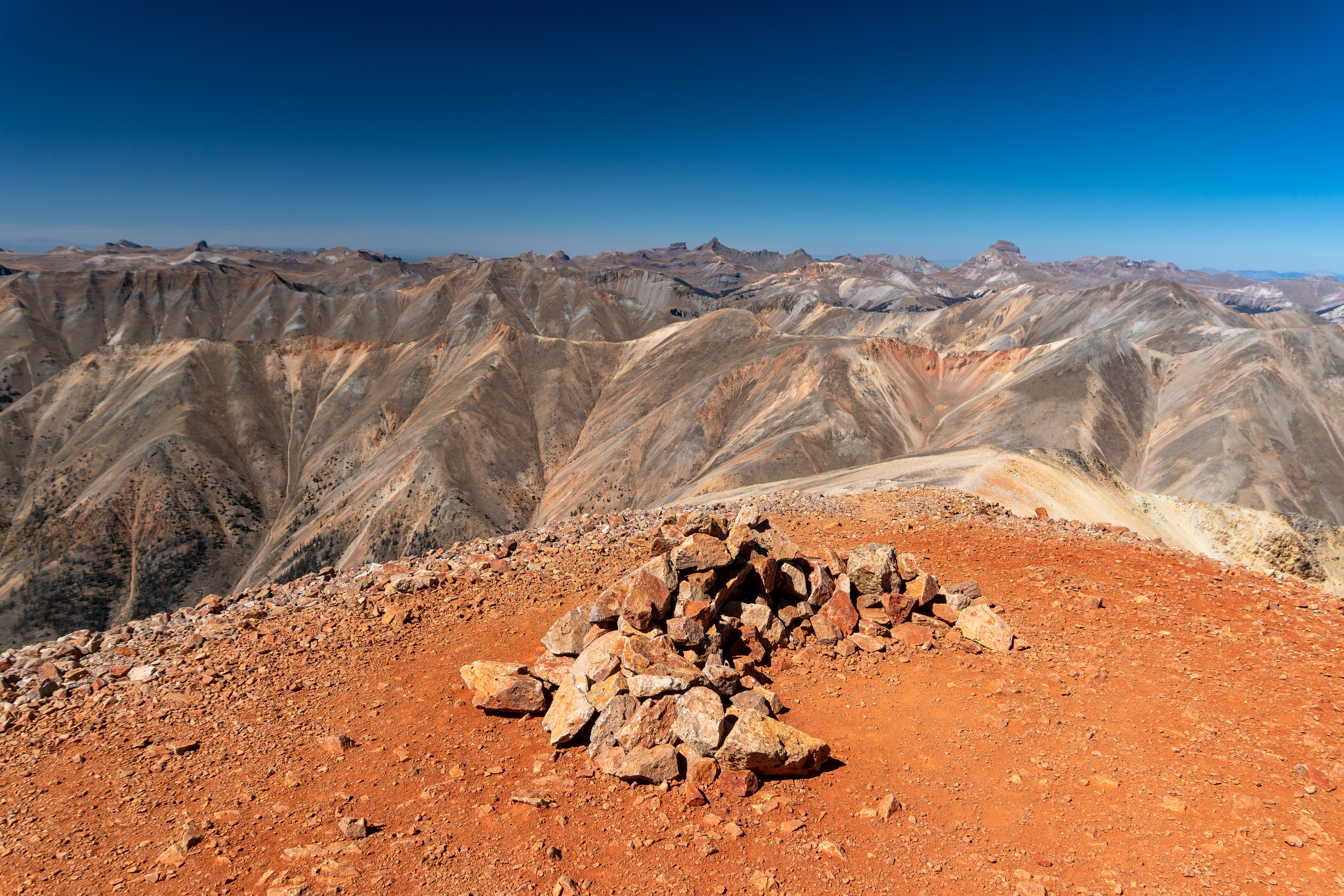
Summit of Redcloud Peak in the San Juan Mountains of Colorado.

Redcloud Peak is a mountain peak of over fourteen thousand feet in the U.S. state of Colorado. It is located in the San Juan Mountains in Hinsdale County approximately 7 miles (11 km) south west of Lake City.

== Historical names ==
- Red Mountain
- Redcloud Peak – 1906

== See also ==
- List of mountain peaks of Colorado
- List of Colorado fourteeners
