= Mount Shavano =

Mountain in Colorado, United States

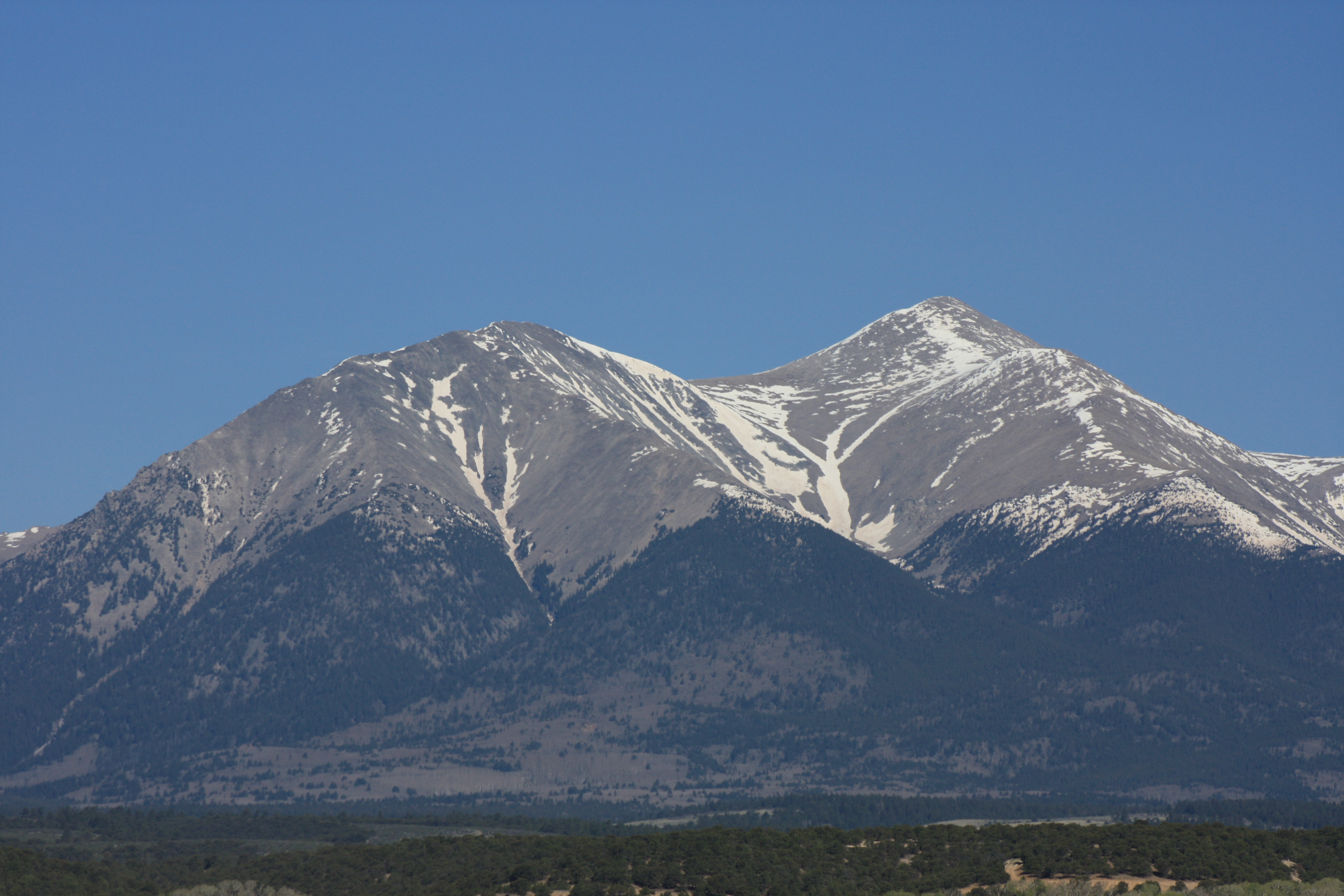
- Esprit Point (left) and Mt. Shavano from the southeast

Highest point
- Elevation: 14,228.3 ft (4,336.8 m); NAPGD2022
- Prominence: 1,619 ft (493 m)
- Isolation: 3.78 mi (6.08 km)
- Listing: Colorado Fourteener 17th
- Coordinates: 38°37′09″N 106°14′22″W

Geography
- Location within Colorado
- Location: Chaffee County, Colorado, U.S.
- Parent range: Sawatch Range
- Topo map(s): USGS 7.5' topographic map Maysville, Colorado

Climbing
- Easiest route: East Slopes: Hike, class 2

Mount Shavano is a high mountain summit in the southern Sawatch Range of the Rocky Mountains of North America. The 14,228.3-foot (4,337 m) fourteener is located in San Isabel National Forest, 6.5 miles (10.5 km) north by west (bearing 350°) of the community of Maysville in Chaffee County, Colorado, United States. The mountain was named in honor of Ute Chief Shavano.

== Mountain ==
Mount Shavano lies just east of the Continental Divide and just west of the Arkansas River rising 7,200 feet above the town of Salida in Chaffee County to the southeast. Mount Shavano lies in the south-central part of the Sawatch Range, north of Mount Ouray and Mount Chipeta and south of the Collegiate Peaks (including Mount Princeton, Mount Harvard, and Mount Yale). Mount Shavano is famous for the Angel of Shavano, a snow formation in the image of an angel that emerges on the east face of the mountain during snow melt each spring.

=== Climbing ===
The standard route to the top is rated Class 2.

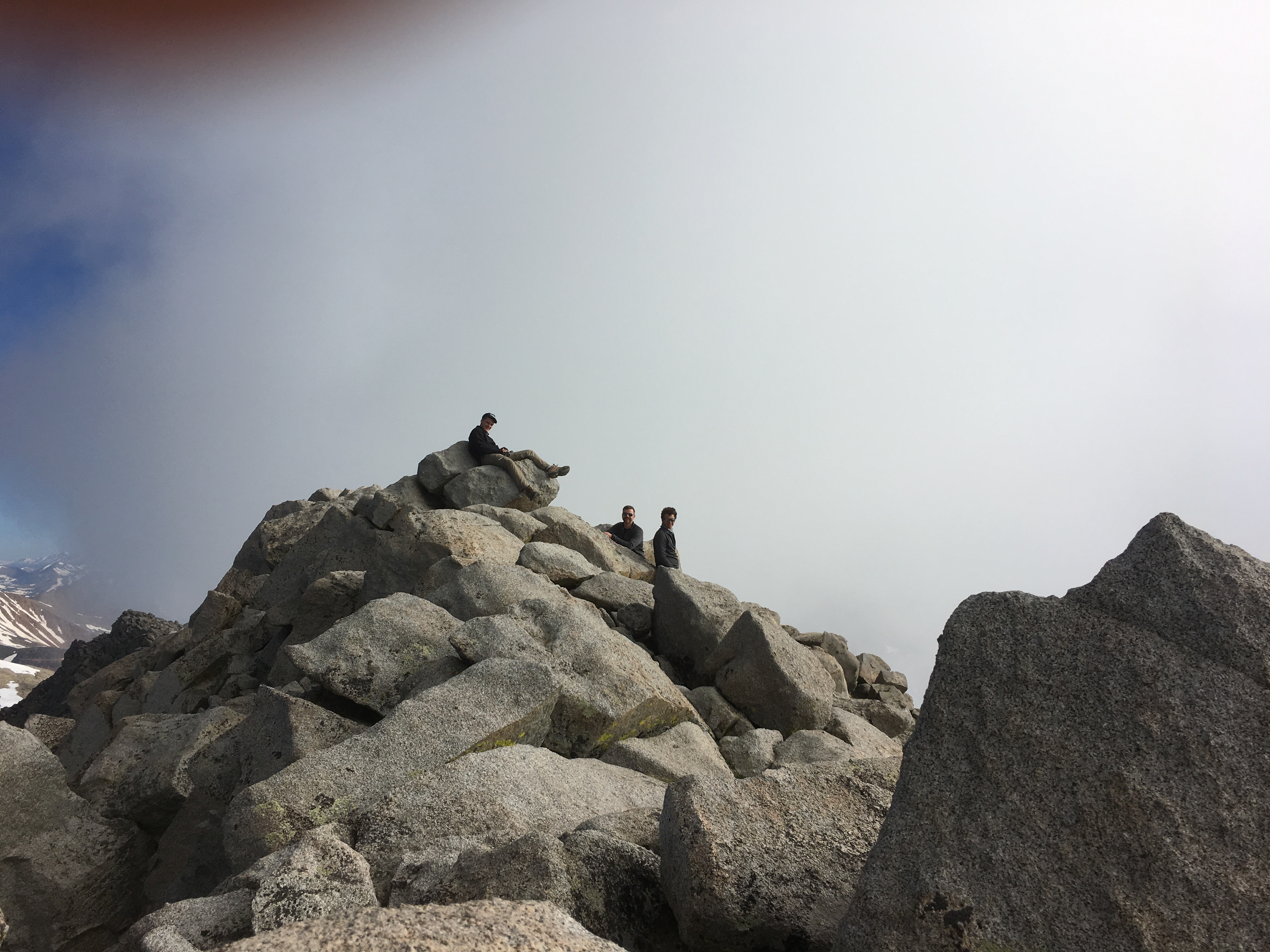
Mount Shavano's summit, June 2017.

== Historical names ==
- Mount Chavanaux
- Mount Shavano – 1981
- Mount Usher
- Shavano Peak – 1906

== See also ==
- List of mountain peaks of Colorado
  - List of Colorado fourteeners
