= Mount Lindsey =

Mountain in Colorado, United States

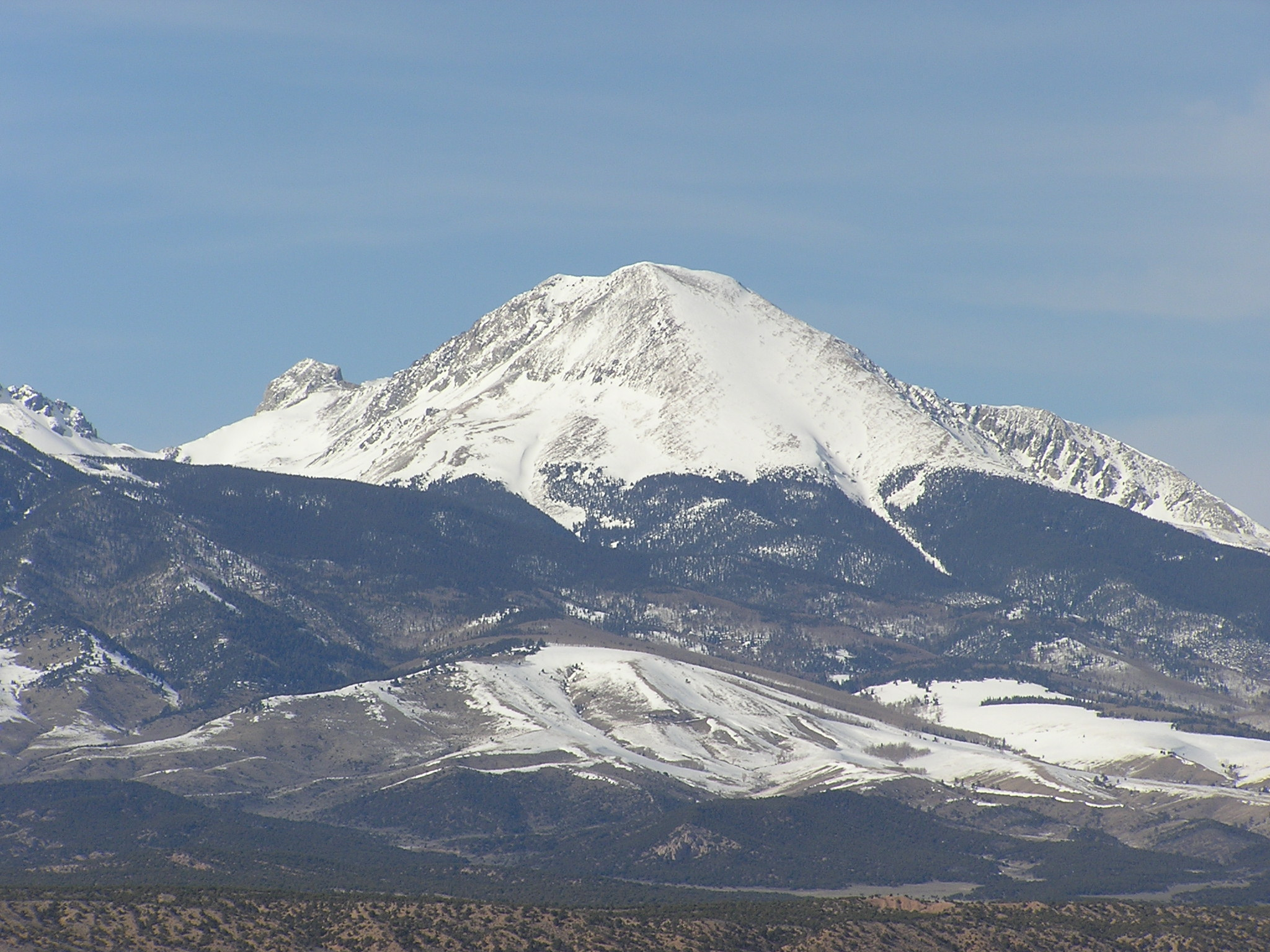
- Mt. Lindsey as seen from U.S. Route 160.

Highest point
- Elevation: 14,053.2 ft (4,283.4 m); NAPGD2022
- Prominence: 1,542 ft (470 m)
- Isolation: 2.26 mi (3.64 km)
- Listing: Colorado Fourteener 43rd
- Coordinates: 37°35′05″N 105°26′27″W

Geography
- Location within Colorado
- Location: Costilla County, Colorado, U.S.
- Parent range: Sangre de Cristo Range, Sierra Blanca Massif
- Topo map(s): USGS 7.5' topographic map Blanca Peak, Colorado

Climbing
- Easiest route: Northwest Gully: Scramble, class 3

Mount Lindsey is a high mountain summit on the Sierra Blanca Massif in the Sangre de Cristo Range of the Rocky Mountains of North America. The 14,053.2-foot (4,283 m) fourteener is located in the Sangre de Cristo Land Grant, 10.8 miles (17.4 km) north (bearing 358°) of the community of Fort Garland in Costilla County, Colorado, United States.

== Mountain ==
In 1954, the name was changed to honor Malcolm Lindsey, a beloved chaperone for the Juniors of the Colorado Mountain Club in the 1940s. Previously the mountain had been known as Old Baldy.

== Historical names ==
- Baldy
- Mount Lindsey – 1954
- Old Baldy
- Old Baldy Peak – 1906

== See also ==
- List of mountain peaks of Colorado
  - List of Colorado fourteeners
