= Handies Peak =

Mountain in the San Juan Mountains range, US

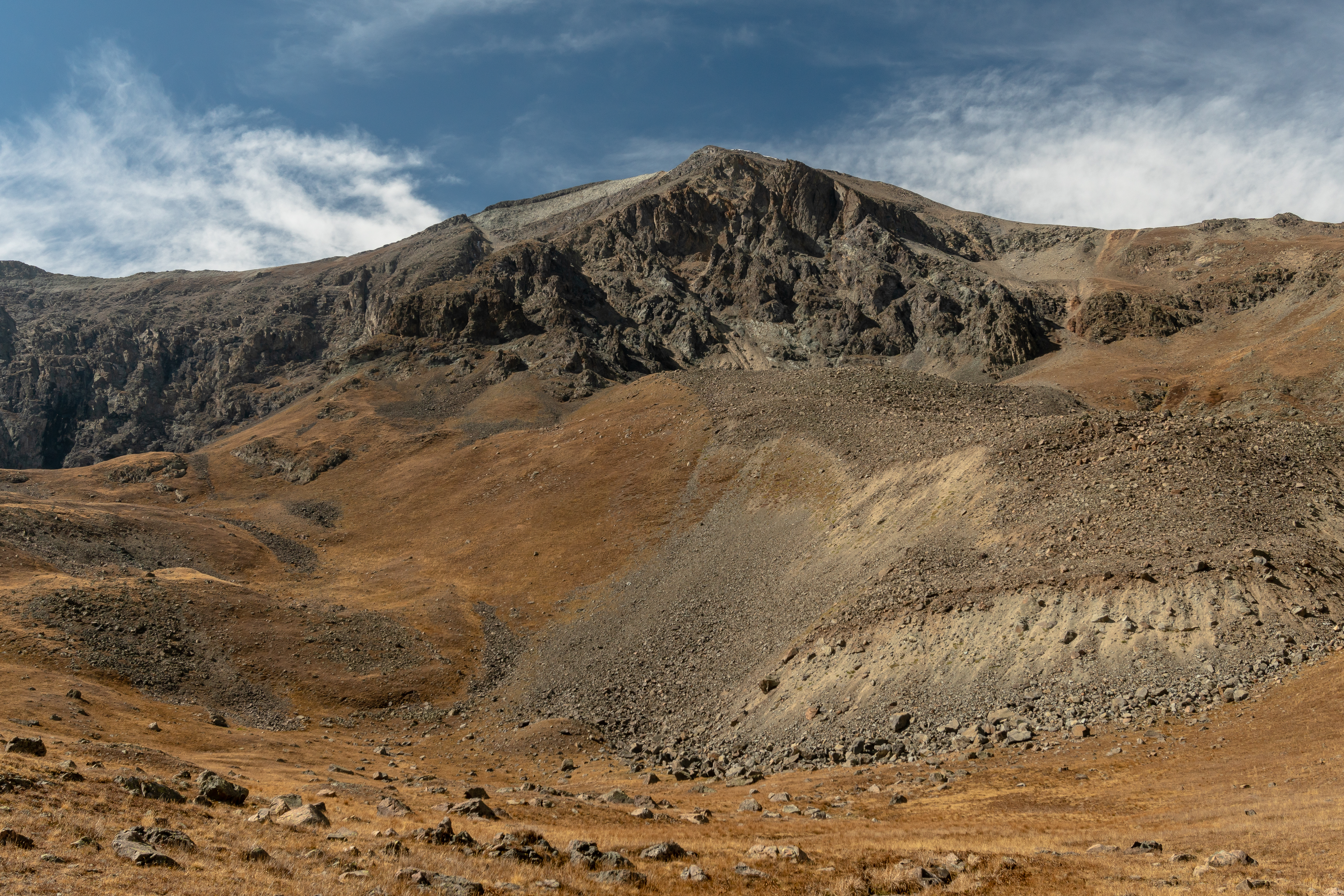
- The peak in 2018.

Highest point
- Elevation: 14,055.9 ft (4,284.2 m); NAPGD2022
- Prominence: 1908 ft (582 m)
- Isolation: 11.18 mi (18.00 km)
- Listing: North America highest peaks 56th; US highest major peaks 42nd; Colorado highest major peak 22nd; Colorado fourteeners 40th
- Coordinates: 37°54′47″N 107°30′16″W

Geography
- Location within Colorado
- Location: Hinsdale County, Colorado, U.S.
- Parent range: San Juan Mountains
- Topo map(s): USGS 7.5' topographic map Handies Peak, Colorado

Climbing
- First ascent: 1874 Franklin Rhoda
- Easiest route: Southwest Slopes: Hike, class 1

Handies Peak is a high and prominent mountain summit of the San Juan Mountains range in the Rocky Mountains of North America. The 14,056-foot (4284.24 m) fourteener is located in the Bureau of Land Management Handies Peak Wilderness Study Area, 13.4 miles (21.5 km) southwest by west (bearing 232°) of the Town of Lake City in Hinsdale County, Colorado, United States.

== Climbing ==
There is a class 1 route to the top.

== See also ==
- List of mountain peaks of North America
- List of mountain peaks of the United States
- List of mountain peaks of Colorado
- List of Colorado fourteeners
