= Ellingwood =

Ellingwood may refer to:

== People with the family name ==
- Albert R. Ellingwood (1887–1934), American mountaineer.
- Bruce R. Ellingwood, American academic.
- Finley Ellingwood, American physician.

== People with the middle name ==
- Francis Ellingwood Abbot (1836–1903), American philosopher and theologian.

== Locations ==
- Ellingwood Ledges (Crestone Needle), a climbing route in Colorado, U.S.
- Ellingwood Point, a mountain summit in Colorado, U.S.
