= Humboldt Peak (Colorado) =

Mountain in Colorado, United States

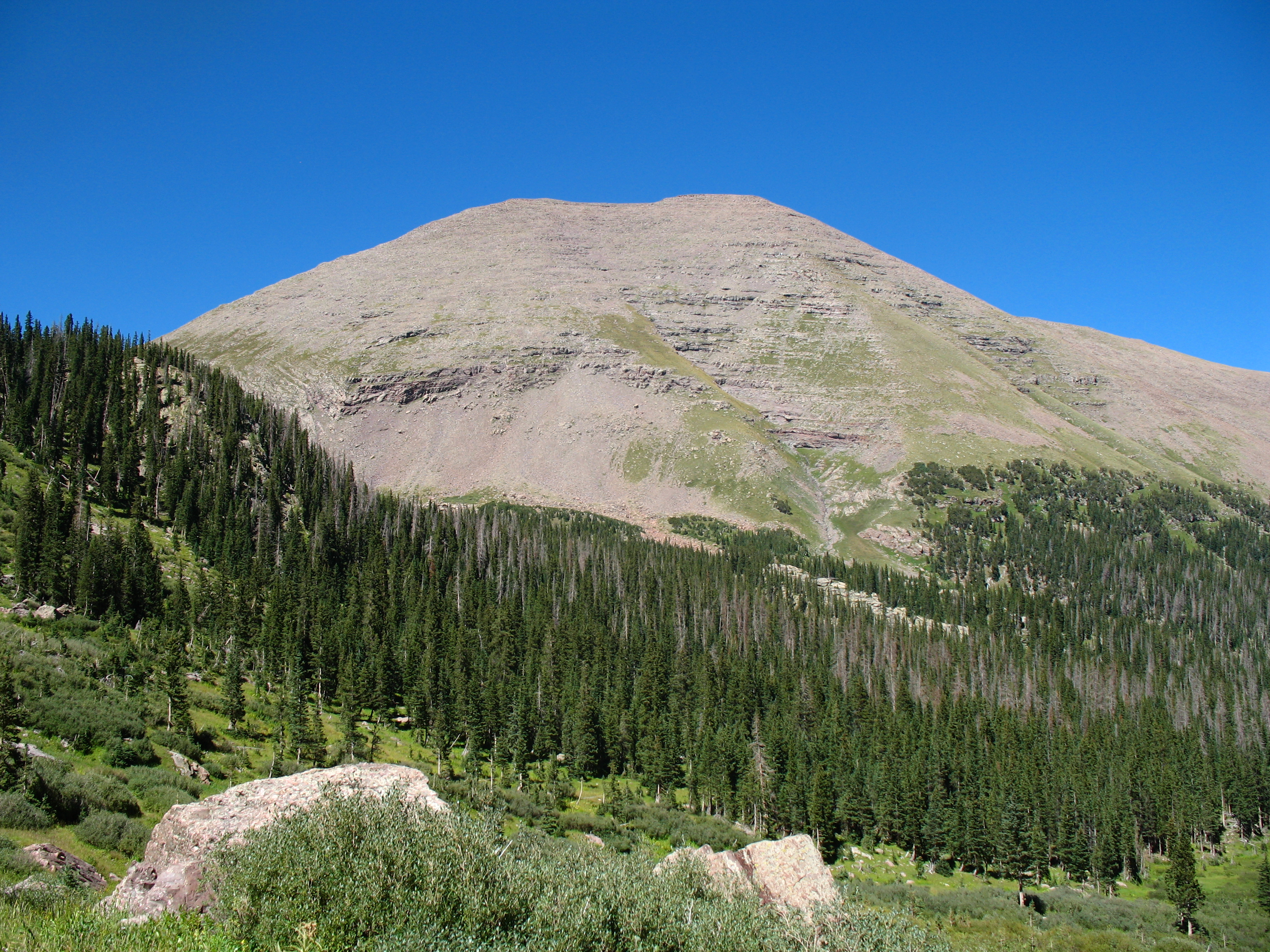
- Humboldt Peak, south aspect

Highest point
- Elevation: 14,066.6 ft (4,287.5 m); NAPGD2022
- Prominence: 1,204 ft (367 m)
- Isolation: 1.41 mi (2.27 km)
- Listing: Colorado Fourteener 37th
- Coordinates: 37°58′34″N 105°33′19″W

Geography
- Location within Colorado
- Location: Custer County, Colorado, U.S.
- Parent range: Sangre de Cristo Range, Crestones
- Topo map(s): USGS 7.5' topographic map Crestone Peak, Colorado

Climbing
- Easiest route: West Ridge: Hike, class 2

Humboldt Peak is a high mountain summit of the Crestones in the Sangre de Cristo Range of the Rocky Mountains of North America. The 14,066.6-foot (4,287 m) fourteener is located in the Sangre de Cristo Wilderness of San Isabel National Forest, 11.9 miles (19.2 km) south-southwest (bearing 204°) of the Town of Westcliffe in Custer County, Colorado, United States.

The Crestones are a cluster of high summits in the Sangre de Cristo Range, comprising Crestone Peak, Crestone Needle, Kit Carson Peak, Challenger Point, Humboldt Peak, and Columbia Point.

The mountain was named in honor of German naturalist and explorer Alexander von Humboldt.

== Climbing ==
The standard route on the peak is a hike along a trail, with rock scrambling (Class 2) near the summit. The trail climbs the peak from the South Colony Lakes basin, accessed from the east side of the range. This basin is a popular site that is also the base for most climbs of Crestone Peak and Crestone Needle.

== Climate ==
According to the Köppen climate classification system, Humboldt is located in an alpine subarctic climate zone with cold, snowy winters, and cool to warm summers. Due to its altitude, it receives precipitation all year, as snow in winter, and as thunderstorms in summer, with a dry period in late spring.

== Gallery ==
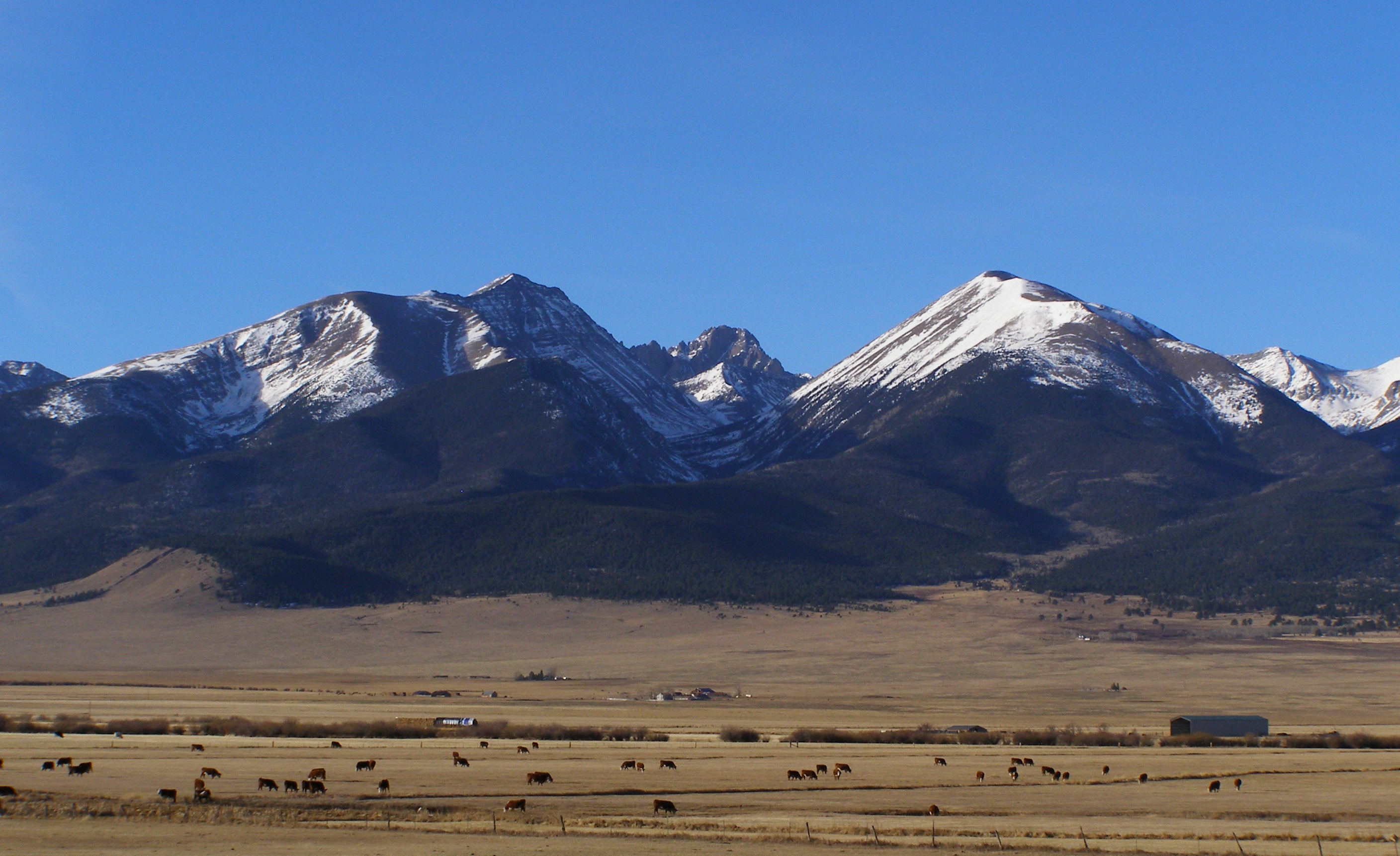
Humboldt Peak (left) and Colony Baldy (right)

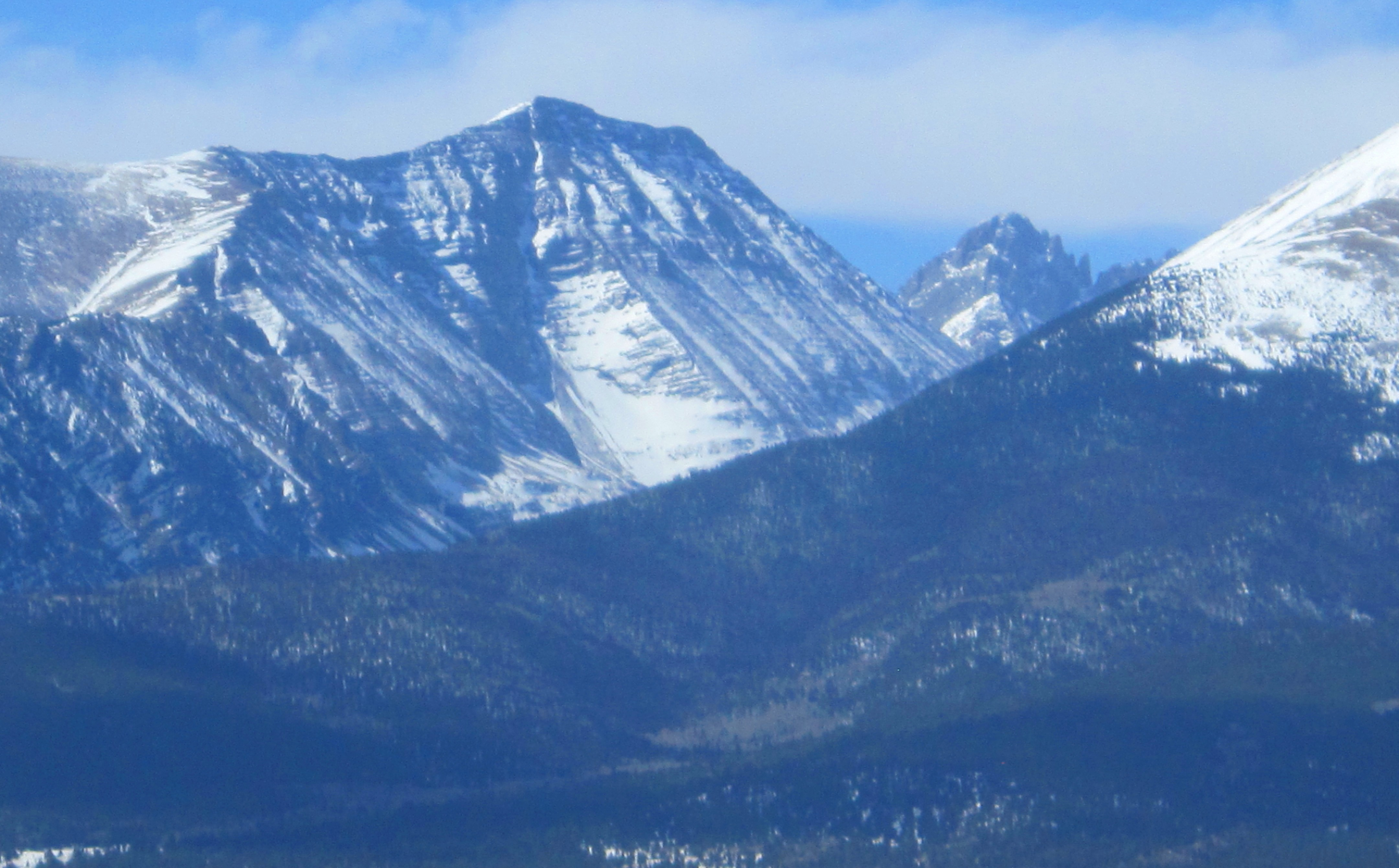
In Winter from the northeast

== See also ==
- List of Colorado fourteeners
- List of mountain peaks of Colorado
