= Crestone Peak =

Mountain in the state of Colorado, United States

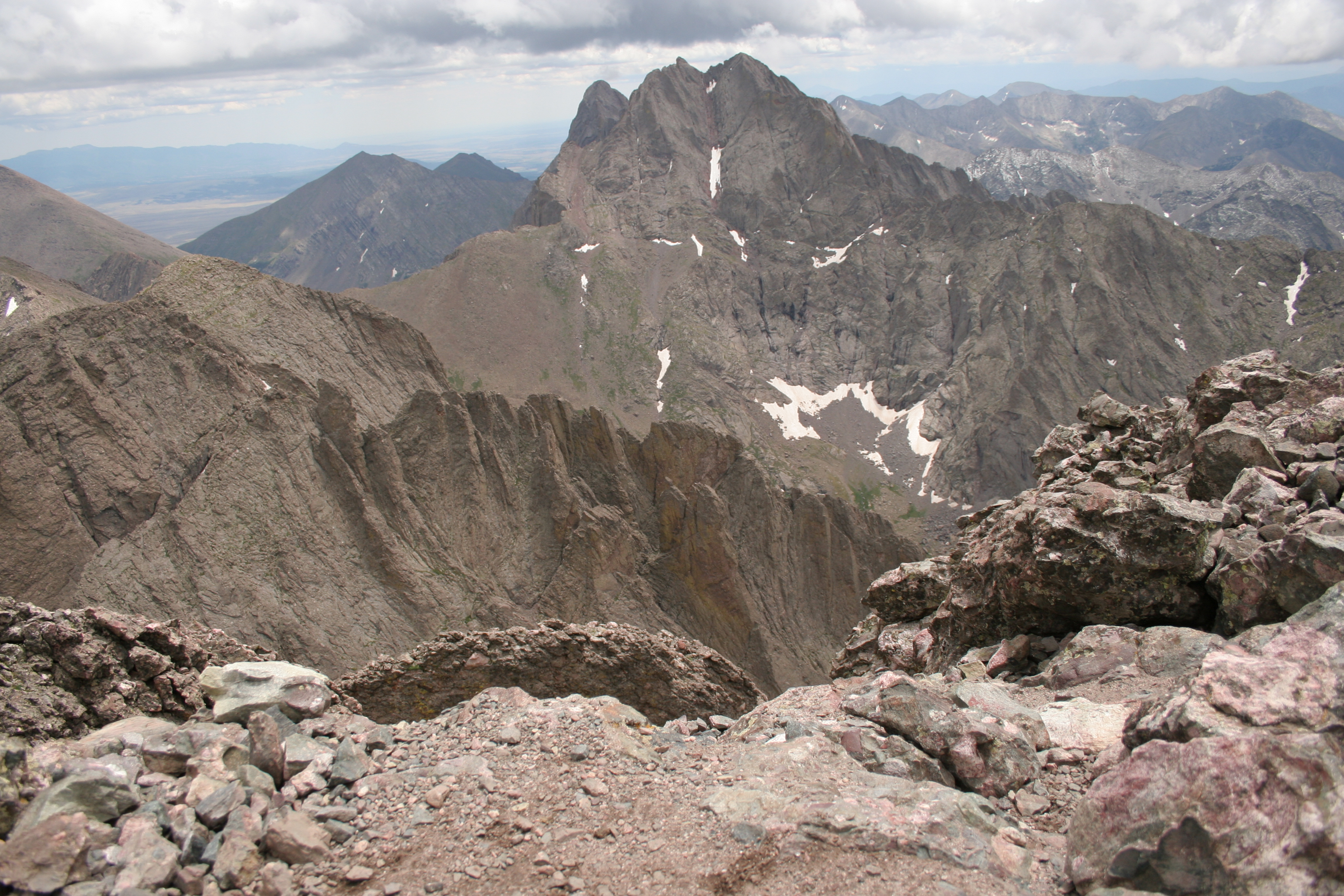
- Crestone Peak seen from Kit Carson

Highest point
- Elevation: 14,296.8 feet (4,358 m); NAPGD2022
- Prominence: 4,554 ft (1,388 m)
- Isolation: 27.4 mi (44.1 km)
- Listing: North America highest peaks 36th; U.S. highest major peaks 22nd; Colorado highest major peaks 7th; Colorado fourteeners 7th; Colorado county high points 7th
- Coordinates: 37°58′00″N 105°35′07″W

Geography
- Location within Colorado
- Location: High point of Saguache County, Colorado, United States.
- Parent range: Sangre de Cristo Range, Highest summit of the Crestones
- Topo map(s): USGS 7.5' topographic map Crestone Peak, Colorado

Climbing
- First ascent: 1916 by Eleanor Davis and party
- Easiest route: South Face: Scramble, class 3

Crestone East Peak

Highest point
- Elevation: 14,266 ft (4,348 m) (Note: The elevation of Crestone East Peak includes an adjustment of +1.762 meters (5.78 ft) from NGVD 29 to NAVD 88.)
- Prominence: 80 ft (24 m)
- Parent peak: Crestone Peak
- Isolation: 0.08 mi (0.13 km)
- Listing: Colorado county high points
- Coordinates: 37°58′02″N 105°35′03″W

Geography
- Location: Saguache County and high point of Custer County, Colorado, U.S.

Crestone Peak is the seventh-highest summit of the Rocky Mountains of North America and the U.S. state of Colorado. The prominent 14,296.8-foot (4,358 m) fourteener is the highest summit of the Crestones and the second-highest summit in the Sangre de Cristo Range after Blanca Peak. The summit is located in the Sangre de Cristo Wilderness of Rio Grande National Forest, 5.0 miles (8.1 km) east by south (bearing 102°) of the Town of Crestone in Saguache County, Colorado, United States. (Note: The elevation of Crestone Peak includes an adjustment of +1.760 m (5.77 ft) from NGVD 29 to NAVD 88.)

Crestone Peak rises 7,000 feet (2,100 m) above the east side of the San Luis Valley. It shares its name with the nearby Crestone Needle, another fourteener of the Crestones. The Crestones are a cluster of high summits in the Sangre de Cristo Range, comprising Crestone Peak, Crestone Needle, Kit Carson Peak, Challenger Point, Humboldt Peak, and Columbia Point. They are usually accessed from common trailheads.

A 2021 survey found that the actual summit may be about 400 feet (120 m) to the east of the recognized summit, one-third of a foot taller.

== Climbing ==
Generally climbs of Crestone Peak or Crestone Needle start from a base camp at South Colony Lakes, east of the peak, accessed from the Wet Mountain Valley on the northeast side of the range. This route involves nearly 6,000 ft (1,800 m) of elevation gain and ascends to a large relatively flat area called "The Pool Table" (a few large rocks lie on the tundra, as if billiard balls) or the "Bears' Playground." Then it ascends a long gully on the northwest side of Crestone Peak, which involves some rockfall danger (hence a climbing helmet is suggested). Crestone Peak is one of the more dangerous fourteener climbs in Colorado; accidents occur often in the Crestones, some caused by falls or lightning (a daily summer occurrence in the Sangre de Cristos).

Alternatively, the Cottonwood Creek route begins in the San Luis Valley and approaches the Crestones from the west. The route follows Cottonwood Creek to Cottonwood Lake. The trail starts out well defined, but after passing a south eastern tributary at approximately 11,1000 ft it becomes faint, poorly maintained, and hard to follow for much of the upper route prior to rejoining the standard route from South Colony Lakes. From there, the South Face route of Crestone Peak is accessible.

From Crestone Peak, it is a mildly technical (Class 5—rope recommended) ridge scramble to the summit of Crestone Needle, similarly in the other direction. However, Crestone Peak and Crestone Needle are more commonly climbed separately.

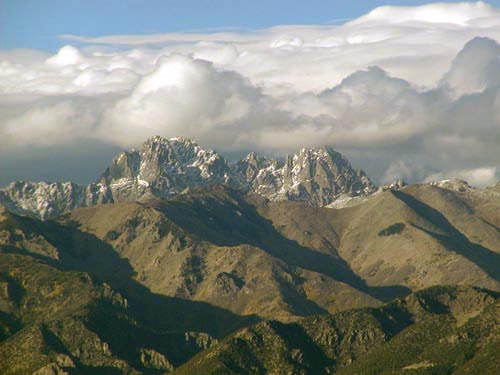
Crestone Peak and Crestone Needle, fall

== Climate ==
Crestone Peak has an alpine climate (Köppen ETH), as no month in that area has an average temperature greater than 50 °F (10 °C).

Climate data for Crestone Peak 37.9688 N, 105.5847 W, Elevation: 13,504 ft (4,116 m) (1991–2020 normals)
Month	Jan	Feb	Mar	Apr	May	Jun	Jul	Aug	Sep	Oct	Nov	Dec	Year
Mean daily maximum °F (°C)	24.0 (−4.4)	23.7 (−4.6)	28.5 (−1.9)	33.9 (1.1)	42.2 (5.7)	53.4 (11.9)	58.5 (14.7)	56.1 (13.4)	50.1 (10.1)	39.7 (4.3)	30.8 (−0.7)	24.5 (−4.2)	38.8 (3.8)
Daily mean °F (°C)	12.0 (−11.1)	11.4 (−11.4)	15.7 (−9.1)	20.7 (−6.3)	29.1 (−1.6)	39.3 (4.1)	44.3 (6.8)	42.8 (6.0)	37.1 (2.8)	27.6 (−2.4)	19.3 (−7.1)	12.8 (−10.7)	26.0 (−3.3)
Mean daily minimum °F (°C)	0.0 (−17.8)	−0.9 (−18.3)	2.9 (−16.2)	7.5 (−13.6)	16.1 (−8.8)	25.3 (−3.7)	30.2 (−1.0)	29.5 (−1.4)	24.0 (−4.4)	15.4 (−9.2)	7.8 (−13.4)	1.2 (−17.1)	13.3 (−10.4)
Average precipitation inches (mm)	3.19 (81)	3.98 (101)	4.23 (107)	4.91 (125)	3.49 (89)	1.48 (38)	4.16 (106)	4.38 (111)	3.40 (86)	3.66 (93)	3.36 (85)	3.49 (89)	43.73 (1,111)
Source: PRISM Climate Group

The SNOTEL weather station, South Colony, lies in the eastern valley below Crestone Peak and Humboldt Peak (Colorado). Due to its lower elevation, South Colony has a comparatively warmer climate, with slightly shorter winters and two months averaging above 50 °F or 10 °C. This means that it has a subalpine climate (Köppen Dfc), with long winters and cool, short summers.

Climate data for South Colony, Colorado (elevation 10,800 feet or 3,292 meters), 1992–2020 normals:
Month	Jan	Feb	Mar	Apr	May	Jun	Jul	Aug	Sep	Oct	Nov	Dec	Year
Mean daily maximum °F (°C)	28.2 (−2.1)	30.7 (−0.7)	39.0 (3.9)	45.1 (7.3)	53.5 (11.9)	63.3 (17.4)	67.3 (19.6)	64.8 (18.2)	58.2 (14.6)	46.7 (8.2)	35.7 (2.1)	27.0 (−2.8)	46.6 (8.1)
Daily mean °F (°C)	18.9 (−7.3)	21.0 (−6.1)	27.7 (−2.4)	33.3 (0.7)	41.3 (5.2)	49.6 (9.8)	53.9 (12.2)	52.2 (11.2)	46.4 (8.0)	37.0 (2.8)	27.0 (−2.8)	19.0 (−7.2)	35.6 (2.0)
Mean daily minimum °F (°C)	9.7 (−12.4)	11.3 (−11.5)	16.3 (−8.7)	21.4 (−5.9)	29.0 (−1.7)	36.0 (2.2)	40.6 (4.8)	39.7 (4.3)	34.7 (1.5)	27.2 (−2.7)	18.2 (−7.7)	10.9 (−11.7)	24.6 (−4.1)
Average precipitation inches (mm)	2.86 (73)	3.41 (87)	4.11 (104)	4.21 (107)	3.15 (80)	1.86 (47)	4.27 (108)	4.63 (118)	3.10 (79)	3.42 (87)	3.02 (77)	3.20 (81)	41.24 (1,048)
Source 1: XMACIS2
Source 2: NOAA (Precipitation)

== See also ==
- List of mountain peaks of North America
  - List of mountain peaks of the United States
    - List of mountain peaks of Colorado
      - List of Colorado county high points
      - List of Colorado fourteeners
