= Broken Hand Peak =

Mountain in the state of Colorado

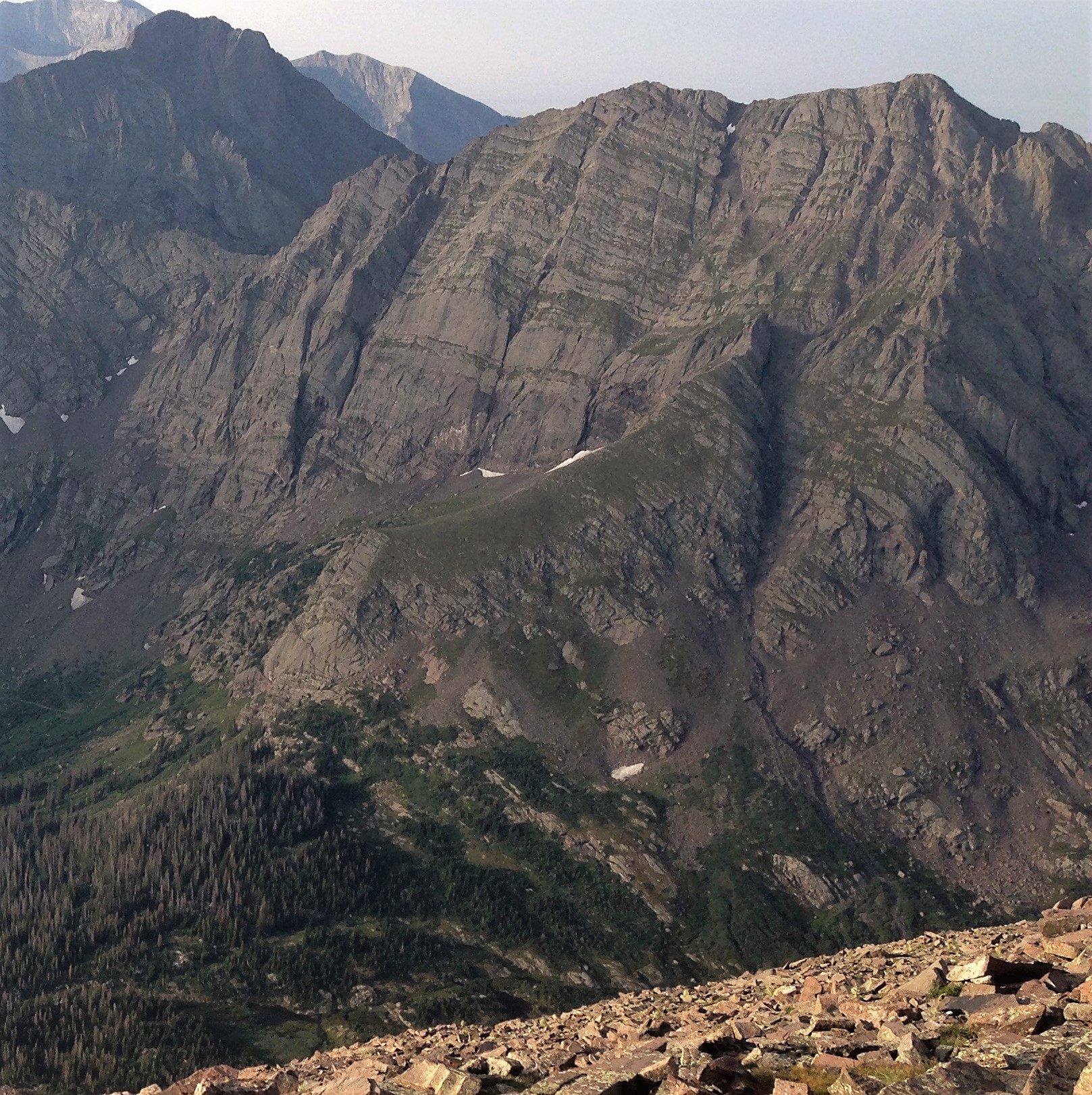
- North aspect of Broken Hand Peak (right) viewed from Humboldt Peak. (Pico Aislado in upper left corner of frame)

Highest point
- Elevation: 13,573 ft (4,137 m)
- Prominence: 649 ft (198 m)
- Parent peak: Crestone Needle (14,203 ft)
- Isolation: 0.77 mi (1.24 km)
- Coordinates: 37°57′25″N 105°34′00″W

Naming
- Etymology: Thomas Fitzpatrick, "Broken Hand"

Geography
- Location within Colorado Location within the United States
- Country: United States
- State: Colorado
- County: Custer / Saguache
- Protected area: Sangre de Cristo Wilderness
- Parent range: Rocky Mountains; Sangre de Cristo Range
- Topo map: USGS Crestone Peak

Geology
- Mountain type: Fault block

Climbing
- Easiest route: Hiking class 2

Broken Hand Peak is a 13,573-foot (4,137 m) mountain summit on the boundary shared by Custer and Saguache counties, in Colorado, United States.

== Description ==
Broken Hand Peak is set in the Sangre de Cristo Range which is a subrange of the Rocky Mountains. It is the 10th-highest summit in Custer County, and the 206th-highest in Colorado. Broken Hand Peak, 0.75 mile (1.2 km) southeast of Crestone Needle, is included within the official name "Crestone Peaks". The mountain is located in the Sangre de Cristo Wilderness on land managed by San Isabel National Forest and Rio Grande National Forest. Broken Hand Peak can be seen from Highway 69 south of the community of Westcliffe. Precipitation runoff from the mountain's eastern slopes drains into South Colony Creek, a tributary of Grape Creek, which in turn is a tributary of the Arkansas River, and the west slope drains into Cottonwood Creek which is a tributary of San Luis Creek. Topographic relief is significant as the summit rises 2,400 feet (732 m) above South Colony Creek in 0.75 mile (1.2 km).

== Etymology ==
The mountain's toponym was officially adopted in 1970 by the United States Board on Geographic Names to commemorate "Broken Hand" which was the Indian name of Thomas Fitzpatrick (1799–1854), an Indian agent and mountain man of the 1800s. He was known as "Broken Hand" after his left hand had been crippled in a firearms accident.

== Climate ==
According to the Köppen climate classification system, Broken Hand Peak is located in an alpine subarctic climate zone with cold, snowy winters, and cool to warm summers. Due to its altitude, it receives precipitation all year, as snow in winter, and as thunderstorms in summer, with a dry period in late spring. Climbers can expect afternoon rain, hail, and lightning from the seasonal monsoon in late July and August.

== Gallery ==
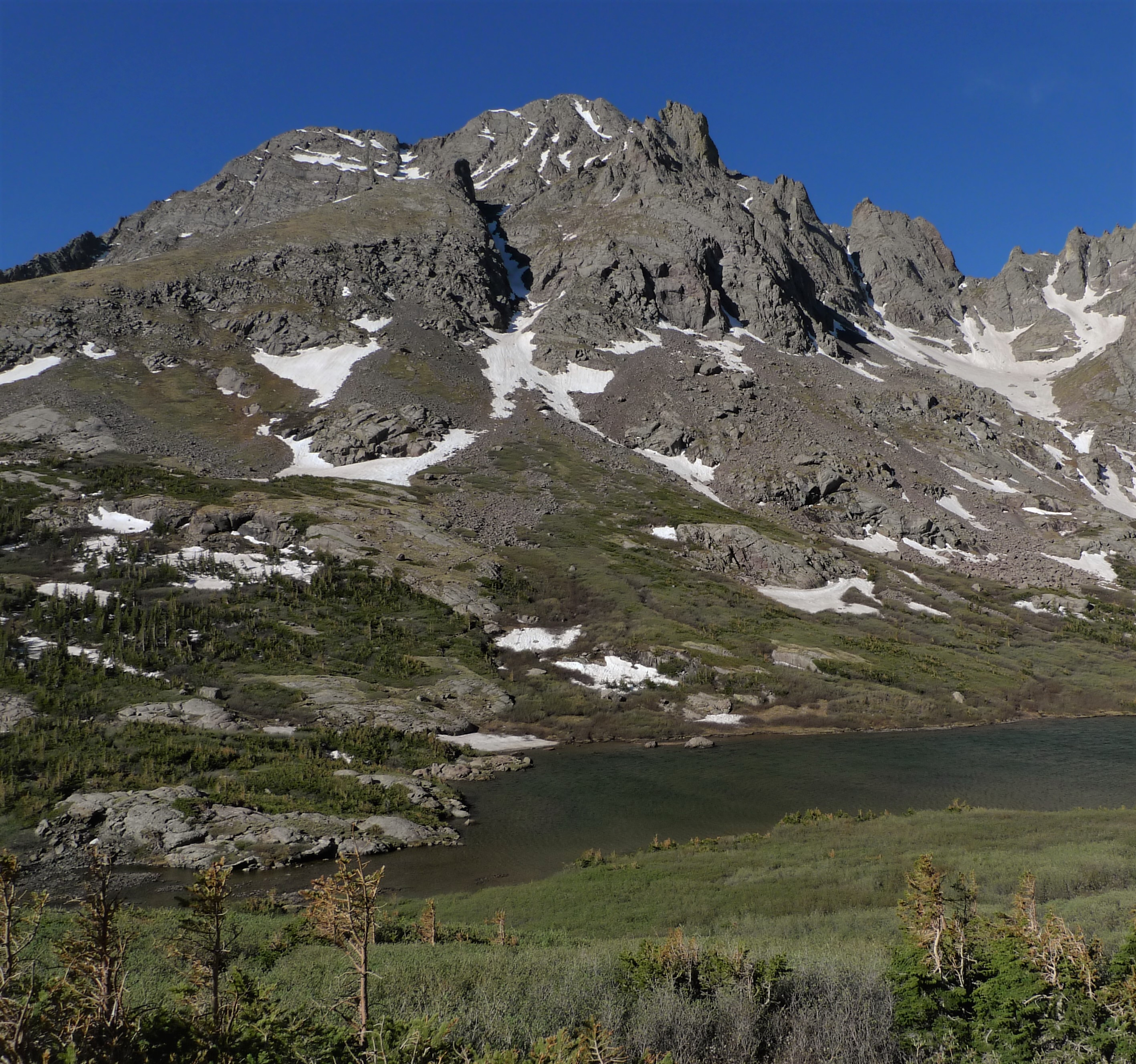
Broken Hand Peak, Lower South Colony Lake

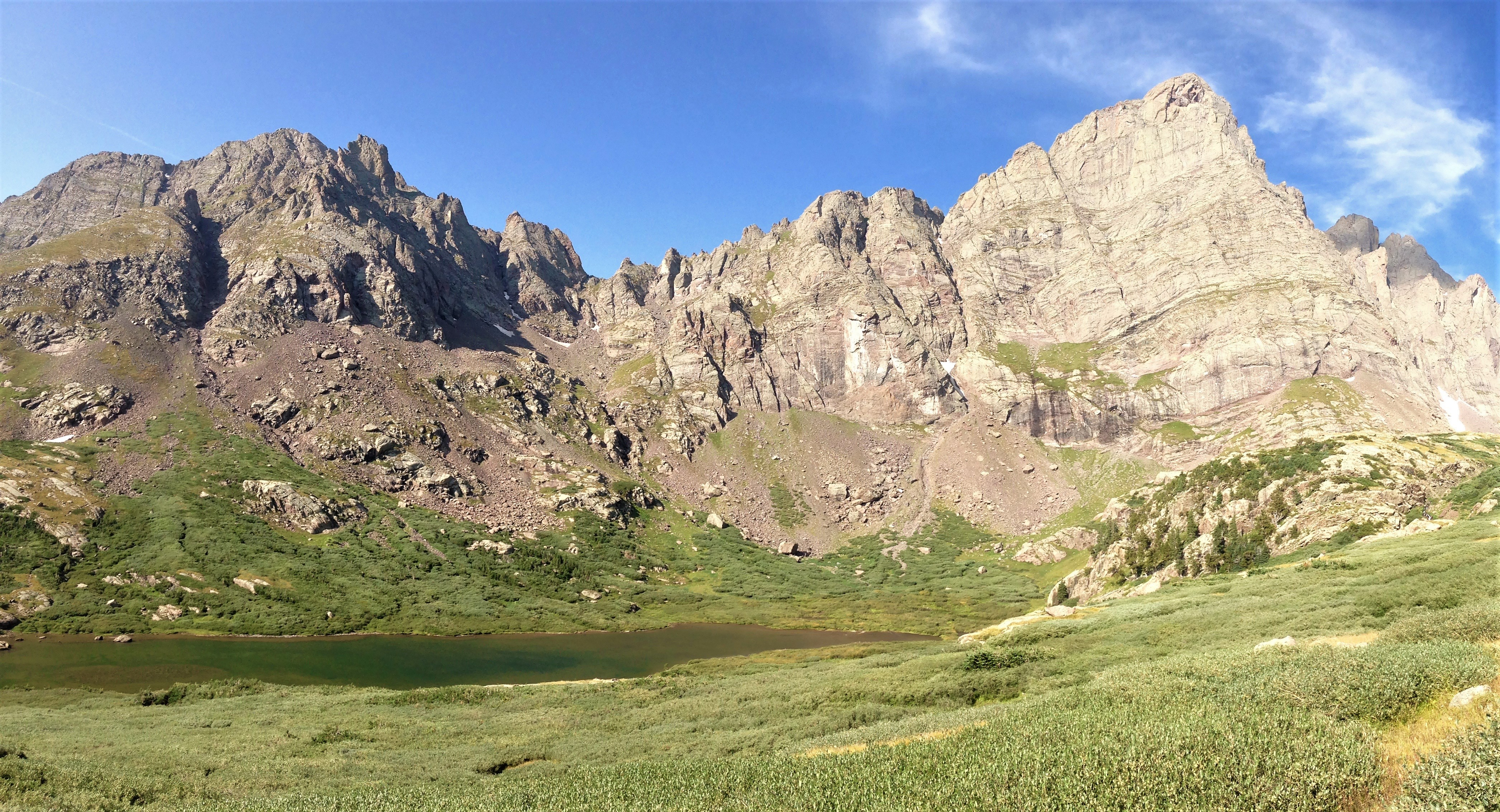
Broken Hand Peak (left). Crestone Needle (right), Lower South Colony Lake.

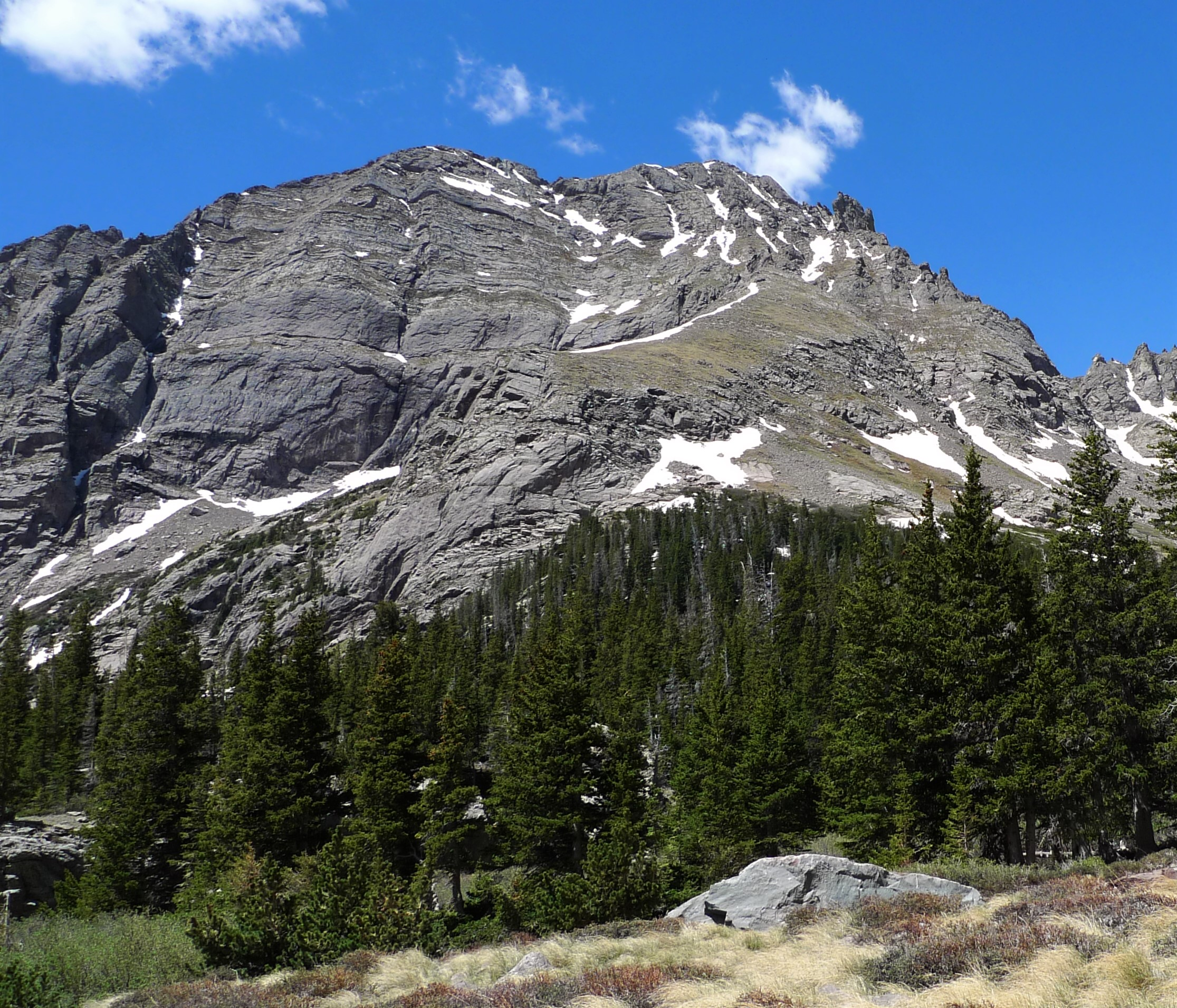
East aspect

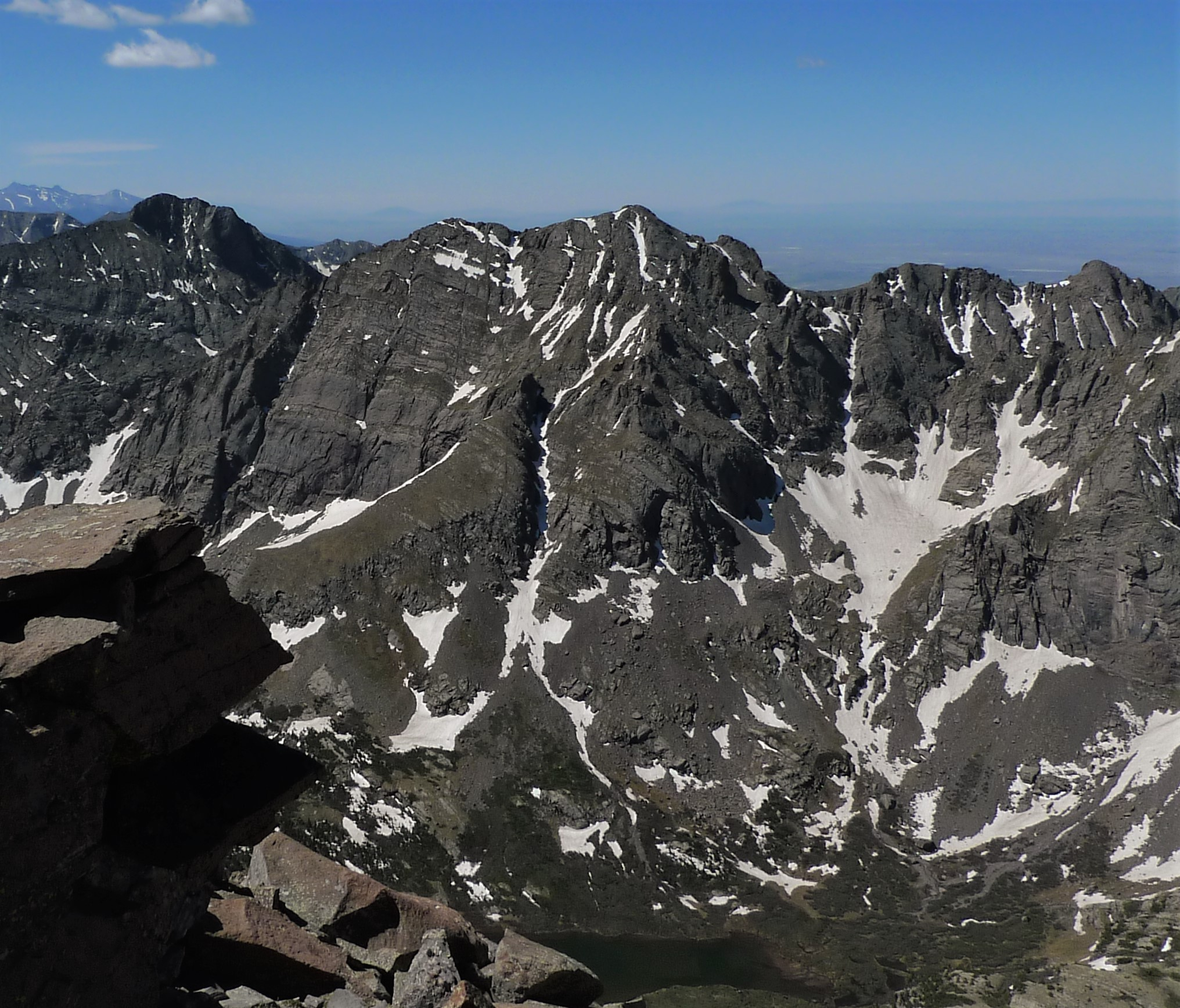
Broken Hand Peak (center), Pico Aislado (left) seen from Humboldt Peak

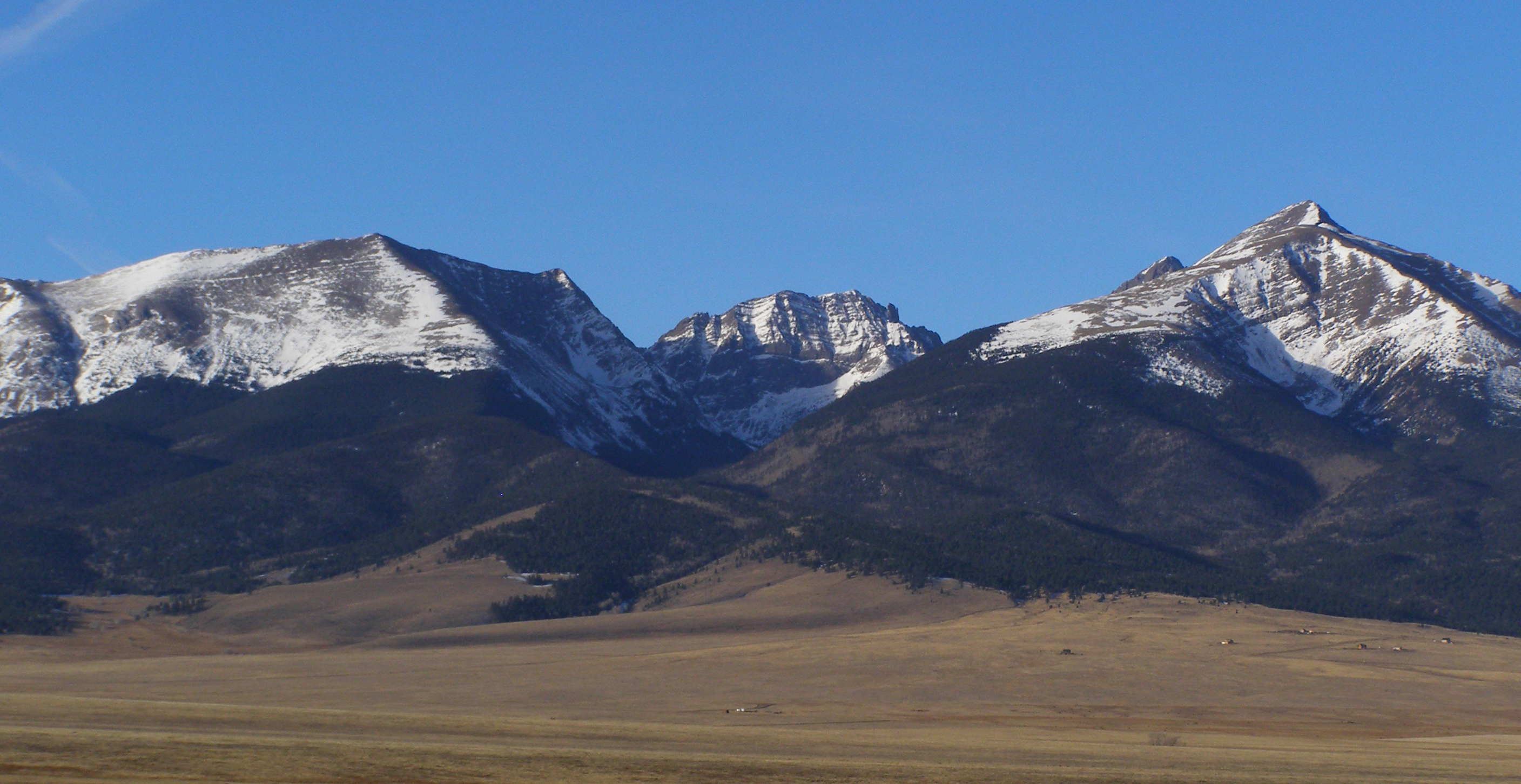
Broken Hand Peak (centered), Humboldt Peak (right)

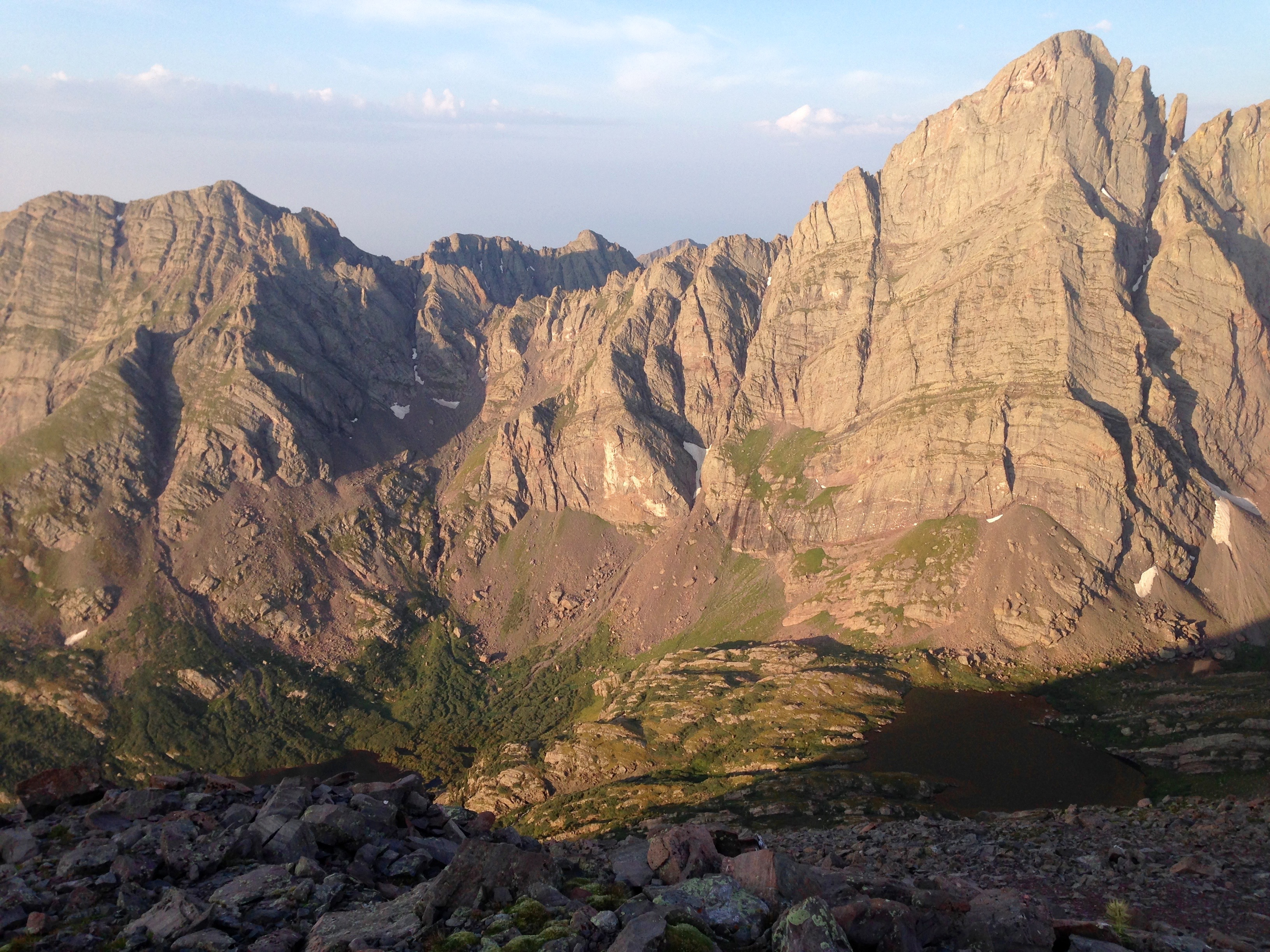
Broken Hand Peak (left). Crestone Needle (right)

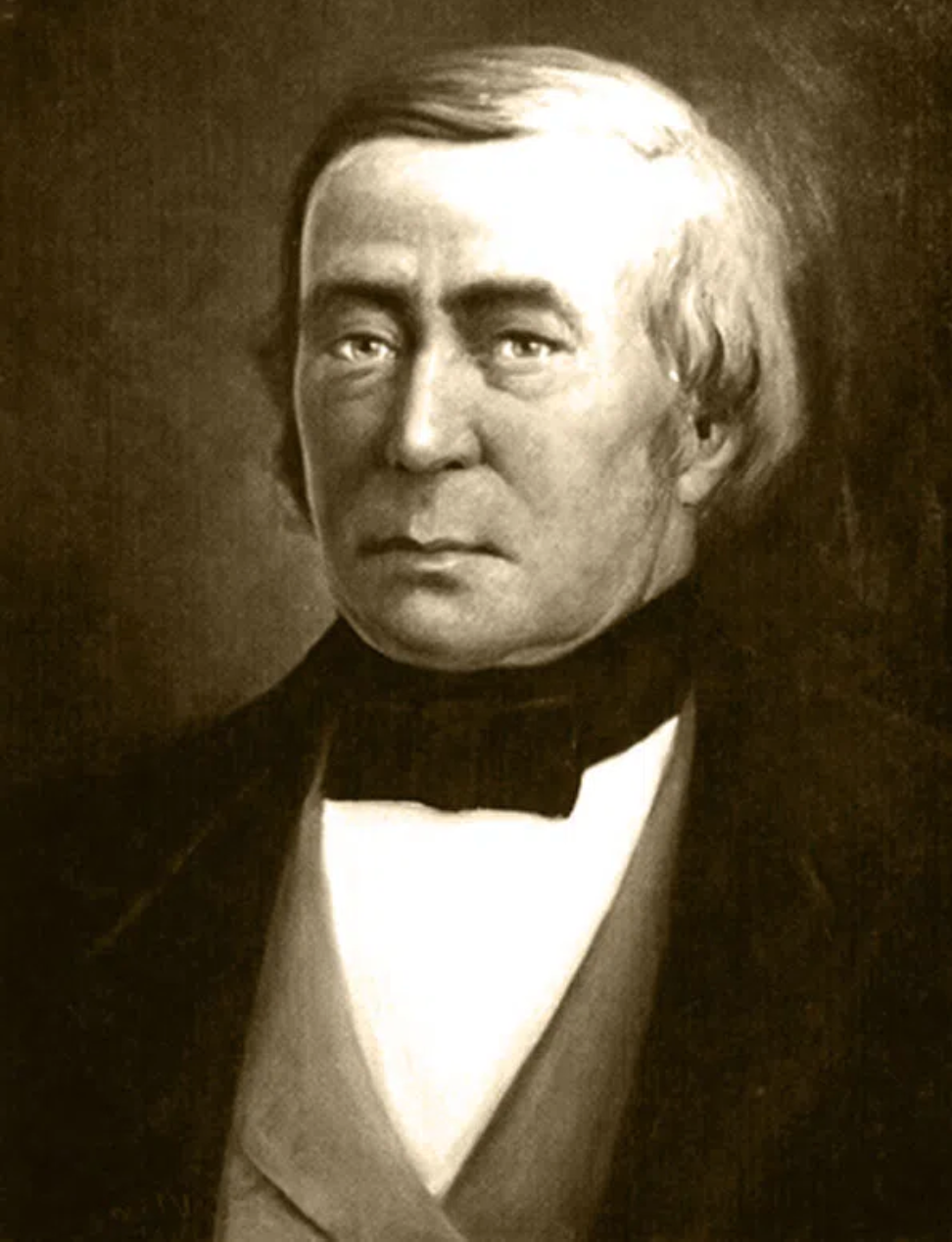
Thomas Fitzpatrick, aka "Broken Hand"

== See also ==
- Crestones
- Sangre de Cristo Mountains
- Thirteener
