= Columbia Point =

Mountain summit in Colorado, United States

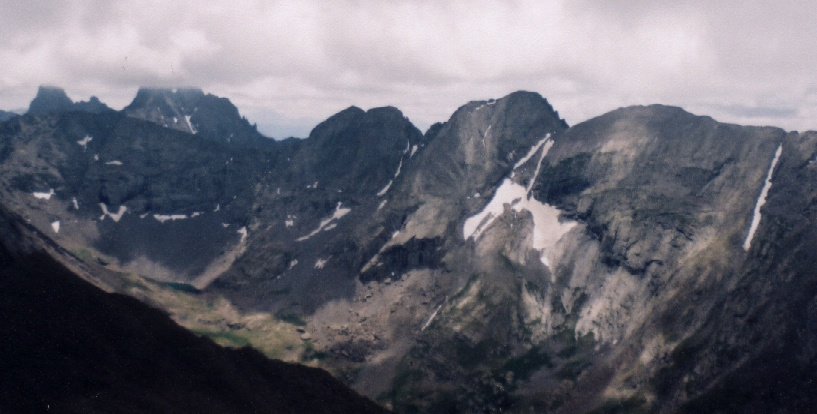
- The Crestone Group as seen from Mount Adams. From left to right: Crestone Needle, Crestone Peak, Columbia Point, Kit Carson Peak, Challenger Point.

Highest point
- Elevation: 13,986 ft (4,263 m)
- Prominence: 360 ft (110 m)
- Parent peak: Kit Carson Mountain
- Isolation: 0.25 mi (0.40 km)
- Coordinates: 37°58′44″N 105°35′53″W

Geography
- Location within Colorado
- Location: Saguache County, Colorado, United States
- Parent range: Sangre de Cristo Range, Crestones
- Topo map(s): USGS 7.5' topographic map Crestone Peak, Colorado

Climbing
- First ascent: unknown (probably climbed as part of an ascent of Kit Carson Mountain)
- Easiest route: Difficult class 2

Columbia Point is a high mountain summit of the Crestones in the Sangre de Cristo Range of the Rocky Mountains of North America. The 13,986-foot (4,263 m) thirteener is located 5.5 miles (8.8 km) east by south (bearing 102°) of the Town of Crestone in Saguache County, Colorado, United States. The Crestones are a cluster of high summits in the Sangre de Cristo Range, comprising Crestone Peak, Crestone Needle, Kit Carson Peak, Challenger Point, Humboldt Peak, and Columbia Point.

Columbia Point is subpeak of Kit Carson Mountain. It was known informally as Kat Carson, but was officially named Columbia Point in 2003 to honor the seven astronauts who died when the Space Shuttle Columbia disintegrated during re-entry on February 1, 2003. With a topographic prominence over 300 ft (91 m), it qualifies as a separate summit under the standard cutoff, but it is not a well-known peak.

== The Memorial ==
The USGS Board of Geographic Names approved the name of Columbia Point in June, 2003. On the weekend of August 7, 2003, a group consisting of family members, astronauts, friends and climbers installed a memorial plaque on the summit. The trip included a dedication service for the memorial, and an F16 flyby in missing man formation.

Today, we name a point in the Sangre de Cristo Mountains of Colorado in honor of the Space Shuttle Columbia. Seven brave astronauts perished during her final mission on February 1, 2003. Columbia Point is an appropriate honor for this shuttle's last voyage. Those who explore space in the days ahead may gaze back at Earth - and know that Columbia Point is there to commend a noble mission. The point looks up to the heavens and it allows us, once again, to thank our heroes who soared far beyond the mountain, traveled past the sky -- and live on in our memories forever.

— Interior Secretary Gale A. Norton

The plaque reads:

COLUMBIA POINT, 13,980'

In Memory of the Crew of Shuttle Columbia
Seven who died accepting the risk,
Expanding humankind's horizons
February 1, 2003
"Mankind is led into the darkness beyond
our world by the inspiration of discovery
and the longing to understand. Our
journey into space will go on."

President George W. Bush

== Historical names ==
- Columbia Point – 2003
- East Summit
- Kat Carson Mountain

== See also ==
- Challenger Point
- Crestones
- List of Colorado mountain ranges
- List of Colorado mountain summits
  - List of Colorado fourteeners
  - List of Colorado 4000 meter prominent summits
  - List of the most prominent summits of Colorado
- List of Colorado county high points
