= Kit Carson Peak =

Mountain in the state of Colorado

Kit Carson Mountain
- Kit Carson Peak
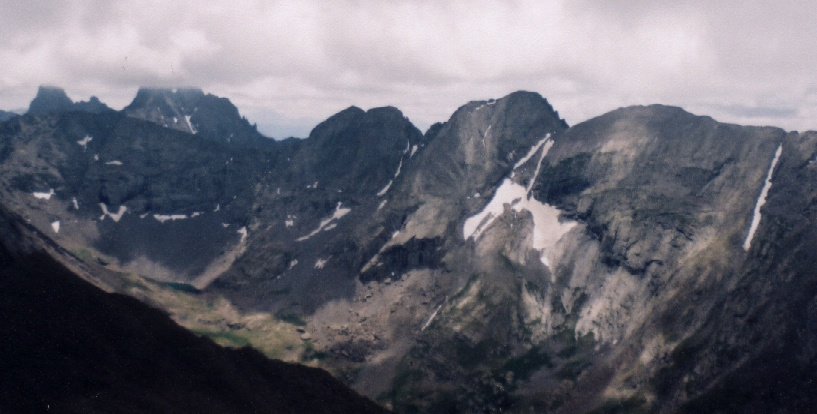
- The Crestones as seen from Mount Adams. From left to right: Crestone Needle, Crestone Peak, Columbia Point, Kit Carson Peak, and Challenger Point.

Highest point
- Elevation: 14,165.2 ft (4,317.6 m); NAPGD2022
- Prominence: 1,025 ft (312 m)
- Isolation: 1.27 mi (2.04 km)
- Listing: Colorado Fourteener 23rd
- Coordinates: 37°58′47″N 105°36′09″W

Geography
- Location within Colorado
- Location: Saguache County, Colorado, United States
- Parent range: Sangre de Cristo Range, Crestones
- Topo map(s): USGS 7.5' topographic map Crestone Peak, Colorado

Climbing
- Easiest route: Via Challenger Point: Easy Scramble, class 3

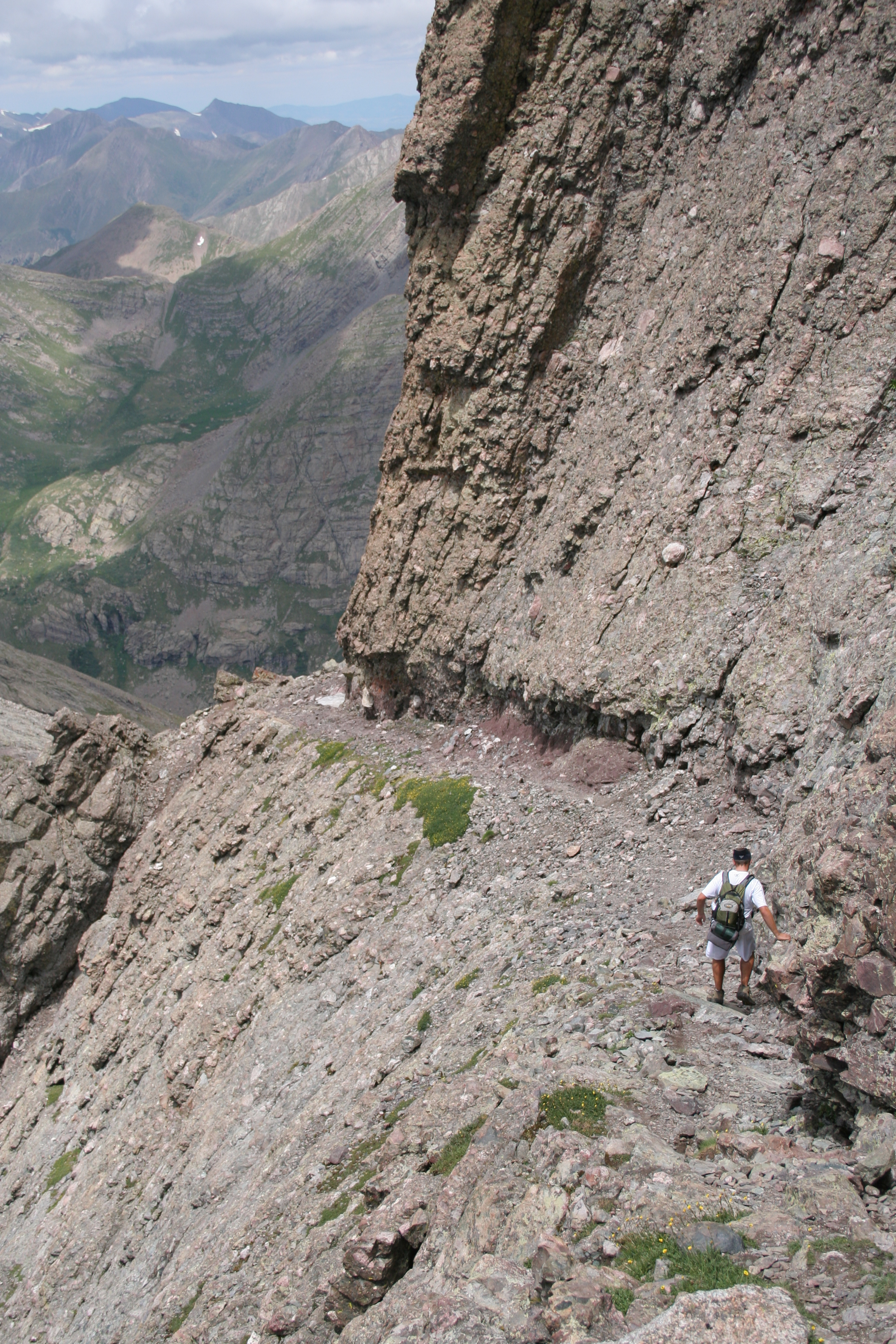
Kit Carson Avenue with a climber descending.

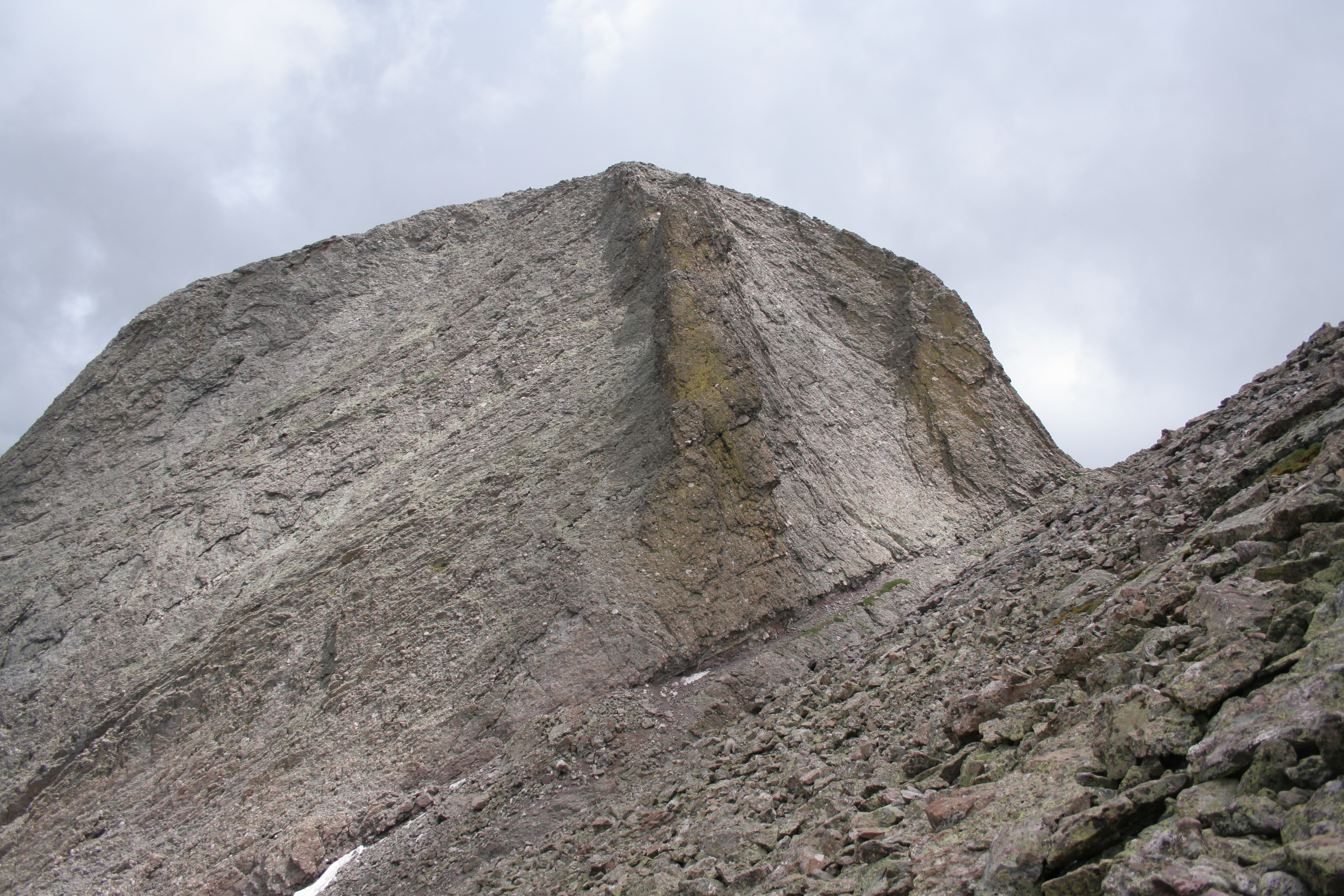
Kit Carson Peak as seen from the saddle between it and Challenger Point.

Kit Carson Peak, officially known as the Kit Carson Mountain, is a high mountain summit of the Crestones in the Sangre de Cristo Range of the Rocky Mountains of North America. The 14,165.2-foot (4,318 m) fourteener is located 5.2 miles (8.4 km) ESE (bearing 102°) of the Town of Crestone in Saguache County, Colorado, United States. The name Kit Carson Mountain is used for both the massif with three summits (Columbia Point, Kit Carson Peak and Challenger Point), or to describe the main summit only. The mountain is named in honor of American frontiersman Christopher Houston "Kit" Carson. The Crestones are a cluster of high summits in the Sangre de Cristo Range, comprising Crestone Peak, Crestone Needle, Kit Carson Peak, Challenger Point, Humboldt Peak, and Columbia Point. They are usually accessed from common trailheads.

== History ==
In January 2002, the Nature Conservancy announced the signing of a $31 million purchase agreement for the Baca Ranch. The purchase significantly expanded the Great Sand Dunes National Park and Preserve in 2004. As part of that complex transaction Kit Carson Mountain was transferred to the Sangre de Cristo Wilderness within the Rio Grande National Forest.

Kit Carson Mountain features complex terrain that has misled climbers in the past, often contributing to their perishment in the most recent years.

Incidentally, local residents for decades had called the mountain "Crestone Peak" (the official name of a neighboring peak), and never called it by "that other name".

== Climbing ==
One popular route on Kit Carson Mountain climbs from the west side of the range, starting at Willow Creek Trailhead (elevation: 8,900 ft or 2,700 m). This route first climbs Challenger Point, just to the west of Kit Carson. Climbing from the saddle between Challenger Point to Kit Carson peak involves crossing a path commonly called 'Kit Carson Avenue'. Total elevation gain for this route is 6,250 ft (1,905 m), in a 14 miles (23 km) round-trip.

Kit Carson can also be reached from the east side of the Sangre de Cristos via the South Colony Lakes access. (A four-wheel drive road currently provides relatively a high elevation trailhead; however this road will be closed halfway up on October 13, 2009.) This route starts by using part of the trail for Humboldt Peak, and then traverses a ridge and plateau toward Kit Carson. A sub-peak named Columbia Point (informally known as "Kat Carson") is climbed on the way to the main summit.

Kit Carson does not have any glaciers but it does have a semi-permanent ice patch on its rugged north face, which rarely melts even in the driest years (such as 2002 and 2006). During the summer Kit Carson and the neighboring peaks are hit with a diurnal cycle of thunder storms, which often form within a short time period; lightning occurs almost daily and has killed climbers as recently as 2003.

Fatalities also occur because climbers make the mistake of descending the couloir (gulley) between the summit and Challenger Point. Though the couloir looks like a short cut down, and starts off gently enough, it leads to ice fields, and on the edges it quickly becomes cliffed-out, with patches of scree and loose rock, ending in sheer and highly technical terrain. Search and Rescue teams regularly recover bodies from the bottom of the couloir. Bodies that do not make it to the bottom require highly specialized technical teams, not local to the area, and thus not as quickly available to respond.

== Names ==
- Frustum Peak
- Crestone peak
- Haystack Baldy
- Kit Carson Mountain – 1970
- Kit Carson Peak
- Ritrö Gonpö, coined by American Buddhist teacher Reggie Ray

== See also ==
- List of mountain peaks of Colorado
  - List of Colorado fourteeners
