= Colony Baldy =

Mountain in Colorado, United States

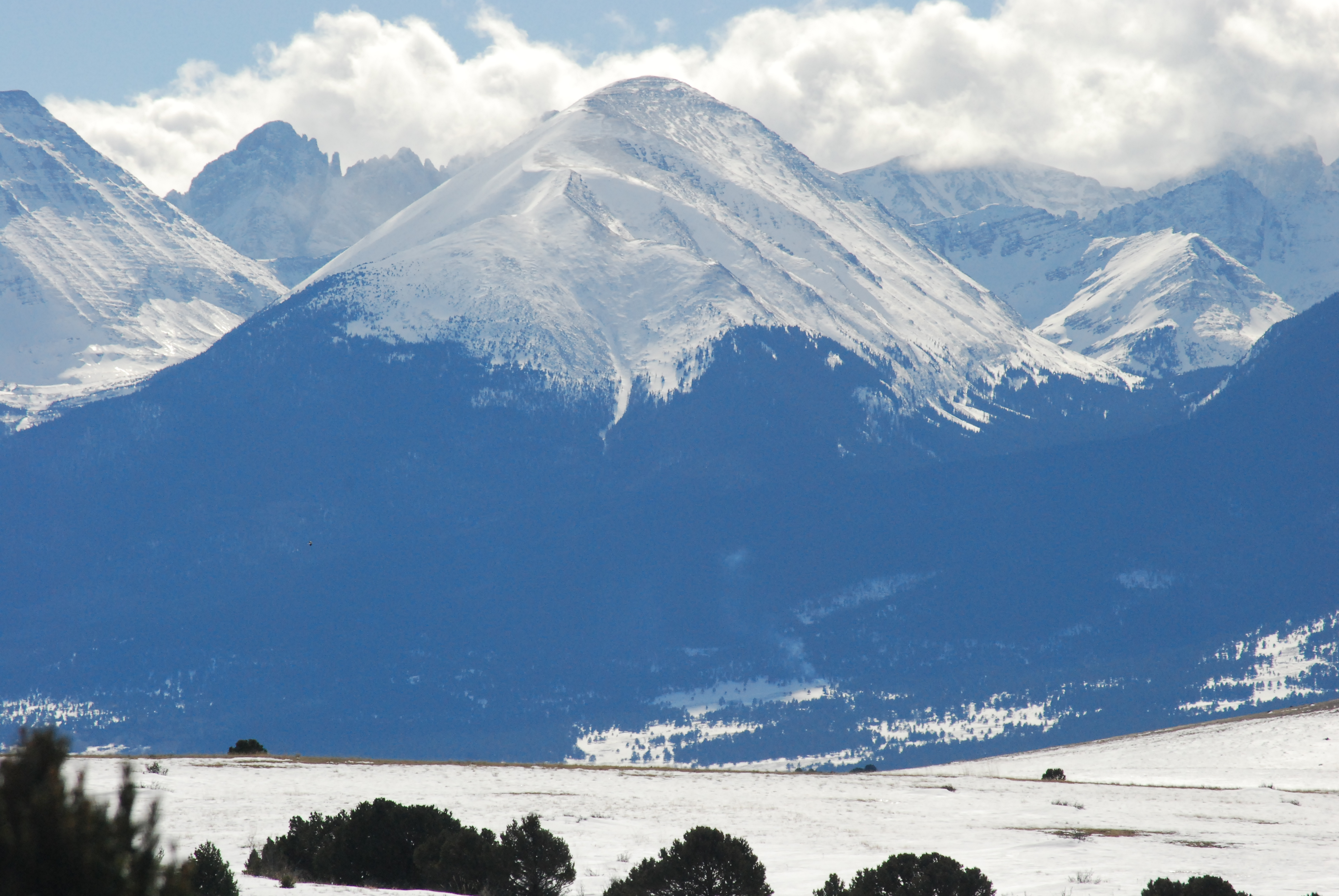
- Northeast aspect

Highest point
- Elevation: 13,705 ft (4,177 m)
- Prominence: 922 ft (281 m)
- Parent peak: Humboldt Peak (14,070 ft)
- Isolation: 1.36 mi (2.19 km)
- Coordinates: 37°59′44″N 105°33′37″W

Geography
- Location within Colorado Location within the United States
- Country: United States
- State: Colorado
- County: Custer
- Protected area: Sangre de Cristo Wilderness
- Parent range: Rocky Mountains; Sangre de Cristo Range
- Topo map: USGS Crestone Peak

Geology
- Mountain type: Fault block

Climbing
- Easiest route: Hiking class 2

Colony Baldy is a 13,705-foot (4,177 m) mountain summit in Custer County, Colorado, United States.

== Description ==
Colony Baldy is set in the Sangre de Cristo Range which is a subrange of the Rocky Mountains. It is the seventh-highest summit in Custer County, and the 153rd-highest in Colorado. Colony Baldy can be seen from Highway 69 near the community of Westcliffe. The mountain is located in the Sangre de Cristo Wilderness on land managed by San Isabel National Forest. Precipitation runoff from the mountain's slopes drains into tributaries of Grape Creek which in turn is a tributary of the Arkansas River. Topographic relief is significant as the summit rises 2,450 feet (747 m) above North Colony Creek in 0.8 mile (1.3 km) and 2,200 feet (671 m) above Macey Lake in 0.67 mile (1.1 km). An ascent of the peak involves hiking 17 miles (27 km) round-trip with 4,700 feet (1,433 m) of elevation gain. The mountain's toponym was officially adopted in 1970 by the United States Board on Geographic Names.

== Climate ==
According to the Köppen climate classification system, Colony Baldy is located in an alpine subarctic climate zone with cold, snowy winters, and cool to warm summers. Due to its altitude, it receives precipitation all year, as snow in winter, and as thunderstorms in summer, with a dry period in late spring.

== See also ==
- Sangre de Cristo Mountains
- Thirteener

== Gallery ==
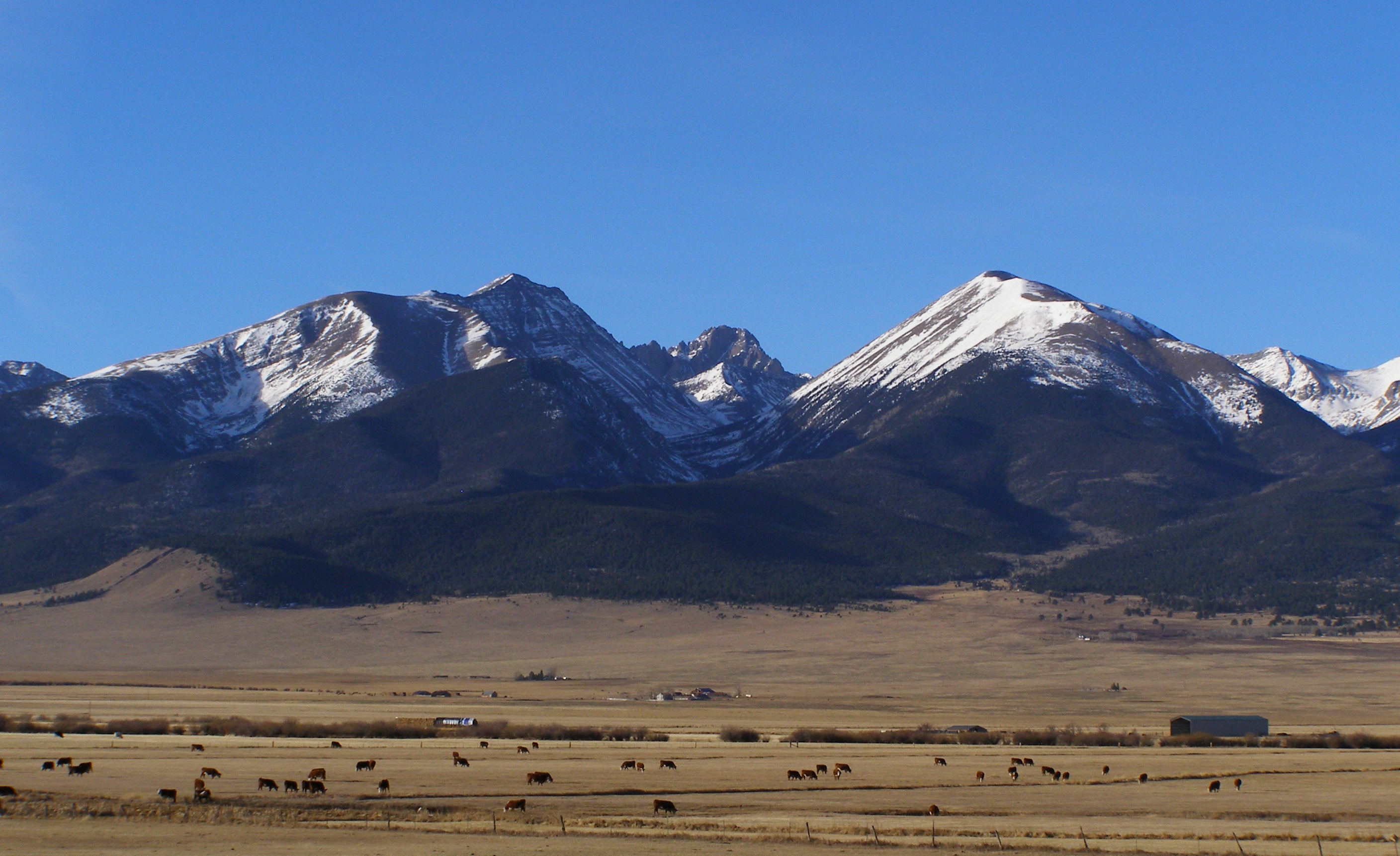
Humboldt Peak (left) and Colony Baldy (right)

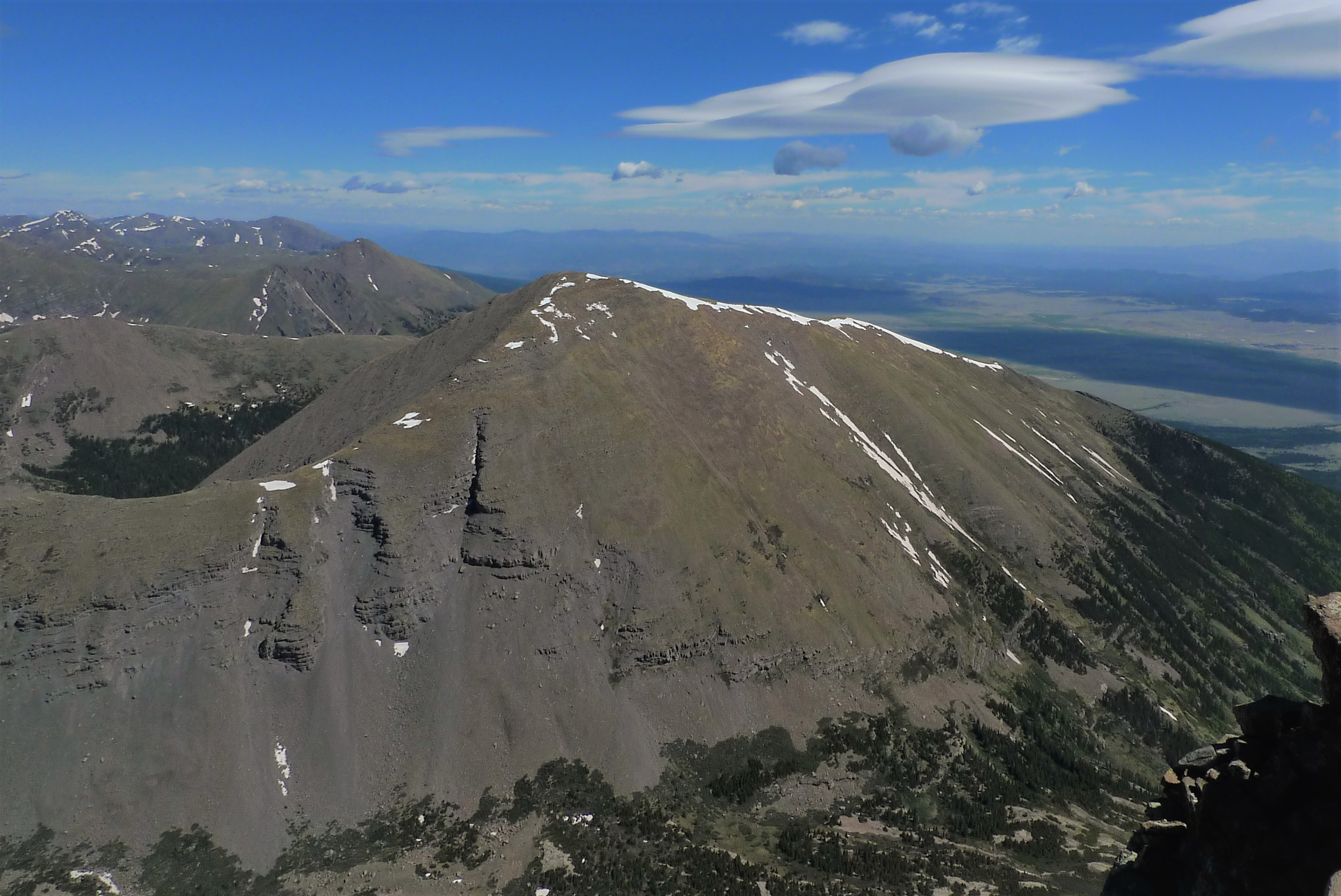
South aspect of Colony Baldy viewed from Humboldt Peak
