= Ellingwood Ledges =

Climbing route on Crestone Needle in Colorado, USA

Ellingwood Arete
- Ellingwood Route or Ellingwood Arete
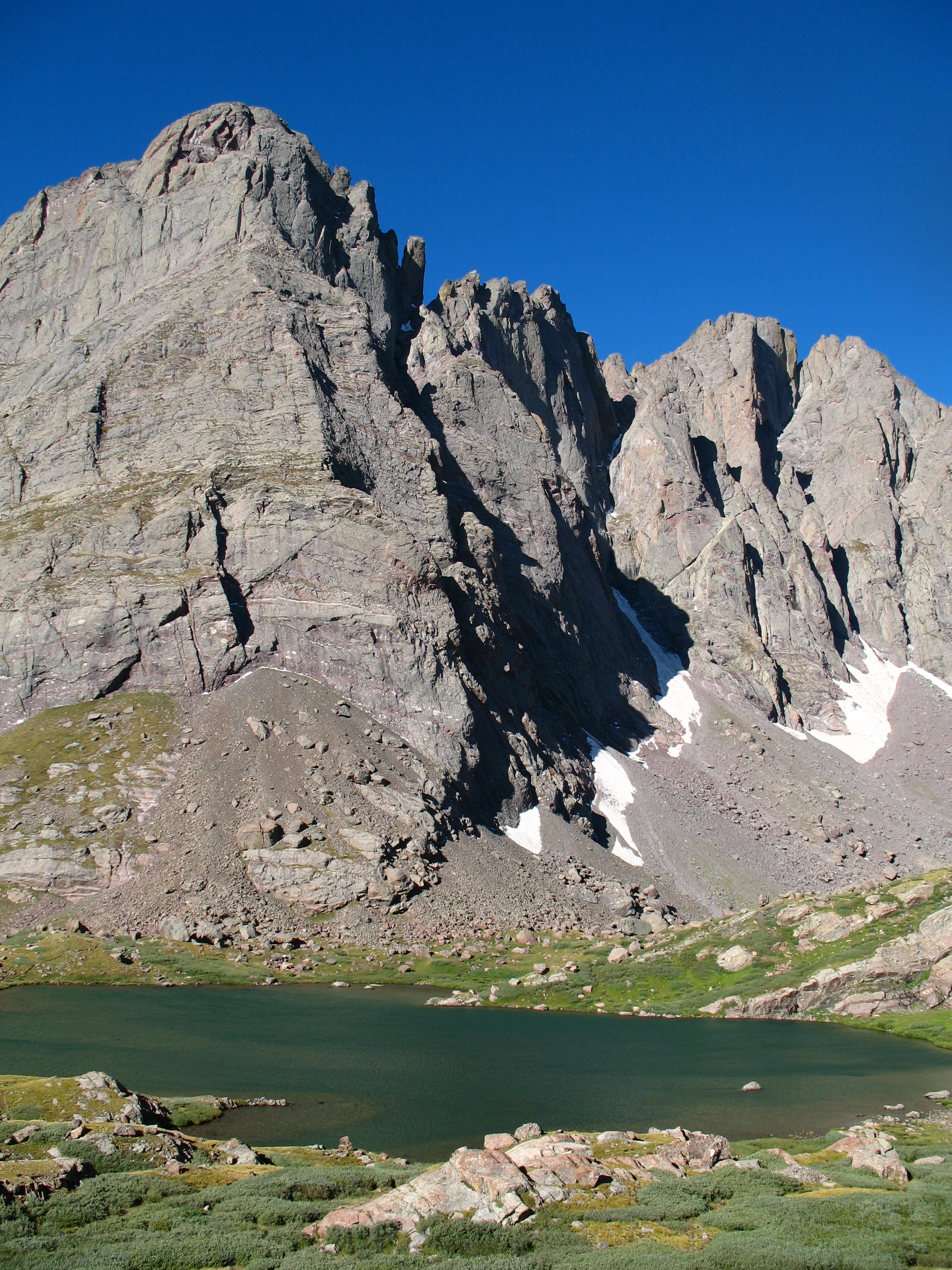
- Crestone Needle, with the lower South Colony lake in the foreground. The Ellingwood Ledges climb the prominent arete.
- Location: Crestone Needle, Colorado, USA
- Coordinates: 37.96470°N 105.5761°W
- Climbing area: Sangre de Cristo Range, Rocky Mountains
- Route type: Trad/Alpine
- Technical grade: 5.7
- NCCS grade: III
- First ascent: Albert R. Ellingwood and Eleanor Davis August 1925.

The Ellingwood Arete (also known as Ellingwood Route or Ellingwood Ledges or some combination thereof) is a popular technical climbing route on Crestone Needle in Colorado's Sangre de Cristo Range. The Ellingwood Ledges Route is recognized in the historic climbing text Fifty Classic Climbs of North America. An "arete" is "a sharp narrow ridge found in rugged mountains".

Albert R. Ellingwood was a pioneering member of the Colorado Mountain Club and the first to climb the Crestones On these climbs including the 1925 ascent of the arete, Ellingwood was partnered with the long lived Eleanor Davis.

The route is technically difficult, and the site of multiple climbing fatalities.
