= Albert R. Ellingwood =

American mountain climber (1887–1934)

Elmer Albert Russell Ellingwood (22 June 1887 in Cedar Rapids, Iowa– 12 May 1934) was a pioneering mountaineer and climber in the western United States during the first half of the twentieth century. He made first ascents of many peaks and routes in the Rocky Mountains, particularly in Colorado, including Lizard Head in the San Juan Mountains, Ellingwood Ridge on La Plata Peak in the Sawatch Range, and Crestone Needle in the Sangre de Cristo Range. Many mountain features are named for him, on peaks such as Middle Teton, on which Ellingwood made the first ascent, the Ellingwood Ridge of La Plata Peak, and the Ellingwood Arete ascent of Crestone Needle; the fourteener Ellingwood Point, near Blanca Peak in southern Colorado, is named for him as well.

Ellingwood died during a medical procedure at the age of 46. At that time he was assistant dean at Northwestern University. Ellingwood was a Rhodes Scholar at Merton College, Oxford, from 1910 to 1913, and later became Professor of Political Science at Colorado College.

His "firsts" in climbs included the aforementioned Crestone Needle 1916 and again by the arete in 1925. In 1923, in conjunction with Eleanor Ehrman Davis, he made the first ascent of the South Teton as well the 3rd or 4th ascent of the Grand Teton.

== Personal life ==
He was married to Rea Schimpeler and had two sons, Robert Whitcomb and Donald.
