= Crestones =

Group of mountains in Colorado, United States

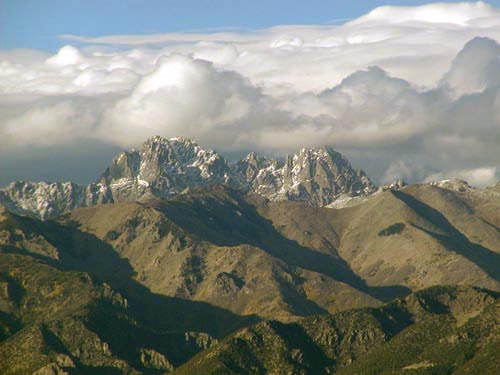
- Crestone Peak and Crestone Needle seen from the south

Highest point
- Peak: Crestone Peak
- Elevation: 14,300 feet (4,359 m)
- Listing: Mountain ranges of Colorado
- Coordinates: 37°58′00″N 105°35′07″W

Geography
- Location within Colorado
- Country: United States
- State: Colorado
- Range coordinates: 37°58′01″N 105°35′07″W
- Parent range: Sangre de Cristo Range

The Crestones are a group of four 14,000-foot (4,300 m) peaks (fourteeners) in the Sangre de Cristo Range above Crestone, central southern Colorado, comprising:

1. Crestone Peak (14,294 ft; 4,357 m )
2. Crestone Needle (14,197 ft; 4,327 m )
3. Kit Carson Mountain (14,165 ft; 4,317 m )
4. Humboldt Peak (14,064 ft; 4,287 m )

Snow is usually mostly melted by early July. Climbers can expect afternoon rain, hail, and lightning from the seasonal monsoon in late July and August.

== Climbing ==
- Crestone Peak and Crestone Needle are rock scrambles (Class 3) with some exposure.
- Kit Carson Mountain is a walk-up (Class 2), but only if the correct route is carefully followed; it has claimed more lives than Crestone Peak or Crestone Needle. Challenger Point (14,081 ft; 4,292 m ) and Columbia Point (13,980-foot (4,261 m)) are sub-peaks of Kit Carson Mountain.
- Humboldt Peak is the easiest of the four, with a straightforward walk-up route. Sometimes Humboldt is not included in the term "The Crestones."

Broken Hand Peak, 13,573 ft (4,137 m), southeast of Crestone Needle, is included within the official name "Crestone Peaks". Mount Adams (13,931 ft; 4,246 m ) is a notable peak just to the north of the Crestones, and is quite rugged.

Note that Crestone Peak and Crestone Needle are somewhat more technical climbs than many Colorado fourteeners; caution is advised. About one person per year is killed on the Crestones; occasionally they are skilled mountaineers.

== See also ==
  - Rocky Mountains
    - Southern Rocky Mountains
      - Sangre de Cristo Mountains
        - Sangre de Cristo Range
- Geography of Colorado
  - Mountain ranges of Colorado
    - Mountain peaks of Colorado
    - Mountain passes of Colorado
- Outline of Colorado
- Index of Colorado-related articles
