= Crestone Needle =

Mountain in Colorado, USA

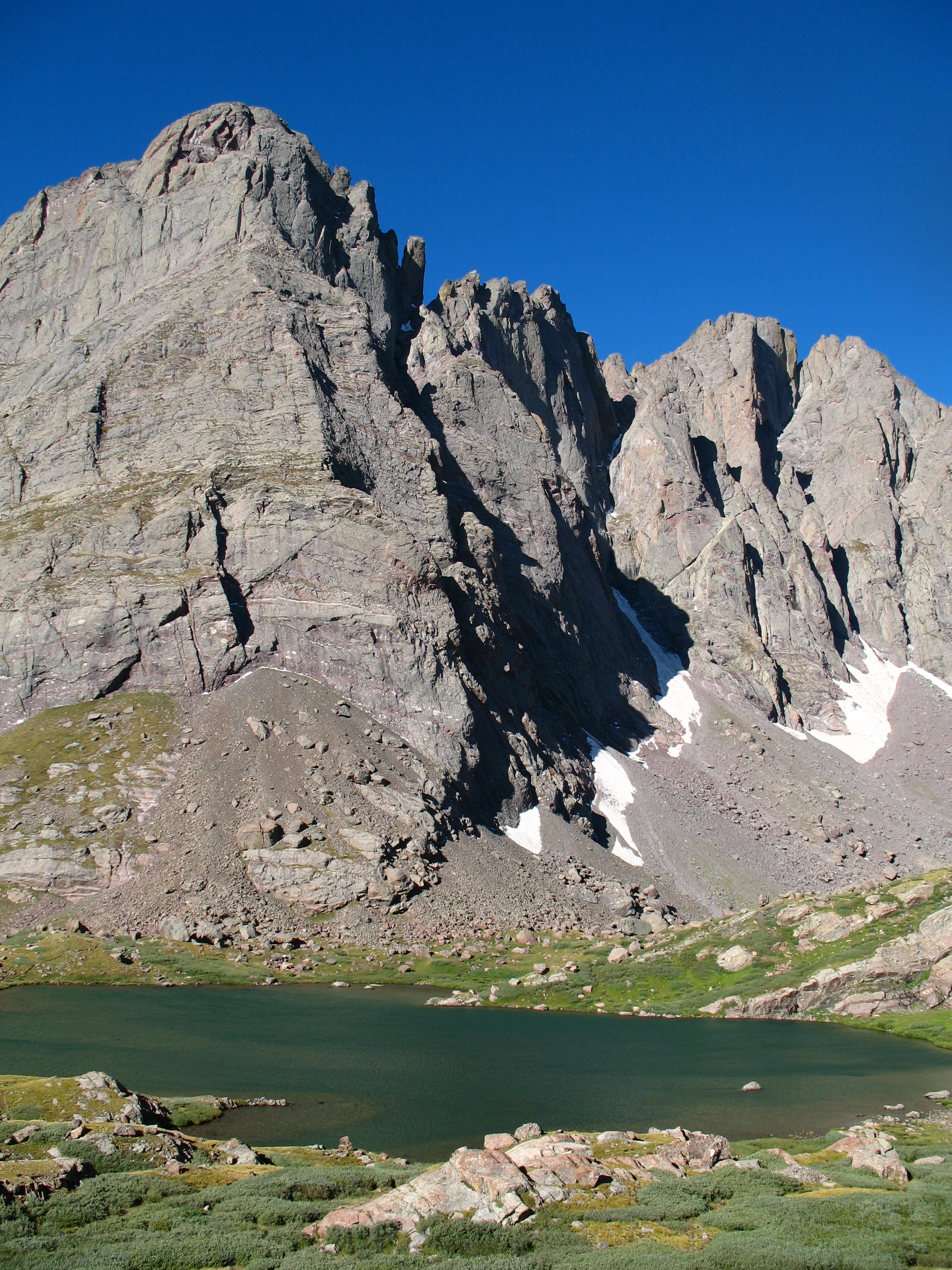
- Crestone Needle, with the upper South Colony lake in the foreground.

Highest point
- Elevation: 14,194.8 ft (4,326.6 m); NAPGD2022
- Prominence: 457 ft (139 m)
- Isolation: 0.45 mi (0.72 km)
- Listing: Colorado Fourteener 20th
- Coordinates: 37°57′53″N 105°34′36″W

Geography
- Location within Colorado
- Location: Custer and Saguache counties, Colorado, United States
- Parent range: Sangre de Cristo Range, Crestones
- Topo map(s): USGS 7.5' topographic map Crestone Peak, Colorado

Climbing
- First ascent: July 24, 1916 by Albert Ellingwood and Eleanor Davis
- Easiest route: South Face: Climb, class 4

Crestone Needle is a high mountain summit of the Crestones in the Sangre de Cristo Range of the Rocky Mountains of North America. The 14,194.8-foot (4,327 m) fourteener is located 6.9 miles (11.1 km) east-southeast (bearing 108°) of the Town of Crestone in Saguache County, Colorado, United States. The Crestones are a cluster of high summits in the Sangre de Cristo Range, comprising Crestone Peak, Crestone Needle, Kit Carson Peak, Challenger Point, Humboldt Peak, and Columbia Point. They are usually accessed from common trailheads.

== Climbing ==
While not as high as Crestone Peak, and connected to it by a high, jagged ridge, Crestone Needle is regarded as a worthy climb in its own right. The easiest route is the South Face (or South Couloir), usually accessed via Broken Hand Pass from South Colony Lakes. This is a slightly exposed scramble with a few tricky moves, and is one of the more difficult standard routes among the Colorado fourteeners. However the classic route on the mountain is the Ellingwood Arete, also known as the Ellingwood Ledges Route. This is a steep ridge on the northeast side of the peak, leading directly up from the Upper South Colony Lake basin to the summit. It is a mildly technical rock climb (5.7 on the Yosemite Decimal Scale). It is particularly popular because of its inclusion in the well-known book Fifty Classic Climbs of North America by Steve Roper and Allen Steck.

The peak consists mainly of granite and conglomerate. Knobby handholds are frequent near the summit. Snow fields linger around the peak throughout the summer.

Almost all fatalities on the peak occur on either the Class 4 traverse from Crestone Peak or the technical Ellingwood Ledges Route.

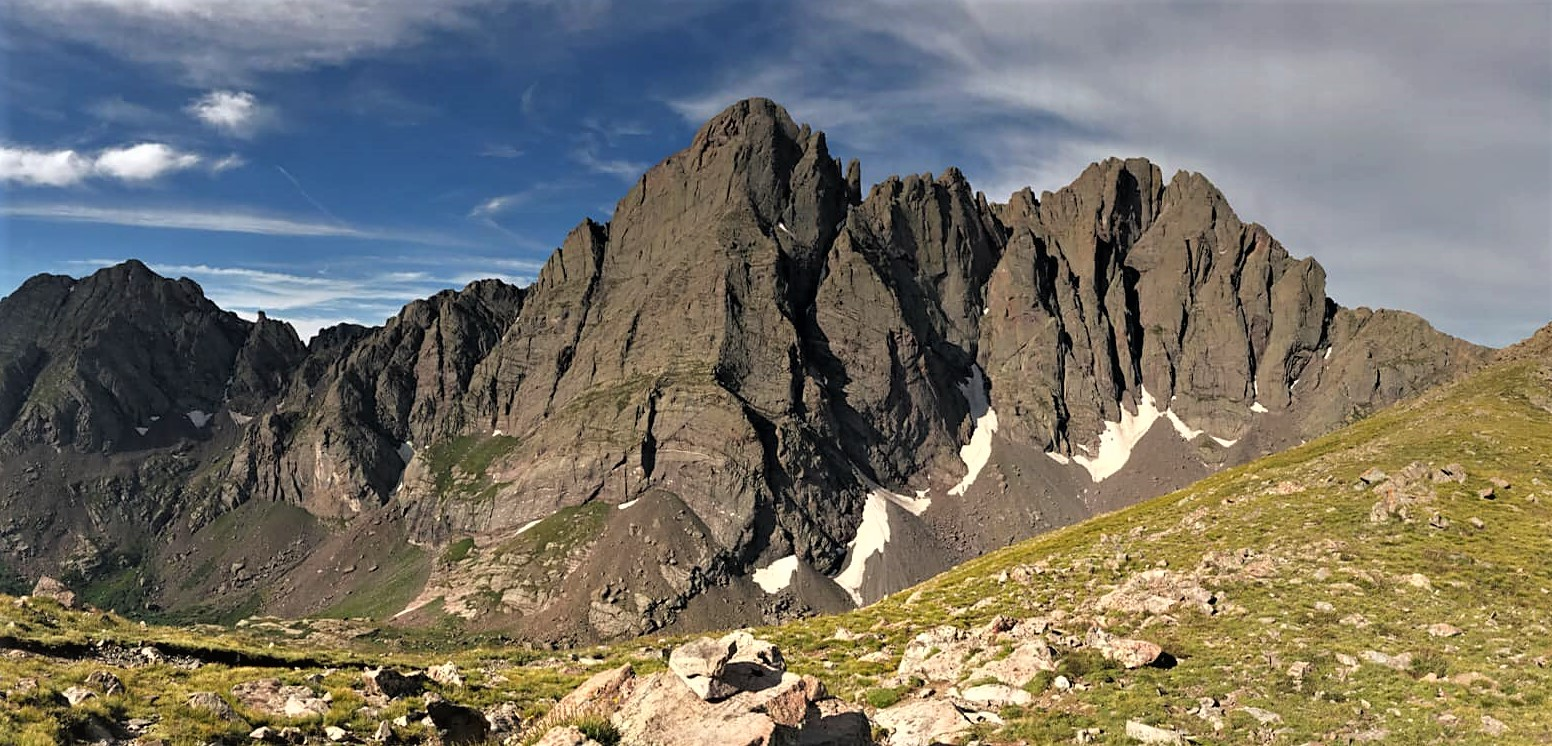
North aspect seen from Humboldt Peak's West Ridge

== See also ==
- List of mountain peaks of Colorado
  - List of Colorado fourteeners
