= Challenger Point =

Mountain in Colorado, United States

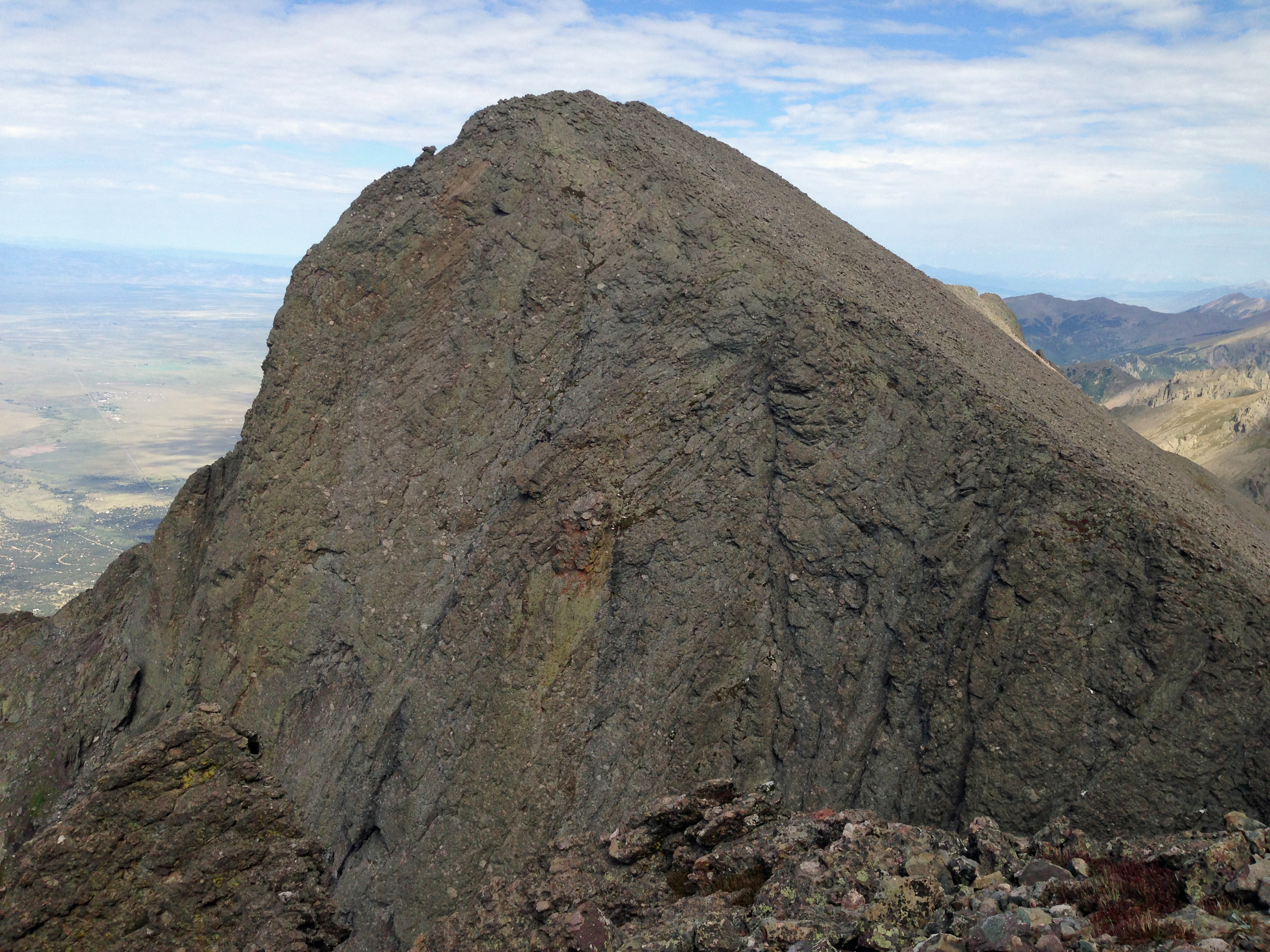
- Challenger Point seen from nearby Kit Carson Mountain.

Highest point
- Elevation: 14,084.6 ft (4,293.0 m); NAPGD2022
- Prominence: 301 ft (92 m)
- Parent peak: Kit Carson Mountain
- Isolation: 0.22 mi (0.35 km)
- Listing: Colorado Fourteener 34th
- Coordinates: 37°58′49″N 105°36′24″W

Geography
- Location within Colorado
- Location: Saguache County, Colorado, United States
- Parent range: Sangre de Cristo Range, Crestones
- Topo map(s): USGS 7.5' topographic map Crestone Peak, Colorado

Climbing
- Easiest route: North Slope: Difficult Hike, class 2

Challenger Point is a high mountain summit of the Crestones in the Sangre de Cristo Range of the Rocky Mountains of North America. The 14,084.6-foot (4,293 m) fourteener is located 5.0 miles (8.1 km) east by south (bearing 102°) of the Town of Crestone in Saguache County, Colorado, United States. The summit is on the northwest shoulder of Kit Carson Mountain, and is a subpeak of the latter. It was renamed in memory of the seven astronauts who died when the Space Shuttle Challenger disintegrated shortly after liftoff on January 28, 1986.

== The Memorial ==
The proposal to name the summit Challenger Point was made by Colorado Springs resident Dennis Williams in 1986. The USGS Board of Geographic Names approved the application on April 9, 1987.

Local climber Alan Silverstein organized and led an expedition on the weekend of July 18, 1987 to place a 6 by 12 inches (15 by 30 cm) memorial plaque on the summit.
The plaque reads:

CHALLENGER POINT, 14080+'
In Memory of the Crew of Shuttle Challenger
Seven who died accepting the risk,
expanding Mankind's horizons
January 28, 1986 Ad Astra Per Aspera

The Latin phrase "Ad Astra Per Aspera" translates as "To the stars through adversity."

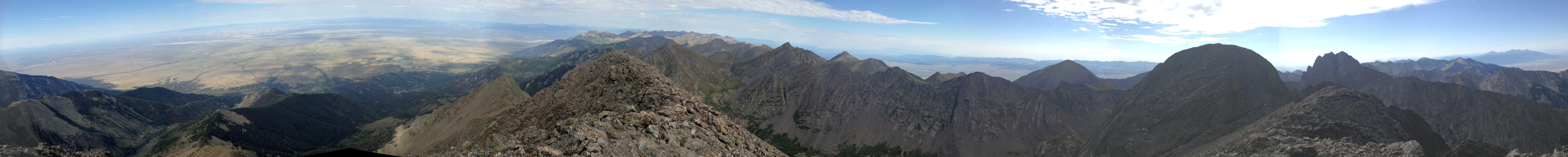
View from the summit

== Climbing ==
- Trailhead: Willow Creek Trailhead, 8,900 feet (2,713 m)

== See also ==
- Columbia Point
- List of mountain peaks of Colorado
  - List of Colorado fourteeners
